= Virginia State Route 672 =

State highway in Virginia, United States

State Route 672

Route information
- Maintained by VDOT

Location
- Country: United States
- State: Virginia

Highway system
- Virginia Routes; Interstate; US; Primary; Secondary; Byways; History; HOT lanes

State Route 672 (SR 672) in the U.S. state of Virginia is a secondary route designation applied to multiple discontinuous road segments among the many counties. The list below describes the sections in each county that are designated SR 672.

== List ==
County	Length (mi)	Length (km)	From	Via	To	Notes
Accomack	1.60	2.57	SR 639 (Phillips Drive)	Fair Oaks Road	Dead End	
Albemarle	3.70	5.95	Dead End	Via Lane Bluffton Road	Dead End	Gap between segments ending at different points along SR 810
Alleghany	0.40	0.64	Dead End	Hooks Mill Lane	SR 621 (Roaring Run Road)	
Amelia	1.10	1.77	SR 616 (Genito Road)	Obslo Lane	Dead End	
Amherst	2.45	3.94	Dead End	Historic Riverview Road Riverview Road Sandy Bottom Lane	SR 833 (Old Wright Shop Road)	Gap between FR-1230 and SR 210
Appomattox	0.80	1.29	SR 626 (Holiday Lake Road)	Watts Mill Road	Prince Edward County line	
Augusta	0.90	1.45	US 340 (East Side Highway)	Turk Mountain Road	Dead End	
Bath	0.36	0.58	Dead End	Sangers Lane	SR 614 (Muddy Run Road)	
Bedford	1.98	3.19	Dead End	Gregory Lane Knight Road	SR 752 (Fontella Road)	
Botetourt	3.35	5.39	Dead End	Greenway Hollow Road Etzler Road	SR 630 (Blacksburg Road)	Gap between segments ending at different points along SR 779
Brunswick	6.94	11.17	SR 600 (Manning Drive)	Triplett Road	SR 611 (Dry Bread Road)	Gap between segments ending at different points along SR 670
Buchanan	2.05	3.30	SR 602	Copperhead Road	SR 80	
Buckingham	3.50	5.63	SR 670 (CG Woodson Road)	Morgans Hill Road Blinkys Road Oliver Shop Road	SR 675 (Arvon Road)	Gap between segments ending at different points along SR 796
Campbell	2.11	3.40	SR 635 (Collins Ferry Road)	Maddox Road	SR 605 (Whipping Creek Road)	
Caroline	1.90	3.06	SR 601 (Golansville Road)	Boxley Road	SR 639 (Ladysmith Road)	
Carroll	2.10	3.38	Dead End	New Hope Road Huff Hill Road	SR 638 (Huff Hill Road)	
Charlotte	13.50	21.73	SR 678 (Aspen Road/Francisco Road)	Mount Carmel Road Midway Road Mount Zion Road	SR 615 (Rolling Hill Road)	Gap between segments ending at different points along SR 40
Chesterfield	2.83	4.55	SR 678 (Providence Road)	Adkins Road Arch Road	US 60 (Midlothian Turnpike)	Gap between segments ending at different points along SR 647
Clarke	3.03	4.88	SR 761 (Old Charles Town Road)	Swimley Road	Frederick County line	
Craig	0.17	0.27	Dead End	Meadow Avenue Unnamed road	SR 644 (Cumberland Avenue)	
Culpeper	4.50	7.24	SR 669 (Carrico Mills Road)	Stones Mill Road	SR 620 (Edwards Shop Road)	
Cumberland	5.33	8.58	SR 622 (Trents Mill Road/Bear Creek Lake Road)	Sports Lake Road	SR 613 (Sports Lake Road/Petersville Road)	
Dickenson	2.03	3.27	SR 607 (Main Street)	Fox Town Road Unnamed road	Dead End	
Dinwiddie	2.53	4.07	SR 613 (Squirrel Level Road)	Church Road Weakley Road	SR 142 (Simpson Road)	
Essex	0.60	0.97	SR 600 (Butylo Road)	Cloverdale Road	Dead End	
Fairfax	4.77	7.68	SR 664 (Waples Mill Road)	Vale Road	Vienna town limits	Gap between segments ending at different points along SR 671 Gap between segments ending at different points along SR 674
Fauquier	5.18	8.34	Dead End	Duhollow Road Blackwell Road	SR 628 (Blantyre Road)	Gaps between dead ends Gap between segments ending at different points along SR 605
Floyd	4.70	7.56	SR 679 (Bethlehem Church Road)	Laurel Creek Road	SR 610 (Huffviller Road)	
Fluvanna	4.00	6.44	SR 671 (Gold Mine Road)	Carys Creek Road	US 15 (James Madison Highway)	
Franklin	2.55	4.10	SR 900 (Three Oaks Road)	Fox Fire Road Inglewood Road	Dead End	Gap between segments ending at different points along SR 670
Frederick	8.11	13.05	SR 677 (Saint Clair Road)	Catalpa Road Hiatt Road Hopewell Road Brucetown Road	Clarke County line	Gap between segments ending at different points along SR 661 Gap between segments ending at different points along US 11
Giles	1.00	1.61	SR 724 (Old Wolf Creek Road)	Turner Road	Dead End	
Gloucester	0.40	0.64	Dead End	Fleming Road	SR 642 (Little England Drive)	
Goochland	2.10	3.38	SR 633 (Poor House Road)	Turner Road	SR 634 (Maidens Road)	
Grayson	11.65	18.75	SR 658 (Flatridge Road)	Blue Spring Road Honey Grove Road Wilburns Mill Road Roberts Cove Road Blue Spring Road	SR 658 (Comers Rock Road)	
Greene	0.95	1.53	SR 609 (Fredericksburg Road)	Miller Mountain Road	Dead End	
Greensville	0.06	0.10	SR 664	Stuart Street	SR 673 (Turner Lane)	
Halifax	4.10	6.60	SR 57 (Chatham Road)	Johnson Mill Road Plato Road Jones Trail	Dead End	Gap between segments ending at different points along SR 676
Hanover	0.30	0.48	US 33 (Mountain Road)	Hatch Thompson Road	Dead End	
Henry	4.55	7.32	SR 57 (Fairystone Park Highway)	Bassett Heights Road Bassett Heights Road Extension Forest View Drive	SR 606 (Original Henry Road)	Gap between segments ending at different points along SR 674
Isle of Wight	0.56	0.90	SR 673 (Morgarts Beach Road)	Days Point Lane	SR 673 (Morgarts Beach Road)	
James City	0.66	1.06	SR 615 (Ironbound Road)	Carriage Road	Cul-de-Sac	
King and Queen	0.84	1.35	SR 631 (Fleets Mill Road)	Holmestown Road	Dead End	
King George	0.08	0.13	SR 673 (Duclos Lane)	Austin Drive	SR 671 (Gordon Drive)	
King William	0.35	0.56	Dead End	Unnamed road	SR 633 (Powhatan Trail)	
Lancaster	0.24	0.39	SR 634 (King Carter Drive)	Virginia Road	Dead End	
Lee	6.00	9.66	SR 683	Unnamed road	US 58	Gap between segments ending at different points along SR 682
Loudoun	5.75	9.25	SR 673 (Broad Way East)	Lovettsville Road	US 15 (James Monroe Highway)	
Louisa	0.45	0.72	SR 22 (Louisa Road)	Waldrop Road	Dead End	
Lunenburg	1.60	2.57	Dead End	Irby Road	SR 671 (Reedy Creek Road)	
Madison	0.67	1.08	SR 649 (Quaker Run Road)	Doubletop Road Meadows Lane	Dead End	
Mathews	0.07	0.11	Dead End	Edwards Landing Road	SR 636 (Bay Haven Road)	
Mecklenburg	5.45	8.77	SR 678 (Landfill Road)	Bowers Road Red Gate Road	SR 663 (Busy Bee Road)	Gap between segments ending at different points along SR 669
Middlesex	0.65	1.05	SR 664 (Woods Creek Road)	Felton Road	Dead End	
Montgomery	3.25	5.23	Dead End	Camp Carysbrook Road	SR 600 (Piney Woods Road)	
Nelson	5.60	9.01	SR 655 (Variety Mills Road)	Dark Hollow Road East Branch Loop	SR 151 (Patrick Henry Highway)	
New Kent	0.90	1.45	Dead End	Wahrani Road	SR 620 (Homestead Road)	
Northampton	0.70	1.13	Dead End	Johnson Cove Road	SR 611 (Concord Wharf Road)	
Northumberland	0.80	1.29	SR 1122 (Oystershell Road)	Painter Point Road	SR 669 (Bluff Point Road)	
Nottoway	0.90	1.45	SR 633 (Lone Pine Road)	Harper Road	Dead End	
Orange	2.00	3.22	SR 622 (Old Office Road)	Muster Field Road	SR 611 (Raccoon Road)	
Page	1.53	2.46	Shenandoah National Park boundary	Unnamed road	SR 689 (Ida Road)	Gap between segments ending at different points along SR 668
Patrick	5.20	8.37	SR 773 (Ararat Highway)	The Hollow Road Johnson Creek Road	Carroll County line	Gap between segments ending at different points along SR 677
Pittsylvania	9.01	14.50	US 29/FR-678	Cotton Patch Road Pittsville Road	SR 608 (Ridgeway Road)	
Powhatan	1.10	1.77	SR 605 (Moseley Road)	Bradbury Road	Dead End	
Prince Edward	0.40	0.64	SR 625 (Featherfin Road)	Ridge Road	Appomattox County line	
Prince George	0.17	0.27	Dead End	Johns Road	SR 667 (Johns Road)	
Prince William	1.38	2.22	SR 652 (Fitzwater Drive)	Manley ROad	SR 658 (Owls Nest Road)	
Pulaski	6.55	10.54	Dead End	Lilly Road Lowmans Ferry Road Baptist Hollow Road Nunn Hollow Road	Dead End	Gap between segments ending at different points along FR-47 Gap between segments ending at different points along SR 693
Rappahannock	0.36	0.58	Dead End	Daiseys Rest Road	SR 614 (Keyser Run Road)	
Richmond	0.35	0.56	Dead End	River View Road	SR 660 (Cobham Park Lane)	
Roanoke	0.07	0.11	Dead End	Rainelle Street	SR 866 (Mount Pleasant Boulevard)	
Rockbridge	8.29	13.34	SR 251/SR 770	Enfield Road	Lexington city limits	
Rockingham	6.18	9.95	SR 668 (Timber Ridge Road)	Mill Creek Church Road Latimer Road Pineville Road	SR 996 (McGaheysville Road)	Gap between segments ending at different points along SR 671
Russell	0.90	1.45	Dead End	Stumptown Road	SR 80 (Honnaker Road)	
Scott	0.68	1.09	SR 671	Ponderosa Road Unnamed road	SR 71 (Nicklesville Highway)	
Shenandoah	1.70	2.74	US 11 (Old Valley Pike)	Chapman Landing Road	Dead End	
Smyth	3.90	6.28	SR 670 (Teas Road)	Slabtown Road	SR 601 (Teas Road)	
Southampton	9.35	15.05	SR 665	Cypress Bridge Road Mount Horeb Road Unnamed road	SR 684 (Monroe Road)	Gap between segments ending at different points along SR 673
Spotsylvania	0.44	0.71	SR 608 (Massaponax Church Road)	Hall Industrial Drive	Dead End	
Stafford	0.20	0.32	Dead End	Reids Road	SR 630 (Courthouse Road)	
Sussex	0.16	0.26	SR 647 (North Street)	Pinecrest Road	SR 673 (Sylvan Road)	
Tazewell	1.35	2.17	Dead End	Haga Road	SR 659 (Exhibit Mine Road)	
Warren	0.10	0.16	Dead End	Bubb Lane	SR 613 (Bentonville Browntown Road)	
Washington	2.51	4.04	SR 664 (Aven Lane)	Parks Mill Road	SR 75 (Green Spring Road)	
Westmoreland	0.87	1.40	SR 645 (Zacata Road)	Chatham Lane	Dead End	
Wise	1.00	1.61	Dead End	Unnamed road	SR 671 (North Fork Road)	
Wythe	2.50	4.02	SR 749 (Cedar Springs Road)	Ward Branch Road	SR 670 (Zion Church Road)	
York	0.35	0.56	Dead End	Crockett Road	SR 787 (Old Seaford Road)	
