= Virginia State Route 639 =

State highway in Virginia, United States

State Route 639

Route information
- Maintained by VDOT

Location
- Country: United States
- State: Virginia

Highway system
- Virginia Routes; Interstate; US; Primary; Secondary; Byways; History; HOT lanes

State Route 639 (SR 639) in the U.S. state of Virginia is a secondary route designation applied to multiple discontinuous road segments among the many counties. The list below describes the sections in each county that are designated SR 639.

== List ==
County	Length (mi)	Length (km)	From	Via	To	Notes
Accomack	4.05	6.52	SR 718 (Savageville Road)	Dogwood Drive Phillips Drive	SR 626 (Main Street/Airport Drive)	
Albemarle	1.25	2.01	Dead End	Harrington Road	Dead End	
Alleghany	0.76	1.22	SR 632 (Golf Course View)	Longdale Station Road	Dead End	
Amelia	4.90	7.89	US 360 (Patrick Henry Highway)	Mount Zion Road	SR 681 (Clementown Road/Pridesville Road)	
Amherst	0.20	0.32	SR 716 (Falconerville Road)	French Lane	Dead End	
Appomattox	2.90	4.67	SR 627 (River Ridge Road)	Poorhouse Creek Road	SR 632 (Morning Star Road)	
Augusta	2.40	3.86	SR 608 (Draft Avenue)	Wayne Avenue	SR 634 (Patton Farm Road)	
Bath	0.60	0.97	SR 635	Kiser Lane	Dead End	
Bedford	5.65	9.09	SR 643 (Otterville Road)	Hurricane Drive Coltons Mill Road	SR 640 (Gumstock Creek Road/Wheats Valley Road)	Gap between segments ending at different points along SR 122
Bland	0.20	0.32	SR 608 (Skydusky Road)	Grandaddys Drive	Dead End	
Botetourt	3.80	6.12	SR 630 (Springwood Road)	Wheatland Road	US 11 (Lee Highway)	
Brunswick	5.73	9.22	Mecklenburg County Line	Forksville Road Rustic Road Old Indian Road	SR 644 (Grandy Road)	Gap between dead ends
Buchanan	6.20	9.98	SR 83	Compton Mountain Road	SR 616	
Buckingham	3.00	4.83	SR 633 (Oak Hill Road)	Jerico Road	SR 633 (Oak Hill Road)	
Campbell	1.00	1.61	Dead End	Gilliam Road	SR 600 (Sugar Hill Road)	
Caroline	11.44	18.41	SR 738 (Partlow Road/Teman Road)	Anderson Mill Road Ladysmith Road	SR 207 (Rogers Clark Boulevard)	Formerly SR 229
Carroll	3.60	5.79	SR 647 (Canas Circle)	Ben Ridge Road Little Bit Road Spencers Mill Road	SR 608 (Pilot View Road)	Gap between segments ending at different points along SR 643 Gap between segments ending at different points along SR 633
Charles City	1.00	1.61	Dead End	The New Road	SR 607 (Wayside Road)	
Charlotte	1.90	3.06	SR 623 (West Point Stephens Road)	Towler Road	SR 622 (Old Kings Road)	
Chesterfield	1.08	1.74	SR 638 (Cogbill Road)	Howell Drive	SR 637 (Hopkins Road)	
Clarke	4.14	6.66	SR 632 (Crums Church Road)	Allen Road	West Virginia State Line	
Craig	0.32	0.51	Dead End	Southside Road	SR 636 (Waiteville Road)	
Culpeper	2.78	4.47	SR 626 (Black Hill Road)	Holly Spring Road	Rappahannock County Line	
Cumberland	4.64	7.47	SR 638 (Guinea Road)	Putney Road	SR 631 (Davenport Road)	
Dickenson	1.80	2.90	Dead End	Unnamed road	SR 637 (DC Caney Ridge Road)	
Dinwiddie	6.08	9.78	Nottoway County Line	Wilson Road Springston Road Grubby Road Wilson Road	SR 613 (White Oak Road)	Gap between segments ending at different points along US 460
Essex	6.39	10.28	SR 625 (Supply Road)	Walnut Shade Road Ullainee Road Pedro Pitts Road Laurel Springs Road	SR 635 (Rose Mount Road)	Gap between segments ending at different points along SR 637
Fairfax	0.72	1.16	SR 5231 (Chancellor Way)	Rolling Road Peacock Station Road	SR 738 (Old Dominion Drive)	Gap between a dead end and SR 676
Fauquier	3.80	6.12	SR 616 (Bristersburg Road)	Cromwell Road	SR 612 (Brent Town Road)	
Floyd	5.08	8.18	SR 666 (Cypress Drive)/Franklin County Line	Radford Road Kellys Drive River Ridge Road Boothe Creek Road White Locke Road	SR 668 (Cannaday School Road)	Gap between segments ending at different points along SR 888 Gap between segments ending at different points along SR 640 Gap between segments ending at different points along SR 661
Fluvanna	4.70	7.56	SR 620 (Rolling Road)	Long Acre Road	SR 640 (Haden Martin Road)	
Franklin	0.99	1.59	SR 684 (Boones Mill Road)	Ridge Mountain Road	Dead End	
Frederick	1.80	2.90	SR 640 (Refuge Church Road)	East Refuge Church Road	Warren County Line	
Giles	1.20	1.93	SR 601 (Laurel Springs Road)	Orchard Hill Lane	Dead End	
Gloucester	0.60	0.97	SR 618 (Cappahosic Road)	Cowpen Neck Road	Dead End	
Goochland	5.08	8.18	SR 634 (Maidens Road)	Sheppard Town Road	SR 670 (Cardwell Road)	
Grayson	1.30	2.09	SR 638 (Lime Kiln Lane)	Delps Beach Lane	Dead End	
Greene	1.00	1.61	SR 634 (Bull Yearling Road)	Saddleback Road	Shenandoah National Park boundary	
Greensville	4.50	7.24	SR 627 (Brink Road)	Unnamed road Rock Bridge Road	SR 691 (Cedar Lane)	
Halifax	4.10	6.60	Pittsylvania County Line	Rock Barn Road	SR 638 (Bull Creek Road)	
Hanover	0.34	0.55	SR 638 (Atlee Road)	Mann Drive	SR 640 (Shady Grove Road)	
Henry	2.28	3.67	US 220 Bus	Prospho Springs Road	SR 640 (Old Mill Road)	
Highland	0.50	0.80	SR 640 (Blue Grass Valley Road)	Unnamed road	SR 637	
Isle of Wight	2.00	3.22	SR 641 (Barrett Town Road)	Ecella Road Winston Drive	SR 638 (Cut Thru Road)	
James City	0.69	1.11	US 60 (Richmond Road)	Merry Oaks Lane Llewellyn Drive	Cul-de-Sac	
King and Queen	1.60	2.57	SR 628 (Spring Cottage Road)	Eastern View Road	SR 721 (Newtown Road)	
King George	0.90	1.45	SR 624 (Mathias Point Road)	Osprey Road	Dead End	
King William	1.10	1.77	Dead End	Mount Columbia Road	SR 604 (Dabneys Mill Road)	
Lancaster	1.30	2.09	Dead End	Beach Road	SR 695 (Chesapeake Drive)	
Lee	0.50	0.80	SR 640 (Shavers Ford Road)	Unnamed road	SR 723	
Loudoun	0.60	0.97	US 50 (John S Mosby Highway)	Willard Road	Washington Dulles International Airport	
Louisa	5.50	8.85	US 33 (Spotswood Trail)	Doctors Road Mallorys Ford Road	Orange County Line	
Lunenburg	1.70	2.74	SR 635 (Oral Oaks Road)	Red Level Lane Dixie Lane	SR 637 (Craig Mill Road)	Gap between dead ends
Madison	1.80	2.90	SR 638 (Hebron Church Road)	Tennants Church Road	SR 640 (Mill Hill Road)	
Mathews	2.18	3.51	Dead End	Hills Bay Drive Crab Neck Road	Dead End	Gap between segments ending at different points along SR 223
Mecklenburg	3.10	4.99	SR 621 (Country Club Road)	Forksville Road	Brunswick County Line	
Middlesex	0.69	1.11	SR 33 (General Puller Highway)	Crafton Quarter Road	Dead End	
Montgomery	4.80	7.72	SR 772 (Harmony Road)	Mount Pleasant Road	SR 637 (Alleghany Springs Road)	
Nelson	10.61	17.08	SR 747 (Marietta Lane)	Nelson Avenue Craigtown Road Laurel Road	SR 6 (Irish Road)	Gap between segments ending at SR 56
New Kent	0.80	1.29	SR 30 (New Kent Highway)	Mount Nebo Road	SR 634 (Polishtown Road)	
Northampton	2.84	4.57	US 13 Bus	Sunnyside Road	Dead End	
Northumberland	1.50	2.41	Dead End	Cedar Point Road	US 360 (Northumberland Highway)	
Nottoway	1.00	1.61	Dinwiddie County Line	Hobbs Mill Road	SR 640 (Wilson Road)	
Orange	9.41	15.14	Louisa County Line	Mallorys Ford Road Madison Run Road Chicken Mountain Road Jacksontown Road	SR 20 (Constitution Highway)	
Page	0.90	1.45	US 340 Bus	Lakewood Road	SR 616 (Leaksville Road)	Gap between segments ending at different points along SR 638
Patrick	5.88	9.46	SR 632 (Dan River Road)	Cherry Creek Road	US 58 (Jeb Stuart Highway)	
Pittsylvania	0.80	1.29	SR 761 (Straightstone Road)	Honeybee Road	Halifax County Line	
Powhatan	1.90	3.06	SR 603 (Petersburg Road)	Pilkington Road	SR 622 (Clayville Road)	
Prince Edward	4.10	6.60	SR 660 (Heights School Road)	Mill Bank Road Elam Road	SR 657 (Sulphur Spring Road)	Gap between segments ending at different points along SR 658
Prince George	3.66	5.89	SR 10 (James River Drive)	Flowerdew Hundred Road	Dead End	
Prince William	1.63	2.62	Cul-de-Sac	Horner Road	SR 123 (Gordon Boulevard)	
Pulaski	2.93	4.72	Dead End	Schrader Hill Road Loving Field Road Thornspring Church Road	SR 643 (Thorn Springs Road)	Gap between segments ending at different points along SR 738 Gap between segments ending at different points along SR 636
Rappahannock	0.90	1.45	Culpeper County Line	Holly Springs Road Weaver Road	Dead End	
Richmond	0.45	0.72	SR 638 (Oak Row Road)	Mozingo Road	Dead End	
Roanoke	8.21	13.21	US 11 (Main Street)	West River Road Harborwood Road West Riverside Drive	Salem City Limits	Gap between segments ending at different points along SR 612
Rockbridge	3.50	5.63	Dead End	Higgins Hollow Tucker Kerr Lane Ebenezer Circle	US 60 (Midland Trail)	Gap between segments ending at different points along SR 638
Rockingham	1.78	2.86	SR 640 (Model Road)	Nicholson Road Manger Hill Road	US 33 Bus	
Russell	1.05	1.69	SR 80 (Rebbud Highway)	Unnamed road	SR 624 (Drill Road)	
Scott	2.43	3.91	SR 713 (Stanley Valley Road)	Colonial Post Office Road Unnamed road	SR 867 (Prospect Church Road)	
Shenandoah	1.00	1.61	SR 757 (Copp Road)	Green Acre Drive	US 11 (Old Valley Pike)	
Smyth	0.88	1.42	US 11 (Lee Highway)	Sulphur Springs Road	SR 107 (White Top Avenue)	
Southampton	0.20	0.32	Surry County Line	Warrens Quarter Road	Dead End	
Spotsylvania	8.64	13.90	SR 608 (Massaponax Church Road)	Leavells Road Salem Church Road Bragg Road	SR 618 (River Road)	Gap between segments ending at different points along SR 620 Gap between segments ending at different points along SR 3
Stafford	0.18	0.29	US 1 (Jefferson Davis Highway)	Woodstock Lane	SR 637 (Telegraph Road)	
Surry	0.60	0.97	Sussex County Line	Freemans Pond Road	Southampton County Line	
Sussex	0.10	0.16	US 460 (General Mahone Boulevard)	Unnamed road	Surry County Line	
Tazewell	3.03	4.88	US 19/US 460	Earls Branch Road Cliff Road	SR 636 (McGuire Valley Road)	Gap between segments ending at different points along SR 631
Warren	4.47	7.19	Frederick County Line	Refuge Church Road Ashby Station Road Rockland Road Ashby Station Road	SR 624 (Milldale Road)	
Washington	0.99	1.59	Bristol City Limits	Clayman Valley Road	Dead End	
Westmoreland	2.59	4.17	SR 625 (Twiford Road)	Winter Harbor Road	SR 3 (Kings Highway)	
Wise	0.60	0.97	SR 640	Unnamed road Crabtree Road	Dead End	
Wythe	1.73	2.78	SR 742 (Painters Hill Road)	Riverview Road	Dead End	
York	0.45	0.72	Dead End	Maple Road	SR 660 (Baptist Road)	
