= Virginia State Route 665 =

State highway in Virginia, United States

State Route 665

Route information
- Maintained by VDOT

Location
- Country: United States
- State: Virginia

Highway system
- Virginia Routes; Interstate; US; Primary; Secondary; Byways; History; HOT lanes

State Route 665 (SR 665) in the U.S. state of Virginia is a secondary route designation applied to multiple discontinuous road segments among the many counties. The list below describes the sections in each county that are designated SR 665.

== List ==
County	Length (mi)	Length (km)	From	Via	To	Notes
Accomack	1.60	2.57	Dead End	Shultz Landing Road Orchard Road	US 13 (Lankford Highway)	Gap between segments ending at different points along SR 661
Albemarle	8.38	13.49	SR 671 (Ballards Mill Road)	Millington Road Buck Mountain Road	SR 664 (Markwood Road)	Gap between segments ending at different points along SR 601
Alleghany	0.50	0.80	Dead End	Moss Run Road	SR 159 (Dunlap Creek Road)	
Amelia	0.57	0.92	Dead End	Jackson Lane	US 360 (Patrick Henry Highway)	
Amherst	3.69	5.94	SR 778 (Lowesville Road)	Flat Woods Road Warrick Barn Road	SR 151 (Patrick Henry Highway)	
Appomattox	2.80	4.51	SR 611 (Abbit Branch Road/Bellview Road)	Meadow Drive	SR 608 (Stonewall Road)	
Augusta	0.40	0.64	Dead End	Palmer Mill Road	SR 695 (Sugar Loaf Road)	
Bath	0.30	0.48	SR 633	Cabin Draft Road	Dead End	
Bedford	6.30	10.14	SR 668 (Crockett Road)	White Road Elk Valley Road	Dead End	
Bland	0.55	0.89	Dead End	Quarry Drive	US 52 (Clear Fork Creek Highway)	
Botetourt	5.90	9.50	SR 600 (Breckinridge Mill Road)	Haymakertown Road Country Club Road	US 220 (Roanoke Road)	Gap between segments ending at different points along SR 666
Brunswick	3.36	5.41	SR 626 (Gasburg Road)	Ankum Road	SR 46 (Christanna Highway)	
Buchanan	1.50	2.41	SR 624 (Garden Creek Road)	Rosin Camp Road	Dead End	
Buckingham	3.85	6.20	SR 633 (Oak Hill Road)	Twin Creek Road Fanny White Road	SR 631 (Troublesome Creek Road)	
Campbell	0.64	1.03	US 501 (Campbell Highway)	East Brook Road	SR 660 (East Brook Road)	
Caroline	4.20	6.76	SR 618 (Alps Road)	Dodge City Road	SR 625 (Passing Road)	
Carroll	1.40	2.25	Dead End	Walkers Knob Road	SR 722 (Cranberry Road)	
Charles City	0.18	0.29	SR 5 (John Tyler Memorial Highway)	Harrison Lake Road	Dead End	
Charlotte	3.47	5.58	SR 727 (Red House Road)	Harvey Road	SR 47 (Thomas Jefferson Highway)	
Chesterfield	4.40	7.08	Dead End	Pear Orchard Road	SR 603 (Skinquarter Road)	
Clarke	0.20	0.32	US 50 (Millwood Pike)	Trenary Lane	Dead End	
Craig	0.38	0.61	SR 677 (Scott Avenue)	Kanawha Street	SR 650 (Marshall Avenue)	
Culpeper	2.01	3.23	Dead End	Inlet Road	SR 685 (Auburn Road)	
Cumberland	0.13	0.21	SR 45 (Cartersville Road)	Tavern Road High Street	Dead End	
Dickenson	1.50	2.41	Wise County line	Unnamed road	SR 72 (Cranes Nest Road/Coeburn Road)	
Dinwiddie	8.35	13.44	Sussex County line	Walkers Mill Road Black Mill Road Mortar Branch Road	Dead End	
Essex	0.62	1.00	SR 627 (Mountain Landing Road)	Rexburg Loop	SR 627 (Mountain Landing Road	
Fairfax	9.15	14.73	SR 5320 (Sunrise Valley Drive)	Coppermine Road Fox Mill Road Frying Pan Road Fox Mill Road Waples Mill Road	US 29 (Lee Highway)	Gap between SR 657 and SR 5320 Gap between segments ending at different points along SR 602
Fauquier	0.30	0.48	SR 667 (Old Dumfries Road)	Catlett School Road	SR 28 (Catlett Road)	
Floyd	4.27	6.87	SR 612 (Stone Wall Road)	Eanes Road Kings Store Road Good Neighbors Road	SR 642 (Locust Grove Road)	Gap between segments ending at different points along SR 661 Gap between segments ending at different points along SR 654
Fluvanna	0.10	0.16	SR 653 (Three Chopt Road)	Grace Johnson Lane	US 250 (Three Notch Road)	
Franklin	1.84	2.96	SR 670 (Burnt Chimney Road)	Mallard Point Road	Cul-de-Sac	
Frederick	1.59	2.56	SR 672 (Hopewell Road)	Waverly Road	SR 672 (Hopewell Road)	
Giles	4.78	7.69	SR 663 (Sugar Run Road)	Wilbur Valley Road	SR 100 (Pulaski Giles Turnpike)	
Gloucester	1.53	2.46	Dead End	Ware Point Road	SR 623 (Ware Neck Road)	
Goochland	0.15	0.24	SR 632 (Fairground Road)	Hidden Rock Dr	Dead End	
Grayson	3.30	5.31	SR 611 (Stones Chapel Road/Pheasant Run Lane)	Stones Chapel Road	SR 658 (Comers Rock Road)	
Greensville	0.80	1.29	Dead End	Blanks Lane	US 301	
Halifax	2.60	4.18	SR 676 (Thompson Store Road)	Nunnleys Bridge Road	SR 675 (Ridgeway Road)	
Hanover	2.38	3.83	SR 666 (Blanton Road)	Yowell Road	Ashland town limits	
Henry	3.38	5.44	Dead End	Hidden Valley Drive	SR 108 (Figsboro Road)	
Isle of Wight	6.76	10.88	SR 711 (New Town Haven Lane)	Campbells Chapel Way Campbells Chapel Drive Reynolds Drive Smiths Neck Road Rainbow Road Riverview Bluff Way	Dead End	
James City	0.15	0.24	Dead End	Turners Neck Road	SR 631 (Little Creek Dam Road)	
King and Queen	1.04	1.67	Dead End	Hell Bottom Road	SR 721 (Newtown Road)	
King George	1.53	2.46	SR 3 (Kings Highway)	Birchwood Creek Lane	SR 605 (Bloomsbury Road)	
King William	0.24	0.39	Dead End	Belmont Lane	SR 600 (River Road)	
Lancaster	1.52	2.45	Dead End	Sulla Vans Road	Dead End	
Lee	5.20	8.37	Dead End	Unnamed road	SR 612 (Lower Waldens Creek Road)	
Loudoun	8.15	13.12	SR 662 (Factory Street)	High Street Butchers Row Loyalty Road Furnace Mountain Road	SR 672 (Lovettsville Road)	Gap between segments ending at different points along SR 663
Louisa	2.65	4.26	US 33 (Jefferson Highway)	Kennon Road	US 522 (Pendelton Road)	
Lunenburg	2.60	4.18	SR 626 (Kings Road)	Blankenship Pond Road	SR 625 (Bethel Church Road)	
Madison	3.70	5.95	Dead End	Garth Run Road	SR 662 (Graves Mill Road)	
Mathews	0.60	0.97	Dead End	Blue Water Drive Fleetwood Circle	SR 642 (Fitchetts Wharf Road)	
Mecklenburg	1.10	1.77	SR 664 (Union Level Road)	Rail Road	Dead End	
Middlesex	0.40	0.64	Dead End	Seven Springs Lane	US 17/SR 616	
Montgomery	1.80	2.90	Dead End	Bains Chapel Road	Dead End	Gap between segments ending at different points along FR-58 (Bains Chapel Road)
Nelson	6.41	10.32	SR 674 (Rose Mill Road)	Old Rose Mill Road Wilson Hill Road	SR 665 (Wilson Hill Road)	Gap between segments ending at different points along US 29
New Kent	2.90	4.67	SR 640 (Old Roxbury Road)	Hen Peck Road	SR 611 (South Quaker Road)	
Northampton	1.80	2.90	Dead End	Old Castle Road Elkington Road	Dead End	
Northumberland	3.36	5.41	Dead End	Millpoint Drive Mila Road Millpoint Drive	Dead End	Gap between segments ending at different points along SR 609
Nottoway	0.81	1.30	Dead End	Cole Harbor Road	Blackstone town limits/Nottoway Avenue	
Orange	0.50	0.80	SR 738 (Tibbstown Road)	Hardwick Mountain Road	Dead End	
Page	0.20	0.32	US 340	Overall Road	Dead End	
Patrick	1.74	2.80	SR 650 (Big Dan Lake Drive)	Mills School Road	SR 649 (Gammons Road)	
Pittsylvania	15.83	25.48	Dead End	Rockford School Road Fairmont Road	SR 40/SR 792	Gap between segments ending at different points along SR 924 Gap between segments ending at different points along SR 634 Gap between segments ending at different points along SR 40
Powhatan	0.15	0.24	SR 617 (Old River Trail)	Country Road	Dead End	
Prince Edward	14.81	23.83	SR 671 (County Line Road)	Darlington Heights Road Abilene Road Worsham Road	SR 630 (Redd Shop Road)	
Prince George	0.87	1.40	SR 635 (Heritage Road/Centennial Road)	Brockwell Road	Dead End	
Prince William	0.45	0.72	SR 294 (Prince William Parkway)	Ellis Road	SR 689 (Signal Hill Road)	
Pulaski	5.60	9.01	Dead End	Simpkinstown Road	SR 693 (Lead Mine Road)	
Rappahannock	0.03	0.05	SR 610 (Chester Gap Road)	Chester Gap Road	Warren County line	
Richmond	0.10	0.16	SR 642 (Sharps Road)	Milden Lane	Dead End	
Roanoke	0.30	0.48	SR 666 (Bandy Road)	Edenshire Road	Dead End	
Rockbridge	1.50	2.41	SR 669	Cold Run Drive	Dead End	
Rockingham	0.55	0.89	Dead End	Dovel Road	SR 602 (East Point Road)	
Russell	4.33	6.97	Dead End	Powe Plant Road	SR 616 (Carbo Road)	
Scott	12.90	20.76	Dead end	Moccasin Avenue Manville Road Unnamed road	Dead end	Gap between segments ending at different points along SR 645 Gap between segments ending at different points along SR 662
Shenandoah	1.28	2.06	Woodstock town limits	Mill Road	SR 758 (Cemetery Road)	
Smyth	2.40	3.86	SR 659 (Old Ebenezer Road)	Chilhowie Street Greenwood Road Unnamed road	SR 617 (Walkers Creek Road)	Gap between segments ending at different points along SR 658 Gap between segments ending at different points along SR 645
Southampton	11.25	18.11	SR 663 (The Hall Road)	Vicks Mill Road Unnamed road	SR 673 (Statesville Road)	Gap between segments ending at different points along SR 659 Gap between segments ending at different points along SR 668
Spotsylvania	2.00	3.22	SR 601 (Lewiston Road)	Belfonte Road	Dead End	
Stafford	0.69	1.11	SR 1655 (Brown Circle)	Clarion Drive	SR 606 (Ferry Road)	
Surry	0.77	1.24	SR 634 (Alliance Road)	Chippokes Park Road	Dead End	
Sussex	0.80	1.29	SR 619 (Walkers Mill Road)	Walkers Mill Road	Dinwiddie County line	
Tazewell	0.95	1.53	Dead End	Camp Joy Road Bluestone Loop	Dead End	Gap between segments ending at different points along US 19
Warren	0.07	0.11	Rappahannock County line	Unnamed road	US 522	
Washington	4.32	6.95	SR 666 (Cleveland Road)	Cleveland Road	SR 670 (Green Springs Church Road)	
Westmoreland	1.65	2.66	Dead End	Beales Wharf Road Plunktown Road	SR 626 (Erica Road)	Gap between segments ending at different points along SR 621
Wise	0.04	0.06	Dead End	Layne Hollow Road	Dickenson County line	
Wythe	1.62	2.61	SR 625 (Gap of Ridge Road)	Swallow Hollow Road	SR 666	
York	0.12	0.19	SR 662 (Arden Drive)	Kelsey Road	Dead End	
