= Virginia State Route 666 =

State highway in Virginia, United States

State Route 666

Route information
- Maintained by VDOT

Location
- Country: United States
- State: Virginia

Highway system
- Virginia Routes; Interstate; US; Primary; Secondary; Byways; History; HOT lanes

State Route 666 (SR 666) in the U.S. state of Virginia is a secondary route designation applied to multiple discontinuous road segments among the many counties. The list below describes the sections in each county that are designated SR 666.

== List ==
County	Length (mi)	Length (km)	From	Via	To	Notes
Accomack	2.95	4.75	Dead End	Fox Grove Road	SR 679 (Metompkin Road)	
Albemarle	0.80	1.29	Dead End	Allen Road	SR 664 (Markwood Road)	
Alleghany	4.20	6.76	SR 641 (Indian Draft Road)	East Morris Hill Road	SR 600	
Amelia	0.90	1.45	Dead End	Cedar Lane	SR 614 (Dennisville Road)	
Amherst	2.66	4.28	SR 778 (Lowesville Road)	Woodson Road	Nelson County line	
Appomattox	1.40	2.25	SR 608 (Stonewall Road)	Mill Pond Road	SR 611 (Bellview Road)	
Augusta	1.80	2.90	US 11 (Lee Jackson Highway)	Lofton Road	SR 608 (Cold Springs Road)	
Bath	0.52	0.84	Dead End	Church Street	SR 633	
Bedford	3.50	5.63	SR 646 (Gladden Circle)	Elkton Farm Road	US 221 (Forest Road)	
Bland	0.33	0.53	US 52 (North Scenic Highway)	Indian Village Trail	FR 3 (Arrowhead Drive)	
Botetourt	10.59	17.04	SR 779 (Catawba Road)	Haymakertown Road Lee Lane Lees Gap Road White Church Road	SR 655 (Old Fincastle Road)	Gap between segments ending at different points along SR 665 Gap between segments ending at different points along SR 600 Gap between segments ending at different points along SR 606
Brunswick	1.20	1.93	North Carolina state line	Stanley Road	SR 667 (Oak Grove Road)	
Buchanan	2.10	3.38	SR 638 (Dismal River Road)	Mill Branch Road	Dead End	
Buckingham	1.70	2.74	SR 617 (Gravel Hill Road)	Physic Spring Road	SR 622 (Trents Mill Road)	
Campbell	0.35	0.56	SR 660 (East Brook Road)	Steeple Run Road	Dead End	
Caroline	0.90	1.45	Dead End	Rixey Road	SR 631 (Farmer Drive)	
Carroll	4.70	7.56	Dead End	Bent Nail Road Collier School Road	US 221 (Floyd Pike)	Gap between segments ending at different points along US 58
Charles City	0.54	0.87	Dead End	Harrison Lake Road	SR 603 (Old Union Road)	
Charlotte	4.11	6.61	SR 727 (Red House Road)	Vincent Store Road	SR 47 (Thomas Jefferson Highway)	
Chesterfield	1.40	2.25	US 360 (Hull Street Road)	Sappony Road	Dead End	
Clarke	0.22	0.35	SR 617 (Old Chapel Avenue)	Virginia Avenue	Boyce town limits	
Craig	0.25	0.40	Dead End	Huffman Store Drive	SR 42 (Cumberland Gap Road)	
Culpeper	6.83	10.99	SR 665 (Inlet Road)	Bradford Road Braggs Corner Road Greens Corner Road	SR 663 (Stevensburg Road)	
Cumberland	0.77	1.24	Dead End	Bear Creek Lake Road	SR 629 (Oak Hill Road)	
Dickenson	0.24	0.39	SR 83 (Dickenson Highway)	Number 10 Street	Dead End	
Dinwiddie	5.40	8.69	SR 626 (Flatfoot Road)	Baugh Road	SR 618 (Halligan Park Road)	
Essex	0.50	0.80	Dead End	Shellfield Road	SR 646 (Fort Lowry Lane)	
Fairfax	1.88	3.03	SR 608 (West Ox Road)	Monroe Street	Herndon town limits	
Fauquier	0.20	0.32	SR 843 (Old Nokesville Road)	Prince William Road	Dead End	
Floyd	1.80	2.90	SR 639 (Radford Road)	Cypress Drive	SR 640 (Franklin Pike Road)	
Fluvanna	0.15	0.24	SR 657 (Bremo Bluff Road)	Magnolia Lane	Dead End	
Franklin	2.49	4.01	SR 122 (Booker T Washington Highway)	Merriman Way Road	Dead End	
Frederick	2.00	3.22	SR 761 (Old Charles Town Road)	Gun Club Road	SR 761 (Old Charles Town Road)	
Giles	1.50	2.41	Dead End	Wildwood Lane Sadler Mountain Road	Dead End	Gap between segments ending at different points along SR 42
Gloucester	0.85	1.37	Dead End	County Line Road	SR 33/SR 609	
Goochland	0.60	0.97	SR 631 (Scott Road)	Gathright Drive	US 522 (River Road)	
Grayson	0.40	0.64	Dead End	Willow Shade Lane	US 21	
Greensville	0.90	1.45	SR 730 (Low Ground Road)	Goose Pond Road	Dead End	
Halifax	2.50	4.02	SR 667 (Leda Road)	East Elkhorn Road	Pittsylvania County line	
Hanover	4.44	7.15	SR 623 (Cedar Lane)	Ashland Road Blanton Road	SR 669 (Independence Road)	
Henry	1.16	1.87	SR 674 (Philpott Drive)	Trenthill Drive	SR 57 (Fairystone Park Highway)	
Isle of Wight	0.51	0.82	SR 10	Berry Hill Road	Smithfield town limits	
James City	0.61	0.98	Cul-de-Sac	Cooley Road	SR 5 (John Tyler Memorial Highway)	
King and Queen	1.36	2.19	Dead End	Tuckers Road	SR 605 (Plain View Lane)	
King George	0.43	0.69	SR 629 (Round Hill Road)	Gulvey Loop	SR 629 (Round Hill Road)	
Lancaster	0.81	1.30	SR 222 (Weems Road)	Benson Road	SR 222 (Weems Road)	
Lee	0.60	0.97	SR 665	Unnamed road	SR 662 (Tobacco Road)	
Loudoun	1.20	1.93	SR 665 (Loyalty Road)	Browns Lane	Dead End	
Louisa	0.49	0.79	US 33 (West Main Street)	West Street	SR 669 (Ellisville Drive)	
Lunenburg	1.51	2.43	SR 662 (Nutbush Road)	Mays Road	SR 626 (Double Bridges Road)	
Madison	1.10	1.77	Dead End	Pea Ridge Road	SR 230 (Wolftown-Hood Road)	
Mathews	0.52	0.84	Dead End	Johnson Point Road	SR 626 (Hallieford Road)	
Mecklenburg	2.75	4.43	SR 668 (Dry Creek Road)	Twin Cedar Road	SR 664 (Union Level Road)	
Middlesex	1.23	1.98	Dead End	Croxtons Road	SR 606 (Glebe Landing Road/Dragon Road)	
Montgomery	4.96	7.98	SR 600 (Fire Tower Road)	Mud Pike Road	Christiansburg town limits	
Nelson	7.62	12.26	Amherst County line	Woodson Road Level Green Road Jacks Hill Road Jonesboro Road Dickie Road Riverside Loop Jonesboro Road	SR 515 (Patrick Henry Highway)	
New Kent	0.30	0.48	Dead End	Bailey Lane	SR 155 (North Courthouse Road)	
Northampton	1.75	2.82	SR 634 (Savage Neck Drive)	Smith Beach Road	Cul-de-Sac	
Northumberland	2.06	3.32	SR 665 (Mila Road)	Sandy Point Road	Dead End	
Nottoway	0.90	1.45	SR 604 (Stingy Lane Road)	Doswell Road	SR 601 (Flat Rock Road/Robertsons Road)	
Orange	1.60	2.57	SR 617 (Everona Road)	Hawfield Road	SR 627 (Clarks Mountain Road)	
Page	1.36	2.19	SR 612	Batman Hill Road	SR 612	
Patrick	2.38	3.83	SR 645 (Hatchers Chapel Road)	Dan Valley Farm Road	SR 103 (Claudville Highway)	
Pittsylvania	3.80	6.12	SR 640 (Riceville Road/Java Road)	Yeatts Store Road	Halifax County line	
Powhatan	0.50	0.80	Dead End	Clark Road	SR 632 (Evans Road)	
Prince Edward	8.50	13.68	SR 671 (County Line Road)	Chappel Road Douglas Church Road	SR 665 (Darlington Heights Road)	Gap between segments ending at different points along SR 604
Prince George	2.20	3.54	SR 616 (Laurel Springs Road/Pole Run Road)	Old Town Road	SR 635 (Centennial Road)	
Prince William	0.97	1.56	Cul-de-Sac	Pineview Road	SR 662 (Moore Drive)	
Pulaski	0.10	0.16	SR 619 (Izaak Walton League Road)	Unnamed road	Dead End	
Rappahannock	0.30	0.48	Dead End	Headwaters Road	SR 610 (Chester Gap Road)	
Richmond	0.06	0.10	Dead End	Unnamed road	SR 3 (History Land Highway)	
Roanoke	5.36	8.63	SR 657 (Crowell Gap Road)	Bandy Road	Roanoke city limits	
Rockbridge	0.40	0.64	SR 670/SR 4262	Bell Road	US 60	
Rockingham	0.50	0.80	Dead End	Mongold Hollow Road	SR 822 (Arbuckle Road)	
Russell	1.80	2.90	SR 628 (Heralds Valley Road)	Calvary Baptist Road	SR 615 (Gravel Lick Road)	
Scott	3.80	6.12	Dead End	Unnamed road Red Hill Road	SR 71 (Jackson Street)	
Shenandoah	0.40	0.64	SR 758 (Cemetery Road)	Gunn Lane	Dead End	
Smyth	1.00	1.61	SR 658 (Spring Valley Road)	Unnamed road	SR 665 (Greenwood Road)	
Southampton	4.29	6.90	SR 730 (Whitehead Road)	Unnamed road Old Branchville Road	SR 35 (Meherrin Road)	
Spotsylvania	0.57	0.92	Dead End	Tribble Road	SR 658 (Mount Olive Road)	
Stafford	1.75	2.82	SR 630 (Courthouse Road)	Aquia Creek Road	Dead End	
Surry	0.12	0.19	Cul-de-Sac	Elberon Heights Road	SR 31 (Rolfe Highway)	
Sussex	0.04	0.06	SR 35 (Jerusalem Plank Road)	Unnamed road	SR 634	
Tazewell	7.03	11.31	Dead End	Litz Lane Gose Mill Road	SR 625 (Banks Ridge Road)	Gap between segments ending at different points along SR 623
Washington	2.84	4.57	SR 647 (Old Jonesboro Road)	Mock Knob Road Cleveland Road	Tennessee state line	Gap between segments ending at different points along SR 665
Westmoreland	1.90	3.06	SR 606 (Tucker Hill Road)	Wilton Road	Dead End	
Wise	1.60	2.57	SR 631	Unnamed road	SR 630	
Wythe	5.38	8.66	SR 625 (Crockett Road)	Tabernacle Road New Bethel Road Unnamed road Hogback Road	SR 680 (Black Lick Road)	Gap between segments ending at different points along SR 667
York	0.15	0.24	SR 238 (Yorktown Road)	Coburn Court	Newport News city limits	
