= Virginia State Route 668 =

State highway in Virginia, United States

State Route 668

Route information
- Maintained by VDOT

Location
- Country: United States
- State: Virginia

Highway system
- Virginia Routes; Interstate; US; Primary; Secondary; Byways; History; HOT lanes

State Route 668 (SR 668) in the U.S. state of Virginia is a secondary route designation applied to multiple discontinuous road segments among the many counties. The list below describes the sections in each county that are designated SR 668.

== List ==
County	Length (mi)	Length (km)	From	Via	To	Notes
Accomack	1.20	1.93	SR 661 (John Cane Road)	Bailey Road Nocks Lane	SR 176 (Parksley Road)	Gap between segments ending at different points along SR 669
Albemarle	7.90	12.71	Dead End	Batton Road Walnut Level Road Walnut Hill Road Fox Mountain Road Chapel Spring Lane	SR 601 (Free Union Road)	Gap between segments ending at different points along SR 810 Gap between segments ending at different points along SR 671
Alleghany	0.30	0.48	US 220 (Hot Springs Road)	Valley View Drive	US 220 (Hot Springs Road)	
Amelia	0.08	0.13	SR 608 (Little Patrick Road)	Tabernacle Church Lane	Dead End	
Amherst	0.26	0.42	Dead End	Saw Log Lane	SR 661 (Stage Road)	
Appomattox	1.60	2.57	SR 667 (Hummingbird Lane)	Little Dogwood Road	SR 647 (Spout Spring Road)	
Augusta	0.20	0.32	SR 902 (Circle Lane)	Bingham Road	Rockingham County line	
Bath	0.10	0.16	SR 666 (Church Street)	High Street	SR 633	
Bedford	14.95	24.06	SR 709 (New London Road)	Blackwater Road Goode Road Goode Station Road Crockett Road	SR 646 (Bethany Church Circle)	Gap between segments ending at different points along US 460 (Lynchburg Salem Turnpike)
Bland	0.05	0.08	Dead End	Long Spur School Road	SR 602 (Spur Branch Road)	
Botetourt	2.71	4.36	SR 655 (Old Fincastle Road)	Mount Pleasant Church Road	SR 666 (White Church Road)	
Brunswick	1.90	3.06	North Carolina state line	Baird Road	SR 626 (Gasburg Road)	
Buchanan	0.98	1.58	Dead End	Little Garden Road	SR 624	
Buckingham	4.11	6.61	Dead End	Hunting Shack Road Old Tower Hill Road	SR 617 (Gravel Hill Road)	
Campbell	0.35	0.56	Dead End	Ellen Drive	SR 682 (Leesville Road)	
Caroline	3.50	5.63	Spotsylvania County line	Summit Crossing Road Long Branch Road	SR 2 (Fredericksburg Turnpike)	Gap between segments ending at different points along SR 609
Carroll	5.62	9.04	US 52 (Main Street)	Virginia Street Cavalier Drive Hayfield Road	SR 886 (Island Creek Drive)	
Charlotte	2.30	3.70	SR 40 (Patrick Henry Highway)	Stockdale Road	SR 667 (Hillcroft Road)	
Chesterfield	9.47	15.24	SR 603 (Skinquarter Road)	Duval Road Woolridge Road	US 60 (Midlothian Turnpike)	Gap between segments ending at different points along SR 667 Gap between segments ending at different points along SR 604 Gap between a dead end and SR 950
Clarke	0.31	0.50	US 340/SR 667	Old Waterloo Road	US 340 (Lord Fairfax Highway)	
Craig	0.22	0.35	Dead End	Boyd Avenue	SR 674 (Chilton Avenue)	
Culpeper	0.30	0.48	SR 663 (Stevensburg Road)	Swamp Poodle Lane	Dead End	
Cumberland	4.31	6.94	SR 637 (Airport Road)	Airport Road	SR 635 (Pleasant Valley Road)	
Dickenson	3.07	4.94	Dead End	Unnamed road	SR 652	
Dinwiddie	1.90	3.06	SR 703 (Carson Road)	Brick Road	SR 604 (Halifax Road)	
Essex	1.45	2.33	SR 602 (Ashdale Road)	Glebe Landing Road	Dead End	
Fairfax	1.86	2.99	Washington Dulles International Airport	McLearen Road	SR 608 (West Ox Road)	
Fauquier	3.20	5.15	US 17 (Marsh Road)	Savannah Branch Road	SR 651 (Sumerduck Road)	
Floyd	2.60	4.18	SR 661 (Thompson Road)	Cannaday School Road	US 221 (Floyd Highway)	
Fluvanna	0.30	0.48	Dead End	Cloverleaf Drive	SR 654 (Cloverdale Road)	
Franklin	3.53	5.68	SR 944 (Crafts Ford Road)	Lovely Valley Road Gilford Road	SR 616 (Morewood Road)	
Frederick	3.60	5.79	SR 672 (Brucetown Road)	Unnamed road Grace Church Road Branson Spring Road	US 11 (Martinsburg Pike)	Gap between segments ending at different points along SR 667 Gap between segments ending at different points along SR 671
Giles	0.17	0.27	SR 613 (Mountain Lake Road)	Biological School Road	Dead End	
Gloucester	1.06	1.71	Dead End	White Hall Road	SR 627 (Cunningham Lane)	
Goochland	0.66	1.06	SR 623 (Hockett Road)	Snead Road	SR 623 (Hockett Road)	
Grayson	5.50	8.85	SR 658 (Comers Rock Road)	Big Ridge Road	SR 611 (Pheasant Run Lane/Caty Sage Road)	Gap between segments ending at different points along SR 662
Greene	0.20	0.32	US 33 (Spotswood Trail)	Peyton Lane	Dead End	
Greensville	0.75	1.21	SR 730 (Low Ground Road)	Quarter Road	Dead End	
Halifax	1.20	1.93	SR 603 (Cody Road)	Tower Lane Straighstone Road	Pittsylvania County line	Gap between segments ending at different points along SR 640
Hanover	1.40	2.25	SR 683 (Terry Road)	Taylor Road	SR 671 (Scotchtown Road)	
Henry	0.23	0.37	SR 57 (Fairystone Park Highway)	Holy Hill Road	Dead End	
Isle of Wight	1.00	1.61	SR 669 (Nike Park Road)	Titus Creek Drive	SR 665 (Smiths Neck Road)	
James City	0.21	0.34	SR 669 (Gilbert Adams Road)	Madison Road	York County line	
King and Queen	0.25	0.40	SR 605 (York River Road)	Morris Lane	Dead End	
King George	0.10	0.16	SR 614 (Potomac Drive)	Fourteenth Street	SR 206/SR 636	
King William	0.15	0.24	SR 630 (Churchville Road)	Episcopal Road	Dead End	
Lancaster	0.72	1.16	SR 625 (Slabtown Road)	Myer Creek Road	Dead End	
Lee	2.60	4.18	SR 667 (Old Nursary Road)	Unnamed road	SR 676 (Lamb Hollow Road)	
Loudoun	3.21	5.17	SR 663 (Taylorstown Road)	Taylorstown Road Ropp Lane	Dead End	Gap between segments ending at different points along SR 672
Louisa	0.25	0.40	SR 208 (Courthouse Road)	Ferncliff Road	Dead End	
Lunenburg	1.70	2.74	SR 602 (Longview Drive)	Berry Road	SR 138 (South Hill Road)	
Madison	0.11	0.18	Dead End	Resettlement Court	SR 688 (Resettlement Road)	
Mathews	0.13	0.21	Dead End	Linden Lane	SR 198	
Mecklenburg	3.00	4.83	SR 669 (Baskerville Road)	Dry Creek Road	SR 664 (Union Level Road)	
Middlesex	0.40	0.64	Dead End	Bunkers Lane	SR 619 (Healys Road)	
Montgomery	0.70	1.13	SR 600 (Piney Woods Road)	Pack Road	SR 669 (Fairview Church Road)	
Nelson	3.30	5.31	Dead End	Kingswood Lane Centenary Road Diggs Mountain Road	SR 653 (Oak Ridge Road)	Gap between segments ending at different points along SR 665
New Kent	0.04	0.06	SR 273 (Farmers Drive)	Motel Drive	Dead End	
Northampton	1.00	1.61	SR 663 (Cherrystone Road)	Robin Road	Dead End	
Northumberland	1.64	2.64	Dead End	Harding Road	SR 609 (Remo Road)	
Nottoway	1.05	1.69	Blackstone town limits	Rocky Bump Road	SR 40 (Darvills Road)	
Orange	0.25	0.40	SR 20 (Constitution Highway)	Old Somerset Road	Dead End	
Page	2.56	4.12	SR 689 (Ida Road)	Valley Burg Road	SR 669 (Lake Arrowhead Road)	
Patrick	1.50	2.41	North Carolina state line	Long Branch Road	SR 669 (Pedigo Ridge Road)	
Pittsylvania	14.49	23.32	Halifax County line	Cody Road Level Run Road Grit Road Ricky Van Shelton Road	Campbell County line	Gap between segments ending at different points along SR 761 Gap between segments ending at different points along SR 640
Powhatan	0.30	0.48	SR 657 (John Tree Hill Road)	Medway Lane	Cul-de-Sac	
Prince Edward	2.90	4.67	SR 664 (Morris Creek Road)	Bell Road	SR 667 (Bloomfield Road)	
Prince George	0.32	0.51	SR 35 (Courtland Road)	Prince George Drive	US 301/SR 156	
Prince William	1.00	1.61	SR 674 (Wellington Road)	Rixlew Lane	SR 234 (Sudley Road)	
Pulaski	0.80	1.29	SR 669 (Cecils Chapel Road)	Clapboard Hollow Road	Dead End	
Rappahannock	0.60	0.97	SR 626 (Tiger Valley Road)	Starks Road	Dead End	
Richmond	0.15	0.24	SR 617 (Normans Corner Road)	Village Lane	US 360 (Richmond Road)	
Roanoke	3.00	4.83	US 220	Yellow Mountain Road	Roanoke city limits	
Rockbridge	0.24	0.39	SR 39 (Maury River Road)	Bethesda Road	SR 39 (Maury River Road)	
Rockingham	6.12	9.85	Dead End	Timber Ridge Road Bingham Road	Augusta County line	Gap between segments ending at different points along SR 605
Russell	2.10	3.38	SR 669 (Seven Springs Hollow Road)	Booker Road	SR 667 (Century Farm Road)	
Scott	0.14	0.23	SR 792 (Slabtown Circle)	Unnamed road	Dead End	
Shenandoah	0.34	0.55	Woodstock town limits	French Woods Road	SR 758 (Cemetery Road)	
Smyth	0.70	1.13	Dead End	Rowland Creek Lane	SR 656 (Red Hill Road)	
Southampton	5.01	8.06	SR 666 (Old Branchville Road)	Clarksburg Road	SR 653 (Pinopolis Road)	
Spotsylvania	2.84	4.57	SR 608 (Massaponax Church Road)	Summit Crossing Road	Caroline County line	
Stafford	0.58	0.93	SR 3 (Kings Highway)	Little Falls Road	Dead End	
Sussex	0.16	0.26	SR 40 Bus	Church Street	SR 658 (Halifax Road)	
Tazewell	1.32	2.12	Dead End	Daniels Road	SR 644 (Horsepen Road)	
Warren	0.20	0.32	Dead End	Theatre Road	SR 55 (Strasburg Road)	
Washington	0.19	0.31	SR 647 (Kings Mill Pike)	White Oak Road	Dead End	
Westmoreland	0.90	1.45	Dead End	Taylor Town Road	SR 202 (Cople Highway)	
Wise	1.60	2.57	SR 844	Unnamed road	SR 844	
Wythe	1.70	2.74	SR 669 (Huckleberry Road)	Kings Grove Lane	SR 625 (Kings Grove Lane/Wyrick Spring Road)	
York	0.13	0.21	SR 641/James City County line	Curtis Drive	SR 720 (Wilkins Drive)	
