= Virginia State Route 663 =

State highway in Virginia, United States

State Route 663

Route information
- Maintained by VDOT

Location
- Country: United States
- State: Virginia

Highway system
- Virginia Routes; Interstate; US; Primary; Secondary; Byways; History; HOT lanes

State Route 663 (SR 663) in the U.S. state of Virginia is a secondary route designation applied to multiple discontinuous road segments among the many counties. The list below describes the sections in each county that are designated SR 663.

== List ==
| County | Length (mi) | Length (km) | From | Via | To | Notes |
|---|---|---|---|---|---|---|
| Accomack | 1.45 | 2.33 | SR 659 (Parsons Road) | Mary N Smith Road | US 13 (Lankford Highway) | |
| Albemarle | 7.10 | 11.43 | SR 743 (Earlysville Road) | Buck Mountain Road Simmons Gap Road | SR 810 (Dyke Road)/SR 664 (Markwood Road) | |
| Alleghany | 0.25 | 0.40 | Dead End | Landis Drive | SR 687 (Jackson River Road) | |
| Amelia | 0.50 | 0.80 | SR 648 (Beaver Pond Creek Road) | Townes Lane | Dead End | |
| Amherst | 13.02 | 20.95 | US 29 Bus/SR 643 | Sunset Drive Brightwells Mill Road Smokey Hollow Road Coolwell Road Izaak Walton Road Kentmoor Farm Road Brightwells Mill Road | SR 622 (Galts Mill Road) | |
| Appomattox | 5.79 | 9.32 | SR 665 (Meadow Drive) | Skyline Road Oak Ridge Road Colemans Mill Road | SR 616 (Wildway Road) | |
| Augusta | 1.61 | 2.59 | End State Maintenance | Crimora Station Lane Mine Branch Road | SR 612 (Crimora Mine Road) | |
| Bath | 0.85 | 1.37 | SR 678 (Indian Draft Road) | Simon Hollow Road | Dead End | |
| Bedford | 4.40 | 7.08 | US 221 (Forest Road) | Perrowville Road | SR 644 (Coffee Road/Old Cifax Road) | |
| Bland | 0.08 | 0.13 | SR 613 (Dry Fork Road) | Dangerfield Drive | Dead End | |
| Botetourt | 1.00 | 1.61 | Dead End | Rhodes Lane | SR 779 (Catawba Road) | |
| Brunswick | 4.50 | 7.24 | SR 665 (Ankum Road) | Huckstep Road | SR 644 (Elam Road) | |
| Buchanan | 0.85 | 1.37 | SR 605 (Russell Fork Road) | Laurel Branch Road | Dead End | |
| Buckingham | 3.75 | 6.04 | SR 661 (Texas School Road/Forest Clay Road) | Woods Road Union Hill Road | SR 660 (Shelton Store Road) | |
| Campbell | 7.89 | 12.70 | SR 615 (Red House Road) | Bethany Road Tweedy Road | SR 648 (Nowlins Mill Road) | Gap between segments ending at different points along SR 606 |
| Caroline | 3.25 | 5.23 | SR 648 (Sunshine Road) | Shumans Road | SR 601 (Mount Vernon Church Road) | |
| Carroll | 4.00 | 6.44 | US 58 (Danville Pike) | River Road | SR 664 (Silverleaf Road) | |
| Charles City | 0.11 | 0.18 | Dead End | Harrison Park Road | SR 607 (Wayside Road) | |
| Charlotte | 3.80 | 6.12 | SR 615 (Rolling Hill Road) | Bear Creek Road | Appomattox County line | |
| Chesterfield | 2.20 | 3.54 | SR 678 (Providence Road) | Elkhardt Road | SR 1686 (Cozy Lane) | |
| Clarke | 1.00 | 1.61 | SR 603 (Castleman Road) | Auburn Road | SR 608 | |
| Craig | 0.70 | 1.13 | SR 42 (Cumberland Gap Road) | Gravel Hill Road | SR 42 (Cumberland Gap Road) | |
| Culpeper | 10.94 | 17.61 | SR 647 (Algonquin Trail) | Batna Road Stevensburg Road Alanthus Road | SR 625 (Mount Zion Church Road) | Gap between a dead end at NS RR and SR 762 |
| Cumberland | 2.90 | 4.67 | SR 45 (Cartersville Road) | Game Farm Road Bigger Road | Dead End | Gap between segments ending at different points along SR 615 |
| Dickenson | 3.48 | 5.60 | SR 63 (Dante Mountain Road) | Unnamed road | SR 652 (Nealy Ridge Road) | |
| Dinwiddie | 1.20 | 1.93 | SR 659 (Jones Road) | Bain Road | SR 665 (Walkers Mill Road) | |
| Essex | 0.20 | 0.32 | Dead End | Ferry Landing Road | US 17 (Tidewater Trail) | |
| Fairfax | 1.46 | 2.35 | SR 5678 (Miller Heights Road) | Miller Road | SR 123 (Chain Bridge Road) | |
| Fauquier | 5.92 | 9.53 | SR 661 (Botha Road) | Covingtons Corner Road Balls Mill Road | SR 643 (Meetze Road) | |
| Floyd | 1.80 | 2.90 | SR 617 (White Oak Grove Road) | Sowers Mill Dam Road | Dead End | |
| Fluvanna | 2.80 | 4.51 | SR 601/SR 1007 | Georges Mill Road | SR 608 (Rising Sun Road) | |
| Franklin | 3.80 | 6.12 | SR 945 (Kemp Ford Road) | Dilliards Hill Road Lakestone Road | Dead End | |
| Frederick | 3.82 | 6.15 | Cul-de-Sac | Tyler Road Payne Road Fair Lane | SR 1354 (Evans Farm Lane) | |
| Giles | 11.29 | 18.17 | Dead End | Sugar Run Road Green Valley Road | SR 730 (Eggleston Road) | Gap between segments ending at different points along SR 659 Gap between segments ending at different points along SR 100 |
| Gloucester | 0.46 | 0.74 | Dead End | George Lane | SR 629 (Free School Road) | |
| Goochland | 0.99 | 1.59 | SR 662 (Willway Drive) | Hickory Drive | Cul-de-Sac | |
| Grayson | 3.25 | 5.23 | SR 658 (Comers Rock Road) | Caty Sage Road | SR 665 (Stones Chapel Road) | |
| Greensville | 0.54 | 0.87 | US 301 | Riegel Road | SR 614 (Crescent Road) | |
| Halifax | 2.10 | 3.38 | SR 360 (Mountain Road) | Carlbrook Road | SR 684 (Hummingbird Lane) | |
| Hanover | 1.25 | 2.01 | SR 626 (Elmont Road) | Gwathmey Church Road Center Street | Ashland town limits | |
| Henry | 5.82 | 9.37 | Martinsville city limits | Barrows Mill Road Remus Street | Dead End | Gap between segments ending at different points along SR 657 |
| Isle of Wight | 0.40 | 0.64 | SR 662 (Whippingham Parkway/Channell Way) | Channel Way | Dead End | |
| James City | 0.08 | 0.13 | SR 656 (Woodside Drive) | Mahogany Lane | SR 655 (Church Street) | |
| King and Queen | 0.31 | 0.50 | Dead End | Scuffletown Road | SR 629 (Walkerton Road) | |
| King George | 0.30 | 0.48 | SR 206 (Dahlgren Road) | Chotank Loop | SR 206 (Dahlgren Road) | |
| King William | 0.20 | 0.32 | SR 629 (Jacks Creek Road) | Jackson Road | Dead End | |
| Lancaster | 0.95 | 1.53 | Dead End | Senora Road | Dead End | |
| Lee | 2.50 | 4.02 | SR 660 (Hardeys Creek Road) | Cedar Creek Church Road | SR 658 (Cedar Hill Road) | |
| Loudoun | 11.81 | 19.01 | SR 674 (Dutchmans Creek Road) | Tollhouse Road Wenner Road Quarter Branch Road Downey Mill Road Taylorstown Road | US 15 (James Monroe Highway) | |
| Louisa | 3.40 | 5.47 | SR 611 (Dongola Road) | Owens Creek Road | US 522 (Cross County Road) | |
| Lunenburg | 3.37 | 5.42 | SR 40 | Tomlinson Road | SR 652 (Ashton Road) | |
| Madison | 4.18 | 6.73 | Dead End | Walkers Mill Lane Willis Road | SR 230 (Wolftown-Hood Road) | Gap between segments ending at different points along SR 662 |
| Mathews | 0.20 | 0.32 | Dead End | Rose Lane | SR 633 (Old Ferry Road) | |
| Mecklenburg | 7.19 | 11.57 | US 1 | Cedar Grove Road Busy Bee Road | SR 664 (Union Level Road) | |
| Middlesex | 1.01 | 1.63 | SR 646/SR 699 | Plainview Road | Dead End | |
| Montgomery | 4.52 | 7.27 | US 11 (Radford Street) | Walton Road | SR 114 (Peppers Ferry Boulevard) | |
| Nelson | 0.65 | 1.05 | Dead End | New Mount Lane | SR 662 (Powells Island Road) | Gap between segments ending at different points along SR 661 |
| New Kent | 0.01 | 0.02 | US 60 (Pocahontas Trail) | Royal Road | SR 622 (Liberty Church Road) | |
| Northampton | 2.02 | 3.25 | Dead End | Cherrystone Road | SR 680 (Townfield Drive) | |
| Northumberland | 1.20 | 1.93 | Dead End | Blackwell Wharf Road | SR 699 (Old Glebe Point Road) | |
| Nottoway | 0.69 | 1.11 | Dead End | McLean Street | SR 624 (First Street Southeast) | |
| Orange | 2.55 | 4.10 | US 522 (Zachary Taylor Highway) | True Blue Road | SR 611 (Raccoon Road) | |
| Page | 1.40 | 2.25 | US 340 | Island Ford Road | Dead End | |
| Patrick | 2.51 | 4.04 | North Carolina state line | Elastic Plant Road | SR 103 (Dry Pond Highway) | |
| Pittsylvania | 3.10 | 4.99 | SR 649 (Sheva Road) | Cedar Hill Road | SR 683 (South Meadows Road) | |
| Powhatan | 0.40 | 0.64 | SR 600 (Saint Emma Drive) | Belmead Road | Dead End | |
| Prince Edward | 4.30 | 6.92 | SR 671 (County Line Road) | Baker Mountain Road | SR 47 (Thomas Jefferson Highway) | |
| Prince George | 0.07 | 0.11 | SR 669 (River Run Road) | Marlboro Avenue | SR 616 (Laurel Springs Road) | |
| Prince William | 4.74 | 7.63 | SR 612 (Yates Ford Road) | Davis Ford Road | SR 294 (Prince William Parkway) | |
| Pulaski | 4.20 | 6.76 | Dead End | Owens Road | SR 605 (Little River Dam Road) | |
| Rappahannock | 1.15 | 1.85 | Dead End | Bear Wallow Road | SR 628 (Dearing Road) | |
| Richmond | 1.00 | 1.61 | SR 620 (Threeway Road) | Thompsontown Road | Dead End | |
| Roanoke | 1.62 | 2.61 | SR 666 (Bandy Road) | Rakes Road Sterling Road Mount Pleasant Boulevard | Dead End | |
| Rockbridge | 6.63 | 10.67 | US 501 (Glasgow Highway) | Unnamed road | US 501 (Glasgow Highway) | |
| Rockingham | 2.41 | 3.88 | Grottoes town limits | Browns Gap Road | Dead End | |
| Russell | 1.70 | 2.74 | SR 661 (Artrip Road) | Rocky Fork Road | SR 615 (Back Valley Road) | |
| Scott | 0.40 | 0.64 | SR 662 | Unnamed road | SR 664 | |
| Shenandoah | 2.79 | 4.49 | US 11 (Old Valley Pike) | Artz Road | Dead End | |
| Smyth | 1.10 | 1.77 | SR 656 (Red Hill Road) | Flatwoods Road | SR 650 (South Fork Road) | |
| Southampton | 7.16 | 11.52 | SR 186 (Hugs Road) | The Hall Road | SR 653 (Little Texas Road) | |
| Spotsylvania | 0.97 | 1.56 | Dead End | Comfort Lane | SR 612 (Stubbs Bridge Road) | |
| Stafford | 0.30 | 0.48 | Dead End | Coakley Lane | SR 655 (Holly Corner Road) | |
| Surry | 0.38 | 0.61 | Dead End | Tower Drive | SR 31 (Rolfe Highway) | Gap between dead ends |
| Sussex | 0.50 | 0.80 | SR 681 (Concord Sappony Road) | Osborne Road Unnamed road | Dead End | |
| Tazewell | 2.20 | 3.54 | West Virginia state line/SR 644 (Bramwell Road) | Unnamed road | West Virginia state line | |
| Warren | 0.40 | 0.64 | Loop | Walnut Drive | SR 745 | |
| Washington | 5.97 | 9.61 | SR 647 (Old Jonesboro Road) | Golden View Drive Shell Road Country Park Road | Dead End | Gap between segments ending at different points along SR 665 Gap between segments ending at different points along SR 75 Gap between segments ending at different points along SR 664 |
| Westmoreland | 1.45 | 2.33 | SR 610 (Tucker Hill Road) | Kelly Road | Dead End | |
| Wise | 3.40 | 5.47 | SR 699 | Unnamed road | SR 72 | |
| Wythe | 2.08 | 3.35 | SR 667 (Old Stage Road) | Unnamed road Bishop Thomas Road | Dead End | Gap between segments ending at different points along US 11 |
| York | 0.55 | 0.89 | SR 622 (Seaford Road) | Robanna Drive | Dead End | |
