= Hattontown, Virginia =

- Unincorporated community
- Location within Northern Virginia Location within Virginia Location within the United States
- Coordinates: 38°56′42″N 77°23′35″W
- Country: United States
- State: Virginia
- County: Fairfax
- GNIS feature ID: 1495664

Hattontown is an unincorporated community in Fairfax County, Virginia, United States. It is on the CDP border of Reston. It was at one time a rural crossroads located at present-day State Routes 665 (Fox Mill Road) and 666 (Monroe Street) and was named for the Hattons, a family that resided in the area. It became overlain by housing subdivisions in more recent years and as of 1979 the name was reported by the United States Geological Survey as having been in little or no usage for decades.
