= Virginia State Route 661 =

State highway in Virginia, United States

State Route 661

Route information
- Maintained by VDOT

Location
- Country: United States
- State: Virginia

Highway system
- Virginia Routes; Interstate; US; Primary; Secondary; Byways; History; HOT lanes

State Route 661 (SR 661) in the U.S. state of Virginia is a secondary route designation applied to multiple discontinuous road segments among the many counties. The list below describes the sections in each county that are designated SR 661.

== List ==
County	Length (mi)	Length (km)	From	Via	To	Notes
Accomack	6.45	10.38	Dead End	Doe Creek Road Drummonds Mill Road John Cane Road Evans Road Johnson Road	SR 666 (Fox Grove Road)	Gap between segments ending at different points along SR 658 Gap between SR 763 and SR 316
Albemarle	0.90	1.45	Dead End	Reas Ford Lane	SR 660 (Reas Ford Road)	
Alleghany	19.08	30.71	SR 600 (East Midland Trail)	Midland Trail Ogles Creek Road Johnson Creek Road	SR 600 (Indian Draft Road)	
Amelia	1.10	1.77	SR 636 (Lodore Road)	Promise Land Road	SR 630 (Winterham Road)	
Amherst	2.37	3.81	SR 663 (Coolwell Road)	Stage Road	US 29 Bus (Amherst Highway)	
Appomattox	1.00	1.61	SR 613 (Spring Grove Road)	Blue Ridge Drive	SR 660 (North Creek Road)	
Augusta	3.25	5.23	Dead End	Horse Head Road	Rockingham County line	
Bath	0.13	0.21	Dead End	Kingtown Lane	US 220 (Ingalls Boulevard)	
Bedford	2.13	3.43	SR 811 (Thomas Jefferson Road)	Bateman Bridge Road Homestead Drive	SR 1415 (Enterprise Drive)	
Bland	0.03	0.05	SR 653 (Osborne Drive)	Parking Lot	Dead End	
Botetourt	1.72	2.77	SR 738 (Webster Road)	Colonial Road	US 221/US 460	
Brunswick	0.90	1.45	SR 662 (Tilman Road)	Spring Bank Road	SR 659 (Doctor Purdy Road)	
Buchanan	0.56	0.90	Dead End	Watkins Branch Road	US 460	
Buckingham	4.20	6.76	SR 607 (Greenway Road)	Forest Clay Road Woods Road Texas School Road	SR 662 (Midland Road)	
Campbell	0.48	0.77	Dead End	Cross Roads Lane	SR 24 (Colonial Highway)	
Caroline	2.40	3.86	SR 603 (County Church Road)	Cedon Road	US 1 (Jefferson Davis Highway)	
Carroll	2.90	4.67	SR 664 (Silverleaf Road)	Marian Road	SR 664 (Silverleaf Road)	
Charles City	0.46	0.74	SR 604 (Warriner Road)	The Loop Road	SR 604 (Warriner Road)	
Charlotte	5.12	8.24	SR 47 (Thomas Jefferson Highway)	Wards Fork Mill Road	Prince Edward County line	
Chesterfield	1.45	2.33	SR 621 (Winterpock Road)	Bethia Road	SR 621 (Winterpock Road)	
Clarke	1.80	2.90	SR 761 (Old Charles Town Road)	Wadesville Road	SR 672 (Swimley Road)	
Craig	0.15	0.24	SR 311 (Paint Bank Road)	Unnamed road	SR 311 (Paint Bank Road)	
Culpeper	4.21	6.78	SR 647 (Algonquin Trail)	Blackjack Road	SR 663 (Batna Road)	
Cumberland	1.40	2.25	SR 654 (Pinegrove Road)	Locust Grove Road	SR 616 (Deep Run Road)	
Dickenson	7.84	12.62	SR 63 (Dante Mountain Road)	Dog Branch Gap Road Unnamed road	Dead End	Gap between segments ending at different points along SR 652 Gap between segments ending at different points along SR 670
Dinwiddie	2.40	3.86	SR 627 (Courthouse Road)	Boisseau Road	SR 613 (White Oak Road)	
Essex	3.45	5.55	SR 637 (Laytons Landing Road)	Kendalls Road	Dead End	
Fairfax	2.38	3.83	SR 620 (Braddock Road)	Old Lee Road Lee Road	US 50 (Lee Jackson Highway)	
Fauquier	6.37	10.25	Dead End	Botha Road Oak Shade Road Schoolhouse Road	SR 805 (Bealetown Road)	Gap between segments ending at different points along SR 28
Floyd	8.65	13.92	SR 888 (Silver Leaf Road)/SR 680	Smartsview Road Thompson Road Cannaday School Road Boothe Creek Road Kings Store Road Jerry Lane	Dead End	Gap between segments ending at different points along SR 681
Fluvanna	0.10	0.16	SR 632 (Ridge Road)	Rescue Lane	US 15 (James Madison Highway)	
Franklin	0.17	0.27	SR 40 (Franklin Street)	Berger Loop	SR 945 (Kemp Ford Road)	
Frederick	11.11	17.88	SR 659 (Burnt Factory Road)	Pine Road Redbud Road Welltown Road Wright Road	West Virginia state line	Gap between segments ending at different points along SR 660 Gap between segments ending at different points along US 11 Gap between segments ending at different points along SR 669
Giles	1.15	1.85	SR 662 (Arch Epton Road)	Midkiff Road Robertson Road	SR 663 (Sugar Run Road)	Gap between dead ends
Gloucester	1.00	1.61	SR 3 (John Clayton Memorial Highway)	Rangtang Road	Dead End	
Goochland	0.55	0.89	Dead End	Salmontown Road	SR 625 (Saint Pauls Church Road)	
Grayson	0.25	0.40	Dead End	Dormitory Lane	SR 728 (Dormitory Lane/Oakhill Road)	
Greene	0.38	0.61	Cul-de-Sac	Mohican Trail	SR 607 (Matthew Mill Road)	
Halifax	0.50	0.80	Pittsylvania County line	High Point Road	SR 660 (Glass Mill Road)	
Hanover	1.83	2.95	US 1 (Washington Highway)	Old Telegraph Road	US 1 (Washington Highway)	
Henry	0.38	0.61	Dead End	Providence Lane	SR 1712 (Trott Circle)	
Isle of Wight	3.11	5.01	SR 1903	Cedar Grove Road Unnamed road	Dead End	Gap between segments ending at different points along US 17
James City	0.45	0.72	SR 669 (Gilbert Adams Road)	Jackson Drive	York County line	
King and Queen	0.68	1.09	Dead End	Brookshire Road	SR 33 (Lewis Puller Memorial Highway)	
King George	0.20	0.32	SR 3 (Kings Highway)	Peerless Road	SR 629 (Round Hill Road)	
King William	0.86	1.38	SR 618 (Acquinton Church Road/Mount Pleasant Road)	Mount Pleasant Road	US 360 (Richmond Tappahannock Highway)	
Lancaster	0.20	0.32	SR 695 (Windmill Point Road)	Antirap Drive	Dead End	
Lee	9.15	14.73	Tennessee state line	Flatwoods Road	SR 758 (Flanary Bridge Road)	
Loudoun	7.90	12.71	SR 662 (Stumptown Road)	Montresor Road Limestone School Road Spinks Ferry Road Chapel Lane	SR 662 (Lucketts Road)	Gap between segments ending at different points along US 15
Louisa	6.10	9.82	SR 610 (Holly Grove Drive)	Crewsville Road	SR 601 (Paynes Mill Road)	
Lunenburg	2.93	4.72	SR 635 (Oral Oaks)	Sixth Street	SR 40 (Main Street)	
Madison	1.00	1.61	Dead End	Trinity Lane	SR 230 (Wolftown-Hood Road)	
Mathews	0.42	0.68	SR 633 (Old Ferry Road)	Chesapeake Drive	Dead End	
Mecklenburg	2.30	3.70	SR 660 (Old Cox Road)	Meadows Road	SR 662 (Wightman Road)	
Middlesex	0.20	0.32	SR 623 (Regent Road)	Unnamed road	Dead End	
Montgomery	2.63	4.23	Christiansburg town limits	Silver Lake Road Chrisman Mill Road Dominion Drive	SR 114 (Peppers Ferry Boulevard)	Gap between segments ending at different points along the Christiansburg town limits
Nelson	4.45	7.16	Dead End	Phoenix Road	SR 655 (Variety Mills Road)	
New Kent	0.18	0.29	Dead End	Vermont Road	SR 660 (Vermont Road)	
Northampton	0.37	0.60	Dead End	Obedience Lane	SR 680 (Townfield Drive)	
Northumberland	0.18	0.29	SR 646 (Fairport Road)	Polly Cove Road	Dead End	
Nottoway	1.30	2.09	US 360 (Patrick Henry Highway)	Woodmans Road	Dead End	
Orange	0.50	0.80	Dead End	Daniel Road	SR 612 (Monrovia Road)	
Page	3.30	5.31	Dead End	Sunnyview Drive	SR 611	Gap between segments ending at different points along US 340
Patrick	8.36	13.45	SR 662 (Collinstown Road)	Danger Mountain Road Creasy Chapel Road Clark House Farm Road	SR 653 (Ayers Orchard Road)	Gap between segments ending at different points along SR 8 Gap between segments ending at different points along SR 631
Pittsylvania	1.10	1.77	Halifax County line	Duck Lane	SR 360 (Old Richmond Road)	
Powhatan	2.03	3.27	Cul-de-Sac	Palmore Road	SR 603 (Rocky Ford Road)	
Prince Edward	2.20	3.54	SR 663 (Baker Mountain Road)	Nursery Road	SR 660 (Heights School Road)	
Prince George	1.09	1.75	Dead End	Redgate Drive Walton Lake Road	SR 649 (Walton Lake Road/Union Branch Road)	
Prince William	1.54	2.48	Clover Hill Road	Godwin Drive	SR 234 (Dumfries Road)	
Pulaski	1.58	2.54	SR 660 (Claytor Lake State Park Road)	Dunkard Road	Dead End	
Rappahannock	0.21	0.34	Dead End	Airy Settle Road	SR 622 (Aaron Mountain Road)	
Richmond	1.98	3.19	US 360 (Richmond Road)	Totuskey Church Road	Dead End	
Roanoke	0.53	0.85	FR-67	Prunty Drive	Dead End	
Rockbridge	2.30	3.70	SR 611 (South Buffalo Road)	Unnamed road	Dead End	
Rockingham	1.35	2.17	Grottoes town limits	Black Rock Road	Augusta County line	
Russell	6.56	10.56	SR 82/SR 600	Artrip Road Barton Lane	Dead End	
Scott	5.83	9.38	SR 619	Alley Valley Road	SR 660 (Obeys Creek Road)	Gap between segments ending at different points along SR 72
Shenandoah	3.31	5.33	US 11 (Old Valley Pike)	Ridgeley Road	SR 600 (Zepp Road)	
Smyth	1.50	2.41	Dead End	Back Meadows Lane	SR 660 (Riverside Road)	
Southampton	5.49	8.84	SR 615 (Hicksford Road)	Fox Branch Road Old Church Road	SR 653 (Little Texas Road)	
Spotsylvania	0.61	0.98	Dead End	Hudgins Road	US 1 Bus (Lafayette Boulevard)	
Stafford	1.10	1.77	Dead End	Norman Road	SR 635 (Decatur Road)	
Surry	0.08	0.13	SR 40 (Martin Luther King Highway)	Pineview Road	Dead End	
Sussex	2.00	3.22	SR 40 (Sussex Drive)	Tyus Road	Dead End	
Tazewell	1.60	2.57	Dead End	Cove Creek Road Deer Field Road	SR 643 (Mud Fork Road)	Gap between segments ending at different points along SR 643
Warren	3.33	5.36	SR 624 (Morgan Ford Road)	Fairground Road	US 522 (Winchester Road)	
Washington	1.20	1.93	SR 645 (Wallace Pike/Wyndale Road)	Black Hollow Road	SR 633 (Countiss Road)	
Westmoreland	1.25	2.01	SR 611 (Peckatone Road)	Jackson Creek Road	Dead End	
Wise	2.35	3.78	SR 658	Unnamed road	SR 658	
Wythe	2.47	3.98	Wytheville town limits	Sally Run Road	SR 600 (Akers Road/Laurel Run Road)	
York	0.65	1.05	Dead End	Piney Point Road	SR 658 (Yorkville Road)	
