= Virginia State Route 667 =

State highway in Virginia, United States

State Route 667

Route information
- Maintained by VDOT

Location
- Country: United States
- State: Virginia

Highway system
- Virginia Routes; Interstate; US; Primary; Secondary; Byways; History; HOT lanes

State Route 667 (SR 667) in the U.S. state of Virginia is a secondary route designation applied to multiple discontinuous road segments among the many counties. The list below describes the sections in each county that are designated SR 667.

== List ==
County	Length (mi)	Length (km)	From	Via	To	Notes
Accomack	0.60	0.97	SR 661 (Evans Road/John Cane Road)	Old County Road	SR 176 (Parksley Road)	
Albemarle	3.50	5.63	SR 601 (Free Union Road)	Catterton Road	SR 665 (Buck Mountain Road)	
Alleghany	0.19	0.31	US 60 (Madison Street)	Wrightstown Avenue	Dead End	
Amelia	2.00	3.22	SR 681 (Clementown Road)	Haw Branch Lane	Dead End	
Amherst	0.17	0.27	SR 677 (Dixie Airport Road)	Pine Acres Drive	SR 748 (Abbits Drive)	
Appomattox	8.20	13.20	US 460 (Richmond Highway)	Hummingbird Lane Falling Creek Road Tin Top Place	SR 605 (Beckham Road/Dreaming Creek Road)	Gap between segments ending at different points along SR 608 Gap between segments ending at different points along SR 611
Augusta	2.07	3.33	US 11 (Lee Jackson Highway)	Dabneys Road	SR 608 (Cold Springs Road)	
Bath	0.16	0.26	SR 666 (Church Street)	Clarkson Lane	SR 633	
Bedford	0.50	0.80	Dead End	Montevideo Road	SR 43 (Virginia Byway)	
Bland	0.49	0.79	Dead End	Bland Farm Road	SR 42 (Blue Grass Highway)	
Botetourt	1.50	2.41	SR 666 (White Church Road)	Switzer Mountain Road	SR 666 (Mount Pleasant Church Road/White Church Road)	
Brunswick	10.60	17.06	SR 644 (Elam Road)	Oak Grove Road Lake Gaston Drive Vineland Road	SR 611 (Dry Bread Road)	Gap between SR 626 and SR 665 Gap between segments ending at different points along SR 46
Buchanan	0.50	0.80	Dead End	Whitts Branch Road	SR 660 (Long Branch Road)	
Buckingham	3.48	5.60	SR 650 (Belle Road)	Belle Branch Road	SR 617 (Gravel Hill Road)	
Campbell	1.17	1.88	US 501 (Campbell Highway)	Stevens Road	Dead End	
Carroll	0.17	0.27	Dead End	Spurlin Ranch Road	SR 679 (Horton Road)	
Charles City	0.22	0.35	SR 664 (Roxbury Industrial Court)	Roxbury Industrial Court	Dead End	
Charlotte	3.17	5.10	SR 727 (Red House Road)	Hillcroft Road	SR 40 (Patrick Henry Highway)	
Chesterfield	10.41	16.75	SR 655 (Beach Road)	Otterdale Road	SR 288 (World War II Veterans Memorial Highway)	
Clarke	0.81	1.30	US 340 (Lord Fairfax Highway)	Old Waterloo Road	US 340 (Lord Fairfax Highway)	
Craig	0.06	0.10	SR 42 (Cumberland Gap Road)	Unnamed road	SR 42 (Cumberland Gap Road)	
Culpeper	1.75	2.82	Culpeper town limits	Nalles Mill Road	SR 666 (Braggs Corner Road)	
Cumberland	1.12	1.80	Dead End	Carter Road	SR 654 (Sunnyside Road)	
Dickenson	0.80	1.29	SR 607	Unnamed road Derby Lane	Dead End	
Dinwiddie	3.20	5.15	SR 666 (Baugh Road)	Malones Road	SR 703 (Carson Road)	
Essex	0.30	0.48	Dead End	Whare Road	SR 684 (Bowlers Road)	
Fairfax	1.73	2.78	Dead End	Pinecrest Road	End of State Maintenance	
Fauquier	4.30	6.92	SR 28/SR 806	Old Dumfries Road	SR 670 (Old Auburn Road/Taylor Road)	Gap between segments ending at different points along SR 603
Floyd	0.60	0.97	SR 681 (Franklin Pike)	Meadow Creek Road	SR 651 (Stuart Road)	
Fluvanna	0.20	0.32	SR 6/SR 690	Old Columbia Road	Goochland County line	
Franklin	1.60	2.57	SR 616 (Morewood Road)	Bremble Drive	Dead End	
Frederick	2.82	4.54	Dead End	Rocky Ford Road Sir Johns Road	Clarke County line	Gap between segments ending at different points along SR 672
Giles	4.40	7.08	SR 670 (Flat Hollow Road)	White Pine Road	SR 670 (Flat Hollow Road)	
Gloucester	0.50	0.80	Dead End	Earnest Lane	US 17 (George Washington Memorial Highway)	
Goochland	6.62	10.65	Fluvanna County line	Old Columbia Road	SR 606 (Hadensville-Fife Road)	
Grayson	0.25	0.40	US 21	Salem Lane	Dead End	
Greene	7.11	11.44	SR 230 (Madison Road)	Middle River Road	Madison County line	
Greensville	1.00	1.61	Dead End	Allen Town Road	SR 611 (Dry Bread Road)	
Halifax	9.84	15.84	SR 57 (Chatham Road)	Leda Road Pumping Hill Road	SR 650 (Mulberry Road)	
Hanover	5.42	8.72	Ashland town limits	Blunts Bridge Road	SR 738 (Old Ridge Road)	
Henry	2.14	3.44	SR 57 (Appalachian Drive)	Koehler Road Commonwealth Boulevard VC Drive	Martinsville city limits	Gap between segments ending at different points along US 220 Bus
Isle of Wight	0.30	0.48	SR 665 (Smiths Neck Road)	Twin Hill Road	Dead End	
James City	0.30	0.48	Dead End	Ron Spring Drive	SR 656 (Woodside Drive)	
King and Queen	1.20	1.93	Dead End	Wrights Dock Road	SR 666 (Tuckers Road)	
King George	0.90	1.45	US 301 (James Madison Parkway)	State Road	Dead End	
King William	0.08	0.13	US 360 (Richmond Tappahannock Highway)	Horse Alley	SR 662 (Sharon Road)	
Lancaster	1.36	2.19	Cul-de-Sac	Kelley Neck Road	SR 611 (Hoecake Road)	
Lee	5.50	8.85	SR 661 (Flatwoods Road)	Old Nursary Road	US 58	
Loudoun	1.11	1.79	SR 672 (Lovettsville Road)	Yakey Lane	Dead End	
Louisa	0.60	0.97	US 522 (Zachary Taylor Highway)	Old Tolersville Road	SR 618 (Fredericks Hall Road)	
Lunenburg	3.10	4.99	SR 662 (Nutbush Road)	Fowkles Road Bregg Street	SR 1008 (Old Court Street)	
Madison	2.03	3.27	Greene County line	Middle River Road Doc Carpenter Road	SR 680 (Gate Road)	Gap between dead ends
Mathews	0.50	0.80	SR 660	Rains Lane	Dead End	
Mecklenburg	1.00	1.61	SR 669 (Baskerville Road)	Wind Road	SR 666 (Twin Cedar Road)	
Middlesex	0.40	0.64	SR 629 (Stormont Road)	Whipoorwill Lane	Dead End	
Montgomery	0.99	1.59	Dead End	Stanley Road	SR 600 (Tyler Road)	
Nelson	3.10	4.99	SR 56	Fork Mountain Lane	Dead End	
New Kent	0.32	0.51	SR 636 (Plum Point Road)	York Road	Dead End	
Northampton	0.20	0.32	SR 642 (Old Cape Charles Road)	Benders Lane	Dead End	
Northumberland	1.86	2.99	SR 609 (Remo Road)	Bogey Neck Road	Dead End	
Orange	1.09	1.75	SR 3 (Germanna Highway)	Vaucluse Road	Dead End	
Page	4.10	6.60	SR 669 (Lake Arrowhead Road)	Dry Run Road	US 211 Bus	
Patrick	0.47	0.76	North Carolina state line	Mears Road	SR 645 (Hatchers Chapel Road)	
Pittsylvania	2.10	3.38	SR 650 (Mulberry Road)	Hermosa Road	SR 40	
Powhatan	0.68	1.09	SR 607 (Huguenot Springs Road)	Manakin Road	Cul-de-Sac	
Prince Edward	5.50	8.85	Charlotte County line	Bloomfield Road	SR 665 (Darlington Heights Road)	
Prince George	1.53	2.46	SR 623 (Rowanty Road)	Johns Road	US 301 (Crater Road)	
Prince William	0.49	0.79	Cul-de-Sac	Buckhall Road	SR 294 (Prince William Parkway)	
Pulaski	0.38	0.61	SR 693 (Lead Mine Road)	Linkous Ferry Road	Dead End	
Rappahannock	0.10	0.16	SR 600 (Woodward Road)	Estes Mill Road	US 211 (Lee Highway)	
Richmond	0.64	1.03	Dead End	Sunnyside Lane	SR 653 (Sanfords Lane)	
Roanoke	1.27	2.04	SR 668 (Yellow Mountain Road)	Mayland Road Old Va Springs Road	Dead End	Gap between segments ending at different points along SR 666
Rockbridge	1.30	2.09	Dead End	Moores Creek Road	SR 612 (Blue Grass Trail)	
Rockingham	1.00	1.61	SR 668 (Timber Ridge Road)	Raines Road	Dead End	
Russell	3.97	6.39	SR 71	Century Farm Road	SR 640 (Reeds Valley Road)	
Scott	1.06	1.71	SR 666	Red Bluff Road Lane	SR 627	
Shenandoah	0.50	0.80	Woodstock town limits	Lupton Road	Dead End	
Smyth	0.30	0.48	SR 613 (Allisons Gap Road)	Surbers Cove Road	Dead End	
Southampton	3.77	6.07	SR 665	Skyes Farm Road Powells Hill Road Unnamed road	SR 743 (Fuller Mills Road)	Gap between segments ending at different points along SR 666 Gap between segments ending at different points along SR 35
Spotsylvania	1.21	1.95	SR 601 (Lawyers Road)	Robinson Road	Cul-de-Sac	
Stafford	0.78	1.26	SR 687 (Hope Road)	Willow Landing Road	Dead End	
Sussex	0.10	0.16	US 301 (Blue Star Highway)	Mongun Lane	SR 736 (Moores Lane)	
Tazewell	2.20	3.54	SR 727 (West End Road)	Medley Valley Road	SR 623 (Burkes Garden Road)	
Warren	0.30	0.48	SR 626	Mitchell Drive	Dead End	
Washington	0.30	0.48	Dead End	Mast Road	SR 724 (Beech Grove Road)	
Westmoreland	0.30	0.48	Dead End	Chatham Village Road	SR 650 (Tidwells Road)	
Wise	1.70	2.74	US 23	Potter Town Road Unnamed road	US 23	
Wythe	6.30	10.14	US 11 (Lee Highway)	Unnamed road Old Stage Road	Wytheville town limits	Gap between segments ending at different points along SR 625
York	0.06	0.10	SR 722 (Richwine Drive)	Jason Drive	SR 722 (Richwine Drive)	
