= Virginia State Route 669 =

State highway in Virginia, United States

State Route 669

Route information
- Maintained by VDOT

Location
- Country: United States
- State: Virginia

Highway system
- Virginia Routes; Interstate; US; Primary; Secondary; Byways; History; HOT lanes

State Route 669 (SR 669) in the U.S. state of Virginia is a secondary route designation applied to multiple discontinuous road segments among the many counties. The list below describes the sections in each county that are designated SR 669.

== List ==
County	Length (mi)	Length (km)	From	Via	To	Notes
Accomack	5.32	8.56	Dead End	Hopkins Road Lee Mont Road Fisher Road	SR 176 (Parksley Road)	Gap between segments ending at different points along SR 763
Albemarle	0.35	0.56	Dead End	Lakeside Drive	SR 675 (Lake Albemarle Road)	
Alleghany	0.35	0.56	Clifton Forge town limits	Old County Road	Dead End	
Amelia	0.70	1.13	SR 681 (Pridesville Road)	Huntington Church Lane	Dead End	
Amherst	4.03	6.49	SR 130 (Amelon Expressway)	Amelon Road Izaak Road Glade Road	SR 663 (Brightwells Mill Road)	Gap between segments ending at different points along SR 677 Gap between dead ends
Appomattox	2.17	3.49	SR 608 (Stonewall Road)	Lyle Thomas Road	SR 608 (Stonewall Road)	
Augusta	1.46	2.35	SR 256 (Weyers Cave Road)	Oakland Farm Road	Rockingham County line	
Bath	0.15	0.24	Dead End	Wilkinson Avenue	US 220 (Ingalls Boulevard)	
Bedford	1.95	3.14	SR 643 (Otterville Road)	Sycamore Drive	Dead End	
Botetourt	1.10	1.77	Dead End	Sprinkle Road	SR 670 (Huff Road)	
Brunswick	3.20	5.15	SR 626 (Gasburg Road)	Drumgole Road	SR 46 (Christanna Highway)	
Buchanan	0.10	0.16	SR 624 (Garden Creek Road)	Garden School Road	Dead End	
Buckingham	2.80	4.51	Dead End	Rocky Mountain Road Thomas Road	SR 668 (Old Tower Road)	
Campbell	4.13	6.65	SR 680 (Suburban Road)	Dodson Drive Lone Jack Road	SR 664 (Old Rustburg Road)	Gap between segments ending at different points along SR 670
Caroline	2.85	4.59	Spotsylvania County line	Trivette Road Sizer Road	SR 603 (Landora Bridge Road)	Gap between segments ending at different points along SR 738
Carroll	2.05	3.30	Dead End	Camelot Lane Spring Willow Drive Hard Scuffle Road	US 221/SR 100	
Charles City	0.12	0.19	Cul-de-Sac	Unnamed road	SR 631 (Cool Hill Road)	
Charlotte	0.78	1.26	Dead End	Sandy Creek Road	SR 40/SR 746	
Chesterfield	6.20	9.98	Dead End	Chesdin Road Church Road Sandy Ford Road	Dead End	Gap between segments ending at different points along SR 628
Clarke	0.24	0.39	US 340 (Lord Fairfax Highway)	Highland Corners Road	US 522 (Front Royal Pike)	
Craig	0.37	0.60	SR 638	Unnamed road	SR 617	
Culpeper	5.98	9.62	SR 3 (Germanna Highway)	Carrico Mills Road	SR 762 (Brandy Road)	
Cumberland	2.50	4.02	SR 45 (Cumberland Road)	Tarwallet Road Criss Road	Dead End	Gap between segments ending at different points along US 60
Dickenson	2.60	4.18	SR 652	Unnamed road	SR 670 (Lick Creek Road)	
Dinwiddie	3.30	5.31	SR 605 (Monks Neck Road/Old Stage Road)	Old Stage Road	SR 604 (Halifax Road)	
Essex	0.25	0.40	SR 627 (Mountain Landing Road)	Foggs Loop	SR 627 (Mountain Landing Road)	
Fairfax	6.22	10.01	SR 645 (Lees Corner Road)	Thompson Road Bennett Road Stuart Mill Road	SR 671 (Birdfoot Lane)	Gap between SR 7140 and SR 7292 Gap between segments ending at different points along SR 608 Gap between segments ending at different points along SR 665
Fauquier	1.90	3.06	SR 602 (Rogues Road)	Ringwood Road	SR 603 (Greenwich Road)	
Floyd	1.19	1.92	SR 670 (Goff Road)	Wilson Cemetery Road	SR 610 (Daniels Run Road)	
Fluvanna	4.84	7.79	SR 637 (Antioch Road)	Kidds Diary Road	SR 620 (Rolling Road)	
Franklin	0.80	1.29	Dead End	Hermitage Road	SR 944 (Crafts Ford Road)	
Frederick	3.99	6.42	SR 671 (Cedar Hill Road)	Rest Church Road Woodbine Road	SR 671 (Woodside Road)	Gap between segments ending at different points along US 11
Giles	2.45	3.94	Dead End	Sands Road Sandy Bend Road	Dead End	Gap between segments ending at different points along SR 670
Gloucester	1.90	3.06	Dead End	Island Road	SR 610 (Pinetta Road)	
Goochland	3.58	5.76	SR 609 (Hickory Hill Road)	County Line Road	US 250 (Broad Street Road)	
Grayson	3.10	4.99	Dead End	Sugar Camp Lane	SR 825 (Sugar Camp Lane)	
Greene	0.11	0.18	Dead End	Bingham Church Lane	SR 810 (Dyke Road)	
Greensville	0.50	0.80	SR 605	Dwights Lane	Dead End	
Halifax	0.60	0.97	Pittsylvania County line	Evergreen Road	SR 640 (Buffalo Road)	
Hanover	1.54	2.48	SR 54 (Patrick Henry Road)	Independence Road	SR 667 (Blunts Bridge Road)	
Henry	1.73	2.78	SR 606 (Oak Level Road)	Colonial Hill Drive Murry Hill Lane	SR 609 (Daniels Creek Road)	Gap between segments ending at different points along US 220
Isle of Wight	3.63	5.84	US 17 (Carrollton Boulevard)	Smiths Neck Road Nike Park Road	SR 704 (Battery Park Road)	Gap between segments ending at different points along SR 665
James City	0.40	0.64	SR 143 (Merrimac Trail)	Gilbert Adams Road Adams Road	York County line	
King and Queen	1.20	1.93	Dead End	Buzzards Roost Road	Essex County line	
King George	0.40	0.64	SR 631 (Millbank Road)	Woodland Way	Dead End	
King William	0.10	0.16	Dead End	Saint Johns Church Lane	SR 30 (King William Road)	
Lancaster	0.45	0.72	SR 614 (Devils Bottom Road)	Daniel Drive	Dead End	
Lee	3.50	5.63	SR 661 (Flatwoods Road)	Unnamed road	SR 680 (Speaks Branch Road)	
Loudoun	0.92	1.48	SR 672 (Lovettsville Road)	Tankerville Road	SR 668 (Taylorstown Road)	
Louisa	8.60	13.84	US 33 (West Main Street)	Ellisville Drive	Orange County line	
Lunenburg	2.30	3.70	SR 670 (Overton Road)	Couches Creek Road	SR 667 (Bregg Street)	
Madison	0.30	0.48	SR 604 (Towles Road)	Sawmill Road	SR 609 (Hoover Road)	
Mathews	0.51	0.82	SR 223 (Cricket Hill Road)	Mill Point Road	Dead End	
Mecklenburg	10.23	16.46	SR 615 (Redlawn Road)	Baskerville Road	SR 664 (Union Level Road)	
Middlesex	0.60	0.97	SR 619 (Burhans Wharf Road)	Brandon Point Road	Dead End	
Montgomery	9.44	15.19	SR 693 (Childress Road)	Fairview Church Road Union Valley Road Patterson Drive	Roanoke County line	Gap between SR 615 and SR 637
Nelson	0.64	1.03	SR 671 (Stage Road/Old Stage Road)	Bowling Drive	US 29 (Thomas Nelson Highway)	
New Kent	0.32	0.51	SR 30/SR 33 (Eltham Road)	Virginia Avenue	Dead End	
Northampton	0.40	0.64	Dead End	Vincent Lane	SR 600 (Seaside Road)	
Northumberland	7.12	11.46	Dead End	Bluff Point Road Kent Point Road Prentice Creek Road Apple Grove Road Waddys Road	SR 605 (Mount Olive Road)	Gap between segments ending at different points along SR 608 Gap between segments ending at different points along SR 607 Gap between segments ending at different points along SR 606
Nottoway	1.30	2.09	US 460	Green Gable Road	SR 605 (Daniel Road)	
Orange	9.83	15.82	Louisa County line	Marquis Road	SR 671 (Village Road)	
Page	5.80	9.33	Luray town limits	Fairview Road Valley Burg Road Lake Arrowhead Road Jewell Hollow Road	Shenandoah National Park boundary	Gap between segments ending at different points along SR 611
Patrick	3.92	6.31	SR 773 (Ararat Highway)	Pedigo Ridge Road	SR 614 (Unity Church Road)	
Pittsylvania	1.30	2.09	SR 603 (Wyatts Road)	Melon Road	Halifax County line	
Powhatan	0.24	0.39	SR 313 (Beaumont Learning Center Road)	Bateau Landing Road	Dead End	
Prince Edward	1.10	1.77	SR 670 (Spring Creek Road)	Moose Creek Road	SR 664 (Morris Creek Road)	
Prince George	0.05	0.08	Dead End	River Run Road	SR 663 (Marlboro Avenue)	
Prince William	0.42	0.68	SR 671 (Colvin Lane)	Airlea Drive	Dead End	
Pulaski	1.82	2.93	SR 693 (Lead Mine Road)	Cecils Chapel Road	Dead End	
Rappahannock	1.50	2.41	SR 613	Rollins Ford Road	Dead End	
Richmond	0.05	0.08	SR 614 (Suggets Point Road)	Headley Lane	Dead End	
Roanoke	2.27	3.65	Montgomery County line	Patterson Drive	SR 644 (County Line Road)	
Rockbridge	1.20	1.93	SR 670 (Borden Road)	Beatty Hollow Road Unnamed road	US 60	Gap between dead ends
Rockingham	1.00	1.61	Dead End	Beards Ford Road Diehls Ford Road	SR 668 (Timber Ridge Road)	
Russell	4.70	7.56	SR 71	Seven Springs Hollow Road	SR 683 (Memorial Drive)	
Scott	6.91	11.12	SR 71 (Nicklesville Highway)	Mineral Hill Lane Ball Field Road Hales Spring Road	SR 675 (Midway Road)	
Shenandoah	1.00	1.61	Woodstock town limits	Hottel Road	Dead End	
Smyth	1.10	1.77	Dead End	Matson Street Unnamed road	SR 752	
Southampton	1.50	2.41	SR 668 (Clarksburg Road)	Unnamed road	SR 658 (Cedar View Road)	
Spotsylvania	3.95	6.36	Caroline County line	Log Cabin Road Trivette Road Butler Road Smith Road	Caroline County Line	Gap between segments ending at different points along SR 738
Stafford	1.20	1.93	SR 218 (White Oak Road)	Little Whim Road	SR 608 (Brooke Road)	
Sussex	0.57	0.92	Dead End	Maplewood Avenue	SR 1203 (Hartley Street)	Gap between segments ending at different points along SR 668
Tazewell	1.40	2.25	SR 618 (Road Ridge Turnpike)	Premier Road	SR 804 (Red Ash Camp Road)	
Warren	0.30	0.48	US 340 (Stonewall Jackson Highway)	Dogwood Lane	Dead End	
Washington	0.52	0.84	SR 664 (Lake Road)	Bowman Road	SR 75 (Green Spring Road)	
Westmoreland	0.90	1.45	SR 3 (Kings Highway)	Old Park Road Tobacco Road	Dead End	
Wise	0.02	0.03	SR 601	Unnamed road	SR 78	
Wythe	4.30	6.92	SR 670 (Zion Church Road/Sharons Drive)	Old King Road Huckleberry Road Unnamed road Huckleberry Road Windy Hill Drive	SR 699	Gap between segments ending at different points along SR 674
York	0.10	0.16	Dead End	Hidden Lane	SR 626 (Shirley Road)	
