= Virginia State Route 647 =

State highway in Virginia, United States

State Route 647

Route information
- Maintained by VDOT

Location
- Country: United States
- State: Virginia

Highway system
- Virginia Routes; Interstate; US; Primary; Secondary; Byways; History; HOT lanes

State Route 647 (SR 647) in the U.S. state of Virginia is a secondary route designation applied to multiple discontinuous road segments among the many counties. The list below describes the sections in each county that are designated SR 647.

== List ==
County	Length (mi)	Length (km)	From	Via	To	Notes
Accomack	5.70	9.17	SR 789 (Locustville Road)	Stonehouse Road	SR 605 (Seaside Road)	
Albemarle	0.80	1.29	SR 22 (Louisa Road)	Maxfield Road	Dead End	
Alleghany	0.86	1.38	Covington city limits	Mallow Road	SR 648 (Horse Mountain View Road)	
Amherst	7.22	11.62	Dead End	Waughs Ferry Crossing Minors Branch Road	SR 635 (Buffalo Springs Turnpike)	
Appomattox	9.07	14.60	SR 679 (Double Bridges Road)	Salem Road Spout Spring Road	SR 613 (Spring Grove Road)	Gap between segments ending at different points along US 460
Augusta	1.67	2.69	US 11 (Greenville Avenue)	Unnamed road Hammond Lane	Dead End	
Bath	0.57	0.92	Dead End	Perry Hollow Road	US 220 (Ingalls Boulevard)	
Bedford	0.80	1.29	US 501 (Lee Jackson Highway)	Winding Creek Lane	SR 761 (Holcomb Rock Road)	
Bland	0.32	0.51	Dead End	Willow Springs Road	SR 625 (Poor Valley Road)	
Botetourt	0.70	1.13	Dead End	Lemon Lane Houston Mines Road	SR 640 (Nace Road)	
Brunswick	2.35	3.78	SR 655 (Meredith Mill Road)	Green Chapel Road	SR 681 (Pleasant Grove Road)	
Buchanan	5.00	8.05	Dead End	Unnamed road	SR 646 (Guesses Fork Road)	
Buckingham	0.65	1.05	Dead End	Willow Lake Road	SR 56 (James River Highway)	
Campbell	0.28	0.45	Dead End	Mary Ann Drive	US 460 Bus	
Caroline	6.31	10.15	US 301 (Richmond Turnpike)	Doggetts Fork Road Reedy Mill Road Asheville Road	SR 654 (Kidds Fork Road)	Gap between segments ending at different points along SR 601 Gap between segments ending at different points along SR 627
Carroll	2.00	3.22	SR 641 (Doe Run Road)	Canas Circle Worrell Memorial Road Pipestream Road	Dead End	Gap between segments ending at different points along SR 640 Gap between segments ending at different points along SR 643
Charles City	0.43	0.69	SR 618 (Adkins Road)	Indian Road	Dead End	
Charlotte	2.10	3.38	SR 619 (Harrisburg Road)	Adams Road	SR 746 (Scuffletown Road)	
Chesterfield	6.16	9.91	SR 653 (Courthouse Road)	Reams Road Hicks Road Walmsley Boulevard	Richmond city limits	
Clarke	0.51	0.82	Dead End	Possum Hollow Lane	SR 613 (Springsbury Road)	
Craig	0.50	0.80	SR 606 (Caldwell Mountain Road)	Unnamed road	Dead End	
Culpeper	16.49	26.54	SR 615 (Rapidan Road)	Willis Ford Road Twin Mountains Road Algonquin Trail Batna Road Revercomb Road	SR 610 (Maddens Tavern Road)	
Cumberland	2.50	4.02	SR 601 (Clinton Road)	Brown Road	SR 654 (Pinegrove Road)	
Dickenson	0.34	0.55	Dead End	Lewis Stone Road	SR 695	
Dinwiddie	7.70	12.39	SR 622 (Baltimore Road)	Doyle Road Nash Road	US 1 (Boydton Plank Road)	Gap between segments ending at different points along SR 646
Essex	0.20	0.32	SR 622 (Latanes Mill Road)	Hailes Bridge Road	SR 620 (Dunbrooke Road)	
Fairfax	4.62	7.44	SR 643 (Henderson Road)	Hampton Road	SR 123 (Ox Road)	
Fauquier	11.96	19.25	Rappahannock County line	Crest Hill Road	SR 719/SR 721 (Free State Road)	
Floyd	4.74	7.63	SR 610 (Hummingbird Lane)	Deer Run Road	US 221 (Floyd Highway)	
Fluvanna	3.50	5.63	SR 649 (Central Plains Road)	Shiloh Church Road	SR 640 (Haden Martin Road)	
Franklin	2.60	4.18	SR 40 (Franklin Street)	Kay Fork Road	SR 660 (Mount Zion Road)	
Frederick	1.99	3.20	SR 277 (Fairfax Pike)	Aylor Road	SR 642 (Tasker Road)	
Giles	2.67	4.30	West Virginia state line	Powell Mountain Road	SR 1024 (Powell Mountain Road)	
Gloucester	1.13	1.82	SR 33 (Lewis Puller Memorial Highway)	Pierce Road	SR 33 (Lewis Puller Memorial Highway)	
Goochland	1.15	1.85	SR 650 (River Road)	Pagebrook Drive	SR 6 (Patterson Avenue)	
Grayson	2.30	3.70	SR 815 (Tanglewood Road)	Stevens Creek Road	SR 604 (Liberty Hill Road)	
Greene	0.25	0.40	Dead End	McMullen Mill Road	SR 637 (South River Road)	
Greensville	0.26	0.42	SR 605 (Chapmans Ford Road)	Green Leaf Inn Road	Dead End	
Halifax	7.89	12.70	SR 667 (Leda Road)	Leda Grove Road Tobacco Road	SR 40 (Stage Coach Road)	Gap between segments ending at different points along SR 603
Hanover	1.00	1.61	SR 606 (Studley Road)	Buckeye Road	Dead End	
Henry	9.88	15.90	US 58 (A L Philpott Highway)	Mountain Valley Road Minter Drive	SR 651 (North Fork Road)	Gap between segments ending at different points along SR 57
Highland	1.01	1.63	SR 632	Unnamed road	Dead End	
Isle of Wight	6.52	10.49	SR 645 (Tar Road)	Pope Swamp Trail Tings Road	SR 620 (Foursquare Road)	Gap between segments ending at different points along SR 644 Gap between segments ending at different points along SR 637
James City	0.46	0.74	SR 676 (Farmville Lane)	Olso Court	SR 676 (Farmville Lane)	
King and Queen	1.80	2.90	Dead End	Milby Town Road	SR 609 (New Hope Road)	
King George	3.00	4.83	SR 645 (Springfield Road)	Shiloh Loop Big Timber Road	SR 625 (Prim Road)	
King William	1.40	2.25	US 360 (Richmond Tappahannock Highway)	Mill Road	SR 600 (River Road)	
Lancaster	2.29	3.69	SR 3 (Historyland Highway)	Chases Road Poplar Neck Road Bald Eagle Road	Dead End	Gap between segments ending at different points along SR 646
Lee	5.87	9.45	SR 662 (Curt Russell Road)	Millers Chapel Road	SR 644	Gap between segments ending at different points along US 58 Gap between segments ending at different points along US 58 Alt
Loudoun	0.56	0.90	SR 641 (Ashburn Road)	Stubble Road	Dead End	
Louisa	2.61	4.20	SR 640 (Old Mountain Road)	Harts Mill Road	US 522 (Cross County Road)	
Lunenburg	5.20	8.37	SR 635 (Oral Oaks Road)	Sneads Store Road	SR 609 (Afton Grove Road)	
Madison	0.11	0.18	US 29 (Seminole Trail)	Hunter Lane	SR 607 (Lillards Ford Road)	
Mathews	0.70	1.13	SR 641 (Pine Hall Road)	Lovers Lane	Dead End	
Mecklenburg	1.80	2.90	SR 620 (Hall Road)	Tolbert Road	SR 626 (Blackridge Road)	
Middlesex	0.63	1.01	Dead End	Bethel Church Road	SR 605 (Canoe House Road)	
Montgomery	0.50	0.80	SR 603 (North Fork Road)	Ironto Road	Dead End	
Nelson	10.40	16.74	Dead End	River Circle Norwood Road Findlay Gap Road Findlay Mountain Drive	SR 56	Gap between segments ending at different points along SR 626
New Kent	3.23	5.20	US 60 (Pocahontas Trail)	Old Telegraph Road	SR 649 (Rockahock Road)	
Northampton	0.30	0.48	Dead End	County Road	SR 646 (Townsend Drive)	
Northumberland	2.00	3.22	US 360 (Northumberland Highway)	Greenfield Road	Dead End	
Nottoway	4.20	6.76	US 360 (East Patrick Henry Highway)	Jennings Ordinary Road	Amelia County line	
Orange	3.53	5.68	SR 639 (Madison Run Road)	Old Gordonsville Road	Orange town limits	
Page	2.09	3.36	Luray town limits	Homestead Drive	SR 766 (Hamburg Road)	Gap between segments ending at different points along SR 652
Patrick	4.82	7.76	SR 645 (Old Orchard Loop)	Mitchells Mill Road	SR 631 (Dobyns Road/Sal Hooker Hollow Road)	Gap between segments ending at different points along SR 646
Powhatan	0.22	0.35	Dead End	Bolling Road	US 522 (Maidens Road)	
Prince Edward	5.40	8.69	US 15 (Farmville Road)	Loman Road Rice Creek Road	SR 630 (Redd Shop Road)	Gap between segments ending at different points along SR 630
Prince George	0.99	1.59	SR 1159 (Haley Road)	Takgach Road	SR 646 (Middle Road)	
Prince William	1.12	1.80	SR 703 (Old Carolina Road)	Carver Road	US 29 (Lee Highway)	
Pulaski	0.25	0.40	Dead End	Vista Road	SR 636 (Alum Springs Road)	
Rappahannock	4.80	7.72	US 522 (Zachary Taylor Avenue)	Crest Hill Road	Fauquier County line	
Richmond	4.10	6.60	Dead End	Hales Point Road	SR 608 (Farnham Creek Road)	
Roanoke	0.40	0.64	US 11 (West Main Street)	Dow Hollow Road	Dead End	
Rockbridge	1.30	2.09	SR 646 (Big Hill Road)	Papaw Road	Dead End	
Rockingham	2.26	3.64	SR 996 (McGaheysville Road)	Judy Lane McGahey Lane	Dead End	
Russell	2.90	4.67	SR 646 (Tunnel Road)	Campbell Hollow Road	SR 620 (Finney Road)	
Scott	2.30	3.70	SR 650	Unnamed road	SR 650	
Shenandoah	0.45	0.72	Dead End	Rocco Road	SR 623 (Back Road)	
Smyth	2.40	3.86	SR 600	Unnamed road Cold Springs Road Unnamed road	SR 645	Gap between segments ending at different points along SR 638
Southampton	5.56	8.95	SR 35 (Main Street)	River Road	SR 719 (Barn Tarvern Road)	
Spotsylvania	3.90	6.28	Dead End	Twilight Lane Blaydes Corner Road	SR 738 (Partlow Road)	
Stafford	0.80	1.29	Dead End	Clift Farm Road	SR 626 (Leeland Road)	
Surry	2.20	3.54	SR 40 (Martin Luther King Highway)	Cypress Swamp Lane	Dead End	
Sussex	0.48	0.77	SR 603 (Church Street)	North Street	SR 679	
Warren	3.08	4.96	SR 55 (John Marshall Highway)	Dismal Hollow Road	SR 624 (Happy Creek Road)	
Washington	10.25	16.50	Bristol city limits	King Mill Pike Old Jonesboro Road	I-81	
Westmoreland	0.37	0.60	Dead End	Dingley Road	SR 3 (Kings Highway)	
Wise	0.42	0.68	Dead End	Unnamed road	SR 640 (Hurricane Road)	
Wythe	3.09	4.97	Wytheville town limits	Lovers Lane Mudlick Road	Dead End	Gap between segments ending at different points along SR 610
York	0.05	0.08	SR 642 (Queens Creek Road)	Maynor Drive	SR 612 (Maynor Drive)	
