= Virginia State Route 632 =

State highway in Virginia, United States

State Route 632

Route information
- Maintained by VDOT

Location
- Country: United States
- State: Virginia

Highway system
- Virginia Routes; Interstate; US; Primary; Secondary; Byways; History; HOT lanes

State Route 632 (SR 632) in the U.S. state of Virginia is a secondary route designation applied to multiple discontinuous road segments among the many counties. The list below describes the sections in each county that are designated SR 632.

== List ==
County	Length (mi)	Length (km)	From	Via	To	Notes
Accomack	1.10	1.77	SR 631 (Hacksneck Road)	Evergreen Road	Dead End	
Albemarle	1.50	2.41	Nelson County Line	Faber Road	US 29 (Monacan Trail)	
Alleghany	2.21	3.56	SR 671 (State Avenue)	Golf Course View	SR 42/SR 269	
Amelia	4.84	7.79	SR 604 (Chula Road)	Dykeland Road	SR 616 (Genito Road)	
Amherst	4.20	6.76	SR 610 (Sandidges Road)	Emmanuel Church Road Franklin Creek Road Emmanuel Church Road Franklin Creek Road	Dead End	Gap between segments ending at different points along SR 631
Appomattox	3.17	5.10	SR 634 (South Fork Road)	Morning Star Road	SR 627 (River Ridge Road)	
Augusta	1.86	2.99	US 340 (Stuarts Draft Highway)	Shalom Road	SR 664 (Lyndhurst Road)	
Bath	0.55	0.89	Dead End	Crizers Gap	SR 42 (Cow Pasture River Road)	
Bedford	1.30	2.09	Dead End	Stoney Creek Road Extension	Campbell County Line	
Bland	0.24	0.39	SR 602 (Spur Branch Road)	Parcell Drive	Dead End	
Botetourt	0.90	1.45	SR 601 (Thrasher Road)	River Road	Dead End	
Brunswick	3.10	4.99	SR 630 (Sturgeon Road)	Great Oak Road	SR 712 (Old Stage Road)	
Buchanan	8.00	12.87	Russell County Line	Page Drive	SR 624 (Garden Creek Road)	
Buckingham	6.70	10.78	Cumberland County Line	Ca Ira Road Scotts Bottom Road	SR 650 (Belle Road)	
Campbell	0.97	1.56	Bedford County Line	Stony Creek Road	SR 631 (Mount Airy Road)	
Caroline	7.86	12.65	SR 603 (Countyline Church Road)	Quarters Road Cedon Road Edgehill Academy Road	SR 606 (Stonewall Jackson Road)	Gap between segments ending at different points along SR 605
Carroll	1.28	2.06	US 58 (Danville Pike)	Maple Shade Road	Floyd County Line	
Charles City	1.00	1.61	Dead End	Tylers Mill Road	SR 5 (John Tyler Memorial Highway)	
Charlotte	6.05	9.74	SR 605 (Whitlow Road)	Jones Store Road Cargrills Road	SR 640 (Laconia Road)	
Chesterfield	5.66	9.11	SR 631 (Bradley Bridge Road)	Lewis Road Iron Bridge Boulevard South Chalkley Road Chalkley Road	SR 145 (Centralia Road)	Gap between SR 4880 and a cul-de-sac
Clarke	6.57	10.57	SR 657 (Senseny Road)	Triple J Road Crums Church Road	SR 761 (Old Charles Town Road)	
Craig	15.06	24.24	Dead End	Hutchinson Road Johns Creek Road Unnamed road	SR 658	
Culpeper	5.57	8.96	SR 685 (Chestnut Fork Road)	Dutch Hollow Road	SR 629 (Settle School Road)	
Cumberland	3.20	5.15	Buckingham County Line	CA IRA Road	Dead End	
Dickenson	1.00	1.61	Dead End	Unnamed road	SR 83 (Dickenson Highway)	
Dinwiddie	4.20	6.76	SR 631 (Claiborne Road)	Butterwood Road Olgers Road	SR 601 (River Road)	Gap between segments ending at different points along US 460
Essex	4.31	6.94	US 17 (Tidewater Trail)	Level Town Road	Dead End	
Fairfax	0.83	1.34	SR 1319 (Berkley Road)	Forest Hill Road Belle Haven Road	Mount Vernon Memorial Highway	
Fauquier	5.87	9.45	Dead End	Rogers Ford Road Union Church Road Silver Hill Road Brooks Store Road	SR 835 (Morrisville Road)	Gap between segments ending at different points along SR 651 Gap between segments ending at different points along SR 634
Floyd	2.80	4.51	Carroll County Line	Shelor Road Red Ford Road	Dead End	
Fluvanna	5.20	8.37	US 15 (James Madison Highway)	Ridge Road	SR 613 (Bybees Church Road)	
Franklin	12.04	19.38	SR 618 (Muddy Fork Road)	Mount Carmel Road	SR 890 (Snow Creek Road)	Gap between segments ending at different points along SR 619
Frederick	0.41	0.66	Dead End	Sand Mine Road	SR 704 (Back Creek Road)	
Gloucester	2.73	4.39	Dead End	Aberdeen Creek Road	SR 614 (Hickory Fork Road)	
Goochland	5.14	8.27	US 522 (Sandy Hook Road)	Fairground Road	US 250 (Broad Street)	
Grayson	2.83	4.55	Dead End	Cold Springs Lane	SR 626 (Old Baywood Road)	
Greene	3.70	5.95	SR 614 (Brokenback Mountain Road)	Wyatt Mountain Road	SR 627 (Bacon Hollow Road)	
Greensville	4.60	7.40	SR 633 (Pine Log Road)	Massie Branch Road	SR 629 (Lifsey Road)	
Halifax	4.61	7.42	SR 626 (Clarkton Road)	Hog Wallow Road	US 501/SR 40 (L P Bailey Highway)	
Hanover	3.68	5.92	SR 156 (Cold Harbor Road)	Crown Hill Road	SR 628 (McClellan Road)	
Henry	4.82	7.76	North Carolina State Line	Meeks Road Cox Road	SR 636 (Mitchell Road)	Gap between segments ending at different points along SR 622
Highland	1.97	3.17	US 220	Unnamed road	US 220	
Isle of Wight	5.77	9.29	SR 641 (Harvest Drive)	Old Carssville Road Old Myrtle Road	Suffolk City Limits	
James City	1.49	2.40	SR 611 (Jolly Pond Road)	Cranstons Mill Pond Road	SR 631 (Chickahominy Road)	
King and Queen	1.79	2.88	SR 633 (Stones Road)	Hockley Neck Road	SR 631 (Poor House Lane/Bunker Hill Road)	
King George	0.90	1.45	SR 206/SR 218	Berthaville Road	SR 206 (Dahlgren Road)	
King William	13.66	21.98	SR 30 (King William Road)	Mount Olive-Cohoke Road	SR 629 (Jacks Creek Road)	Reported location of the Cohoke Light
Lancaster	2.54	4.09	Dead End	Indiantown Road Johns Neck Road	Dead End	
Lee	0.89	1.43	US 58 Alt	Right Poor Valley Road	SR 621 (Cave Springs Road/Right Poor Valley Road)	
Loudoun	1.80	2.90	Dead End	Aldie Dam Road	US 50 (John S Mosby Highway)	
Louisa	4.40	7.08	SR 649 (Byrd Mill Road)	Waldrop Church Road	US 33 (Louisa Road)	
Lunenburg	3.10	4.99	Mecklenburg County Line	Newcomb Bridge Road	SR 630/SR 760	
Madison	2.80	4.51	SR 634 (Oak Park Road)	Beahm Town Road	SR 630 (Thoroughfare Road)	
Mathews	0.50	0.80	SR 626 (Hallieford Road)	Godfrey Bay Road	Dead End	
Mecklenburg	1.80	2.90	Dead End	Stumps Dead End Fort Mitchell Road	Lunenburg County Line	Gap between segments ending at different points along SR 682
Middlesex	0.90	1.45	Dead End	Paces Neck Road	SR 633 (Providence Road)	
Montgomery	0.50	0.80	Dead End	Ambrose Drive	SR 633 (Dark Run Road)	
Nelson	3.55	5.71	SR 639 (Laurel Road)	Pond Road Faber Road	Albemarle County Line	
New Kent	6.94	11.17	SR 627 (Stage Road)	Stage Road	SR 30 (New Kent Highway)	
Northampton	0.70	1.13	Dead End	Indian Walk Lane	SR 600 (Seaside Road)	
Northumberland	1.00	1.61	US 360 (Northumberland Highway)	Kingston Road	Dead End	
Nottoway	2.14	3.44	US 460 (Virginia Avenue)	Sunnyside Road	SR 617 (Winningham Road)	
Orange	1.08	1.74	US 15	Montebello Road	Dead End	
Page	1.95	3.14	SR 638 (Aylor Grubbs Avenue)	Unnamed road	US 340 Bus	Gap between segments ending at different points along SR 631
Patrick	2.45	3.94	SR 636 (Free Union Road)	Dan River Road	US 58 (Jeb Stuart Highway)	
Pittsylvania	1.70	2.74	SR 640 (Wards Road/Renan Road)	Waller Road	SR 631 (Dews Road)	
Powhatan	1.00	1.61	Dead End	Evans Road	SR 13 (Old Buckingham Road)	
Prince Edward	8.20	13.20	SR 633 (Mount Pleasant Road)	Falkland Road Schultz Mill Road	SR 696 (Green Bay Road)	Gap between segments ending at different points along SR 630
Prince George	0.17	0.27	SR 618 (Hollywood Road/Hitchcock Road)	South Hampton Road	Dead End	
Prince William	0.22	0.35	SR 2100 (Tanyard Hill Road)	Herndon Drive	SR 641 (Old Bridge Road)	
Pulaski	0.77	1.24	SR 747 (Old Route 11)	Darst Avenue Dunlap Road	SR 1030 (Bagging Plant Road)	
Rappahannock	0.65	1.05	US 522 (Zachary Taylor Avenue)	Black Rock Ford Road	Fauquier County Line	
Richmond	2.64	4.25	Dead End	Islington Road	SR 3 (Historyland Highway)	
Roanoke	0.87	1.40	SR 904 (Starkey Road)	Unnamed road Crescent Boulevard	SR 904 (Starkey Road)	
Rockbridge	0.50	0.80	Dead End	Hall Place Drive	SR 638	
Rockingham	0.25	0.40	SR 619 (Phillips Store Road)	Spitzer Road	Dead End	
Russell	5.17	8.32	SR 67 (Swords Creek Road)	Lynn Springs Road	Buchanan County Line	
Scott	11.24	18.09	Tennessee State Line	Unnamed road Cowan Gap Tunnel Unnamed road	SR 713 (Frisco Yard Road)	
Shenandoah	0.80	1.29	SR 55 (John Marshall Highway)	Mumaw Road	SR 55 (John Marshall Highway)	
Smyth	3.49	5.62	SR 91 (Main Street)	Cedar Branch Road	SR 633 (Beaver Creek Road)	
Southampton	0.80	1.29	SR 643	Sedly Road	SR 641 (Johnsons Mill Road)	
Spotsylvania	5.48	8.82	US 1 (Jefferson Davis Highway)	Roxbury Mill Road Hickory Ridge Road	SR 608 (Massaponax Church Road)	Gap between dead ends
Stafford	0.41	0.66	Dead End	Southern View Drive	SR 628 (Eskimo Hill Road)	
Surry	1.59	2.56	SR 616 (Golden Hill Road)	Chapel Bottom Road	SR 10 (Colonial Trail)	
Sussex	10.60	17.06	SR 631 (Gary Road)	Unnamed road Gilliam Road Hunting Quarter Road Unnamed road Robinson Road	SR 626 (Courthouse Road)	Gap between segments ending at different points along SR 634
Tazewell	1.20	1.93	US 19/US 19 Bus	Pisgah Road	Tazewell Town Limits	
Warren	1.10	1.77	Dead End	Fetchett Road	SR 631	
Washington	2.30	3.70	US 58 (Gate City Highway)	Walker Mountain Road	SR 630 (Marys Chapel Road)	
Westmoreland	1.62	2.61	SR 205	New Monrovia Road	SR 205	
Wise	5.30	8.53	Dead End	Unnamed road	SR 83	
Wythe	1.60	2.57	SR 634 (Lots Gap Road)	Danner Road	SR 736 (Apache Run)	
York	1.00	1.61	SR 718 (Hornsbyville Road)	Old Wormley Creek Road	Dead End	
