= Virginia State Route 633 =

State highway in Virginia, United States

State Route 633

Route information
- Maintained by VDOT

Location
- Country: United States
- State: Virginia

Highway system
- Virginia Routes; Interstate; US; Primary; Secondary; Byways; History; HOT lanes

State Route 633 (SR 633) in the U.S. state of Virginia is a secondary route designation applied to multiple discontinuous road segments among the many counties. The list below describes the sections in each county that are designated SR 633.

== List ==
County	Length (mi)	Length (km)	From	Via	To	Notes
Accomack	2.25	3.62	Dead End	Back Creek Road Mason Beach Road	End State Maintenance	Gap between segments ending at different points along SR 631
Albemarle	9.45	15.21	Nelson County Line	Taylor Creek Road Heards Mountain Trail Heards Mountain Road Cove Garden Road	SR 712 (Plank Road)	Gap between segments ending at different points along US 29
Alleghany	2.30	3.70	Botetourt County Line	McKinney Hollow Road Sharon Lane	SR 269 (Longdale Furnace Road)	
Amelia	1.37	2.20	SR 609 (Grub Hill Church Road)	Meade Road	SR 632 (Dykeland Road)	
Amherst	1.20	1.93	SR 605 (Pedlar River Road)	Fiddlers Green Way	SR 634 (Coffey Town Road)	
Appomattox	5.42	8.72	SR 630 (Old Evergreen Road)	Spruce Drive Hixburg Road	SR 627 (Hixburg Road/River Ridge Road)	
Augusta	1.00	1.61	SR 610 (Howardsville Turnpike)	Patton Farm Road	SR 634 (China Clay Road)	
Bath	15.31	24.64	Rockbridge County Line	Unnamed road Tunnel Hill Road Main Street Unnamed road	SR 629 (Deerfield Road)	Gap between segments ending at different points along SR 42
Bedford	2.45	3.94	Dead End	Gravel Hill Road	SR 634 (Hardy Road)	
Bland	0.65	1.05	Dead End	Short Ridge Drive	SR 631 (Pinch Creek Road)	
Botetourt	6.28	10.11	Dead End	Wood Town Road Glen Wilton Road McKinney Hollow Road	SR 699 (Soldiers Retreat Road)/Alleghany County Line	Gap between segments ending at different points along SR 622
Brunswick	8.27	13.31	SR 634 (Reedy Creek Road)	Big Horn Road Pocahontas Road Robin Road	SR 609 (Cutbank Road)	Gap between segments ending at different points along SR 607 Gap between segments ending at different points along SR 608
Buchanan	0.50	0.80	SR 628 (Horn Mountain Road)	Horn Mountain	Dead End	
Buckingham	15.78	25.40	Cumberland County Line/SR 600	School Road Bishop Creek Road Rock Mill Road Oak Hill Road Courthouse Road	US 60 (James Anderson Highway)	Gap between segments ending at different points along SR 640 Gap between segments ending at different points along US 60
Campbell	12.44	20.02	SR 705 (Covered Bridge Road)	Goat Island Road Epsons Road Phelps Creek Road	SR 605 (Swinging Bridge Road)	Gap between segments ending at different points along SR 761
Caroline	8.54	13.74	SR 601 (Golansville Road)	Bull Church Road Nancy Wrights Drive	Dead End	Gap between segments ending at different points along SR 632
Carroll	2.40	3.86	SR 608 (Pilot View Road)	Keno Road	SR 640 (Keno Road)	
Charles City	0.25	0.40	Dead End	Sterling Heights Lane	SR 640 (Herring Creek Road)	
Charlotte	2.90	4.67	SR 608 (Tobacco Hill Road)	Horse Horn Road	SR 608 (Tobacco Hill Road)	
Chesterfield	1.30	2.09	SR 628 (Hickory Road)	Rowlett Road	SR 634 (Cattail Road)	
Clarke	2.30	3.70	SR 652	Annfield Road	US 340 (Lord Fairfax Highway)	
Craig	0.70	1.13	Dead End	Red Barn Trail	SR 632	
Culpeper	13.93	22.42	US 29 (James Monroe Highway)	Reva Road Hudson Mill Road Norman Road Stonehouse Mountain Road Drogheda Mountain Road Alum Springs Road	SR 229 (Rixeyville Road)	
Cumberland	5.00	8.05	Dead End	Agee Lane Vogel Road Rock Creek Road	SR 629 (Oak Hill Road)	Gap between segments ending at different points along SR 45
Dickenson	4.33	6.97	Dead End	Strouth Road Unnamed road Strouth Road	Dead End	Gap between segments ending at different points along SR 72
Dinwiddie	0.50	0.80	SR 226 (Cox Road)	Addison Street	SR 226 (Cox Road)	
Essex	0.27	0.43	US 17 (Tidewater Trail)	Hunters Hill Road	Dead End	
Fairfax	2.55	4.10	SR 611 (Telegraph Road)	Kings Highway South	SR 241 (Kings Highway)	
Fauquier	1.00	1.61	SR 615 (Silver Hill Road)	Dyes Road	US 17 (Marsh Road)	
Floyd	0.25	0.40	Dead End	Transfer Station Road	SR 710 (Storkers Knob Road)	
Fluvanna	2.00	3.22	SR 600 (North Boston Road)	North Boston Road	SR 631 (Troy Road)	
Franklin	0.83	1.34	SR 635 (Edwardsville Road)	Winterhill Road Lynville Mountain Road	SR 681 (Coopers Cove Road)	Gap between dead ends
Frederick	1.81	2.91	SR 625	Klines Mill Road	Dead End	
Giles	0.18	0.29	SR 794 (Apple Drive)	Mutter Lane	Cul-de-Sac	
Gloucester	2.84	4.57	Dead End	Cedar Bush Road	SR 614 (Hickory Fork Road)	
Goochland	2.12	3.41	US 522 (Sandy Hook Road)	Poor House Road	SR 634 (Maidens Road)	
Grayson	1.65	2.66	SR 625 (Kemps River Road/Mount Olivet Road)	Mount Olivet Road Crestview Road	SR 623 (Greenwich Road)	Gap between segments ending at different points along SR 624
Greene	10.90	17.54	SR 810 (Dyke Road)	Amicus Road Dairy Road	US 29 (Seminole Trail)	Gap between segments ending at different points along US 33
Greensville	11.97	19.26	North Carolina State Line	Pine Log Road Independence Church Road	Dead End	Gap between segments ending at different points along SR 611
Halifax	1.50	2.41	SR 634 (Elder Road)	Turkey Track Lane	Dead End	
Hanover	1.44	2.32	SR 156 (Cold Harbor Road)	Beulah Church Road	SR 635 (Sandy Valley Road)	
Henry	0.18	0.29	Dead End	Beechwood Drive	SR 669 (Colonial Hill Drive)	
Highland	0.80	1.29	Dead End	Unnamed road	SR 634	
Isle of Wight	1.53	2.46	SR 641 (Colosse Road)	Rhodes Drive	SR 612 (Spivey Town Road)	
James City	5.40	8.69	Dead End	Bush Neck Road Jolly Pond Road	SR 614 (Centerville Road)	
King and Queen	11.53	18.56	Dead End	Bendley Lane Rose Mount Road Stones Road Mantua Road Stones Road	SR 14 (The Trail)/SR 631 (Poor House Lane)	Gap between segments ending at different points along SR 634 Gap between segments ending at different points along SR 629
King George	0.69	1.11	US 301 (James Madison Parkway)	Will Loop	Dead End	
King William	7.90	12.71	Dead End	Powhatan Trail	SR 30 (King William Road)	Formerly SR 293
Lancaster	0.15	0.24	Dead End	Carters Creek Road	SR 634 (King Carter Drive)	
Lee	1.60	2.57	US 421	South Fork River Road	SR 621 (Right Poor Valley Road)	
Loudoun	0.90	1.45	Dead End	Sally Mill Road	US 50 (John S Mosby Highway)	
Louisa	1.30	2.09	SR 649 (Byrd Mill Road)	Lasley Lane	SR 613 (Poindexter Road)	
Lunenburg	2.25	3.62	Mecklenburg County Line	Rocky Mill Road	SR 49 (Courthouse Road)	
Madison	0.61	0.98	Dead End	Crawford Lane	SR 621 (Seville Road)	
Mathews	2.86	4.60	Dead End	Cricket Hill Road Old Ferry Road	Dead End	
Mecklenburg	5.30	8.53	Dead End	Scots Crossroads	Lunenburg County Line	
Middlesex	1.42	2.29	Dead End	Providence Road	SR 33 (General Puller Highway)	
Montgomery	1.90	3.06	Dead End	Dark Run Road	US 11 (Roanoke Road)	
Nelson	5.84	9.40	Dead End	Blundell Hollow Road Woodland Lane Taylor Creek Road	Albemarle County Line	Gap between segments ending at different points along SR 6/SR 151 Gap between segments ending at different points along SR 635
New Kent	1.70	2.74	SR 632 (Stage Road)	Barham Road	SR 30 (New Kent Highway)	Gap between segments ending at different points along SR 273
Northampton	1.70	2.74	Dead End	Captain Howe Lane Simpkins Drive	SR 600 (Seaside Road)	Gap between segments ending at different points along US 13
Northumberland	0.40	0.64	Dead End	Pole Thicket Road	SR 614 (Walmsley Road)	
Nottoway	4.33	6.97	Dead End	Lone Pine Road	SR 49 (Earl Davis Gregory Highway)	
Orange	3.97	6.39	SR 616 (Montford Road)	Spicers Mill Road	Orange Town Line	
Page	3.35	5.39	SR 616 (Leaksville Road)	Mill Creek Crossroads	US 340 Bus	
Patrick	0.70	1.13	Dead End	Shortridge Lane	SR 748 (Hainted Rock Lane)	
Pittsylvania	7.16	11.52	Dead End	Easome Road Clover Road Stone Mill Road	SR 640 (Wards Road)	Gap between segments ending at different points along SR 668
Powhatan	0.26	0.42	SR 617 (Old River Trail)	Monte Road	Dead End	
Prince Edward	5.56	8.95	US 360 (Kings Highway)	Virso Road Mount Pleasant Road	US 15 (Farmville Road)	
Prince William	1.81	2.91	Dumfries Town Limits	Possum Point Road	Dead End	
Pulaski	0.56	0.90	SR 747 (Old Route 11)	Powell Avenue	SR 1046 (Riggs Street)	
Rappahannock	1.50	2.41	Dead End	Battle Run Road	SR 627 (Long Mountain Road)	
Richmond	2.51	4.04	SR 637 (Piney Grove Road)	Scates Road	SR 690 (Menokin Road)	
Roanoke	0.35	0.56	Dead End	Benois Road	SR 904 (Starkey Road)	
Rockbridge	3.33	5.36	Bath County	Rockbridge Alum Springs Road	SR 850 (Midland Trail)	
Russell	5.70	9.17	SR 67 (Swords Creek Road)	Clarks Valley Road	Dead End	
Shenandoah	1.05	1.69	Dead End	Red Bud Road	SR 55 (John Marshall Highway)	
Smyth	6.52	10.49	SR 610 (Valley Drive)	Possum Hollow Road	SR 91 (Saltville Highway)	
Southampton	6.70	10.78	SR 616 (Ivor Road)	Saint Luke Road Skyline Road	SR 605 (Millfield Road)	Gap between segments ending at different points along SR 626
Spotsylvania	1.40	2.25	SR 607 (Guinea Station Road)	Church Pond Road	SR 608 (Massaponax Church Road)	
Stafford	2.10	3.38	SR 658 (Brent Point Road)	Arkendale Road	SR 611 (Widewater Road)	
Surry	3.59	5.78	SR 10 (Colonial Trail)	Chippokes Farm Road	Dead End	
Sussex	0.95	1.53	Dead End	Brown Road	SR 621	
Tazewell	0.80	1.29	US 19 Bus	Peery Addition Road	Dead End	
Warren	0.40	0.64	Dead End	Broad Run Road	SR 632 (Fetchett Road)	
Washington	17.73	28.53	Tennessee State Line	Reedy Creek Road Dettor Lane Countiss Road Black Hollow Road Everett Hagy Road	US 19 (Porterfield Highway)	Gap between segments ending at different points along US 58 Gap between segments ending at different points along SR 625
Westmoreland	1.53	2.46	SR 628 (Stoney Knoll)	Holly Vista Drive	SR 1302 (Shore Drive)	
Wise	6.19	9.96	SR 693 (Old Indian Creek Road)	Bold Camp Road	SR 634 (Birchfield Road)	
Wythe	0.50	0.80	Dead End	President Jackson Road	SR 634 (Lots Gap Road)	
York	0.10	0.16	SR 238 (Washington Road)	Cornwallis Road	SR 676 (Moore House Road)	
