= Byrd Road Act =

1932 Act of the Virginia General Assembly

Example of a route sign for Virginia's Secondary Roads

The Byrd Road Act was an Act of Assembly passed in February 1932 by the Virginia General Assembly. Named for former Governor Harry F. Byrd, the legislation was originally presented as measure to relieve the financial pressures of the Great Depression upon the counties, as the state offered to take over responsibility and control of most county roads, creating the Virginia Secondary Roads System.

Under state auspices, much was accomplished in improving the state's roads, most of which were not hard-surfaced when the system was created. However, lack of local control and accountability over roads became much more of an issue late in the 20th century, especially in fast-growing counties. Following a study commissioned by the Virginia Department of Transportation in 1998, which found the arrangement to be "unusual among the 50 states", the state legislature in the early 21st century was considering major changes to afford more local control in the counties over such issues as drainage, speed limits, and planning and coordination of roads with development.

== History ==
The Byrd Road Act created the state's "Secondary System" of roads in the counties. Virginia's incorporated towns were provided a local option to participate, and all the counties in Virginia were given the option of turning this responsibility over to the state. However, Virginia's independent cities were excluded, typical of the Byrd Organization and its leader's rural priorities and political power base.

Only four counties of more than 90 initially opted not to join the system. Of these, Nottoway County opted to join the state system in 1933, and in the 1950s, Warwick County became an independent city and was then consolidated with another, forming the modern City of Newport News. (By the end of the 20th century, only Arlington and Henrico Counties continued to maintain their own roads.)

Generally, when an area became part of an independent city, through annexation, merger, consolidation, or conversions, the secondary roads passed from the state system to local responsibility. An exception was made by the General Assembly in the former Nansemond County, which like Warwick County, became an independent city (in 1972) and then 18 months later, consolidated with neighboring Suffolk in 1974. Under that special arrangement, VDOT maintained secondary routes in Suffolk until July 1, 2006. This arrangement eventually led to new conflicts over ownership and responsibility for the circa 1928 Kings Highway Bridge across the Nansemond River on State Route 125, which was closed in 2005 by VDOT for safety reasons.

== Accomplishments and problems ==
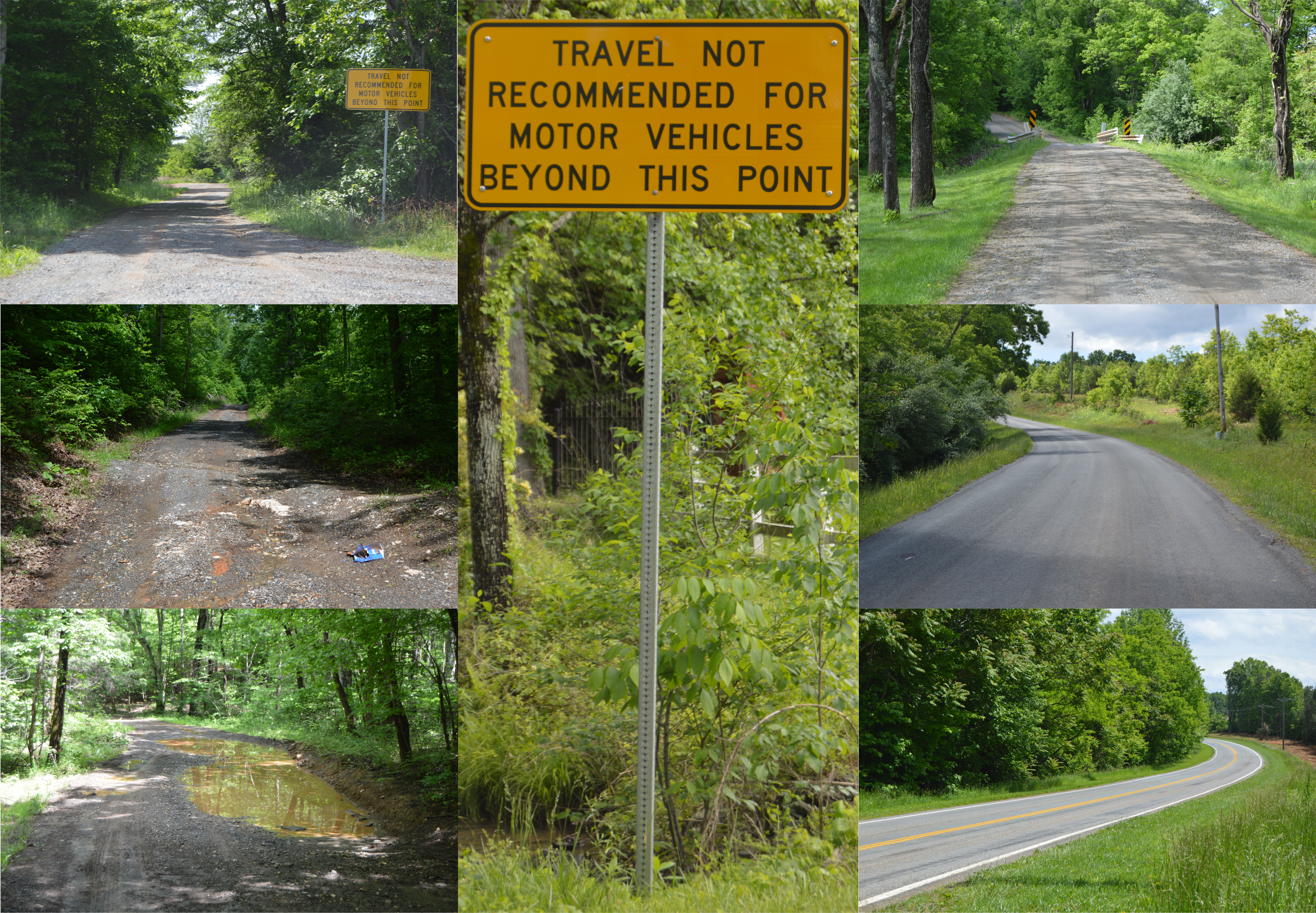
Variations in the quality of secondary state highways. All photos in this montage were taken on State Route 715 in Franklin County; some spots are unsuitable for small cars (left), while others are good-quality highways (right)

In the years after 1932, the state worked diligently on secondary roads. In 1932, there were only 2,000 miles (3,200 km) of hard-surfaced secondary roads, out of almost 36,000 miles (58,000 km). By 1972, there were only 400 miles (640 km) of unpaved secondary roads in Virginia's system.

The state's secondary roads system had also grown by 30% from its original size, despite the large geographical areas (and miles of roadway) lost over the years to expanding and additional independent cities and incorporated towns. In the years from 1952 to 1976, virtually all of the counties in the extreme southeastern portion of the state in the Hampton Roads region became consolidated into independent cities; Princess Anne County, Norfolk County, Nansemond County, Elizabeth City County, and Warwick County all became extinct, although as previously noted, Warwick County was never in the state secondary road system, and the areas of Suffolk that had been Nansemond County received a special exception to stay in the system for an additional 30 years, which ended in 2006. In most other areas of the state, additional towns became incorporated and/or converted to independent city status, and both groups grew in territory, primarily through annexations, such as large portions of Chesterfield County that were annexed by the City of Richmond in 1944 and 1970.

However, despite VDOT's (and its predecessor agencies') accomplishments, the relationship between the counties and the state highway officials since 1932 has always been somewhat strained. The 1932 Act took not only financial responsibility from the counties and transferred it to the state, but power and authority as well. Under the Code of Virginia, as amended, "The Boards of Supervisors or other governing bodies...shall have no control, supervision, management, and jurisdiction over...the secondary system of state highways" (§33.1-69).

== Considering changes in structure, local control ==
Late in the 20th century, the problems inherent in this arrangement became especially apparent with regards to the secondary roads system in many fast-growing suburban counties outside incorporated towns and cities. A state-sponsored study in 1998 focusing on 14 of the fastest-growing counties identified such issues as drainage, speed limits, and planning and coordination of roads with development as those local leaders felt should be within their ability to control, while the authority to do so was in fact, held by a state agency instead. Citizens seeking accountability, accused both the various county and VDOT officials of finger-pointing. According to the report, "Such an arrangement is unusual among the 50 states."

In the early 21st century, the Virginia General Assembly was considering legislation to allow some counties to choose to resume control and care for the secondary highways within their boundaries. James City County, with a population that grew by 56% between 1980 and 1990 according to the 1998 VDOT study, was reported by the local news media to be under consideration for a pilot project of this type. Similarly, in 2009 Fairfax County Chairman Sharon Bulova and County Executive Anthony H. Griffin proposed changing Fairfax County into an Independent City in order to regain local control of the county's secondary roads.

== See also ==
- North Carolina Highway System, consisting of all roads in unincorporated parts of the state
