= Virginia State Route 655 =

State highway in Virginia, United States

State Route 655

Route information
- Maintained by VDOT

Location
- Country: United States
- State: Virginia

Highway system
- Virginia Routes; Interstate; US; Primary; Secondary; Byways; History; HOT lanes

State Route 655 (SR 655) in the U.S. state of Virginia is a secondary route designation applied to multiple discontinuous road segments among the many counties. The list below describes the sections in each county that are designated SR 655.

== List ==
| County | Length (mi) | Length (km) | From | Via | To | Notes |
|---|---|---|---|---|---|---|
| Accomack | 3.88 | 6.24 | SR 653 (Poplar Cove Road) | Plantation Road | SR 657 (Deep Creek Road) | |
| Albemarle | 0.15 | 0.24 | SR 712 (Plank Road) | Christmas Hill Lane | Dead End | |
| Alleghany | 0.21 | 0.34 | Cul-de-Sac | Hatcher Avenue | SR 625 (East Dolly Ann Drive) | |
| Amelia | 3.05 | 4.91 | SR 616 (Genito Road) | Johnson Road | SR 642 (Amelia Springs Road) | |
| Amherst | 4.32 | 6.95 | Dead End | Ned Brown Road Father Judge Road | SR 643 (Kenmore Road) | |
| Appomattox | 0.15 | 0.24 | SR 24 (Old Courthouse Road) | Vera Lane | SR 616 (Wildway Road) | |
| Augusta | 1.60 | 2.57 | US 11 (Lee Jackson Highway) | Walnut Hills Road | US 340 (Stuarts Draft Highway) | |
| Bath | 0.65 | 1.05 | Dead End | Mimrod Drive | SR 42 (Cow Pasture River Road) | |
| Bedford | 11.23 | 18.07 | Dead End | Rock Spring Road Goodview Road Diamond Hill Road Hendricks Store Road Isle of Pines Drive | Dead End | Gap between segments ending at different points along SR 616 Gap between segments ending at different points along SR 122 Gap between segments ending at different points along SR 654 |
| Bland | 0.16 | 0.26 | US 52 (North Scenic Highway) | Elm Drive | Dead End | |
| Botetourt | 10.03 | 16.14 | US 220 (Botetourt Road) | Old Fincastle Road Sunset Drive | US 220 (Botetourt Road) | |
| Brunswick | 1.95 | 3.14 | Dead End | Meredith Mill Road | SR 639 (Old Indian Road) | |
| Buchanan | 4.90 | 7.89 | US 460 | Lynn Camp Road | Dead End | |
| Buckingham | 8.00 | 12.87 | SR 601 (Pattie Road) | Jerusalem Church Road Glenmore Road | SR 20 (Constitution Route) | |
| Campbell | 3.20 | 5.15 | US 501 (Brookneal Highway) | Rocky Road | US 501 (Campbell Highway) | |
| Caroline | 1.76 | 2.83 | SR 656 (Day Bridge Road) | McBryant Road | SR 654 (Moores Mill Road) | |
| Carroll | 0.75 | 1.21 | Dead End | Chisholm Creek Road | SR 656 (Pineview Road) | |
| Charles City | 0.35 | 0.56 | SR 650 (Cattail Road) | Salem Run Road | Dead End | |
| Charlotte | 3.61 | 5.81 | SR 604 (Abilene Road/Roanoke Bridge Road) | Bethlehem Road | SR 671 (County Line Road) | |
| Chesterfield | 15.09 | 24.29 | SR 603 (Beaver Bridge Road) | Beach Road Lori Road | SR 10 (Iron Bridge Road) | |
| Clarke | 3.90 | 6.28 | SR 644 (Ford Road) | Ginns Road Salem Church Road Opequan Road | Frederick County line | Gap between segments ending at different points along SR 723 |
| Craig | 0.33 | 0.53 | SR 659 | Unnamed road | SR 673 | |
| Culpeper | 2.95 | 4.75 | Dead End | Somerville Road | SR 652 (Mitchell Road) | |
| Cumberland | 0.40 | 0.64 | SR 616 (Deep Run Road) | Oak Lane Road | Dead End | |
| Dickenson | 2.70 | 4.35 | SR 627 (Long Ridge Road) | Unnamed road | SR 63 (Dante Mountain Road) | |
| Dinwiddie | 0.58 | 0.93 | Dead End | Little Deer Road | US 1 (Boydton Plank Road) | |
| Essex | 0.31 | 0.50 | Dead End | Vineyard Road | SR 611 (Johnville Road) | |
| Fairfax | 4.53 | 7.29 | SR 620 (Braddock Road) | Shirley Gate Road Jermantown Road Blake Lane | US 29 (Lee Highway) | Gap between US 29 and Fairfax city limits |
| Fauquier | 4.80 | 7.72 | SR 28 (Catlett Road) | Lucky Hill Road Tinpot Run Lane | SR 651 (Main Street) | Gap between segments ending at different points along SR 656 |
| Floyd | 6.87 | 11.06 | Pulaski County line | Pulaski Road Macks Mountain Road Sumpter Road Higgs Road | SR 787 (Indian Valley Road) | |
| Fluvanna | 3.95 | 6.36 | Dead End | Glenarvon Road West Bottom Road | US 15 (James Madison Highway) | |
| Franklin | 5.28 | 8.50 | SR 40 (Franklin Street) | Webster Road | Dead End | |
| Frederick | 2.39 | 3.85 | US 17/US 50 (Millwood Pike) | Sulphur Spring Road | Clarke County line | |
| Giles | 0.43 | 0.69 | SR 730 (Eggleston Road) | Whitaker Lane | Dead End | |
| Gloucester | 1.20 | 1.93 | SR 641 (Low Ground Road) | Zack Road | Dead End | |
| Goochland | 0.12 | 0.19 | SR 670 (Cardwell Road) | Old Mill Road | Dead End | |
| Grayson | 3.00 | 4.83 | SR 656 (Pilgrim Fork Road) | Jerusalem Road | SR 604 (Jerusalem Road) | |
| Greene | 0.21 | 0.34 | Dead End | Cardinal Court | SR 619 (Dundee Road) | |
| Greensville | 0.30 | 0.48 | SR 730 (Low Ground Road) | Unnamed road | SR 624 (Steel Bridge Road) | |
| Halifax | 1.20 | 1.93 | SR 711 (Harmony Road) | Blane Road | SR 658 (Turbeville Road) | |
| Hanover | 0.60 | 0.97 | SR 656 (Mount Hermon Road) | Jennings Road | SR 798 (Goddins Hill Road) | |
| Henry | 3.90 | 6.28 | SR 57 | Green Hill Drive | SR 657 (Dyers Store Road) | |
| Highland | 0.15 | 0.24 | SR 632 | Unnamed road | Dead End | |
| Isle of Wight | 2.72 | 4.38 | SR 620 (Factory Road) | Great Springs Road | Smithfield town limits | |
| James City | 0.32 | 0.51 | US 60 (Pocahontas Trail) | Church Street | SR 648 (Whiting Avenue) | |
| King and Queen | 1.00 | 1.61 | Dead End | Courthouse Landing Road | SR 681 (Allens Circle) | |
| King George | 1.57 | 2.53 | SR 632 (Berthaville Road) | Saint Pauls Road | Cul-de-Sac | |
| King William | 0.50 | 0.80 | Dead End | Ayletts Road | SR 600 (River Road) | |
| Lancaster | 1.09 | 1.75 | SR 625 (Slabtown Road) | Queenstown Road | Dead End | |
| Lee | 0.55 | 0.89 | Dead End | Lizzie Minor Road | SR 653 (Maple Hill Road) | |
| Loudoun | 1.30 | 2.09 | US 15 (James Monroe Highway) | Whites Ferry Road | Potomac River, White's Ferry | |
| Louisa | 6.20 | 9.98 | US 33 (Jefferson Highway) | Bethany Church Road | SR 609 (Buckner Road) | Gap between segments ending at different points along SR 601 |
| Lunenburg | 13.76 | 22.14 | SR 635 (Oral Oaks Road) | Plank Road | SR 637 (Craig Mill Road) | |
| Madison | 1.40 | 2.25 | Dead End | Glebe Lane | SR 231 (Blue Ridge Turnpike) | |
| Mathews | 0.85 | 1.37 | Dead End | Dutchmans Road | SR 600 (Circle Drive) | |
| Mecklenburg | 7.39 | 11.89 | SR 664 (Union Level Road) | Skyline Road Chalk Level Road | SR 764 (Piney Creek Road) | Gap between segments ending at different points along SR 47 |
| Middlesex | 0.21 | 0.34 | Dead End | Ferry Road | SR 3 (Twiggs Ferry Road) | |
| Montgomery | 5.76 | 9.27 | SR 652 (McCoy Road) | Mount Zion Road Glade Road | Meadowbrook Drive | |
| Nelson | 14.74 | 23.72 | SR 626 (Norwood Road) | Arrington Road Variety Mills Road Arlington Road Colleen Road Roseland Road | SR 151 | Gap between segments ending at different points along SR 56 |
| New Kent | 0.22 | 0.35 | SR 636 (Plum Point Road) | Old Ferry Road | Dead End | |
| Northampton | 1.00 | 1.61 | SR 600 (Seaside Road) | Magotha Road | Dead End | |
| Northumberland | 0.40 | 0.64 | Dead End | Roseland Road | SR 726 (Liberty Road) | |
| Nottoway | 0.80 | 1.29 | SR 625 (Courthouse Road) | Williamson Road | Dead End | |
| Orange | 8.75 | 14.08 | SR 644 (Ridge Road) | Blue Run Road Weyburn Road Jacksontown Road | SR 639 (Jacksontown Road/Chicken Mountain Road) | Gap between segments ending at different points along SR 20 Gap between segments ending at different points along SR 231 |
| Page | 0.08 | 0.13 | Luray town limits | Atkins Drive | Dead End | |
| Patrick | 0.86 | 1.38 | North Carolina state line | Moir Martin Road Craddock Lane | Dead End | |
| Pittsylvania | 4.91 | 7.90 | Danville city limits | Tom Fork Road Shawnee Road | SR 730 (Countryside Drive) | |
| Powhatan | 1.10 | 1.77 | US 522 (Maidens Road) | Kool Lane | Dead End | |
| Prince Edward | 0.23 | 0.37 | US 460 (Prince Edward Highway) | Railroad Avenue | SR 626 (Prospect Road/Pin Oak Road) | |
| Prince George | 1.00 | 1.61 | SR 646 (Sandy Ridge Road) | Kiser Drive | Dead End | |
| Prince William | 1.03 | 1.66 | SR 656 (Kettle Run Road) | Schaeffer Lane | SR 215 (Vint Hill Road) | |
| Pulaski | 0.82 | 1.32 | Blue Ridge Scout Reservation | Max Creek Road | Dead End | |
| Rappahannock | 0.10 | 0.16 | US 522 (Zachary Taylor Avenue) | Short Road | SR 620 (Fletchers Mill Road) | |
| Richmond | 1.25 | 2.01 | Dead End | Riverdale Road | SR 614 (Suggets Point Road) | |
| Roanoke | 0.20 | 0.32 | Dead End | Oakey Dulin Road | SR 311 (Catawba Valley Drive) | |
| Rockbridge | 5.10 | 8.21 | Dead End | Unnamed road | SR 657 (Green Hill Road/Blacks Creek Road) | |
| Rockingham | 8.21 | 13.21 | US 33 (Spotswood Trail) | Penn Laird Drive Lawyer Road | SR 253 (Port Republic Road) | |
| Russell | 1.26 | 2.03 | Dead End | Belcher Hollow Road | SR 620 (Paul Barrett Road) | |
| Scott | 3.90 | 6.28 | SR 654 | Unnamed road | Dead End | |
| Shenandoah | 2.40 | 3.86 | SR 623 (Back Road) | Harrisville Road | SR 653 (Brook Creek Road) | |
| Smyth | 2.40 | 3.86 | SR 656 (Red Hill Road) | Sugar Street | SR 656 (Red Hill Road) | |
| Southampton | 5.98 | 9.62 | SR 653 (Carys Bridge Road) | Rock Spring Road Brandy Pond Road | SR 609 (Popes Station Road) | Gap between segments ending at different points along SR 652 |
| Spotsylvania | 3.23 | 5.20 | SR 208 (Courthouse Road) | Ridge Road | SR 601 (Lawyers Road) | |
| Stafford | 5.29 | 8.51 | Dead End | Holly Corner Road | US 17 (Warrenton Road) | |
| Surry | 0.60 | 0.97 | SR 617 (White Marsh Road) | Saints Road | Dead End | |
| Sussex | 5.37 | 8.64 | SR 625 (Newville Road) | Oakdale Road Unnamed road | SR 606 | |
| Tazewell | 7.54 | 12.13 | SR 680 (Hurt Road) | Joe Hunt Road Tin Top Road Joe Hunt Road Gass Road | SR 644 (Abbs Valley Road) | Gap between segments ending at different points along SR 650 Gap between segments ending at different points along SR 643 |
| Warren | 0.85 | 1.37 | Dead End | Country Club Drive | US 522 (Winchester Road) | |
| Washington | 2.10 | 3.38 | SR 640 (Benhams Road) | Oak Grove Road | SR 645 (Wallace Pike) | |
| Westmoreland | 0.38 | 0.61 | Dead End | Troy Farm Road | SR 637 (Rappahannock Road) | |
| Wise | 2.90 | 4.67 | SR 611 | Unnamed road | Dead End | |
| Wythe | 2.10 | 3.38 | SR 684 | High Bridge Road | SR 667 (Old Stage Road) | |
| York | 1.20 | 1.93 | SR 630 (Wolf Trap Road) | Allens Mill Road | SR 644 (Old Dare Road) | Gap between segments ending at different points along SR 621 |
