= Virginia State Route 648 =

State highway in Virginia, United States

State Route 648

Route information
- Maintained by VDOT

Location
- Country: United States
- State: Virginia

Highway system
- Virginia Routes; Interstate; US; Primary; Secondary; Byways; History; HOT lanes

State Route 648 (SR 648) in the U.S. state of Virginia is a secondary route designation applied to multiple discontinuous road segments among the many counties. The list below describes the sections in each county that are designated SR 648.

== List ==
County	Length (mi)	Length (km)	From	Via	To	Notes
Accomack	6.16	9.91	SR 657 (Edgar Thomas Road/Merry Branch Road)	Merry Branch Road Daugherty Road Custis Neck Road	Dead End	Gap between segments ending at different points along SR 605
Albemarle	1.90	3.06	Dead End	Clarks Tract	SR 22 (Louisa Road)	
Alleghany	0.76	1.22	Dead End	Horse Mountain View Road	I-64/US 60	
Amelia	3.00	4.83	SR 608 (Little Patrick Road)	Beaver Pond Creek Road	SR 38 (Five Forks Road)	
Amherst	2.91	4.68	Dead End	Beck Creek Road	SR 663 (Brightwells Mill Road)	
Appomattox	7.80	12.55	US 460 (Richmond Highway)	Reedy Spring Road Gala Lake Road	SR 650 (Narrow Passage Road)	Gap between segments ending at different points along SR 679
Augusta	3.74	6.02	SR 647 (Hammond Lane)	Christians Creek Road	SR 608 (Tinkling Spring Road)	
Bath	0.44	0.71	Dead End	Lotts Road	US 220 (Ingalls Boulevard)	
Bedford	0.40	0.64	SR 122 (Moneta Road)	Piney Grove School Road	Dead End	
Bland	0.49	0.79	US 52 (North Scenic Highway)	Angles Pass Drive	Dead End	
Botetourt	2.61	4.20	Roanoke County line	Reservoir Road	Dead End	
Brunswick	2.30	3.70	SR 46 (Christanna Highway)	Great Creek Road	SR 644 (Brunswick Drive)	
Buchanan	1.90	3.06	Dead End	Pounding Mill Branch Road	SR 643 (Hurley Road)	
Buckingham	2.65	4.26	US 60 (James Anderson Highway)	Katrine Road	SR 649 (Slate River Mill Road)	
Campbell	12.42	19.99	SR 643 (Lewis Ford Road)	Three Creeks Road Suck Creek Road Nowlins Mill Road	SR 646 (Spring Mill Road)	Gap between segments ending at different points along SR 615
Caroline	4.38	7.05	US 301 (Richmond Turnpike)	Sunshine Road	US 301 (Richmond Turnpike)	
Carroll	4.93	7.93	SR 608 (Boundary Road)	Willis Gap Road Windover Road Excelsior School Road	US 58 (Danville Pike)	
Charles City	0.30	0.48	Dead End	New Quarter Run Road	SR 607 (Church Lane)	
Charlotte	5.58	8.98	SR 746 (Scuffletown Road)	Hannah Road	SR 619 (Harrisburg Road)	
Chesterfield	0.40	0.64	US 360 (Hull Street Road)	Lockhart Road	SR 647 (Hicks Road)	
Clarke	0.08	0.13	Dead End	Lanham Lane	SR 255 (Bishop Meade Highway)	
Craig	0.42	0.68	Dead End	Herndon Avenue	SR 42 (Main Street)	
Culpeper	2.20	3.54	Dead End	Peacock Lane Cedar Ridge Road	US 15 (James Madison Highway)	Gap between segments ending at different points along US 15
Cumberland	0.15	0.24	Dead End	Parker Road	SR 616 (Deep Run Road)	
Dickenson	1.90	3.06	SR 649 (DC Caney Ridge Road)	Unnamed road	SR 649 (DC Caney Ridge Road)	
Dinwiddie	1.50	2.41	SR 650 (Lew Jones Road)	Hudgins Road	SR 647 (Nash Road)	
Essex	0.20	0.32	SR 684 (Howerton Road)	Old Howerton Road	Dead End	
Fairfax	2.55	4.10	SR 617 (Backlick Road)	Edsall Road	Alexandria city limits	
Fauquier	1.80	2.90	SR 602 (Rogues Road)	Ebenezer Church Road	SR 610 (Midland Road)	
Floyd	3.73	6.00	SR 642 (Conner Road)	Graysville Road Jacks Mill Road	US 221 (Floyd Highway)	
Fluvanna	0.90	1.45	SR 649 (Central Plains Road)	Turner Road	SR 647 (Shiloh Church Road)	
Franklin	2.17	3.49	SR 605 (Henry Road)	Stanley Branch Road	SR 837 (Marshall Hill Road)	
Frederick	1.51	2.43	SR 631 (Fairfax Street/Marlboro Road)	Passage Road	SR 649 (Springdale Road)	
Giles	1.08	1.74	West Virginia state line	Elgood Mountain Road Ball Avenue	West Virginia state line	Gap between segments ending at different points along US 460/SR 704
Gloucester	1.30	2.09	Dead End	Maundys Creek Road Horse Point Road	Dead End	Gap between segments ending at different points along SR 649
Goochland	2.00	3.22	SR 610 (Community House Road)	Matthews Road	SR 606 (Hadensville-Fife Road)	
Grayson	1.50	2.41	SR 94 (Scenic Road)	Mandolin Drive Providence Road	SR 805 (Spring Valley Road)	
Greene	1.80	2.90	SR 603 (Bingham Mountain Road)	Chapman Road	SR 604 (Celt Road)	
Greensville	1.20	1.93	SR 630 (River Road)	Felts Road	Dead End	
Halifax	3.70	5.95	SR 696 (Henderson Road)	Mason Chapel Road	SR 699 (Mount Caramel Road)	
Hanover	0.90	1.45	SR 660 (Winns Church Road)	Rocky Ridge Road	SR 623 (Cedar Lane)	
Henry	5.42	8.72	US 58/SR 620 (Al Philpott Highway)	Stoney Mountain Road	SR 57	
Highland	0.80	1.29	SR 619	Unnamed road	Dead End	
Isle of Wight	2.00	3.22	SR 614 (River Run Trail)	Duck Town Road	SR 641 (Bows and Arrows Road)	
James City	0.61	0.98	US 60 (Pocahontas Trail)	Howard Drive Whiting Avenue	SR 692 (Railroad Street)	Gap between segments ending at different points along SR 654
King and Queen	1.40	2.25	Dead End	Kingston Road	SR 605 (Plain View Lane)	
King George	1.21	1.95	Dead End	Winston Place	SR 609 (Comorn Road)	
King William	1.00	1.61	SR 30 (King William Road)	White Bank Road	Dead End	
Lancaster	0.83	1.34	SR 647 (Poplar Neck Road/Chases Road)	Poplar Neck Road	Dead End	
Lee	2.23	3.59	SR 614 (Sandy Ridge Road)	Emmit Allen Farm Road Ridgeview Road Town Branch Road Unnamed road	US 58 Alt	
Loudoun	1.41	2.27	Dead End	Gulick Mill Road	SR 625 (Sycolin Road)	
Louisa	5.80	9.33	US 522 (Cross County Road)	Gardners Road Jouett School Road	SR 609 (Buckner Road)	
Lunenburg	1.81	2.91	SR 647 (Sneads Store Road)	Mayflower Road	SR 637 (Craig Mill Road)	
Madison	1.71	2.75	Dead End	Finks Hollow Lane	SR 670 (Old Blue Ridge Turnpike)	
Mathews	0.30	0.48	SR 639 (Crabe Neck Road)	Big Gum Road	SR 640 (Point Breeze Road)	
Mecklenburg	0.64	1.03	Dead End	Lafayette Road	SR 677 (Wilkerson Road)	
Middlesex	1.97	3.17	SR 604 (Nesting Road)	Montague Island Road	Dead End	
Montgomery	2.11	3.40	Blacksburg town limits	Bishop Road	Dead End	
Nelson	1.50	2.41	SR 56	Deer Run Road Eagle Mountain Drive	SR 56	
New Kent	0.14	0.23	SR 249 (New Kent Highway)	Courthouse Circle	SR 249 (New Kent Highway)	
Northampton	0.80	1.29	US 13 Bus	Stumptown Drive	Dead End	
Northumberland	0.80	1.29	Dead End	Wicomico Point Road	SR 644 (Ferry Road)	
Nottoway	0.40	0.64	SR 641 (Cedar Run Road)	Pridgen Lane	Dead End	
Orange	1.07	1.72	Dead End	Browntown Road	SR 643 (Cox Mill Road)	
Page	1.26	2.03	US 340	Sandy Hook Road	SR 654	Formerly SR 280
Patrick	6.30	10.14	SR 773 (Ararat Highway)	Kibler Valley Road	Dead End	
Pittsylvania	1.71	2.75	SR 969 (Sago Road)	Smith Road	SR 652 (Cavalry Road)	
Powhatan	0.63	1.01	SR 13 (Old Buckingham Road)	Flippen Road	Dead End	
Prince Edward	4.89	7.87	SR 643 (Back Hampden Sydney Road)	Hardtimes Road	SR 695 (Tuggle Road)	
Prince George	0.53	0.85	Dead End	Clary Road	US 301 (Crater Road)	
Prince William	1.73	2.78	SR 649 (Old Church Road)	Bridwell Road Keyser Road	SR 1652 (Clinton Drive)	Gap between dead ends
Pulaski	0.47	0.76	Pulaski town limits	Snider Lane	SR 636 (Alum Springs Road)	
Rappahannock	0.35	0.56	Dead End	Jefferson Road	SR 611 (Seven Ponds Road)	
Richmond	0.70	1.13	SR 647 (Hales Point Road)	Oakley Lane	Dead End	
Roanoke	0.18	0.29	Botetourt County line	Reservoir Road	US 11 (Lee Highway)	
Rockbridge	0.50	0.80	Dead End	Ollie Knick Road	SR 647/SR 749	
Rockingham	1.60	2.57	SR 996 (McGaheysville Road)	Dave Berry Road	SR 641 (White Rose Road)	
Russell	1.80	2.90	SR 620 (Finney Road)	Thackers Branch Road	Dead End	
Scott	1.90	3.06	SR 65	Unnamed road	SR 647	
Shenandoah	2.63	4.23	Dead End	Unnamed road Sandy Hook Road	Strasburg town limits	Gap between dead ends
Smyth	5.02	8.08	SR 762 (White Top Road)	Grinstead Hollow Road	Dead end	Gap between segments ending at different points along SR 647 Gap between segments ending at different points along SR 660
Southampton	1.40	2.25	Dead End	Old Hickory Road	SR 35 (Plank Road)	
Spotsylvania	3.41	5.49	SR 738 (Partlow Road)	Block House Road	SR 208 (Courthouse Road)	
Stafford	5.56	8.95	SR 616 (Poplar Road)	Stefaniga Road Shelton Shop Road	SR 610 (Garrisonville Road)	Gap between segments ending at different points along SR 627
Surry	2.22	3.57	SR 618 (Southwick Road)	Gilpark Road	SR 31 (Rolfe Highway)	
Sussex	6.82	10.98	SR 630 (Little Mill Road)	Unnamed road Reed Road Unnamed road	FR-313	Gap between segments ending at different points along SR 649
Tazewell	0.71	1.14	Tazewell town limits	County Farm Road	Dead End	
Warren	0.22	0.35	Dead End	Spangler Lane	SR 674 (Limeton Church Road)	
Washington	1.50	2.41	SR 647 (Kings Mill Pike)	Sinking Creek Road	Dead End	
Westmoreland	0.50	0.80	SR 645 (Zacata Road)	Stratford Hall Road	SR 643 (Chilton Road)	Gap between dead ends
Wise	0.93	1.50	SR 646 (Coeburn Mountain Road)	Unnamed road	Dead End	
Wythe	0.30	0.48	Dead End	Cody Lane	SR 643 (Old School Road)	
York	0.32	0.51	Dead End	Browns Lane	SR 238 (Yorktown Road)	
