= Virginia State Route 649 =

State highway in Virginia, United States

State Route 649

Route information
- Maintained by VDOT

Location
- Country: United States
- State: Virginia

Highway system
- Virginia Routes; Interstate; US; Primary; Secondary; Byways; History; HOT lanes

State Route 649 (SR 649) in the U.S. state of Virginia is a secondary route designation applied to multiple discontinuous road segments among the many counties. The list below describes the sections in each county that are designated SR 649.

== List ==
| County | Length (mi) | Length (km) | From | Via | To | Notes |
|---|---|---|---|---|---|---|
| Accomack | 0.10 | 0.16 | SR 655 (Plantation Road) | Southside Road | Dead End | |
| Albemarle | 5.74 | 9.24 | SR 20 (Stony Point Road) | Proffitt Road Airport Road | SR 606 (Dickerson Road) | |
| Alleghany | 0.41 | 0.66 | Dead End | Wetground Lane | SR 614 (Castile Road) | |
| Amelia | 1.55 | 2.49 | SR 640 (Buckskin Creek Trail/Perkinson Road) | Frontage Road Lane | SR 607 (West Creek Road) | |
| Amherst | 1.95 | 3.14 | Dead End | Volley Hudson Road Maple Creek Road | SR 647 (Minors Branch Road) | Gap between segments ending at different points along SR 130 |
| Appomattox | 2.79 | 4.49 | SR 604 (Promise Land Road) | County Line Road | SR 644 (Hancock Road) | |
| Augusta | 1.94 | 3.12 | US 340 (Stuarts Draft Highway) | Augusta Farms Road Round Hill Drive | SR 608 (Tinkling Spring Road) | |
| Bath | 1.10 | 1.77 | SR 648 (Lotts Road) | McClures Mill Road | US 220 (Ingalls Boulevard) | |
| Bedford | 0.40 | 0.64 | SR 711 (Bethel Church Road) | Jackson Road | US 460 (Lynchburg Salem Turnpike) | |
| Bland | 0.17 | 0.27 | Dead End | West Camp Drive Pep Street | SR 615 (Railroad Trail) | |
| Botetourt | 1.09 | 1.75 | SR 43 (Narrow Passage Road) | Lake Catherine Drive | Dead End | |
| Brunswick | 0.20 | 0.32 | Dead End | Unnamed road | SR 648 (Great Creek Road) | |
| Buchanan | 2.00 | 3.22 | SR 643 (Hurley Road) | Laurel Fork Road | Dead End | |
| Buckingham | 8.52 | 13.71 | SR 56 (James River Highway) | Mulberry Grove Road Slate River Mill Road | SR 20 (Constitution Route) | Gap between segments ending at different points along SR 602 |
| Campbell | 1.10 | 1.77 | SR 603 (Mud Street) | County Line Road | Appomattox County line | |
| Caroline | 0.55 | 0.89 | SR 600 (Frog Level Road) | Lorne Road | SR 648 (Sunshine Road) | |
| Carroll | 1.40 | 2.25 | SR 654 (Laurel Fork Road) | Vass Mill Road | SR 648 (Excelsior School Road) | |
| Charles City | 0.51 | 0.82 | SR 618 (Adkins Road) | Woodbourne Road | Dead End | |
| Charlotte | 22.50 | 36.21 | SR 619 (Ridgeway Road/Staunton Hill Road) | Coles Ferry Loop Road Coles Ferry Road Fears Town Road Germantown Road Crawley Road | SR 47 (Thomas Jefferson Highway) | Gap between segments ending at different points along SR 47 |
| Chesterfield | 4.67 | 7.52 | SR 651 (Belmont Road) | Newbys Bridge Road | Cul-de-Sac | |
| Clarke | 3.07 | 4.94 | SR 606 (River Road/Feltner Road) | Frogtown Road | SR 606 (Feltner Road/Mount Carmel Road) | |
| Craig | 0.26 | 0.42 | SR 659 | Unnamed road | SR 654 | |
| Culpeper | 3.72 | 5.99 | Dead End | Cedar Mountain Drive | US 15 (James Madison Highway) | |
| Cumberland | 0.35 | 0.56 | SR 45 (Cartersville Road) | Tavern Road High Street | SR 45 (Cartersville Road) | |
| Dickenson | 12.25 | 19.71 | Wise County line | DC Caney Ridge Road Rush Creek Road | SR 83 (Dickenson Highway) | Gap between segments ending at different points along SR 637 |
| Dinwiddie | 0.50 | 0.80 | US 1 (Boydton Plank Road) | Snap Lodge Road | SR 650 (Lew Jones Road) | |
| Essex | 0.10 | 0.16 | SR 684 (Howerton Road) | Unnamed road | SR 604 (Byrds Bridge Road) | |
| Fairfax | 4.21 | 6.78 | SR 236 (Little River Turnpike) | Hummer Road Annandale Road | Falls Church city limits | |
| Fauquier | 2.62 | 4.22 | SR 610 (Midland Road) | Germantown Road | SR 663 (Balls Mill Road) | |
| Floyd | 4.80 | 7.72 | SR 610 (Daniels Run Road) | Conner Road Bear Ridge Road | SR 647 (Deer Run Road) | Gap between segments ending at different points along US 221 |
| Fluvanna | 3.95 | 6.36 | SR 6 (West River Road) | Central Plains Road | US 15 (James Madison Highway) | |
| Franklin | 0.84 | 1.35 | SR 40 (Franklin Street) | School Board Road | SR 40 (Franklin Street) | |
| Frederick | 3.70 | 5.95 | SR 625 (Germany Road) | Springdale Road | US 11 (Valley Pike) | |
| Giles | 6.39 | 10.28 | SR 704 (East River Mountain Road/Lurich Road) | Lurich Road | Narrows town limits | |
| Gloucester | 4.30 | 6.92 | Dead End | Severn Wharf Road Maryus Road | Dead End | Gap between segments ending at different points along SR 653 |
| Goochland | 1.00 | 1.61 | SR 650 (River Road) | Blair Road | SR 6 (Patterson Avenue) | |
| Grayson | 6.05 | 9.74 | SR 805 (Spring Valley Road) | Turkey Knob Road Bain Bridge Road | SR 646 (Taylors Chapel Road) | Gap between segments ending at different points along SR 805 |
| Greene | 0.20 | 0.32 | SR 622 (Celt Road) | Stanard Street Blakely Avenue | US 33 Bus (Main Street) | |
| Greensville | 0.90 | 1.45 | US 58 (Pleasant Shade Drive) | Carter Road | Dead End | |
| Halifax | 5.60 | 9.01 | SR 667 (Leda Road) | Old Concord Road Golden Leaf Road | SR 647 (Tobacco Road) | Gap between segments ending at different points along SR 603 |
| Hanover | 0.50 | 0.80 | US 301/SR 2 (Hanover Courthouse Road) | Hillcrest Road | SR 657 (Peaks Road) | |
| Henry | 0.61 | 0.98 | Dead End | Coleman Drive Paradise Hills Road | Dead End | |
| Highland | 0.50 | 0.80 | Dead End | Unnamed road | US 250 | |
| Isle of Wight | 5.50 | 8.85 | SR 644 (Fire Tower Road) | Peanut Drive Tomlin Hill Drive | SR 637 (Central Hill Road) | |
| James City | 0.74 | 1.19 | Dead End | Bush Springs Road | US 60 (Richmond Road) | |
| King and Queen | 0.70 | 1.13 | SR 625 (Byrds Mill Road) | Kays Lane | Dead End | |
| King George | 0.75 | 1.21 | SR 609 (Comorn Road) | Marmion Lane | Dead End | |
| King William | 0.61 | 0.98 | Dead End | Brandywine Road | US 360 (Richmond Tappahannock Highway) | |
| Lancaster | 0.10 | 0.16 | Dead End | Calvary Lane | SR 1036 (Harris Road) | |
| Lee | 1.07 | 1.72 | Dead End | Park Street Collins Road | Dead End | Gap between segments ending at different points along US 58 |
| Loudoun | 0.40 | 0.64 | SR 621 (Evergreen Mills Road) | Hogeland Mill Road | Dead End | |
| Louisa | 6.58 | 10.59 | SR 640 (Jack Jouett Road) | Byrd Mill Road | SR 613 (Poindexter Road) | |
| Lunenburg | 2.00 | 3.22 | SR 40 | Starlight Lane | Dead End | |
| Madison | 3.10 | 4.99 | End State Maintenance | Quaker Run Road | SR 670 (Old Blue Ridge Turnpike) | |
| Mathews | 0.67 | 1.08 | Dead End | Peary Road | SR 608 (Potato Neck Road) | |
| Mecklenburg | 3.00 | 4.83 | US 1 (Mecklenburg Avenue) | Clover Road | SR 138 | |
| Montgomery | 1.57 | 2.53 | US 460 | Coal Bank Hollow Road | SR 624 (Mount Tabor Road) | |
| Nelson | 1.12 | 1.80 | SR 639 (Craigtown Road) | Lonesome Pine Road | SR 639 (Craigtown Road) | |
| New Kent | 3.05 | 4.91 | US 60 (Pocahontas Trail) | Rockahock Road | US 60 (Pocahontas Trail) | |
| Northampton | 0.40 | 0.64 | SR 641 (Culls Drive) | Raymond Lane | Dead End | |
| Northumberland | 3.50 | 5.63 | Dead End | Flood Point Road Lighthouse View Drive | Dead End | Gap between segments ending at different points along SR 644 |
| Nottoway | 0.70 | 1.13 | Dead End | Elletts Mill Road | SR 650 (Schutt Road) | |
| Orange | 2.18 | 3.51 | US 522 (Zachary Taylor Highway) | Grasty Lane | SR 629 (Lahore Road) | |
| Page | 0.10 | 0.16 | Dead End | Eighth Avenue Extension | Luray town limits | |
| Patrick | 3.96 | 6.37 | SR 663 (Elastic Plant Road) | Gammons Road Cox Ridge Road | SR 103 (Dry Pond Highway) | |
| Pittsylvania | 22.38 | 36.02 | Dead End | Anderson Mill Road Payneton Road Sheva Road Motleys Mill Road | SR 640 (Spring Garden Road) | Gap between segments ending at different points along US 29 Gap between segments ending at different points along SR 57 |
| Powhatan | 0.40 | 0.64 | SR 684 (Cartersville Road) | Garret Road | Dead End | |
| Prince Edward | 2.70 | 4.35 | US 460 (Prince Edward Highway) | Oliver Road | SR 648 (Hardtimes Road) | |
| Prince George | 2.40 | 3.86 | SR 626 (Tavern Road) | Union Branch Road Walton Lake Road | SR 630 (Lamore Drive) | |
| Prince William | 5.13 | 8.26 | SR 653 (Parkgate Drive) | Old Church Road Brentsville Road | SR 234 (Dumfries Road) | Gap between SR 619 and SR 692 |
| Pulaski | 1.18 | 1.90 | SR 674 (Pond Lick Hollow Road) | Thaxton Road | SR 738 (Robinson Tract Road) | |
| Rappahannock | 2.62 | 4.22 | SR 615 (Castleton Ford Road) | Castle Mountain Road | SR 618 (Laurel Mills Road) | |
| Richmond | 0.26 | 0.42 | US 360 (Richmond Road) | Meadowbrook Road | US 360 (Richmond Road) | |
| Roanoke | 2.11 | 3.40 | Dead End | Dry Hollow Road | SR 639 (West River Road) | |
| Rockbridge | 1.10 | 1.77 | SR 646 (Big Hill Road) | Tom Alphin Road | Dead End | |
| Rockingham | 3.33 | 5.36 | SR 754 (Berrytown Road/Rocky Bar Road) | Berrytown Road Island Ford Road Stove Drive | Dead End | |
| Russell | 0.30 | 0.48 | SR 646 (Tunnel Road) | Harris Road | Dead End | |
| Scott | 8.45 | 13.60 | SR 65 (Clinch River Highway) | Rye Cove Memorial Road | SR 65 (Clinch River Highway) | |
| Shenandoah | 1.50 | 2.41 | Dead End | Fishers Road | SR 645 (Woodville Road) | |
| Smyth | 3.52 | 5.66 | SR 606 (Grosses Creek Road) | Unnamed road Need More Road | SR 607 (Flatwood Acres Road) | Gap between segments ending at different points along SR 605 |
| Southampton | 3.81 | 6.13 | SR 611 (Flaggy Run Road) | Country Club Road | SR 641 (Sedley Road) | |
| Spotsylvania | 4.60 | 7.40 | SR 606 (Post Oak Road) | Seays Road Mill Pond Road | SR 612 (Catharpin Road) | Gap between segments ending at different points along SR 608 |
| Stafford | 1.90 | 3.06 | US 17 (Warrenton Road) | Richland Road | SR 612 (Hartwood Road) | |
| Surry | 0.45 | 0.72 | Dead End | River View Drive | SR 31 (Rolfe Highway) | |
| Sussex | 9.40 | 15.13 | SR 681 (Concord Sappony Road) | Unnamed road Henderson Road Woodyard Road | SR 657 (Palestine Road) | |
| Tazewell | 3.75 | 6.04 | SR 651 (T R Barrett Road) | Lynn Hollow Road | US 19/US 460 | |
| Warren | 7.43 | 11.96 | SR 613 (Bentonville Browntown Road)/SR 631 | Browntown Road | US 340 (Stonewall Jackson Highway) | |
| Washington | 1.20 | 1.93 | SR 650 (Old Jonesboro Road) | Junction Drive Highpoint Road | SR 648 (Sinking Creek Road) | Gap between segments ending at different points along SR 647 |
| Westmoreland | 1.53 | 2.46 | Dead End | Deep Point Road Federal Farm Road | Dead End | |
| Wise | 3.97 | 6.39 | SR 72 | Caney Ridge Road | Dickenson County line | |
| Wythe | 3.78 | 6.08 | Wytheville town limits | Atkins Mill Road | Dead End | Gap between FR-42 and FR 43 |
| York | 0.33 | 0.53 | Dead End | Rich Road | SR 680 (Rich Road) | |
