= Virginia State Route 650 =

State highway in Virginia, United States

State Route 650

Route information
- Maintained by VDOT

Location
- Country: United States
- State: Virginia

Highway system
- Virginia Routes; Interstate; US; Primary; Secondary; Byways; History; HOT lanes

State Route 650 (SR 650) in the U.S. state of Virginia is a secondary route designation applied to multiple discontinuous road segments among the many counties. The list below describes the sections in each county that are designated SR 650.

== List ==
County	Length (mi)	Length (km)	From	Via	To	Notes
Accomack	1.38	2.22	SR 648 (Daugherty Road)	Mini Road	SR 126 (Fairgrounds Road)	Gap between segments ending at different points along SR 609
Albemarle	0.11	0.18	SR 631 (Rio Road East)	Gasoline Alley	Dead End	
Alleghany	0.70	1.13	SR 311 (Kanawha Trail)	School House Road	Dead End	
Amelia	1.60	2.57	SR 619 (Bunker Hill Road)	Rock Road	SR 621 (Reed Rock Road)	
Amherst	8.52	13.71	Dead End	Perch Road	SR 130 (Elon Road)	
Appomattox	3.55	5.71	SR 606 (New Chapel Road)	Narrow Passage Road	SR 604 (Promise Land Road)	
Bath	0.36	0.58	Dead End	Lee Roy Road	Dead End	
Bedford	0.18	0.29	SR 755 (Nemmo Road)	Eaffa Lane	SR 755 (Nemmo Road)	
Bland	0.90	1.45	Dead End	Round Bottom Drive	SR 61 (Wolf Creek Highway)	
Botetourt	2.00	3.22	SR 640 (Brughs Mill Road)	Lugar Lane	SR 640 (Brughs Mill Road)	
Brunswick	0.31	0.50	FR 650 (Industrial Park Drive)	Industrial Park Drive	SR 750 (Pineview Road)	
Buchanan	14.14	22.76	SR 700 (Thomas Mountain Road)	Home Creek Road Lesters Fork Road	SR 643 (Hurley Road)	
Buckingham	8.20	13.20	US 15 (James Madison Highway)	Belle Road	Cumberland County line	
Campbell	6.75	10.86	US 501 (Brookneal Highway)	Mollies Creek Road	SR 615 (Red House Road)	
Caroline	2.67	4.30	Dead End	Discovery Lane Winston Loop	SR 30 (Dawn Boulevard)	Gap between segments ending at different points along SR 30
Carroll	1.80	2.90	SR 648 (Windover Road)	Kinzer Road	SR 654 (Laurel Fork Road)	
Charles City	3.20	5.15	SR 106 (Roxbury Road)	Cattail Road	SR 609 (Barnetts Road)	
Charlotte	8.21	13.21	SR 667 (Hillcroft Road)	Hill Cross Road Woodfork Road	SR 47 (Thomas Jefferson Highway)	
Chesterfield	3.51	5.65	SR 651 (Belmont Road)	Turner Road	US 60 (Midlothian Turnpike)	
Clarke	0.60	0.97	SR 601 (Blue Ridge Mountain Road)	Mount Weather Road	SR 601 (Blue Ridge Mountain Road)	
Craig	0.85	1.37	SR 646 (Allen Street)	Marshall Avenue Middle Street	Dead End	
Culpeper	3.25	5.23	Dead End	Obannons Mill Road	Rappahannock County line	
Cumberland	2.13	3.43	Buckingham County line	Belle Road	SR 622 (Trents Mill Road)	
Dickenson	7.87	12.67	Wise County line	Unnamed road	SR 627	
Dinwiddie	12.06	19.41	SR 610 (Old White Oak Road)	Lew Jones Road Hamilton Arms Road Hawkins Church Road	SR 619 (Courthouse Road)	Gap between segments ending at different points along US 1
Essex	3.96	6.37	King and Queen County line	Smithfield School Road Hickory Hill Road	SR 619 (Sunnyside Road)	Gap between segments ending at different points along SR 623
Fairfax	8.16	13.13	SR 236 (Little River Turnpike)	Annandale Road Gallows Road Gallows Branch Road Old Gallows Road Magarity Road	SR 694 (Great Falls Street)	Gap between SR 7078 and SR 7079 Gap between SR 7 and SR 2724
Fauquier	1.20	1.93	SR 28 (Catlett Road)	Messick Road	SR 649 (Germantown Road)	
Floyd	0.50	0.80	SR 730 (Duncans Chapel Road)	Mystic Lane	Dead End	
Fluvanna	4.12	6.63	SR 640 (Shores Road)	Mountain Hill Road	SR 6 (West River Road)	
Franklin	0.60	0.97	Dead End	Shockey Ridge Road	SR 602 (Callaway Road)	
Frederick	0.22	0.35	SR 673 (Golds Hill Road)	Upper Ridge Road	SR 739 (Apple Pie Ridge Road)	
Giles	0.20	0.32	West Virginia state line	Deer Run Road	SR 648 (Elgood Mountain Road)	
Gloucester	2.45	3.94	SR 653 (Kings Creek Road)	Line Fence Road Belvins Creek Road	Dead End	Gap between segments ending at different points along SR 652
Goochland	4.37	7.03	SR 6 (Patterson Avenue)	River Road	Henrico County line	
Grayson	3.75	6.04	Dead End	Springwood Lane Clito Road	SR 805 (Spring Valley Road)	Gap between segments ending at different points along SR 660
Greene	1.70	2.74	Dead End	Mount Olivet Road	SR 615 (Evergreen Church Road)	
Greensville	4.41	7.10	SR 621 (Quarry Road)	Quarry Road Collins Road	SR 627 (Brink Road)	Gap between segments ending at different points along SR 639
Halifax	2.90	4.67	Pittsylvania County line	Mulberry Road	SR 603 (Cody Road)	
Hanover	1.90	3.06	SR 635 (Sandy Valley Road)	Little Florida Road	US 360 (Mechanicsville Turnpike)	
Henry	10.43	16.79	Martinsville city limits	Spruce Street Irisburg Road	SR 610 (Axton Road)	Multiple gaps due to segments ending at several different locations along the Martinsville city limits
Highland	0.15	0.24	Dead End	Unnamed road	SR 640	
Isle of Wight	3.00	4.83	SR 646 (Beale Place Drive)	Whispering Pines Trail	SR 637 (Central Hill Road)	
James City	0.42	0.68	SR 669 (Gilbert Adams Road)	Foley Drive	SR 669 (Gilbert Adams Road)	
King and Queen	1.60	2.57	SR 631 (Smithfield Road)	Smithfield School Road	Essex County line	
King George	1.10	1.77	SR 625 (Salem Church Road)	Welcome Lane	SR 623 (Jersey Road)	
King William	1.07	1.72	SR 30 (King William Road)	Roane Oak Road	Dead End	
Lancaster	2.43	3.91	SR 3 (Mary Ball Road)	Fleets Bay Road	Dead End	
Lee	2.05	3.30	US 58 (Main Street)	Harlan Road Unnamed road	SR 647 (Millers Chapel Road)	
Loudoun	8.50	13.68	SR 734 (Snickersville Road)	Oatlands Road Oatlands Mill Road Gleedsville Road	US 15 (James Monroe Highway)	Gap between segments ending at different points along US 15
Louisa	1.90	3.06	SR 618 (Fredericks Hall Road)	Pottiesville Road	SR 652 (Kentucky Springs Road)	
Lunenburg	1.05	1.69	SR 651 (Redbanks Road)	Seay Way	Dead End	
Madison	3.10	4.99	Dead End	Beamers Head Road Oak Grove Road Berrey Road	SR 672 (Meadows Lane)	Gap between segments ending at different points along SR 642
Mathews	0.80	1.29	SR 660	Hicks Wharf Road	Dead End	
Mecklenburg	1.74	2.80	SR 651 (Plank Road)	Dockery Road	SR 903 (Goodes Ferry Road)	
Middlesex	0.23	0.37	Dead End	Montgomery Cove Road	SR 636 (Timberneck Road)	
Nelson	3.61	5.81	SR 653 (Wilson Road)	Thomas F Ryan Lane Oakridge Road High Peak Lane	Dead End	Gap between segments ending at different points along SR 56
New Kent	0.63	1.01	Dead End	Landing Road	US 60 (Pocahontas Trail)	
Northampton	1.10	1.77	SR 645 (Arlington Road)	Cheapside Road	SR 624 (Capeville Drive)	
Northumberland	1.24	2.00	Dead End	Sweethall Drive Campground Road	Dead End	
Nottoway	4.20	6.76	Dead End	Mallory Hill Road Schutt Road	SR 723 (Lewiston Plank Road)	
Orange	4.09	6.58	Dead End	Independence Road	SR 20 (Constitution Highway)	
Page	6.72	10.81	US 340	Grove Hill River Road River Road	US 340 Bus/SR 636	Formerly SR 158
Patrick	2.92	4.70	North Carolina state line	Big Dan Lake Drive Red Bank School Road	SR 103 (Claudville Highway)	Gap between segments ending at different points along SR 645
Pittsylvania	0.50	0.80	Dead End	Jennings Road	SR 667 (Hermosa Road)	
Powhatan	0.75	1.21	SR 636 (Cook Road)	Nichols Road	Dead End	
Prince Edward	4.10	6.60	SR 626 (Pin Oak Road)	Twenty Two Road	SR 658 (Five Forks Road)	
Prince George	3.50	5.63	SR 623 (Rowanty Road)	Unnamed road	SR 638 (Templeton Road)	
Prince William	0.55	0.89	SR 746 (Smithfield Road)	Doves Lane	Dead End	
Pulaski	1.25	2.01	Dead End	Valley Road	Pulaski town limits	
Rappahannock	0.41	0.66	SR 615 (Turkey Ridge Road)	O'Bannons Mill Road	Dead End at Little Blackwater Creek	
Richmond	0.90	1.45	Dead End	Barnfield Road	SR 619 (Rich Neck Road)	
Roanoke	1.24	2.00	SR 785 (Blacksburg Road)	Gravel Hill Road	SR 624	
Rockbridge	1.70	2.74	Dead End	Unnamed road	Dead End	Gap between segments ending at different points along SR 646
Rockingham	4.78	7.69	SR 655 (Lawyer Road)	Dairy Road Three Springs Road Power Dam Road	SR 649 (Island Ford Road)	Gap between segments ending at different points along SR 652
Russell	1.80	2.90	SR 646 (John Simms Hill Road)	Breezers Branch Road	SR 620 (Finney Road)	
Scott	7.44	11.97	SR 871 (Natural Tunnel State Parkway)	Unnamed road	SR 65 (Clinch River Highway)	
Shenandoah	3.07	4.94	US 11 (Old Valley Pike)	Tea Berry Road	SR 747 (Riverview Drive)	
Smyth	12.40	19.96	SR 16 (Sugar Grove Highway)	Corners Creek Road South Fork Road	SR 660 (Riverside Drive)	
Southampton	5.54	8.92	Dead End	Shady Brook Trail	SR 611 (Flaggy Run Road)	Gap between segments ending at different points along US 58
Spotsylvania	1.30	2.09	SR 733 (Brockenburg Road)	Margo Road	SR 606 (Post Oak Road)	
Stafford	2.79	4.49	SR 651 (Kellogg Mill Road)	Mount Olive Road	SR 616 (Poplar Road)	
Surry	7.35	11.83	Dead End	Mount Ray Drive Hog Island Road	Dead End	
Sussex	1.20	1.93	Dead End	Unnamed road	SR 634 (Old Forty Road)	
Tazewell	12.21	19.65	SR 651 (T R Barrett Road)	Wittens Mill Road Wrights Valley Road Tip Top Road	US 19 (Trail of the Lonesome Pine)	
Warren	0.32	0.51	SR 649 (Browntown Road)	Unnamed road	US 340 (Stonewall Jackson Highway)	
Washington	1.00	1.61	Tennessee state line	Old Jonesboro Road	SR 654 (Hearst Road)	
Westmoreland	2.72	4.38	Dead End	Saint James Lane South Tidwells Road	SR 621 (North Tidwells Road)	
Wise	5.87	9.45	SR 649 (Craney Ridge Road)	Herald Road Sandy Ridge Road	Dickenson County line	
Wythe	1.60	2.57	Dead End	Rudisill Road	SR 684	
York	0.18	0.29	SR 238 (Washington Road)	Lafayette Road	SR 633 (Cornwallis Road)	
