= Virginia State Route 654 =

State highway in Virginia, United States

State Route 654

Route information
- Maintained by VDOT

Location
- Country: United States
- State: Virginia

Highway system
- Virginia Routes; Interstate; US; Primary; Secondary; Byways; History; HOT lanes

State Route 654 (SR 654) in the U.S. state of Virginia is a secondary route designation applied to multiple discontinuous road segments among the many counties. The list below describes the sections in each county that are designated SR 654.

== List ==
County	Length (mi)	Length (km)	From	Via	To	Notes
Accomack	2.00	3.22	Dead End	Acorn Drive Chestnut Stump Road	SR 655 (Plantation Road)	
Albemarle	1.99	3.20	SR 601 (Old Garth Road)	Garth Barracks Road	Charlottesville city limits	
Alleghany	0.38	0.61	US 60 (Midland Trail)	Unnamed road	US 60 (Midland Trail)	
Amelia	0.85	1.37	Dead End	Thompson Lane	SR 307 (Holly Farms Road)	
Amherst	0.40	0.64	SR 613 (Kentmoor Farm Road)	Mundys Mill Road	Dead End	
Appomattox	7.64	12.30	SR 24 (Old Courthouse Road)	Watt Abbitt Road	US 60 (Anderson Highway)	
Augusta	4.72	7.60	US 11 (Greenville Avenue/Lee Jackson Highway)	White Hill Road	US 340 (Stuarts Draft Highway)	
Bath	0.74	1.19	SR 640 (Mill Creek Road)	Unnamed road	Dead End	
Bedford	7.42	11.94	Dead End	Hickory Cove Lane Radford Church Road Feldspar Road Morgans Church Road	SR 122 (Moneta Road)	Gap between segments ending at different points along SR 805
Bland	0.08	0.13	SR 649 (Pep Street/West Camp Drive)	Chase Street	SR 615 (Railroad Trail)	
Botetourt	1.90	3.06	US 220 Alt (Cloverdale Road)	Read Mountain Road	US 11 (Lee Highway)	
Brunswick	1.45	2.33	SR 620 (Old Poole Road)	Turner Store Road	SR 621 (Meherrin River Road)	
Buchanan	2.10	3.38	SR 638 (Dismal River Road)	Spruce Pine Road	Dead End	
Buckingham	2.74	4.41	SR 600 (Plank Road)	Back Mountain Road	SR 632 (Ca Ira Road)	
Campbell	2.50	4.02	US 501 (Brookneal Highway)	Marshall Mill Road	SR 650 (Mollies Creek Road)	
Caroline	12.44	20.02	SR 652 (Ruther Glen Road)	Signboard Road Moores Mill Road Burkes Bridge Road Kidds Fork Road Pendleton Road	SR 721 (Sparta Road)	Gap between segments ending at different points along SR 656 Gap between segments ending at different points along SR 601 Gap between segments ending at different points along SR 643
Carroll	8.77	14.11	SR 677 (Crooked Oak Road)	Laurel Fork Road	SR 664 (Silverleaf Road)	
Charles City	1.00	1.61	SR 618 (Adkins Road)	Deerfield Road	Dead End	
Charlotte	8.13	13.08	SR 59	Eureka School Road Mount Harmony Road Crab Orchard Road	Prince Edward County line	Gap between segments ending at different points along SR 40
Chesterfield	11.84	19.05	SR 602 (River Road)	Bundle Road Spring Run Road Bailey Bridge Road	SR 651 (Claypoint Road)	Gap between segments ending at different points along SR 655
Clarke	1.70	2.74	SR 653 (Kimble Road)	Stringtown Road	SR 611 (Summit Point Road)	
Craig	0.27	0.43	SR 653	Unnamed road	SR 649	
Culpeper	1.00	1.61	Dead End	Wilson Road	SR 617 (Racoon Ford Road)	
Cumberland	13.30	21.40	SR 600 (Stoney Point Road)	Sunnyside Road Frenchs Store Road Pinegrove Road	SR 616 (Deep Run Road)	Gap between segments ending at different points along SR 13
Dickenson	3.57	5.75	SR 643	Unnamed road	SR 643 (Carter Stanley Highway)	
Dinwiddie	3.22	5.18	SR 687 (Cutbank Road)	Rainey Road	SR 40 (McKenney Highway)	
Essex	2.06	3.32	Dead End	Rectory Road Belle Meade Road	Dead End	
Fairfax	6.59	10.61	SR 645 (Clifton Road)	Popes Head Road Zion Drive	SR 651 (Guinea Road)	Gap between segments ending at different points along SR 123
Fauquier	1.90	3.06	Culpeper County line	Strodes Mill Road	SR 655 (Lucky Hill Road)	Gap between segments ending at different points along SR 651
Floyd	3.17	5.10	US 221 (Floyd Highway)	Goldfield Road Kings Store Road	SR 610 (Daniels Run Road)	
Fluvanna	3.94	6.34	SR 655 (West Bottom Road)	Cloverdale Road	SR 656 (Bremo Road)	
Franklin	1.88	3.03	SR 616 (Morewood Road)	Windlass Road	Dead End	
Frederick	13.48	21.69	Dead End	Woodchuck Lane Poorhouse Road Marple Road Cedar Grove Road Frog Hollow Road	West Virginia state line	Gap between segments ending at different points along SR 803 Gap between segments ending at different points along SR 671
Giles	5.40	8.69	Dead End	Springdale Road	SR 622 (Bear Spring Road)	
Gloucester	1.25	2.01	SR 641 (Low Ground Road)	Broad Marsh Lane	Dead End	
Goochland	3.64	5.86	SR 641 (Shallow Well Road/Genito Road)	Shallow Well Road	SR 620 (Hanover Road)	
Grayson	11.80	18.99	US 21 (Elk Creek Parkway)	Peach Bottom Road Hines Branch Road	SR 805 (Spring Valley Road)	Gap between segments ending at different points along SR 660
Greene	0.32	0.51	Dead End	Mays Road	SR 623 (Swift Run Road)	
Greensville	1.74	2.80	Emporia city limits	SunnySide Road	SR 611 (Brick Yard Road)	
Halifax	2.73	4.39	SR 360 (Mountain Road)	Sinai Road	US 501 (Halifax Road)	
Hanover	1.90	3.06	SR 656 (Mount Hermon Road)	Stumpy Road	US 301/SR 2 (Hanover Courthouse Road)	Gap between segments ending at different points along SR 657
Henry	1.10	1.77	SR 657 (Dyers Stone Road)	Ravens Croft Road	Dead End	
Highland	9.06	14.58	US 250 (Highland Turnpike)	Doe Hill Road Johnston Road	West Virginia state line	Formerly SR 269
Isle of Wight	8.50	13.68	SR 602 (Longview Drive)	Quaker Road Carroll Bridge Road	SR 620 (Scotts Factory Road)	Gap between segments ending at different points along SR 600
James City	0.37	0.60	US 60 (Pocahontas Trail)	Jackson Street	SR 692 (Railroad Street)	
King and Queen	1.20	1.93	Dead End	Davis Beech Road	SR 14 (The Trail)	
King George	1.65	2.66	SR 600 (Passapatanzy Drive)	Belvedere Drive	Dead End	
King William	2.30	3.70	Dead End	Pampatike Road	SR 618 (Acquinton Church Road)	
Lancaster	0.90	1.45	SR 637 (James Wharf Road)	Newtown Road	SR 637 (James Wharf Road)	
Lee	5.00	8.05	SR 612 (Lower Waldens Creek Road)	Hurricane Road	SR 662 (Curt Russell Road)	
Louisa	2.70	4.35	SR 608 (Signboard Road)	Bagby Road	SR 618 (Belsches Road)	
Lunenburg	2.90	4.67	SR 635 (Oral Oaks Road)	Beech Forest Road	SR 655 (Plank Road)	
Madison	1.20	1.93	SR 231 (Blue Ridge Turnpike)	Williamsburg Pike	SR 231 (Blue Ridge Turnpike)	
Mathews	0.40	0.64	SR 617 (River Road)	Gum Spring Road	Dead End	
Mecklenburg	3.09	4.97	SR 47	Whittles Mill Road	Dead End	
Middlesex	0.50	0.80	Dead End	Gillam Road	SR 3 (General Puller Highway)	
Montgomery	1.50	2.41	SR 685 (Prices Fork Road)	Brooksfield Road	SR 655 (Long Shop Road/Mount Zion Road)	
Nelson	7.31	11.76	SR 657 (Tye River Road)	Falling Rock Drive Cedar Creek Road	SR 655 (Variety Mills Road)	
New Kent	0.16	0.26	Dead End	Mill Creek Road	SR 33/SR 30 (Eltham Road)	
Northampton	0.62	1.00	SR 183 (Occohannock Neck Road)	Miles Wharf Road	Dead End	
Northumberland	1.33	2.14	Dead End	Fox Point Road	SR 646 (Fairport Road)	
Nottoway	0.76	1.22	Dead End	Micajah Road	SR 49 (The Falls Road)	
Orange	0.90	1.45	SR 231 (Blue Ridge Turnpike)	Perrys Mill Road	SR 231 (Blue Ridge Turnpike)	
Page	8.37	13.47	SR 615	Unnamed road	SR 611	Gap between dead ends Gap between segments ending at different points along SR 675
Patrick	1.80	2.90	Dead End	Russel Creek Lane Concord Church Road	SR 653/SR 841	
Pittsylvania	1.60	2.57	SR 634 (Rockford School Road)	Daltons Farm Lane	SR 930 (Sycamore Road)	
Powhatan	0.50	0.80	SR 603 (Rocky Ford Road)	Fairlane Drive	Dead End	
Prince Edward	4.10	6.60	SR 750 (Beltline Road)	Briery Road Cabbage Patch Road	US 360 (Kings Highway)	
Prince William	0.80	1.29	SR 646 (Aden Road)	Brookfield Road	SR 653 (Parkgate Drive)	
Pulaski	4.91	7.90	FR-44	Old Baltimore Road	SR 658 (Delton Road)	
Rappahannock	0.30	0.48	Dead End	Massies Mountain Road	SR 622 (Harris Hollow Road)	
Richmond	1.30	2.09	Dead End	Dunaway Lane	SR 600 (Ridge Road)	
Roanoke	1.14	1.83	SR 634 (Hardy Road)	Feather Road	SR 24 (Washington Avenue)	
Rockbridge	2.70	4.35	SR 770 (Turnpike Road)	Hayslette Road	SR 770 (Turnpike Road)	
Rockingham	1.61	2.59	SR 842 (Mountain Grove Road)	Montevideo Circle	SR 842/SR 996	
Russell	1.27	2.04	SR 657 (Green Valley Road)	Pittston Road	Lebanon town limits	
Scott	1.97	3.17	US 23	Cliff Mountain Way Unnamed road	SR 71	
Shenandoah	2.90	4.67	US 11/SR 657	Zion Church Road	SR 600 (Zepp Road)	
Smyth	1.00	1.61	SR 604 (Ramblewood Drive)	Red Fox Lane	SR 655 (Sugar Street)	
Southampton	3.61	5.81	SR 609 (Popes Station Road)	Rawling Road Elm Avenue Pine Level Road	SR 652 (Old Belfield Road)	Gap between segments ending at different points along SR 653
Spotsylvania	0.58	0.93	SR 612 (Monrovia Road)	Windway Drive	Dead End	
Stafford	5.67	9.12	SR 655 (Holly Corner Road)	Rocky Run Road Greenbank Road Berea Church Road	SR 652 (Truslow Road)	
Surry	1.20	1.93	SR 613 (Cabin Point Road)	Flying Point Road	Dead End	
Sussex	2.97	4.78	SR 655 (Oakdale Road)	Coppahaunk Road	SR 653 (Bank Street)	
Tazewell	0.95	1.53	Dead End	Snag Hollow Road	SR 655 (Joe Hunt Road)	
Warren	0.17	0.27	SR 622	Maple Street	SR 737	
Washington	1.70	2.74	SR 647 (Old Jonesboro Road)	Hearst Road	SR 666 (Mock Knob Road)	
Westmoreland	0.11	0.18	SR 639 (Winter Harbor Road)	Potomac Mills Road	SR 3 (Kings Highway)	
Wise	4.41	7.10	SR 653	Unnamed road	Dickenson County line	Gap between segments ending at different points along SR 651
Wythe	3.10	4.99	SR 652 (Cinnamon Run Road)	Berea Road	SR 667 (Old Stage Road)	
York	0.33	0.53	SR 746 (Pinehurst Drive)	Walden Drive Cove Crescent Road	Cul-de-Sac	
