= Virginia State Route 642 =

State highway in Virginia, United States

State Route 642

Route information
- Maintained by VDOT

Location
- Country: United States
- State: Virginia

Highway system
- Virginia Routes; Interstate; US; Primary; Secondary; Byways; History; HOT lanes

State Route 642 (SR 642) in the U.S. state of Virginia is a secondary route designation applied to multiple discontinuous road segments among many counties. The list below describes the sections in each county that are designated SR 642.

== List ==
County	Length (mi)	Length (km)	From	Via	To	Notes
Accomack	1.00	1.61	Dead End	Breezy Point Road	SR 638 (Cashville Road)	
Albemarle	0.46	0.74	SR 708 (Red Hill Road)	Red Hill Depot Road	SR 708 (Red Hill Road)	
Alleghany	1.45	2.33	Dead End	Mount Pleasant Drive	SR 687 (Jackson River Road)	
Amelia	7.42	11.94	SR 671 (Jetersville Road)	Amelia Springs Road	SR 616 (Genito Road)	
Amherst	1.95	3.14	SR 635 (Buffalo Springs Turnpike)	Meadow Hollow Loop Meadow Hollow Road	Dead End	
Appomattox	0.70	1.13	Dead End	Country Estates Road	SR 727 (Red House Road)	
Augusta	8.50	13.68	SR 285 (Tinkling Spring Road)	Mule Academy Road Barrenridge Road Cline Lane	Dead End	Gap between segments ending at different points along SR 612
Bath	0.25	0.40	Dead End	Pond Gap Road	US 220 (Ingalls Boulevard)	
Bedford	2.00	3.22	Dead End	Toms Road	SR 43 (Peaks Road)	
Bland	0.70	1.13	US 52 (North Scenic Highway)	Hicksville Road	US 52 (North Scenic Highway)	
Botetourt	3.92	6.31	SR 606 (Blue Ridge Turnpike)	Oak Ridge Road	US 11 (Lee Highway)	
Brunswick	15.03	24.19	US 58 Bus	Poor House Road Zero Road	SR 629 (Rawling Road)	Gap between segments ending at different points along US 1
Buchanan	5.25	8.45	SR 83	Ekins Branch Road	SR 651 (Left Fork Lesters Road)	
Buckingham	3.97	6.39	SR 640 (Andersonville Road)	Perkins Mill Road	SR 24	
Campbell	1.10	1.77	Dead End	Down Creek Road	SR 643 (Lewis Ford Road)	
Caroline	0.30	0.48	SR 716 (Moncure Drive)	Cammack Road	Dead End	
Carroll	1.10	1.77	SR 648 (Willis Gap Road)	Brady Pike	SR 641 (Doe Run Road)	
Charles City	0.73	1.17	Dead End	Stagg Run Road	SR 607 (Wayside Road)	
Charlotte	5.99	9.64	SR 746 (Scuffletown Road)	Mossingford Road	SR 613 (Country Road)	Gap between segments ending at different points along SR 637
Chesterfield	3.35	5.39	Cul-de-Sac	Salem Oaks Drive Salem Church Road	SR 641 (Beulah Road)	
Clarke	1.10	1.77	Frederick County Line	Chrismore Road	SR 644 (Gun Barrell Road)	
Craig	0.64	1.03	Dead End	Stevers Gap Trail	SR 42 (Cumberland Gap Road)	
Culpeper	3.30	5.31	US 15 (James Madison Highway)	Dove Hill Road	SR 645 (Kirtley Trail)	
Cumberland	0.80	1.29	Dead End	Clements Road	SR 600 (Stoney Point Road)	
Dickenson	1.30	2.09	SR 652 (Dr Ralph Stanley Highway)	Unnamed road	Dead End	
Dinwiddie	9.17	14.76	US 460	W Ziles Road Grubby Road Continental Road	SR 644 (Brills Road)	Gap between segments ending at different points along SR 639
Essex	1.26	2.03	SR 620 (Dunbrooke Road)	Purkins Road	Dead End	
Fairfax	3.06	4.92	SR 123 (Ox Road)	Lorton Road	US 1 (Richmond Highway)	Gap between segments ending at different points along SR 611
Fauquier	1.10	1.77	SR 28 (Catlett Road)	Old Calverton Road	Dead End	Gap between segments ending at different points along SR 616
Floyd	5.06	8.14	Dead End	Poff Road Conner Lane Graysville Road Meadow Run Road Locust Grove Road	SR 610 (Daniels Run Road)	
Fluvanna	1.90	3.06	SR 656 (Bremo Road)	Spring Road	SR 655 (West Bottom Road)	
Franklin	4.65	7.48	SR 748 (Five Mile Mountain Road)	Foothills Road	SR 602 (Callaway Road)	
Frederick	6.04	9.72	Clarke County line	Armel Road Tasker Road	SR 37/SR 847	Gap between segments ending at different points along US 522
Giles	0.35	0.56	Dead End	McKensie Avenue Tabernacle Avenue	SR 789 (Scenic Lane)	
Gloucester	1.70	2.74	Dead End	Little England Road	SR 643 (Mark Pine Road)	
Goochland	1.90	3.06	SR 6 (River Road)	Dover Road	SR 641 (Shallow Well Road)	
Grayson	1.00	1.61	SR 641 (Pattons Mill Road)	Loams Road	SR 606 (Windmill Lane/River Cross Lane)	
Greene	4.30	6.92	Dead End at Shenandoah National Park boundary	Taylor Mountain Road Entry Run Road Simms Road	SR 667 (Middle River Road)	Gap between segments ending at different points along SR 637
Greensville	0.40	0.64	Dead End	Dahlia Road	US 301 (Skippers Road)	
Halifax	7.71	12.41	SR 57 (Chatham Road)	Meadville Road Liberty Road	SR 603 (Volens Road)	
Hanover	3.71	5.97	SR 156 (Cold Harbor Road)	Bell Creek Road	SR 710 (Verdi Lane)	
Henry	3.54	5.70	SR 782 (Old Sand Road)	Eggleston Falls Road	SR 636 (Mitchell Road)	
Highland	15.30	24.62	West Virginia state line	Unnamed road Blue Grass Valley Road	US 220 (Potomac River Road)	Gap between segments ending at different points along SR 640
Isle of Wight	0.70	1.13	SR 641 (Bows and Arrows Road)	Pear Tree Road	SR 603 (Blackwater Road)	
James City	0.52	0.84	SR 606	Four Mile Tree Road	Dead End	
King and Queen	0.30	0.48	US 360 (Richmond Highway)	Green Chambers Road	SR 628 (Pattie Swamp Road)	
King George	0.80	1.29	SR 218 (Caledon Road)	Fitzhugh Lane	Dead End	
King William	0.50	0.80	SR 637 (White Oak Landing Road)	White Oak Landing Lane	Dead End	
Lancaster	1.44	2.32	SR 695 (Windmill Point Road)	Little Bay Road	SR 643 (Scott Road)	
Lee	8.88	14.29	Dead End	Fannon Road Old Woodway Road	US 58 Alt	Formerly SR 65
Loudoun	2.40	3.86	Dead End	Hearford Lane Hay Road Jenkins Lane	Dead End	
Louisa	2.40	3.86	SR 632 (Waldrop Church Road)	Bickley Road Old Bickley Town Road	SR 208 (Courthouse Road)	
Lunenburg	1.90	3.06	Dead End	Hazelwood Drive	SR 655 (Plank Road)	
Madison	7.50	12.07	SR 603 (Wippoorwill Road)	Duet Road Poor House Road Lindsey Lane	Dead End	Gap between segments ending at different points along SR 231
Mathews	1.80	2.90	SR 198 (Buckley Hall Road)	Buckley Hall Road Fitchetts Wharf Road	Dead End	
Mecklenburg	2.83	4.55	SR 903 (Goodes Ferry Road)	Rocky Branch Road	SR 618 (Main Street)	
Middlesex	0.02	0.03	US 17 (Tidewater Trail)	Briery Swamp Road	SR 606 (Dragon Road)	
Montgomery	2.92	4.70	US 460	Triangle Street Jennelle Road	SR 603 (Ellett Road)	
Nelson	0.35	0.56	SR 56	Spring Hill Lane	Dead End	
New Kent	1.65	2.66	SR 609 (Old Church Road)	Saint Peters Lane	Dead End	
Northampton	4.51	7.26	SR 600 (Seaside Road)	Seaview Drive Bayville Circle Parsons Circle Old Cape Charles Road Nectarine Street	SR 1106 (Washington Avenue)	Gap between segments ending at different points along SR 684
Northumberland	2.79	4.49	SR 610 (Light STreet)	Knights Run Road	SR 201 (Courthouse Road)	
Nottoway	0.70	1.13	SR 633 (Lone Pine Road)	Lozaretto Creek Road	Dead End	
Orange	0.64	1.03	SR 647 (Old Gordonsville Road)	Hicks Lane Madison Run Court	SR 639 (Madison Run Road)	
Page	1.60	2.57	SR 689 (Antioch Road/Ida Road)	Stonyman Road	US 340 Bus	
Patrick	2.38	3.83	US 58 (Blue Ridge Street)	Sunset Drive Pine Street Poorhouse Creek Road	Dead End	
Pittsylvania	13.98	22.50	SR 670 (Deer View Road)	Unnamed road Scott Jacobs Memorial Drive Shula Drive Marina Drive	Dead End	
Powhatan	1.00	1.61	SR 675 (Page Road)	Boyer Road	Dead End	
Prince Edward	0.69	1.11	SR 643 (Back Hampden Sydney Road)	Germantown Road	SR 628 (Commerce Road)	
Prince George	1.00	1.61	SR 10 (James River Drive)	Beaver Castle Road	SR 706 (Marl Bank Drive)	
Prince William	4.72	7.60	SR 234 (Dumfries Road)	Hoadly Road	SR 294 (Prince William Parkway)/SR 663	
Pulaski	0.45	0.72	SR 676 (Church Street)	Manns Drive	SR 676 (Church Street)	
Rappahannock	4.05	6.52	SR 640 (Forest Grove Road)	Viewtown Road	US 211 (Lee Highway)	
Richmond	6.13	9.87	Dead End	Sharps Road	SR 3 (History Land Highway)	Formerly SR 228
Roanoke	1.10	1.77	US 11 (West Main Street)	Alleghany Drive	SR 640 (Alleghany Drive)	
Rockbridge	0.80	1.29	Dead End	House Mountain Road	SR 641	
Rockingham	3.49	5.62	Dead End	Captain Yancey Road	US 340 (East Side Highway)	
Russell	1.27	2.04	SR 603 (Mountain Road)	Belfast Mills Road	US 19	
Scott	0.40	0.64	SR 627	Unnamed road	SR 644	
Shenandoah	7.30	11.75	Woodstock town limits	Country Brook Road	SR 651 (Mount Olive Road)	Gap between segments ending at different points along SR 655
Smyth	1.15	1.85	US 11 (Lee Highway)	Unnamed road	US 11 (Lee Highway)	
Southampton	1.28	2.06	SR 641/SR 1009	Johnsons Mill Road Maple Avenue Cobb Road	SR 638 (Drake Road)	Gap between segments ending at different points along SR 646
Spotsylvania	0.80	1.29	Dead End	Woolfolk Road	SR 612 (Stubbs Bridge Road)	
Stafford	1.05	1.69	SR 610 (Garrisonville Road)	Barrett Heights Road Evans Road	Dead End	Gap between segments ending at different points along SR 641
Surry	1.13	1.82	Dead End	Cool Spring Road	SR 1206 (Flying Point Bridge Road)	
Sussex	11.53	18.56	US 301 (Blue Star Highway)	Unnamed road Coman Wells Road Unnamed road	SR 40 (Sussex Drive)	Gap between segments ending at different points along SR 735
Tazewell	1.70	2.74	SR 16 (Stoney Ridge Road)	Crocketts Cove Road	SR 16 (Stoney Ridge Road)	
Warren	1.20	1.93	Dead End	Milldale Hollow Road	SR 624 (Milldale Road)	
Washington	0.63	1.01	SR 858 (Hollyfield Road)	Lincoln Circle	SR 858 (Hollyfield Road)	
Westmoreland	4.40	7.08	SR 624/SR 625	Baynesville Road Cloverdale Lane	Dead End	Gap between segments ending at different points along SR 3
Wise	0.37	0.60	Dead End	Unnamed road	SR 640 (Hurricane Road)	
Wythe	8.00	12.87	End of State Maintenance	Mule Hell Road Pope Road	SR 94 (Ivanhoe Road)	Gap between segments ending at different points along SR 619
York	0.97	1.56	SR 677 (Government Road)	Oak Drive Queens Creek Road	Dead End	Gap between segments ending at different points along SR 641
