= Virginia State Route 646 =

Secondary state highway in Virginia, United.States

State Route 646

Route information
- Maintained by VDOT

Location
- Country: United States
- State: Virginia

Highway system
- Virginia Routes; Interstate; US; Primary; Secondary; Byways; History; HOT lanes

State Route 646 (SR 646) in the U.S. state of Virginia is a secondary route designation applied to multiple discontinuous road segments among the many counties. The list below describes the sections in each county that are designated SR 646.

== List ==
County	Length (mi)	Length (km)	From	Via	To	Notes
Accomack	1.40	2.25	SR 647 (Stonehouse Road)	Bellevue Circle	SR 647 (Stonehouse Road)	
Albemarle	1.00	1.61	SR 231 (Gordonsville Road)	Lovers Lane	Orange County line	
Alleghany	0.20	0.32	SR 42/SR 705	Ross Lane	Dead End	
Amelia	2.40	3.86	SR 623 (Chesdin Lake Road)	Cousins Lane	Dead End	
Amherst	0.70	1.13	Dead End	Woodrow Avenue	US 29 Bus	
Appomattox	0.43	0.69	US 460 (Richmond Highway)	Cedar Cove Lane	Dead End	
Augusta	7.76	12.49	SR 42 (Scenic Highway)	Fadley Road	US 11 (Lee Highway)	
Bath	0.30	0.48	US 220	Gibbs Road	SR 618 (Cales Springs Road)	
Bedford	2.10	3.38	US 221 (Forest Road)	Bethany Church Circle Gladden Circle	US 221 (Forest Road)	
Bland	2.68	4.31	SR 615 (Railroad Trail)	Hunting Camp Road	SR 615 (Railroad Trail)	
Botetourt	0.50	0.80	Dead End	Back Creek Lane	SR 640 (Lithia Road)	
Brunswick	4.84	7.79	SR 46 (Christanna Highway)	Prestwood Road	US 1 (Boydton Plank Road)	
Buchanan	5.91	9.51	SR 643 (Hurley Road)	Guesses Fork Road Unnamed road	West Virginia state line	
Buckingham	4.91	7.90	SR 24	Union Church Road Bear Hook Road	SR 607 (Greenway Road)	
Campbell	17.07	27.47	SR 601 (Juniper Cliff Road)	Morris Church Road Spring Mill Road Doss Road	SR 656 (Crews Shop Road)	
Caroline	3.60	5.79	SR 627 (Mattaponi Trail)	Fork Bridge Road	SR 721 (Newtown Road)	
Carroll	0.60	0.97	US 58 (Danville Pike)	Cardinal Circle	US 58 (Danville Pike)	
Charles City	0.20	0.32	SR 612 (Ruthville Road)	Oakwood Road	Dead End	
Charlotte	0.75	1.21	SR 606 (Bacon School Road)	Slaughter House Road	Dead End	
Chesterfield	4.80	7.72	Dead End	Cedar Creek Road Taylor Road	SR 603 (Beaver Bridge Road)	Gap between segments ending at different points along SR 602
Clarke	1.10	1.77	Frederick County line	Nations Spring Road	SR 644 (Gun Barrell Road)	
Craig	0.83	1.34	SR 644 (Cumberland Avenue)	Unnamed road Allen Street	Dead End	
Culpeper	7.15	11.51	US 522 (Sperryville Pike)	Old Stillhouse Road	SR 729 (Eggbornsville Road)	
Cumberland	2.79	4.49	SR 645 (Goshen Road)	Maxeys Mill Road Oak Forest Road	SR 45 (Cartersville Road)	Gap between segments ending at different points along US 60
Dickenson	1.00	1.61	Dead End	Unnamed road	SR 649 (DC Caney Ridge Road)	
Dinwiddie	6.00	9.66	US 1 (Boydton Plank Road)	Glebe Road	SR 613 (Old White Oak Road)	
Essex	1.05	1.69	SR 616 (River Stretch Road/Grandview Drive)	Fort Lowry Lane	Dead End	
Fairfax	0.74	1.19	SR 612 (Henderson Road)	Maple Branch Road	SR 645 (Clifton Road)	
Fauquier	2.10	3.38	SR 602 (Old Mill Road)	Blackwelltown Road	SR 648 (Ebenezer Church Road)	
Floyd	0.40	0.64	Dead End	Holland Road	SR 647 (Deer Run Road)	
Fluvanna	3.74	6.02	Dead End	Hardware Road	SR 6 (West River Road)	
Franklin	11.84	19.05	SR 652 (Circle Creek Road)	Doe Run Road Truevine Road Doe Run Road	SR 674 (Burwell Road)	Gap between segments ending at different points along SR 718
Frederick	0.30	0.48	US 522 (Front Royal Pike)	Reardon Road	Clarke County line	
Giles	0.15	0.24	Dead End	Lawrence Road	SR 647 (Powell Mountain Road)	
Gloucester	2.12	3.41	Dead End	Jenkins Neck Road	SR 649 (Maryus Road)	
Goochland	2.47	3.98	SR 603 (Tabscott Road)	Duval Road	US 250 (Broad Street Road)	
Grayson	2.60	4.18	SR 648 (Providence Road)	Taylors Chapel Road	SR 604 (Rabbit Hollow Road)	
Greene	2.40	3.86	SR 810 (Dyke Road)	Garth Road Blue Run Road	US 33 (Spotswood Trail)	Gap between segments ending at different points along SR 624
Greensville	0.80	1.29	Dead End	Sykes Avenue	SR 730 (Low Ground Road)	
Halifax	2.42	3.89	SR 645 (Acorn Road)	Rabat Road	SR 626 (Shiloh Church Road)	
Hanover	6.26	10.07	SR 641 (Elletts Crossing Road)	Hickory Hill Road	US 301/SR 2 (Hanover Courthouse Road)	
Henry	2.26	3.64	Dead End	Birchwood Road	SR 620 (Old Liberty Road)	
Highland	0.15	0.24	Dead End	Unnamed road	SR 637	
Isle of Wight	11.65	18.75	US 460 (Windsor Boulevard)	Stave Mill Road Garrison Drive Beale Place Drive Rattlesnake Trail	SR 637 (Jones Town Drive)	Gap between segments ending at different points along SR 638 Gap between segments ending at different points along SR 644 Gap between SR 620 and a dead end
James City	1.51	2.43	York County line	Newman Road	SR 606 (Riverview Road)	
King and Queen	0.20	0.32	SR 14 (The Trail)	Curtis Street	SR 678 (Riverview Avenue)	
King George	0.40	0.64	Dead End	Payne Drive	SR 670 (Fifteenth Street)	
King William	0.93	1.50	Dead End	Winchester Road	SR 623 (Union Hope Road)	
Lancaster	5.79	9.32	SR 222 (Weems Road)	Christ Church Road Old Salem Road Ocran Road	Dead End	Gap between segments ending at different points along SR 3
Lee	1.99	3.20	SR 647 (Millers Chapel Road)	Clawson Road	SR 640 (Shavers Ford Road)	Gap between segments ending at different points along SR 641
Loudoun	0.40	0.64	Dead End	Alford Road	SR 659 (Belmont Ridge Road)	
Louisa	6.80	10.94	SR 605 (Shannon Hill Road)	Yanceyville Road	SR 208 (Courthouse Road)	
Lunenburg	4.40	7.08	SR 655 (Plank Road)	Laurel Branch Road	Dead End	
Madison	2.80	4.51	SR 231 (F T Valley Road)	Champe Plain Road	SR 707 (Nethers Road)	
Mathews	0.84	1.35	Dead End	Bar Neck Road	SR 606 (Diggs Wharf Road)	
Mecklenburg	0.05	0.08	Dead End	Sims Bridge Road	SR 618 (Marengo Road)	
Middlesex	0.82	1.32	SR 3 (Greys Point Road)	Long Point Lane	Dead End	
Nelson	5.10	8.21	SR 56	Hunting Lodge Road Beaver Creek Lane	Dead End	Gap between segments ending at different points along SR 645
New Kent	0.73	1.17	SR 636 (Plum Point Road)	Brick House Lane	Dead End	
Northampton	2.80	4.51	Dead End	Picketts Harbor Road Townsend Drive Martins Landing Road	SR 696 (Harmony Road)	Gap between segments ending at different points along SR 645 Gap between segments ending at different points along SR 600
Northumberland	9.38	15.10	SR 640 (Hull Neck Road)	Folly Road Waverly Road Fairport Road	Dead End	Two gaps between segments ending at different points along US 360
Nottoway	2.20	3.54	SR 625 (Courthouse Road)	McCune Road	SR 607 (Bible Road)	
Orange	2.70	4.35	Albemarle County line	Lovers Lane	SR 231 (Blue Ridge Turnpike)	
Page	5.70	9.17	SR 616 (Leaksville Road)	Unnamed road	SR 616 (Leaksville Road)	
Patrick	6.23	10.03	SR 738 (Hookers Creek Road)	Little Dan River Road Browns Dan River Road	SR 645 (Handy Mountain Drive)	
Pittsylvania	2.70	4.35	SR 634 (Blue Ridge Drive)	Spring Road	SR 685 (Telegraph Road)	
Powhatan	1.32	2.12	Dead End	Derwent Road	SR 629 (Trenholm Road)	
Prince Edward	0.90	1.45	US 15 (Farmville Road)	Farmville Lake Road	Dead End	
Prince George	8.89	14.31	SR 630 (Jefferson Park Road)	Middle Road Sandy Ridge Road Halls Farm Road	SR 609 (Old Stage Road)	Gap between segments ending at different points along SR 156
Prince William	11.61	18.68	SR 28 (Nokesville Road)	Aden Road	SR 234 (Dumfries Road)	
Pulaski	0.63	1.01	SR 738 (Robinson Tract Road)	Empire Street	SR 640 (Buena Vista Road)	
Rappahannock	0.80	1.29	Dead End	Dodson Road	SR 642 (Viewtown Road)	
Richmond	1.54	2.48	US 360 (Richmond Road)	Millpond Road	SR 621 (Chestnut Hill Road)	
Roanoke	0.89	1.43	SR 612 (Poor Mountain Road)	Barley Drive	Cul-de-Sac	
Rockbridge	7.84	12.62	SR 770 (Turnpike Road)	Big Hill Road	SR 850 (Midland Trail)	
Rockingham	5.60	9.01	SR 996 (McGaheysville Road)	New Hope Road Bloomer Springs Road	SR 602/SR 644 (Resort Drive)	
Russell	7.92	12.75	SR 645 (New Garden Road)	John Simms Hill Road Tunnel Road	Honaker town limits	Gap between segments ending at different points along SR 620
Scott	4.79	7.71	SR 871 (Natural Tunnel State Parkway)	Unnamed road	SR 652	
Shenandoah	2.95	4.75	SR 623 (Back Road)	Mount Hebron Road	US 11 (Old Valley Pike)	
Smyth	0.90	1.45	SR 638	Dillard Drive	SR 645	
Southampton	8.52	13.71	US 58 Bus	Bride Street Governor Darden Road Rosemont Road	SR 645 (Vicksville Road)	Gap between segments ending at different points along SR 641
Spotsylvania	3.48	5.60	SR 605 (Marye Road)	Stanfield Road	SR 645 (Sunset Road)	
Stafford	1.50	2.41	SR 616 (Poplar Road)	Tacketts Mill Road	SR 612 (Heflin Road)	
Surry	3.94	6.34	SR 10 (Colonial Trail)	Swans Point Road Spring Grove Avenue	SR 613 (Spring Grove Road/Cabin Point Road)	
Sussex	8.29	13.34	Dead End	Unnamed road South Halifax Road Unnamed road Halifax Road Kientz Road Unnamed road South Halifax Road	Dead End	Gap between segments ending at different points along SR 139 Gap between segments ending at different points along SR 645
Tazewell	0.64	1.03	SR 61 (Clearfork Road)	Burton Hollow Road	Dead End	
Warren	0.80	1.29	Dead End	Esteppe Road	SR 660	
Washington	0.36	0.58	SR 91	Wheatland Drive	SR 91	
Westmoreland	1.10	1.77	Richmond County line	Eppings Tract Road	SR 645 (Crookhorn Road)	
Wise	6.77	10.90	Wise town limits	Coeburn Mountain Road	SR 72 (Laurel Avenue)	
Wythe	5.20	8.37	SR 619 (Gleves Road/Saint Peters Road)	Tank Road Davis Cemetery Road Unnamed road Sheffey Town Road	SR 619 (Huddle Road)	Gap between segments ending at different points along SR 690
York	3.05	4.91	US 60 (Richmond Road)	Lightfoot Road Newman Road	James City County line	
