= Virginia State Route 641 =

State highway in Virginia, United States

State Route 641

Route information
- Maintained by VDOT

Location
- Country: United States
- State: Virginia

Highway system
- Virginia Routes; Interstate; US; Primary; Secondary; Byways; History; HOT lanes

State Route 641 (SR 641) in the U.S. state of Virginia is a secondary route designation applied to multiple discontinuous road segments among the many counties. The list below describes the sections in each county that are designated SR 641.

== List ==
County	Length (mi)	Length (km)	From	Via	To	Notes
Accomack	1.80	2.90	Dead End	Broadway Road	SR 638 (Cashville Road)	
Albemarle	11.61	18.68	SR 743 (Advance Mills Road)	Frays Mill Road Burnley Station Road Echo Valley Road	Dead End	Gap between segments ending at different points along SR 20
Alleghany	1.91	3.07	SR 600 (West Morris Hill Road)	Indian Draft Road	SR 687 (Jackson River Road)	
Amelia	2.10	3.38	SR 153 (Military Road)	Earls Road	SR 615 (Namozine Road)	
Amherst	1.10	1.77	SR 643 (Ashebey Woods Road/Cedar Creek Road)	Dancing Creek Road	SR 610 (Pera Road)	
Appomattox	1.99	3.20	Dead End	Dunn Roamin Road Church Street	SR 727 (Church Street/Red House Road)	
Augusta	0.83	1.34	SR 1360 (Westminster Drive)	Fishersville Road Fishville Station Road	Dead End	Gap between a dead end and SR 805
Bath	1.40	2.25	SR 629 (Deerfield Road)	Bright Hollow Road	Dead End	
Bedford	0.90	1.45	Dead End	Karnes Road	SR 43 (Peaks Road)	
Bland	0.15	0.24	SR 606 (Wilderness Road)	Walnut Hollow Drive	Dead End	
Botetourt	14.14	22.76	US 220 (Roanoke Road)	Brughs Mill Road Nace Road Lithia Road	US 11 (Lee Highway)	Gap between segments ending at different points along US 11
Brunswick	3.30	5.31	SR 642 (Poor House Road)	Bright Leaf Road	US 58 (Governor Harrison Parkway)	
Buchanan	5.50	8.85	SR 638 (Dismal River Road)	Patterson Road	SR 640 (Hale Creek Road)	
Buckingham	1.40	2.25	SR 642 (Perkins Mill Road)	Garret Mill Road	SR 638 (Dixie Hill Road)	
Campbell	2.00	3.22	SR 605 (Swinging Bridge Road)	Falcon Road	SR 643 (Lewis Ford Road)	
Caroline	9.15	14.73	SR 721 (Sparta Road)	Perimeter Road	SR 618 (Alps Road)	
Carroll	2.14	3.44	SR 608 (Pilot View Road)	Doe Run Road	SR 648 (Willis Gap Road)	
Charles City	1.50	2.41	Dead End	Little Elam Road	SR 607 (Church Lane)	
Charlotte	3.72	5.99	SR 607 (Roanoke Station Road/River Road)	Mulberry Hill Road	SR 612 (Herman Road)	
Chesterfield	4.49	7.23	SR 611 (Kingsland Road)	Beulah Road Dundas Road	US 1 (Jefferson Davis Highway)	
Clarke	1.30	2.09	US 340 (Lord Fairfax Highway)	Lewisville Road	SR 639 (Allen Road)	
Craig	1.00	1.61	Dead End	Sinking Spring Hollow Road	SR 42 (Cumberland Gap Road)	
Culpeper	3.99	6.42	SR 643 (North Merrimac Road)	Lakemont Drive Mountain Run Lake Road Gibson Mill Road	US 522 (Sperryville Pike)	
Cumberland	1.80	2.90	SR 631 (Davenport Road)	Simms Road	SR 642 (Clements Road)	
Dickenson	0.40	0.64	Dead End	Unnamed road	SR 648	
Dinwiddie	0.55	0.89	US 1 (Boydton Plank Road)	Airport Road	Dead End	
Essex	3.17	5.10	SR 625 (Supply Road)	Quarter Hill Road	US 17 (Tidewater Trail)	
Fairfax	9.29	14.95	SR 612 (Old Yates Ford Road)	Kincheloe Road Chapel Road Pohick Road	SR 790 (Creekside View Lane)	Gap between segments ending at different points along SR 645 Gap between SR 8475 and SR 286
Floyd	3.84	6.18	US 221 (Floyd Highway)	Timberline Road Ponderosa Road	SR 651 (Stuart Road)	
Fluvanna	0.65	1.05	Dead End	Lone Oak Road	SR 650 (Mountain Hill Road)	
Franklin	8.99	14.47	SR 602 (Callaway Road)	Callaway Road	SR 919 (Grassy Hill Road)	
Frederick	5.69	9.16	Warren County line	Refuge Church Road Double Church Road	SR 647 (Aylor Road)	
Giles	5.66	9.11	US 460 (Virginia Avenue)	Clendennin Road	Dead End	
Gloucester	3.63	5.84	SR 1216 (Hayes Road)	Tidemill Road Low Ground Road	SR 656 (Glass Road)	Gap between segments ending at different points along SR 216
Goochland	4.14	6.66	Dead End	Taylor Road Genito Road Shallow Well Road	SR 644 (Miller Lane)	Gap between segments ending at different points along SR 670
Grayson	3.90	6.28	SR 634 (Water Wheel Road)	Pattons Mill Road	Dead End	
Greene	0.50	0.80	Dead End	Davis Road	SR 633 (Amicus Road)	
Greensville	0.35	0.56	Dead End	Garners Mill Road	SR 633 (Pine Log Road)	
Halifax	3.30	5.31	SR 642 (Liberty Road)	Lower Liberty Road	SR 610 (Crystal Hill Road)	
Hanover	2.34	3.77	SR 667 (Blunts Bridge Road)	Cross Corner Road Elletts Crossing Road	Ashland town limits	
Henry	4.07	6.55	SR 687 (Soapstone Road)	Joseph Martin Highway Fisher Farm Road	US 220 Bus	
Highland	0.70	1.13	SR 640 (Blue Grass Valley Road)	Unnamed road	Dead End	
Isle of Wight	13.32	21.44	Suffolk city limits	Harvest Drive Old Carrsville Road Colosse Road Bows and Arrows Road Barrett Town Road	SR 645 (Yellow Hammer Road)	Gap between segments ending at different points along US 58 Bus Gap between segments ending at different points along US 58 Gap between segments ending at different points along SR 603
James City	0.27	0.43	SR 661 (Jackson Drive)	Tyler Drive	SR 669 (Gilbert Adams Road)	
King and Queen	2.00	3.22	SR 652 (Vessels Road)	Salvia Road	SR 625 (Byrds Mill Road)	
King George	0.80	1.29	SR 218 (Caledon Road)	Chatterton Lane	Dead End	
King William	0.70	1.13	SR 30 (King William Road)	Sandy Point Road	Dead End	
Lancaster	2.35	3.78	Dead End	Mosquito Point Road	SR 642 (Little Bay Road)	
Lee	8.36	13.45	SR 783 (Cooney Hollow Road)	Cooney Hollow Road Cox Road Clawson Road Cooney Hollow Road Smyth Chapel Road	Dead End	Gap between segments ending at different points along US 58 Gap between segments ending at different points along SR 644 Gap between segments ending at different points along SR 643 Gap between segments ending at different points along SR 640 Gap between segments ending at different points along US 421
Loudoun	4.03	6.49	SR 2119 (Waxpool Road)	Ashburn Road	Dead End	
Louisa	0.95	1.53	SR 640 (Old Mountain Road)	Captain Meade Road	Dead End	
Lunenburg	2.50	4.02	SR 635 (Oral Oaks Road)	Beaver Creek Road	SR 640 (Bagleys Mill Road)	
Madison	2.51	4.04	SR 609 (Hoover Road)	Weaver Hollow Road	SR 642 (Duet Road)	
Mathews	1.64	2.64	SR 14	Pine Hall Road	Dead End	
Mecklenburg	1.70	2.74	SR 631 (Boxwood Road)	Trinity Church Road	SR 903 (Goodes Ferry Road)	
Middlesex	1.24	2.00	Dead End	Old Courthouse Road	SR 33 (General Puller Highway)/SR 227	Gap between segments ending at different points along SR 629
Montgomery	5.72	9.21	Dead End	Pine Hollow Road Wayside Drive Den Hill Road	SR 603 (North Fork Road)	Gap between segments ending at different points along the Christiansburg town limits Gap between segments ending at different points along US 11/US 460
Nelson	6.69	10.77	US 29 (Thomas Nelson Highway)	Eades Lane	SR 639 (Laurel Road)	
New Kent	0.04	0.06	Dead End	Curtis Road	SR 659 (Parks Road)	
Northampton	2.59	4.17	SR 642 (Old Cape Charles Road/Parsons Circle)	Parsons Circle Bayview Circle Culls Drive	Dead End	
Northumberland	0.70	1.13	Dead End	Lampkintown Road	SR 200 (Jesse DuPont Memorial Highway)	
Nottoway	1.15	1.85	Dead End	Cedar Run Road	US 460 Bus (Cox Road)	
Orange	3.27	5.26	SR 231 (Blue Ridge Turnpike)	Liberty Mills Road Montpelier Road	SR 616 (Montford Road)	
Page	0.80	1.29	SR 640 (Mount Zion Road)	East Branch Road	SR 689 (Ida Road)	
Patrick	1.40	2.25	SR 640 (Central Academy Road)	Green Hill Lane	Dead End	
Pittsylvania	1.00	1.61	SR 642 (Shula Drive)	Delta Drive	SR 638 (Roark Mill Road)	
Powhatan	0.33	0.53	SR 628/SR 711	Robert E Lee Road	SR 711 (Robius Road)	
Prince Edward	1.40	2.25	SR 621 (Grape Lawn Road)	Williams Road	SR 612 (Sandy River Road)	
Prince George	5.80	9.33	SR 106/SR 156	Merchant Hope Road Moody Road	SR 10 (James River Drive)	
Prince William	5.03	8.10	SR 294 (Prince William Parkway)	Old Bridge Road	SR 123 (Gordon Boulevard)	
Pulaski	2.80	4.51	Dead End	Cox Hollow Road	SR 738 (Robinson Tract Road)	
Rappahannock	1.52	2.45	US 522 (Zachary Taylor Avenue)	Alleen Road Fodderstack Road	US 522 (Zachary Taylor Avenue)	
Richmond	1.10	1.77	SR 642 (Sharps Road)	Husseys Creek Road	SR 610 (Ivondale Road)	
Roanoke	1.40	2.25	SR 640 (Alleghany Drive)	Texas Hollow Road	Salem city limits	
Rockbridge	7.40	11.91	SR 676 (Toad Run Road)	Unnamed road	US 60	Gap between segments ending at different points along SR 672
Rockingham	4.19	6.74	SR 843 (Cemetery Road)	Cave Hill Road White Rose Road Waterloo Mill Lane	Dead End	Gap between SR 991 and SR 649
Russell	5.33	8.58	SR 80 (Honnaker Road)	Cedar Cliff Road	SR 637 (Gardner Road)	
Scott	1.00	1.61	SR 601	Unnamed road	Dead End	
Shenandoah	0.90	1.45	US 11 (Old Valley Pike)	Grover Road	SR 757 (Copp Road)	
Smyth	1.10	1.77	SR 642	Unnamed road	SR 644	
Southampton	10.58	17.03	Franklin city limits	Sedley Road Johnsons Mill Road Cottage Hill Road	SR 616 (Ivor Road)	Gap between segments ending at different points along SR 603
Spotsylvania	0.20	0.32	SR 738 (Partlow Road)	Gatewood Road	SR 657 (Edenton Road)	
Stafford	1.20	1.93	Dead End	Onville Road	SR 610 (Garrisonville Road)	
Surry	0.22	0.35	Dead End	Smith Fort Lane	SR 31 (Rolfe Highway)	
Sussex	4.60	7.40	SR 642	Unnamed road	SR 40 (Sussex Drive)	
Tazewell	4.20	6.76	SR 643 (Johnson Branch Road)	Grassy Spur Road	SR 16 (Stoney Ridge Road)	
Warren	0.20	0.32	SR 639 (Refuge Church Road)	Double Church Road	Frederick County line	
Washington	4.50	7.24	Bristol city limits	Campground Road	SR 700 (Rich Valley Road)	
Westmoreland	0.80	1.29	SR 637 (Leedstown Road)	Resolutions Road	SR 640 (Layton Landing Road)	
Wise	6.05	9.74	SR 642	Unnamed road	SR 634 (Bean Gap Road)	
Wythe	1.00	1.61	Dead End	Bishop Road	SR 94 (Ivanhoe Road)	
York	4.51	7.26	Williamsburg city limits	Penniman Road	Dead End	Gap between segments ending at different points along Virginia State Route 199
