= Virginia State Route 607 =

State highway in Virginia, United States

State Route 607

Route information
- Maintained by VDOT

Location
- Country: United States
- State: Virginia

Highway system
- Virginia Routes; Interstate; US; Primary; Secondary; Byways; History; HOT lanes

State Route 607 (SR 607) in the U.S. state of Virginia is a secondary route designation applied to multiple discontinuous road segments among the many counties. The list below describes the sections in each county that are designated SR 607.

== List ==
County	Length (mi)	Length (km)	From	Via	To	Notes
Accomack	2.68	4.31	SR 609 (Big Pine Road)	Coal Kiln Road	SR 600 (Seaside Road)	
Albemarle	0.10	0.16	SR 715 (Esmont Road)	Red Row Lane	Dead End	
Alleghany	7.20	11.59	SR 18 (Potts Creek Road)	Unnamed road	SR 616	
Amelia	4.10	6.60	SR 615 (Namozine Road)	West Creek Road	SR 614 (Dennisville Road)	
Amherst	9.47	15.24	SR 610 (Pera Road)	Beverly Town Road	Rockbridge County Line	
Appomattox	2.10	3.38	Campbell County Line	Columbus Road	SR 670 (Arrowhead Road)	
Augusta	4.63	7.45	SR 731 (Natural Chimneys Road)	Moscow Loop Mount Solon Road	SR 613 (Spring Hill Road)	
Bath	4.00	6.44	SR 687 (Jackson River Turnpike)	Stuart Draft Highway	SR 603 (Richardson Gorge)	
Bedford	6.17	9.93	Botetourt County Line	Porters Mountain Road Mountain View Church Road Montvale Street	SR 695 (Goose Creek Valley Road)	
Bland	2.69	4.33	SR 608 (Price Ridge Road)	Burtons Pond Road	SR 606 (Wilderness Road)	
Botetourt	2.89	4.65	US 221 and US 460	Webster Heights Road Archway Road	Bedford County Line	Gap between segments ending at different points along SR 738
Brunswick	9.75	15.69	SR 712 (Old Stage Road)	Indian Creek Road Five Forks Road	Greensville County Line	Gap between segments ending at different points along SR 608
Buchanan	0.90	1.45	SR 600 (Hurricane)	Fletchers Highway	Dead End	
Buckingham	9.25	14.89	US 60 (James Anderson Highway)	Old Thirteen Road Greenway Road	US 60 (James Anderson Highway)	
Campbell	4.40	7.08	SR 701 (East Ferry Road)	Elliott Road Winfall Road	SR 615 (Red House Road)	
Caroline	4.95	7.97	Spotsylvania County Line	Guinea Station Road Villeboro Road	SR 2 (Fredericksburg Turnpike)	Gap between segments ending at different points along SR 609
Carroll	6.57	10.57	Grayson County Line	Fries Road Iron Ridge Road Mallard Drive	Dead End	Gap between segments ending at different points along SR 635
Charles City	7.15	11.51	SR 5 (John Tyler Memorial Highway)	Wayside Road Church Lane	SR 618 (Adkins Road)	Gap between segments ending at different points along SR 609
Charlotte	14.96	24.08	SR 746 (Scuffletown Road)	River Road Roanoke Station Road Jackson Vaughan Road Moody Creek Road West Spring Hill Road	Mecklenburg County Line	
Chesterfield	1.20	1.93	US 60 (Midlothian Turnpike)	Huguenot Springs Road	Powhatan County Line	
Clarke	0.70	1.13	SR 604 (Ebenezer Road)	Saw Mill Hill Road	SR 606 (River Road)	
Craig	0.30	0.48	Dead End	Old Mountain Road	SR 18	
Culpeper	1.90	3.06	Madison County Line	Cabin Road	SR 644 (Reva Road)	
Cumberland	1.40	2.25	SR 45 (Cartersville Road)	Jennings Road	SR 616 (Deep Run Road)	
Dickenson	18.81	30.27	SR 83	Main Street The Lake Road Lick Creek Road	Buchanan County Line	Gap between segments ending at dead ends Gap between a dead end and SR 83 Gap between segments ending at different points along SR 80
Dinwiddie	1.50	2.41	SR 604 (Halifax Road)	Butler Branch Road	Prince George County Line	
Essex	8.66	13.94	King and Queen County Line	Jones Bridge Road Cheaneys Bridge Road Upright Road Muddy Gut Road	Dead End	Gap between segments ending at different points along SR 612 Gap between segments ending at different points along SR 684 Gap between segments ending at different points along US 17
Fairfax	0.89	1.43	US 50 (Lee Jackson Memorial Highway)	Stonecroft Boulevard	Dead End	
Fauquier	6.88	11.07	SR 806 (Elk Run Road)	Shenandoah Path Carriage Ford Road	Dead End	Gap between segments ending at different points along SR 806
Floyd	0.50	0.80	SR 680 (Starbuck Road)	Greer Road	Dead End	
Fluvanna	1.40	2.25	Louisa County Line	Bybee Road	Louisa County Line	
Franklin	12.10	19.47	Henry County Line	Fairfield Road Providence Church Road Waidsboro Road	SR 40 (Franklin Street)	Gap between segments ending at different points along SR 605
Frederick	0.78	1.26	Dead End	Heishman Lane	SR 600 (Back Mountain Road)	
Giles	0.80	1.29	Dead End	Cave Hill Road	SR 700 (Mountain Lake Road)	
Gloucester	3.30	5.31	SR 610 (Woods Cross Road)	Fletcher Road	SR 606 (Farys Mill Road	
Goochland	3.55	5.71	Dead End	Irwin Road Jackson Shop Road	US 522 (Sandy Hook Road)	
Grayson	8.10	13.04	SR 613 (Edmonds Road)	Meadow Creek Road Kenbrook Drive Fries Road	Carroll County Line	Gap between US 58 and a dead island Gap between segments ending at the Galax City Limits
Greene	3.53	5.68	SR 644	Cedar Grove Road Matthew Mill Road Carpenters Mill Road	Orange County Line	Gap between segments ending at different points along SR 616
Greensville	6.60	10.62	Brunswick County Line	Westward Road Brunswick Road Unnamed road	US 58 (Pleasant Shade Drive)	Gap between US 58 and SR 606
Halifax	4.96	7.98	US 360 (James D Hagood Highway)	Rodgers Chapel Road	SR 746 (Clays Mill School Road)	
Hanover	3.20	5.15	SR 620 (Dogwood Trail Road)	Bienvenue Road	SR 676 (Vontay Road)	
Henry	0.27	0.43	SR 674 (Oak Level Road)	Woodlake Road	Franklin County Line	
Highland	11.17	17.98	US 220	Unnamed road	US 220	
Isle of Wight	1.00	1.61	Suffolk City Limits	Old Mill Road	SR 636 (Old Suffolk Road)	
James City	5.48	8.82	US 60 (Richmond Road)	Croaker Road Sycamore Landing Road	Dead End	Former SR 188 Gap between segments ending at different points along SR 30 Gap between segments ending at different points along SR 606
King and Queen	2.50	4.02	SR 631 (Poor House Lane)	Crouches Road Princess Road	Essex County Line	Gap between segments ending at different points along SR 617
King George	6.69	10.77	US 301/SR 625	Port Conway Road	SR 3 (Kings Highway)	
King William	2.21	3.56	SR 30 (King William Road)	Beadles Road Millwood Road	SR 600 (River Road)	Gap between segments ending at different points along SR 608
Lancaster	2.07	3.33	SR 1048 (Campbell Road)	Goodluck Road Ditchley Road	Northumberland County Line	Gap between segments ending at different points along SR 200
Lee	1.39	2.24	SR 600 (Flower Gap Road)	Hurd Hollow Road	Dead End	
Loudoun	4.17	6.71	Evergreen Ridge Road	Loudoun County Parkway Presidential Drive	SR 1050 (George Washington Boulevard)	Gap between SR 2298/SR 2519 and SR 625
Louisa	4.10	6.60	US 250 (Three Notch Road)	Bybee Road Rock Quarry Road	SR 613 (Poindexter Road)	
Lunenburg	3.60	5.79	SR 609 (Afton Grove Road)	Pleasant Hill Lane	Kenbridge Town Limits	
Madison	18.37	29.56	SR 231 (Blue Ridge Turnpike)	Repton Mill Road Elly Road Lillards Ford Road Ridgeview Road	SR 606 (Novum Road)	Gap between segments ending at different points along SR 230 Gap between segments ending at different points along SR 634 Gap between segments ending at different points along US 29
Mathews	1.90	3.06	Dead End	Gully Branch Road	SR 608 (Hamburg Road/Potato Neck Road)	
Mecklenburg	0.70	1.13	Charlotte County Line	Woodland Road	SR 603 (Estes Road)	
Middlesex	1.53	2.46	SR 602 (Wares Bridge Road)	Dragon Run	SR 606 (Dragon Road)	
Montgomery	1.00	1.61	SR 637 (Jewell Drive)	Miles Road	Dead End	
Nelson	0.90	1.45	SR 626 (Norwood Road)	Greenway Lane	Dead End	
New Kent	1.85	2.98	SR 619 (Hopewell Road)	Steel Trap Road	Dead End	
Northampton	3.80	6.12	Dead End	Stewarts Wharf Road TB Road	SR 618 (Bayside Road)	Gap between segments ending at different points along SR 606
Northumberland	2.26	3.64	Lancaster County Line	Ditchley Road	Dead End	Gap between segments ending at different points along SR 669
Nottoway	13.89	22.35	SR 606 (Lee Lake Road)	Cottage Road Bible Road Jennings Town Road Rocky Ford Road	SR 630 (Melody Lane)	Gap between segments ending at different points along US 460
Orange	0.89	1.43	Greene County Line	Carpenters Mill Road	US 33 (Spotswood Trail)	
Page	2.60	4.18	SR 759 (Jollett Road)	Weaver Road	Shenandoah National Park	
Patrick	0.34	0.55	SR 614 (Squirrel Spur Road)	Mayberry Creek Road	SR 602 (Mayberry Church Road)	
Pittsylvania	3.19	5.13	SR 628 (Harmony Road)	Robertson Road	Dead End	
Powhatan	2.80	4.51	Chesterfield County Line	Huguenot Springs Road	SR 711 (Huguenot Trail/Robius Road)	
Prince Edward	3.50	5.63	US 360	Orchard Road Orchard Street	US 460 (Prince Edward Highway)	Gap between segments ending at different points along SR 621
Prince George	2.70	4.35	Dinwiddie County Line	Butter Branch Road Sunny Brook Road	SR 608 (Garys Church Road)	
Prince William	2.80	4.51	Fauquier County Line	Carriage Ford Road	SR 646 (Aden Road)	
Pulaski	2.57	4.14	Wythe County Line	Little Reed Island Road Boone Furnace Road	SR 693 (Julia Simpkins Road)	
Rappahannock	4.20	6.76	SR 707 (Slate Mills Road)	Quaintance Road	SR 618 (Hawlin Road)	
Richmond	6.30	10.14	Dead End	Union Mill Road Canal Road	US 360 (Richmond Road)	Gap between SR 602 and SR 692
Roanoke	4.23	6.81	SR 669 (Patterson Drive)	Bottom Creek Road	SR 711 (Tinsley Lane)	
Rockbridge	4.62	7.44	Buena Vista City Limits	Robinson Gap Road	Amherst County Line	
Rockingham	4.30	6.92	Dead End	Bear Lithia Road Red Brush Road	Page County Line	
Russell	3.50	5.63	Scott County Line	Buffalo Hollow Road	SR 611 (Burtons Ford Road)	
Scott	0.90	1.45	SR 608	Chestnut Ridge Road	Russell County Line	
Shenandoah	0.40	0.64	SR 681 (Osceola Road)	Riffey Lane	Dead End	
Smyth	1.65	2.66	Washington County Line	Need More Road Flatwood Acres Road	SR 762 (White Top Road)	
Southampton	6.00	9.66	Sussex County Line	Farmers Bridge Road Urquhard Quarter Horse Pen Road Unnamed road	SR 633 (Saint Luke Road)	Gap between segments ending at different points along SR 35 Gap between segments ending at different points along SR 606 Gap between segments ending at different points along SR 628
Spotsylvania	3.50	5.63	US 1 (Jefferson Davis Highway)	Guinea Station Road	Caroline County Line	
Stafford	5.62	9.04	US 1 (Jefferson Davis Highway)	Cambridge Street King Street River Road Naomi Road Cool Spring Road Deacon Road	SR 608 (Brooke Road)	Two gaps between segments ending at different points along SR 3 Bus
Surry	5.73	9.22	SR 601 (Huntington Road)	Huntington Road	SR 611 (Salisbury Road)	
Sussex	3.40	5.47	Southampton County Line	Sandy Hill Road	SR 631 (Gary Road)	
Tazewell	2.23	3.59	SR 601 (Freestone Valley Road)	Little Tumbling Creek Road	SR 91 (Veterans Road)	
Warren	1.60	2.57	US 340 (Stonewall Jackson Highway)	Rocky Lane	SR 649 (Browntown Road)	
Washington	1.17	1.88	SR 762 (Loves Mill)	Golden Glow Drive Flatwood Acres Road	Smyth County Line	
Westmoreland	1.40	2.25	SR 608 (White Point Road/Kinsale Road)	Kinsale Bridge Road	SR 604 (Sandy Point Road)	
Wise	0.15	0.24	SR 688	Unnamed road	SR 706 (Tacoma Mountain Road)	
Wythe	7.11	11.44	US 52 (Fort Chiswell Road)	Castleton Road Unnamed road	Pulaski County Line	
York	0.18	0.29	SR 641 (Penniman Road)	Harrop Lane	Dead End	
