= Virginia State Route 603 =

State highway in Virginia, United States

State Route 603

Route information
- Maintained by VDOT

Location
- Country: United States
- State: Virginia

Highway system
- Virginia Routes; Interstate; US; Primary; Secondary; Byways; History; HOT lanes

State Route 603 (SR 603) in the U.S. state of Virginia is a secondary route designation applied to multiple discontinuous road segments among the many counties. The list below describes the sections in each county that are designated SR 603.

== List ==
County	Length (mi)	Length (km)	From	Via	To	Notes
Accomack	4.50	7.24	Dead End	Bells Neck Road Savagetown Road	US 13 (Lankford Highway)	Gap between segments ending at different points on SR 600
Albemarle	0.70	1.13	SR 663 (Simmons Gap Road)	Plunkett Road	Greene County Line	
Alleghany	6.11	9.83	SR 311 (Kanawah Trail)	Cove Creek Road	SR 602 (Big Ridge Road)	Gap between segments ending at different points on the West Virginia State Line
Amelia	7.30	11.75	SR 640 (Buckskin Creek Trail)	Poor House Road	Dead End	
Amherst	0.50	0.80	US 60 (Richmond Highway)	Rocky Creek Lane	Dead End	
Appomattox	0.90	1.45	Campbell County Line	Dark Leaf Road	SR 604 (Promise Land Road)	
Augusta	3.70	5.95	SR 601 (Estaline Valley Road)	Pond Gap Lane Unnamed road Cales Springs Road	SR 252 (Middlebrook Road)	Gap between segments ending at dead ends
Bath	7.95	12.79	SR 600	Richardson Gorge	SR 687 (Jackson River Turnpike)	
Bedford	1.70	2.74	SR 635 (Jeters Chapel Road)	Mountain Top Lane	Botetourt County Line	
Bland	1.60	2.57	Wythe County Line	Smith Hollow Road	SR 601	
Botetourt	1.80	2.90	Bedford County Line	Zimmerman Road	SR 607 (Archway Road)	
Brunswick	4.10	6.60	SR 611 (Dry Bread Road)	Halifax Road	Greensville County Line	
Buchanan	3.10	4.99	Dead End	Unnamed road	Dead End	Gap between segments ending at different points along SR 657
Buckingham	0.65	1.05	Dead End	Morris Retreat Road	SR 636 (Francisco Road)	
Campbell	3.00	4.83	SR 646 (Spring Mill Road)	Mud Street	Appomattox County Line	
Caroline	10.66	17.16	Hanover County Line	Landora Bridge Road County Line Church Road Church Road Arcadia Road	Spotsylvania County Line	Gap between segments ending at different points along SR 639
Carroll	0.74	1.19	Dead End	Woodfield Lane	SR 654 (Laurel Fork Road)	
Charles City	4.10	6.60	SR 609 (Barnetts Road)	Old Union Road	SR 600 (Charles City Road)	
Charlotte	2.60	4.18	SR 607 (Moody Creek Road)	Lindward Road	Mecklenburg County Line	
Chesterfield	8.50	13.68	Powhatan County Line	Skinquarter Road Beaver Bridge Road	SR 621 (Winterpock Road)	
Clarke	3.37	5.42	SR 612 (Shepherds Mill Road)	Castleman Road	SR 7 (Harry Flood Byrd Highway)	
Craig	1.90	3.06	SR 311	Unnamed road	Dead End	
Culpeper	3.40	5.47	US 29 (James Monroe Highway)	White Shop Road	SR 692 (Old Orange Road)	
Cumberland	0.80	1.29	SR 602 (Ampt Hill Road)	Island Road	Goochland County Line	
Dickenson	1.30	2.09	SR 80 (Helen Henderson Highway)	Unnamed road	Buchanan County Line	
Dinwiddie	1.68	2.70	SR 672 (Church Road)	Weakley Road Sterling Road	SR 226 (Cox Road)	Gap between SR 142 and US 1/US 460
Essex	0.82	1.32	SR 602 (Ashdale Road)	Monte Verde Road	SR 684 (Bowlers Road)	
Fairfax	7.56	12.17	Loudoun County Line	Brockman Lane Beach Mill Road River Bend Road	SR 193 (Georgetown Pike)	
Fauquier	7.71	12.41	SR 28	Bastable Mill Road Greenwich Road	Prince William County Line	Gap between segments ending at different points along SR 667
Floyd	6.10	9.82	Dead End	McAlexander Road Shelor Road Fork Mountain Road Mabry Mill Road	Patrick County Line	Gap between segments ending at different points along SR 632 Gap between segments ending at different points along SR 600
Fluvanna	1.50	2.41	Goochland County Line	Tabscott Road	SR 601 (Venable Road)	
Franklin	2.41	3.88	Henry County Line	Philpott Road	SR 798 (Knob Church Road)	
Frederick	1.70	2.74	SR 604 (Gravel Springs Road)	Brill Road	SR 55 (Wardensville Pike)	
Giles	1.70	2.74	SR 604 (Zells Mill Road)	Lucas Road	SR 602 (Rocky Sink Road)	
Gloucester	3.80	6.12	SR 605 (Indian Road)	Figg Shop Road	SR 198 (Dutton Road)	
Goochland	13.30	21.40	Cumberland County Line	Elk Island Road Tabscott Road	Fluvanna County Line	Gap between segments ending at different points along SR 667 Gap between segments ending at different points along SR 610 See also Elk Island (Goochland County, Virginia)
Grayson	14.12	22.72	Smyth County Line	Fairwood Road Fairwood Drive Ripshin Road Lostlake Road	SR 675 (Glen Wood Road)	Gap between segments ending at different points along SR 16 Gap between segments ending at different points along SR 601
Greene	2.70	4.35	Albemarle County Line	Bingham Mountain Road	SR 633 (Amicus Road)	
Greensville	7.59	12.21	North Carolina State Line	Unnamed road Gaston Road Macedonia Road	Brunswick County Line	Gap between segments ending at different points along SR 633 Gap between segments ending at different points along SR 627
Halifax	22.48	36.18	SR 40 (Stage Coach Road)	Cody Road Volens Road Lenning Road Hunting Creek Road	SR 746 (Mount Laurel Road)	Gap between segments ending at different points along US 501 Formerly SR 126
Hanover	1.77	2.85	SR 684 (Verdon Road)	Landoro Bridge Road	Caroline County Line	
Henry	1.64	2.64	SR 674 (Philpott Drive)	Cedar Hill Drive	Franklin County Line	
Highland	0.60	0.97	SR 600 (Lower Back Creek Road)	Unnamed Road	SR 604	
Isle of Wight	13.27	21.36	Southampton County Line	Blackwater Road Bank Street Church Street Shiloh Drive Everets Road	Suffolk City Limits	Gap between segments ending at different points along SR 606
James City	4.47	7.19	SR 610 (Forge Road)	Diascund Reservoir Road	New Kent County Line	Gap between segments ending at different points along US 60
King and Queen	5.25	8.45	SR 14 (The Trail)	Lombardy Road Dragon Bridge Road	Middlesex County Line	
King George	4.84	7.79	SR 3 (Kings Highway)	Fletchers Chapel Road Dogwood Lane	Dead End	Gap between segments ending at different points along SR 218
King William	1.25	2.01	SR 600 (River Road)	Dover Lane	Dead End	
Lancaster	1.24	2.00	SR 732 (Chestnut Grove Road)	Chestnut Grove Road Chestnut Grove Lane	SR 615 (Beanes Road)	Gap between segments ending at different points along the Northumberland County Line
Lee	5.72	9.21	SR 70	Back Valley Road Carter Cave Road	Scott County Line	Gap between segments ending at different points along SR 604
Loudoun	0.29	0.47	Fairfax County Line	Brockman Lane	Dead End	
Louisa	1.00	1.61	Dead End	Bowlers Mill Road	US 15 (James Madison Highway)	
Lunenburg	7.70	12.39	SR 602/SR 618	Hawthorne Drive Mill Pond Road Cedar Creek Road	SR 645 (Jonesboro Road)	Gap between segments ending at different points along SR 617 Gap between segments ending at different points along SR 137 Gap between segments ending at different points along SR 616
Madison	10.34	16.64	US 29 (Seminole Trail)	Hebron Valley Road Duet Road Whippoorwill Road Hughes River Road Unnamed road	Rappahannock County Line	Gap between segments ending at different points along SR 609 Gap between segments ending at different points along SR 642
Mathews	1.41	2.27	Dead End	Belleview Road	SR 14 (John Clayton Memorial Highway)	
Mecklenburg	2.30	3.70	Charlotte County Line	Estes Road	SR 47	
Middlesex	5.60	9.01	King and Queen County Line	Farley Park Road Warner Road	SR 602 (Old Virginia Street)	
Montgomery	15.44	24.85	Blacksburg Town Limits	North Fork Road Den Hill Road North Fork Road Cove Hollow Road	Dead End	Gap between segments ending at different points along SR 642 Gap between segments ending at different points along SR 723 Gap between SR 603 and SR 641 Gap between segments ending at different points along SR 821 Gap between segments ending at different points along US 11/US 460
Nelson	0.78	1.26	Rockbridge County Line	Irish Creek Road	SR 56	
New Kent	4.24	6.82	James City County Line	Diascund Reservoir Road Good Hope Road	SR 627 (Waterside Drive)	Gap between SR 671 and SR 620
Northampton	2.41	3.88	Dead End	Willis Wharf Road	US 13 Bus	
Northumberland	3.92	6.31	Lancaster County Line	Georgetown Road Mallard Bay Drive	Road	
Nottoway	4.00	6.44	SR 626 (Hungarytown Road)	The Grove Road	US 460 Bus (Old Nottoway Road)	
Orange	6.40	10.30	SR 611 (Zoar Road)	Indian Town Road	SR 601 (Flat Run Road)	
Page	4.61	7.42	Rockingham County Line	Fleeburg Road Unnamed road	SR 650 (River Road)	Gap between segments ending at different points along SR 602
Patrick	0.78	1.26	Dead End	McPeak Lane Turnip Patch Drive	Dead End	Gap between segments ending at different points along SR 600
Pittsylvania	7.00	11.27	SR 40 (Gretna Road)	Allan Creek Road Wyatts Road	SR 761 (Straightstone Road)	Gap between segments ending at different points along SR 668
Powhatan	12.77	20.55	Chesterfield County Line	Petersburg Road Rocky Ford Road Academy Road	SR 615 (Three Bridge Lane)	Gap between segments ending at different points along SR 604 Gap between SR 13 and US 60
Prince Edward	0.10	0.16	US 460 (Prince Edward Highway)	Bradshaw Road	Dead End	
Prince George	1.29	2.08	Petersburg City Limits	Baxter Road	SR 106 (Courthouse Road)	
Prince William	0.83	1.34	Fauquier County Line	Greenwich Road	SR 215 (Vint Hill Road)	
Pulaski	1.89	3.04	Cul-de-Sac	Lake Ridge Drive Shiloh Loop	SR 672 (Lowmans Ferry Road)	
Rappahannock	1.30	2.09	Madison County Line	Pophams Ford Road	SR 707 (Slate Mills Road)	
Richmond	3.00	4.83	SR 601 (Maon Road)	Quinton Oak Lane	SR 612 (Oakland Road)	
Roanoke	0.94	1.51	US 460 (Challenger Avenue)	Bonsack Road	US 460 (Challenger Avenue)	
Rockbridge	13.85	22.29	SR 608	Irish Creek Road	Nelson County Line	
Rockingham	1.60	2.57	SR 607 (Red Brush Road)	Blose Road	SR 609 (Naked Creek Road)	
Russell	11.98	19.28	SR 80 (Hayters Gap Road)	Mountain Road	Tazewell County Line	
Scott	7.11	11.44	Lee County Line	Canton Road	SR 604 (Pattonsville Road)	
Shenandoah	1.10	1.77	SR 713 (Sugar Hill Road)	Van Buren Road	SR 600 (Zepp Road)	
Smyth	6.40	10.30	Washington County Line	Konnarock Road Laurel Valley Road	Grayson County Line	Gap between segments ending at different points along SR 600
Southampton	9.67	15.56	SR 616 (Ivor Road)	Unity Road Backwater Road	Isle of Wight County Line	Gap between segments ending at different points along SR 635
Spotsylvania	1.59	2.56	Caroline County Line	Arcadia Road	US 1 (Jefferson Davis Highway)	
Stafford	6.03	9.70	SR 3 (Kings Highway)	Caisson Road Newton Road Salvington Road	Dead End	Gap between segments ending at different points along SR 604
Surry	2.50	4.02	Sussex County Line	Three Bridges Road	SR 615 (Carsley Road)	
Sussex	6.33	10.19	SR 628 (Main Street)	Church Street Unnamed road	Surry County Line	
Tazewell	4.00	6.44	Russell County Line	College Estates Road Midway Road	SR 609 (Wardell Road)	
Warren	5.20	8.37	SR 647 (Dismal Hollow Road)	Oregon Hollow Road Howellsville Road	SR 638 (Blue Mountain Road)	Gap between segments ending at different points along SR 643
Washington	1.16	1.87	US 58 (Jeb Stuart Highway)	Konnarock Road	Smyth County Line	
Westmoreland	1.00	1.61	Dead End	Mulberry Lane	SR 203 (Oldhams Road)	
Wise	6.78	10.91	US BUS 23	Dunbar Road	Dead End	Formerly SR 69
Wythe	6.62	10.65	Wytheville Town Limits	Cove Road Smith Hollow Road	Bland County Line	
York	4.81	7.74	SR 713 (Walker Mill Road)	Mooretown Road	SR 199	
