= Virginia State Route 606 =

State highway in Virginia, United States

State Route 606

Route information
- Maintained by VDOT

Location
- Country: United States
- State: Virginia

Highway system
- Virginia Routes; Interstate; US; Primary; Secondary; Byways; History; HOT lanes

State Route 606 (SR 606) in the U.S. state of Virginia is a secondary route designation applied to multiple discontinuous road segments among the many counties. The list below describes the sections in each county that are designated SR 606.

== List ==
County	Length (mi)	Length (km)	From	Via	To	Notes
Accomack	0.35	0.56	SR 605 (Upshur Neck Road)	Harbor Point Road	Dead End	
Albemarle	6.16	9.91	SR 743 (Earlysville Road)	Dickerson Road Spring Hill Road	Greene County Line	Gap between segments ending at different points on SR 641
Alleghany	8.20	13.20	Clifton Forge Town Line	Sulphur Springs Road Unnamed road	Bath County Line	Gap between segments ending at different points on SR 699
Amelia	3.48	5.60	SR 610 (Wills Road)	Waldrop Road	SR 612 (Richmond Road)	
Amherst	1.80	2.90	SR 659 (Union Hill Road)	Dulwich Drive Fox Hall Drive	Dead End	Gap between segments ending at different points along US 60
Appomattox	3.50	5.63	Campbell County Line	New Chapel Road	Campbell County Line	
Augusta	0.54	0.87	Dead End	Gerties Lane	SR 660 (Lake Road)	
Bath	1.40	2.25	Alleghany County Line	McGraw Gap Road	US 220 (Ingalls Boulevard)	
Bedford	0.71	1.14	SR 698 (Creasy Road)	Dewey Road	SR 695 (Goose Creek Valley Road)	
Bland	13.52	21.76	US 52 (North Scenic Highway)	Wilderness Road	SR 42 (Bluegrass Highway)	Gap between segments ending at different points along SR 608
Botetourt	14.13	22.74	Craig County Line	Grove Hill Road Herndon Street Blue Ridge Turnpike Bethel Road	Dead End	Gap between segments ending at different points along SR 600 Gap between SR 1204 and SR 630 Gap between segments ending at different points along US 11 Gap between segments ending at different points along SR 640
Brunswick	29.65	47.72	SR 616 (Lew Jones Road)	Masons Mill Road Virginia Avenue Township Road Old Bridge Road Planters Road Brooks Crossing Belfield Road	Greensville County Line	Gap between segments ending at different points along SR 642 Gap between segments ending at different points along SR 634
Buchanan	1.30	2.09	Dickenson County Line	Rakes Ridge	SR 83	
Buckingham	8.20	13.20	SR 604 (Meadow Creek Road)	Spears Mountain Road Park Road	Dead End	
Campbell	7.68	12.36	SR 615 (Red House Road)	New Chapel Road	Appomattox County Line	
Caroline	6.63	10.67	Spotsylvania County Line	Stonewall Jackson Road	SR 2 (Fredericksburg Turnpike)	
Carroll	1.93	3.11	Grayson County Line	Fries Road Dixon Road	Dead End	
Charles City	0.30	0.48	SR 5 (John Tyler Memorial Highway)	Carters Mill Road	Henrico County Line	
Charlotte	6.92	11.14	SR 637 (Sylvan Hill Road)	Hamilton Road Bacon School Road	US 15 (Kings Highway)	
Chesterfield	4.04	6.50	Cul-de-Sac	Mount Hermon Road	SR 671 (Hallsboro Road)	Gap between segments ending at different points along SR 604
Clarke	9.94	16.00	US 50 (John S Mosby Highway)	Mount Carmel Road Feltner Road River Road	SR 7 (Harry Flood Byrd Highway)	
Craig	4.51	7.26	SR 615 (Craigs Creek Road)	Caldwell Mountain Road	Botetourt County Line	
Culpeper	1.00	1.61	Madison County Line	Novum Road	SR 608 (Oakland Road)	
Cumberland	0.90	1.45	Powhatan County Line	Blenheim Road	US 60 (Anderson Highway)	
Dickenson	1.75	2.82	SR 605	Unnamed road	Buchanan County Line	
Dinwiddie	3.40	5.47	SR 669 (Old Stage Road)	Reams Drive Oak Grove Road	Prince George County Line	Gap between segments ending at different points along SR 604
Essex	3.78	6.08	SR 607 (Muddy Gut Road)	Fairfield Lane Wares Mill Road	Dead End	
Fairfax	2.93	4.72	Herndon Town Limits	Baron Cameron Avenue	SR 7 (Leesburg Pike)	
Fauquier	1.10	1.77	SR 28 (Catlett Road)	Dumfries Road	Prince William County Line	
Floyd	0.60	0.97	SR 738 (Easter Creek Road)	Airport Road	Dead End	
Fluvanna	3.05	4.91	SR 659 (Stage Junction Road)	Rose Hill Road Rivanna Mills Road Hells Bend Road	SR 608 (Wilmington Road)	Gap between dead ends
Franklin	8.70	14.00	Henry County Line	Towns Creek Road Hawpatch Road	SR 607 (Fairfield Road)	Gap between segments ending at different points along SR 767
Frederick	2.90	4.67	Shenandoah County Line	Mountain Falls Road	SR 600/SR 608	
Giles	0.85	1.37	Dead End	Meadows Road	SR 100 (Pulaski Giles Turnpike)	
Gloucester	14.66	23.59	Dead End	Ark Road Farys Mill Road Harcum Road Deep Point Lane	Dead End	
Goochland	10.82	17.41	SR 6 (River Road)	Hadensville-Fife Road Three Chopt Road Walton Road	Louisa County Line	
Grayson	3.82	6.15	Galax City Limits	Water Wheel Road Windmill Road River Cross Lane Windmill Lane Unnamed Road Fries Road	Carroll County Line	Gap between segments ending at dead ends
Greene	1.20	1.93	Albemarle County Line	Spring Hill Road	SR 607 (Cedar Grove Road)	
Greensville	5.32	8.56	Brunswick County Line	Grassy Pond Road	SR 619 (Purdy Road)	
Halifax	2.30	3.70	Dead End	Rice School Road	SR 602 (Hitesburg Church Road)	
Hanover	17.51	28.18	SR 638 (Atlee Road)	Studley Road Old Church Road	New Kent County Line	
Henry	10.12	16.29	SR 754 (Edgewood Drive)	Oak Level Road Original Henry Road	Franklin County Line	Gap between segments ending at different points along SR 674
Highland	2.60	4.18	US 220	Unnamed road	SR 607	
Isle of Wight	5.77	9.29	SR 638 (Cut Thru Road/Clydesdale Drive)	Cut Thru Road Five Forks Road	Suffolk City Limits	
James City	8.01	12.89	SR 600 (Six Mount Zion Road)	Ware Creek Road Riverview Road Unnamed road	SR 735 (Plantation Drive)	Gap between segments ending at different points along SR 607
King and Queen	2.40	3.86	SR 605 (York River Road)	Taylorsville Road	SR 601 (Stratton Major Road)	
King George	0.61	0.98	Dead End	Rokeby Lane	SR 3/SR 677	
King William	2.33	3.75	Dead End	Commins Road	SR 608 (Upshaw Road)	
Lancaster	0.82	1.32	Dead End	Rehobeth Road	Northumberland County Line	
Lee	17.07	27.47	US 421	Unnamed road	Wise County Line	
Loudoun	11.17	17.98	SR 613 (Ticonderoga Road)/SR 620 (Braddock Road)	Loudoun County Parkway Old Ox Road	Herndon Town Line	
Louisa	2.80	4.51	Goochland County Line	Waltons Store Road	SR 640 (Old Mountain Road)	
Lunenburg	0.50	0.80	Dead End	Half Mile Lane	SR 137 (Dundas Road)	
Madison	4.40	7.08	SR 609 (Hoover Road)	Desert Road Novum Road	Culpeper County Line	Gap between segments ending at different points along SR 604
Mathews	0.90	1.45	Dead End	Diggs Wharf Road	SR 14 (John Clayton Memorial Highway)	
Mecklenburg	1.20	1.93	North Carolina State Line	Chandler Farm Road	SR 49	
Middlesex	4.52	7.27	US 17 (Tidewater Trail)	Dragon Road Glebe Landing Road	US 17 (Tidewater Trail)	
Montgomery	2.00	3.22	SR 673 (Camp Carysbrook Road)	Sidney Church Road	SR 669 (Fairview Church Road)	
Nelson	3.50	5.63	SR 626 (Norwood Road/Cabell Road	Buffalo Station Road	SR 626	
New Kent	7.40	11.91	SR 609 (Talleysville Road/Old Church Road)	Old Church Road	Hanover County Line	
Northampton	6.27	10.09	SR 600 (Seaside Road)	Rogers Drive Wardtown Road Morleys Wharf Road	Dead End	Gap between segments ending at different points along SR 183
Northumberland	2.75	4.43	SR 200	Shiloh School Road Cloverdale Road	Dead End	Gap between segments ending at different points along SR 605
Nottoway	5.46	8.79	US 460	Cottage Road Lee Lake Road	SR 609 (Green Hill Road)	Gap between segments ending at different points along SR 607
Orange	1.80	2.90	SR 692 (Saint Just Road)	Catharpin Road	SR 608 (Dulin Lane)	
Page	1.65	2.66	SR 759 (Jollett Road)	South Creek Road	Rockingham County Line	
Patrick	0.90	1.45	Dead End	Bent School Road	SR 601 (Bent Road)	
Pittsylvania	4.77	7.68	SR 630 (Hodnetts Road)	Edmunds Road	SR 40 (Gretna Road)	
Powhatan	2.40	3.86	Chesterfield County Line	Blenheim Road	SR 630 (Ballsville Road)	
Prince Edward	4.79	7.71	SR 612 (Sandy River Road)	Old Metcalf Road Piney Grove Road	US 460 (Prince Edward Highway)	Gap between segments ending at the Sandy River Reservoir
Prince George	0.50	0.80	Dinwiddie County Line	Reams Road	SR 622 (Providence Road)	
Prince William	1.60	2.57	Fauquier County Line	Warrenton Road	Dead End	
Pulaski	1.85	2.98	Dead End	Parrott Mountain Road	SR 600 (Parrott River Road)	
Rappahannock	1.00	1.61	SR 628 (Dearing Road)	Fodderstack Road	SR 641 (Alleen Road)	
Richmond	3.08	4.96	Dead End	Simonson Road	SR 608 (Farnham Creek Road)	
Roanoke	0.53	0.85	SR 603 (Bonsack Road)	Layman Road	Dead End	
Rockbridge	6.32	10.17	SR 252 (Brownsburg Turnpike)	Raphine Road	US 11 (Lee Highway)	
Russell	8.20	13.20	Dead End	Warren Baker Road Blanche Davis Road Gate Road Moccasin Ridge Road	SR 613 (Moccasin Valley Road)	Gap between segments ending at different points along SR 609 Gap between segments ending at different points along SR 604 Gap between segments ending at different points along SR 71
Scott	0.60	0.97	SR 704	Smith Hollow Lane	Dead End	
Shenandoah	1.90	3.06	SR 628 (Middle Road)	Gap Road	Frederick County Line	Gap between segments ending at different points along SR 623
Smyth	3.40	5.47	SR 604	Unnamed road Grosses Creek Road	Washington County Line	Gap between segments ending at different points along SR 605
Southampton	7.50	12.07	SR 35 (Plank Road)	Cabin Point Road	Sussex County Line	
Spotsylvania	17.61	28.34	SR 608 (Catharpin Road)	Post Oak Road Morris Road Mudd Tavern Road	Caroline County Line	Gap between segments ending at different points along SR 208
Stafford	4.53	7.29	SR 3 (Kings Highway)	Ferry Road Ringgold Road Boscobel Road	Cul-de-Sac	Gap between segments ending at different points along SR 608
Surry	0.80	1.29	SR 601 (Huntington Road)	Averys Mill Pond Road	Dead End	
Sussex	14.87	23.93	Southampton County Line	Union Hill Road Unnamed road Beaver Dam Road	SR 40/SR 613	
Tazewell	1.85	2.98	Dead End	Six Farm Road	SR 602 (Pleasant Hill Church Road)	
Warren	2.48	3.99	Front Royal Town Limits	Shenandoah Shores Road	Dead End	
Washington	0.58	0.93	Smyth County Line	Grosses Creek Road	Dead End	
Westmoreland	5.85	9.41	SR 612 (Coles Point Road)	Tucker Hill Road Old Yeocomico Road Bancton Road	Dead End	Gap between segments ending at different points along SR 604
Wise	0.25	0.40	US 23 Bus	Austin Hills Road	Dead End	
Wythe	0.60	0.97	SR 605 (Dunford Road)	Blair Road	SR 634 (Rickey Road)	
York	3.07	4.94	SR 600 (Big Bethel Road)	Running Man Trail Calthrop Neck Road	Dead End	
