= Virginia State Route 637 =

State highway in Virginia, United States

State Route 637

Route information
- Maintained by VDOT

Location
- Country: United States
- State: Virginia

Highway system
- Virginia Routes; Interstate; US; Primary; Secondary; Byways; History; HOT lanes

State Route 637 (SR 637) in the U.S. state of Virginia is a secondary route designation applied to multiple discontinuous road segments among the many counties. The list below describes the sections in each county that are designated SR 637.

== List ==
County	Length (mi)	Length (km)	From	Via	To	Notes
Accomack	4.00	6.44	SR 638 (Evans Wharf Road)	Omega Road Mount Nebo Road Finneys Wharf Road	Dead End	Gap between segments ending at different points along SR 638
Albemarle	16.31	26.25	Nelson County Line	Dick Woods Road	US 250 (Ivy Road)	Gap between segments ending at different points along SR 691 Gap between segments ending at different points along SR 635
Alleghany	0.50	0.80	SR 687 (Jackson River Road)	Sycamore Bend Lane	Dead End	
Amelia	2.99	4.81	SR 636 (Giles Road)	Giles Road	SR 609 (Royalton Road)	
Amherst	4.10	6.60	SR 635 (Buffalo Springs Turnpike)	Sugar Hill Tunnel Road	SR 636 (Slap Creek Road)	
Appomattox	0.82	1.32	Dead End	Chestnut Grove Road	SR 636 (Chestnut Grove Road/Rock Spring Road)	
Augusta	3.50	5.63	SR 608 (Tinkling Spring Road)	Barterbrook Road Jericho Road	US 250 (Jefferson Highway)	Gap between segments ending at different points along SR 635
Bath	1.25	2.01	SR 665 (Cabin Draft)	Lower Yard	Dead End	
Bedford	15.00	24.14	SR 670 (Roaring Run Road)	Hawkins Ridge Road Glass Hill Road Oslin Creek Road Charlemont Road Penns Mill Road Camden Road	SR 122 (Big Island Highway)	Gap between segments ending at different points along SR 644 Gap between segments ending at different points along SR 643
Bland	0.10	0.16	SR 615 (Railroad Trail)	Starks Street	SR 636 (Walnut Drive)	
Botetourt	0.95	1.53	SR 636 (Black Magic Farm Road/Little Timber Ridge)	Connect Road Sleepy Hollow Road	Dead End	Gap between SR 635 and SR 629
Brunswick	2.90	4.67	SR 621 (Meherrin River Road)	Old Indian Road	SR 639 (Old Indian Road/Rustic Road)	
Buchanan	1.90	3.06	Dead End	Bearwallow	SR 616	
Buckingham	3.90	6.28	SR 638 (Sanders Creek Road)	Maple Bridge Road Fair Oaks Road	Dead End	
Campbell	2.10	3.38	SR 761 (Long Island Road)	Whitehall Road	SR 635 (Collins Ferry Road)	
Caroline	0.40	0.64	SR 625 (Passing Road)	Hustle Road	Essex County Line	
Carroll	1.08	1.74	SR 100 (Sylvatus Highway)	High Ridge Road Greenbriar Road	Wythe County Line	
Charles City	0.50	0.80	SR 609 (Barnetts Road)	Wyatts Lane	Dead End	
Charlotte	10.09	16.24	SR 607 (Roanoke Station Road)	Sylvan Hill Road Saxkey Road	SR 47/SR 59	
Chesterfield	6.21	9.99	SR 145 (Centralia Road)	Hopkins Road	Richmond City Limits	
Clarke	0.45	0.72	Dead End	Unnamed road	Dead End	Gap between segments ending at different points along SR 761
Craig	0.47	0.76	SR 638	Unnamed road	SR 649	
Culpeper	1.15	1.85	SR 644 (Reva Road)	Shanktown Road Memory Lane	Dead End	
Cumberland	2.47	3.98	SR 668 (Airport Road)	Airport Road	SR 45 (Cumberland Road)	
Dickenson	14.33	23.06	SR 72 (Cranes Nest Road)	Unnamed road DC Caney Ridge Road Unnamed road	SR 63 (Big Ridge Road)	
Dinwiddie	0.49	0.79	SR 645 (Wheelers Pond Road)	Madison Road	Dead End	
Essex	11.08	17.83	Caroline County Line	Hustle Road Occupacia Road Laytons Landing Road	Dead End	Gap between segments ending at different points along US 17
Fairfax	2.40	3.86	Cul-de-Sac	Accotink Road Newington Road Cinder Bed Road	Dead End	Gap between segments ending at different points along SR 877
Fauquier	8.92	14.36	SR 651 (Sumerduck Road)	Courtneys Corner Road Shipps Store Road Razor Hill Road Ensors Shop Road Courtney School Road	SR 616 (Bristersburg Road)	Gap between segments ending at different points along SR 806 Gap between segments ending at different points along SR 610
Floyd	4.38	7.05	SR 710 (Woods Gap Road)	New Haven Road Chestnut Lane Thomas Farm Road	SR 635 (County Line Church Road)	
Fluvanna	6.18	9.95	SR 6 (Canal Street)	Poplar Spring Road Antioch Road	SR 620 (Rolling Road)	
Franklin	3.15	5.07	SR 793/SR 825	Griffith Hill Road Brandy Oak Road	SR 788 (Dry Hill Road)	Gap between segments ending at different points along SR 789
Frederick	0.40	0.64	Warren County Line	Salem Church Road	SR 735 (Riding Chapel Road)	
Giles	1.86	2.99	US 460 Bus	Hillcrest Heights Road	Cul-de-Sac	
Gloucester	2.30	3.70	SR 610 (Salem Church Road)	Turks Ferry Road	SR 198 (Glenns Road)	
Goochland	1.50	2.41	SR 632 (Fairground Road)	Hawk Town Road	SR 634 (Maidens Road)	
Grayson	3.00	4.83	SR 634 (Grinders Mill Road)	Englewood Road	SR 636 (Beech Grove Lane)	
Greene	7.50	12.07	SR 230 (Madison Road)	Octonia Road South River Road Pocosan Mountain Road	Dead End	
Greensville	0.60	0.97	SR 608	Unnamed road	Dead End	
Halifax	1.80	2.90	SR 670 (Sandy Ridge Road)	Cherry Creek Road	SR 638 (Bull Creek Road)	
Hanover	3.77	6.07	US 301/SR 2 (Chamberlayne Road)	Atlee Station Road	SR 656 (Sliding Hill Road)	
Henry	3.90	6.28	SR 87 (Morehead Avenue)	Kings Mill Road	SR 87 (Morehead Road)	
Highland	10.10	16.25	SR 84 (Mill Gap Road)	Unnamed road	SR 640 (Blue Grass Valley Road)	
Isle of Wight	15.83	25.48	SR 603 (Everets Road)	Orbit Road Central Hill Road Racetrack Road Jones Town Drive	SR 621 (Mill Swamp Road)	Gap between segments ending at different points along US 258
King and Queen	1.40	2.25	Dead End	Chatham Hill Road	SR 634 (Canterbury Road)	
King George	0.64	1.03	Dead End	Ridgeway Drive	SR 3 (Kings Highway)	
King William	1.30	2.09	SR 619 (Horse Landing Road)	White Oak Landing Road	Dead End	
Lancaster	1.85	2.98	Dead End	James Wharf Road	SR 3 (Mary Ball Road)	
Lee	0.63	1.01	Dead End	Unnamed road	SR 634	
Loudoun	4.22	6.79	SR 625 (Church Road)	Cascades Parkway Potomac View ROad	SR 1582 (Algonkian Parkway)	
Louisa	2.50	4.02	SR 613 (Poindexter Road)	Brickhouse Road	SR 649 (Byrd Mill Road)	
Lunenburg	13.82	22.24	Mecklenburg County Line	Craig Mill Road Broad Street	SR 40	
Madison	1.40	2.25	SR 673 (Cedar Hill Road)	Clore Road	Dead End	
Mathews	1.10	1.77	Dead End	Gwynnsville Road	SR 633 (Old Ferry Road)	
Mecklenburg	3.55	5.71	South Hill Tow Limits	Chaptico Road	Lunenburg County Line	
Middlesex	1.35	2.17	SR 602 (Old Virginia Street)	Flats Road	Dead End	
Montgomery	10.05	16.17	SR 753 (Old Town Road)	Alleghany Spring Road Jewell Drive	Roanoke County Line	Gap between dead ends
Nelson	0.07	0.11	SR 750 (Old Turnpike Road)	Dick Woods Lane	Albemarle County Line	
New Kent	1.50	2.41	SR 249 (New Kent Highway)	Cumberland Road	Dead End	
Northampton	1.50	2.41	SR 639 (Sunnyside Road)	Pat Town Road	SR 636 (Mount Hebron Road)	
Northumberland	1.10	1.77	SR 604 (Sydnors Millpond Road)	Betts Bottom	SR 636 (Newmans Neck Road)	
Nottoway	0.07	0.11	SR 638 (Plum Street)	Sixth Street	SR 700 (Gum Street)	
Orange	2.18	3.51	SR 647 (Old Gordonsville Road)	Tomahawk Creek Road	SR 612 (Monrovia Road)	
Page	2.51	4.04	SR 634	Piney Hill Road	SR 633 (Mill Creek Crossroads)	
Patrick	2.30	3.70	SR 639 (Cherry Creek Road)	Shotgun Road Red Rough Road Strawberry Hill Road	SR 610 (Busted Rock Road)	Gap between segments ending at different points along SR 636
Pittsylvania	3.70	5.95	SR 642 (Shula Drive)	Jacobs Lane Country Club Road	SR 634 (Prospect Road)	
Powhatan	1.00	1.61	SR 625 (Powhatan Lakes Road)	Howell Road	Dead End	
Prince Edward	1.89	3.04	SR 628 (Leigh Mountain Road)	Worsham Drive	SR 636 (Poorhouse Road)	
Prince George	0.70	1.13	Sussex County Line	Log Road	SR 35 (Courtland Road)	
Prince William	0.46	0.74	US 1 (Jefferson Davis Highway)	Easy Street	US 1/SR 687	
Pulaski	1.00	1.61	SR 636 (Black Hollow Road)	Montague Road	Dead End	
Rappahannock	11.80	18.99	SR 645 (Hackleys Mill Road)	South Poes Road North Poes Road Jericho Road	US 522 (Zachary Taylor Avenue)	Gap between segments ending at different points along SR 647
Richmond	6.14	9.88	Dead End	Kinderhook Pike County Bridge Road Piney Grove Road	SR 621 (Piney Grove Road/Menokin Road)	Gap between segments ending at different points along SR 624 Gap between segments ending at different points along SR 690
Roanoke	1.82	2.93	Montgomery County Line	Bottom Creek Lane	SR 607 (Bottom Creek Road)	
Rockbridge	0.25	0.40	Dead End	Walnut Flat Drive	SR 646 (Big Hill Road)	
Rockingham	3.76	6.05	Dead End	Bryant Hollow Road Florist Road	US 33 Bus	Gap between segments ending at different points along SR 602
Russell	7.45	11.99	SR 646 (Tunnel Road)	Thompson Creek Road Putnam Road Drill Road Wysor Valley Road Gardner Road Tigertown Road	SR 67 (Swords Creek Road)	Gap between dead ends Gap between segments ending at different points along SR 80
Scott	1.38	2.22	SR 713 (Stanley Valley Road)	Cameron Church Road Hidden Valley Road	SR 635	Gap between segments ending at different points along SR 632
Shenandoah	0.93	1.50	SR 638 (Junction Road)	Powhatan Road	SR 55 (John Marshall Highway)	
Smyth	2.50	4.02	SR 774 (Lyons Gap Road)	Carlock Creek Road	SR 617 (Horseshoe Bend Road)	
Southampton	3.30	5.31	SR 635 (Back Creek Road)	Harris Road	SR 645 (Vicksville Road)	Gap between segments ending at different points along SR 640
Spotsylvania	0.09	0.14	Dead End	Unnamed road	SR 636 (Hood Drive)	
Stafford	3.55	5.71	US 1 (Jefferson Davis Highway)	Telegraph Road	Marine Corps Base Quantico boundary	
Surry	2.39	3.85	SR 634 (Alliance Road)	Poplar Lawn Road Pleasant Point Road	SR 31 (Rolfe Highway)	Gap between segments ending at different points along SR 636
Sussex	9.09	14.63	SR 626 (Courthouse Road)	Cabin Stick Bethal Church Road	Prince George County Line	Gap between segments ending at different points along SR 640
Tazewell	19.58	31.51	US 19	Limestone Road Pounding Mill Branch Road Cochran Hollow Road Jumps Road Dry Fork Road	West Virginia State Line (CR 9)	Gap between segments ending at different points along SR 631
Warren	7.14	11.49	Dead End	Unnamed road Guard Hill Road River Road Unnamed road	Frederick County Line	
Washington	1.44	2.32	Bristol City Limits	Miller Hill Road	SR 633 (Reedy Creek Road)	
Westmoreland	7.22	11.62	SR 640 (Grants Hill Church Road)	Leedstown Road Rappahannock Road	SR 634 (Claymont Road)	
Wise	0.93	1.50	Dead End	Unnamed road	SR 632	
Wythe	1.40	2.25	Carroll County Line	Greenbriar Road	SR 100 (Wysor Highway)	
York	3.49	5.62	Newport News City Limits	Crawford Road Union Road	Dead End	Gap between SR 238 and SR 704
