= Virginia State Route 678 =

State highway in Virginia, United States

State Route 678

Route information
- Maintained by VDOT

Location
- Country: United States
- State: Virginia

Highway system
- Virginia Routes; Interstate; US; Primary; Secondary; Byways; History; HOT lanes

State Route 678 (SR 678) in the U.S. state of Virginia is a secondary route designation applied to multiple discontinuous road segments among the many counties. The list below describes the sections in each county that are designated SR 678.

== List ==
County	Length (mi)	Length (km)	From	Via	To	Notes
Accomack	2.45	3.94	SR 669 (Fisher Road)	Mill Road County Road	SR 676 (Dennis Drive)	Gap between the Parksley town limits and SR 176
Albemarle	7.98	12.84	US 250 (Ivy Road)	Owensville Road Decca Lane Ridge Road	SR 601 (Free Union Road)	Gap between segments ending at different points along SR 614
Alleghany	0.80	1.29	SR 311 (Kanawha Trail)	Stringer Road	Dead End	
Amelia	0.30	0.48	SR 642 (Amelia Springs Road)	Cherry Row Lane	Dead End	
Amherst	0.20	0.32	US 29 Bus/SR 730	Highview Drive	US 29 Bus	
Appomattox	0.46	0.74	SR 1102 (Pecan Street/Church Street)	Church Street	Dead End	
Augusta	0.50	0.80	Dead End	Yeago Lane	SR 677 (Shemariah Road)	
Bath	17.76	28.58	SR 39 (Mountain Valley Road)	Indian Draft Road	Highland County line	Formerly SR 269
Bedford	2.65	4.26	Dead End	Parker Road	SR 43 (Peaks Road)	
Bland	3.57	5.75	SR 61 (Wolf Creek Highway)	Shady Branch Circle	SR 61 (Wolf Creek Highway)	
Botetourt	1.20	1.93	Dead End	Three Oaks Road	SR 615 (Craig Creek Road)	
Brunswick	3.25	5.23	SR 713 (Main Street)	Railroad Street Loblolly Drive	SR 750 (Pineview Road)	
Buchanan	0.10	0.16	SR 641 (Patterson Road)	Patterson Road	Dead End	
Buckingham	4.14	6.66	SR 20 (Constitution Route)	Rock Island Road	SR 627 (Warren Ferry Road/Axtell Road)	
Campbell	1.68	2.70	Lynchburg city limits	Airport Road	Dead End	
Caroline	0.12	0.19	SR 644 (Bagby Road)	Jerusalem Road	SR 721 (Newtown Road)	
Carroll	0.60	0.97	SR 679/SR 691	Old Dominion Road	Patrick County line	
Charlotte	6.15	9.90	Dead End	Ridgeway Road Francisco Road Aspen Road	SR 40 (Patrick Henry Highway)	Gap between segments ending at different points along SR 649
Chesterfield	8.06	12.97	Dead End	West Providence Road Providence Road South Providence Road North Providence Road Buford Road	SR 147 (Huguenot Road)	
Clarke	0.13	0.21	Dead End	Rocky Bank Lane	SR 255 (Bishop Meade Road)	
Craig	0.22	0.35	SR 656 (Woodman Avenue)	Brooks Street	SR 679	
Culpeper	0.30	0.48	SR 676 (Berry Hill Road)/FR 718	Elkwood Crossing	SR 674 (Kellys Ford Road)	
Cumberland	0.50	0.80	SR 638 (Guinea Road)	Cotton Town Road	Dead End	
Dickenson	1.08	1.74	Dead End	Unnamed road	SR 607	
Dinwiddie	1.00	1.61	SR 605 (Ellington Road)	Spain Drive	SR 606 (Oak Grove Road)	
Essex	0.30	0.48	SR 662 (Harris Hill Road)	Clydeside Road	Dead End	
Fairfax	0.67	1.08	SR 702 (Beulah Road)	Atwood Road	SR 7 (Leesburg Pike)	
Fauquier	6.64	10.69	SR 681 (Cliff Mills Road)	Piney Mountain Road Waterloo Road Academy Hill Road	SR 674 (Frytown Road)	Gap between segments ending at different points along SR 691 Gap between SR 680 and the Warrenton town limits
Floyd	1.30	2.09	SR 640 (Franklin Pike)	Kelley School Road	SR 651 (Stuart Road)	
Fluvanna	1.50	2.41	SR 625 (Oak Creek Road)	Miles Jackson Road	SR 663 (Georges Mill Road)	
Franklin	11.19	18.01	SR 116 (Jubal Early Highway)	Truman Hill Road Poteet Road Farmington Drive Edwardsville Road Edmunds Mill Road Keffer Road Northridge Road	SR 1201 (Fenwick Lane)	Gap between segments ending at different points along SR 634 Gap between segments ending at different points along SR 636
Frederick	1.00	1.61	SR 679 (Indian Hollow Road)	Burnt Church Road	US 522 (Frederick Pike)	
Giles	0.84	1.35	US 460 (Virginia Avenue)	Bowens Road	SR 615 (Kow Camp Road)	
Gloucester	0.80	1.29	SR 606 (Deep Point Lane/Harcum Road)	Harcum Road	Dead End	
Goochland	1.00	1.61	Dead End	Marlin Road	SR 616 (Stokes Station Road)	
Grayson	5.30	8.53	US 58 (Wilson Highway)	Fox Ridge Road Fox Creek Road	SR 658 (Flat Ridge Road)	
Greene	0.15	0.24	SR 616 (Carpenters Mill Road)	Rucker Drive	Cul-de-Sac	
Greensville	0.35	0.56	Dead End	Mitchelle Mill Road	SR 629 (Lifsey Road)	
Halifax	4.30	6.92	SR 681 (Union Church Road)	Grubby Road	SR 654 (Singi Road)	
Hanover	1.80	2.90	SR 715 (Beaver Dam Road)	Union Church Road	SR 738 (Teman Road)	
Henry	1.50	2.41	SR 626 (Morningside Drive)	Boxwood Lane	SR 677 (Orchard Drive)	
Highland	13.58	21.85	Bath County line	Unnamed road Bullpasture River Road	US 250 (Highland Turnpike)	Formerly SR 269
Isle of Wight	2.10	3.38	SR 626 (Mill Swamp Road)	Bethany Church Road	SR 677 (Wrenns Mill Road)	
James City	0.36	0.58	Cul-de-Sac	Ruth Lane	SR 614 (Centerville Road)	
King and Queen	1.41	2.27	SR 33 (Lewis Puller Memorial Highway)	Centerville Road	SR 14/SR 33 (Lewis Puller Memorial Highway)	
King George	0.51	0.82	SR 3 (Kings Highway)	Saint Anthonys Road	SR 610 (Saint Anthonys Road/Millbank Road)	
King William	0.60	0.97	Dead End	Flotbeck Road	SR 629 (Acquinton Church Road)	
Lancaster	0.64	1.03	Dead End	Hudnall Lane	SR 615 (Carlson Road)	
Lee	0.38	0.61	SR 661 (Flatwoods Road)	Unnamed road	SR 679	Gap between dead ends
Loudoun	0.60	0.97	SR 682 (Rodeffer Road)	Lutheran Church Road	SR 676 (Everhart Road)	
Louisa	2.50	4.02	SR 691 (Old Louisa Road)	Hanback Road	Dead End	
Lunenburg	8.10	13.04	SR 680 (Crymes Road)	Hart Road Doswell Town Road	Prince Edward County line	
Madison	0.62	1.00	SR 607 (Ridgeview Road)	Tibbs Shop Road	US 29 (Seminole Trail)	
Mathews	0.39	0.63	Dead End	Baby Lane	SR 622 (Long Road)	
Mecklenburg	11.01	17.72	SR 4 (Buggs Island Road)	Mayes Chapel Road Antlers Road Landfill Road	SR 675	Gap between segments ending at different points along SR 707
Middlesex	0.41	0.66	SR 3 (Greys Point Road)	Robinson Lane	Dead End	
Montgomery	0.80	1.29	SR 8 (Riner Road)	Governor Barbour Street	SR 616 (Rustic Ridge Road)	
Nelson	5.40	8.69	SR 674 (Rose Mill Road)	Waddill Lane Saint James Church Road Emblys Gap Road	SR 666 (Jacks Hill Road/Dickie Road)	Gap between segments ending at different points along SR 151 Gap between segments ending at different points along SR 676
New Kent	1.95	3.14	Dead End	Slatersville Road	SR 249 (New Kent Highway)	
Northampton	0.35	0.56	SR 606 (Rogers Drive)	Pine Avenue	US 13 (Lankford Highway)	
Northumberland	1.97	3.17	SR 609 (Browns Store Road)	Old Tipers Road	SR 200 (Jesse DuPont Memorial Highway)	
Nottoway	0.33	0.53	Dead End	Oak Street	SR 724 (First Street Southwest)	
Orange	1.38	2.22	US 33 (Spotswood Trail)	Governor Barbour Street	US 33 (Spotswood Trail)	
Page	0.37	0.60	US 340 Bus	Al Good Drive	Dead End	
Patrick	2.90	4.67	SR 8 (Woolwine Highway)	Raven Den Lane Eanes Mountain Road	SR 710 (Woods Gap Road)	Gap between dead ends
Pittsylvania	2.20	3.54	SR 640 (Riceville Road)	Corner Road	Dead End	
Powhatan	1.30	2.09	US 60 (James Anderson Highway)	Rocky Oak Road	US 60 (James Anderson Highway)	
Prince Edward	0.45	0.72	Dead End	Mount Moriah Road	SR 695 (Tuggle Road)	
Prince William	0.10	0.16	Dead End	Barbee Street	SR 619 (Bristow Road)	
Rappahannock	0.55	0.89	US 211 (Lee Highway)	Jordans Road	US 211 (Lee Highway)	
Richmond	0.80	1.29	Dead End	Pea Ridge Lane	SR 624 (Newland Road)	
Roanoke	0.52	0.84	Dead End	Sandlewood Road	SR 679 (Buck Mountain Road)	
Rockbridge	1.87	3.01	SR 610 (Plank Road)	Unnamed road	US 11 (Lee Highway)	Gap between dead ends
Rockingham	4.00	6.44	SR 995 (Koiner Ford Road)	Faughts Road Scotts Ford Road Beards Ford Road	SR 669 (Diehls Ford Road/Beards Ford Road)	Gap between segments ending at different points along SR 276
Russell	12.72	20.47	SR 71	Lower Copper Creek Road Upper Copper Creek Road Unnamed road Fletcher Lane	US 58 Alt	Gap between segments ending at different points along SR 606
Scott	3.40	5.47	Dead End	Unnamed road	SR 680 (Twin Springs Road)	Gap between segments ending at different points along SR 671
Shenandoah	20.33	32.72	SR 675 (Camp Roosevelt Road)	Unnamed road Fort Valley Road	Warren County line	
Smyth	2.30	3.70	SR 612	Park Hollow Road	Wythe County line	
Southampton	2.30	3.70	SR 684 (Monroe Road)	Unnamed road	SR 677 (Barns Church Road)	
Spotsylvania	3.03	4.88	SR 605 (Marye Road)	Shepherds Road	Dead End	
Stafford	0.80	1.29	SR 604 (Belle Plains Road)	Camp Selden Road	SR 605 (New Hope Church Road)	
Sussex	0.27	0.43	SR 677 (Branch Street)	Unnamed road Higgins Street	SR 682 (Knight Street)	
Tazewell	0.70	1.13	Tazewell town limits	Market Street	SR 645 (Blacks Chapel Road/Lake Witten Road)	
Warren	1.77	2.85	Shenandoah County line	Fort Valley Road	SR 55/SR 610	
Washington	0.80	1.29	Dead End	Vances Mill Road	SR 670 (Spoon Gap Road)	
Westmoreland	0.76	1.22	Dead End	Harts Landing Road	SR 625 (Horners Mill Road)	
Wise	1.00	1.61	Dead End	Unnamed road	SR 671 (North Fork Road)	
Wythe	0.83	1.34	Smyth County line	Unnamed road Fox Fire Road	SR 813	Gap between Smyth County line and SR 813
York	0.56	0.90	SR 1204 (Cockletown Road)	Cockletown Road Harrod Lane	SR 634 (Old York Hampton Highway)	
