= Virginia State Route 674 =

State highway in Virginia, United States

State Route 674

Route information
- Maintained by VDOT

Location
- Country: United States
- State: Virginia

Highway system
- Virginia Routes; Interstate; US; Primary; Secondary; Byways; History; HOT lanes

State Route 674 (SR 674) in the U.S. state of Virginia is a secondary route designation applied to multiple discontinuous road segments among the many counties. The list below describes the sections in each county that are designated SR 674.

== List ==
County	Length (mi)	Length (km)	From	Via	To	Notes
Accomack	3.57	5.75	Dead End	Parkers Landing Road Saint Thomas Road Maxwell Street Staunton Avenue Adelaide Street	SR 678 (County Road)	Gap between segments ending at different points along SR 675 Gap between segments ending at different points along SR 658
Albemarle	5.99	9.64	SR 614 (Sugar Hollow Road)	Sugar Ridge Road Break Heart Road Clark ROad	SR 671 (Millington Road)	Gap between segments ending at different points along SR 810
Alleghany	0.04	0.06	Dead End	Sweetbriar Avenue	SR 654	
Amelia	1.40	2.25	Dead End	Crayton Lane	SR 612 (Richmond Road)	
Amherst	2.35	3.78	SR 151 (Patrick Henry Highway)	Roses Mill Road Athole Lane	Nelson County line	
Appomattox	0.90	1.45	US 460 (Richmond Highway)	Depot Lane	US 460 (Richmond Highway)	
Augusta	2.10	3.38	SR 670 (Wagon Shop Road)	Pilson Road	SR 675 (Broadhead School Road)	
Bath	0.09	0.14	SR 644 (Broadhead School Road)	Mill Race Lane	Dead End	
Bedford	2.10	3.38	SR 644 (Lankford Mill Road)	Lazenbury Road	SR 643 (Otterville Road)	
Bland	0.15	0.24	US 52 (South Scenic Highway)	Meadowview Road	Dead End	
Botetourt	0.84	1.35	Dead End	Tinker Mill Road	US 220 (Roanoke Road)	
Brunswick	5.50	8.85	SR 611 (Dry Bread Road)	Greentown Drive	SR 673 (Reavis Gin Road)	
Buchanan	1.70	2.74	SR 83	Upper Mill Branch Road	Dead End	
Buckingham	0.37	0.60	SR 683 (Mohele Road)	Whitaker Farm Road	Dead End	
Campbell	0.33	0.53	SR 738 (Greenhouse Road)	Livestock Road	Dead End	
Caroline	1.60	2.57	Dead End	Burnetts Road	SR 627 (Mattaponi Trail)	
Carroll	5.50	8.85	SR 685 (Skyview Drive)	Red Hill Road	US 58 (Danville Pike)	
Charlotte	1.30	2.09	SR 672 (Midway Road)	Jordans Gate School Road	SR 40 (Patrick Henry Highway)	
Chesterfield	0.37	0.60	SR 675 (Robious Road)	Cranbeck Road	SR 147 (Huguenot Road)	
Clarke	0.80	1.29	SR 660 (Russell Road)	Cather Road	SR 656 (Longmarsh Road)	
Craig	0.19	0.31	SR 648 (Herndon Avenue)	Chilton Avenue	SR 311 (Craig Valley Drive)	
Culpeper	5.01	8.06	US 15/US 29 (James Madison Highway)/FR 717 (Richlands Road)	Kellys Ford Road	SR 620 (Edwards Shop Road)	
Cumberland	1.20	1.93	Dead End	Edge Hill Road	SR 654 (Sunnyside Road)	
Dickenson	0.15	0.24	Dead End	Unnamed road	SR 652 (Dr Ralph Stanley Highway)	
Dinwiddie	1.85	2.98	SR 613 (Squirrel Level Road)	Wheaton Road	SR 670 (Duncan Road)	
Essex	1.41	2.27	US 17 (Tidewater Trail)	Marl Bank Road	Dead End	
Fairfax	11.00	17.70	Dead End	Palmer Street Hunter Mill Road Springvale Road	SR 603 (Beach Mill Road)	Gap between segments ending at different points along SR 123 Gap between SR 606 and SR 7
Fauquier	17.03	27.41	SR 837 (Old Marsh Road)	Green Road Lunsford Road Frytown Road Atlee Road Grays Mill Road Village Drive Georgetown Road Blantyre Road	SR 55 (John Marshall Highway)	Gap between segments ending at different points along SR 616 Gap between segments ending at different points along SR 670 Gap between segments ending at different points along SR 605 Gap between segments ending at different points along SR 673 Gap between segments ending at different points along US 29 Gap between segments ending at different points along SR 628
Floyd	0.25	0.40	Dead End	Dove Lane	SR 615 (Christiansburg Pike)	
Fluvanna	0.20	0.32	Goochland County line	Timber Road	SR 659 (Stage Junction Road)	
Franklin	10.15	16.33	US 220 Bus (Main Street)	Doe Run Road Burwell Road Vic Tree Road Timber Ridge Road Long Horne Road	Dead End	Gap between dead ends Gap between SR 718 and SR 40 Gap between segments ending at different points along SR 834
Frederick	0.80	1.29	SR 654 (Frog Hollow Road)	Winding Hill Road	SR 739 (Apple Pie Ridge Road)	
Giles	0.87	1.40	Dead End	Woodland Drive	SR 637 (Hillcrest Heights Road)	
Gloucester	0.60	0.97	SR 198 (Dutton Road)	Hatch Road	SR 198 (Dutton Road)	
Goochland	0.20	0.32	Dead End	Timber Road	Fluvanna County line	
Grayson	3.45	5.55	SR 768 (Honey Grove Road)	Roberts Cove Road	SR 658 (Comers Rock Road)	Gap between segments ending at different points along SR 672
Greene	1.95	3.14	Dead End	Parker Mountain Road	SR 604 (Celt Road)	
Halifax	2.60	4.18	SR 676 (Ashbury Church Road/Thompson Store Road)	Blue Rock Road Blue Rock Trail	Dead End	
Hanover	3.15	5.07	US 33 (Mountain Road)	Woodman Hall Road	SR 631 (Old Ridge Road)	
Henry	8.20	13.20	SR 57 (Fairystone Park Highway)	Trent Hill Drive Philpott Road Philpott Drive Oak Level Road	US 220 (Virginia Avenue)	
Isle of Wight	1.21	1.95	SR 10 Bus	Blounts Corner Road	SR 673 (Morgans Beach Road)	
James City	0.31	0.50	Dead End	Leisure Road	SR 746 (Old Stage Road)	
King and Queen	0.29	0.47	Dead End	Shepards Warehouse Road	SR 605 (Chain Ferry Road)	
King George	0.14	0.23	SR 675 (Williams Creek Road)	Forest Road	SR 671 (Gordon Drive)	
King William	0.20	0.32	SR 605 (Manfield Road)	McPherson Drive	Dead End	
Lancaster	0.50	0.80	SR 200 (Irvington Road)	Woods Drive	Dead End	
Lee	2.10	3.38	US 58	Unnamed road	SR 682 (Giles Hollow Road)	
Loudoun	2.43	3.91	Dead End	Dutchmans Creek Road	SR 673 (Irish Corner Road)	
Louisa	1.10	1.77	Dead End	Sugarplum Road	SR 649 (Byrd Mill Road)	
Lunenburg	0.90	1.45	SR 49 (Courthouse Road)	Trinity Road	SR 675 (Hardy Road)	
Madison	0.15	0.24	Dead End	Spring Oak Lane	SR 672 (Doubletop Road)	
Mathews	0.35	0.56	Dead End	Queens Creek Road	SR 626 (Hallieford Road)	
Mecklenburg	1.50	2.41	US 58/SR 4	Wooden Bridge Road	SR 669 (Baskerville Road)	
Middlesex	0.16	0.26	SR 618 (Oakes Landing Road)	Bowden Street	SR 706 (C F Edwards Lane)	
Montgomery	6.25	10.06	Dead End	Elliot Creek Road Craigs Mountain Road	SR 615 (Pilot Road)	
Nelson	5.36	8.63	Amherst County line	Rose Mill Road Jennys Creek Road Cow Hollow Road	SR 56 (Crabtree Falls Highway)	Gap between segments ending at different points along SR 151/SR 56
New Kent	0.51	0.82	Dead End	Clint Lane	SR 249 (New Kent Highway)	
Northampton	1.25	2.01	Dead End	Kendall Grove Road	US 13 (Lankford Highway)	
Northumberland	1.00	1.61	Dead End	Crabbetown Road	US 360 (Northumberland Highway)	
Nottoway	0.31	0.50	US 360 Bus	Simmons Street	Dead End	
Orange	1.91	3.07	SR 633 (Spicers Mill Road)	Little Skyline Drive	US 15 (James Madison Highway)	
Page	0.30	0.48	US 211 (Lee Highway)	Red Church Road	SR 658	
Patrick	1.70	2.74	SR 672 (The Hollow Road)	Farmers Road	SR 675 (Friends Mission Road)	
Pittsylvania	1.70	2.74	SR 676 (Taylors Mill Road)	Player Road	SR 40 (Gretna Road)	
Prince George	0.91	1.46	SR 156 (Prince George Drive)	Mount Sinai Road	SR 156 (Prince George Drive)	
Prince William	6.08	9.78	SR 1040 (Limestone Drive)	Wellington Road	Manassas city limits	
Pulaski	1.57	2.53	Dead End	Pond Lick Hollow Road	Pulaski town limits	
Rappahannock	1.49	2.40	Dead End	Grand View Road	SR 621 (Hunters Road)	
Richmond	0.40	0.64	Dead End	Kellys Lane	SR 621 (Menokin Road)	
Roanoke	0.66	1.06	US 220 (Franklin Road)	Clearbrook Lane	US 220 (Franklin Road)	
Rockbridge	5.45	8.77	Dead End	Unnamed road	SR 670	Gap between segments ending at different points along SR 251
Rockingham	1.20	1.93	SR 708 (Goods Mill Road)	Bluff Road Duck Run Road	SR 655 (Lawyer Road)	Gap between segments ending at different points along SR 676
Russell	1.35	2.17	US 19	Purcell Road	Dead End	
Scott	1.50	2.41	SR 673 (Saratoga Lane)	Unnamed road	SR 670 (Addington Frame Road)	
Shenandoah	0.27	0.43	US 11 (Lee Highway)	Run Away Lane	Dead End	
Smyth	1.70	2.74	SR 601 (Teas Road)	Sand Mines Road	Dead End	
Southampton	9.40	15.13	SR 743 (Fuller Mills Road)	Cypress Bridge Road Sands Road Rochelle Swamp Road	SR 680	Gap between segments ending at different points along SR 673 Gap between segments ending at different points along SR 672
Spotsylvania	2.00	3.22	SR 610 (Old Plank Road)	Chancellor Road	SR 627 (Gordon Road)	
Stafford	0.17	0.27	SR 218 (White Oak Road)	Glebe Road	Dead End	
Surry	0.18	0.29	SR 40 (Martin Luther King Highway)	Spring Water Drive	Dead End	
Sussex	0.40	0.64	SR 663 (Osborne Road)	Unnamed road	Dead End	
Tazewell	0.03	0.05	SR 16 (Stoney Ridge Road)	Brewster Hollow Road	Dead End	
Warren	0.65	1.05	US 340 (Stonewall Jackson Highway)	Limeton Church Road	SR 737	
Washington	4.70	7.56	SR 670 (Denton Valley Road)	Denton Valley Road	SR 710 (Alvarado Road/Sweet Hollow Road)	Gap between segments ending at different points along the Tennessee state line
Westmoreland	1.84	2.96	Dead End	Bristol Mine Road	SR 634 (Claymont Road)	
Wise	0.33	0.53	Dead End	Blackwood Road	US 23	
Wythe	6.08	9.78	SR 625/SR 690	Unnamed road Ridge Avenue Greever Street Unnamed road	Dead End	
York	0.30	0.48	Dead End	Presson Road	SR 623 (Wildey Road)	
