= Virginia State Route 671 =

State highway in Virginia, United States

State Route 671

Route information
- Maintained by VDOT

Location
- Country: United States
- State: Virginia

Highway system
- Virginia Routes; Interstate; US; Primary; Secondary; Byways; History; HOT lanes

State Route 671 (SR 671) in the U.S. state of Virginia is a secondary route designation applied to multiple discontinuous road segments among the many counties. The list below describes the sections in each county that are designated SR 671.

== List ==
County	Length (mi)	Length (km)	From	Via	To	Notes
Accomack	0.60	0.97	SR 669 (Lee Mont Road)	Hart Road	SR 673 (Airport Road)	
Albemarle	10.30	16.58	SR 614 (Garth Road)	Millington Road Ballards Mill Road Wesley Chapel Road Davis Shop Road	SR 664 (Markwood Road)	
Alleghany	0.35	0.56	Dead End	State Avenue	US 60 Bus	
Amelia	2.38	3.83	Dead End	Pot Rock Lane Jetersville Road	US 360 (Patrick Henry Highway)	
Amherst	4.80	7.72	SR 677 (Dixie Airport Road)	Possum Island Road Bruner Road Unnamed road	US 29 Bus	Gap between segments ending at different points along SR 604
Appomattox	0.65	1.05	SR 721 (Stone Ridge Road)	Turner Mountain Road	Dead End	
Augusta	3.66	5.89	SR 620 (Spotts Woods Road)	Almo Chapel Road	US 11 (Lee Jackson Highway)	
Bath	0.09	0.14	SR 633	Hileman Lane	Dead End	
Bedford	4.53	7.29	SR 644 (Lankford Mill Road)	Centerville Road Timber Ridge Road	SR 715 (Lowry Road)	
Bland	0.42	0.68	SR 606 (Wilderness Road)	Dismal Creek Road	Dead End	
Botetourt	0.50	0.80	SR 696 (Buhrman Road)	McDaniel Drive	Dead End	
Brunswick	2.61	4.20	SR 670 (Western Mill Road)	Penn Drive	SR 611 (Dry Bread Road)	
Buchanan	1.57	2.53	SR 618 (Fox Ridge Drive)	Davis Mountain Road	US 460	Gap between segments ending at different points along the Tazewell County line
Buckingham	8.17	13.15	SR 622 (Sharon Church Road)	Spreading Oak Road Penlan Road	US 15 (James Madison Highway)	
Campbell	0.12	0.19	US 501/SR 24	Courthouse Lane	Dead End	
Caroline	3.27	5.26	SR 738 (Anderson Mill Road)	Chilesburg Road Goose Hill Road	SR 603 (County Line Church Road)	Gap between segments ending at different points along SR 738
Carroll	3.10	4.99	SR 638 (Dugspur Road)	Newmantown Road	SR 624 (Nester School Road)	
Charlotte	7.90	12.71	Prince Edward County line/SR 665	County Line Road	Prince Edward County line/SR 667	
Chesterfield	2.50	4.02	SR 606 (Mount Hermon Road)	Mount Hermon Road County Line Road	US 60	
Clarke	0.45	0.72	Dead End	Battletown Drive	SR 7 Bus	
Craig	0.19	0.31	SR 646	Penns Avenue	SR 644 (Cumberland Avenue)	
Culpeper	1.00	1.61	Dead End	Childress Road	SR 672 (Stones Mill Road)	
Cumberland	0.60	0.97	SR 696 (Bonbrook Road)	Summerset Road	SR 672 (Sports Lake Road)	
Dickenson	3.50	5.63	SR 670 (Lick Creek Road)	Unnamed road	SR 80 (Helen Henderson Highway)	
Dinwiddie	0.40	0.64	Dead End	Brownwall Road	US 1 (Boydton Plank Road)	
Essex	0.40	0.64	Dead End	Church Hill Road	SR 659 (Desha Road)	
Fairfax	3.23	5.20	SR 665 (Fox Mill Road)	Hunt Road Vale Road Stuart Mill Road Birdfoot Lane	SR 673 (Lawyers Road)	
Fauquier	0.13	0.21	SR 759 (Federal Street)	Columbia Street Unnamed road	Dead End	
Floyd	2.10	3.38	SR 612 (Stonewall Road)	Wild Cherry Road McNeil Hill Road	SR 612 (Daniels Run Road)	Gap between segments ending at different points along SR 672
Fluvanna	3.41	5.49	SR 6 (West River Road)	Gold Mine Road Cabel Lane	SR 612 (Winnsville Drive)	
Franklin	4.42	7.11	SR 40 (Franklin Street)	Golden View Road	SR 834 (Brooks Mill Road)	
Frederick	18.11	29.15	West Virginia state line	Woodside Road Cedar Hill Road Green Spring Road Shockeysville Road	SR 692 (Pack Horse Road)	Gap between segments ending at different points along SR 654 Gap between segments ending at different points along SR 691
Giles	3.50	5.63	SR 724 (Old Wolf Creek Road)	Blankenship Mountain Road	SR 724 (Old Wolf Creek Road)	
Gloucester	0.50	0.80	US 17 Bus (Main Street)	Enfield Road	SR 629 (T C Walker Road)	
Goochland	0.12	0.19	Dead End	Athey Road	SR 615 (Forest Grove Road)	
Grayson	1.50	2.41	SR 658 (Comers Rock Road)	Mount Zion Road	SR 611 (Caty Sage Road)	
Greene	0.60	0.97	Dead End	Sam Durrer Road	SR 743 (Advance Mills Road)	
Greensville	3.10	4.99	Dead End	Doodlum Road	SR 619 (Purdy Road)	
Halifax	9.30	14.97	Dead End	News Ferry Trail Jones Ferry Road High View Road Swain Road	SR 57 (Chatham Road)	Gap between segments ending at different points along SR 659 Gap between segments ending at different points along SR 360
Hanover	8.73	14.05	US 33 (Mountain Road)	Scotchtown Road Coatesville Road	SR 738 (Teman Road)	
Henry	1.70	2.74	SR 672 (Bassett Heights Road)	Pine Valley Drive Oakcrest Drive	SR 1222 (Winnfield Road/Oakcrest Circle)	Gap between segments ending at different points along SR 606
Isle of Wight	0.30	0.48	Dead End	Country Way	SR 704 (Todd Battery Park Road)	
James City	0.36	0.58	SR 682 (Neck-O-Land Road)	The Colony Road	SR 618 (Lake Powell Road)	
King and Queen	0.87	1.40	Dead End	Old Millwood Road	SR 641 (Salvia Road)	
King George	0.29	0.47	Dead End	Norton Drive Gordon Drive	Dead End	
King William	0.90	1.45	SR 30 (King William Road)	Mangohick Circle	SR 30 (King William Road)	
Lancaster	0.75	1.21	Dead End	Tomlin Trace	SR 613 (Iberis Road)	
Lee	4.88	7.85	US 58	Unnamed road	SR 667 (Old Nursary Road)	Gap between segments ending at different points along SR 672 Gap between segments ending at different points along SR 676 Gap between segments ending at different points along SR 680
Loudoun	7.55	12.15	SR 9 (Charles Town Pike)	Harpers Ferry Road	US 340 (Jefferson Pike)	Formerly SR 275
Louisa	0.13	0.21	SR 634 (Three Chopt Road)	Church Lane	Dead End	
Lunenburg	4.90	7.89	SR 655 (Plank Road)	Reedy Creek Road	SR 675 (Hardy Road)	
Madison	1.40	2.25	US 15 (James Madison Highway)	Forest Drive	Dead End	
Mathews	0.30	0.48	SR 624 (Store Road)	Safers Road	Dead End	
Mecklenburg	12.65	20.36	SR 47	Country Club Drive Stoney Cross Road Callahan Road	SR 669 (Baskerville Road)	Gap between segments ending at different points along SR 660 Gap between segments ending at different points along SR 675
Middlesex	0.16	0.26	Dead End	Hewitt Street	US 17 Bus	
Montgomery	1.76	2.83	SR 8 (Riner Road)	Five Point Road	Dead End	
Nelson	1.83	2.95	Dead End	Old Stage Road Stage Road	US 29 (Thomas Nelson Highway)	
New Kent	0.36	0.58	Dead End	Augustus Road	SR 603/SR 620	
Northampton	0.90	1.45	SR 663 (Cherrystone Road)	Oakland Farm Road	Dead End	
Northumberland	1.00	1.61	SR 669 (Prentice Creek Road/Kent Point Road)	Kent Point Road	Dead End	
Nottoway	0.75	1.21	Dead End	Almtoca Road	SR 601 (Robertsons Road)	
Orange	2.17	3.49	SR 20 (Constitution Highway)	Village Road Narrow Gauge Road	SR 20 (Constitution Highway)	Gap between US 522 and SR 20
Page	0.64	1.03	SR 668 (Lake Arrowhead Road)	Rosedale Lane	SR 670 (Somers Road)	
Patrick	3.74	6.02	SR 773 (Ararat Highway)	Raven Rock Road	SR 631 (River Road/Doe Run Road)	
Pittsylvania	4.75	7.64	SR 665 (Rockford School Road)	Midway Road	SR 634 (Blue Ridge Drive)	
Prince Edward	9.21	14.82	SR 47 (Thomas Jefferson Highway)	County Line Road	US 15 (Farmville Road)	
Prince George	0.20	0.32	FR-295 (Indian Road)	Indian Road	SR 631 (Lansing Road)	
Prince William	2.00	3.22	SR 646 (Aden Road)	Colvin Lane	SR 611 (Valley View Drive)	
Pulaski	2.00	3.22	SR 670 (Beamers Hollow Road/Lizzie Gunn Road)	Chestnut Ridge Road	Dead End	
Rappahannock	0.20	0.32	US 211 (Lee Highway)	Thorton Gap Church Road	SR 600 (Bryans Road)	
Richmond	0.45	0.72	Dead End	Thrift Road	SR 619 (Rich Neck Road)	
Roanoke	1.12	1.80	US 11 (West Main Street)	Campbell Drive	Dead End	
Rockbridge	4.46	7.18	Dead End	Old Farm Road	Lexington city limits	
Rockingham	4.85	7.81	SR 276 (Cross Keys Road)	Williams Run Road Mill Creek Church Road Shady Grove Road Doe Hill Road	SR 656 (Harper Mill Road)	
Russell	7.60	12.23	US 58 Alt	Unnamed road Honaker Chapel Road Flats Circle	SR 71	Gap between segments ending at different points along SR 678 Gap between segments ending at different points along US 58 Alt
Scott	13.43	21.61	SR 71 (Nicklesville Highway)	Unnamed road Ponderosa Road Valley Creek Road Twin Springs Road	SR 659 (Twin Springs Road/River Bluff Road)	Gap between segments ending at different points along SR 670
Shenandoah	2.22	3.57	Woodstock town limits	Lakeview Drive	Dead End	
Smyth	1.30	2.09	Dead End	Unnamed road	SR 601 (Pugh Mountain Road)	
Southampton	14.72	23.69	SR 35 (Meherrin Road)	General Thomas Highway	US 58 (Southampton Parkway)	
Spotsylvania	0.41	0.66	SR 208 (Courthouse Road)	Rhoads Drive	SR 1031	
Stafford	0.95	1.53	SR 644 (Hill Church Road)	Van Horn Lane	SR 1728 (Lakeview Drive)	
Sussex	0.25	0.40	US 460	Bryan Avenue	SR 676 (Williams Lane)	
Tazewell	1.50	2.41	Buchanan County line	Shorts Road	Buchanan County line	
Warren	0.92	1.48	Dead End	Harmony Orchard Road	SR 604 (Harmony Hollow Road)	
Washington	1.40	2.25	SR 665 (Cleveland Road)	Neal Road	Dead End	
Westmoreland	0.68	1.09	Dead End	Wilson Drive	SR 610 (Tucker Hill Road)	
Wise	10.52	16.93	Kentucky state line	Flat Gap Road North Fork Road South Fork Road	US 23 Bus	
Wythe	2.60	4.18	SR 612 (Dry Road)	Crigger Road Grey Branch Road	SR 670 (Sharons Drive)	
York	0.40	0.64	Dead End	Weston Road	SR 621 (Dare Road)	
