= Virginia State Route 677 =

State highway in Virginia, United States

State Route 677

Route information
- Maintained by VDOT

Location
- Country: United States
- State: Virginia

Highway system
- Virginia Routes; Interstate; US; Primary; Secondary; Byways; History; HOT lanes

State Route 677 (SR 677) in the U.S. state of Virginia is a secondary route designation applied to multiple discontinuous road segments among the many counties. The list below describes the sections in each county that are designated SR 677.

== List ==
County	Length (mi)	Length (km)	From	Via	To	Notes
Accomack	2.40	3.86	US 13 (Lankford Highway)	Whites Neck Road	Dead End	
Albemarle	5.80	9.33	SR 637 (Dick Woods Road)	Bloomfield Road Old Ballard Road	SR 676 (Owensville Road)	Gap between segments ending at different points along US 250
Alleghany	0.24	0.39	Dead End	Parsonage Lane	SR 18 (Potts Creek Road)	
Amelia	0.75	1.21	Dead End	Little Flock Church Road	SR 608 (Little Patrick Road)	
Amherst	3.86	6.21	SR 622 (Galts Mill Road)	Dixie Airport Road	US 29 Bus (Amherst Highway)	
Appomattox	1.14	1.83	SR 26 (Oakville Road)	Log Cabin Road	SR 26 (Oakville Road)	
Augusta	2.20	3.54	SR 602 (Summerdean Road)	Shemariah Road	SR 603 (Cales Springs Road)	
Bath	0.09	0.14	Dead End	McClintic Heights Road	US 220 (Ingalls Boulevard)	
Bedford	1.00	1.61	Dead End	Turkey Mountain Road	SR 43 (Peaks Road)	
Bland	1.30	2.09	SR 608 (Wesendonick Road)	No Business Creek Road	Giles County line	
Botetourt	1.42	2.29	SR 670 (Trinity Road)	Roy Road	SR 676 (Gravel Hill Road)	
Brunswick	0.65	1.05	SR 678 (Railroad Street)	Cedar Grove Road	US 58 Bus	
Buchanan	1.00	1.61	SR 656 (Looneys Creek Road)	Wolfpen Road	Dead End	
Buckingham	3.15	5.07	SR 676 (Ridge Road)	Brooks Hall Road Bransford Road	Dead End	
Campbell	6.30	10.14	SR 738 (English Tavern Road)	Sunnymeade Road Camp Hydaway Road Old Rustburg Road	Lynchburg city limits	Gap between segments ending at different points along SR 670
Caroline	1.80	2.90	SR 30 (Dawn Boulevard)	Camp Road	SR 693 (Herring Creek Road)	
Carroll	3.45	5.55	SR 608/SR 640 (Parkside Drive)	Thunder Ridge Road Crooked Oak Road White Stone Road	Dead End	Gap between segments ending at different points along SR 670 Gap between segments ending at different points along SR 680
Charlotte	1.10	1.77	Dead End	Red Hill Road	SR 619 (Staunton Hill Road)	
Chesterfield	1.84	2.96	US 60 (Midlothian Turnpike)	Old Buckingham Road	SR 147 (Huguenot Road)	
Clarke	0.20	0.32	SR 676 (Donn Lane)	Clarke Lane	Dead End	
Craig	0.20	0.32	SR 646	Scott Avenue	SR 671 (Penns Avenue)	
Culpeper	2.00	3.22	SR 676 (Saint James Church Road/Beverly Ford Road)	Beverly Ford Road	Dead End	
Cumberland	1.00	1.61	Dead End	Brown Branch Road	SR 600 (River Road)	
Dickenson	0.40	0.64	SR 607	Unnamed road	Dead End	
Dinwiddie	0.80	1.29	SR 604 (Halifax Road)	Carson Drive	SR 345 (Richard Bland College)	
Essex	1.05	1.69	SR 606 (Fairfield Lane)	Shady Lane	Dead End	
Fairfax	5.45	8.77	Dead End	Hunter Station Road Meadowlark Road Old Courthouse Road Gallows Road Gallows Branch Road	SR 926 (Kidwell Drive)	Gap between SR 674 and a dead end Gap between segments ending at different points along SR 675 Gap between segments ending at different points along the Vienna town limits
Fauquier	0.30	0.48	FR-185 (Grove Lane)	Oak Hill Road	Dead End	
Floyd	1.90	3.06	Montgomery County line	Dobbins Hollow Road	SR 615 (Christiansburg Pike)	
Fluvanna	0.60	0.97	Dead End	Old Fork Lane	SR 640 (Shores Road)	
Franklin	3.37	5.42	SR 636 (Hardy Road)	Middle Gap Road Idlewood Road	Cul-de-Sac	Gap between segments ending at different points along SR 678
Frederick	2.18	3.51	Dead End	Old Baltimore Road	SR 739 (Apple Pie Ridge Road)	
Giles	1.90	3.06	Bland County line	No Business Creek Road	Dead End	
Gloucester	0.80	1.29	Dead End	Hall Town Road	US 17 (George Washington Memorial Highway)	
Goochland	0.20	0.32	Cul-de-Sac	Bowles Road	SR 605 (Shannon Hill Road)	
Grayson	5.20	8.37	SR 739 (Hazelwood Road)	Razor Ridge Road	SR 601 (Flat Ridge Road)	
Greene	0.34	0.55	US 33 Bus	Ice House Road	US 33 Bus	
Greensville	0.98	1.58	Dead End	Hill Top Lane	SR 632 (Massie Branch Road)	
Halifax	5.60	9.01	Dead End	Wilson Memorial Trail Ridge Road	SR 676 (Thompson Store Road)	Gap between segments ending at different points along SR 360
Hanover	1.70	2.74	SR 611 (Saint Peters Church Road)	Taylors Creek Road	SR 610 (Bethany Church Road)	
Henry	2.87	4.62	Patrick County line	Orchard Drive Hales Fish Pond Road	Dead End	Gap between segments ending at different points along SR 687
Isle of Wight	2.70	4.35	SR 626 (Mill Swamp Road)	Wrenns Mill Road	SR 10 (Old Stage Highway)	
James City	0.07	0.11	SR 143 (Merrimac Trail)	Government Road	York County line	
King and Queen	0.45	0.72	Dead End	Suttons Court	Dead End	
King George	0.29	0.47	SR 3/SR 606	Stanley Road	SR 609 (Comorn Road)	
King William	0.07	0.11	Dead End	Recycle Road	SR 30 (King William Road)	
Lancaster	0.50	0.80	SR 625 (Slabtown Road)	Lovers Lane	Dead End	
Lee	3.30	5.31	SR 669	Unnamed road	SR 667 (Old Nursary Road)	
Loudoun	0.24	0.39	SR 1849 (Preddy Court)	Partlow Road	SR 641 (Ashburn Road)	
Louisa	0.90	1.45	Dead End	Goodwin Store Road	SR 605 (Shannon Hill Road)	
Lunenburg	0.80	1.29	Dead End	Old Chase City Road	SR 622 (Rehoboth Road)	
Madison	0.40	0.64	Dead End	Estes Lane	US 29 (Seminole Trail)	
Mathews	0.66	1.06	SR 611 (Tabernacle Road)	Canoe Yard Trail	SR 609 (Bethel Beach Road)	
Mecklenburg	13.87	22.32	US 58	Wilkerson Road Mount Pleasant Road Eastern Road	SR 675 (Hayes Mill Road)	Gap between segments ending at different points along SR 92 Gap between segments ending at different points along SR 660
Middlesex	0.53	0.85	SR 636 (Timberneck Road)	Honeysuckle Lane	Dead End	
Montgomery	0.50	0.80	Dead End	Currin Lane	SR 658 (Meadow Creek Road)	
Nelson	1.00	1.61	SR 676 (Clay Pool Road)	Hare Wood Lane	Dead End	
New Kent	0.56	0.90	SR 618 (Olivet Church Road)	Piney Branch Road	Dead End	
Northampton	1.86	2.99	SR 685 (Deagonal Street)	Prettyman Circle	SR 613	Gap between segments ending at different points along SR 613
Northumberland	0.60	0.97	Begin Loop	Fleeton Point Circle	SR 657 (Sunny Bank Road)	
Nottoway	0.55	0.89	Dead End	Miller Mill Road	SR 624 (Cary Shop Road)	
Orange	1.71	2.75	SR 612 (Monrovia Road)	Piney Woods Road	SR 630 (Matthews Mill Road)	
Page	0.40	0.64	SR 676 (Creekside Drive)	Eden Road	SR 667 (Dry Run Road)	
Patrick	9.47	15.24	Carroll County line	Willis Gap Road	North Carolina state line	
Pittsylvania	3.70	5.95	Dead End	White Fall Road	SR 667 (Hermosa Road)	
Powhatan	1.55	2.49	US 60 (James Anderson Highway)	Batterson Road	US 60 (James Anderson Highway)	
Prince Edward	0.70	1.13	Dead End	Brown Town Road	SR 608 (Prospect Road)	
Prince George	0.24	0.39	SR 622 (Fairwood Road)	Carson Drive	Cul-de-Sac	
Prince William	2.60	4.18	SR 234 (Sudley Road)	Aldie Road	Dead End	
Pulaski	0.10	0.16	SR 600 (Belspring Road)	Guthrie Road	Dead End	
Rappahannock	0.14	0.23	US 522 (Zachary Taylor Avenue)	Mountain View Road	Dead End	
Richmond	0.30	0.48	Dead End	Moores Mill Road	SR 607 (Canal Road)	
Roanoke	2.40	3.86	Dead End	Spotswood Drive Willow Branch Road	Dead End	
Rockbridge	2.17	3.49	Dead End	Unnamed road	SR 251	Gap between segments ending at different points along SR 612
Rockingham	1.60	2.57	SR 678 (Beards Ford Road/Scotts Ford Road)	Scotts Ford Road	Dead End	
Russell	0.70	1.13	SR 676 (Clinch Mountain Road)	Cedar Grove Road	SR 613 (Moccasin Valley Road)	
Scott	4.00	6.44	SR 660 (Obeys Creek Road)	Luray Road	SR 680 (Hickory Corners Lane)	
Shenandoah	0.35	0.56	SR 604 (Fairview Road)	Baker House Lane	Dead End	
Smyth	1.30	2.09	SR 675 (Cave Ridge Road)	Unnamed road	SR 612	
Southampton	2.40	3.86	SR 673 (Statesville Road)	Barns Church Road	SR 673 (Statesville Road)	
Spotsylvania	0.23	0.37	Dead End	Wallace Lane	US 1 (Jefferson Davis Highway)	
Stafford	0.95	1.53	Cul-de-Sac	Mount Hope Church Road	SR 608 (Brooke Road)	
Sussex	0.20	0.32	SR 705	Branch Street	US 460	
Tazewell	0.35	0.56	Bluefield town limits	Unnamed road	Dead End	
Warren	2.17	3.49	SR 619 (Rivermont Drive)	Catlett Mountain Road	SR 679	
Washington	6.31	10.15	SR 75 (Green Spring Road)	Watauga Road	US 11 (Lee Highway)	
Westmoreland	0.40	0.64	Richmond County line	Ephesus Church Road	SR 625 (Horners Mill Road)	
Wythe	3.20	5.15	SR 670	Unnamed road	SR 674 (Ridge Aux Road)	Gap between segments ending at different points along SR 749
York	0.41	0.66	James City County line	Government Road	SR 641 (Penniman Road)	
