= Virginia State Route 675 =

State highway in Virginia, United States

State Route 675

Route information
- Maintained by VDOT

Location
- Country: United States
- State: Virginia

Highway system
- Virginia Routes; Interstate; US; Primary; Secondary; Byways; History; HOT lanes

State Route 675 (SR 675) in the U.S. state of Virginia is a secondary route designation applied to multiple discontinuous road segments among the many counties. The list below describes the sections in each county that are designated SR 675.

== List ==
| County | Length (mi) | Length (km) | From | Via | To | Notes |
|---|---|---|---|---|---|---|
| Accomack | 3.70 | 5.95 | SR 669 (Hopkins Road) | Justisville Road Saint Thomas Road Ewell Road | Dead End | Gap between segments ending at different points along SR 674 |
| Albemarle | 2.70 | 4.35 | Dead End | Lake Albemarle Road | SR 614 (Garth Road) | |
| Alleghany | 0.85 | 1.37 | SR 675 (White Oak Drive) | White Oak Drive | US 60 (Midland Trail) | Road forms a loop on itself |
| Amelia | 0.80 | 1.29 | SR 619 (Bunker Hill Road) | Richard Lane | Dead End | |
| Amherst | 5.81 | 9.35 | Dead End | Phyllis Lea Drive Unnamed road Winesap Road North Vail Drive | Dead End | Gap between segments ending at different points along SR 652 |
| Appomattox | 3.50 | 5.63 | SR 644 (Cub Creek Lane) | Cedar Bend Road | SR 630 (Old Evergreen Road) | |
| Augusta | 6.50 | 10.46 | SR 693 (Butler Road) | McKamy Springs Road Callison Mill Road Broadhead School Road | US 11 (Lee Jackson Highway) | Gap between segments ending at different points along SR 726 Gap between segments ending at different points along SR 670 Gap between segments ending at different points along SR 604 |
| Bath | 0.39 | 0.63 | SR 662 (Edgewood Lane) | Bee Town Road | SR 620 (West Warm Springs Drive) | |
| Bedford | 4.40 | 7.08 | Dead End | Swanbrooke Drive Keytown Road Lizard Ridge Road | SR 644 (Lankford Mill Road) | |
| Botetourt | 1.19 | 1.92 | SR 779 (Catawba Road) | Glebe Road | US 220 (Roanoke Road) | |
| Brunswick | 4.69 | 7.55 | SR 670 (Western Mill Road) | Brandy Creek Road | SR 611 (Dry Bread Road) | |
| Buchanan | 1.70 | 2.74 | Dead End | Brushey Fork Road | SR 651 (Left Fork Lesters Road) | |
| Buckingham | 2.13 | 3.43 | SR 715 (Circle Drive Road) | Arvon Road | SR 673 (Virginia Mill Road) | |
| Campbell | 0.44 | 0.71 | SR 683 (Lawyers Road) | Doe Run Lane | Dead End | |
| Caroline | 1.43 | 2.30 | US 17 (Tidewater Trail) | Hazelwood Lane | Dead End | |
| Carroll | 3.90 | 6.28 | SR 702 (Stable Road) | Sunnyside Road Westover Road Chaparal Road | SR 666 (Bent Nail Road) | Gap between segments ending at different points along US 52 |
| Charles City | 0.21 | 0.34 | Cul-de-Sac | Collins Run Parkway | SR 610 (Green Oak Road) | |
| Charlotte | 2.27 | 3.65 | SR 617 (Bethel Road) | Tola ROad | SR 40/SR 1001 | |
| Chesterfield | 2.15 | 3.46 | SR 147 (Huguenot Road) | Robious Road | US 60 (Midlothian Turnpike) | |
| Clarke | 0.59 | 0.95 | SR 632 (Crums Church Road) | Garden Road | SR 632 (Crums Church Road) | |
| Craig | 0.13 | 0.21 | Dead End | Walnut Tree Lane | SR 630 | |
| Culpeper | 3.20 | 5.15 | SR 669 (Carrico Mills Road) | Thoms Road Haughts Lane | SR 674 (Kellys Ford Road) | Gap between segments ending at different points along SR 673 |
| Cumberland | 1.70 | 2.74 | Dead End | Crowder Road | SR 638 (Guinea Road) | |
| Dickenson | 0.96 | 1.54 | Dead End | Palmer Street Adams Street | SR 782 (Lytton Circle) | |
| Dinwiddie | 5.58 | 8.98 | SR 670 (Duncan Road) | Vaughan Road | Petersburg city limits | |
| Essex | 1.00 | 1.61 | SR 639 (Walnut Shade Road) | Carpenter Rest Road | Dead End | |
| Fairfax | 8.27 | 13.31 | Herndon town limits | Sunset Hills Road Crowell Road Brown Mill Road Beulah Road Park Street | SR 698 (Cedar Lane) | Gap between segments ending at different points along SR 674 Gap between segments ending at different points along the Vienna town limits |
| Fauquier | 1.51 | 2.43 | Cul-de-Sac | Kelly Road | SR 600 (Broad Run Church Road) | |
| Floyd | 0.55 | 0.89 | SR 676 (Hale Road) | Cana Road | Dead End | |
| Fluvanna | 0.55 | 0.89 | SR 6 (Main Street) | Canal Street Old Drivers Hill Road | SR 6 (West River Road) | Gap between dead ends |
| Franklin | 0.66 | 1.06 | SR 653 (Ellis Road) | Juniper Road | Dead End | |
| Frederick | 0.17 | 0.27 | Warren County line | Foster Hollow Road | SR 639 (East Refuge Church Road) | |
| Giles | 0.20 | 0.32 | SR 61 (Wolf Creek Road) | Chaney Road | SR 724 (Old Wolf Creek Road) | |
| Gloucester | 0.17 | 0.27 | SR 621 (Warehouse Road) | Fary Drive | Dead End | |
| Goochland | 0.35 | 0.56 | SR 6 (River Road) | Ransone Road | SR 6 (River Road) | |
| Grayson | 7.90 | 12.71 | SR 601 (Flat Ridge Road) | Panther Creek Road Glen Wood Road Panther Creek Road | SR 672 (Blue Spring Road/Roberts Cove Road) | |
| Greene | 0.50 | 0.80 | SR 622 (Celt Road) | Southard Road | Dead End | |
| Greensville | 0.88 | 1.42 | SR 627 (Brink Road) | Hunts Lane | Dead End | |
| Halifax | 6.60 | 10.62 | Pittsylvania County line | Ridgeway Road Adams Trail | Dead End | |
| Hanover | 1.90 | 3.06 | SR 670 (Stone Horse Creek Road) | Auburn Mill Road | SR 611 (Saint Peters Church Road) | |
| Henry | 1.20 | 1.93 | SR 779 (Crestview Drive) | Springhouse Lane Cope Craig Road | Dead End | |
| Isle of Wight | 0.70 | 1.13 | SR 10 (Old Stage Road) | Holly Point Way | Dead End | |
| James City | 0.33 | 0.53 | US 60 (Pocahontas Trail) | Grove Heights Avenue | SR 656 (Woodside Drive) | |
| King and Queen | 0.32 | 0.51 | Dead End | North Bank Road | SR 633 (Bendley Lane) | |
| King George | 0.20 | 0.32 | SR 715 (Norton Drive) | Williams Creek Road | Dead End | |
| King William | 0.21 | 0.34 | SR 604 (Dabneys Mill Road) | Corinth Drive | SR 676 (Hill Drive) | |
| Lancaster | 4.14 | 6.66 | Dead End | Black Stump Road | SR 688 (James B Jones Memorial Highway) | |
| Lee | 0.60 | 0.97 | SR 672 | Unnamed road | SR 674 | |
| Loudoun | 1.45 | 2.33 | SR 673 (Evan Road) | Fry Farm Road Church Street | SR 287 (Berlin Turnpike) | |
| Louisa | 1.10 | 1.77 | SR 615 (Mahanes Road) | Lindsay Road | SR 22 (Louisa Road) | |
| Lunenburg | 4.50 | 7.24 | Dead End | Hardy Road Trinity Road | SR 49 | |
| Madison | 1.20 | 1.93 | Greene County line | Fletcher Road | Dead End | |
| Mathews | 0.40 | 0.64 | SR 660 | Sandberg Lane | Dead End | |
| Mecklenburg | 6.60 | 10.62 | US 58 | Hayes Mill Road | SR 670 (Hutcheson Road) | |
| Middlesex | 0.05 | 0.08 | SR 33 (General Puller Highway) | New Street | SR 674 (Bowden Street) | |
| Montgomery | 9.50 | 15.29 | SR 8 (Riner Road) | Smith Creek Road Split Rail Road) | SR 639 (Mount Pleasant Road) | Gap between segments ending at different points along SR 615 Gap between segments ending at different points along SR 674 Gap between dead ends |
| Nelson | 2.20 | 3.54 | SR 674 (Rose Mill Road) | Shady Lane Firehouse Road | SR 778 (Lowesville Road) | |
| New Kent | 0.32 | 0.51 | SR 1230 (Blackcreek Road) | Arrowhead Road | SR 613 (Dispatch Road) | |
| Northampton | 0.20 | 0.32 | SR 636 (Mount Hebron Road) | Press Lane | Dead End | |
| Northumberland | 0.20 | 0.32 | SR 621 (Mundy Point Road) | Locust Lane | SR 202 (Hampton Hall Road) | |
| Nottoway | 1.20 | 1.93 | SR 49 (The Falls Road) | Lewis Cole Road | Dead End | |
| Orange | 0.40 | 0.64 | Dead End | Dolley Madison Road | SR 20 (Constitution Highway) | |
| Page | 7.25 | 11.67 | Luray town limits | Bixlers Ferry Road Egypt Bend Road Fort Valley Road | Shenandoah County line | |
| Patrick | 6.57 | 10.57 | SR 677 (County Line Road) | Old Schoolhouse Road Friends Mission Road | SR 773 (Ararat Highway) | |
| Pittsylvania | 1.55 | 2.49 | Halifax County line | Peytonsburg Road Redd Lane | Dead End | Gap between segments ending at different points along SR 57 |
| Powhatan | 2.80 | 4.51 | US 60 (James Anderson Highway) | Page Road | US 60 (Midlothian Turnpike/James Anderson Highway) | |
| Prince Edward | 1.57 | 2.53 | Dead End | Dry Bridge Road | SR 695 (Tuggle Road) | |
| Prince George | 0.11 | 0.18 | SR 631 (Lansing Road) | Lampe Lane | US 301 (Crater Road) | |
| Prince William | 3.00 | 4.83 | SR 215 (Vint Hill Road) | Glenkirk Road | SR 619 (Linton Hall Road) | |
| Pulaski | 0.80 | 1.29 | SR 693 (Julia Simpkins Road) | Little Irish Road | Dead End | |
| Rappahannock | 0.45 | 0.72 | US 211 (Lee Highway) | Old Massies Corner Road | US 211 (Lee Highway) | |
| Richmond | 0.61 | 0.98 | Dead End | Elliots Drive | SR 636 (Strangeway Road) | |
| Roanoke | 0.92 | 1.48 | SR 652 (Enchanted Lane) | Indian Grave Road Clearbrook Village Lane | SR 674 (Clearbrook Lane) | |
| Rockbridge | 3.12 | 5.02 | Dead End | Unnamed road | SR 674 | Gap between segments ending at different points along SR 251 |
| Rockingham | 0.08 | 0.13 | US 11 (Lee Highway) | Spring Valley Circle | Cul-de-Sac | |
| Russell | 0.14 | 0.23 | US 58 Alt | Hawkins Mill Lane | Dead End | |
| Scott | 5.72 | 9.21 | SR 72 (Veterans Memorial Highway) | Midway Road Unnamed road | SR 677 (Luray Road) | |
| Shenandoah | 20.80 | 33.47 | West Virginia state line | Wolf Gap Road Stoney Creek Road Picadilly Street Fort Road Edinburg Gap Road Camp Roosevelt Road | Page County line | Gap between segments ending at different points along SR 42 Gap between dead ends at a railroad track Gap between SR 185 and US 11 |
| Smyth | 10.55 | 16.98 | SR 674 (Sand Mines Road) | Worley Ranch Road Cave Ridge Road | SR 614 (Cedar Springs Road) | |
| Southampton | 2.10 | 3.38 | SR 658 (Cedar View Road) | Greenhead Road | SR 731 (Ridley Road) | |
| Spotsylvania | 1.08 | 1.74 | SR 3 (Plank Road) | Five Mile Road | Dead End | |
| Stafford | 1.23 | 1.98 | SR 610 (Garrisonville Road) | Toluca Road | Cul-de-Sac | |
| Sussex | 1.50 | 2.41 | SR 735 (Courthouse Road) | Champion Road | Dead End | |
| Tazewell | 2.00 | 3.22 | SR 607 (Little Tumbling Creek Road) | Little Valley Road | Dead End | |
| Warren | 0.25 | 0.40 | US 522 (Winchester Road) | Success Road | Cul-de-Sac | |
| Washington | 3.59 | 5.78 | SR 677 (Watauga Road) | Good Hope Road Cornelius Drive | Dead End | |
| Westmoreland | 0.84 | 1.35 | Dead End | Mount Pleasant Road | SR 612 (Coles Point Road) | |
| Wise | 0.20 | 0.32 | SR 790 (West Norton Road) | Unnamed road | SR 610 | |
| Wythe | 4.43 | 7.13 | Dead End | Allis Chalmer Road Chinquapin Avenue Buck Avenue Buck Street Unnamed road | SR 699 | |
| York | 0.59 | 0.95 | Cul-de-Sac | Mansion Road | SR 782 (Carys Chapel Road) | |
