= Dumfries Road =

Dumfries Road is the name of multiple highways:

== Ontario ==
- Waterloo Regional Road 47, named Dumfries Road

== Virginia ==
- Virginia State Route 234, named Dumfries Road from Prince William Parkway to U.S. Route 1
- Virginia State Route 234 Business, named Dumfries Road from Wellington Road to Prince William Parkway
- Virginia State Route 605 (Fauquier and Prince William Counties), named Dumfries Road in Fauquier County
- Virginia State Route 606, named Dumfries Road in Fauquier County
- Virginia State Route 667, named Old Dumfries Road in Fauquier County
