= Virginia State Route 676 =

State highway in Virginia, United States

State Route 676

Route information
- Maintained by VDOT

Location
- Country: United States
- State: Virginia

Highway system
- Virginia Routes; Interstate; US; Primary; Secondary; Byways; History; HOT lanes

State Route 676 (SR 676) in the U.S. state of Virginia is a secondary route designation applied to multiple discontinuous road segments among the many counties. The list below describes the sections in each county that are designated SR 676.

== List ==
County	Length (mi)	Length (km)	From	Via	To	Notes
Accomack	6.07	9.77	Dead End	Youngs Creek Road Clam Road Matthews Road Dennis Drive Muttonhunk Road	SR 679 (Metompkin Road)	Gap between segments ending at different points along SR 675 Gap between segments ending at different points along SR 658 Gap between segments ending at different points along SR 316
Albemarle	10.50	16.90	SR 738 (Morgantown Road)	Tilman Road Owensville Road Garth Road Woodlands Road	SR 743 (Earlysville Road)	Gap between segments ending at different points along SR 678 Gap between segments ending at different points along SR 601
Alleghany	0.25	0.40	SR 625 (East Dolly Ann Drive)	Unnamed road	Dead End	
Amelia	0.35	0.56	SR 643 (Bent Creek Road)	Wilkerson Lane	Dead End	
Amherst	2.29	3.69	Dead End	Johns Creek Road Grahams Creek Road	Dead End	
Appomattox	0.60	0.97	SR 630	Friendship Lane	Dead End	
Augusta	1.00	1.61	SR 726 (Dutch Hollow Road)	Benson Hollow Road	SR 670 (Cherry Grove Road)	
Bath	0.35	0.56	SR 39 (Mountain Valley Road)	Gatewood Drive	SR 39 (Mountain Valley Road)	
Bedford	0.90	1.45	SR 675 (Lizard Ridge Road)	Crosscreek Road	Dead End	
Bland	0.25	0.40	Dead End	Eagles Road	US 52 (Clear Fork Creek Highway)	
Botetourt	3.56	5.73	SR 670 (Trinity Road)	Parsons Road Gravel Hill Road	US 220 (Roanoke Road)	
Brunswick	1.80	2.90	SR 611 (Dry Bread Road)	Pairs Drive	SR 675 (Brandy Creek Road)	
Buchanan	2.06	3.32	Dead End	Race Fork Road	SR 643 (Hurley Road)	
Buckingham	10.20	16.42	SR 617 (Staunton Town Road/Copper Mine Road)	Ridge Road	SR 652 (Bridgeport Road)	
Campbell	0.30	0.48	SR 600 (Sugar Hill Road)	Partridge Lane	Charlotte County line	
Caroline	2.21	3.56	SR 207 (Rogers Clark Boulevard)	Devils Three Jump Road	SR 722 (Nelson Hill Road/Colonial Road)	
Carroll	0.73	1.17	SR 926 (Madison Road)	Bluestone Road	SR 675 (Westover Road)	
Charlotte	1.10	1.77	SR 675 (Tola Road)	Poor House Road	Dead End	
Chesterfield	0.60	0.97	Dead End	Vest Road	SR 602 (River Road)	
Clarke	0.09	0.14	SR 677 (Clarke Lane)	Donn Lane	SR 615 (Boom Road)	
Craig	0.20	0.32	SR 615 (Craigs Creek Road)	Unnamed road	Dead End	
Culpeper	4.13	6.65	SR 675 (Thoms Road)	Berry Hill Road Beverly Ford Road Saint James Church Road	Dead End	
Cumberland	2.75	4.43	SR 45 (Cumberland Road)	Asai Road	Dead End	
Dickenson	1.80	2.90	Dead End	Unnamed road	SR 652/SR 661	
Dinwiddie	0.80	1.29	SR 613 (Squirrel Level Road)	Flank Road	SR 675 (Vaughan Road)	
Essex	0.25	0.40	SR 620 (Cheatwood Mill Road/Lewis Level Road)	Lewis Level Road	Dead End	
Fairfax	4.91	7.90	Dead End	Clarks Crossing Road Trap Road Towlston Road	SR 193 (Georgetown Pike)	Gap between segments ending at different points along SR 675 Gap between segments ending at different points along SR 7
Fauquier	3.22	5.18	SR 605 (Dumfries Road)	Riley Road	US 29 (Lee Highway)	
Floyd	2.80	4.51	SR 673 (Coles Knob Road)	Hale Road	SR 612 (Daniels Run Road)	Gap between segments ending at different points along SR 608
Fluvanna	3.05	4.91	SR 633 (North Boston Road)	Oliver Creek Road Diamond Road	Louisa County line	
Franklin	3.67	5.91	SR 678 (Northridge Road/Keffer Road)	Northridge Road Hardy Road	SR 634 (Hardy Road/Eton Road)	Gap between segments ending at different points along SR 636
Frederick	1.70	2.74	SR 677 (Old Baltimore Road)	Warm Springs Road	SR 671 (Green Spring Road)	
Giles	1.20	1.93	Dead End	Conley Hollow Road	SR 724 (Old Wolf Creek Road)	
Gloucester	1.20	1.93	SR 3 (John Clayton Memorial Highway)	Burgh Westra Lane	Dead End	
Goochland	4.66	7.50	SR 6 (River Road)	Hermitage Road	SR 621 (Manakin Road)	
Grayson	5.40	8.69	SR 677 (Razor Ridge Road)	Chestnut Ridge Road Glenwood Road	SR 675 (Glen Wood Road)	Gap between segments ending at different points along SR 601
Greene	2.20	3.54	SR 628 (Simmons Gap Road)	Shifflett Road	SR 632 (Wyatt Mountain Road)	
Greensville	2.21	3.56	SR 660 (Fiddlers Road)	Brantley Moore Road	SR 629 (Zion Church Road)	
Halifax	7.24	11.65	SR 360 (Mountain Road)	Thompson Store Road Ashbury Church Road	SR 57 (Chatham Road)	
Hanover	1.85	2.98	SR 620 (Dogwood Trail Road)	Vontay Road	SR 611 (Dunns Chapel Road/Saint Peters Church Road)	
Henry	3.46	5.57	SR 698 (Crestridge Road)	Willie Craig Road	SR 653 (Mount Herman Church Road)	
Isle of Wight	1.66	2.67	SR 10 (Old Stage Highway)	Fort Huger Drive	Dead End	
James City	0.34	0.55	Dead End	Farmville Lane	SR 636 (Peach Street)	
King and Queen	0.26	0.42	Dead End	Goulders Creek Road	SR 33 (Lewis Puller Memorial Highway)	
King George	0.30	0.48	SR 3 (Kings Highway)	Rectory Lane	Dead End	
King William	0.39	0.63	SR 604 (Dabneys Mill Road)	Hill Drive	SR 675 (Corinth Drive)	
Lancaster	0.29	0.47	Dead End	Squires Road	SR 647 (Bald Eagle Road)	
Lee	11.02	17.73	SR 683	Lamb Hollow Road	SR 660 (Hardeys Creek Road)	Gap between segments ending at different points along SR 682 Gap between segments ending at different points along SR 671 Gap between segments ending at different points along SR 667 Gap between segments ending at different points along SR 664
Loudoun	1.40	2.25	SR 680 (Axline Road)	Lutheran Church Road Everhart Road	Dead End	
Louisa	0.20	0.32	Fluvanna County line	Diamond Road	SR 627 (Zion Road)	
Lunenburg	0.90	1.45	SR 622 (Rehoboth Road)	Arrington Road	Dead End	
Madison	0.20	0.32	SR 662 (Graves Mill Road)	General Banks Lane	Dead End	
Mathews	0.35	0.56	Dead End	Traders Road Lillies Lane	SR 639 (Crab Neck Road)	
Mecklenburg	0.90	1.45	Dead End	Cross Road	Dead End	
Middlesex	2.27	3.65	SR 602 (Old Virginia Street)	Remlik Road	Dead End	
Montgomery	0.90	1.45	Dead End	Rosemary Road	SR 674 (Craigs Mountain Road)	
Nelson	3.51	5.65	SR 778 (Lowesville Road)	Clay Pool Road	SR 151 (Patrick Henry Highway)	
New Kent	1.12	1.80	SR 612 (Airport Road/Terminal Road)	Ashland Farm Road	FR-118	
Northampton	0.60	0.97	Dead End	Sturgis House Drive	SR 183 (Occohannock Neck Road)	
Northumberland	0.50	0.80	Dead End	Logan Lodge Road	SR 669 (Bluff Point Road)	
Nottoway	0.11	0.18	SR 638 (Plum Street)	Fourth Street	SR 674 (Simmons Street)	
Orange	0.70	1.13	SR 609 (Scuffletown Road)	Stegara Road	Dead End	
Page	0.50	0.80	SR 677 (Eden Road)	Creekside Drive	SR 667 (Dry Run Road)	
Patrick	3.87	6.23	SR 672 (Johnson Creek Road)	Ahart Ridge Road	SR 675 (Old Schoolhouse Road)	
Pittsylvania	3.90	6.28	SR 689 (Strader Road)	Taylors Mill Road	US 29 Bus	
Powhatan	1.44	2.32	US 60 (James Anderson Highway)	Urbine Road	Stavemill Road	
Prince Edward	0.50	0.80	Cul-de-Sac	Lake Drive	SR 642 (Germantown Road)	
Prince George	0.21	0.34	SR 670 (Rowanty Court)	Carson Ruritan Road	Dead End	
Prince William	5.06	8.14	SR 55 (John Marshall Highway)	Catharpin Road	SR 234 (Sudley Road)	
Pulaski	0.99	1.59	SR 798 (Falling Branch Road)	Church Street	Dead End	
Rappahannock	0.10	0.16	End of State Maintenance	Gore Road	SR 729 (Richmond Road)	
Richmond	0.98	1.58	SR 624 (Newland Road)	Reisingers Road	Dead End	
Roanoke	3.15	5.07	SR 615 (Starlight Lane)	Back Creek Road	US 220 (Franklin Road)	
Rockbridge	2.60	4.18	SR 251	Toad Run Road	SR 672 (Enfield Road)	
Rockingham	3.00	4.83	SR 276 (Cross Keys Road)	Oak Shade Road Charlie Town Road	SR 253 (Port Republic Road)	Gap between segments ending at different points along SR 708
Russell	8.00	12.87	SR 613 (Moccasin Valley Road)	Clinch Mountain Road	US 19	
Scott	3.10	4.99	SR 675 (Midway Road)	Blairs Store Road Deerfield Road	SR 661 (Alley Valley Road)	Gap between segments ending at different points along SR 660
Shenandoah	5.28	8.50	SR 681 (Osceola Road)	Unnamed road Fravel Road Unnamed road	Dead End	Gap between segments ending at different points along SR 623 Gap between segments ending at different points along SR 604
Smyth	4.10	6.60	SR 16 (Sugar Grove Highway)	Flat Ridge Road Horne Hollow Road	SR 614 (Cedar Springs Road)	Gap between segments ending at different points along SR 601 Gap between segments ending at different points along SR 675
Southampton	0.44	0.71	Dead End	Southampton Parkway	SR 714 (Preston Street)	
Spotsylvania	0.90	1.45	SR 613 (Brock Road)	Cookstown Road	Dead End	
Stafford	1.12	1.80	US 1 (Jefferson Davis Highway)	Cranes Corner Road	Cul-de-Sac	
Sussex	0.20	0.32	SR 671 (Bryan Avenue)	Williams Lane	SR 31 (Main Street)	
Tazewell	1.50	2.41	SR 637 (Dry Fork Road)	Back Hollow Road	Dead End	
Warren	0.30	0.48	SR 677 (Catlett Mountain Road)	Corron Drive	Dead End	
Washington	3.18	5.12	SR 670 (Denton Valley Road)	Azure Lane Browning Road	Dead End	
Westmoreland	0.42	0.68	SR 645 (Zacata Road)	Poor Jack Road	Dead End	
Wise	1.20	1.93	US 58 Alt	Unnamed road	Dead End	
Wythe	1.10	1.77	SR 616 (Murphyville Road)	Lake Mount Airy Road	US 11 (Lee Highway)	
York	0.66	1.06	SR 238 (Washington Road)	Moore House Road	Cul-de-Sac	
