= Virginia State Route 605 (Fauquier and Prince William Counties) =

Highway in Virginia

State Route 605

Route information
- Maintained by VDOT
- Length: 12.54 mi (20.18 km)

Major junctions
- North end: SR 628 (Blantyre Road) near Bethel
- US 15 / US 29 (Lee Highway) near Warrenton; SR 676 (Riley Road) near Vint Hill Farms; SR 602 (Rogues Road) near Vint Hill Farms; SR 603 (Greenwich Road) near Saint Stephens
- South end: VA 28 (Nokesville Road) near Nokesville

Location
- Country: United States
- State: Virginia

Highway system
- Virginia Routes; Interstate; US; Primary; Secondary; Byways; History; HOT lanes

State Route 605 (SR 605) in Fauquier and Prince William Counties, Virginia, United States is a 12.54 mi (20.18 km) secondary state highway from north of Warrenton near Bethel to southeast of Nokesville. From U.S. 15/U.S. 29 to its eastern terminus at VA 28, SR 605 serves as major artery serving traffic travelling between Warrenton and Nokesville, Manassas, and Dumfries. The entire route is two-lane and is located in rural or semi-rural areas, passing through farmland, woodland, and rural communities.

The segment of SR 605 west of U.S. 29 is known as Airlie Road, with a very short section of the route called Colonial Drive before intersection the U.S. highway. A signification portion of the route is named Dumfries Road, which runs east from U.S. 29 before it enters Prince William County as Fauquier Drive very briefly and terminates at VA 28.

== Route description ==
SR 605 begins at State Route 628 (Blantyre Road) near Bethel in Fauquier County as Airlie Road and heads southeast towards the unincorporated community of Airlie then bends around the Airlie Airport. From there on the road continues southeast and briefly transitions to Colonial Drive and intersects the concurrent U.S. Routes 15 and 29 (Lee Highway) near Warrenton where the route becomes Dumfries Road, the longest segment of State Route 605. The road continues east into rural estate land before bending southeast again and passing through two signalized T-intersections with State Route 676 (Riley Road) and then State Route 602 (Rogues Road), both of which head northeast to Vint Hill Farms towards State Route 215 (Vint Hill Road). Continuing through Fauquier County, the route passes the Dumfries Market convenience store with a Citgo gas station, the sole retail area along the entire route, and continues curving around forests and farmland eastward. State Route 605 finally transitions into Fauquier Drive once entering Prince William County, short after intersects State Route 657 (Reid Lane), and then terminates at State Route 28 (Nokesville Road), south of the community of Nokesville.

== Major intersections ==
County	Location	mi	km	Destinations	Notes
Fauquier		0.00	0.00	SR 628 (Blantyre Road)	Western terminus
Fauquier		1.18	1.90	Airlie Airport	
Fauquier		1.94	3.12	SR 672 (Blackwell Road)	Staggered junction
Fauquier		2.98	4.80	SR 861 (Airlie Road)	Route becomes Colonial Drive
Fauquier		3.19	5.13	Warrenton Park and Ride	
Fauquier		3.29	5.29	US 15 / US 29 (Lee Highway)	Route becomes Dumfries Road
Fauquier		4.02	6.47	SR 674 (Atlee Road)	
Fauquier		4.57	7.35	SR 674 (Grays Mill Road)	
Fauquier		5.62	9.04	SR 1312 (Auburn Mill Road)	
Fauquier		5.95	9.58	SR 676 (Riley Road)	
Fauquier		7.10	11.43	SR 602 (Rogues Road)	
Fauquier		7.90	12.71	SR 670 (Taylor Road)	
Fauquier		9.39	15.11	SR 603 (Greenwich Road)	
Fauquier		11.17	17.98	SR 604 (Burkwell Road)	
Fauquier–Prince William county line		11.76	18.93		Route becomes Fauquier Drive
Prince William		11.88	19.12	SR 657 (Reid Lane)	
Prince William		12.54	20.18	SR 28 (Nokesville Road)	Eastern terminus
1.000 mi = 1.609 km; 1.000 km = 0.621 mi

== Future ==
A roundabout is planned to be constructed at the crossroads Dumfries Road (SR 605) and Greenwich Road (SR 603), replacing a standard 4-way intersection controlled by stop signs on SR 603.
