= Virginia State Route 618 =

State highway in Virginia, United States

State Route 618

Route information
- Maintained by VDOT

Location
- Country: United States
- State: Virginia

Highway system
- Virginia Routes; Interstate; US; Primary; Secondary; Byways; History; HOT lanes

State Route 618 (SR 618) in the U.S. state of Virginia is a secondary route designation applied to multiple discontinuous road segments in the many counties. The list below describes the sections in each county that are designated SR 618.

== List ==
County	Length (mi)	Length (km)	From	Via	To	Notes
Accomack	1.15	1.85	SR 617 (Pennyville Road)	Quail Lane	SR 178 (Boston Road)	
Albemarle	11.22	18.06	SR 795 (Blenheim Road)	Jefferson Mill Road Martin King Road	Fluvanna County Line	
Alleghany	2.30	3.70	SR 617 (Jamison Mountain Road)	Upper Rich Patch Drive	SR 616	
Amelia	3.45	5.55	Prince Edward County Line	James Town Road	SR 616 (Genito Road)	
Amherst	0.40	0.64	SR 130 (Elon Road)	Mount Tabor Road	Dead End	
Appomattox	9.15	14.73	SR 627 (Hixburg Road)	Hollywood Road	SR 24 (Old Courthouse Road)	
Augusta	0.70	1.13	Dead End	Paradise Lane	SR 731 (Emmanuel Church Road)	
Bath	4.30	6.92	SR 687 (Jackson River Turnpike)	Cales Springs Road	US 220 (Ingalls Boulevard)	
Bedford	0.20	0.32	SR 24 (Stewartsville Road)	Parkway Lane	Dead End	
Bland	1.20	1.93	SR 615 (Suiter Road)	Lodge Drive	Dead End	
Botetourt	8.09	13.02	Bedford County Line	McFalls Creek Road Chestnut Run Road Middle Creek Road	SR 614 (Jennings Creek Road)	Gap between segments ending at different points along SR 614
Brunswick	4.10	6.60	Lunenburg County Line	Eanes Road Woodsdale Drive	SR 644 (Brunswick Drive)	
Buchanan	4.62	7.44	Tazewell County Line	Fox Ridge Drive	US 460	
Buckingham	0.60	0.97	SR 602 (Howardsville Road)	Williams Road	Dead End	
Campbell	5.03	8.10	Charlotte County Line	Robin Road White Tail Road Irvindale Road	SR 643 (Lewis Ford Road)	Gap between segments ending at different points along SR 600 Gap between segments ending at different points along SR 601
Caroline	8.20	13.20	Dead End	Alps Road	SR 625 (Passing Road)	
Carroll	3.84	6.18	SR 643 (Oakwood Road)	Worrell Memorial Manor House Drive Pine Branch Road	US 58 (Danville Pike)	Gap between segments ending at different points along SR 645 Gap between segments ending at different points along SR 638
Charles City	10.17	16.37	Dead End	Wilcox Wharf Road Adkins Road	New Kent County Line	Gap between segments ending at different points along SR 5
Charlotte	0.90	1.45	Campbell County Line	Turnip Creek Road	SR 40 (Patrick Henry Highway)	
Chesterfield	5.63	9.06	US 1 (Jefferson Davis Highway)	Old Bermuda Hundred Road Meadowville Road Meadowville Technology Parkway Meadowville Road	End of state maintenance	Gap between a dead end and I-295
Clarke	1.20	1.93	SR 617 (Briggs Road)	Lockes Mill Road	SR 613 (Springsbury Road)	
Craig	4.05	6.52	SR 311	Unnamed road	Dead End	
Culpeper	0.20	0.32	Dead End	Gray Horse Lane	SR 611 (Waterford Road)	
Cumberland	0.34	0.55	SR 45 (Cartersville Road)	Perkins Road	Dead End	
Dickenson	0.70	1.13	SR 600/SR 657	Unnamed road	Russell County Line	
Dinwiddie	4.02	6.47	Sussex County Line	Halligan Park Road	SR 703 (Carson Road)	
Essex	3.22	5.18	SR 619 (Kino Road/Sunnyside Road)	Scotts Mill Road	SR 627 (Mount Landing Road)	
Fauquier	0.67	1.08	SR 616 (Bristersburg Road)	Old Weaversville Road Snake Den Road	Loudoun County Line	Gap between SR 616 and US 50
Floyd	0.80	1.29	SR 738 (Easter Creek Road)	Mount Elbert Road	Montgomery County Line	
Fluvanna	4.53	7.29	Albemarle County Line	Martin Kings Road Lake Monticello Road	SR 600 (Boston Road South)	
Franklin	5.71	9.19	Henry County Line	Muddy Fork Road	US 220 (Virgil H Goode Highway)	
Frederick	3.30	5.31	SR 622 (Cedar Creek Grade)	Gough Road	SR 608 (Wardensville Grade)	
Giles	1.20	1.93	US 460	Collins Avenue	Dead End	
Gloucester	2.40	3.86	Dead End	Cappahosic Road	SR 614 (Hickory Fork Road)	
Goochland	3.10	4.99	SR 616 (Stokes Station Road)	Whittcamp Road	SR 45 (Cartersville Road)	
Grayson	0.60	0.97	SR 607 (Meadow Creek Road)	Mount Vale	SR 89 (Skyline Highway)	
Greene	0.80	1.29	SR 610 (Toms Road)	Heights Hill Road	Orange County Line	
Greensville	0.80	1.29	Dead End	Unnamed road	SR 606 (Grassy Pond Road)	
Halifax	1.60	2.57	SR 617 (Cove Road)	Chester Road	SR 623 (Mortons Ferry Road)	
Hanover	1.20	1.93	Louisa County Line	Belsches Road	SR 680 (Woodson Mill Road)	
Henry	0.20	0.32	SR 890 (Figsboro Road)/SR 886 (Washburn Drive)	Mountain Drive	Franklin County Line	
Highland	4.30	6.92	SR 614	Unnamed road	SR 617	Gap between segments ending at dead ends Gap between segments ending at different points along SR 654
Isle of Wight	1.86	2.99	Suffolk City Limits	Wash Hole Road	US 258	
James City	1.50	2.41	SR 682 (Neck-O-Land Road)	Lake Powell Road	SR 617 (Lake Powell Road)	Gap between segments ending at different points along the shores of Lake Powell (Virginia)
King and Queen	1.00	1.61	SR 14 (The Trail)	Shilo Road	Dead End	
King George	0.62	1.00	SR 218 (Windsor Drive)	Pumpkin Neck Road	Dead End	
King William	6.35	10.22	US 360 (Richmond Tappahannock Highway)	Mount Pleasant Road Acquinton Church Road	SR 629 (Jacks Creek Road)	Gap between segments ending at different points along SR 661
Lancaster	2.46	3.96	SR 354 (River Road)	Nuttsville Road Pierces Road	SR 3 (Mary Ball Road)	Gap between segments ending at different points along SR 622
Lee	1.20	1.93	SR 612 (Middle Wallens Creek Road)	Cam Sam Road	Dead End	
Loudoun	0.63	1.01	Fauquier County Line	Snake Den Road	Dead End	
Louisa	13.17	21.20	Hanover County Line	Belsches Road Fredericks Hall Road First Street	US 522 (Louisa Avenue)	
Lunenburg	0.90	1.45	SR 602 (Longview Drive)	Woodsdale Road	Brunswick County Line	
Madison	3.76	6.05	SR 632 (Beahm Town Road)	Fords Shop Road Waylands Mill Road	Culpeper County Line	
Mathews	0.50	0.80	SR 617 (River Road)	Cardinal Road	SR 660 (River Road)	
Mecklenburg	10.15	16.33	SR 903	Ridout Road Marengo Road Main Street	US 58	
Middlesex	5.70	9.17	SR 614 (Forest Chapel Road)	Oakes Landing Road	Dead End	Gap between segments ending at different points along US 17 Gap between segments ending at different points along US 17 Bus/SR 33
Nelson	0.55	0.89	SR 617 (Buck Creek Lane)	Green Lane	Dead End	
New Kent	7.34	11.81	Charles City County Line	Unnamed road Adkins Road Olivet Church Road	SR 249 (New Kent Highway)	Gap between US 60 and SR 629
Northampton	11.07	17.82	US 13 (Lankford Highway)	Bayside Road Johnsontown Road Bayside Road Hadlock Lane	Dead End	Gap between segments ending at different points along SR 622 Gap between segments ending at different points along SR 619 Gap between segments ending at different points along SR 604
Northumberland	3.00	4.83	Richmond County Line	Fallintown Road Fruit Plain Road	SR 617 (Lively Hope Road)	Gap between segments ending at different points along SR 600
Nottoway	6.56	10.56	US 460 (Virginia Avenue)	Carter Street Indian Oak Road	SR 613 (Turkey Island Road)	
Orange	0.90	1.45	Greene County Line	Taylorsville Road	SR 657 (Albano Road)	
Page	3.70	5.95	Dead End	Dovel Hollow Road	SR 638 (Honeyville Road)	
Patrick	6.69	10.77	SR 8 (Woolwine Highway)	Elamsville Road	SR 57 (Fairystone Park Highway)	
Pittsylvania	4.60	7.40	SR 40 (Gretna Road)	Farmers Road	SR 640 (Renan Road)	
Powhatan	2.20	3.54	US 522 (Maidens Road)	Jefferson Landing Road	Dead End	
Prince Edward	0.40	0.64	SR 619 (Lockett Road)	James Town Road	Amelia County Line	
Prince George	7.87	12.67	SR 627 (Pumphouse Road)	Robin Road Queen Street Hitchcock Road Hollywood Road	SR 616 (Laurel Springs Road/Pole Run Road)	Gap between segments ending at different points along SR 630
Prince William	1.53	2.46	SR 616 (Old Centreville Road)	Maplewood Drive	SR 760 (Rugby Road)	
Pulaski	0.25	0.40	SR 636 (Alum Springs Road)	Eugene Street	Dead End	
Rappahannock	13.17	21.20	SR 231 (Fort Valley Road)	Hawlin Road Red Oak Mountain Road Besse Bell Mountain Road Hope Hill Road Laurel Mills Road	SR 729 (Richmond Road)	Gap between segments ending at different points along US 522 Gap between segments ending at different points along SR 658 Gap between segments ending at different points along SR 626
Richmond	1.00	1.61	SR 661 (Totuskey Church Road)	Fallin Town Road	Northumberland County Line	
Roanoke	4.20	6.76	SR 808 (Riverdale Road)	Highland Road Rutrough Road	Dead End	
Rockbridge	0.40	0.64	SR 780 (Brattons Run)	Blacks Run	Dead End	
Rockingham	1.56	2.51	SR 42 (Timber Way)	Lone Pine Road	SR 211 (New Market Road)	
Russell	3.10	4.99	Dickenson County Line	Jay High Road	SR 601 (Indian Creek Road)	
Scott	6.60	10.62	Tennessee State Line	Unnamed road	US 58	
Shenandoah	0.52	0.84	SR 698 (Palmyra Church Road)	Short Mountain Road	Dead End	
Smyth	0.41	0.66	Dead End	Crisp Road	SR 16	
Southampton	9.50	15.29	SR 616 (Ivor Road)	Sadler Road Crumpler Road	SR 621 (Proctors Bridge Road)	Gap between segments ending at different points along US 460
Spotsylvania	7.67	12.34	SR 3 (Plank Road)	River Road	SR 639 (Bragg Road)	
Stafford	0.35	0.56	US 17 (Warrenton Road)	Falls Run Drive	SR 764 (Nelms Circle)	
Surry	15.56	25.04	SR 621 (Aberdeen Road)	Southwick Road Holybush Road	SR 610 (Swanns Point Road)	Gap between segments ending at different points along SR 617
Sussex	2.15	3.46	Dinwiddie County Line	Unnamed road Halifax Road	SR 657 (Galley Road)	
Tazewell	6.30	10.14	SR 67 (Raven Road)	Road Ridge Turnpike	Buchanan County Line	
Warren	2.19	3.52	Dead End	Unnamed road	SR 615 (Stokes Airport Road)	Gap between segments ending at different points along SR 619
Washington	2.80	4.51	US 58 (Gate City Highway)	Grindstone Branch Road	SR 617 (Cove Creek Road)	
Westmoreland	1.60	2.57	SR 202 (Cople Highway)	Drum Bay Road	Dead End	
Wise	1.20	1.93	Dead End	White Oak Gap Road	SR 621	
Wythe	5.78	9.30	SR 100 (Wysor Highway)	Reed Creek Drive	FR-44 (Lee Highway)	
York	0.55	0.89	SR 620 (Link Road)	Hodges Cove Road	Dead End	
