= Virginia State Route 670 =

State highway in Virginia, United States

State Route 670

Route information
- Maintained by VDOT

Location
- Country: United States
- State: Virginia

Highway system
- Virginia Routes; Interstate; US; Primary; Secondary; Byways; History; HOT lanes

State Route 670 (SR 670) in the U.S. state of Virginia is a secondary route designation applied to multiple discontinuous road segments among the many counties. The list below describes the sections in each county that are designated SR 670.

== List ==
County	Length (mi)	Length (km)	From	Via	To	Notes
Accomack	0.60	0.97	Dead End	Johnsons Landing Road	SR 669 (Lee Mont Road/Hopkins Road)	
Albemarle	1.00	1.61	Dead End	Damon Road	SR 717 (Old Sand Road)	
Alleghany	0.50	0.80	US 60 Bus	Longdale Furnace Road	SR 632 (Golf Course View Road)	
Amelia	0.80	1.29	Dead End	Thompkins Lane	SR 612 (Richmond Road)	
Amherst	4.36	7.02	SR 669 (Glade Road)	Izaak Walton Road Partridge Creek Road	SR 604 (Bobwhite Drive)	Gap between segments ending at different points along SR 663
Appomattox	1.60	2.57	SR 611 (Paradise Road)	Arrowhead Road	SR 608 (Stonewall Road)	
Augusta	5.75	9.25	SR 604 (Gibbs Road)	Broadhead School Road Wagon Shop Road Cherry Grove Road	SR 252 (Middlebrook Road)	
Bath	0.16	0.26	Dead End	Roberts Road	SR 609 (Dry Run Road)	
Bedford	4.09	6.58	US 221 (Forest Road)	Roaring Run Road	SR 644 (Old Cifax Road)	
Bland	3.30	5.31	SR 738 (Byrnes Chapel Road)	Mount Zion Road	Giles County line	
Botetourt	6.76	10.88	US 11 (Lee Highway)	Trinity Road Shavers Farm Road Huff Road	SR 600 (Breckinridge Mill Road)	Gap between segments ending at different points along SR 630
Brunswick	16.80	27.04	SR 46 (Christanna Highway)	Western Mill Road Airport Drive	US 58 (Governor Harrison Parkway)	Gap between segments ending at different points along SR 606
Buchanan	0.85	1.37	Dead End	Abners Fork Road	SR 645	
Buckingham	4.68	7.53	SR 610 (Cartersville Road)	CG Woodson Road	US 15 (James Madison Highway)	
Campbell	4.82	7.76	Lynchburg city limits	Candlers Mountain Road Sunnymeade Road	US 501 (Campbell Highway)	
Caroline	1.60	2.57	SR 600 (Frog Level Road)	Lewis Moore Road	SR 663 (Shumans Road)	
Carroll	10.84	17.45	SR 677 (County Line Road)	Willow Hill Road Volunteer Road Willow Hill Road Snake Creek Road	US 58 (Danville Pike)	Gap between segments ending at the Patrick County line
Charles City	0.19	0.31	Dead End	Salem Heights Drive	SR 609 (Barnetts Road)	
Charlotte	0.80	1.29	SR 617 (Old Well Road)	Poindexter Road	Dead End	
Chesterfield	0.50	0.80	Dead End	Scottswood Road	SR 652 (Old Hundred Road)	
Clarke	0.26	0.42	SR 669 (Highland Corners Road)	Double Tollgate Road	US 340 (Lord Fairfax Highway)	
Craig	0.20	0.32	SR 617	Unnamed road	Dead End	
Culpeper	1.00	1.61	SR 620 (Edwards Shop Road)	Corder Road	SR 672 (Stones Mill Road)	
Cumberland	0.40	0.64	SR 45 (Cumberland Road)	Wilson Russell Drive	US 60 (Anderson Highway)	
Dickenson	10.22	16.45	SR 604	Unnamed road Lick Creek Road	SR 607 (Crooked Branch Road)	
Dinwiddie	13.75	22.13	SR 666 (Baugh Road)	Shady Lane Old Stage Road Duncan Road	US 1 (Boydton Plank Road)	Gap between segments ending at different points along SR 605 Gap between segments ending at different points along SR 613
Essex	0.60	0.97	US 17 (Tidewater Trail)	Broadhurst Road	Dead End	
Fairfax	0.40	0.64	SR 620 (Braddock Road)	Mount Gilead Road	Dead End	
Fauquier	5.55	8.93	Dead End	Old Meetze Road Old Auburn Road Taylor Road	SR 605 (Dumfries Road)	Gap between segments ending at different points along SR 602
Floyd	3.80	6.12	SR 608 (Sunny Ridge Road)	Double Springs Road Wilson Cemetery Road Goff Road Coles Knob Road	SR 610 (Daniels Run Road)	Gap between segments ending at different points along SR 612
Fluvanna	0.20	0.32	Dead End	Prospect Lane	SR 676 (Oliver Creek Road)	
Franklin	9.62	15.48	SR 122 (Booker T Washington Highway)	Burnt Chimney Road	Dead End	
Frederick	1.90	3.06	Dead End	Ruebuck Road	West Virginia state line	
Giles	4.28	6.89	Bland County line	Flat Hollow Road	SR 42 (Walkers Creek Valley Road)	
Goochland	5.20	8.37	SR 6 (River Road)	Cardwell Road	US 250 (Broad Street Road)	Formerly SR 159
Grayson	1.80	2.90	SR 658 (Comers Rock Road)	Laurel View Road	SR 662 (Falls Road)	
Greene	2.40	3.86	SR 607 (Cedar Grove Road)	Preddy Creek Road	Orange County line	
Greensville	0.90	1.45	Dead End	Rainey Pond Road	SR 627 (Brink Road)	
Halifax	4.90	7.89	SR 40 (Stage Coach Road)	Sandy Ridge Road	SR 639 (Rock Barn Road)	
Hanover	5.70	9.17	SR 673 (Howards Mill Road)	Stone Horse Creek Road Farrington Road	SR 657 (Greenwood Church Road)	Gap between segments ending at different points along US 33
Henry	2.22	3.57	SR 993 (Melrose Street)	Cool Springs Road Mill Creek Drive	SR 609 (Daniels Creek Road)	
Isle of Wight	0.43	0.69	SR 665 (Reynolds Drive)	Norsworthy Slant Drive	US 258 (Brewers Neck Boulevard)	
James City	0.21	0.34	SR 31/SR 682	The Colony Road	SR 671 (The Colony Road)	
King and Queen	0.15	0.24	Dead End	Virginia Avenue	SR 33 (Lewis Puller Memorial Highway)	
King George	0.17	0.27	SR 671 (Gordon Drive)	Fifteenth Street	SR 614 (Potomac Drive)	
King William	0.25	0.40	SR 619 (Horse Landing Road)	Horse Landing Road	Dead End	
Lancaster	0.97	1.56	Dead End	Ring Farm Road	SR 646 (Old Salem Road)	
Lee	1.15	1.85	SR 676 (Lamb Hollow Road)	Hennagar Town Road	US 58 (Daniel Boone Heritage Highway)	
Loudoun	1.20	1.93	SR 672 (Lovettsville Road)	Folly Lane	Dead End	
Louisa	0.86	1.38	SR 208 (New Bridge Road)	Oak Grove Drive	Dead End	
Lunenburg	3.50	5.63	Dead End	Buchanan Road Overton Road	SR 680 (Crymes Road)	Gap between segments ending at different points along SR 40
Madison	6.73	10.83	Shenandoah National Park boundary	Old Blue Ridge Turnpike	SR 231 (Blue Ridge Turnpike)	
Mathews	0.42	0.68	SR 623 (Magnolia Road/Bendall Lane)	Bendall Lane	Dead End	
Mecklenburg	4.10	6.60	SR 622 (Lone Oak Road)	Hutcheson Road	SR 669 (Baskerville Road)	
Middlesex	0.58	0.93	Dead End	South Landing Road	SR 640 (Waterview Road)	
Montgomery	1.20	1.93	SR 669 (Fairview Church Road)	Dairy Road	SR 8 (Riner Road)	
Nelson	2.00	3.22	SR 620 (Rock Spring Road)	Church Lane Cove Valley Road	Dead End	Gap between segments ending at different points along SR 6
New Kent	0.51	0.82	Dead End	Sherwood Drive	SR 611 (South Quaker Road)	
Northampton	0.37	0.60	SR 630 (Old Town Neck Road)	James Circle	SR 659 (Church Street)	
Northumberland	0.80	1.29	Dead End	Hardings Wharf Drive	SR 605 (Mount Olive Road)	
Nottoway	0.50	0.80	US 360 (Patrick Henry Highway)	Highpoint Road	Dead End	
Orange	1.25	2.01	Greene County	Ridgeway Drive	SR 607 (Carpenters Mill Road)	
Page	1.62	2.61	SR 689 (Ida Road)	Somers Road	SR 668 (Lake Arrowhead Road)	
Patrick	1.00	1.61	Dead End	Hayden Road	SR 614 (Unity Church Road)	
Pittsylvania	8.75	14.08	SR 634 (Blue Ridge Drive)	Deer View Road	SR 640 (Renan Road)	
Prince Edward	3.07	4.94	Charlotte County line	Spring Creek Road	SR 665 (Darlington Heights Road)	
Prince George	0.26	0.42	FR-294 (Rowanty Court)	Rowanty Court	SR 623 (Rowanty Road)	
Prince William	0.03	0.05	Manassas city limits	Plantation Lane	SR 1555/SR 1740	
Pulaski	2.57	4.14	Dead End	Miller Owens Road Lizzie Gunn Road Beamers Hollow Road	Dead End	Gap between segments ending at different points along SR 672
Rappahannock	0.15	0.24	SR 660 (Waterfall Road)	Cemetery Road	SR 610 (Chester Gap Road)	
Richmond	0.65	1.05	US 360 (Richmond Road)	Scott Town Road	SR 699 (Scott Town Road)	
Roanoke	0.98	1.58	Dead End	Lost Mountain Road Canyon Road	Dead End	
Rockbridge	7.62	12.26	Dead End	Unnamed road Beatty Hollow Road Bordon Road	Lexington city limits	Gap between segments ending at different points along SR 251 Gap between segments ending at different points along SR 672
Rockingham	0.30	0.48	Dead End	Rodehafer Road	SR 671 (Shady Grove Road)	
Russell	3.70	5.95	Tazewell County line	Mill Creek Road	Dead End	
Scott	7.70	12.39	SR 675 (Midway Road)	Addington Frame Road	SR 71 (Nicklesville Highway)	Gap between segments ending at different points along SR 669
Shenandoah	0.77	1.24	Dead End	East Reservoir Road	Woodstock town limits	Gap between segments ending at different points along SR 609
Smyth	5.00	8.05	SR 650 (South Fork Road/Corners Creek Road)	Teas Road	SR 601 (Teas Road)	
Southampton	1.51	2.43	SR 35 (Meherrin Road)	Deloatch Road Number 8 School House Road Unnamed road	SR 743 (Fuller Mills Road)	
Spotsylvania	1.65	2.66	SR 738 (Partlow Road)	Winding Road	SR 605 (Marye Road)	
Stafford	2.41	3.88	SR 656 (Greenbank Road)	Sanford Drive Stanstead Road	SR 1050 (Stanstead Road)	
Surry	0.10	0.16	Dead End	Surry Village Drive	SR 626 (Lebanon Road)	
Sussex	4.23	6.81	SR 657 (Main Street)	Cedar Road Unnamed road Setzer Lane	SR 602 (Cabin Point Road)	
Tazewell	2.94	4.73	Russell County line	Mill Creek Road	SR 67 (Raven Road)	
Warren	0.60	0.97	Dead End	Point Road	SR 737	
Washington	9.61	15.47	Abingdon town limits	Vances Mill Road Spoon Gap Road Green Springs Church Road Denton Valley Road	SR 673 (Drake Road/Twin Oaks Road)	Gap between SR 75 and SR 665
Westmoreland	0.11	0.18	SR 604 (Sandy Point Road)	Unnamed road	SR 203 (Oldhams Road)	
Wise	0.37	0.60	SR 643 (Redwine Road)	Unnamed road	SR 640	
Wythe	10.83	17.43	SR 616 (Murphyville Road)	Scowanda Springs Road Unnamed road Sharons Drive Zion Church Road	US 21 (Grayson Turnpike)	
York	0.34	0.55	SR 622 (Seaford Road)	Hansford Lane	Dead End	
