= Virginia State Route 636 =

State highway in Virginia, United States

State Route 636

Route information
- Maintained by VDOT

Location
- Country: United States
- State: Virginia

Highway system
- Virginia Routes; Interstate; US; Primary; Secondary; Byways; History; HOT lanes

State Route 636 (SR 636) in the U.S. state of Virginia is a secondary route designation applied to multiple discontinuous road segments among the many counties. The list below describes the sections in each county that are designated SR 636.

== List ==
County	Length (mi)	Length (km)	From	Via	To	Notes
Accomack	1.10	1.77	Dead End	Crockett Town Road	SR 717 (Tarkill Road)	
Albemarle	4.80	7.72	Nelson County Line	Batesville Road	SR 635 (Craig Store Road)	
Alleghany	0.27	0.43	Dead End	Morgan Drive	SR 42 (Forty Two Road)	
Amelia	12.79	20.58	SR 604 (Chula Road)	North Lodore Road South Giles Road Brackets Bend Lane	Dead End	Gap between segments ending at different points along SR 616
Amherst	16.87	27.15	SR 671	High Peak Road Unnamed road High Peak Road Wares Gap Road Kersey Road Slap Creek Road High Peak Road	Dead End	Gap between segments ending at different points along SR 643 Gap between segments ending at different points along SR 610
Appomattox	5.00	8.05	SR 630 (Old Evergreen Road)	Rock Spring Road Chestnut Grove Road	SR 644 (Cub Creek Lane/Fox Ridge Road)	
Augusta	2.59	4.17	US 250 (Jefferson Highway)	Goose Creek Road Lifecore Drive	SR 285 (Tinkling Spring Road)	Gap between a dead end and North Campus Drive
Bath	0.60	0.97	SR 633	Unnamed road	SR 637 (Lower Yard)	Gap between segments ending at different points along SR 635
Bedford	0.70	1.13	Dead End	Carroll Road	SR 757 (Goodview Road)	
Bland	0.16	0.26	Dead End	Walnut Drive	SR 648 (Angles Pass Drive)	
Botetourt	5.48	8.82	SR 630 (Springwood Road)	Little Timber Ridge Black Magic Road Beaver Dam Road Hardbarger Road Glade Creek Road	Dead End	Gap between segments ending at different points along US 11 Gap between SR 640 and a dead end
Brunswick	5.40	8.69	SR 616 (Lew Jones Road)	Kress Road	SR 630 (Waqua Creek Road)	
Buchanan	9.54	15.35	Tazewell County Line	Chicken Ridge Road Unnamed road	SR 616	
Buckingham	23.75	38.22	US 60 (James Anderson Highway)	Tower Hill Road Francisco Road Stage Coach Road	Cumberland County Line	Gap between segments ending at different points along SR 24
Campbell	0.51	0.82	SR 605 (Whipping Creek Road)	William Campbell Drive	SR 917 (Railview Road)	
Caroline	1.50	2.41	SR 625 (Passing Road)	Bethlehem Road	Essex County Line	
Carroll	2.00	3.22	Dead End	Loafers Rest	Wythe County Line	
Charles City	0.65	1.05	SR 5 (John Tyler Memorial Highway)	Shady Lane	Dead End	
Charlotte	1.80	2.90	SR 746 (Scuffletown Road)	Garnette Road Roxabel Road	SR 645 (Carwile Springs Road)	Gap between dead ends
Chesterfield	8.72	14.03	Dead End	Exter Mill Road Nash Road Nabor Way	SR 655 (Beach Road)	Gap between segments ending at different points along SR 602 Gap between segments ending at different points along SR 626 Gap between segments ending at different points along SR 655
Clarke	1.50	2.41	SR 657 (Senseny Road)	Westwood Road	SR 7 Bus	
Craig	3.50	5.63	West Virginia State Line	Old Waiteville Road Unnamed road	SR 658	
Culpeper	1.00	1.61	SR 644 (Reva Road)	Glebe Way	SR 716 (Whippoorwill Lane)	
Cumberland	4.30	6.92	Buckingham County Line	Cedar Lane Raines Tavern Road Raines Road	Dead End	
Dickenson	2.60	4.18	SR 637	Unnamed road	SR 633	
Dinwiddie	0.27	0.43	Dead End	Rocky Branch Road	US 460 (Cox Road)	
Essex	1.20	1.93	Caroline County Line	Bethlehem Road	SR 635 (Elevon Road)	
Fairfax	6.17	9.93	SR 123 (Ox Road)	Hooes Road	SR 1391 (Constantine Avenue)	Gap between SR 640 and SR 8948 Gap between a dead end and SR 638
Fauquier	0.40	0.64	Dead End	Stoney Road	SR 674 (Green Road)	
Floyd	0.61	0.98	SR 740 (White Rock Road)	Carthage Road	Dead End	
Fluvanna	2.95	4.75	Dead End	Nahor Manor Road Garden Lane	Dead End	
Franklin	7.55	12.15	SR 670 (Burnt Chimney Road)	Lost Mountain Road Hardy Road Wysong Mill Road	Dead End	Gap between segments ending at different points along SR 122
Frederick	10.80	17.38	SR 627 (Reliance Road)	Huttle Road Canterburg Road Hudson Hollow Road White Oak Road	SR 756	Gap between segments ending at different points along SR 735 Gap between segments ending at different points along SR 641
Giles	2.14	3.44	US 460 Bus	Ripplemead Road	Dead End	
Gloucester	5.29	8.51	SR 633 (Cedar Bush Road)	Providence Road Brays Point Road	Dead End	Gap between segments ending at different points along US 17 (George Washington Memorial Highway)
Goochland	0.70	1.13	US 250 (Broad Street)	Elpis Church Road	SR 702 (Pony Farm Road)	
Grayson	5.74	9.24	SR 9513 (Grammar Lane)	Grammar Lane Haystack Road Rock Chimney Road Beech Grove Lane	Dead End	
Greene	1.20	1.93	Shenandoah National Park boundary	Goose Pond Road	SR 625 (Golden Horshoe Road)	
Halifax	5.25	8.45	SR 40 (Stage Coach Road)	Thorntons Road Childrey Church Road Childrey Road	SR 626 (Shiloh Church Road)	Gap between segments ending at different points along US 501
Hanover	2.97	4.78	SR 156 (Cold Harbor Road)/SR 643 (Lee Davis Road)	Walnut Grove Road	US 360 (Mechanicsville Turnpike)	
Henry	5.66	9.11	SR 750 (Old Leaksville Road)	Mitchell Road	SR 697 (Middle Creek Road)	
Highland	1.44	2.32	US 220	Unnamed road Spruce Street Maple Street	Dead End	
Isle of Wight	3.55	5.71	SR 603 (Bank Street)	Griffin Street Old Suffolk Road Unnamed road	SR 690 (Ennis Mill Road)	
James City	0.14	0.23	US 60 (Richmond Road)	Peach Street	SR 676 (Farmville Lane)	
King and Queen	4.00	6.44	SR 634 (Canterbury Road)	Minter Lane Pea Ridge Road	SR 14 (The Trail)	Gap between segments ending at different points along SR 633
King George	0.38	0.61	SR 1134 (Schooner Drive)	Rosedale Drive	SR 206/SR 668	
King William	1.89	3.04	SR 702 (Industrial Parkway)	VFW Road	SR 30 (King William Road)	
Lancaster	0.50	0.80	SR 635 (Steamboat Road)	The Lane	Dead End	
Lee	2.60	4.18	SR 352	Monarch Road	Dead End	
Loudoun	2.17	3.49	Dead End	Shaw Road	SR 625 (Church Road)	
Louisa	4.90	7.89	SR 695 (Hamilton Road)	Valentine Mills Road Dumkum Store Road	Dead End	Gap between segments ending at different points along US 33
Lunenburg	3.03	4.88	Mecklenburg County Line	Whittles Mill Road	SR 637 (Craig Mill Road)	
Madison	0.83	1.34	SR 637 (Clore Road)	River Road	US 29 (Seminole Trail)	
Mathews	1.48	2.38	Dead End	Bay Haven Road	Dead End	
Mecklenburg	2.02	3.25	SR 654 (Whitles Mill Road)	Bridge Road	Lunenburg County Line	
Middlesex	1.26	2.03	SR 33 (General Puller Highway)	Timberneck Road	Dead End	
Montgomery	6.23	10.03	US 11/US 460	Friendship Road Harkrader Street Friendship Road Seneca Hollow Road	US 11/US 460	
Nelson	1.20	1.93	SR 638 (Avon Road)	Batesville Road	Albemarle County Line	
New Kent	0.80	1.29	SR 273 (Farmers Drive)	Plum Point Road	Dead End	
Northampton	1.60	2.57	US 13	Cobbs Station Road	SR 600 (Seaside Road)	
Northumberland	4.53	7.29	US 360 (Northumberland Highway)	Avalon Lane Newmans Neck Road	SR 836 (Potomac Drive)	
Nottoway	3.10	4.99	US 460 Bus	Reservation Road	SR 634 (Wellville Road)	
Orange	6.60	10.62	SR 627 (Clarks Mountain Road)	River Road	US 522 (Zachary Taylor Highway)	
Page	2.64	4.25	US 340 Bus	Unnamed road	US 340 Bus	Gap between segments ending at different points along SR 616
Patrick	4.46	7.18	SR 639 (Cherry Creek Road)	Free Union Road State Shed Road	SR 610 (Cloudbreak Road)	
Pittsylvania	0.25	0.40	Dead End	Kellys Drive	SR 633 (Easome Road)	
Powhatan	2.48	3.99	SR 13 (Old Buckingham Road)	Cook Road	Dead End	
Prince Edward	4.99	8.03	SR 696 (Green Bay Road)	Poorhouse Road Fox Hill Road	Dead End	
Prince George	2.90	4.67	SR 635 (Centennial Road)	Lawyers Road	SR 609 (Old Stage Road)	
Prince William	2.47	3.98	SR 1300 (Pine Lane West)	Pine Lane Featherstone Road Bay Street	Dead End	Gap between Bay Street and Featherstone Road/Veterans Drive
Pulaski	10.73	17.27	Pulaski Town Limits	Alum Springs Road BlackHollow Road	SR 100 (Clebone Road)	
Rappahannock	0.71	1.14	Dead End	Schoolhouse Road	US 211/US 522 (Lee Highway)	
Richmond	4.02	6.47	SR 634 (Naylors Beach Road)	Strangeway Road Havelock Road	SR 637 (Piney Grove Road/County Bridge Road)	Gap between segments ending at different points along SR 624
Roanoke	0.51	0.82	SR 603 (Bonsack Road)	Glade Creek Road	Botetourt County Line	
Rockbridge	0.40	0.64	SR 646 (Big Hill Road)	Bane Place	Dead End	
Rockingham	3.60	5.79	Dead End	Runkels Gap Road Bethel Church Road	SR 635 (River Road)	Gap between segments ending at different points along SR 602
Russell	3.72	5.99	SR 640 (Clifton Farm Road)	Kents Ridge Road	SR 67 (Swords Creek Road)	
Scott	1.10	1.77	SR 632	Unnamed road	SR 614 (Yuma Road)	
Shenandoah	0.50	0.80	SR 653	Sand Ridge Road	SR 623 (Back Road)	
Smyth	0.45	0.72	SR 610 (Valley Drive)	Hunters Lane	Dead End	
Southampton	0.08	0.13	SR 641 (Johnsons Mill Road)	Unnamed road	Dead End	
Spotsylvania	4.60	7.40	SR 208 (Courthouse Road)	Ewell Road Hood Drive Mine Road	SR 608 (Benchmark Road)	
Stafford	0.04	0.06	Dead End	Post Office	SR 705 (Hartwood Church Road)	
Surry	2.45	3.94	SR 634 (Alliance Road)	Cobham Wharf Road	Dead End	
Sussex	5.90	9.50	SR 40 (Sussex Drive)	Anderson Road Booker Road Anderson Road	SR 661 (Tyus)	Gap between segments ending at different points along SR 626 Gap between segments ending at different points along SR 637
Tazewell	10.10	16.25	SR 627 (Bandy Road)	McGuire Valley Road Dry Fork Road	SR 16 (Adria Road)	
Warren	1.00	1.61	Dead End	Crassland Road	SR 638	
Washington	1.90	3.06	Tennessee State Line	Dishner Valley Road	SR 637 (Miller Hill Road)	
Westmoreland	1.95	3.14	SR 634 (Claymont Road)	Cottage Farm Road	SR 638 (Leedstown Road)	
Wise	4.93	7.93	Wise Town Limits	Birchfield Road Unnamed road Dotson Creek Road	SR 634 (Birchfield Road)	Gap between a dead end and SR 643
Wythe	2.07	3.33	Carroll County Line	Unnamed road Store Hill Road	SR 619 (Austinville Road)	Gap between segments ending at different points along SR 69
York	0.84	1.35	Newport News City Limits	Richneck Road	SR 105	
