= Virginia State Route 621 =

State highway in Virginia, United States

State Route 621

Route information
- Maintained by VDOT

Location
- Country: United States
- State: Virginia

Highway system
- Virginia Routes; Interstate; US; Primary; Secondary; Byways; History; HOT lanes

State Route 621 (SR 621) in the U.S. state of Virginia is a secondary route designation applied to multiple discontinuous road segments among the many counties. The list below describes the sections in each county that are designated SR 621.

== List ==
County	Length (mi)	Length (km)	From	Via	To	Notes
Accomack	1.20	1.93	SR 620 (Keller Pond Road)	Red Hill Road	SR 600 (Seaside Road)	
Albemarle	1.10	1.77	Dead End	Wolf Trap Road	SR 20 (Stony Point Road)	
Alleghany	1.30	2.09	Botetourt County Line	Roaring Run Road	SR 616 (Rich Patch Road)	
Amelia	7.95	12.79	SR 616 (Genito Road)	Reed Rock Road Fowlkes Bridge Road	Cumberland County Line	Gap between segments ending at different points along SR 620
Amherst	5.70	9.17	Dead End	Indian Creek Road Warrick Barn Road	SR 694 (Warrick Barn Road)	
Appomattox	1.09	1.75	SR 633 (Hixburg Road)	Suanee Creek Road	SR 620 (Old Bethany Road)	
Augusta	1.30	2.09	US 340 (East Side Highway)	Sandy Ridge Road	Dead End	
Bath	2.93	4.72	SR 39 (Mountain Valley Road)	McGuffin Road	US 220 (Ingalls Boulevard)	
Bedford	6.78	10.91	SR 644 (Coffee Road)	Cottontown Road	US 221 (Forest Road)	
Bland	3.00	4.83	SR 42 (Blue Grass Highway)	Old Mountain Road	US 52 (South Scenic Highway)	
Botetourt	2.95	4.75	Alleghany County Line	Roaring Run Road	SR 615 (Craig Creek Road)	
Brunswick	2.90	4.67	Lunenburg County Line	Meherrin River Road	SR 619 (Shining Creek Road)	
Buchanan	4.20	6.76	Dead End	Brown Mountain	Tazewell County Line	
Buckingham	3.03	4.88	US 15/SR 775 (Allen Rosen Road)	Evans Mill Road	SR 600 (Plank Road)	
Campbell	0.27	0.43	Dead End	Oak Grove Drive	SR 738 (Greenhouse Road)	
Caroline	4.50	7.24	SR 640 (Maragossic Drive)	Locust Hill Road Stump Road	SR 618 (Alps Road)	Gap between segments ending at different points along SR 608
Carroll	0.25	0.40	SR 714 (Old Galax Pike)	Farmers Circle	SR 714 (Old Galax Pike)	
Charles City	2.50	4.02	Dead End	Eagles Nest Road	SR 623 (Wilcox Neck Road)	
Charlotte	1.68	2.70	Dead End	Floralee Road	SR 672 (Midway Road)	
Chesterfield	8.31	13.37	Dead End	Epps Falls Road Black Road Winterpock Road	US 360 (Hull Street)	Gap between segments ending at different points along SR 602
Clarke	10.90	17.54	SR 723 (Millwood Road)	Unnamed road	SR 7 (Harry Flood Byrd Highway)	
Craig	9.83	15.82	Montgomery County Line	Upper Craig Creek Road	SR 311 (Craig Valley Drive)	
Culpeper	8.83	14.21	Fauquier County Line	Lakota Road Jeffersonton Road Colvin Road Riley Road	SR 613 (Waterloo Road)	
Cumberland	2.00	3.22	Amelia County Line	Brook Hill	SR 13 (Old Buckingham Road)	
Dickenson	4.20	6.76	SR 72 (Cranes Nest Road)	Unnamed road	SR 631 (Brush Creek Road)	
Dinwiddie	2.00	3.22	US 460	Clay Street	Dead End	
Essex	1.00	1.61	US 360 (Richmond Highway)	Midway Road	SR 622 (Latanes Mill Road/Faucetts Road)	
Fairfax	4.81	7.74	Loudoun County Line	Bull Run Post Office Road	SR 658 (Compton Road)	
Fauquier	0.20	0.32	Culpeper County Line	Freemans Ford Road	SR 651 (Lees Mill Road)	
Floyd	0.40	0.64	Dead End	Old Rifton School Road	SR 672 (Laurel Creek Road)	
Fluvanna	0.40	0.64	Dead End	Lantre Lane	SR 611 (Paynes Landing Road)	
Franklin	1.50	2.41	SR 122 (Booker T Washington Highway)	Black Rock Road	Dead End	
Frederick	3.83	6.16	SR 628 (Middle Road)	Jones Road Merrimans Lane	Winchester City Limits	
Giles	0.70	1.13	SR 622 (Guinea Mountain Road)	Hiram Jones Road	SR 730 (Eggleston Road)	
Gloucester	1.91	3.07	US 17 Bus	Ware House Road	Dead End	
Goochland	10.36	16.67	Dead End	Manakin Ferry Road Manakin Road	Hanover County Line	
Grayson	0.70	1.13	SR 622 (Delhart Road)	Nexus Road	SR 617 (White Pine Road)	
Greene	3.60	5.79	Dead End	South River Road	SR 637 (South River Road/Octonia Road)	
Greensville	3.81	6.13	SR 633 (Pine Log Road)	Diamond Grove Road Quarry Road	SR 629 (Moores Ferry Road)	
Halifax	17.03	27.41	SR 647 (Leda Grove Road)	Bradley Creek Road Beaver Pond Road Chilsolm Trail Hodges Street Newbill School Road	SR 603 (Hunting Creek Road)	Gap between dead ends Gap between segments ending at different points along SR 626
Hanover	0.80	1.29	Goochland County Line	Manakin Road	SR 620 (Dogwood Trail Road)	
Henry	0.21	0.34	SR 610 (Axton Road)	Cascade Road	Pittsylvania County Line	
Highland	1.18	1.90	Dead End	Unnamed road	SR 636	
Isle of Wight	13.17	21.20	Southampton County Line	Old Blackwater/Proctors Bridge Mill Swamp Road Burwells Bay Road	Dead End	
James City	1.00	1.61	SR 622 (Racefield Drive)	Stewarts Road	New Kent County Line	
King and Queen	3.80	6.12	SR 14 (The Trail)	Bruington Road	US 360/Essex County Line	
King George	1.60	2.57	SR 629 (Round Hill Road)	Pine Hill Road	SR 205 (Ridge Road)	
King William	6.59	10.61	Dead End	Green Level Road	SR 633 (Powhatan Trail)	
Lancaster	0.50	0.80	SR 622 (Morattico Road)	Riverside Drive	Dead End	
Lee	30.41	48.94	SR 946 (Burning Well Road)	Left Poor Valley Road Right Poor Valley Road Cave Springs Road Wampler Hollow Road	US 58 Alt	Gap between segments ending at different points along US 421
Loudoun	15.23	24.51	Fairfax County Line	Bull Run Post Office Road Elk Lick Road Vance Road Evergreen Mills Road	Leesburg Town Line	Gap between segments ending at different points along SR 620 Gap between segments ending at different points along US 50 Gap between segments ending at opposite sides of Washington Dulles International Airport
Louisa	2.40	3.86	SR 613 (Goldmine Road)	Peach Grove Road	Dead End	
Lunenburg	1.10	1.77	Mecklenburg County Line	Dix Drive	Brunswick County Line	
Madison	12.11	19.49	SR 662 (Shelby Road)	Seville Road Jacks Shop Road Beautiful Run Road	SR 230 (Orange Road)	Gap between segments ending at different points along SR 231
Mathews	2.55	4.10	Dead End	Glebe Road	SR 14 (Buckley Hall Road)	
Mecklenburg	8.76	14.10	SR 618 (High Street)	Main Street Country Club Road Dixie Bridge Road	Lunenburg County Line	Gap between segments ending at different points along US 1
Middlesex	0.74	1.19	SR 3 (Greys Point Road)	Locklies Creek Road	Dead End	
Montgomery	11.47	18.46	US 460 (Pandapas Pond Road)	Craig Creek Road	Craig County Line	
Nelson	0.14	0.23	SR 623 (Stage Bridge Road)	Spencer Lane	Dead End	
New Kent	1.20	1.93	James City County Line	Roper Church Road	SR 632 (Stage Road)	
Northampton	1.04	1.67	SR 600 (Seaside Road)	Goshen Road	Dead End	
Northumberland	3.07	4.94	SR 202 (Hampton Hall Road)	Mundy Point Road	Dead End	
Nottoway	1.82	2.93	Prince Edward County Line	Burkes Tavern Road	SR 716 (Namozine Street)	
Orange	11.94	19.22	Dead End	Church Hill Road Pine Stake Road Mine Run Road Old Plank Road	Spotsylvania County Line	Gap between segments ending at different points along US 522 Gap between segments ending at different points along SR 20
Page	4.08	6.57	Dead End	Unnamed road Keystone Road	SR 638 (Honeyville Road)	
Patrick	1.21	1.95	Dead End	Bouldin Church Lane Community Church Lane	Dead End	
Pittsylvania	7.07	11.38	Henry County Line	Loblolly Drive Unicorn Drive Huntington Trail Ed Hardy Road	SR 875 (Horseshoe Road)	Gap between segments ending at different points along SR 855 Gap between segments ending at different points along SR 862
Powhatan	3.90	6.28	SR 600 (Saint Emma Drive)/SR 684 (Bell Road)	Cosby Road	US 522 (Maidens Road)	
Prince Edward	3.48	5.60	US 360	Twin Lakes Road Grape Lawn Road Burkes Tavern Road	Nottoway County Line	
Prince George	2.28	3.67	SR 604 (Halifax Road)	Shands Road	SR 605 (Spain Road)	
Prince William	6.42	10.33	SR 619 (Linton Hall Road)	Devlin Road Balls Ford Road	Dead End	
Pulaski	0.84	1.35	SR 622 (Dudley Ferry Road)	Brooklyn Road	SR 679 (Viscoe Road)	
Rappahannock	11.15	17.94	SR 231 (F T Valley Road)	Yancey Road Rudasill Mill Road Hunters Road	SR 626 (Tiger Valley Road)	Gap between segments ending at different points along US 522 Gap between segments ending at different points along SR 622
Richmond	4.78	7.69	SR 624 (Newland Road)	Chestnut Hill Road Menokin Road Piney Grove Road	Westmoreland County Line	Gap between segments ending at different points along SR 690
Roanoke	0.45	0.72	SR 601 (Hollins Road)	Beaumont Road	SR 605 (Old Mountain Road)	
Rockbridge	0.60	0.97	Dead End	Unnamed road	SR 602 (Turkey Hill Road)	Gap between segments ending at different points along SR 623
Rockingham	0.20	0.32	SR 623 (Mount Pleasant Road)	Dean Mountain Road	Dead End	
Russell	14.12	22.72	SR 600 (Gravel Lick Road)	Sandy Ridge Road	SR 615 (Black Valley Road)	
Scott	8.60	13.84	SR 600 (Fairview Road)	Unnamed road England Valley Road Unnamed road	SR 600	
Shenandoah	5.40	8.69	Dead End	Fairmont Lane	SR 714 (Turkey Run Road)	Gap between segments ending at different points along SR 600
Smyth	3.15	5.07	SR 42 (Old Wilderness Road)	Lick Creek Road	Dead End	
Southampton	1.45	2.33	Isle of Wight County Line	Proctors Bridge Road Old Blackwater Road	Surry County Line	
Spotsylvania	7.00	11.27	Orange County Line	Orange Plank Road	SR 3 (Plank Road)	
Stafford	2.55	4.10	SR 608 (Brooke Road)	Marlborough Point Road	Dead End	
Surry	2.40	3.86	Southampton County Line	Aberdeen Road	SR 617 (White Marsh Road)	
Sussex	7.36	11.84	SR 654 (Coppahaunk Road)	Unnamed road Harrells Mill Road	SR 620 (Brittle Mill Road)	
Tazewell	10.69	17.20	Dead End	Middle Creek Road Stinson Creek Road	SR 616 (Bearwallow Road)	
Warren	0.60	0.97	SR 660	Punch Run Road	SR 55 (Strasburg Road)	
Washington	0.30	0.48	SR 614 (Swinging Bridge Road)	Barnrock Road	SR 802 (Mendota Road)	
Westmoreland	10.58	17.03	Richmond County Line	Nomini Grove Road Prospect Hill Road Mount Holly Road North Tidwells Road	SR 650 (Tidwells Road)	Gap between segments ending at different points along SR 600 Gap between segments ending at different points along SR 202 Gap between segments ending at different points along SR 626
Wise	4.36	7.02	Norton City Limits	Unnamed road Dorchester Road Unnamed road	SR 610	Gap between SR 610 and the Norton City Limits
Wythe	2.01	3.23	SR 608	Unnamed road	SR 100 (Wysor Highway)	
York	3.90	6.28	US 17 (George Washington Memorial Highway)	Grafton Drive Dare Road	Dead End	Gap between a dead end and US 17
