= Virginia State Route 634 =

State highway in Virginia, United States

State Route 634

Route information
- Maintained by VDOT

Location
- Country: United States
- State: Virginia

Highway system
- Virginia Routes; Interstate; US; Primary; Secondary; Byways; History; HOT lanes

State Route 634 (SR 634) in the U.S. state of Virginia is a secondary route designation applied to multiple discontinuous road segments among the many counties. The list below describes the sections in each county that are designated SR 634.

== List ==
County	Length (mi)	Length (km)	From	Via	To	Notes
Accomack	1.20	1.93	SR 638 (Evans Wharf Road)	Mount Nebo Road	SR 637 (Mount Nebo Road/Omega Road)	
Albemarle	2.90	4.67	Nelson County Line	Spring Valley Road	SR 633 (Heards Mountain Trail/Taylor Creek Road)	
Alleghany	1.20	1.93	Dead End	Riverland Road	SR 633 (McKinney Hollow Road)	
Amelia	0.36	0.58	Dead End	Leidig Street	SR 614 (Otterburn Road)	
Amherst	4.90	7.89	US 60 (Lexington Turnpike)	Coffey Town Road	Dead End	
Appomattox	2.81	4.52	SR 631 (Oakleigh Avenue)	South Fork Road	US 460 (Richmond Highway)	
Augusta	3.95	6.36	SR 610 (Howardsville Turnpike)	China Clay Road Patton Farm Road	SR 970 (Hall School Road)	
Bath	0.65	1.05	Dead End	Sugar Hollow	SR 633	
Bedford	4.98	8.01	Franklin County Line	Hardy Road	Roanoke County Line	
Bland	0.57	0.92	SR 738 (Byrnes Chapel Road)	Mechanicsburg Road	SR 42 (Blue Grass Highway)	
Botetourt	3.50	5.63	SR 630 (Springwood Road)	Spreading Spring Road Cedar Lane	SR 630 (Springwood Road)	Gap between segments ending at different points along SR 635
Brunswick	16.96	27.29	SR 606 (Belfield Road)	Freeman Cross Road Reedy Creek Road Liberty Road	US 1 (Boydton Plank Road)	
Buchanan	1.70	2.74	Russell County Line	Pistol Branch	SR 618 (Fox Ridge Drive)	
Buckingham	0.62	1.00	Cumberland County Line	Salem Road	SR 654 (Back Mountain Road)	
Campbell	0.59	0.95	Dead End	Massies Road Nest Lane	Dead End	Gap between segments ending at different points along SR 664
Caroline	2.20	3.54	SR 633 (Bull Church Road)	Michaels Road	SR 664 (Bath Road)	
Carroll	1.79	2.88	SR 618 (Pine Branch Road)	Germantown Road Hurricane Ridge Road	Floyd County Line	
Charles City	0.16	0.26	Dead End	Sterling Heights Lane	SR 155 (Courthouse Road)	
Charlotte	4.50	7.24	SR 611 (Hebron Church Road)	Westview Farm Road	SR 612 (Sunnyside Road/Herman Road)	
Chesterfield	3.69	5.94	SR 636 (Nash Road)	Cattail Road	SR 626 (Woodpecker Road)	
Clarke	0.58	0.93	SR 655 (Opequan Road)	Salem Church Road	SR 657 (Senseny Road)	
Craig	0.12	0.19	SR 311	Unnamed road	SR 650 (Marshall Avenue)	
Culpeper	2.90	4.67	SR 637 (Memory Lane/Shanktown Road)	Griffinsburg Road	US 522 (Sperryville Pike)	
Cumberland	3.45	5.55	Buckingham County Line	Salem Church Road	SR 45 (Cumberland Road)	
Dickenson	0.80	1.29	Dead End	Unnamed road	Wise County Line	Gap between segments ending at different points along SR 72
Dinwiddie	0.25	0.40	US 1 (Boydton Plank Road)	Pine Grove Place	Dead End	
Essex	0.05	0.08	SR 684 (Howerton Road)	Lebanon Church Road	Dead End	
Fairfax	1.25	2.01	SR 611 (Telegraph Road)	Old Telegraph Road	SR 611 (Telegraph Road)	
Fauquier	6.20	9.98	SR 637 (Shipps Store Road)	Courtneys Corner Road Goldmine Road Elk Run Church Road	SR 806 (Elk Run Road)	Gap between US 17 and SR 806
Floyd	1.70	2.74	SR 610 (Daniels Run)	Level Bottom Road	SR 808 (Diamond Knob Road)	
Fluvanna	1.70	2.74	Dead End	Mechunk Creek Drive	SR 600 (Paynes Mill Road/North Boston Road)	
Franklin	9.03	14.53	SR 122 (Booker T Washington Highway)	Harmony School Road Eton Road Hardy Road	Bedford County Line	
Frederick	1.00	1.61	US 11 (Valley Pike)	Cougill Road	SR 625	
Giles	3.04	4.89	Pearisburg Town Limits	Curve Road	Dead End	
Gloucester	1.48	2.38	Dead End	Shelly Road	SR 633 (Cedar Bush Road)	
Goochland	6.40	10.30	US 522 (River Road/Maidens Road)	Maidens Road	US 250 (Broad Street)	
Grayson	9.66	15.55	Dead End	Longview Lane Beech Grove Lane Grinders Mill Road Justice Road Water Wheel Road	SR 606 (Water Wheel Road)	Gap between SR 94 and SR 882 Gap between segments ending at different points along SR 640
Greene	6.26	10.07	SR 810 (Dyke Road)	Mutton Hollow Road Bull Yearling Road	SR 638 (Turkey Ridge Road)	Gap between segments ending at different points along US 33
Greensville	1.50	2.41	US 301 (Skippers Road)	Bass Road	Dead End	
Halifax	1.70	2.74	SR 632 (Hog Wallow Road)	Elder Road	SR 636 (Childrey Church Road)	
Hanover	3.53	5.68	SR 632 (Crown Hill Road)	Beatties Mill Road New Bethesda Road	SR 606 (Studley Road)	Gap between segments ending at different points along US 360
Henry	1.49	2.40	SR 636 (Mitchell Road)	Joppa Road	SR 632 (Cox Road)	
Highland	1.20	1.93	US 220	Unnamed road	Dead End	
Isle of Wight	1.23	1.98	SR 633 (Rhodes Drive)	Little Norfolk Road	US 258 (Walters Highway)	
James City	0.90	1.45	SR 30 (Old Stage Highway)	Fire Tower Road	Dead End	
King and Queen	7.39	11.89	SR 633 (Stones Road)	Mount Elba Road Canterbury Road	SR 14 (The Trail)	Gap between segments ending at different points along SR 629
King George	0.32	0.51	Dead End	Hillcrest Drive	US 301 (James Madison Parkway)	
King William	3.88	6.24	Dead End	Sweet Hall Road Seatons Lane Kentucky Road	Dead End	Gap between segments ending at different points along SR 30 Gap between segments ending at different points along SR 625
Lancaster	1.21	1.95	Dead End	King Carter Drive	SR 200 (Irvington Road)	
Lee	1.64	2.64	SR 352/SR 636 (Saint Charles Road)	Bunny Blue Road Unnamed road	Dead End	
Loudoun	1.55	2.49	SR 789 (Lockridge Road)	Moran Road	Dead End	
Louisa	2.30	3.70	US 250 (Broad Street Road)	Three Chopt Road	US 250 (Broad Street Road)	
Lunenburg	2.66	4.28	Mecklenburg County Line	Traffic Road	SR 622 (Rehoboth Road)	
Madison	9.98	16.06	US 15 (James Madison Highway)	Oak Park Road Washington Street Schoolhouse Road	Dead End	
Mathews	0.50	0.80	Dead End	Callis Wharf Road	SR 633 (Old Ferry Road)	
Mecklenburg	3.49	5.62	SR 47	Traffic Road	Lunenburg County Line	
Middlesex	1.00	1.61	SR 33 (General Puller Highway)	Marsh Pungo Road	Dead End	
Montgomery	0.25	0.40	Dead End	Boners Run	SR 609 (Boners Run Road/Boone Road)	
Nelson	11.72	18.86	Dead End	Monocan Drive Adial Road Old Roberts Mountain Road Spring Valley Road	SR 635 (Greenfield Road)	Gap between segments ending at different points along SR 151 Gap between segments ending at different points along SR 6 Gap between a dead end and the Albemarle County Line
New Kent	5.30	8.53	SR 601 (Tabernacle Road)	Windy Lane Polishtown Road	SR 632 (Stage Road)	Gap between a dead end and SR 273
Northampton	5.55	8.93	Dead End	Savage Neck Drive	US 13 Bus	
Northumberland	2.35	3.78	US 360 (Northumberland Highway)	Spring Road Mantua Road	SR 789 (Mantua Road)	
Nottoway	1.14	1.83	US 460	Wellville Road	Dead End	
Orange	0.54	0.87	Madison County Line	Woodberry Forest Road	US 15	
Page	2.10	3.38	SR 635	Unnamed road	Dead End	
Patrick	1.22	1.96	Floyd County Line	Hurricane Ridge Road	SR 602 (Mayberry Church Road)	
Pittsylvania	11.78	18.96	US 29 Bus	Blue Ridge Drive	SR 924 (Hurt Road)	
Powhatan	2.26	3.64	SR 622 (Dorset Road)	Stavemill Road	SR 676 (Urbine Road)	
Prince Edward	3.95	6.36	US 15 (Farmville Road)	New Bethel Road	SR 633 (Mount Pleasant Road/Virso Road)	
Prince George	0.51	0.82	SR 630 (Bull Hill Road)	Allin Road	SR 106 (Courthouse Road)	
Prince William	0.08	0.13	Dumfries Town Limits	Old Stage Coach Road	US 1 (Jefferson Davis Highway)/SR 234 (Dumfries Road)	
Pulaski	0.50	0.80	SR 641 (Cox Hollow Road)	Ponderosa Road	Dead End	
Rappahannock	0.90	1.45	SR 632 (Black Rock Ford Road)	Withers Mill Road	Fauquier County Line	
Richmond	4.61	7.42	Dead End	Naylors Beach Road	SR 624 (Newland Road)	
Roanoke	0.96	1.54	Vinton Town Limits	Hardy Road	Bedford County Line	
Rockbridge	0.30	0.48	Dead End	Brynteg Place	SR 631 (Muddy Lane)	
Rockingham	3.14	5.05	US 340 (East Side Highway)	Sapling Ridge Road Tanyard Bridge Road Huckleberry Road	Dead End	Gap between segments ending at different points along US 33 Gap between segments ending at different points along SR 623
Russell	4.86	7.82	SR 67 (Swords Creek Road)	Pine Creek Road	Buchanan County Line	
Scott	0.80	1.29	SR 632	Unnamed road	SR 614 (Yuma Road)	
Shenandoah	1.67	2.69	SR 635 (Bowman Hill Road)	Pouts Hill Road	SR 635 (Bowman Hill Road)	
Smyth	1.35	2.17	Saltville Town Limits	Allison Gap Road Lick Skillet Road	Dead End	
Southampton	1.40	2.25	SR 606 (Cabin Point Road)	Indian Branch Lane	SR 628 (Wakefield Road)	
Spotsylvania	2.60	4.18	SR 607 (Guinea Station Road)	Flippo Drive	SR 608 (Massaponax Church Road)	
Stafford	0.51	0.82	Dead End	Hemp Road	US 17 (Warrenton Road)	
Surry	7.22	11.62	SR 626 (Beachland Road)	Alliance Road Highgate Road	SR 10 (Colonial Trail)	Gap between segments ending at different points along SR 633
Sussex	12.99	20.91	SR 40 (Sussex Drive)	Princeton Road Old Forty Road Unnamed road	SR 40 (Sussex Drive)	Gap between segments ending at different points along SR 735
Tazewell	0.30	0.48	US 19 Bus	Sunglass Lane	Dead End	
Warren	2.20	3.54	SR 631	Smith Run Road	Dead End	
Washington	1.60	2.57	Dead End	Abrams Falls Road	SR 700 (Rich Valley Road)	
Westmoreland	2.40	3.86	SR 3 (Kings Highway)	Claymont Road Meadow Lane	Dead End	
Wise	7.20	11.59	US 23 (Orby Cantrell Highway)	Bean Gap Road Birchfield Road	Dickenson County Line	
Wythe	6.40	10.30	SR 619 (Austinville Road)	Rickey Road Lots Gap Road	FR-42 (Factory Outlet Drive)	
York	4.94	7.95	US 17 (George Washington Memorial Highway)	Old York Hampton Highway Hornsbyville Road Old York Hampton Highway Surrender Road	SR 704 (Cook Road)	
