= Virginia State Route 638 =

State highway in Virginia, United States

State Route 638

Route information
- Maintained by VDOT

Location
- Country: United States
- State: Virginia

Highway system
- Virginia Routes; Interstate; US; Primary; Secondary; Byways; History; HOT lanes

State Route 638 (SR 638) in the U.S. state of Virginia is a secondary route designation applied to multiple discontinuous road segments among the many counties. The list below describes the sections in each county that are designated SR 638.

== List ==
County	Length (mi)	Length (km)	From	Via	To	Notes
Accomack	8.49	13.66	Dead End	Evans Wharf Road Cashville Road Badger Lane	SR 609 (Brickhouse Drive)	
Albemarle	0.50	0.80	SR 795 (Blenheim Road)	Blacks Lane	Dead End	
Alleghany	0.95	1.53	SR 666 (East Morris Hill Road)	Natural Well Road	SR 687 (Jackson River Road)	
Amelia	1.15	1.85	SR 681 (Pridesville Road)	Eggleston Lane	Dead End	
Amherst	0.32	0.51	Dead End	Ridgecrest Drive	SR 636 (High Peak Road)	
Appomattox	5.20	8.37	SR 727 (Red House Road)	Wheelers Spring Road	Charlotte County Line/SR 630	
Augusta	0.60	0.97	Dead End	Desper Hollow Road	US 250 (Jefferson Highway)	
Bath	0.70	1.13	SR 633	Jonestown Road	SR 635 (Walker Road)	
Bedford	7.70	12.39	SR 640 (Cornelius Road/Gumstock Creek Road)	Sedalia School Road Charlemont Road	SR 644 (Old Cifax Road)	Gap between segments ending at different points along SR 637
Bland	0.47	0.76	SR 629 (Flat Top Road)	Wright Mountain Drive	Dead End	
Botetourt	4.61	7.42	SR 641 (Oak Ridge Road)	Old Hollow Road Trevey Road Pinehaven Road Flowing Spring Road	SR 635 (Timber Ridge)	Gap between segments ending at different points along SR 639 Gap between segments ending at different points along SR 630
Brunswick	4.35	7.00	SR 606 (Belfield Road)	Country Pond Road	SR 634 (Reedy Creek Road)	
Buchanan	20.85	33.55	US 460	Dismal River Road	SR 636	
Buckingham	12.26	19.73	Dead end	Planterstown Road Sanders Creek Road Dixie Hill Road	US 60 (James Anderson Highway)	Gap between segments ending at different points along SR 636 Gap between segments ending at different points along SR 640
Campbell	0.10	0.16	SR 761 (Long Island Road)	Peak Place	SR 633 (Epsons Road)	
Caroline	6.05	9.74	SR 639 (Ladysmith Road)	South River Road	SR 626 (Woodford Road)	
Carroll	19.74	31.77	SR 672 (Huff Hill Road)	Huff Hill Road Hunters Ridge Road Dugspur Road Bellspur Road	SR 600	
Charles City	0.66	1.06	SR 619 (Weyanoke Road)	Mapisco Road	Dead End	
Charlotte	4.20	6.76	Appomattox County Line	Wheelers Spring Road	SR 725	
Chesterfield	7.51	12.09	SR 649 (Newbys Bridge Road)	Cogbill Road	US 1 (Jefferson Davis Highway)	Gap between a dead end and SR 637
Clarke	3.41	5.49	Warren County Line	Howellsville Road	US 50 (John S Mosby Highway)	
Craig	1.04	1.67	Dead End	Unnamed road	SR 659	
Culpeper	4.50	7.24	US 522 (Sperryville Pike)	Cherry Hill Road Alum Springs Road	SR 633 (Drogheda Mountain Road)	Gap between segments ending at different points along SR 729
Cumberland	8.19	13.18	SR 45 (Cumberland Road)	John Randolph Road Guinea Road	SR 600 (River Road/Stoney Point Road)	
Dickenson	1.40	2.25	Dead End	Unnamed road	SR 637	
Dinwiddie	3.20	5.15	SR 613 (Gills Bridge Road)	Harpers Road	SR 612 (Harpers Bridge Road)	
Essex	1.00	1.61	US 17 (Tidewater Trail)	Wheatland Road	Dead End	
Fairfax	8.20	13.20	US 1 (Richmond Highway)	Pohick Road Rolling Road	SR 620 (Braddock Road)	Gap between segments ending at different points along SR 286
Fauquier	1.15	1.85	Dead End	Cherry Hill Road Harrels Corner Road	Warren County Line	
Floyd	0.40	0.64	Franklin County Line	Walnut Knob Road	SR 888 (Cypress Drive)	
Fluvanna	0.60	0.97	SR 6 (East River Road)	Old Rectory Lane	Dead End	
Franklin	1.25	2.01	Dead End	Walnut Knob Road	Floyd County Line	
Frederick	4.30	6.92	US 11 (Valley Pike)	Vancluse Road Clark Road	SR 628 (Middle Road)	Gap between segments ending at different points along SR 625
Giles	1.70	2.74	SR 100 (Pulaski Giles Turnpike)	Hilltop Road	Dead End	
Gloucester	0.70	1.13	Dead End	Blakes View Road	SR 643 (Mark Pine Road)	
Goochland	0.27	0.43	Dead End	Soldiers Lodge Road	SR 639 (Sheppard Town Road)	
Grayson	3.20	5.15	SR 94 (Riverside Drive)	Lime Kiln Road Lime Kiln Lane	SR 94 (Scenic Road)	
Greene	4.70	7.56	US 33 (Spotswood Trail)	Turkey Ridge Road Teel Mountain Road	SR 667 (Middle River Road)	Gap between segments ending at different points along SR 637
Greensville	1.95	3.14	SR 730 (Low Ground Road)	Newsome Lane Unnamed road	Dead End	
Halifax	6.99	11.25	SR 40 (Stage Coach Road)	Bull Creek Road Perth Road	US 501 (L P Bailey Memorial Highway)	Gap between segments ending at different points along SR 40
Hanover	4.66	7.50	US 360 Bus (Mechanicsville Turnpike)/SR 156	Atlee Road	SR 637 (Atlee Station Road)	
Henry	0.94	1.51	SR 782 (Old Sand Road)	Pulaski Road Juggle Road	SR 640 (Old Mill Road)	Gap between segments ending at different points along SR 639
Highland	1.00	1.61	SR 640 (Meadowdale Road)	Unnamed road	SR 637	
Isle of Wight	5.52	8.88	SR 645 (Yellow Hammer Road)	Mill Creek Drive Cut Thru Road Clydesdale Drive	US 258 (Courthouse Highway)	
King and Queen	0.20	0.32	SR 620 (Powcan Road)	Aspen Hill Road	SR 620 (Powcan Road)	
King George	0.20	0.32	SR 3 (Kings Highway)	Hudson Road	Dead End	
King William	0.10	0.16	Dead End	Mangohick Church Road	SR 30 (King William Road)	
Lancaster	2.40	3.86	Dead End	Cherry Point Road Cherry Point Drive Blueberry Point Road Unnamed road	Dead End	Gap between segments ending at different points along SR 3
Lee	2.00	3.22	US 58 (Daniel Boone Trail)	Hickory Flats Road	SR 642 (Fannon Road)	
Loudoun	1.92	3.09	SR 637 (Cascades Parkway)	Maries Road Unnamed road	SR 28 (Sully Road)	
Louisa	2.47	3.98	SR 640 (Jack Jouett Road)	Nolting Road	SR 22 (Louisa Road)	
Lunenburg	3.40	5.47	SR 138 (South Hill Road)	Stone Mill Road Iron Clad Road	SR 620 (Old Poole Road)	Gap between segments ending at different points along SR 602
Madison	4.53	7.29	Dead End	Double Run Road Hebron Church Road	US 29 (Seminole Trail)	Gap between segments ending at different points along SR 231 (Blue Ridge Turnpike)
Mathews	1.00	1.61	Dead End	Gum Thicket Road	SR 633 (Old Ferry Road)	
Mecklenburg	2.86	4.60	Dead End	Burnt Store Road Wilson Road Skelton Station Road	Dead End	Gap between segments ending at different points along US 1 Gap between segments ending at different points along SR 639
Middlesex	0.30	0.48	SR 33 (General Puller Highway)	Christchurch Drive	SR 33 (General Puller Highway)	
Montgomery	3.50	5.63	SR 639 (Mount Pleasant Road)	Georges Run	SR 637 (Alleghany Springs Road)	
Nelson	1.87	3.01	SR 6/SR 151	Avon Road	SR 6/SR 151	
New Kent	4.30	6.92	SR 611 (South Quaker Road)	Cosby Mill Road	Hanover County Line	
Northampton	0.66	1.06	SR 639 (Sunnyside Road)	Mill Street	Dead End	
Northumberland	2.40	3.86	SR 604 (Dodlyt Road)	Coan Church Road	SR 612 (Coan Stage Road)	
Nottoway	0.17	0.27	SR 676 (Fourth Street)	Plum Street	SR 637 (Sixth Street)	
Orange	8.20	13.20	SR 612 (Monrovia Road)	Mountain Track Road	SR 647 (Old Gordonsville Road)	
Page	10.28	16.54	SR 650 (River Road/Grove Hill River Road)	Honeyville Road Aylor Grubbs Avenue Mill Creek Road	Luray Town Line	Gap between segments ending at different points along SR 622 Gap between segments ending at different points along US 340 Bus
Patrick	0.78	1.26	Carroll County Line	Bell Spur Road	SR 614 (Squirrel Spur Road)	
Pittsylvania	10.46	16.83	SR 924 (Pocket Road)	Harbor Drive Roark Mill Road Spaniel Road	SR 668 (Level Run Road)	Gap between SR 988 and US 29 Bus Gap between segments ending at different points along SR 640
Powhatan	0.75	1.21	Dead End	Gills Road	SR 13 (Old Buckingham Road)	
Prince Edward	1.73	2.78	Farmville Town Limits	Persimmon Tree Fork Road	Dead End	
Prince George	6.25	10.06	Sussex County Line	Templeton Road	SR 156 (Prince George Drive)	
Prince William	5.36	8.63	SR 2000 (Opitz Boulevard)	Potomac Center Boulevard Neabsco Mills Road Blackburn Road Colchester Road	Dead End	
Pulaski	0.38	0.61	Dead End	Caddell Road	US 11 (Lee Highway)	
Rappahannock	2.50	4.02	SR 729 (Ben Venue Road)	Grimsley Road	SR 647 (Crest Hill Road)	
Richmond	7.80	12.55	Dead End	Jones Creek Road Oak Row Road China Hill Road	SR 624 (Newland Road)	Gap between segments ending at different points along SR 622
Roanoke	0.35	0.56	SR 639 (Harborwood Road)	Creekside Drive	SR 639 (West Riverside Drive)	
Rockbridge	4.22	6.79	SR 641	Unnamed road	Dead End	Gap between segments ending at different points along SR 631
Rockingham	0.88	1.42	SR 759 (Newtown Road)	Samuels Road	Dead End	
Russell	0.80	1.29	SR 637 (Thomason Creek Road)	Unnamed road	Dead End	
Scott	6.07	9.77	SR 600 (Fairview Road)	Purchase Ridge Road Powell Mountain Road	US 58 (Duff Pat Highway)	
Shenandoah	3.12	5.02	Dead End	Junction Road	Strasburg Town Limits	
Smyth	6.12	9.85	SR 645	Chestnut Ridge Road Unnamed road	SR 637 (Carlock Creek Road)	Gap between segments ending at different points along US 11
Southampton	5.28	8.50	SR 611 (Flaggy Run Road)	Drake Road	SR 603 (Unity Road)	Gap between segments ending at different points along SR 640
Spotsylvania	1.92	3.09	SR 636 (Mine Road)	Lansdowne Road	Fredericksburg City Limits	
Stafford	0.19	0.31	US 1 (Jefferson Davis Highway)	Little Forest Church Road	Dead End	
Surry	1.34	2.16	SR 10 (Colonial Trail)	Timberneck Road	Dead End	
Sussex	1.50	2.41	SR 602 (Cabin Point Road)	Zion Road	Prince George County Line	
Warren	15.37	24.74	Fauquier County Line	Unnamed road Howellsville Road	Clarke County Line	
Washington	0.24	0.39	US 58 (Jeb Stuart Highway)	Lacy Drive	US 58 (Jeb Stuart Highway)	
Westmoreland	5.75	9.25	SR 637 (Rappahannock Road/Leedstown Road)	Leedstown Road Ferry Landing	SR 205 (James Monroe Highway)	Gap between SR 3 and SR 205
Wise	1.48	2.38	SR 632	McFall Fork Road	Dead End	
Wythe	1.27	2.04	Dead End	Felts Lane	SR 94 (Ivanhoe Road)	
