= Virginia State Route 627 =

State highway in Virginia, United States

State Route 627

Route information
- Maintained by VDOT

Location
- Country: United States
- State: Virginia

Highway system
- Virginia Routes; Interstate; US; Primary; Secondary; Byways; History; HOT lanes

State Route 627 (SR 627) in the U.S. state of Virginia is a secondary route designation applied to multiple discontinuous road segments among the many counties. The list below describes the sections in each county that are designated SR 627.

== List ==
County	Length (mi)	Length (km)	From	Via	To	Notes
Accomack	1.33	2.14	SR 718 (Bobtown Road)	Killmontown Road	SR 609 (Beacon Road)	
Albemarle	19.21	30.92	James River/Buckingham County Line	Warren Ferry Road James River Road Porters Road Green Mountain Road Frys Path Carters Mountain Road	SR 795 (James Monroe Highway)	Gap between segments ending at different points along SR 20
Alleghany	0.34	0.55	Dead End	North Oakwood Drive	SR 1401 (Cliftwood Circle)	
Amelia	3.81	6.13	SR 38 (Five Forks Road)	Cheatham Road	US 360 (Patrick Henry Highway)	
Amherst	4.20	6.76	SR 617 (Poorhouse Farm Road)	Mollys Mountain Road Dug Hill Road	SR 778 (Lowesville Road)	Gap between segments ending at different points along SR 625
Appomattox	11.64	18.73	SR 24 (Old Courthouse Road)	River Ridge Road Hixburg Road	Prince Edward County Line	
Augusta	0.38	0.61	Dead End	Tinkling Spring Drive	SR 285 (Tinkling Spring Road)	
Bath	5.10	8.21	SR 629 (Deerfield Road)	Scotch Town Draft	SR 678 (Indian Draft)	
Bedford	2.78	4.47	Dead End	Echo Forest Way Preston Mill Road	SR 24 (Wyatts Way)	
Bland	0.80	1.29	Dead End	Dalton Hollow Road	SR 612 (Kimberling Road)	
Botetourt	0.40	0.64	Dead End	Red Horse Lane	SR 617 (Newtown Road/Schoolhouse Road)	
Brunswick	0.63	1.01	Dead End	Fresh Meadows Road	SR 715 (Iron Bridge Road)	
Buchanan	8.60	13.84	SR 83	Dry Fork	SR 624	
Buckingham	5.50	8.85	SR 602 (Howardsville Road)	Axtell Road Warren Ferry Road	Albemarle County Line	
Campbell	3.80	6.12	SR 695 (Johnson Creek Road)	Camping Springs Road Wileman Road Saddle Road	SR 712 (Mount Herman Road)	Gap between segments ending at different points along SR 682
Caroline	12.20	19.63	SR 721 (Sparta Road)	Mattaponi Trail	King and Queen County Line	
Carroll	1.90	3.06	SR 638 (Dugspur Road)	Adams Branch Road Caroline Road	Floyd County Line	
Charles City	1.80	2.90	SR 623 (Wilcox Neck Road)	Old Neck Road	Dead End	
Charlotte	3.20	5.15	Dead End	Shelton Hall Road Tate Mill Road	SR 605 (Rutledge Road)	Gap between segments ending at different points along US 15
Chesterfield	2.88	4.63	SR 628 (Hickory Road)	Woodpecker Road Chestnut Ridge Road	Dead End	
Clarke	1.90	3.06	SR 622 (Bordens Spring Road)	Carters Line Road	SR 658 (White Post Road)	
Craig	1.10	1.77	SR 628 (Simmonsville Road)	Valley Roller Mill Road	SR 629 (Northside Road)	
Culpeper	2.00	3.22	SR 729 (Eggbornsville Road)	Homeland Road	SR 640 (Monumental Mills Road/Docs Road)	
Cumberland	1.30	2.09	SR 622 (Bear Creek Lake Road)	Barter Hill Road	SR 622 (Bear Creek Lake Road)	
Dickenson	10.41	16.75	Russell County Line	Unnamed road Long Ridge	SR 651	
Dinwiddie	10.72	17.25	US 1 (Boydton Plank Road)	Courthouse Road Trinity Church Road	SR 611 (Wilkinson Road)	Gap between segments ending at different points along SR 751
Essex	13.94	22.43	Caroline County Line	Mount Landing Road Airport Road	US 17	Formerly SR 215
Fairfax	1.31	2.11	SR 629 (Fort Hunt Road)	Elkin Street Riverside Road	SR 628 (Collingwood Road)	
Fauquier	1.50	2.41	SR 626 (Halfway Road)	Hulberts Lane Parsons Road	Loudoun County Line	
Floyd	0.90	1.45	Carroll County Line	Rocky Ridge Road	SR 758 (Buffalo Mountain Road)	
Fluvanna	0.65	1.05	US 250/SR 698	Zion Road	Louisa County Line	
Franklin	0.65	1.05	SR 969 (Danville Turnpike)	Old Chapel Road	SR 890 (Snow Creek Road)	
Frederick	7.14	11.49	Warren County Line	Reliance Road First Street Chapel Road First Street Chapel Road Unnamed road	Dead End	Gap between segments ending at different points along US 11
Giles	1.12	1.80	SR 635 (Big Stoney Creek Road)	Darnell Mountain Road	Dead End	
Gloucester	1.00	1.61	SR 628 (Crockett Lane)	Cunningham Lane White Hall Road	SR 626 (Baileys Wharf Road)	
Goochland	1.35	2.17	SR 600 (Rock Castle Road)	Ben Lomond Road	Dead End	
Grayson	0.25	0.40	Dead End	Hillfalls Road	SR 626 (Little River Road)	
Greene	5.39	8.67	Shenandoah National Park boundary	Bacon Hollow Road	SR 810 (Dyke Road)	
Greensville	14.19	22.84	North Carolina State Line	Brink Road	Emporia City Limits	
Halifax	2.40	3.86	SR 603 (Lenning Road)	Armistead Road	SR 644 (Stoney Ridge Road)	
Hanover	8.97	14.44	Henrico County Line	Meadowbridge Road Pole Green Road	US 360 (Mechanicsville Turnpike)	
Henry	7.00	11.27	Patrick County Line	Wilson Mill Road Wingfield Orchard Drive Hodges Farm Road	SR 683 (The Great Road)	
Highland	0.30	0.48	Dead End	Unnamed road	US 220	
Isle of Wight	2.80	4.51	SR 626 (Mill Swamp Road)	Moonlight Road	Surry County Line	
James City	0.05	0.08	SR 694 (Lake Drive)	Malvern Circle	Dead End	
King and Queen	2.04	3.28	Caroline County Line	Roundabout Route Road	SR 721 (Newtown Road)	
King George	5.36	8.63	Dead End	Wilmont Road Kings Mill Road	SR 628 (Stoney Knoll Road)	
King William	1.00	1.61	SR 30 (King William Road)	Saint Johns Church Road	Dead End	
Lancaster	1.60	2.57	SR 626 (Towles Point Road)	Chownings Ferry Road	SR 354 (River Road)	
Lee	0.36	0.58	SR 606	Stewart Road	Dead End	
Loudoun	4.60	7.40	Fauquier County Line	Parsons Road Carters Farm Lane	SR 734 (Snickersville Turnpike)	Gap between segments ending at different points along US 50
Louisa	1.73	2.78	SR 615 (Columbia Road/Zion Road)	Zion Road	Fluvanna County Line	
Lunenburg	3.57	5.75	SR 645 (Jonesboro Road)	Mill Creek Drive Dobbins Road	Nottoway County Line	Gap between segments ending at different points along SR 615
Madison	0.60	0.97	SR 634 (Oak Park Road)	Dark Run Lane	Dead End	
Mathews	0.30	0.48	SR 198	Smithers Road	Dead End	
Mecklenburg	1.64	2.64	SR 618 (Marengo Road)	Gaulding Road	SR 620 (Hall Road)	
Middlesex	1.10	1.77	SR 625 (Barricks Mill Road)	Mill Wharf Road	Dead End	
Montgomery	0.40	0.64	SR 600 (Tyler Road)	Barn Road	SR 658 (Meadow Creek Road)	
Nelson	5.25	8.45	Dead End	Spruce Creek Lane Glenthorne Loop Gullysville Lane	Dead End	
New Kent	10.44	16.80	SR 1001 (Cypress Drive)	Riverside Drive Waterside Drive Stage Road	SR 249 (New Kent Highway)	
Northampton	2.31	3.72	SR 618 (Bayside Road)	Young Street Machipongo Drive Box Tree Drive	Dead End	Gap between segments ending at different points along US 13
Northumberland	2.18	3.51	Dead End	Honest Point Road Lake Landing Road	Dead End	Gap between segments ending at different points along SR 614
Nottoway	1.21	1.95	Lunenburg County Line	Dobbins Bridge Road	SR 40 (Kenbridge Road)	
Orange	5.30	8.53	SR 615 (Rapidan Road)	Clarks Mountain Road	SR 617 (Everona Road)	
Page	1.00	1.61	Dead End	Jordon Hollow Road	SR 626 (Hawksbille Park Road/Alshire Hollow Road)	
Patrick	5.83	9.38	SR 687 (Microfilm Road/Pleasant View Drive)	Egg Farm Road County Line Road	SR 628 (South County Road)	
Pittsylvania	3.30	5.31	SR 938 (Meadows Road)	Upper Mountain Road	SR 683 (Johnson Mill Road)	
Powhatan	3.60	5.79	SR 13 (Old Buckingham Road)	Ridge Road	US 60	
Prince Edward	0.79	1.27	US 460 (Prince Edward Highway)	Prince Edward Drive	Dead End	
Prince George	7.88	12.68	Sussex County Line	Loving Union Road Pumphouse Road	SR 630 (Golf Course Road)	
Prince William	1.59	2.56	Dead End	Van Buren Road	SR 738 (Old Stage Road)	
Pulaski	5.47	8.80	SR 100 (Clebone Road)	Highland Road	SR 600 (Belspring Road)	
Rappahannock	2.70	4.35	SR 626 (Tiger Valley Road)	Long Mountain Road	US 211/US 522 (Lee Highway)	
Richmond	2.20	3.54	SR 619 (Mulberry Road)	Drinking Swamp Road	SR 661 (Totuskey Church Road)	
Roanoke	0.03	0.05	SR 601 (Hollins Road)	Shadwell Drive	SR 605 (Sanderson Drive)	
Rockbridge	3.75	6.04	SR 850 (Midland Trail)	Sycamore Valley Drive	Dead End	
Rockingham	0.30	0.48	SR 628 (Beldor Road)	Powells Gap Road	Dead End	
Russell	1.64	2.64	Dickenson County Line	Saw Mill Hollow	SR 63 (Dante Road)	
Scott	23.05	37.10	Tennessee State Line	Unnamed road Reed Hollow Road	SR 72 (Veterans Memorial Highway)	Gap between segments ending at different points along SR 619
Shenandoah	0.33	0.53	SR 614 (South Middle Road)	Third Hill Lane	Dead End	
Smyth	0.20	0.32	Dead End	Unnamed road	SR 628 (Cussing Hollow Road)	
Southampton	0.90	1.45	SR 635 (Black Creek Road)	One Mile Road	SR 603 (Unity Road)	
Spotsylvania	6.19	9.96	SR 613 (Brock Road)	Gordon Road	SR 3 (Plank Road)	
Stafford	11.97	19.26	US 1 (Jefferson Davis Highway)	Forbes Street Mountain View Road	SR 616 (Poplar Road)	Gap between SR 624 and a Cul-de-Sac
Surry	4.30	6.92	Isle of Wight County Line	Mantura Road	SR 628 (Burnt Mill Road)	
Sussex	2.21	3.56	SR 35 (Jerusalem Plank Road)	Baxter Road	Prince George County Line	
Tazewell	9.60	15.45	SR 631 (Baptist Valley Road/Indian Creek Road)	Brandy Road	West Virginia State Line	
Warren	4.60	7.40	Frederick County Line	Reliance Road	US 522 (Winchester Road)	
Washington	7.20	11.59	Dead End	Wolf Run Road Haskell Station Road Cowan Drive	SR 641 (Camp Ground Road)	Gap between segments ending at different points along SR 700 Gap between segments ending at different points along SR 633
Westmoreland	0.50	0.80	SR 600 (Neenah Road)	Pierce Lane	Dead End	
Wise	2.45	3.94	Dead End	Donald Branch Road Unnamed road	Dead End	Gap between segments ending at different points along SR 620
Wythe	2.10	3.38	US 52 (Fort Chiswell Road)	Archer Road	SR 629 (Red Hollow Road)	
York	0.54	0.87	SR 622 (Seaford Road)	Woods Road Landing Road	Dead End	Gap between segments ending at different points along SR 718
