= Virginia State Route 652 =

State highway in Virginia, United States

State Route 652

Route information
- Maintained by VDOT

Location
- Country: United States
- State: Virginia

Highway system
- Virginia Routes; Interstate; US; Primary; Secondary; Byways; History; HOT lanes

State Route 652 (SR 652) in the U.S. state of Virginia is a secondary route designation applied to multiple discontinuous road segments among the many counties. The list below describes the sections in each county that are designated SR 652.

== List ==
County	Length (mi)	Length (km)	From	Via	To	Notes
Accomack	2.49	4.01	US 13 Bus	Joynes Neck Road	Dead End	
Albemarle	1.12	1.80	SR 631 (Rio Road East)	Old Brook Road Westmoreland Road	SR 854 (Carrsbrook Drive)	
Alleghany	0.70	1.13	Dead End	Crowder Hollow Road	SR 18 (Potts Creek Road)	
Amelia	0.88	1.42	SR 616 (Genito Road)	Kennons Lane	Dead End	
Amherst	5.69	9.16	SR 657 (Cedar Gate Road/Laurel Cliff Road)	Unnamed road Monacan Park Road	Dead End	Gap between segments ending at different points along SR 130
Appomattox	2.00	3.22	Campbell County line	Beeks Lane	SR 648 (Reedy Spring Road)	
Augusta	7.42	11.94	Dead End	Wilda Road University Farm Road Guthrie Road	SR 608 (Tinkling Spring Road)	Gap between segments ending at different points along SR 657 Gap between segments ending at different points along US 340
Bath	0.72	1.16	Dead End	Elks Camp Road	SR 631 (Indian Hill Road)	
Bedford	2.83	4.55	SR 657 (Rocky Mountain Road)	Walker Road	US 501 (Lee Jackson Highway)	
Bland	0.05	0.08	Dead End	Fernwood Drive	SR 628 (Eagles Road)	
Botetourt	6.70	10.78	US 11 (Lee Highway)	Mountain Pass Road Short Road	SR 661 (Colonial Road)	Gap between segments ending at different points along US 221/US 460
Brunswick	7.63	12.28	SR 617 (Blue Bird Road)	Foundry Creek Road Chalk Level Road	Alberta town limits	Gap between segments ending at different points along SR 644
Buchanan	8.75	14.08	Dead End	Unnamed road	West Virginia state line	Gap between segments ending at different points along SR 643
Buckingham	12.30	19.79	US 15 (James Madison Highway)	Bridgeport Road	SR 20 (Constitution Route)	
Campbell	6.25	10.06	SR 635 (Flynn Street)	Morningside Drive Pigeon Run Road	SR 648 (Suck Creek Road)	Gap between segments ending at different points along SR 761
Caroline	15.87	25.54	SR 651 (Baylor Road)	Riva Road Meadow Farm Road Signboard Road Ruther Glen Road Signboard Road Cool Water Drive	US 1 (Jefferson Davis Highway)	Gap between segments ending at different points along SR 30
Carroll	1.30	2.09	SR 654 (Laurel Fork Road)	Hereford Road	SR 638 (Dugspur Road)	
Charles City	0.31	0.50	Dead End	Wian Lane	SR 106 (Roxbury Road)	
Charlotte	5.10	8.21	SR 654 (Mount Harmony Road)	Eureka Mill Road Briery Road	Prince Edward County line	
Chesterfield	4.87	7.84	SR 76 (Powhite Parkway)	Old Hundred Road	US 60 (Midlothian Turnpike)	
Clarke	2.40	3.86	SR 620 (Pyletown Road)	Unnamed road	SR 657 (Senseny Road)	
Craig	0.34	0.55	SR 665 (Kanawha Street)	Holcombe Avenue	New Castle town limits	
Culpeper	6.92	11.14	SR 649 (Cedar Mountain Drive)	Mitchell Road	US 522 (Zachary Taylor Highway)	Gap between segments ending at different points along US 522
Cumberland	0.10	0.16	SR 632 (CA IRA Road)	CA IRA Road	US 60 (Anderson Highway)	
Dickenson	22.47	36.16	Wise County line	Dr Ralph Stanley Highway Unnamed road Dyers Chapel Road Dog Branch Gap Road Nealy Ridge Road Turkey Branch Road Unnamed road Backbone Ridge Road	SR 83	Gap between segments ending at different points along SR 63
Dinwiddie	1.56	2.51	SR 644 (Depot Road)	Asbury Road	US 1 (Boydton Plank Road)	
Essex	1.40	2.25	US 17 (Tidewater Trail)	Eastern View Road	Dead End	
Fairfax	4.22	6.79	SR 638 (Rolling Road)	Burke Road Guinea Road Twinbrook Road Burke Station Road	Fairfax city limits	Gap between segments ending at different points along SR 645 Two gaps between segments ending at different points along SR 651 Gap between segments ending at different points along SR 620
Fauquier	3.23	5.20	SR 215 (Vint Hill Road)	Kennedy Road	Prince William County line	Gap between dead ends
Floyd	1.00	1.61	SR 758 (Camp Five Road)	Gardner Road	SR 762 (Dusty Mile Road)	
Fluvanna	1.67	2.69	SR 654 (Cloverdale Road)	Academy Road	US 15 (James Madison Highway)	
Franklin	6.90	11.10	SR 890 (Snow Creek Road)	Circle Creek Road	Pittsylvania County line	
Frederick	1.74	2.80	SR 628 (Middle Road)	Apple Valley Road Shawnee Drive	Winchester city limits	Gap between segments ending at different points along US 11
Giles	0.60	0.97	Dead End	Northview Street	Narrows town limits	
Gloucester	2.70	4.35	SR 649 (Maryus Road)	Guinea Court Rowes Point Road	Dead End	Gap between segments ending at different points along SR 653
Goochland	0.15	0.24	SR 45 (Cartersville Road)	Dadneys Road	SR 618 (Whittcamp Road)	
Grayson	3.60	5.79	SR 660 (Carsonville Road)	Briar Patch Mountain Road	SR 651 (Leafwood Road)	
Greene	0.19	0.31	Dead End	Sassafras Lane	US 33 (Spotswood Trail)	
Greensville	0.24	0.39	Dead End	Inge Avenue Unnamed road	Dead End	
Halifax	1.96	3.15	Dead End	Academy Street Crawford Road	SR 360 (Mountain Road)	
Hanover	1.78	2.86	SR 638 (Atlee Road)	Cool Spring Road	SR 643 (New Ashcake Road)	
Henry	1.00	1.61	Dead End	Pine Meadow Lane	SR 651 (North Fork Road)	
Highland	0.20	0.32	US 250	Unnamed road Academy Hill Road Unnamed road	Dead End	
Isle of Wight	9.60	15.45	SR 600 (Woodland Drive)	Bob White Road Harry Wilson Road Comet Road	SR 681 (Raynor Road)	Gap between segments ending at different points along US 258 Gap between segments ending at different points along SR 620
James City	0.61	0.98	SR 1476 (Burnley Drive)	Stanley Drive	SR 5 (John Tyler Memorial Highway)	
King and Queen	2.00	3.22	SR 721 (Newtown Road)	Vessels Road	SR 721 (Newtown Road)	
King George	0.58	0.93	US 301 (James Madison Parkway)	Roseland Road	Dead End	
King William	2.98	4.80	SR 615 (Nelsons Bridge Road)	Mahixon Road	SR 604 (Dabneys Mill Road)	
Lancaster	0.28	0.45	SR 638/SR 1204 (Boles Avenue)	Shady Lane	SR 639 (Beach Road)	
Lee	2.76	4.44	US 58 (Daniel Boone Heritage Highway)	Campground Road	SR 659 (Sugar Run Road)	
Loudoun	0.60	0.97	Dead End	Gant Road	SR 653 (Cochran Mill Road)	
Louisa	10.98	17.67	SR 701 (Eastham Road/Borden Road)	Kentucky Springs Road	SR 208 (New Bridge Road)	
Lunenburg	8.33	13.41	SR 655 (Plank Road)	Oakes Road Ashton Road Marshall Town Road	SR 49 (Earl Davis Gregory Highway)	Gap between segments ending at different points along SR 40 Gap between segments ending at different points along SR 653
Madison	6.90	11.10	US 29 Bus (Main Street)	Ruth Road Gear Mountain Road Horn Hollow Lane	Dead End	Gap between segments ending at different points along SR 651
Mathews	0.40	0.64	Dead End	Lewis Lane	SR 626 (Hallieford Road)	
Mecklenburg	4.79	7.71	Dead End	Callis Road Wagon Wheel Road	Dead End	Gap between segments ending at different points along SR 47
Middlesex	0.50	0.80	SR 33 (General Puller Highway)	Crittenden Road	Dead End	
Montgomery	7.31	11.76	SR 625 (Big Falls Road)	McCoy Road	SR 685 (Prices Fork Road)	
Nelson	1.15	1.85	Dead End	Wills Lane	SR 653 (Oak Ridge Road)	
New Kent	0.18	0.29	US 60 (Pocahontas Trail)	Eastview Lane	US 60 (Pocahontas Trail)	
Northampton	1.62	2.61	US 13 Bus (Main Street)	Cathey Avenue Broadwater Road	SR 183 (Occohannock Neck Road)	
Northumberland	1.72	2.77	US 360 (Northumberland Highway)	Sunny Bank Road Gaskins Beach Road	SR 802 (Tranquility Road)	Gap between segments ending at different points along SR 644
Nottoway	0.40	0.64	Dead End	Hawthorne Drive	SR 609 (Yellowbird Road)	
Orange	1.40	2.25	US 33 (Spotswood Trail)	Woodroof Road	Dead End	
Page	3.75	6.04	US 211 (Lee Highway)	Unnamed road	Luray town limits	
Patrick	2.84	4.57	SR 631 (Wayside Road)	Shingle Shop Road	SR 8 (Salem Highway)	
Pittsylvania	2.60	4.18	Franklin County line	Cavalry Road	SR 969 (Sago Road)	
Powhatan	1.17	1.88	SR 711 (Robius Road)	Watkins Landing Road	Dead End	
Prince Edward	5.46	8.79	US 460 (Prince Edward Highway)	Harris Creek Road	SR 626 (Peaks Road)	
Prince George	0.04	0.06	Dead End	Allison Lane	SR 648 (Clary Road)	
Prince William	4.52	7.27	Fauquier County line	Fitzwater Drive	SR 646 (Aden Road)	Gap between segments ending at different points along SR 604
Pulaski	3.11	5.01	FR-47 (Kirby Road)	Unnamed road Graham Road Barrett Ridge Road	SR 654 (Old Baltimore Road)	Gap between segments ending at different points along SR 100
Rappahannock	0.75	1.21	Dead End	Poortown Road	SR 231 (F T Valley Road)	
Richmond	1.60	2.57	Dead End	Waterview Road	SR 636 (Strangeway Road)	
Roanoke	0.21	0.34	SR 675 (Indian Grave Road)	Enchanted Lane	Dead End	
Rockbridge	0.50	0.80	SR 770 (Turnpike Road)	Lake Robertson Drive	Dead End	
Rockingham	2.70	4.35	SR 672 (Pineville Road)	Three Springs Road Lethe Lane	Dead End	
Russell	2.50	4.02	SR 640 (River Mountain Road)	Chestnut Road	SR 651 (Hubbard Town Road)	
Scott	3.71	5.97	SR 653 (Mabe Stanleytown Road)	Unnamed road	SR 649 (Rye Cove Memorial Road)	
Shenandoah	4.59	7.39	Dead End	Jadwyn Road	SR 655 (Harrisville Road)	Gap between segments ending at different points along SR 600 Gap between segments ending at different points along SR 642
Smyth	0.50	0.80	Dead End	Rosenbaum Hollow Road	SR 605 (Wet Springs Road)	
Southampton	20.30	32.67	SR 661 (Old Church Road)	Barham Hill Road Old Belfield Road Buckhorn Road	SR 651 (Indian Town Road)	Gap between segments ending at different points along SR 653
Spotsylvania	3.10	4.99	SR 719 (Days Bridge Road)	Belmont Road	SR 601 (Lawyers Road)	
Stafford	6.76	10.88	US 1 (Jefferson Davis Highway)	Truslow Road	SR 616 (Poplar Road)	
Surry	0.13	0.21	SR 637 (Pleasant Point Road)	Chanco Drive	Dead End	
Sussex	0.79	1.27	US 460 (General Mahone Highway)	Fredericksburg Road Unnamed road Fredenburg Road	US 460	
Tazewell	0.11	0.18	SR 741 (Rodriguez Street)	Hillview Drive	Dead End	
Warren	0.18	0.29	SR 656	Little Loop Road	SR 656	
Washington	0.20	0.32	SR 609 (Plum Creek Road)	Sharon Lane	SR 753 (Washington Spring Road)	
Westmoreland	0.62	1.00	SR 628 (Pomona Road)	Charles Way	Dead End	
Wise	4.42	7.11	SR 72	Ralph Stanley Highway	Dickenson County line	
Wythe	4.00	6.44	SR 667 (Old Stage Road)	Johnny Lane Cinnamon Run Road Unnamed road	US 21 (Grayson Turnpike)	
York	0.42	0.68	SR 718 (Back Creek Road)	Claxton Creek Road	Dead End	
