= Virginia State Route 644 =

State highway in Virginia, United States

State Route 644

Route information
- Maintained by VDOT

Location
- Country: United States
- State: Virginia

Highway system
- Virginia Routes; Interstate; US; Primary; Secondary; Byways; History; HOT lanes

State Route 644 (SR 644) in the U.S. state of Virginia is a secondary route designation applied to multiple discontinuous road segments among the many counties. The list below describes the sections in each county that are designated SR 644.

== List ==
County	Length (mi)	Length (km)	From	Via	To	Notes
Accomack	1.40	2.25	SR 672 (Fair Oaks Road)	Rose Cottage Road	Dead End	
Albemarle	0.60	0.97	SR 641 (Burnley Station Road)	Burnley Road	Orange County line	
Alleghany	0.03	0.05	SR 645 (Westwood Drive)	Moffitt Street	US 60 (Midland Trail)	
Amelia	7.80	12.55	SR 681 (Clementown Road)	Rocky Ford Road Fowlkes Bridge Road	SR 621 (Reed Rock Road)	Gap between segments ending at different points along SR 616
Amherst	3.70	5.95	SR 647 (Minors Branch Road)	Ramsey Road	SR 643 (Ashebey Woods Road)	
Appomattox	7.66	12.33	Campbell County line	Hancock Road Fox Ridge Road Cub Creek Lane Gum Branch Road	Dead End	Gap between segments ending at different points along SR 694 Gap between segments ending at different points along SR 727
Augusta	0.79	1.27	US 11 (Greenville Avenue)	Frontier Drive	Staunton city limits	
Bath	0.10	0.16	SR 615 (Bacova Junction Highway/Main Street)	Broadhead School Road	SR 674 (Mill Race Lane)	
Bedford	19.87	31.98	SR 43 (Peaks Road)	Fancy Farm Road Centerville Road Lankford Mill Road Old Cifax Road Coffee Road	Lynchburg city limits	
Bland	0.40	0.64	Dead End	Niday Drive	SR 61 (Wolf Creek Highway)	
Botetourt	1.16	1.87	SR 645 (Fringer Trail)	Ellis Run Lane	SR 645 (Fringer Trail)	
Brunswick	28.08	45.19	North Carolina state line	Elam Road Robinson Ferry Road Grandy Road Brunswick Drive Little Deer Road Brunswick Drive Little Deer Road	SR 616 (Lew Jones Road)	Gap between segments ending at different points along SR 626 Gap between segments ending at different points along SR 643
Buchanan	2.00	3.22	Dead End	Hunts Fork Road	SR 645 (Paw Paw Road)	
Buckingham	3.00	4.83	SR 24	Bridge Road	SR 638 (Dixie Hill Road)	
Campbell	0.50	0.80	Charlotte County line	Hancock Road	Appomattox County line	
Caroline	4.20	6.76	SR 627 (Mattaponi Trail)	Bagby Road	SR 721 (Newtown Road)	
Carroll	0.70	1.13	SR 640 (Keno Road)	Hollow Tree Road	SR 645 (Stone Mountain Road)	
Charles City	0.45	0.72	SR 5 (John Tyler Memorial Highway)	Courthouse Road	SR 5 (John Tyler Memorial Highway)	
Charlotte	0.80	1.29	SR 615 (Lawyers Road)	Hancock Road	Campbell County line	
Chesterfield	0.62	1.00	SR 650 (Turner Road)	Cloverleaf Drive	SR 687 (Starview Lane)	
Clarke	6.95	11.18	Warren County line	Stone Bridge Road Featherbed Road Gun Barrell Road Ginns Road	SR 655 (Ford Road)	Gap between segments ending at different points along SR 658 Gap between segments ending at different points along US 340
Craig	0.70	1.13	Dead End	Cumberland Avenue	SR 42 (Cumberland Gap Road)	
Culpeper	6.56	10.56	SR 633 (Hudson Mill Road/Norman Road)	Reva Road	Rappahannock County line	
Cumberland	1.20	1.93	SR 600 (Stoney Point Road)	Forest Hill Road	SR 631 (Davenport Road)	
Dickenson	6.44	10.36	SR 649 (DC Caney Ridge Road)	Unnamed road	SR 652 (Dr Ralph Stanley Highway)	
Dinwiddie	9.62	15.48	SR 40 (Doyle Boulevard)	Depot Road Brills Road	SR 40 (Old Cryors Road/Darvills Road)	
Essex	1.38	2.22	SR 602 (Ashdale Road)	Wildwood Road	Dead End	
Fairfax	11.82	19.02	SR 286 (Fairfax County Parkway)	Old Keene Mill Road Franconia Road	SR 611 (Telegraph Road)	
Fauquier	3.30	5.31	US 17 (Marsh Road)	Ritchie Road	SR 806 (Elk Run Road)	
Floyd	3.95	6.36	SR 645 (Twin Falls Road)	Pine Forest Road County Line Road	US 221 (Bent Mountain Road)	
Fluvanna	2.90	4.67	US 15 (James Madison Highway)	Salem Church Road Friendship Road Salem Church Road	SR 616 (Union Mills Road)	Gap between segments ending at different points along US 15
Franklin	0.09	0.14	SR 122 (Booker T Washington Highway)	Flint Hill Road	SR 699 (Angle Plantation Road/Flint Hill Road)	
Frederick	4.42	7.11	Dead End	Parkins Mill Road Papermill Road	Winchester city limits	Gap between segments ending at different points along US 522
Giles	1.85	2.98	SR 643 (State Line Road)	Possum Hollow Road	SR 645 (Market Street)	
Gloucester	0.95	1.53	Dead End	Rosewell Plantation Road	SR 632 (Aberdeen Creek Road)	
Goochland	4.58	7.37	Dead End	Sabot Station Road Miller Lane	SR 621 (Manakin Road)	Gap between segments ending at different points along SR 6
Grayson	2.94	4.73	SR 94 (Ivennue Road)	Winding Road Sheep Grove Road Freedom Lane	Dead End	
Greene	1.00	1.61	Dead End	Gilbert Road	SR 607 (Cedar Grove Road)/SR 743 (Advance Mills Road)	
Greensville	0.47	0.76	SR 640 (Ruritan Drive)	Satterfield Drive	Emporia city limits	
Halifax	4.55	7.32	SR 603 (Hunting Creek Road)	Nathalie Road Stoney Ridge Road	SR 626 (Clarkton Road)	
Hanover	2.40	3.86	SR 606 (Studley Road)	Summer Hill Road	SR 605 (River Road)	
Henry	4.81	7.74	Dead End	Hobson Road	SR 620 (Daniel Road)	
Highland	5.50	8.85	SR 640	Unnamed road	West Virginia state line	
Isle of Wight	15.20	24.46	US 460	Zuni Circle Fire Tower Road Redhouse Road Bowling Green Road Turner Drive	US 258/SR 10	Gap between segments ending at different points along US 258 Gap between segments ending at different points along SR 637
James City	0.16	0.26	Dead End	Monument Drive	York County line	
King and Queen	1.40	2.25	SR 601 (Stratton Major Road)	Jonestown Road	SR 14 (Buena Vista Road)	
King George	0.70	1.13	SR 206 (Dahlgren Road)	Potts Lane	Dead End	
King William	0.85	1.37	SR 30 (King William Road)	Olde Footpath Road	SR 30 (King William Road)	
Lancaster	0.52	0.84	SR 643 (Scott Road)	Clark Point Drive	Dead End	
Lee	3.55	5.71	Dead End	Unnamed road	SR 640 (Shavers Ford Road)	Gap between segments ending at different points along US 58 Alt
Loudoun	0.05	0.08	Dead End	Little Spring Road	US 15 (James Monroe Highway)	
Louisa	5.10	8.21	SR 605 (Shannon Hill Road)	Mount Airy Road	US 33 (Jefferson Highway)	
Lunenburg	1.90	3.06	SR 643 (New Grove Road)	Gary Road	SR 635 (Oral Oaks Road)	
Madison	1.50	2.41	SR 643 (Etlan Road)	Emmett Road	SR 646 (Champe Plain Road)	
Mathews	3.50	5.63	SR 614 (Williams Wharf Road)	Bandy Ridge Road Lillys Neck Road	Dead End	Gap between segments ending at different points along SR 611 Gap between segments ending at different points along SR 643
Mecklenburg	1.40	2.25	SR 1010 (Golden Eagle Drive)	Watkins Road	Dead End	
Middlesex	1.00	1.61	Dead End	Sibleys Landing Road	SR 629 (Stormont Road)	
Montgomery	0.95	1.53	SR 723 (Ellett Road)	Woodrow Road Ridgeway Road Pollard Road	SR 1430 (Pollard Road)	
Nelson	1.40	2.25	Dead End	River Birch Lane	SR 626 (James River Road)	
New Kent	1.30	2.09	Dead End	Newtown Road	SR 619 (Hopewell Road)	
Northampton	2.68	4.31	Cul-de-Sac	Custom Tomb Drive Arlington Road	US 13 (Lankford Highway)	
Northumberland	11.15	17.94	Dead End	Main Street Reed Avenue Blackberry Road Sunny Bank Road Ferry Road Hacks Neck Road	US 360 (Northumberland Highway)	Gap between segments ending at different points along SR 649
Nottoway	4.90	7.89	SR 46 (Brunswick Road)	Ridge Road	Blackstone town limits	
Orange	6.21	9.99	Albemarle County line	Burnley Road Ridge Road	SR 609 (Scuffletown Road)	
Page	2.40	3.86	Dead End	Big Oak Road	US 211 (Lee Highway)	
Patrick	5.87	9.45	SR 661 (Creasy Chapel Road/Dangler Mountain Road)	Creasy Chapel Road	SR 631 (Dobyns Road)	Gap between segments ending at different points along SR 103
Pittsylvania	6.70	10.78	SR 626 (Museville Road)	Cooksburg Road	SR 799 (Climax Road)	Gap between segments ending at different points along SR 750
Powhatan	0.35	0.56	SR 13 (Old Buckingham Road)	Old Plantation Road	Dead End	
Prince Edward	0.90	1.45	SR 643 (High Street)	Buffalo Heights Road	Dead End	
Prince George	0.80	1.29	SR 10/SR 156	James Crest Drive	Dead End	
Prince William	0.16	0.26	SR 772 (Marsteller Drive)	Free Street	SR 718 (Nokes Street)	
Pulaski	2.91	4.68	SR 611 (Newbern Road)	Miller Lane Hurston Road Old Mill Road	Dead End	Gap between segments ending at different points along FR-47
Rappahannock	0.30	0.48	Culpeper County line	Reva Road	SR 707 (Slate Mills Road)	
Richmond	0.46	0.74	Dead End	Selfs Lane	SR 656 (Bryants Town Road)	
Roanoke	0.60	0.97	Floyd County Line	County Line Road	SR 669 (Patterson Drive)	
Rockbridge	7.70	12.39	SR 612 (Blue Grass Trail)	Unnamed road	SR 641	Gap between segments ending at different points along SR 251 Gap between segments ending at different points along SR 672 Gap between dead ends
Rockingham	6.59	10.61	SR 641 (Waterloo Mill Lane)	Mount Olivet Church Road Resort Drive	SR 602/SR 646	
Russell	1.05	1.69	SR 603 (Mountain Road)	Settle Lane	US 19	
Scott	3.85	6.20	Dead End	Unnamed road	SR 627	
Shenandoah	2.10	3.38	US 11 (Old Valley Pike)	Millner Road	SR 648 (Sandy Hook Road)	
Smyth	4.40	7.08	SR 638	Unnamed road	SR 645 (Fox Valley Road)	
Southampton	1.45	2.33	SR 649 (Country Club Road)	Scottswood Drive	SR 643 (Bethel Road)	
Spotsylvania	0.16	0.26	US 1 Bus (Lafayette Boulevard)	Village Drive Marshall Drive	Dead End	
Stafford	2.74	4.41	SR 627 (Mountain View Road)	Rock Hill Church Road	SR 610 (Garrisonville Road)	
Surry	0.90	1.45	SR 31 (Rolfe Highway)	Moorings Road	SR 622 (Runnymeade Road)	
Sussex	6.26	10.07	SR 645 (Owen Road)	Faison Road Unnamed road	SR 631 (Gray Road)	Gap between segments ending at different points along SR 635
Tazewell	15.33	24.67	SR 16 (Stoney Ridge Road)	Horsepen Road Abbs Valley Road Boissevain Road Exhibition Mine Road Water Street Bramwell Road	West Virginia state line/SR 663	Gap between end of state maintenance and SR 102
Warren	0.40	0.64	Clarke County line	Stonebridge Road	SR 624 (Milldale Road)	
Washington	0.50	0.80	Dead End	Redwood Circle	SR 640 (Benhams Road)	
Westmoreland	2.20	3.54	SR 622 (Panorama Road)	Wild Sally Road	SR 214 (Stratford Hall Road)	
Wise	5.80	9.33	SR 646 (Coeburn Mountain Road)	Pole Bridge Road Unnamed road	Dead End	Gap between segments ending at different points along SR 640
Wythe	3.60	5.79	SR 642 (Pope Road)	Powder Mill Road	SR 601 (Rakes Town Road)	
York	0.13	0.21	SR 655 (Allens Mill Road)	Old Dare Road	Dead End	
