= Virginia State Route 630 =

Discontinuous road segments in Virginia's counties

State Route 630

Route information
- Maintained by VDOT

Location
- Country: United States
- State: Virginia

Highway system
- Virginia Routes; Interstate; US; Primary; Secondary; Byways; History; HOT lanes

State Route 630 (SR 630) in the U.S. state of Virginia is a secondary route designation applied to multiple discontinuous road segments among the many counties. The list below describes the sections in each county that are designated SR 630.

== List ==
County	Length (mi)	Length (km)	From	Via	To	Notes
Accomack	3.10	4.99	Dead End	Burton Road Martin Road	Dead End	Gap between SR 180 and SR 631
Albemarle	6.30	10.14	Nelson County Line	Green Creek Road	SR 717 (Secretarys Sand Road)	
Alleghany	1.50	2.41	SR 42 (Forty Two Road)	Griffith Road	Dead End	
Amelia	5.57	8.96	US 360 (Patrick Henry Highway)	Winterham Road Egglestetton Road	SR 681 (Pridesville Road)	
Amherst	2.06	3.32	Dead End	Crawleys Creek Road Dillard Hill Road	SR 666 (Woodson Road)	
Appomattox	7.85	12.63	Charlotte County Line	Old Evergreen Road	US 460 (Richmond Highway)	
Augusta	0.70	1.13	Dead End	Caldwell Lane	SR 640 (Goose Creek Road)	
Bath	1.35	2.17	SR 39 (Mountain Valley Road)	Stage Coach Drive	SR 39	
Bedford	7.56	12.17	SR 626 (Smith Mountain Lake Parkway)	Carters Mill Road Chellis Ford Road	Campbell County Line	
Bland	0.19	0.31	Dead End	Creekside Drive	SR 665 (Quarry Drive)	
Botetourt	16.82	27.07	SR 779 (Catawba Road)	Blacksburg Road Main Street Hancock Street Springwood Road	SR 43 (Narrow Passage Road)	
Brunswick	11.76	18.93	SR 712 (Old Stage Road)	Sturgeon Road Waqua Creek Road	SR 629 (Rawlings Road)	
Buchanan	0.50	0.80	Dead End	Drill	Russell County Line	
Buckingham	2.20	3.54	US 15 (James Madison Highway)	Red Road	US 60 (James Madison Highway)	
Campbell	2.10	3.38	Bedford County Line	Chellis Ford Road	SR 43 (Bedford Highway)	
Caroline	9.79	15.76	SR 721 (Newton Road)	Sparta Road	SR 635/Essex County Line	
Carroll	2.83	4.55	SR 654 (Laurel Fork Road)	Fishermans Lane Butterfly Road Hylton Road	SR 781 (Mat Road)	Gap between dead ends Gap between segments ending at different points along SR 638
Charles City	1.59	2.56	SR 602 (Lott Cary Road)	Samaria Road	SR 631 (Cool Hill Road)	
Charlotte	1.78	2.86	US 15 (Kings Highway)	Fort Mitchell Road	Lunenburg County Line	
Chesterfield	3.40	5.47	SR 602 (River Rd)	Graves Road	SR 628 (Hickory Road)	
Clarke	0.20	0.32	Dead End	Iron Rail Road	US 50 (Millwood Pike)	
Craig	3.21	5.17	SR 42	Unnamed road	SR 629	
Culpeper	4.10	6.60	SR 229 (Rixeyville Road)	Jamesons Mill Road	Dead End	
Cumberland	0.10	0.16	SR 9111 (School Road)	School Road	US 60 (Anderson Highway)	
Dickenson	3.40	5.47	Wise County Line	Unnamed road	SR 631 (Brush Creek Road)	
Dinwiddie	0.30	0.48	Sussex County Line	Winfield Road	SR 40 (McKenney Highway)	
Essex	4.29	6.90	SR 635 (Battery Road)	Bull Neck Road	SR 624 (Essex Church Road)	
Fairfax	1.69	2.72	SR 629 (Fort Hunt Road)	Quander Road	US 1 (Richmond Highway)	
Fauquier	0.47	0.76	Dead End	Fletchers Mill Road	SR 691 (Carters Run Road)	
Floyd	5.90	9.50	SR 758 (Buffalo Mountain Road)	Burkes Fork Road Dogwood Lane	SR 799 (Conner Grove Road)	
Fluvanna	6.80	10.94	SR 659 (Cedar Lane)	Plain Dealing Road Mountain Laurel Road Hollands Road	SR 613 (Bybees Church Road)	Gap between segments ending at different points along SR 629
Franklin	3.67	5.91	SR 619 (Fanny Cook Road)	Airport Road	SR 890 (Snow Creek Road)	
Frederick	0.90	1.45	SR 654 (Marple Road/Poorhouse Road)	Bethel Grange Road	SR 608 (Old Bethel Church Road)	
Giles	0.34	0.55	Dead End	Hoot Owl Road	SR 635 (Big Stoney Creek Road)	
Gloucester	1.00	1.61	SR 629 (Paige Road)	Paynes Landing Road	Dead End	
Goochland	0.70	1.13	Dead End	Cedar Point Road	SR 6 (River Road)	
Grayson	0.16	0.26	SR 824 (Frazier Road)	Elmtree Lane	Dead End	
Greene	2.32	3.73	SR 810 (Dyke Road)	Rosebrook Drive	SR 626 (Snow Mountain Road)	
Greensville	2.53	4.07	SR 139 (Jarratt Avenue)	Allen Street River Road	Sussex County Line	
Halifax	1.40	2.25	SR 630 (Lenning Road)	Doctor Merritt Road	Dead End	
Hanover	2.49	4.01	SR 156 (Cold Harbor Road)	Market Road	SR 619 (Rockhill Road)	
Henry	4.00	6.44	US 58 (A L Philpott Highway)	Maple Leaf Road Log Manor Road Old Well Road	Dead End	
Highland	0.52	0.84	Dead End	Unnamed road	SR 629	
Isle of Wight	6.15	9.90	US 58 Bus (Carrsville Highway)	Beaverdam Road Hunt Club Road Lawrence Drive	US 258 (Walters Highway)	Gap between segments ending at different points along US 258 Gap between segments ending at different points along SR 611
James City	0.40	0.64	SR 636 (Peach Street)	Peach Street	SR 761	
King and Queen	2.50	4.02	SR 631 (Poor House Lane)	Deshazo Road	SR 612 (Lily Pond Road)	
King George	0.25	0.40	Dead End	Kitchen Point Road	SR 616 (Brickhouse Road)	
King William	3.72	5.99	Dead End	Smith Ferry Road Churchville Road	SR 30 (King William Road)	Gap between segments ending at different points along SR 632
Lancaster	2.35	3.78	Dead End	Taylors Creek Road	SR 222/SR 646	
Lee	4.88	7.85	US 421	Big Hill Road	US 58 Alt	
Loudoun	8.10	13.04	SR 743 (Welbourne Road)	Quaker Lane Unison Road Jeb Stuart Road	SR 734 (Snickersville Turnpike)	
Louisa	1.70	2.74	Dead End	Harris Creek Road	SR 208 (Courthouse Road)	
Lunenburg	5.65	9.09	Charlotte County Line	Mitchell Drive Fort Mitchell Drive	SR 49 (Courthouse Road)	
Madison	4.49	7.23	SR 631 (Leon Road)	Thoroughfare Road	SR 678 (Tibbs Shop Road)	
Mathews	1.50	2.41	SR 198	Roane Point Drive	Dead End	
Mecklenburg	10.40	16.74	US 1	Smith Cross Road Belfield Road	SR 618 (Marengo Road)	
Middlesex	1.70	2.74	Dead End	Stampers Bay Road	SR 33 (General Puller Highway)	
Montgomery	1.60	2.57	SR 785 (Catawba Road)	Gallion Ridge Road	SR 624 (Mount Tabor Road)	
Nelson	1.05	1.69	SR 617 (Rockfish River Road)	Green Creek Road	Albemarle County Line	
New Kent	1.00	1.61	SR 610 (Pine Fork Drive)	George W Watkins Drive	SR 249 (New Kent Highway)	
Northampton	4.03	6.49	Dead End	Old Town Neck Road Cherrydale Drive	SR 600 (Seaside Road)	Gap between US 13 Bus and US 13
Northumberland	5.30	8.53	US 360 (Northumberland Highway)	Walnut Point Road	Dead End	
Nottoway	5.72	9.21	US 360 (Patrick Henry Highway)	Melody Lane Maryland Avenue Bible Way Road Bible Way Drive Mountain Hall Road	SR 615 (Namozine Road)	Gap between segments ending at different points along SR 49
Orange	2.40	3.86	SR 669 (Marquis Road)	Matthews Mill Road	SR 629 (Lahore Road)	
Page	0.56	0.90	SR 629	Creekview Loop	SR 629	
Patrick	1.99	3.20	SR 663 (Elastic Plant Road)	Brushy Mountain Road	SR 662 (Collinstown Road)	
Pittsylvania	4.60	7.40	SR 40 (Gretna Road)	Hodnetts Road Watlington Road	SR 900 (Glenland Road)	Gap between segments ending at different points along SR 670
Powhatan	7.84	12.62	SR 13 (Old Buckingham Road)	Ballsville Road	SR 629 (Trenholm Road)	
Prince Edward	18.44	29.68	SR 662 (Levi Road)	Free State Road Stagecoach Road Meherrin Road Redd Shop Road Worsham Road Old Ridge Road Bush River Road	Dead End	Gap between segments ending at different points along US 15
Prince George	12.69	20.42	SR 625 (Hines Road/Arwood Road)	Golf Course Road Golf Course Drive Lamore Drive Lamore Road Rives Road Bull Hill Road Jefferson Park Road	SR 36/Hopewell City Limits	Gap between segments ending at different points along SR 156 Gap between segments ending at different points along SR 629
Prince William	1.47	2.37	SR 601 (Waterfall Road)	Mill Creek Road	Dead End	
Pulaski	0.35	0.56	US 11 (Lee Highway)	Round House Street	SR 114 (Peppers Ferry Boulevard)	
Rappahannock	3.00	4.83	Dead End	Riley Hollow Road Hittles Mill Road	US 522 (Zachary Taylor Avenue)	
Richmond	4.35	7.00	Dead End	Wellfords Wharf Road	SR 3 (Historyland Highway)	
Roanoke	0.55	0.89	Salem City Limits	Kessler Mill Road	SR 311 (Thompson Memorial Drive)	
Rockbridge	0.19	0.31	Dead End	Grandview Drive	US 11 (Lee Highway)	
Rockingham	1.50	2.41	SR 754 (Berrytown Road)	Little Gap Road	SR 754 (South Branch Road)	
Russell	0.50	0.80	Buchanan County Line	Cartwright Road	SR 624 (Drill Road)	
Scott	2.72	4.38	SR 625	Unnamed road	SR 600 (Fairview Road)	
Shenandoah	1.25	2.01	SR 629 (Oranda Road)	Orndorff Road Beeler Drive	SR 631 (Pine Grove Road)	Gap between segments ending at different points along SR 622
Smyth	3.57	5.75	SR 610 (Valley Road)	Long Hollow Road Unnamed road	Dead End	Gap between segments ending at different points along SR 42
Southampton	1.30	2.09	SR 631 (Corinth Road)	Camp Farm Road	SR 626 (Womble Mill Road)	
Spotsylvania	0.38	0.61	SR 655 (Ridge Road)	Corene Road	SR 208 (Courthouse Road)	
Stafford	9.03	14.53	SR 648 (Shelton Shop Road)	Courthouse Road	Dead End	
Surry	6.04	9.72	SR 31 (Rolfe Highway)	Spatley Road Mill Road	SR 618 (Southwick Road)	Gap between segments ending at different points along SR 616
Sussex	6.79	10.93	Greensville County Line	Little Mill Road	Dinwiddie County Line	
Tazewell	2.60	4.18	SR 626 (Ravens Nest Branch Road)	Laurel Road Buck Hollow	SR 626 (Ravens Nest Branch Road)	
Warren	2.25	3.62	Dead End	Thompson Hollow Road	SR 613 (Bentonville Browntown Road)	
Washington	7.01	11.28	Tennessee State Line	Johnson Chapel Road Archery Range Road Marys Chapel Road Cove Creek Road McCall Gap Road	SR 616 (Willow Branch Road)	Gap between segments ending at different points along SR 633
Westmoreland	1.90	3.06	SR 628 (Pomona Road)	Treakle Lane	SR 631 (Longfield Road)	
Wise	6.95	11.18	Pound Town Limits	Old North Fork Road South Mountain Road Unnamed road	Dickenson County Line	Gap between segments ending at different points along US 23
Wythe	2.24	3.60	SR 631 (Walton Furnace Road)	Sanders Mines Road	Dead End	
York	2.51	4.04	SR 621 (Grafton Drive)	Amory Lane Wolf Trap Road	SR 718 (Hornsbyville Road)	
