= Virginia State Route 628 =

State highway in Virginia, United States

State Route 628

Route information
- Maintained by VDOT

Location
- Country: United States
- State: Virginia

Highway system
- Virginia Routes; Interstate; US; Primary; Secondary; Byways; History; HOT lanes

State Route 628 (SR 628) in the U.S. state of Virginia is a secondary route designation applied to multiple discontinuous road segments among the many counties. The list below describes the sections in each county that are designated SR 628.

== List ==
County	Length (mi)	Length (km)	From	Via	To	Notes
Accomack	1.65	2.66	Dead End	Country Club Road	SR 178 (Bobtown Road)	
Albemarle	0.80	1.29	Greene County Line	Simmons Gap Road	SR 810 (Simmons Gap Road/Boonesville Road)	
Alleghany	0.33	0.53	Dead End	Jackson Drive	SR 698 (Chapel Drive)	
Amelia	3.50	5.63	SR 153 (Military Road)	Butlers Road	US 360 (Patrick Henry Highway)	
Amherst	0.95	1.53	Dead End	Stroude Mountain Road	SR 663 (Brightwells Mill Road)	
Appomattox	4.42	7.11	Charlotte County Line	Piney Ridge Road Wood Row Road	SR 601 (Forest Chapel Road)	
Augusta	3.62	5.83	SR 612 (Crimora Mine Road)	Thorofare Road McGuslin Lane Leonard Road	Dead End	Gap between US 340 and a dead end
Bath	0.80	1.29	Dead End	Junction Road	SR 614 (Muddy Run Road)	
Bedford	7.49	12.05	Campbell County Line	Bishop Creek Road Mentow Road Willards Way	SR 24 (Glenwood Drive)	
Bland	0.08	0.13	US 52 (North Scenic Highway)	Eagles Road	SR 652 (Fernwood Drive)	
Botetourt	2.37	3.81	SR 635 (Beaver Dam Road)	Prease Road	SR 772 (Long Run Road)	
Brunswick	12.80	20.60	SR 616 (Lew Jones Road)	Judd Road Clifton Road Red Oak Road Little Mount Road Red Oak Road Church Street	SR 136/SR 1403 (2nd Avenue)	Gap between segments ending at different points along SR 616 Gap between segments ending at different points along SR 636 Gap between segments ending at different points along SR 643
Buchanan	10.51	16.91	SR 629	Horn Mountain Road	SR 639 (Compton Mountain Road)	Gap between segments ending at different points along SR 638
Buckingham	5.51	8.87	SR 632 (Ca Ira Road)	Payne Creek Road High Rock Road	SR 650 (Belle Road)	
Campbell	4.14	6.66	Bedford County Line	Bishop Creek Road	SR 43 (Bedford Highway)	
Caroline	2.18	3.51	SR 722 (Colonial Road)	Antioch Road	US 301/SR 2 (Richmond Turnpike)	
Carroll	5.90	9.50	SR 662 (Poplar Hill Drive)	Burkes Fork Road	SR 626/Floyd County Line	Gap between segments ending at different points along SR 638
Charles City	0.04	0.06	Dead End	Courthouse Green	SR 644 (Courthouse Road)	
Charlotte	0.50	0.80	SR 40 (Lunenburg Highway)	Puryear Road	Lunenburg County Line	
Chesterfield	9.25	14.89	SR 636 (Exter Mill Road)	Trents Bridge Road Hickory Road	SR 36 (River Road)	Gap between segments ending at different points along SR 602
Clarke	2.84	4.57	US 340 (Lord Fairfax Highway)	Berry Ferry Road	SR 626 (Nelson Road)	
Craig	1.61	2.59	SR 629 (Northside Road)	Simmonsville Road Unnamed road	SR 42	
Culpeper	8.11	13.05	Dead End	Curling Creek Lane Weslyn Drive Hazel River Road Butler Store Road	SR 611 (Waterford Road)	Gap between segments ending at different points along SR 646 Gap between segments ending at different points along SR 729 Gap between segments ending at different points along SR 640
Cumberland	3.86	6.21	US 60 (Anderson Highway)	Forest View Road	SR 629 Oak Hill Road	
Dickenson	0.65	1.05	Wise County Line	Unnamed road	SR 627	
Dinwiddie	5.09	8.19	Dead End	Tranquility Lane	SR 751 (Cox Road)	
Essex	1.70	2.74	SR 627 (Mount Landing Road)	Fernlea Road	SR 629 (Essex Church Road)	
Fairfax	1.90	3.06	SR 626 (Sherwood Hall Road)	Parker Lane Collingwood Road	Mount Vernon Memorial Highway	
Fauquier	20.93	33.68	SR 691 (Wilson Road)	Cannonball Gate Road Keith Road Blantyre Road Trapp Branch Road Bust Head Road Landmark Road Logans Mill Road	Loudoun County Line	Gap between segments ending at different points along US 17 Gap between segments ending at different points along SR 601
Floyd	1.00	1.61	Carroll County Line	Rock Church Road	SR 758 (Buffalo Mountain Road)	
Fluvanna	0.70	1.13	Dead End	Evergreen Church Road	SR 608 (Rising Sun Road)	
Franklin	1.28	2.06	SR 646 (Doe Run Road)	Country Mile Road	SR 969 (Danville Turnpike)	
Frederick	8.92	14.36	Shenandoah County Line	Middle Road	Winchester City Limits	
Giles	0.80	1.29	SR 635 (Big Stony Creek Road)	Olean Road	Dead End	
Gloucester	3.29	5.29	US 17 (George Washington Memorial Highway)	T C Walker Road Crockett Lane	SR 626 (Zanoni Road)	Gap between segments ending at different points along SR 629
Goochland	2.40	3.86	Dead End	Lee Road	SR 6 (River Road)	
Grayson	2.40	3.86	North Carolina State Line	Crab Orchard Road Unnamed road	Dead End	Gap between segments ending at different points along SR 629
Greene	5.00	8.05	Shenandoah National Park boundary	Simmons Gap Road	Albemarle County Line	
Greensville	4.80	7.72	Dead End	Rolling Acres Road Miles Town Road	SR 629 (Zion Church Road)	
Halifax	4.90	7.89	SR 647 (Leda Grove Road)	Chestnut Road	US 501 (L P Bailey Memorial Highway)	
Hanover	10.25	16.50	SR 613 (Fox Hunter Lane)	McClellan Road Spring Run Road	SR 606 (Studley Road)	Gap between segments ending at different points along SR 606
Henry	4.55	7.32	SR 57 (Chatham Road)	Blue Knob Road Sours Mill Road	Dead End	Gap between segments ending at different points along SR 619
Highland	0.80	1.29	Dead End	Unnamed road	SR 624	
Isle of Wight	0.40	0.64	SR 676 (Fort Huger Drive)	Burnt Mill Road	Surry County Line	
King and Queen	9.60	15.45	US 360 (Richmond Highway)	Green Chambers Road Pattie Swamp Road Todds Bridge Road Spring Cottage Road	King William County Line	Gap between segments ending at different points along SR 721 Gap between dead ends
King George	2.51	4.04	SR 3 (Kings Highway)	Stoney Knoll Road	Westmoreland County Line	
King William	7.24	11.65	SR 604 (Herring Creek Road)	Dorrell Road	King and Queen County Line	
Lancaster	0.37	0.60	Dead End	Beach Creek Road	SR 627 (Chownings Ferry Road)	
Lee	2.55	4.10	Dead End	Reeds Creek Road	SR 606	
Loudoun	0.45	0.72	Fauquier County Line	Fred Warren Lane	Dead End	
Louisa	7.38	11.88	US 33/SR 1004	Fredericksburg Avenue Bibb Store Road Winston Road	Dead End	Gap between segments ending at different points along SR 613
Lunenburg	4.31	6.94	Charlotte County Line	County Line Road	SR 685 (Germantown Road)	
Madison	0.80	1.29	SR 607 (Elly Road)	Spikes Drive Berryhill Lane	SR 634 (Oak Park Road)	Gap between dead ends
Mathews	1.67	2.69	SR 198	Unnamed road Cobbs Creek Lane	Dead End	
Mecklenburg	1.70	2.74	SR 618 (Marengo Road)	Webb Road	SR 630 (Belfield Road)	
Middlesex	2.30	3.70	SR 33 (General Puller Highway)	Mill Creek Road	Dead End	
Montgomery	2.90	4.67	SR 785 (Catawba Road)	Dry Run Road	SR 624 (Mount Tabor Road)	
Nelson	2.40	3.86	Dead End	Rhue Hollow Road Gullysville Lane	SR 151 (Patrick Henry Highway)	
New Kent	6.78	10.91	US 60 (Pocahontas Trail)	Mount Pleasant Road	FR-119/SR 627	
Northampton	4.30	6.92	Dead End	Wilsonia Neck Drive James Allen Drive	SR 600 (Seaside Road)	Gap between segments ending at different points along US 13
Northumberland	0.96	1.54	SR 629 (Bundick Road)	Coan Haven Road	Dead End	
Nottoway	7.10	11.43	Dead End	Agnew Street Dutchtown Road	SR 307 (Holly Farm Road)	
Orange	3.70	5.95	SR 20 (Constitution Highway)	Clifton Road	SR 627 (Clarks Mountain Road)	
Page	2.20	3.54	SR 611 (Kite Hollow Road)	Balkamore Hill Road	SR 689 (Ida Road)	
Patrick	6.23	10.03	SR 697 (Via Orchard Road)	Dick and Willie Road South County Road	SR 627 (Wingfield Orchard Drive)	Gap between segments ending at different points along SR 701
Pittsylvania	5.10	8.21	SR 640 (Renan Road)	Harmony Road	SR 668 (Level Run Road)	
Powhatan	5.69	9.16	US 60 (James Anderson Highway)	Lower Hill Road Red Lane Road Lees Landing Road	SR 711 (Huguenot Trail Road)	Gap between segments ending at different points along US 60 Gap between segments ending at different points along SR 615
Prince Edward	18.15	29.21	SR 624 (Barton Road/Old Peach Tree Road)	Old Peach Tree Road Campbell Crossing Road Mill Creek Road Mountain Creek Road Leigh Mountain Road Zion Hill Road Commerce Road Germantown Road	Farmville Town Limits	Gap between segments ending at different points along SR 662 Gap between segments ending at different points along SR 632 Gap between segments ending at different points along SR 630
Prince George	2.16	3.48	SR 608 (Garys Church Road)	Griffin Road	SR 629 (Birdsong Road)	
Prince William	0.48	0.77	SR 619 (Joplin Road)	Johnson Road	Dead End	
Pulaski	2.20	3.54	SR 100 (Clebone Road)	Kent Farm Road	Dead End	
Rappahannock	6.85	11.02	Dead End	Main Street Fodderstack Road Dearing Road	SR 630 (Hittles Mill Road/Riley Hollow Road)	
Richmond	0.70	1.13	Dead End	Cole Hill Lane	US 360 (Richmond Road)	
Roanoke	3.35	5.39	SR 780 (Cove Road)	Green Ridge Road Woodhaven Road	SR 117 (Peters Creek Road)	
Rockbridge	0.80	1.29	SR 627 (Sycamore Valley Drive)	Mohlers Loop	Dead End	
Rockingham	5.30	8.53	Shenandoah National Park boundary	Beldor Road	US 33 (Spotswood Trail)	
Russell	6.99	11.25	Wise County Line	Boody Road Heralds Valley Road	SR 665 (Power Plant Road)	Gap between segments ending at different points along SR 615
Scott	0.80	1.29	SR 629	Unnamed road	SR 627	
Shenandoah	4.55	7.32	SR 55 (John Marshall Highway)	Unnamed road Middle Road	Frederick County Line	Gap between segments ending at different points along SR 55
Smyth	0.90	1.45	SR 42 (Bluegrass Trail)	Cussing Hollow Road	Dead End	
Southampton	11.55	18.59	SR 35 (Plank Road/Main Street)	Wakefield Road Courtland Road	Sussex County Line	
Spotsylvania	6.28	10.11	US 1 (Jefferson Davis Highway)	Spotsylvania Parkway Smith Station Road	SR 627 (Gordon Road)	
Stafford	9.75	15.69	SR 648 (Shelton Shop Road)	Winding Creek Road Ramoth Church Road Eskimo Hill Road	SR 608 (Brooke Road)	
Surry	1.90	3.06	Isle of Wight County Line	Burnt Mill Road	SR 617 (Bacons Castle Terrace)	
Sussex	5.62	9.04	Southampton County Line	Courtland Road Main Street	US 460	
Tazewell	2.00	3.22	SR 627 (Bandy Road)	Fire Tower Road	Dead End	
Warren	2.20	3.54	US 340 (Stonewall Jackson Highway)	Rocky Hollow Road	SR 613 (Indian Hollow Road)	
Washington	4.00	6.44	SR 627 (Wolf Run Road)	Lone Star Road	SR 616 (Walnut Grove Road/Little Wolf Run Road)	
Westmoreland	6.32	10.17	King George County Line	Pomona Road Stoney Knoll	SR 205	
Wise	5.52	8.88	Russell County Line	Honey Branch Road Unnamed road	Dickenson County Line	Gap between segments ending at different points along SR 63
Wythe	0.49	0.79	Dead End	Jones Road	SR 629 (Red Hollow Road)	
York	0.30	0.48	Dead End	Lewis Drive	SR 622 (Seaford Road)	
