= Virginia State Route 612 =

State highway in Virginia, United States

State Route 612

Route information
- Maintained by VDOT

Location
- Country: United States
- State: Virginia

Highway system
- Virginia Routes; Interstate; US; Primary; Secondary; Byways; History; HOT lanes

State Route 612 (SR 612) in the U.S. state of Virginia is a secondary route designation applied to multiple discontinuous road segments among the many counties. The list below describes the sections in each county that are designated SR 612.

== List ==
County	Length (mi)	Length (km)	From	Via	To	Notes
Accomack	3.15	5.07	Dead End	Scarbouroughs Neck Road	SR 615 (Cradockville Road)	
Albemarle	1.70	2.74	SR 20 (Stony Point Road)	Hammocks Gap Road	Dead End	
Alleghany	1.56	2.51	SR 616	Uplands Road	SR 18 (Potts Creek Road)	
Amelia	9.62	15.48	Nottoway County Line	Richmond Road	SR 602 (Bevils Bridge Road)	Gap between segments ending at different points along SR 708
Amherst	1.66	2.67	SR 151 (Patrick Henry Highway)	Meredith Lane Summer Hill Road	Dead End	Gap between segments ending at different points along SR 611
Appomattox	0.95	1.53	SR 601 (Planters Town Road/Cutbanks Road)	Cutbanks Road	Buckingham County Line	
Augusta	22.61	36.39	SR 254 (Parkersburg Turnpike)	Frog Pond Road Galena Road Pleasant View Road Quicks Mill Road Laurel Hill Road Crimora Road Crimora Mine Road	Dead End	Gap between segments ending at different points along US 250 Gap between segments ending at different points along SR 742 Gap between segments ending at different points along SR 613
Bath	0.93	1.50	US 220 (Ingalls Boulevard)	Ashwood Drive	Dead End	
Bedford	1.45	2.33	Dead End	Gruggett Hollow Road	US 501 (Lee Jackson Highway)	
Bland	11.68	18.80	US 52 (North Scenic Highway)	Kimberling Road	SR 606 (Wilderness Road)	
Botetourt	7.50	12.07	Dead End	Shiloh Drive Blue Grass Trail	Rockbridge County Line	
Brunswick	2.00	3.22	SR 629 (Rawlings Road)	Harpers Bridge Road	Dinwiddie County Line	
Buchanan	0.70	1.13	SR 619 (Lee Master Drive)	Looneys Fork	Dead End	
Buckingham	4.79	7.71	Appomattox County Line	Chestnut Grove Road Gilliam Mill Road	SR 640 (Andersonville Road)	Gap between segments ending at different points along SR 636
Campbell	1.90	3.06	SR 633 (Epsons Road)	Ebenezer Road	SR 917 (Railview Road)	
Caroline	0.37	0.60	US 301/SR 628	Gravatt Road	SR 703 (Cannery Road)	
Carroll	2.90	4.67	Grayson County Line	Foothills Road Coleman Ridge Road	SR 608 (Coal Creek Road)	
Charles City	2.77	4.46	Dead End	Ruthville Road	SR 155 (Courthouse Road)	
Charlotte	8.49	13.66	SR 746 (Scuffletown Road)	Herman Road Sunnyside Road	SR 47 (Graftons Gate Highway)	Gap between segments ending at different points along SR 637
Chesterfield	0.25	0.40	US 360 (Hull Street Road)	Gregory Pond Road	Dead End	
Clarke	5.91	9.51	Dead End	Unnamed road Shepherds Mill Road	US 340 (Lord Fairfax Highway)	Gap between segments ending at different points along SR 7
Craig	2.60	4.18	SR 606 (Caldwell Mountain Road)	Pike Lane Angus Lane Scenic View Lane	SR 615	
Culpeper	0.28	0.45	SR 1036 (Shadow Drive)	Wayland Road	Culpeper Town Line	
Cumberland	3.50	5.63	SR 608 (Sports Lake Road)	Trices Lake Road Flanagan Mill Road	SR 690 (Columbia Road)	
Dickenson	0.50	0.80	Dead End	Unnamed road	SR 611 (Bartlick Road)	
Dinwiddie	0.87	1.40	Brunswick County Line	Harpers Bridge Road Old Beaver Pond Road	SR 40 (Old Cryors Road)	
Essex	5.28	8.50	King and Queen County Line	Bestland Road Essex Mill Road Brizendine Lane	Dead End	
Fairfax	8.57	13.79	Prince William County Line	Old Yates Ford Road Henderson Road Yates Ford Road Colchester Road	SR 620 (Braddock Road)	Gap between segments ending at different points along SR 645 Gap between segments ending at different points along SR 641 Gap between segments ending at different points along SR 660
Fauquier	6.05	9.74	Stafford County Line	Tacketts Mill Road Brent Town Road	SR 611 (Sowego Road)	Gap between segments ending at different points along SR 610
Floyd	8.40	13.52	US 221 (Floyd Highway)	Stonewall Road Daniels Run	Montgomery County Line	Gap between segments ending at different points along SR 660
Fluvanna	1.29	2.08	US 15 (James Madison Highway)	Winnsville Drive	SR 6 (West River Road)	
Franklin	1.05	1.69	Roanoke County Line	Slings Gap Road	Roanoke County Line	
Frederick	3.58	5.76	Dead End	Mount Williams Lane Fishel Road Back Ridge Road	SR 600 (Back Mountain Road)	Gap between segments ending at different points along SR 608
Giles	0.38	0.61	SR 730 (Eggleston Road)	Sinking Creek Road Ingles Trail	SR 772 (Sinking Creek Road)	
Gloucester	3.40	5.47	SR 613 (Enos Road)	Marfield Road Millers Landing Road	Dead End	Gap between segments ending at different points along SR 610
Goochland	3.50	5.63	SR 621 (Manakin Road)	Three Chopt Road	SR 654 (Shallow Well Road)	Gap between segments ending at different points along US 250
Grayson	1.20	1.93	Blue Ridge Parkway	Foothills Road	Carroll County Line	
Greene	1.44	2.32	SR 810 (Dyke Road)	March Road	SR 603 (Bingham Mountain Road)	
Greensville	2.40	3.86	SR 619 (Purdy Road)	Unnamed road	SR 651 (Nottoway Road)	
Halifax	1.90	3.06	SR 610 (Clays Mill Road)	Clays Mill School Road	Dead End	
Henry	1.90	3.06	Pittsylvania County Line	Hairfield Lane	SR 647 (Mountain Valley Road)	
Highland	5.20	8.37	SR 678 (Bullpasture River Road)	Unnamed road	SR 614	
Isle of Wight	5.50	8.85	Suffolk City Limits	Outland Drive Spivey Town Road	SR 609 (Knoxville Road)	Gap between segments ending at different points along SR 632
James City	3.83	6.16	SR 614 (Centerville Road)	Longhill Road	Williamsburg City Limits	
King and Queen	4.60	7.40	SR 14 (The Trail)	Lily Pond Road	Essex County Line	
King George	0.20	0.32	SR 610 (Indiantown Road)	Locust Dale Lane	Dead End	
King William	0.75	1.21	SR 30 (King William Road)	Kelley Road	SR 30 (King William Road)	
Lancaster	1.80	2.90	Dead End	Buzzards Neck Road	SR 604 (Merry Point Road)	
Lee	27.16	43.71	SR 758/Tennessee State Line	Lower Waldens Creek Road Middle Waldens Creek Road Middle Wallens Creek Road Kane Gap Road	SR 611 (Jasper Road)	Gap between segments ending at different points along SR 70 Gap between segments ending at different points along US 58
Loudoun	3.21	5.17	US 50 (John S Mosby Highway)	Tall Race Road	US 15 (Monroe Highway)	
Louisa	2.70	4.35	US 33 (Jefferson Highway)	Halls Store Road	SR 609 (Buckner Road)	
Lunenburg	5.00	8.05	SR 138 (Hill Road)	Saint Johns Church Road	SR 613 (Brickland Road)	
Madison	1.92	3.09	US 29(Seminole Trail)	James City Road	SR 640 (Tryme Road)	
Mathews	0.50	0.80	SR 613 (Beaverdam Road)	Garden Creek Road	SR 611 (Tabernacle Road)	
Mecklenburg	1.37	2.20	Brunswick County Line	Morristown Road	SR 903	
Middlesex	2.60	4.18	SR 603 (Farley Park Road)	Edgehill Road	SR 602 (Wares Bridge Road)	
Montgomery	2.90	4.67	SR 615 (Old Pike Road)	High Rock Hill Road	Floyd County Line	
Nelson	1.50	2.41	SR 151 (Rockfish Valley Highway)	Virginia Lane Truslows Lane Bottoms Lane	Dead End	Gap between segments ending at different points along SR 613
New Kent	6.42	10.33	SR 640 (Old Roxbury Road)	Terminal Road Airport Road Tunstall Road	SR 606 (Old Church Road)	
Northampton	2.00	3.22	Dead End	Old Neck Road	SR 611 (Concord Wharf Road)	
Northumberland	4.37	7.03	SR 600/Richmond County Line	Coan Stage Road Forest Landing Road	Dead End	
Nottoway	5.49	8.84	SR 153 (Rocky Hill Road)	Old Richmond Road	Amelia County Line	
Orange	12.95	20.84	Spotsylvania County	Monrovia Road	SR 20 (Berry Hill Road)	Gap between segments ending at different points along SR 669
Page	2.75	4.43	SR 658	Unnamed road	SR 666 (Batman Hill Road)	
Patrick	2.90	4.67	SR 758 (Willis Road)	Dehart Lane Langhorne Mill	SR 604 (Laurel Creek Road)	Gap between segments ending at different points along SR 610
Pittsylvania	18.78	30.22	Henry County Line	Medical Center Road Wyatt Farm Road Union Hall School Road Banister Road Mitchell Road Hickory Road	SR 57 (Callands Road)	Gap between segments ending at different points along SR 41
Powhatan	1.60	2.57	SR 613 (Judes Ferry Road)	Old Church Road	Dead End	
Prince Edward	6.82	10.98	SR 628 (Leigh Mountain Road/Mountain Creek Road)	Leigh Mountain Road Sandy River Road	SR 607 (Orchard Road)	Gap between segments ending at different points along SR 696
Prince George	0.90	1.45	SR 611 (Lebanon Road)	Cedar Lane	SR 616 (Laurel Springs Road/Pole Run Road)	
Prince William	2.30	3.70	SR 294 (Prince William Parkway)	Yates Ford Road	Fairfax County Line	
Pulaski	1.40	2.25	Dead End	Creek Road	SR 606 (Parrott Mountain Road)	
Rappahannock	4.33	6.97	Dead End	Hull School Road Old Hollow Road	US 211 (Lee Highway)	Gap between segments ending at different points along SR 600
Richmond	4.60	7.40	SR 602 (Cedar Grove Road)	Oakland Road	SR 600 (Ridge Road)	
Roanoke	14.45	23.26	US 11 (West Main Street)	Poor Mountain Road Slings Gap Road Marie Drive	SR 690 (Sugar Camp Creek Drive)	Gap between segments ending at different points along SR 711 Gap between the Franklin County Line and a dead end
Rockbridge	9.68	15.58	Botetourt County Line	Blue Grass Trail	SR 251 (Collierstown Road)	
Rockingham	21.61	34.78	US 33 (Rawley Pike)	Peake Mountain Road Hopkins Gap Road Runions Creek Road Rinker Road Bowers Lane	Shenandoah County Line	Gap between segments ending at different points along SR 259 Gap between dead ends
Russell	3.95	6.36	Scott County Line	Little Duck Road Tower Road	Washington County Line	Gap between segments ending at different points along SR 613
Scott	5.36	8.63	SR 681 (Gillenwater Chapel Road)	Unnamed road Little Duck Road	Russell County Line	Gap between segments ending at different points along SR 71 Gap between dead ends
Shenandoah	5.29	8.51	Rockingham County Line	Mill Creek Road	SR 263 (Orkney Grade)	
Smyth	5.20	8.37	SR 614 (Cedar Springs Road)	Unnamed road	Wythe County Line	
Southampton	13.10	21.08	Sussex County Line	Fortsville Road Rivers Mill Road	SR 655 (Brandy Pond Road/Rock Spring Road)	
Spotsylvania	23.10	37.18	Orange County Line	Monrovia Road Stubbs Bridge Road Pamunkey Road Catharpin Road	SR 610 (Old Plank Road)	Gap between segments ending at different points along SR 719 Gap between segments ending at different points along SR 606 Gap between segments ending at different points along SR 608
Stafford	9.96	16.03	SR 705 (Hartwood Church Road)	Hartwood Road Heflin Road Tacketts Mill Road	Fauquier County Line	Gap between segments ending at different points along SR 616
Surry	6.73	10.83	SR 607 (Huntington Road)	Otterdam Road	SR 611 (Salisbury Road)	Gap between segments ending at different points along SR 40
Sussex	5.70	9.17	Southampton County Line	Proctor Road Unnamed road	SR 609 (Lebanon Church Road)	Gap between segments ending at different points along SR 611
Tazewell	5.62	9.04	SR 627 (Bandy Road)	Greasy Creek Road	Buchanan County Line	
Warren	3.10	4.99	SR 611/SR 840	Gafia Lodge Road	SR 626	
Washington	3.19	5.13	SR 802 (Mendota Road)	Pinnacle Road	Russell County Line	
Westmoreland	15.31	24.64	Dead End	Coles Point Road Tavern Run Road Nomini Hall Road Antioch Road Woodbine Road	Dead End	Gap between segments ending at different points along SR 202 Gap between segments ending at different points along SR 600
Wise	6.14	9.88	Dead End	Unnamed road	SR 610	Gap between segments ending at different points along SR 613 Gap between segments ending at different points along SR 610
Wythe	5.01	8.06	Smyth County Line	Unnamed road Dry Road	SR 749 (Cedar Springs Road)	
York	0.24	0.39	SR 611 (Maynor Drive)/Begin Loop	Maynor Drive	End Loop	
