= Virginia State Route 631 =

State highway in Virginia, United States

State Route 631

Route information
- Maintained by VDOT

Location
- Country: United States
- State: Virginia

Highway system
- Virginia Routes; Interstate; US; Primary; Secondary; Byways; History; HOT lanes

State Route 631 (SR 631) in the U.S. state of Virginia is a secondary route designation applied to multiple discontinuous road segments among the many counties. The list below describes the sections in each county that are designated SR 631.

== List ==
County	Length (mi)	Length (km)	From	Via	To	Notes
Accomack	2.85	4.59	Dead End	Hacksneck Road	SR 180 (Harborton Road)	
Albemarle	15.22	24.49	Dead End	Appleberry Mountain Road Old Lynchburg Road 5th Street Extension 5th Street Rio Road	SR 743 (Hydraulic Road)	Gap between segments ending at different points along SR 712 (Plank Road) Gap between segments ending at different points along the Charlottesville City Limits
Alleghany	0.08	0.13	SR 625 (East Dolly Ann Drive)	Long Avenue	Dead End	
Amelia	1.12	1.80	SR 604 (Chula Road)	Coverly Road	Dead End	
Amherst	3.86	6.21	US 60	Mount Pleasant Road Stonewall Creek Road	SR 625 (Gidsville Road)	Gap between segments ending at different points along SR 617
Appomattox	5.52	8.88	SR 616 (Old Grist Mill Road)	Tents Mill Road Oakleigh Avenue	US 460 Bus/SR 131	
Augusta	3.66	5.89	SR 608 (Tinkling Spring Road)	Ladd Road	SR 664 (Lyndhurst Road)	
Bath	0.70	1.13	Dead End	Indian Hill Road	SR 42 (Cow Pasture River Road)	
Bedford	1.30	2.09	Campbell County Line	Mount Airy Road	SR 630 (Chellis Ford Road)	
Bland	1.75	2.82	SR 612 (Kimberling Road)	Pinch Creek Road	Dead End	
Botetourt	1.18	1.90	SR 630 (Springwood Road)	Penn Hollow Road	SR 43 (Narrow Passage Road)	
Brunswick	9.10	14.65	SR 606 (Old Bridge Road)	Quail Hollow Lane Antioch Road Windmill Road	SR 609 (Cutbank Road)	Gap between segments ending at different points along SR 630
Buchanan	2.50	4.02	Dickenson County Line/SR 768	Middle Fork	Dead End	
Buckingham	10.92	17.57	US 15 (James Madison Highway)	Buffalo Road Troublesome Creek Road Mohawk Road	SR 633 (Oak Hill Road)	
Campbell	1.85	2.98	Dead End	Mount Airy Road	Bedford County Line	
Caroline	1.90	3.06	SR 2 (Fredericksburg Turnpike)	Farmer Drive	Dead End	
Carroll	1.50	2.41	SR 608 (Pilot View Road)	Old Mill Road	SR 638 (Bellspur Road)	
Charles City	3.80	6.12	SR 618 (Adkins Road)	Cool Hill Road	SR 609 (Barnetts Road)	
Charlotte	4.10	6.60	SR 601 (Keysville Road)	Rocky Road Garden Road Kings Cross Road	SR 607 (Roanoke Station Road)	Gap between segments ending at different points along US 15
Chesterfield	6.38	10.27	SR 669 (Sandy Ford Road)	Rhodes Lane Bradley Bridge Road	SR 625 (Branders Bridge Road)	Gap between segments ending at different points along SR 626
Clarke	0.50	0.80	SR 723 (Old Winchester Road)	Page Brook Lane	Dead End	
Craig	0.54	0.87	SR 42	Cloverhollow Trail	Dead End	
Culpeper	0.60	0.97	Dead End	Muddy Run Lane	SR 630 (Jamesons Mill Road)	
Cumberland	4.90	7.89	SR 45 (Cumberland Road)	Davenport Road	SR 600 (Stoney Point Road)	
Dickenson	11.04	17.77	SR 1014 (Wave Drive)	Brush Creek Road Unnamed road	Wise County Line	Gap between segments ending at different points along SR 624
Dinwiddie	3.50	5.63	SR 613 (White Oak Road)	Claiborne Road	US 460/SR 708	
Essex	8.90	14.32	SR 635 (Elevon Road)	Lloyds Road Daingerfield Landing	Dead End	
Fairfax	0.30	0.48	SR 633 (Kings Highway)	Franklin Street	US 1 (Richmond Highway)	
Fauquier	3.80	6.12	Dead End	Snake Castle Road Royalls Mill Road	SR 615 (Silver Hill Road)	Gap between segments ending at different points along SR 651
Floyd	6.70	10.78	SR 655 (Higgs Road)	Sumpter Road Duncan Valley Road Sawmill Hill Road	SR 750 (Alum Ridge Road)	Gap between segments ending at different points along SR 787
Fluvanna	10.81	17.40	SR 601 (Venable Road)	Dogwood Drive Hunters Lodge Road Troy Road	US 250 (Richmond Road)	
Franklin	1.87	3.01	SR 632 (Mount Carmel Road)	Bowles Valley Road	Dead End	
Frederick	3.77	6.07	SR 628 (Middle Road)	Marlboro Road Fairfax Street	US 11/SR 277	
Giles	0.18	0.29	Dead End	Giles Street	SR 1404 (Snidow Street)	
Gloucester	1.80	2.90	SR 616 (Clay Bank Road)	Gun Fork Road	SR 614 (Hickory Fork Road)	
Goochland	0.65	1.05	Dead End	Scott Road	US 522 (River Road)	
Grayson	5.70	9.17	US 58 (Grayson Parkway)	Old Ferry Road Money Branch Road Crackers Neck Road	SR 637 (Englewood Road)	Gap between segments ending at different points along SR 636
Greene	1.92	3.09	Dead End	Haneytown Road	SR 810 (Dyke Road)	
Greensville	4.97	8.00	North Carolina State Line	Spring Church Road Unnamed road	North Carolina State Line	
Halifax	0.60	0.97	SR 644 (Nathalie Road)	Railroad Drive	SR 630 (Doctor Merritt Road)	
Hanover	9.30	14.97	Louisa County Line	Old Ridge Road	SR 738 (Teman Road)	
Henry	1.21	1.95	Patrick County Line	Windward Drive	SR 695 (George Taylor Road)	
Highland	2.00	3.22	US 250	Unnamed road	SR 629	
Isle of Wight	0.60	0.97	SR 611 (Joyners Bridge Road)	Maynards Store Road	SR 630 (Lawrence Drive)	
James City	5.95	9.58	SR 610 (Forge Road)	Little Creek Dam Road Chickahominy Road	US 60 (Richmond Road)	
King and Queen	19.48	31.35	Dead End	Frazier Ferry Road Bunker Hill Road Stevensville Road Poor House Lane Norwood Road Fleets Mill Road Smithfield Road	SR 619 (Owens Manor Road)	Three gaps between segments ending at different points along SR 14 Gap between segments ending at different points along SR 620 Gap between segments ending at different points along US 360
King George	4.52	7.27	Dead End	Millbank Road	SR 610 (Millbank Road/Powhatan Road)	
King William	1.40	2.25	Dead End	Marl Hill Road	SR 30 (King William Road)	
Lancaster	0.30	0.48	Dead End	Sunset Drive	SR 222 (Weems Road)/SR 708 (King Carter Lane)	
Lee	1.00	1.61	Dead End	Willis Chapel Road	SR 630 (Big Hill Road)	
Loudoun	2.00	3.22	SR 764 (Buchannon Gap Road)	New Mountain Road	US 50 (John S Mosby Highway)	
Louisa	1.90	3.06	US 33 (Jefferson Highway)	Windyknight Road	Hanover County Line	
Lunenburg	7.50	12.07	Mecklenburg County Line	Meherrin River Road Lees Mill Road	SR 622 (Ontario Road)	Gap between segments ending at different points along SR 630
Madison	7.70	12.39	US 15 (James Madison Highway)	Meander Run Road Leon Road Kirtley Road	US 29 (Seminole Trail)	Gap between segments ending at different points along SR 618 Gap between US 29 and SR 612
Mathews	1.20	1.93	SR 198	Chapel Lane	Dead End	
Mecklenburg	3.71	5.97	SR 630 (Belfield Road)	Boxwood Road	Dead End	
Middlesex	1.40	2.25	SR 33 (General Puller Highway)	North End Road	SR 709 (Northend Road)	
Montgomery	2.36	3.80	Dead End	Brake Road	US 11 (Roanoke Road)	
Nelson	2.30	3.70	SR 840 (Lobbans Lane/Tan Bark Drive)	Mountain Road	SR 6 (Afton Mountain Road)	
New Kent	2.69	4.33	SR 106 (Roxbury Road)	South Garden	SR 615 (Mountcastle Road)	
Northampton	2.30	3.70	US 13 Bus (Courthouse Road)	Willow Oak Road Indiantown Road	Dead End	
Northumberland	1.60	2.57	SR 630 (Walnut Point Road)	Clarketown Road	Dead End	
Nottoway	2.20	3.54	SR 619 (Creek Road)	Good Hope Road	US 360 (Patrick Henry Highway)	
Orange	2.50	4.02	SR 612 (Monrovia Road)	Brick Church Road	SR 20 (Constitution Highway)	
Page	1.90	3.06	SR 611 (Farmview Road)	Unnamed road	SR 633 (Mill Creek Crossroads)	
Patrick	38.76	62.38	SR 773 (Ararat Highway)	Hunters Chapel Road Doe Run River Road Raven Rock Road Pond Road Squirrel Creek Road Ike State Lane Sal Hooker Hollow Road Dobyns Road South Main Street Wayside Road Clark House road Little Russell Creek Moorefield Store Road Virginia NC Road	Henry County Line	Gap between segments ending at different points along SR 675 Gap between segments ending at different points along SR 648 Gap between dead ends Gap between SR 631 and SR 787 Gap between segments ending at different points along SR 8
Pittsylvania	6.90	11.10	SR 640 (Renan Road)	Dews Road	SR 640 (Wards Road)	
Powhatan	1.90	3.06	Dead End	Clayton Road	SR 13 (Old Buckingham Road)	
Prince Edward	0.25	0.40	SR 604 (Abilene Road)	Slaydon Road	Dead End	
Prince George	2.62	4.22	SR 604 (Halifax Road)	Lansing Road	SR 638 (Templeton Road)	
Prince William	2.88	4.63	SR 806 (Token Valley Road)	Kahns Road	Dead End	
Pulaski	0.80	1.29	SR 619 (Izaak Walton League Road)	Clapboard Lane	SR 605 (Little River Dam Road)	
Rappahannock	1.80	2.90	SR 630 (Riley Hollow Road)	Mill Hill Road	Dead End	
Richmond	1.30	2.09	Dead End	Fox Hunters Hill Road	SR 630 (Wellfords Wharf Road)	
Roanoke	0.12	0.19	SR 603 (Bonsack Road)	Cook Creek Road	Dead End	
Rockbridge	16.68	26.84	Dead End	Muddy Lane Union School Road Still House Road Big Spring Drive Furrs Mill Road Old Buena Vista Road	Buena Vista City Limits	Gap between SR 850 and US 60
Rockingham	0.30	0.48	Dead End	Dull Hunt Road	SR 818 (Little Dry River Road)	
Russell	1.45	2.33	SR 615 (Back Valley Road)	Crackers Neck Road	Dead End	
Scott	0.38	0.61	Tennessee State Line	Unnamed road	SR 614	
Shenandoah	0.95	1.53	SR 622 (Clary Road)	Pine Grove Road	SR 629 (Oranda Road)	
Smyth	1.60	2.57	SR 610 (Valley Road)	Unnamed road	SR 630 (Long Hollow Road)	
Southampton	5.40	8.69	SR 645 (Vicksville Road)	Corinth Road Mission Church Road	SR 614 (Seacock Chapel Road)	Gap between segments ending at different points along SR 603
Spotsylvania	0.21	0.34	SR 208 (Courthouse Road)	American Legion Drive	SR 208 (Courthouse Road)	
Stafford	2.73	4.39	US 1 (Jefferson Davis Highway)	Bells Hill Road Coal Landing Road	Dead End	
Surry	1.31	2.11	SR 622 (Runnymeade Road)	Green Swamp Road	Dead End	
Sussex	20.76	33.41	US 301 (Blue Star Highway)	Jarratt Avenue Henry Road Gary Road Unnamed road	SR 35 (Jerusalem Plank Road)	Gap between segments ending at different points along SR 645 Gap between segments ending at different points along SR 735
Tazewell	14.16	22.79	Richlands Town Limits	Jones Chapel Road Indian Creek Road Baptist Valley Road	SR 16 (Adria Road)	Gap between segments ending at different points along US 460 Bus
Warren	7.40	11.91	SR 622 (Buck Mountain Road)	William Vincent Road Gooney Manor Loop	SR 613 (Bentonville Road)/SR 649 (Browntown Road)	
Washington	1.20	1.93	SR 630 (Cove Creek Road)	Potters Road	SR 700 (Rich Valley Road)	
Westmoreland	4.05	6.52	SR 205 (James Monroe Highway)	Longfield Road	SR 205 (Ridge Road)	
Wise	4.08	6.57	SR 83	Unnamed road	Dickenson County Line	
Wythe	5.50	8.85	SR 619 (Austinville Road)	Walton Furnace Road	SR 634 (Lots Gap Road)	
York	1.69	2.72	SR 718 (Hornsbyville Road)	Waterview Road	Dead End	
