= Virginia State Route 629 =

State highway in Virginia, United States

State Route 629

Route information
- Maintained by VDOT

Location
- Country: United States
- State: Virginia

Highway system
- Virginia Routes; Interstate; US; Primary; Secondary; Byways; History; HOT lanes

State Route 629 (SR 629) in the U.S. state of Virginia is a secondary route designation applied to multiple discontinuous road segments among the many counties. The list below describes the sections in each county that are designated SR 629.

== List ==
County	Length (mi)	Length (km)	From	Via	To	Notes
Accomack	0.50	0.80	SR 628 (Country Club Road)	Boggs Wharf Road	Dead End	
Albemarle	1.30	2.09	SR 810 (Blackwells Hollow Road/Browns Gap Turnpike)	Browns Gap Turnpike	Dead End	
Alleghany	4.35	7.00	I-64	Douthat Road	Bath County Line	
Amelia	1.59	2.56	SR 609 (Grub Hill Church Road)	Elm Cottage Road	SR 630 (Winterham Road)	
Amherst	6.00	9.66	Dead End	Little Piney Road	SR 666 (Woodson Road)	
Appomattox	4.80	7.72	Pamplin City Town Line	Lukin Road Little Cub Road	SR 630 (Old Evergreen Road)	Gap between segments ending at different points along SR 628
Augusta	11.65	18.75	Bath County Line	Deerfield Valley Road	US 250 (Hankey Mountain Highway)	
Bath	32.33	52.03	Alleghany County Line	Douthat Park Road McClung Drive Deerfield Road	Augusta County Line	Gap between segments ending at different points along SR 39 Gap between segments ending at different points along SR 678
Bedford	0.60	0.97	Campbell County Line	Ford Meadows Road	SR 628 (Bishop Creek Road)	
Bland	1.30	2.09	SR 606 (Wilderness Road)	Flat Top Road	Dead End	
Botetourt	2.34	3.77	SR 628 (Prease Road)	Davis Run	SR 625 (Mount Joy Road)	
Brunswick	6.68	10.75	SR 616 (Lew Jones Road)	Rawlings Road	US 1 (Boydton Plank Road)	
Buchanan	14.07	22.64	US 460	Unnamed road Big Branch Road	SR 680	Gap between segments ending at different points along SR 680
Buckingham	3.67	5.91	US 60 (James Madison Highway)	Rosney Road	US 15 (Main Street)	
Campbell	0.18	0.29	Dead End	Hone Road	SR 699 (Gladys Road)	
Caroline	0.80	1.29	SR 609 (Woodslane Road)	Minarchi Road	SR 2 (Fredericksburg Turnpike)	
Carroll	0.40	0.64	SR 628 (Burkes Fork Road)	Long Mountain Road	Floyd County Line	
Charles City	0.46	0.74	Dead End	Alpine Road	Dead End	
Charlotte	2.00	3.22	Lunenburg County Line	Juniper Creek Road Southern Drive	Keysville Town Line	Gap between segments ending at different points along US 15 Bus/US 360 Bus
Chesterfield	1.00	1.61	SR 602 (River Road)	Eanes Road	Dead End	
Clarke	0.10	0.16	SR 255 (Bishop Meade Highway)	Linden Road	Dead End	
Craig	5.72	9.21	SR 42	Unnamed road Northside Road Unnamed road	SR 667	
Culpeper	7.10	11.43	US 522 (Sperryville Pike)	Scotts Mill Road Settle School Road	SR 628 (Hazel River Road)	Gap between segments ending at different points along SR 729
Cumberland	5.75	9.25	US 60 (Anderson Highway)	Oak Hill Road	SR 622 (Trents Mill Road)/SR 627 (Barter Hill Road)	
Dickenson	0.15	0.24	Dead End	Unnamed road	SR 631 (Brush Creek Road)	
Dinwiddie	1.18	1.90	SR 627 (Courthouse Road)	Anderson Mill Road	Dead End	
Essex	3.60	5.79	SR 627 (Mount Landing Road)	Battery Road	SR 624 (Essex Church Road)	
Fairfax	5.88	9.46	Mount Vernon Memorial Highway	Vernon View Drive Fort Hunt Road	SR 1301 (Old Richmond Highway)	
Fauquier	7.00	11.27	SR 601 (Hopewell Road)	Bull Run Mountain Road	Loudoun County Line	
Floyd	1.80	2.90	Carroll County Line	Long Mountain Road	SR 758 (Buffalo Mountain Road)	
Fluvanna	5.80	9.33	SR 608 (Rising Sun Road)	Deep Creek Road	SR 626 (Jordan Store Road)	
Franklin	5.99	9.64	SR 890 (Snow Creek Road)	Finnley Road Hatchett Road	SR 890 (Snow Creek Road)	
Frederick	8.90	14.32	SR 631 (Marlboro Road)	Carters Lane Laurel Grove Road	SR 608 (Wardensville Grade)	Gap between segments ending at different points along SR 628
Giles	0.05	0.08	SR 635 (Big Stoney Creek Road)	Branch Creek Lane	Dead End	
Gloucester	7.97	12.83	SR 614 (Robins Neck Road)	Free School Road Warner Hall Road Paige Road T C Walker Road	US 17 Bus (Main Street)	
Goochland	3.12	5.02	SR 606 (Hadensville-Fife Road	Old Fredericksburg Road	Louisa County Line	
Grayson	4.64	7.47	North Carolina State Line	Little River Road	SR 626 (Old Baywood Road/Little River Road)	
Greene	3.93	6.32	SR 743 (Advance Mills Road)	Welsh Run Road	SR 633 (Amicus Road)	
Greensville	9.95	16.01	North Carolina State Line	Unnamed road Lifsey Road Moores Ferry Road Zion Church Road	SR 730 (Low Ground Road)	Gap between segments ending at different points along SR 622
Halifax	0.70	1.13	Dead End	Henrys Trail	SR 603 (Lenning Road)	
Hanover	4.70	7.56	SR 606 (Old Church Road)	Piping Tree Ferry Road	SR 606 (Old Church Road)	
Henry	7.16	11.52	Patrick County Line	Penn Store Road Moores Mill Road	SR 692 (Horsepasture Price Road)	Gap between segments ending at different points along SR 695
Highland	4.18	6.73	US 250	Unnamed road	US 220	
Isle of Wight	0.90	1.45	SR 611 (Joyners Bridge Road)	Dardens Mill Road	SR 641 (Colosse Road)	
James City	1.30	2.09	SR 615 (Ironbound Road)	Hickory Signpost Road	SR 5 (John Tyler Memorial Highway)	
King and Queen	3.11	5.01	King William County Line	Walkerton Road	SR 14 (The Trail)	
King George	4.58	7.37	SR 3 (Kings Highway)	Round Hill Road	Westmoreland County Line	
King William	7.41	11.93	SR 600 (River Road)	Jacks Creek Road Acquinton Church Road Walkerton Road	King and Queen County Line	Gap between segments ending at different points along SR 30
Lancaster	1.31	2.11	SR 630 (Taylors Creek Road)	Lumberlost Road	SR 675 (Black Stump Road)	
Lee	2.67	4.30	US 58 Alt	Chris Barney Road Possum Valley Road	US 58 Bus	
Loudoun	3.10	4.99	Fauquier County Line	Champe Ford Road Cobb House Road	SR 734 (Snickersville Turnpike)	Gap between segments ending at different points along US 50
Louisa	2.70	4.35	Goochland County Line	Cartersville Road	US 522 (Cross County Road)	
Lunenburg	2.80	4.51	Charlotte County Line	Tidewater Road	SR 688 (Ward Corner Road)	
Madison	2.10	3.38	US 29 (Seminole Trail)	Lonnie Burke Road Spring Branch Road	SR 630 (Thoroughfare Road)	Gap between segments ending at different points along SR 607
Mathews	1.72	2.77	SR 198	Ebenezer Church Road	Dead End	
Mecklenburg	2.10	3.38	SR 630 (Belfield Road)	Reed Road	SR 628 (Webb Road)	
Middlesex	6.64	10.69	SR 707 (Grafton Church Road)	Stormont Road	SR 33 (General Puller Highway)	
Montgomery	1.95	3.14	SR 603 (Fork Road)	Bradshaw Road	SR 622 (Bradshaw Road/Flatwoods Road)	
Nelson	1.29	2.08	Dead End	Gullysville Lane	SR 634 (Napier Lane/Monocan Drive)	
New Kent	3.78	6.08	US 60 (Pocahontas Trail)	Pocahontas Trail Boulevard Road Pocahontas Trail	US 60 (Pocahontas Trail)	Gap between segments ending at different points along SR 155
Northampton	1.00	1.61	SR 600 (Seaside Road)	Webb Island Drive	Dead End	
Northumberland	7.92	12.75	Dead End	Coan Harbour Road Bundick Road Coan Wharf Road Font Hill Road Hull Harbor Road	Dead End	Gap between segments ending at different points along SR 614 Gap between segments ending at different points along SR 630 Gap between segments ending at different points along SR 636
Nottoway	1.90	3.06	SR 647 (Jennings Ordinary Road)	Bob White Road	SR 628 (Dutchtown Road)	
Orange	9.58	15.42	SR 651 (Tatum Road/Terrys Run Road)	Orange Springs Road Lahore Road	SR 20 (Constitution Highway)	
Page	6.93	11.15	Dead End	Unnamed road	SR 616 (Leaksville Road)	Gap between segments ending at different points along SR 689 Gap between segments ending at different points along US 340 Bus Gap between segments ending at different points along SR 638
Patrick	0.56	0.90	Henry County Line	Penn Store Road	US 58 (Jeb Stuart Highway)	
Pittsylvania	3.30	5.31	SR 685 (Telegraph Road)	Piney Grove Road	SR 640 (Renan Road)	
Powhatan	8.69	13.99	SR 13 (Old Buckingham Road)	Unnamed road Trenholm Road	SR 684 (Cartersville Road)	
Prince Edward	5.60	9.01	SR 632 (Schultz Mill Road)	Gallion Road Weaver Road Twin Lakes Road	SR 621 (Grape Lawn Road/Twin Lakes Road)	
Prince George	10.82	17.41	Petersburg City Limits	Birdsong Road Rives Road Quaker Road	SR 618 (Hitchcock Road/Queen Street)	Gap between US 301 and the Petersburg City Limits
Prince William	1.46	2.35	Dumfries Town Limits	Mine Road	Dead End	
Pulaski	0.80	1.29	SR 747 (Old Route 11)	Hedge Lane	Dead End	
Rappahannock	2.35	3.78	Dead End	Bean Hollow Road	SR 628 (Dearing Road)	
Richmond	0.43	0.69	SR 620 (Threeway Road)	Bells Drive	Dead End	
Roanoke	0.93	1.50	Roanoke City Limits	Green Ridge Road	SR 628 (Woodhaven Drive)	
Rockbridge	7.10	11.43	Dead End	Unnamed road	SR 850 (Midland Trail)	
Rockingham	0.05	0.08	Dead End	Steel Road	SR 711 (Grassy Creek Road)	
Russell	1.40	2.25	Tazewell County Line	Daw Road	Tazewell County Line	
Scott	7.47	12.02	Tennessee State Line	Unnamed road	US 23	
Shenandoah	3.94	6.34	US 11 (Old Valley Pike)/FR-811 (Loving Lane)	Oranda Road	Dead End	
Smyth	3.10	4.99	SR 610 (Valley Road)	Unnamed road	SR 42 (Bluegrass Trail)	
Southampton	1.90	3.06	SR 619 (Burdette Road)	Line Pine Road	SR 635 (Black Creek Road)	
Spotsylvania	0.56	0.90	SR 628 (Smith Station Road)	Foster Road	SR 208 (Courthouse Road)	
Stafford	0.89	1.43	SR 630 (Courthouse Road)	Andrew Chapel Road	SR 608 (Brooke Road)	
Surry	1.90	3.06	Sussex County Line	Terrapin Swamp Road	SR 617 (White Marsh Road)	
Sussex	0.10	0.16	SR 31	Unnamed road	Surry County Line	
Tazewell	2.02	3.25	SR 724 (Bottom Road)	Daw Road	Richlands Town Line	Gap between segments ending at different points along the Russell County Line
Warren	1.65	2.66	Dead End	Acorn Hill Road	US 340 (Stonewall Jackson Highway)	Gap between segments ending at different points along SR 628
Washington	4.15	6.68	SR 617 (Livingston Creek Road)	Phillips Road Unnamed road	Dead End	Gap between segments ending at different points along SR 616
Westmoreland	0.50	0.80	King George County Line	Round Hill Road	SR 205 (Ridge Road)	
Wise	1.00	1.61	Dead End	Unnamed road	SR 627	
Wythe	2.90	4.67	US 52 (Fort Chiswell Road)	Red Hollow Road	SR 619 (Major Grahams Road)	
York	2.50	4.02	SR 173 (Goodwin Neck Road)	Dandy Loop Road Stillwater Lane	Dead End	
