= Virginia State Route 602 =

State highway in Virginia, United States

State Route 602

Route information
- Maintained by VDOT

Location
- Country: United States
- State: Virginia

Highway system
- Virginia Routes; Interstate; US; Primary; Secondary; Byways; History; HOT lanes

State Route 602 (SR 602) in the U.S. state of Virginia is a secondary route designation applied to multiple discontinuous road segments among the many counties. The list below describes the sections in each county that are designated SR 602.

== List ==
County	Length (mi)	Length (km)	From	Via	To	Notes
Accomack	0.55	0.89	Northampton County Line	Lee Street	SR 178 (Belle Haven Road)	
Albemarle	6.45	10.38	Dead End	Howardsville Turnpike	SR 800 (Schyler Road)	
Alleghany	9.10	14.65	West Virginia State Line	Big Ridge Road	SR 311 (Kanawha Trail)	
Amelia	5.20	8.37	SR 153 (Military Road)	Bevils Bridge Road	Chesterfield County Line	
Amherst	0.40	0.64	US 60 (Richmond Highway)	Park Lane	Dead End	
Appomattox	2.90	4.67	SR 601 (Cutbanks Road)	Mount Pleasant Road	SR 626 (Holiday Lake Road)	
Augusta	8.78	14.13	Rockbridge County Line	Walker Creek Road Summerdean Road	SR 876 (Mich Barn Road)	Gap between segments ending at different points along SR 681
Bath	0.51	0.82	SR 42 (Cow Pasture River Road)	Coffee Pot Road	SR 42 (Cow Pasture River Road)	
Bedford	3.00	4.83	Dead End	Hunting Creek Road Powell School Road	SR 637 (Camden Road)	Gap between segments ending at different points along SR 122
Bland	3.60	5.79	Dead End	Spur Branch Road	SR 601 (Little Creek Highway)	
Botetourt	1.30	2.09	SR 640 (Brughs Mill Road)	Muse Road	US 220 (Roanoke Road)	
Brunswick	7.30	11.75	SR 611 (Dry Bread Road)	Clarke Road Benton Road	Greensville County Line	Gap between segments ending at different points along SR 671
Buchanan	11.22	18.06	Dickenson County Line	Indian Creek Road Unnamed road	SR 80	Gap between segments ending at different points along SR 688
Buckingham	14.61	23.51	SR 56 (James River Highway)	Howardsville Turnpike	Nelson County Line	Formerly SR 283
Campbell	1.00	1.61	Dead End	Davidson Road	SR 605 (Swinging Bridge Road)	
Caroline	2.99	4.81	SR 652 (Signboard Road)	Concord Road	US 301	
Carroll	5.75	9.25	Grayson County Line	Brush Creek Road Byllesby Road	SR 737 (Buck Dam Road)	Gap between segments ending at different points along SR 94
Charles City	5.69	9.16	SR 155 (Courthouse Road)	Lott Cary Road	SR 609 (Barnetts Road)	
Charlotte	2.00	3.22	SR 609	Barnes Road	SR 601 (Gholson Road)	
Chesterfield	20.25	32.59	Amelia County Line	River Road	SR 36 (River Road)	
Clarke	2.38	3.83	Dead End	Wildcat Hollow Road	US 50 (John S Mosby Highway)	
Craig	0.70	1.13	West Virginia State Line	Back Valley Road	SR 311	
Culpeper	0.60	0.97	SR 649 (Cedar Mountain Drive)	Mortons Lane	SR 652 (Mitchell Road)	
Cumberland	7.59	12.21	SR 45 (Cartersville Road)	Ampt Hill Road	SR 690 (Columbia Road)	
Dickenson	0.50	0.80	SR 80 (Helen Henderson Highway)	Indian Creek Road	Buchanan County Line	
Dinwiddie	0.20	0.32	US 460/SR 622	Corinth Drive	US 460	
Essex	3.71	5.97	US 17 (Tidewater Trail)	Colnbrook Road Ashdale Road	SR 684 (Bowlers Road)	
Fairfax	10.37	16.69	SR 608 (West Ox Road)	Lawyers Road Reston Parkway Seneca Road	Loudoun County Line	Gap between SR 7 and SR 193
Fauquier	17.84	28.71	SR 806 (Elk Run Road)	Old Mill Road Rogues Road Old Carolina Road Germantown Road Rogues Road	Prince William County Line	Gap between SR 610 and SR 28 Two gaps between segments ending at different points along SR 649 Gap between dead ends Gap between segments ending at different points along SR 643 Gap between segments ending at different points along SR 616 Gap between segments ending at different points along SR 670 Gap between segments ending at different points along SR 605
Floyd	2.00	3.22	Dead End	Parkview Church Road Phadettia Road Southwest	SR 799 (Conner Grove Road)	Gap between segments ending at different points along SR 758
Fluvanna	0.35	0.56	SR 605 (Shannon Hill Road)	Greenwood Circle	SR 605 (Shannon Hill Road)	
Franklin	19.42	31.25	SR 40 (Franklin Street)	Ferrum Mountain Road Callaway Road	Roanoke County Line	
Frederick	2.38	3.83	Shenandoah County Line	Paddys Run Road	SR 600 (Vance Road/Oates Road)	
Giles	4.85	7.81	SR 700 (Mountain Lake Road)	Rocky Sink Road	SR 601 (Clover Hollow Road)	
Gloucester	2.40	3.86	SR 3 (John Clayton Memorial Highway)	Burkes Pond Road	SR 198 (Dutton Road)	
Goochland	0.50	0.80	Dead End	Old Stage Road	SR 614 (Dogtown Road)	
Grayson	3.80	6.12	Wythe County Line	Arrowhead Road Brush Creek Road	Carroll County Line	
Greene	1.20	1.93	SR 603 (Bingham Mountain Road)	Sylvia Ridge Road	Dead End	
Greensville	1.38	2.22	Brunswick County Line	Quarrell Road	SR 603 (Macedonia Road)	
Halifax	8.70	14.00	SR 744 (Shady Grove Church Road)	North Fork Church Road Hitesburg Church Road	Mecklenburg County Line	
Hanover	3.29	5.29	Dead End	Mount Hope Church Road	SR 684 (Verdon Road)	
Henry	0.68	1.09	US 58	Club House Road	Dead End	
Highland	0.20	0.32	Dead End	Unnamed road	SR 84	
Isle of Wight	6.10	9.82	Suffolk City Limits	Longview Drive	SR 644 (Bowling Green Road)	
James City	2.21	3.56	York County Line	Fenton Mill Road Old Mill Lane	SR 1629 (Timber Lane)	
King and Queen	9.47	15.24	Dead End	Melrose Landing Road Truhart Road Mount Olive Road Timber Branch Road Wares Church Road	Middlesex County Line	Gap between segments ending at different points along SR 610
King George	0.80	1.29	Stafford County Line	Chapel Green Road	SR 603	
King William	0.48	0.77	SR 604 (Dabneys Mill Road)	Landing Road	SR 604 (Dabneys Mill Road)	
Lancaster	4.95	7.97	SR 3 (Mary Ball Road)	Field Trial Road Miskimon Road	SR 201 (Courthouse Road)	Gap between segments ending at different points along SR 600
Lee	4.25	6.84	SR 600 (Flower Gap Road)	Hickory Hill Road	Scott County Line	
Loudoun	0.44	0.71	SR 671 (Harpers Ferry Road)	Russell Road	SR 671 (Harpers Ferry Road)	
Louisa	2.50	4.02	SR 661 (Crewsville Road)	Copper Line Road Mount Hope Church Road	US 33 (Jefferson Highway)	Gap between segments ending at different points along SR 601
Lunenburg	10.80	17.38	SR 621 (Dix Drive)	Longview Drive	SR 137 (Dundas Road)	
Madison	1.00	1.61	SR 603 (Hughes River Road)	Hughes River Road Nethers Road	Rappahannock County Line	Gap between segments ending at different points along SR 231
Mathews	1.02	1.64	SR 14 (John Clayton Memorial Highway)	Sand Bank Road	Dead End	
Mecklenburg	3.56	5.73	Halifax County Line	White House Road Old Buffalo Church Road	Dead End	
Middlesex	8.33	13.41	King and Queen County Line	Wares Bridge Road Dragon Road Old Virginia Street	Urbanna Town Line	Gap between segments ending at different points along US 17
Montgomery	1.50	2.41	SR 617 (Laurel Ridge Mill Road)	Laurel Ridge Mill Road	SR 8 (Riner Road)	
Nelson	0.21	0.34	SR 626 (James River Road)	Howardsville Turnpike	Buckingham County Line	Formerly SR 283
New Kent	0.56	0.90	SR 155 (Courthouse Road)	Townsend Road	US 60 (Pocahontas Trail)	Gap between segments ending at different points along SR 629
Northampton	1.20	1.93	SR 183 (Occohannock Neck Road)	Cemetery Road	Accomack County Line	
Northumberland	1.26	2.03	SR 610 (Sampsons Wharf Road)	Eagle Point Road	Cul-de-Sac	
Nottoway	2.60	4.18	SR 601 (Flat Rock Road)	Citizens Road	SR 603 (Grove Road)	
Orange	8.50	13.68	SR 741 (Lafayette Drive)	Black Walnut Road Black Walnut Run Road Old Office Road	SR 611 (Zoar Road)	Gap between segments ending at different points along SR 621
Page	4.70	7.56	Rockingham County Line	Maryland Avenue Corner Town Road	SR 650 (River Road)	
Patrick	3.15	5.07	Dead End	Lower Dam Lane Mayberry Church Road	SR 614 (Squirrel Spur Road)	
Pittsylvania	6.58	10.59	SR 628 (Harmony Road)	Moons Road	SR 761 (Straightstone Road)	
Powhatan	2.02	3.25	SR 603 (Rocky Ford Road)	Moyer Road	SR 610 (Schroeder Road)	
Prince Edward	2.72	4.38	US 460 (Prince Edward Highway)	Hubbard Road	SR 617 (Saylers Creek Road)	
Prince George	0.43	0.69	SR 653 (Willow Hill Road/Upper Brandon Road)	Point Road	Dead End	
Prince William	0.45	0.72	Fauquier County Line	Auburn Road	SR 215 (Vint Hil Road)	
Pulaski	0.70	1.13	Dead End	Dry Branch Road	SR 600 (Parrott River Road)	
Rappahannock	0.10	0.16	Madison County Line	Nethers Road	SR 601 (Peola Mills Road)	
Richmond	5.88	9.46	Dead End	Box & Gourd Lane Cedar Grove Road	SR 601 (Maon Road)	Gap between segments ending at different points along SR 3 (History Land Highway)
Roanoke	0.28	0.45	US 221 (Bent Mountain Road)	Clover Hill Road	Franklin County Line	
Rockbridge	18.02	29.00	SR 631 (Big Spring Drive)	Turkey Hill Road Walkers Creek Road	Augusta County Line	Gap between SR 39 and SR 732
Rockingham	8.14	13.10	US 33/SR 981	East Point Road	Page County Line	
Russell	1.84	2.96	SR 71	Ridgeway Drive	SR 609 (High Point Road)	
Scott	0.13	0.21	SR 653 (Mabe Stanleytown Road)	Hunters Valley West	Dead End	
Shenandoah	0.80	1.29	SR 600 (Zepp Road)	Paddys Run	Frederick County Line	
Smyth	1.80	2.90	SR 617 (Davis Valley Road)	Green Mountain Road	SR 617 (Davis Valley Road)	
Southampton	0.50	0.80	SR 629 (Line Pine Road)	No Head Lane	Dead End	
Spotsylvania	1.71	2.75	Dead End	Massey Road	SR 208 (Courthouse Road)	
Stafford	1.63	2.62	SR 218/SR 600	Rufus Road Chapel Green Road	King George County Line	
Surry	9.60	15.45	Sussex County Line	Laurel Springs Road	SR 611 (Salisbury Road)	
Sussex	21.35	34.36	Dead End	Unnamed road Saint Johns Church Road Cabin Point Road Petersburg Road Unnamed road	Surry County Line	Gap between segments ending at different points along SR 618 Gap between segments ending at different points along SR 35
Tazewell	10.16	16.35	SR 604 (Thompson Valley Road)	Pleasant Hill Church Road Claytor Road Laurel Bed Road Bear Town Road	Dead End	Gap between segments ending at different points along SR 16
Warren	0.70	1.13	SR 604 (Harmony Hollow Road)	Moore Road	Dead End	
Washington	2.46	3.96	US 58 (Jeb Stuart Highway)	Azen Road Silver Mountain Road	Dead End	Gap between segments ending at different points along SR 603
Westmoreland	1.75	2.82	SR 203 (Oldhams Road)	Vault Field Road	Dead End	
Wise	3.30	5.31	SR 616	Unnamed road	SR 610 (Powell Valley Road)	
Wythe	6.91	11.12	Grayson County Line	Cripple Creek Road Back Road	SR 690 (Cripple Creek Road)	Gap between segments ending at different points along SR 619 Gap between segments ending at different points along SR 690
York	3.66	5.89	SR 604 (Barlow Road/Tom Thomas Road)	Fenton Mill Road	James City County Line	
