= Virginia State Route 604 =

State highway in Virginia, United States

State Route 604

Route information
- Maintained by VDOT

Location
- Country: United States
- State: Virginia

Highway system
- Virginia Routes; Interstate; US; Primary; Secondary; Byways; History; HOT lanes

State Route 604 (SR 604) in the U.S. state of Virginia is a secondary route designation applied to multiple discontinuous road segments among the many counties. The list below describes the sections in each county that are designated SR 604.

== List ==
County	Length (mi)	Length (km)	From	Via	To	Notes
Accomack	1.00	1.61	SR 679 (Metompkin Road)	Hog Neck Road	Dead End	
Albemarle	2.54	4.09	SR 664 (Frays Mountain Road)	Buffalo River Road	Greene County Line	
Alleghany	2.20	3.54	SR 311 (Kanawha Trail)	Snake Run Road	Dead End	Gap between segments ending at different points on SR 311
Amelia	7.06	11.36	US 360 (Patrick Henry Highway)	Chula Road Genito Road	Powhatan County Line	Gap between segments ending at different points on SR 616
Amherst	9.39	15.11	US 29 Bus	South Coolwell Drive Bobwhite Road Ebeneezer Road Union Hill Drive	US 60 (Richmond Highway)	
Appomattox	9.12	14.68	Campbell County Line	Bent Creek Road Promise Land Road	SR 727 (Red House Road)	
Augusta	8.45	13.60	Rockbridge County Line	Gibbs Road Lotts Road Broadhead School Road McClures Mill Road	SR 701 (Howardsville Road)	Gap between segments ending at different points along SR 675 Gap between segments ending at different points along SR 620
Bedford	0.80	1.29	US 501 (Lee Jackson Highway)	Riverside Circle	US 501	
Bland	7.97	12.83	SR 42 (Bluegrass Trail)	Walkers Creek Road Point Pleasant Road	Dead End	Gap between segments ending at different points along SR 651
Brunswick	1.55	2.49	Greensville County Line	Doyle Lake Road	Dead End	
Buchanan	9.92	15.96	SR 83	Poplar Gap Road	US 460	
Buckingham	11.57	18.62	US 60 (James Anderson Highway)	Meadow Creek Road Woodland Church Road	SR 693 (Wyland Road)	Gap between segments ending at different points along SR 56
Campbell	5.40	8.69	SR 651 (Bear Creek Road)	Red Oak School Road	Dead End	
Caroline	3.60	5.79	Spotsylvania County Line	Blantons Road Gatewood Road	US 1 (Jefferson Davis Highway)	Gap between segments ending at different points along SR 603
Carroll	0.60	0.97	Grayson County Line	Liberty Hill Road	SR 94 (Ivanhoe Road)	
Charles City	2.60	4.18	SR 106 (Roxbury Road)	Warriner Road	Henrico County Line	
Charlotte	7.73	12.44	SR 709 (Union Cemetery Road)	Roanoke Bridge Road Abilene Road	Prince Edward County Line	
Chesterfield	17.95	28.89	Powhatan County Line	Genito Road Courthouse Road	SR 10 (Iron Bridge Road)	Gap between segments ending at different points along US 360 Gap between segments ending at different points along SR 811
Clarke	5.37	8.64	SR 605 (Morgans Mill Road)	Ebenezer Road	SR 679 (Pine Grove Road)	
Craig	1.30	2.09	SR 605 (Red Brush Road)	Sage Brush Lane	SR 611 (Peaceful Valley Road)	
Culpeper	1.60	2.57	SR 605 (Major Brown Drive)	Emerald Hill Road	Rappahannock County Line	
Cumberland	0.80	1.29	SR 686 (Cedar Plains Road)	Cedar Plains Road	Dead End	
Dickenson	5.20	8.37	SR 63	Unnamed road	Dead End	
Dinwiddie	7.83	12.60	Prince George County Line	Halifax Road	Petersburg City Limits	
Essex	2.40	3.86	King and Queen County Line	Byrds Bridge Road	SR 684 (Howerton Road)	
Fairfax	1.62	2.61	Loudoun County Line	Sugarland Road	SR 7 (Leesburg Pike)	
Fauquier	3.80	6.12	SR 667 (Old Dumfries Road)	Burkwell Road	Prince William County Line	
Floyd	1.47	2.37	SR 727 (Moles Road)	Halls Store Road	SR 799 (Conner Grove Road)	
Fluvanna	4.40	7.08	End State Maintenance	Covered Bridge Road	SR 601 (Venable Road)	
Franklin	0.20	0.32	Dead End	Lilian Naff Road	Henry County Line	
Frederick	5.69	9.16	SR 600 (Pifer Road)	Gravel Springs Road Star Tannery Road	SR 600 (Back Mountain Road)	
Giles	1.35	2.17	SR 700 (Mountain Lake Road)	Zells Mill Road	SR 601 (Clover Hollow Road)	
Gloucester	1.00	1.61	SR 3 (John Clayton Memorial Highway)	Indian Road	SR 605 (Indian Road)	
Goochland	0.44	0.71	US 250 (Broad Street)	Whitsell Road	Louisa County Line	
Grayson	8.50	13.68	SR 805 (Spring Valley Road)	Jerusalem Road Old Colonial Road Rabbit Hollow Road Liberty Hill Road	Carroll County Line	Gap between segments ending at different points along SR 805 Gap between segments ending at different points along SR 647
Greene	5.78	9.30	Albemarle County Line	Celt Road	SR 624 (Pea Ridge Road)	
Greensville	5.27	8.48	SR 603 (Macedonia Road)	Unnamed road	Brunswick County Line	
Halifax	3.00	4.83	SR 734 (Red Bank Road)	Rip Rap Road	Mecklenburg County Line	
Hanover	1.60	2.57	SR 606 (Studley Road)	Hanover Town Road	SR 605 (River Road)	
Henry	0.94	1.51	Franklin County Line	Lillian Naff Road	SR 606 (Original Henry Road)	
Highland	4.60	7.40	Dead End	Unnamed road	SR 84	
Isle of Wight	1.30	2.09	Suffolk City Limits	Riddick Road	SR 10/SR 32 (Benns Church Road)	
King and Queen	0.70	1.13	SR 614 (Poplar Grove Road/Rock Spring Road)	Byrds Bridge Road	Essex County Line	
King George	0.23	0.37	SR 614 (Potomac Drive)	Twelfth Street	SR 206 (Dahlgren Road)	
King William	18.42	29.64	SR 605 (Old Newcastle Road)	North Carolina Road Dabneys Mill Road Herring Creek Road	SR 600 (River Road)	Gap between segments ending at different points along SR 30
Lancaster	10.08	16.22	SR 354 (River Road)	Ottoman Ferry Road Merry Point Road Regina Road	SR 615 (Crawfords Corner Road)	Gap between segments ending at different points along SR 3
Lee	12.95	20.84	Tennessee State Line	Blackwater Road AJ Osborne Highway Blackwater Road	Scott County Line	Gap between segments ending at different points along SR 70 Gap between segments ending at different points along SR 600
Loudoun	0.67	1.08	Dead End	Alcott Way Sugarland Road	Fairfax County Line	
Louisa	7.26	11.68	Goochland County Line	Roundabout Road	SR 646 (Yanceyville Road)	
Lunenburg	5.00	8.05	SR 137 (Dundas Road)	Sugar Hill Road	SR 601 (Fletcher Chapel Road)	
Madison	6.10	9.82	SR 603 (Hebron Valley Road)	Towles Road Arrington Mountain Road Novum Road Mitchell Mountain Road	SR 605 (Parish Road)	Gap between segments ending at different points along SR 606
Mathews	1.08	1.74	Dead End	Antioch Road	SR 14 (John Clayton Memorial Highway)	
Mecklenburg	5.20	8.37	North Carolina State Line	Willards Mill Road	Halifax County Line	
Middlesex	3.80	6.12	Dead End	Bay Port Road Nesting Road	Dead End	Gap between segments ending at different points along SR 605
Montgomery	1.85	2.98	US 11 (Radford Road)	Plum Creek Road	US 11 (Radford Road)	
Nelson	3.10	4.99	SR 626 (James River Road)	Warminister Road	SR 646 (Hunting Lodge Road)	
New Kent	2.20	3.54	SR 155 (Courthouse Road)	Poindexter Road	SR 249 (New Kent Highway)	
Northampton	0.80	1.29	SR 618 (Hadlock Lane)	Bayside Drive Oakland Drive	SR 600 (Seaside Road)	
Northumberland	14.84	23.88	SR 600	Dodlyt Road Hazard Road Indian Valley Road Sydnors Millpond Road Mob Neck Road	SR 1221 (Riverview Road)	Gap between segments ending at different points along SR 601 Gap between segments ending at different points along SR 201 Gap between segments ending at different points along US 360 Gap between segments ending at different points along SR 640
Nottoway	5.72	9.21	SR 40 (Kenbridge Road)	Stingy Lane Road	SR 600 (Snead Spring Road)	
Orange	2.40	3.86	Dead End	Gold Dale Lane Gold Dale Road	SR 611 (Parker Road)	
Page	2.90	4.67	Rockingham County Line	Loop Road	Rockingham County Line	
Patrick	1.60	2.57	SR 609 (Belcher Mountain Road)	Helms Road Laurel Creek Road	SR 764 (Mountain View Road)	Gap between segments ending at different points along SR 610
Pittsylvania	4.50	7.24	SR 761 (Straightstone Road)	Glade Road	SR 761 (Straightstone Road)	
Powhatan	4.82	7.76	Amelia County Line	Genito Road	Chesterfield County Line	
Prince Edward	7.56	12.17	SR 671 (County Line Road)	Abilene Road	SR 665 (Abilene Road)	
Prince George	2.50	4.02	Dinwiddie County Line	Halifax Road	US 301/SR 623	
Prince William	3.40	5.47	Fauquier County Line	Burwell Road	Dead End	
Pulaski	0.56	0.90	SR 621 (Brooklyn Road)	Annie Akers Road	SR 621 (Brooklyn Road)	
Rappahannock	2.90	4.67	Culpeper County Line	Green Road Round Hill Road	US 522 (Zachary Taylor Avenue)	Gap between segments ending at different points along SR 707
Richmond	0.60	0.97	Dead End	Preachers Rest Road	SR 600 (Ridge Road)	
Rockbridge	1.62	2.61	SR 606 (Raphine Road)	Gibbs Run Lane	Augusta County Line	
Rockingham	0.70	1.13	Dead End	Allman Road	SR 257 (Briery Branch Road)	
Russell	8.24	13.26	SR 71	Molls Creek Road Copper Ridge Road	US 58 Alt	Gap between segments ending at different points along SR 609
Scott	8.87	14.27	Lee County Line	Unnamed road Pattonsville Road	US 58 (Duff Pat Highway)	Gap between segments ending at different points along SR 638
Shenandoah	3.82	6.15	Dead End	Unnamed road Fairview Road	Woodstock Town Limits	Gap between segments ending at different points along SR 623
Smyth	7.33	11.80	Washington County Line	Mill Creek Road Ramblewood Road		Gap between segments ending at different points along SR 600 VDOT data appears to be incomplete for this route
Southampton	0.01	0.02	SR 618	Mount Hope Road	Surry County Line	
Spotsylvania	1.93	3.11	SR 605 (Marye Road)	Blanton Road	Caroline County Line	
Stafford	7.28	11.72	Dead End	Belle Plains Road McCarty Road	SR 601 (Forest Lane Road)	Gap between segments ending at different points along SR 603
Surry	6.21	9.99	Southampton County Line	Owens Grove Road	Sussex County Line	Gap between segments ending at different points along SR 617 Gap between segments ending at different points along SR 31
Sussex	11.81	19.01	SR 634	Unnamed road Summefield Road Chiquapin Road Owens Grove Road	Surry County Line	Gap between segments ending at different points along SR 606
Tazewell	11.72	18.86	SR 91 (Maiden Spring Road)	Thompson Valley Road Upper Valley Road	SR 602 (Bear Town Road/Laurel Bed Road)	Gap between segments ending at different points along SR 16
Warren	3.65	5.87	Dead End	Harmony Hollow Road	US 522	
Washington	4.30	6.92	Smyth County Line	Mill Creek Road Bishop Road	SR 762 (Loves Mill Road)	Gap between segments ending at different points along SR 605
Westmoreland	6.97	11.22	SR 203 (Oldhams Road)	Sandy Point Road	SR 610 (Tucker Hill Road)	
Wise	0.59	0.95	Dead End	Unnamed road	SR 612	
Wythe	0.80	1.29	SR 619 (Austinville Road)	Olive Branch Road	SR 605 (Dunford Road)	
York	2.63	4.23	FR 137 (Rochambeau Drive)	Tom Thomas Road Barlow Road	SR 1627 (Londonderry Lane)	
