= Virginia State Route 155 =

State highway in eastern Virginia, US

State Route 155
- Courthouse Road

Route information
- Maintained by VDOT
- Length: 13.53 mi (21.77 km)
- Existed: 1933–present

Major junctions
- South end: SR 5 / SR 644 in Charles City
- US 60 at Providence Forge; I-64 / SR 33 near Carps Corner
- North end: SR 249 / SR 608 at Carps Corner

Location
- Country: United States
- State: Virginia
- Counties: Charles City, New Kent

Highway system
- Virginia Routes; Interstate; US; Primary; Secondary; Byways; History; HOT lanes
← SR 154	→ SR 156

State Route 155 (SR 155) is a primary state highway in the U.S. state of Virginia. Known as Courthouse Road, the state highway runs 13.53 miles (21.77 km) from SR 5 in Charles City north to SR 249 at Carps Corner. SR 155 connects Charles City and New Kent, the county seats of Charles City County and New Kent County, respectively, with each other and with U.S. Route 60 (US 60) and Interstate 64 (I-64).

== Route description ==
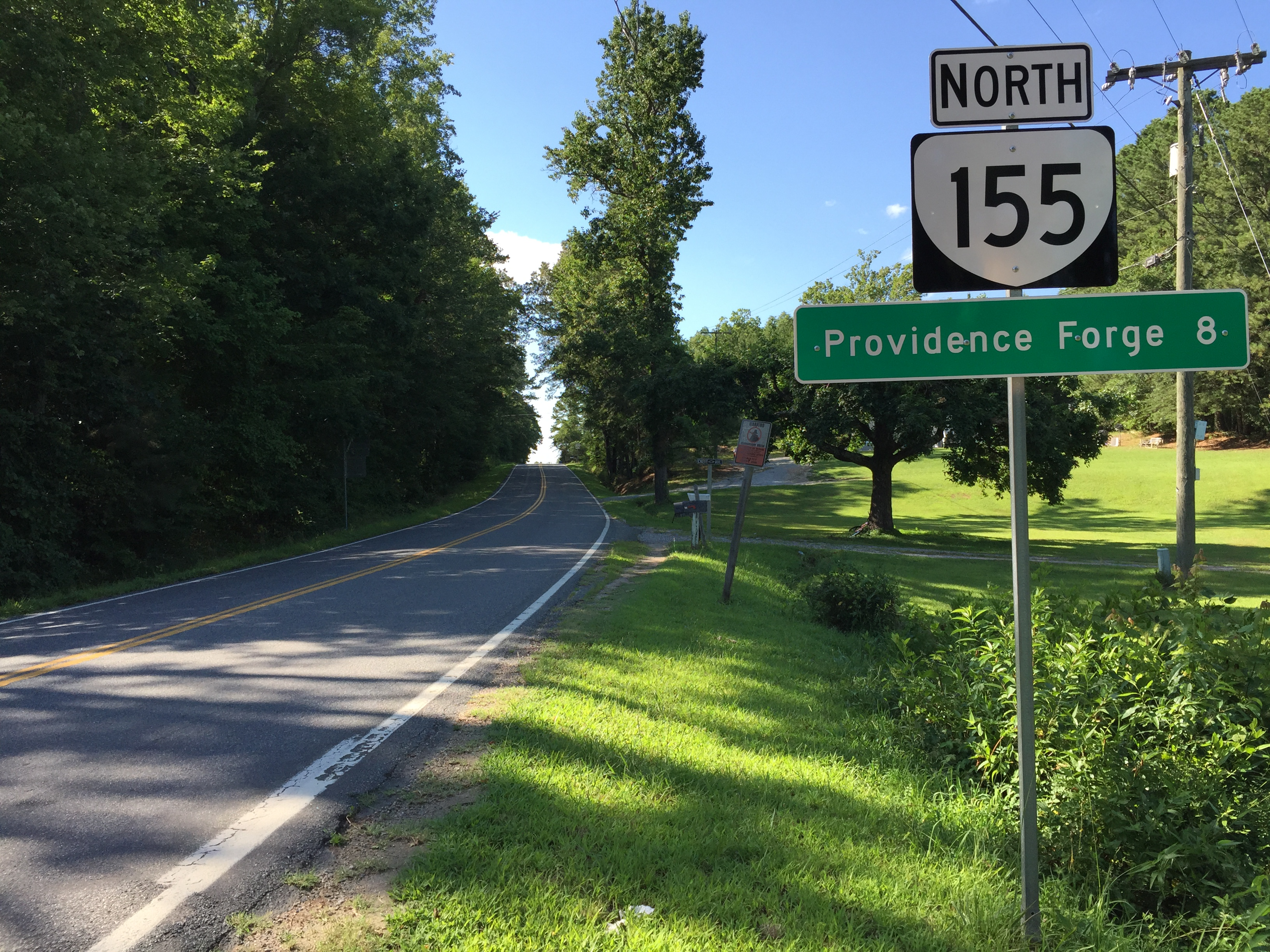
View north along SR 155 at SR 5 and SR 644 in Charles City

SR 155 begins at a four-way intersection with SR 5 (John Tyler Memorial Highway) in Charles City. Courthouse Road continues south as SR 644 to serve the Charles City County offices and courthouse. SR 155 heads north past Charles City Middle School and Charles City High School and passes through the hamlets of Roaches Corner and Sandybottom. The state highway crosses the Chickahominy River into New Kent County. At Providence Forge, SR 155 curves northwest through an oblique grade crossing of CSX's Peninsula Subdivision, veers west on Boulevard Road, then makes a right-angle turn north and intersects US 60 (Pocahontas Trail). The state highway intersects Kentland Trail, which leads east to several golf courses and horse-racing facility Colonial Downs, just south of its diamond interchange with I-64 and its companion SR 33. SR 155 passes to the east of the historic home Criss Cross before reaching its northern terminus at SR 249 (New Kent Highway) at Carps Corner a short distance west of New Kent.

== Major intersections ==
County	Location	mi	km	Destinations	Notes
Charles City	Charles City	0.00	0.00	SR 5 (John Tyler Memorial Highway) / SR 644 (Courthouse Road) – Charles City CH, Williamsburg, Richmond	Southern terminus
New Kent	Providence Forge	7.51	12.09	US 60 (Pocahontas Trail) – Richmond, Williamsburg	
New Kent		11.34	18.25	I-64 / SR 33 – Richmond, Norfolk	Exit 214 (I-64)
New Kent	Carps Corner	13.53	21.77	SR 249 (New Kent Highway) / SR 608 (Old River Road) – Richmond, New Kent CH	Northern terminus
1.000 mi = 1.609 km; 1.000 km = 0.621 mi

< SR 412	District 4 State Routes; 1928–1933	SR 414 >
