= Virginia State Route 601 =

State highway in Virginia, United States

State Route 601

Route information
- Maintained by VDOT

Location
- Country: United States
- State: Virginia

Highway system
- Virginia Routes; Interstate; US; Primary; Secondary; Byways; History; HOT lanes

State Route 601 (SR 601) in the U.S. state of Virginia is a secondary route designation applied to multiple discontinuous road segments among the many counties. The list below describes the sections in each county that are designated SR 601.

== List ==
County	Length (mi)	Length (km)	From	Via	To	Notes
Accomack	0.95	1.53	SR 178 (Belle Haven Road)	Merry Cat Lane County Line Road	Northampton County Line	
Albemarle	18.20	29.29	US 250 Bus (Ivy Road)	Old Ivy Road Old Garth Road Garth Road Free Union Road Mission Home Road	Greene County Line	Gap between segments ending at different points on US 250 Gap between segments ending at different points on SR 676 Gap between segments ending at different points on SR 810
Alleghany	0.60	0.97	West Virginia State Line	Tuckahoe Road	SR 311 (Kanawha Trail)	
Amelia	0.70	1.13	SR 606 (Waldrop Road)	Allen Lane	Dead End	
Amherst	2.39	3.85	SR 600 (Riverville Road)	Galilee Road Snake Road	SR 622 (Allens Creek Road)	Gap between segments ending at different points along SR 846
Appomattox	10.10	16.25	US 460 (Richmond Highway)	Forest Chapel Road Cutbanks Road Planters Town Road	Dead End	Gap between segments ending at different points along SR 627
Augusta	7.05	11.35	Rockbridge County Line	Estaline Valley Road	SR 811	
Bath	5.60	9.01	SR 39 (Mountain Valley Road)	Little Back Creek	Dead End	
Bedford	1.80	2.90	Dead End	Red Hill Road	SR 122 (Big Island Highway)	
Bland	11.40	18.35	SR 617	Little Creek Highway	Pulaski County Line	
Botetourt	0.45	0.72	Roanoke County Line	Shadwell Drive Thrasher Road	Dead End	Gap between US 11 and SR 630
Brunswick	1.50	2.41	SR 602 (Benton Road)	Benton Road	Greensville County Line	
Buchanan	2.20	3.54	Dead End	Convict Highway	SR 609 (Bull Creek Road)	
Buckingham	8.81	14.18	SR 602 (Howardsville Road)	Pattie Road Manteo Road Pattie Road	SR 604 (Woodland Church Road)	
Campbell	11.08	17.83	US 501 (Lynchburg Avenue)	Juniper Cliff Road Hat Creek Road	SR 600 (Sugar Hill Road)	Gap between segments ending at different points along SR 605
Caroline	25.85	41.60	Hanover County Line	Hewlett Road Cedar Fork Road Golansville Road Penola Road Reedy Mill Road Mount Vernon Church Road Edgar Road	King William County Line	Gap between segments ending at different points along SR 658 Gap between segments ending at different points along SR 672 Gap between segments ending at different points along SR 207 Gap between segments ending at different points along SR 600
Carroll	0.90	1.45	SR 94 (Ivanhoe Road)	Rakestown Road	Wythe County Line	
Charles City	0.40	0.64	Dead End	Liberty Church Road	SR 615 (Glebe Lane)	
Charlotte	1.60	2.57	SR 631 (Kings Cross Road)	Keysville Road Gholson Road	US 15 (Barnesville Highway)	
Chesterfield	1.60	2.57	SR 36 (River Road)	Little Road	SR 669 (Church Road)	
Clarke	11.12	17.90	Loudoun County Line	Blue Ridge Mountain Road Raven Rocks Road	West Virginia State Line	Gap between segments ending at the Loudoun County Line
Craig	2.40	3.86	Giles County Line	Rocky Gap Trail	SR 632 (Johns Creek Road)	
Culpeper	1.41	2.27	SR 617 (Winston Road)	Kettle Club Road	US 15 (James Madison Highway)	
Cumberland	4.65	7.48	SR 626 (Meador Road)	Ashburn Road Clinton Road	US 60 (Anderson Highway)	Gap between segments ending at different points along SR 45
Dickenson	4.06	6.53	Buchanan County Line	Indian Creek Road	Russell County Line	
Dinwiddie	5.69	9.16	SR 708 (Namozine Road)	River Road	SR 600 (River Road)	
Essex	2.27	3.65	US 17 (Tidewater Trail)	Mount Prospect Road	Dead End	
Fairfax	1.92	3.09	SR 6040 (Belmont Landing Road)	Belmont Boulevard	SR 242 (Gunston Road)	
Fauquier	4.20	6.76	SR 626 (London Avenue)	Hopewell Road	Prince William County Line	
Floyd	4.00	6.44	SR 740 (White Rock Road)	Lost Bent Road Berry Hill Road River Hill Road	Dead End	Gap between segments ending at different points along SR 739
Fluvanna	13.09	21.07	US 15 (James Madison Highway)	Courthouse Road Venable Road	SR 653 (Three Chopt Road)	Gap between segments ending at different points along SR 659
Franklin	2.03	3.27	Dead End	Dudley Amos Road	SR 616 (Morewood Road)	
Frederick	0.50	0.80	Dead End	Paddys Cove Lane	SR 600 (Vance Road/Oates Road)	
Giles	6.77	10.90	SR 42 (Blue Grass Trail)	Clover Hollow Road Laurel Springs Road Clover Hollow Road	Craig County Line	
Gloucester	4.98	8.01	US 17 (George Washington Memorial Highway)	Pampa Road	SR 198 (Dutton Road)	Gap between segments ending at different points along SR 610
Goochland	2.19	3.52	SR 648 (Matthews Road)	Pryor Road	SR 606 (Hadensville-Fife Road)	
Grayson	18.43	29.66	Smyth County Line	Flat Ridge Road Old Bridle Creek Road Cox Chapel Road	North Carolina State Line	Gap between segments ending at different points along SR 658 Gap between segments ending at different points along US 58 Gap between segments ending at different points along SR 708
Greene	0.90	1.45	Albemarle County Line	Mission Home Road	SR 628 (Simmons Gap Road)	
Greensville	3.00	4.83	Brunswick County Line	Hell Island Road	SR 627 (Brink Road)	
Halifax	7.02	11.30	US 58	Stevens Road Buckshoal Road Virgie Cole Road	Mecklenburg County Line	Gap between segments ending at different points along US 58
Hanover	4.85	7.81	SR 738 (Old Ridge Road)	Hewlett Road	Caroline County Line	
Henry	0.50	0.80	Dead End	Bowens Creek Road	SR 57 (Fairystone Park Highway)	
Highland	1.60	2.57	Dead End	Unnamed road	US 250 (Highland Turnpike)	
Isle of Wight	1.80	2.90	SR 654 (Quaker Road)	Sandy Ridge Drive	Suffolk City Limits	
James City	5.71	9.19	Dead End	Hicks Island Road Barnes Road Holly Forks Road	New Kent County Line	Gap between segments ending at different points along SR 603 Gap between segments ending at different points along SR 30
King and Queen	7.11	11.44	Dead End	Cherry Row Lane Stratton Major Road Pear Tree Avenue Farmville Road Liberty Street	Pear Tree Avenue	Gap between dead ends Gap between segments ending at different points along SR 605 Gap between segments ending at different points along SR 14 Gap between Liberty Street and Pear Tree Avenue
King George	1.30	2.09	SR 631 (Millbank Road)	Gera Road	SR 686 (Mount Rose Drive)	
King William	3.80	6.12	SR 614 (Etna Mills Road)	Calno Road Edgar Road	Caroline County Line	Gap between segments ending at different points along SR 30
Lancaster	0.10	0.16	SR 602 (Miskimon Road)	Bunker Hill Road	Northumberland County Line	
Lee	2.86	4.60	Tennessee State Line	Hillsville Road Greenhouse Road	Scott County Line	Gap between segments ending at different points along SR 600
Loudoun	1.63	2.62	Clarke County Line	Blue Ridge Mountain Road Raven Rocks Road	West Virginia State Line	Gap between segments ending at the Clarke County Line Gap between dead ends
Louisa	20.96	33.73	Dead End	Orchid Road Paynes Mill Road Wickham Road Diggstown Road Bumpass Road Greenes Corner Road	Spotsylvania County Line	Gap between segments ending at different points along US 33 Gap between segments ending at different points along SR 618 Gap between segments ending at different points along SR 715
Lunenburg	4.50	7.24	SR 137	Fletcher Chapel Road	SR 40 (Blackstone Road)	
Madison	0.20	0.32	Dead End	Quarter Run Road	SR 622 (Tanners Road)	
Mathews	1.61	2.59	Dead End	Dyers Creek Road Horn Harbor Avenue	Dead End	Gap between segments ending at different points along SR 602
Mecklenburg	2.55	4.10	Halifax County Line	Love Town Road	SR 732 (Tabernacle Road)	
Middlesex	1.50	2.41	US 17 (Tidewater Trail)	McKans Road	Dead End	
Montgomery	4.00	6.44	SR 602 (Laurel Ridge Mill Road)	Clarence Road Poff School	SR 617 (Brush Creek Road)	
Nelson	0.48	0.77	SR 6 (Irish Road)	Shiloh Loop	SR 632 (Pond Road)	
New Kent	2.58	4.15	James City County Line	Tabernacle Road	SR 600 (Holly Fork Road)	
Northampton	0.56	0.90	Accomack County Line	County Line Road	SR 600 (Seaside Drive)	
Northumberland	7.90	12.71	Lancaster County Line	Bunker Hill Road Gilliams Road Dodlyt Road and Bush Mill Road Rowes Landing Road	Dead End	Gap between segments ending at different points along US 360
Nottoway	6.90	11.10	SR 626 (Hungarytown Road)	Robertsons Road Flat Rock Road	SR 625 (Courthouse Road)	
Orange	4.30	6.92	SR 20 (Constitution Highway)	Flat Run Road	SR 3 (Germanna Highway)	
Page	0.50	0.80	Rockingham County Line	Rinacas Corner Road	Dead End	
Patrick	4.20	6.76	Dead End	Bent Road	SR 614 (Squirrel Spur Road)	
Pittsylvania	4.39	7.07	SR 761 (Straightstone Road)	Hubbard Road	Dead End	
Powhatan	1.46	2.35	US 60	Lockin Road	US 60	
Prince Edward	2.10	3.38	US 460 (Prince Edward Highway)	Aspen Hill Road	SR 619 (Lockett Road)	
Prince George	3.86	6.21	US 460/SR 624	Alden Road	Surry County Line	
Prince William	7.12	11.46	Fauquier County Line	Waterfall Road Shelter Lane	SR 701 (Logmill Road)	Gap between US 15 and SR 234
Pulaski	14.42	23.21	Bland County Line	Little Creek Road	SR 100	Gap between segments ending at different points along SR 738
Rappahannock	1.20	1.93	SR 231 (F T Valley Road)	Peola Mills Road Nethers Road	SR 707 (Sharp Rock Road)	Gap between segments ending at different points along SR 602
Richmond	2.90	4.67	SR 3 (History Land Highway)	Maon Road	SR 600 (Ridge Road)	
Roanoke	2.88	4.63	Roanoke City Limits/SR 115 (Plantation Road)	Hollins Road Shadwell Drive	Botetourt County Line	
Rockbridge	8.58	13.81	SR 39 (Maury River Road)	Unnamed road	Augusta County Line	
Rockingham	2.00	3.22	SR 602 (East Point Road)	Rinacas Corner Road	Page County Line	
Russell	2.70	4.35	SR 621 (Sandy Ridge Road)	Hurricane Fork	Dickenson County Line	
Scott	3.25	5.23	Lee County Line	Beech Grove Road Unnamed road	SR 600	
Shenandoah	5.73	9.22	Dead End	Unnamed road Battlefield Road Unnamed road	SR 648 (Sandy Hook Road)	
Smyth	11.63	18.72	Grayson County Line	Flat Ridge Road Teas Road Pugh Mountain Road	SR 16	Gap between segments ending at different points along SR 670
Southampton	3.60	5.79	SR 605 (Millfield Road)	Kellos Mill Road	Sussex County Line	
Spotsylvania	19.31	31.08	Louisa County Line	Arritt Road Lewiston Road Lawyers Road	SR 608 (Catharpin Road)	Gap between segments ending at different points along SR 208
Stafford	5.13	8.26	SR 3 (Kings Highway)	Forest Lane Road Hollywood Farm Road	SR 3 (Kings Highway)	
Surry	9.53	15.34	Prince George County Line	Laurel Road Huntington Road Camera Road	SR 614 (Three Bridge Road)	Gap between segments ending at different points along SR 602 Gap between segments ending at different points along SR 40
Sussex	0.80	1.29	SR 628 (Courtland Road)	Unnamed road	Southampton County Line	
Tazewell	11.52	18.54	SR 91 (Veterans Road)	Freestone Valley Road Mountain Spring Road	Dead End	Gap between segments ending at different points along SR 16
Warren	1.00	1.61	Dead End	Pomeroy Road	SR 604 (Harmony Hollow Road)	
Washington	2.45	3.94	US 58 (Jeb Stuart Highway)	Beech Mountain Road	US 58 (Jeb Stuart Highway)	
Westmoreland	4.20	6.76	SR 600 (Ebenezer Church Road)	Kings Mill Road	SR 202 (Cople Highway)	
Wise	1.01	1.63	Dead End	Unnamed road	SR 78	
Wythe	0.70	1.13	Carroll County Line	Rakes Town Road	SR 742 (Painters Hill Road)	
York	0.30	0.48	Dead End	Boundary Road	Dead End	
