= Virginia State Route 725 =

Secondary route designation

State Route 725

Route information
- Maintained by VDOT

Location
- Country: United States
- State: Virginia

Highway system
- Virginia Routes; Interstate; US; Primary; Secondary; Byways; History; HOT lanes

State Route 725 (SR 725) in the U.S. state of Virginia is a secondary route designation applied to multiple discontinuous road segments among the many counties. The list below describes the sections in each county that are designated SR 725.

== List ==
County	Length (mi)	Length (km)	From	Via	To	Notes
Accomack	0.30	0.48	SR 712 (Sign Post Road)	Outten Road	SR 713 (Garland Taylor Road)	
Albemarle	0.60	0.97	Dead End	Dawsons Mill Road	SR 627 (Porters Road)	
Amherst	0.25	0.40	US 29 (Amherst Highway)	Kintyre Lane	Dead End	
Augusta	1.78	2.86	SR 720 (Jeruselem Chapel Road)	Chapel Road Whiskey Creek Road	SR 42 (Buffalo Gap Highway)	
Bedford	5.49	8.84	SR 722 (Wilson Church Road)	Phelps Road Pecks Road	SR 714 (Falling Creek Road)	Gap between segments ending at different points along SR 43
Botetourt	0.80	1.29	SR 676 (Gravel Hill Road)	Tucker Road	Dead End	
Campbell	1.10	1.77	SR 811 (Ridge Road/Evington Road)	Ridge Road	SR 682	
Carroll	1.05	1.69	SR 97 (Pipers Gap Road)	Whitney Lane	SR 683 (Poplar Knob Road)	Gap between dead ends
Chesterfield	0.56	0.90	SR 723 (Periwinkle Drive)	Quinnford Boulevard	Dead End	
Dinwiddie	0.17	0.27	Dead End	Cherokee Road	SR 706 (Old Cox Road)	
Fairfax	0.25	0.40	SR 613 (Sleepy Hollow Road)	Malbrook Drive	SR 2274 (Crosswoods Drive)	
Fauquier	0.30	0.48	SR 55 (John Marshall Highway)	Tuckers Lane	Dead End	
Franklin	0.16	0.26	Henry County line	Henry Church Road	Dead End	
Frederick	0.42	0.68	Dead End	North Frederick Pike	SR 679 (Indian Hollow Road)	
Halifax	0.29	0.47	North Carolina state line	Charlie Lawson Road	SR 96 (Virgilina Road)	
Hanover	1.26	2.03	SR 689 (Taylorsville Road)	Binns Road	SR 30 (Kings Dominion Boulevard)	
Henry	0.05	0.08	SR 605 (Henry Road)	Henry Church Road	Franklin County line	
James City	0.14	0.23	SR 1330 (Rolling Woods Drive)	Redbud Lane	SR 724 (Dogwood Drive)	
Loudoun	8.50	13.68	SR 734 (Snickersville Turnpike)	Paxon Road Bolyn Road Hughesville Road	SR 704 (Harmony Church Road)	Gap between dead ends Gap between segments ending at different points along SR 611
Louisa	0.50	0.80	SR 665 (Kennon Road)	Thacker Road	Dead End	
Mecklenburg	0.90	1.45	SR 814 (Dave Winston Road)	Dave Winston Road	SR 723 (Shiney Rock Road)	
Montgomery	0.92	1.48	SR 655 (Long Shop Road/Mount Zion Road)	Poverty Creek Road	Dead End	
Pittsylvania	1.30	2.09	SR 732 (Ferguson Road)	Bennett Drive	SR 726 (Ringgold Church Road)	
Prince George	0.33	0.53	Dead End	River Road	SR 645 (Puddledock Road)	
Prince William	0.36	0.58	SR 1144 (Forestburg Lane)	Williams Road	Dead End	
Pulaski	0.23	0.37	SR 676 (Church Street)	Harry L Brown Road	SR 624 (New River Road)	
Roanoke	0.30	0.48	US 221 (Bent Mountain Road)	Suncrest Road	Dead End	
Rockbridge	2.70	4.35	SR 602 (Walkers Creek Road)	High Rock Road	SR 252 (Brownsburg Turnpike)	Gap between segments ending at different points along SR 620
Rockingham	0.30	0.48	SR 753 (Kratzer Road)	Etna Road	SR 721 (Longs Pump Road)	
Scott	0.60	0.97	SR 653 (Mabe Stanleytown Road)	Unnamed road	Dead End	
Shenandoah	4.30	6.92	SR 611 (Supinlick Ridge Lane)	Morning Star Road	SR 263 (Orkney Grade)	Gap between segments ending at different points along SR 726
Spotsylvania	0.70	1.13	Dead End	Talley Road	SR 613 (Brock Road)	
Stafford	0.40	0.64	Dead End	Cedar Grove Road	US 17 (Warrenton Road)	
Tazewell	0.13	0.21	SR 637 (Dry Fork Road)	Back Alley Drive	Dead End	
Washington	2.20	3.54	Tennessee state line	Taylors Valley Road	Dead End	
Wise	0.80	1.29	US 58	Unnamed road	US 58	
York	0.08	0.13	SR 641 (Penniman Road)	Dodge Drive	SR 726 (Semple Road)	
