= Virginia State Route 719 =

Secondary route designation

State Route 719

Route information
- Maintained by VDOT

Location
- Country: United States
- State: Virginia

Highway system
- Virginia Routes; Interstate; US; Primary; Secondary; Byways; History; HOT lanes

State Route 719 (SR 719) in the U.S. state of Virginia is a secondary route designation applied to multiple discontinuous road segments among the many counties. The list below describes the sections in each county that are designated SR 719.

== List ==
County	Length (mi)	Length (km)	From	Via	To	Notes
Accomack	1.10	1.77	Dead End	Shad Landing Road	SR 695 (Saxis Road)	
Albemarle	4.10	6.60	SR 715 (Esmont Road)	Alberene Road	SR 712 (Plank Road)	
Alleghany	0.23	0.37	Dead End	Unnamed road	SR 661 (Midland Trail)	
Amherst	0.25	0.40	Dead End	Woodvue Drive	US 29 Bus	
Augusta	0.40	0.64	Rockingham County line	Wise Hill Lane	SR 696 (Gratton Hill Road/Crafton Hill Road)	
Bedford	0.15	0.24	SR 647 (Winding Creek Lane)	Clubridge Road	Dead End	
Botetourt	0.15	0.24	Dead End	Mount Beulah Road	SR 718 (Fieldale Road)	
Campbell	0.70	1.13	Dead End	Farmcrest Road	SR 606 (New Chapel Road)	
Carroll	1.20	1.93	SR 713 (Soapstone Road)	Blue Ridge Mill Road	SR 939 (Cockerham Loop)	
Chesterfield	0.28	0.45	SR 626 (Woodpecker Road)	Bixby Lane	SR 669 (Sandy Ford Road)	
Dinwiddie	0.39	0.63	SR 601 (River Road)	Lee Drive	Dead End	
Fairfax	0.67	1.08	SR 703 (Shreve Avenue)	Virginia Lane Hurst Street	SR 695 (Idylwood Road)	
Fauquier	0.23	0.37	SR 691 (Carters Run Road)	Scotts Road Greengarden Road	Loudoun County line	Gap between SR 721/SR 647 and US 50
Franklin	0.52	0.84	SR 609 (Country Ridge Road)	Fawndale Road	SR 608 (Fork Mountain Road)	
Frederick	1.62	2.61	SR 277 (Fairfax Pike)	Warrior Drive Landfill Road	SR 1036 (Craig Drive)	
Halifax	3.70	5.95	SR 344	Allens Mill Road	SR 716 (Dryburg Road)	
Hanover	0.35	0.56	US 1 (Washington Highway)	Old Keeton Road	SR 661 (Old Telegraph Road)	
Henry	0.50	0.80	SR 674 (Trent Hill Drive)	Lake View Lane	Dead End	
James City	0.06	0.10	SR 706 (Winston Drive)	Hurst Street	SR 706 (Winston Drive)	
Loudoun	18.04	29.03	Fauquier County line	Greengarden Road Airmont Road New Cut Road Main Street Woodgrove Road Stony Point Road	SR 9 (Charles Town Pike)	
Louisa	1.39	2.24	US 522 (Zachary Taylor Highway)	Days Bridge Road	Spotsylvania County line	
Mecklenburg	1.43	2.30	North Carolina state line	Rock Church Road	SR 825 (Ivy Hill Road)	
Montgomery	1.83	2.95	SR 720 (Spaulding Road)	Switchback Road	SR 659 (Vickers Switch Road)	
Pittsylvania	9.63	15.50	SR 360 (Old Richmond Road)	Green Farm Road Lawless Creek Road Witt Road Mount Hermon Road Golf Club Road	SR 863 (Robertson Lane/Golf Club Road)	Gap between segments ending at different points along SR 745 Gap between segments ending at different points along SR 41
Prince George	0.23	0.37	SR 618 (Queen Street)	Stech Drive	SR 625 (Hines Road)	
Prince William	0.50	0.80	SR 234/Manassas city limits	Rolling Road	SR 1591 (Highland Street)	
Pulaski	0.56	0.90	Dead End	Unnamed road	SR 710 (Mount Olivet Road)	
Roanoke	0.25	0.40	Dead End	Saul Lane	SR 617 (Pitzer Road)	
Rockbridge	1.30	2.09	SR 717	Unnamed road	SR 613 (Ridge Road)	
Rockingham	2.25	3.62	SR 925 (Kezzletown Road)	Layman Trestle Road	SR 718 (Old Furnace Road)	
Scott	1.00	1.61	SR 696	Homer Lane	Dead End	
Shenandoah	0.16	0.26	US 11 (Congress Street)	Dixie Lane	Dead End	
Spotsylvania	5.84	9.40	Orange County line	Days Bridge Road	Louisa County line	
Stafford	0.40	0.64	Dead End	William and Mary Lane	SR 635 (Decatur Road)	
Tazewell	1.17	1.88	US 19	Claypool Hill Mall Road	US 460/SR 1234	
Washington	2.11	3.40	SR 708 (Rhea Valley Road)	McCann Road	SR 788 (Cornett Road)	
Wise	0.20	0.32	Dead End	Hamilton Street	SR 72	
York	0.13	0.21	SR 720 (Wilkins Drive)	Westover Drive	SR 722	
