= Virginia State Route 723 =

Secondary route designation

State Route 723

Route information
- Maintained by VDOT

Location
- Country: United States
- State: Virginia

Highway system
- Virginia Routes; Interstate; US; Primary; Secondary; Byways; History; HOT lanes

State Route 723 (SR 723) in the U.S. state of Virginia is a secondary route designation applied to multiple discontinuous road segments among the many counties. The list below describes the sections in each county that are designated SR 723.

== List ==
County	Length (mi)	Length (km)	From	Via	To	Notes
Accomack	0.18	0.29	SR 679 (Metompkin Road)	Seaside Park Road	Dead End	
Albemarle	5.55	8.93	SR 6 (Irish Road)	Sharon Road Chestnut Grove Road	SR 626 (James River Road)	
Amherst	2.20	3.54	SR 629 (Little Piney Road)	Dillard Hill Road	SR 630 (Crawleys Creek Road)	
Augusta	1.20	1.93	SR 720 (Dry Branch Road)	Whiskey Creek Road	SR 725 (Whiskey Creek Road/Chapel Road)	
Bedford	4.49	7.23	SR 860 (Bunker Hill Loop)	McDaniel Road Skinnell Mill Road	SR 714 (Falling Creek Road)	Gap between segments ending at different points along SR 43
Botetourt	0.50	0.80	Dead End	Brickyard Road	SR 738 (Webster Road)	
Campbell	0.60	0.97	Dead End	Viewmont Drive	US 29 (Wards Road)	
Carroll	1.20	1.93	SR 712 (Mallory Road)	Trapper Drive	SR 722 (Cranberry Road)	
Chesterfield	0.68	1.09	SR 725 (Quinnford Boulevard)	Periwinkle Drive	Unspecified location	
Dinwiddie	0.58	0.93	SR 611 (Wilkinson Road)	Pearson Hardy Road	Dead End	
Fairfax	1.56	2.51	SR 633 (Kings Highway)	Harrison Lane Lockheed Boulevard	US 1 (Richmond Highway)	
Fauquier	0.60	0.97	SR 731 (Cobbler Mountain Road/Ashville Road)	Ashville Road	FR-185 (Grove Lane)	
Franklin	1.82	2.93	SR 619 (Fanny Cook Road)	Lucy Wade Road	SR 803 (Edgewood Road)	
Frederick	1.72	2.77	Clarke County line	Carpers Valley Road	US 50 (Millwood Pike)	
Halifax	1.50	2.41	Dead End	Brad Smith Trail	SR 603 (Hunting Creek Road)	
Hanover	1.10	1.77	SR 634 (Beatties Mill Road)	Peppertown Road	Dead End	
Henry	1.24	2.00	SR 698 (Crestridge Road)	Mockingbird Lane	Dead End	
James City	0.30	0.48	Dead End	Old Church Road	US 60 (Richmond Road)	
Loudoun	1.25	2.01	SR 725 (Hughesville Road)	Foundry Road	SR 722 (Lincoln Road)	
Louisa	0.77	1.24	SR 652 (Kentucky Springs Road)	Bohannon Road	Dead End	
Mecklenburg	6.15	9.90	North Carolina state line	Shiney Rock Road	US 15 (College Street)	
Montgomery	7.67	12.34	Christiansburg town limits	Ellett Road Jenelle Road Lusters Gate Road	SR 785 (Harding Road/Catawba Road)	
Pittsylvania	1.35	2.17	SR 729 (Kentuck Road)	Old Quarry Road	SR 360 (Old Richmond Road)	
Prince George	0.16	0.26	SR 646 (Middle Road)	Norcum Avenue	SR 156 (Prince George Drive)	
Prince William	0.68	1.09	SR 1108 (Old Triangle Road)	Woodland Drive	SR 1107 (Graham Park Road)	
Pulaski	0.15	0.24	Dead End	Lee Avenue	SR 695 (Old Peppers Ferry Loop)	
Roanoke	0.20	0.32	Dead End	Hogan Road	SR 618 (Highland Road)	
Rockbridge	0.40	0.64	SR 710	Link Way Lane	SR 717 (Sterrett Road)	
Rockingham	0.30	0.48	SR 722 (Armentrout Path)	0.30	Dead End	
Scott	1.80	2.90	SR 72	Flatwoods Road	SR 755	
Shenandoah	2.20	3.54	SR 726 (Flat Rock Road)	Happy Valley Road	SR 263 (Orkney Grade)	
Spotsylvania	0.92	1.48	Dead End	Dovey Road	SR 612 (Stubbs Bridge Road)	
Stafford	0.60	0.97	Dead End	Jacobs Lane	US 17 (Warrenton Road)	
Tazewell	0.46	0.74	Dead End	Kirby Road	SR 67 (Raven Road)	Gap between segments ending at different points along SR 724
Washington	0.81	1.30	SR 91	McCready Road	Dead End	
Wise	2.00	3.22	SR 646 (Coeburn Mountain Road)	Unnamed road	Dead End	
York	0.17	0.27	SR 641 (Penniman Road)	Fillmore Drive	SR 722 (Duncan Drive)	
