= Virginia State Route 720 =

Secondary route designation

State Route 720

Route information
- Maintained by VDOT

Location
- Country: United States
- State: Virginia

Highway system
- Virginia Routes; Interstate; US; Primary; Secondary; Byways; History; HOT lanes

State Route 720 (SR 720) in the U.S. state of Virginia is a secondary route designation applied to multiple discontinuous road segments among the many counties. The list below describes the sections in each county that are designated SR 720.

== List ==
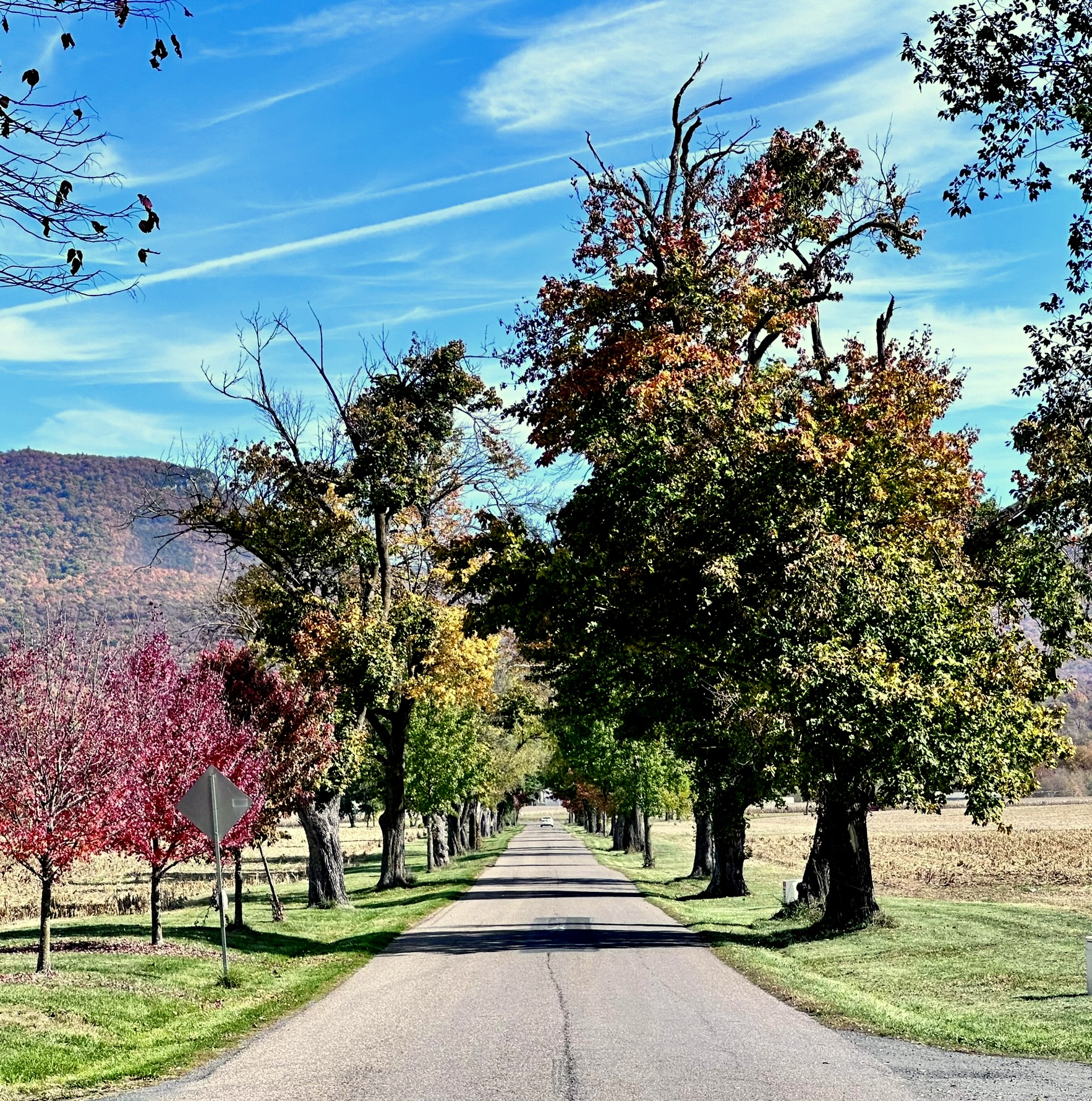
Facing east down Virginia State Route 720 between the Meems Bottom Covered Bridge and U.S. Route 11 in Shenandoah County

County	Length (mi)	Length (km)	From	Via	To	Notes
Accomack	1.00	1.61	SR 709 (Horntown Road)	Kelly Road	SR 712 (Sign Post Road)	
Albemarle	0.63	1.01	Dead End	Harris Creek Road	SR 20 (Scottsville Road)	
Alleghany	0.04	0.06	SR 692 (Stratton Street)	Miller Street	Dead End	
Amherst	0.50	0.80	SR 636	Burford Farm Road	Dead End	
Augusta	12.27	19.75	US 250 (Hankey Mountain Highway)	Jerusalem Chapel Road Dry Branch Road Morris Mill Road	Staunton city limits	
Bedford	0.60	0.97	SR 634 (Hardy Road)	Old Station Loop	SR 634 (Hardy Road)	
Botetourt	0.30	0.48	US 220 (Roanoke Road)	Amsterdam Road	Dead End	
Campbell	0.70	1.13	Dead End	Golf Course Road	SR 601 (Juniper Cliff Road)	
Carroll	1.60	2.57	Grayson County line	Marthas Knob Road	SR 815 (Dickey Drive)	
Chesterfield	3.83	6.16	SR 754 (Coalfield Road)	Miners Trail Lucks Lane	SR 653 (Courthouse Road)	Gap between a dead end and SR 288
Dinwiddie	0.15	0.24	SR 601 (River Road)	Chestnut Drive	Dead End	
Fairfax	0.10	0.16	Dead End	Woods Court	SR 660 (Fairfax Station Road)	
Fauquier	0.83	1.34	Dead End	Mountjoy Road	SR 721 (State Road)	
Franklin	2.19	3.52	SR 721 (Patti Road)	English Road	SR 674 (Doe Run Road)	
Halifax	7.56	12.17	SR 344/SR 724	Green Level Road Guill Town Road	US 360/SR 92	
Hanover	1.25	2.01	SR 684 (Verdon Road)	North Telegraph Road	Dead End	
Henry	1.51	2.43	SR 655 (Green Hill Drive)	Mountain Mist Road	SR 57 (Chatham Road)	
James City	0.19	0.31	SR 666 (Cooley Road)	Richards Road	SR 687 (Leon Drive)	
Loudoun	1.50	2.41	SR 719 (Woodgrove Road)	Bell Road	SR 7 Bus (Loudoun Street)	
Louisa	3.05	4.91	US 522 (Zachary Taylor Highway)	Hensley Road	Cul-de-Sac	
Mecklenburg	0.20	0.32	SR 785 (Jonbil Road)	Duckworth Drive	SR 49	
Montgomery	3.65	5.87	SR 663 (Walton Drive)	Spaulding Road Barringer Mountain Road	US 11 (Radford Road)	
Pittsylvania	0.46	0.74	SR 745 (Mount View Road)	Blairs Circle	US 29 Bus	
Prince George	0.40	0.64	US 301 (Crater Road)	Moreel Avenue	Dead End	
Prince William	0.48	0.77	SR 234 (Dumfries Road)	Old Dominion Drive	SR 702 (Grant Avenue)	
Pulaski	0.55	0.89	SR 738 (Robinson Tract Road)	Hilton Village Loop	SR 738 (Robinson Tract Road)	
Roanoke	1.88	3.03	SR 687 (Penn Forest Boulevard)	Colonial Avenue	Roanoke city limits	
Rockbridge	0.50	0.80	SR 604 (Gibbs Run Lane)	Spring Run Lane	Dead End	
Rockingham	2.55	4.10	SR 753 (Kratzer Road)	Irish Path Shirttail Alley Daniel Smith Lane Smithland Road	Harrisonburg city limits	Gap between dead ends
Scott	0.50	0.80	Tennessee state line	Unnamed road	SR 625	
Shenandoah	17.84	28.71	West Virginia state line	Crooked Run Road Wissler Road	US 11 (Old Valley Pike)	Gap between segments ending at different points along SR 721 Gap between segments ending at different points along SR 263
Spotsylvania	0.25	0.40	Dead End	Confederate Cemetery Drive	SR 208 (Courthouse Road)	
Stafford	0.66	1.06	SR 642 (Barrett Heights Road)	Fritters Lane	Cul-de-Sac	
Tazewell	1.56	2.51	US 19	Heckman Pike	Bluefield town limits	
Washington	2.40	3.86	SR 722 (Blue Springs Road)	Morrison Road	SR 721 (Limestone Road)	
Wise	0.35	0.56	SR 699	Unnamed road	Dead End	
York	0.65	1.05	SR 723 (Fillmore Drive)	Wilkins Drive	Cul-de-Sac	
