= Virginia State Route 724 =

Secondary route designation

State Route 724

Route information
- Maintained by VDOT

Location
- Country: United States
- State: Virginia

Highway system
- Virginia Routes; Interstate; US; Primary; Secondary; Byways; History; HOT lanes

State Route 724 (SR 724) in the U.S. state of Virginia is a secondary route designation applied to multiple discontinuous road segments among the many counties. The list below describes the sections in each county that are designated SR 724.

== List ==
County	Length (mi)	Length (km)	From	Via	To	Notes
Accomack	0.45	0.72	Dead End	Island Neck Road	SR 178 (Boston Road)	
Albemarle	1.70	2.74	Dead End	Lewiston Ford Lane	SR 602 (Howardsville Turnpike)	
Amherst	0.18	0.29	SR 130 (Elon Road)	Williams Store Road	SR 647 (Minors Branch Road)	
Augusta	0.60	0.97	SR 720 (Jeruselem Chapel Road)	Heizer's Tanyard Road	SR 723 (Whiskey Creek Road)	
Bedford	2.10	3.38	SR 722 (Five Forks Road)/SR 723 (McDaniel Road)	Holland Forks Road	SR 43 (Virginia Byway)	
Botetourt	0.80	1.29	SR 639 (Wheatland Road)	Goad Road	Dead End	
Campbell	0.11	0.18	SR 699 (Gladys Road)	Bandy Road	SR 761 (Long Island Road)	
Carroll	1.18	1.90	SR 97 (Pipers Gap Road)	Mallory Road	SR 683 (Poplar Knob Road)	
Chesterfield	1.41	2.27	SR 904 (Point De Rock Road)	Spruce Avenue	Dead End	
Dinwiddie	0.58	0.93	SR 639 (Springston Road/Wilson Road)	Springston Road	US 460	
Fairfax	0.80	1.29	Vienna town limits	Creek Crossing Road	SR 677 (Courthouse Road)	
Fauquier	13.82	22.24	SR 721 (Free State Road)	Ada Road Moreland Road Carrington Road Sage Road Pleasant Vale Road	Dead End	Gap between segments ending at different points along SR 732 Gap between segments ending at different points along SR 55
Franklin	6.26	10.07	SR 718 (Crooked Oak Road)	Goose Dam Road	SR 619 (Fanny Cook Road)	
Frederick	0.20	0.32	US 522 (Frederick Pike)	Ashton Drive	Dead End	
Halifax	2.22	3.57	SR 344 (Scottsburg Road)	Drybridge Road	SR 344/SR 720	
Hanover	2.11	3.40	SR 651 (Georgetown Road)	Fire Lane	Dead End	
Henry	0.44	0.71	US 220 Bus	Fontaine Drive	Dead End	
James City	0.20	0.32	SR 709 (Chestnut Drive)	Dogwood Drive	SR 617 (Lake Powell Road)	
Loudoun	0.11	0.18	Dead End	Hertz Road	SR 729 (Shelburne Glebe Road)	
Louisa	1.00	1.61	SR 640 (Jack Jouett Road)	Harlow Town Road	Dead End	
Mecklenburg	1.80	2.90	SR 723 (Shiney Rock Road)	Lewis Mill Road	Dead End	
Montgomery	1.60	2.57	SR 666 (Mud Pike)	Gate Road	SR 604 (Plum Creek Road)	
Pittsylvania	1.31	2.11	SR 750 (Mount Cross Road)	Mill Creek Road	Danville city limits	
Prince George	0.17	0.27	SR 106/SR 616	Courts Drive	SR 709/SR 712	
Prince William	0.16	0.26	SR 234 (Dumfries Road)	Hamowell Street	Dead End	
Pulaski	0.04	0.06	Dead End	Riverlawn Court	SR 622 (Dudley Ferry Road)	
Roanoke	0.38	0.61	SR 1010 (Maplewood Drive)	Parkview Circle	SR 673	
Rockbridge	9.42	15.16	Dead End	Unnamed road Hays Creek Road Sterrett Road Unnamed road	SR 613 (Ridge Road)	Gap between segments ending at different points along SR 602 Gap between segments ending at different points along SR 252 Gap between segments ending at different points along SR 717
Rockingham	7.00	11.27	SR 725 (Etna Road)	Melrose Road Trinity Church Road Flook Lane Pack Saddle Road	Dead End	Gap between segments ending at different points along SR 717 Gap between segments ending at different points along SR 620
Scott	0.55	0.89	SR 71	Crabapple Road	SR 612	
Shenandoah	0.98	1.58	Dead End	Tussing Lane	SR 725 (Morning Star Road)	
Spotsylvania	0.50	0.80	Dead End	Wigglesworth Road	SR 658 (Mount Olive Road)	
Stafford	0.95	1.53	Dead End	Clark Patton Road	US 17 (Warrenton Road)	
Tazewell	0.65	1.05	SR 9635 (Reven Elementary School)	Bottom Road	SR 723 (Kirby Road)	
Washington	3.45	5.55	SR 605 (Widener Valley Road)	Beech Grove Road	SR 91	
Wise	0.55	0.89	Dead End	Unnamed road	SR 738	
York	0.47	0.76	SR 723 (Fillmore Drive)	Stewart Drive	SR 642 (Queens Creek Road)	
