= Virginia State Route 688 =

State highway in Virginia, United States

State Route 688

Route information
- Maintained by VDOT

Location
- Country: United States
- State: Virginia

Highway system
- Virginia Routes; Interstate; US; Primary; Secondary; Byways; History; HOT lanes

State Route 688 (SR 688) in the U.S. state of Virginia is a secondary route designation applied to multiple discontinuous road segments among the many counties. The list below describes the sections in each county that are designated SR 688.

== List ==
| County | Length (mi) | Length (km) | From | Via | To | Notes |
|---|---|---|---|---|---|---|
| Accomack | 7.20 | 11.59 | SR 187 (Nelsonia Road) | Fletcher Road Gladding Road Cattail Road | SR 690 (Whites Crossing Road) | Gap between segments ending at different points along SR 687 Gap between segments ending at different points along SR 658 |
| Albemarle | 1.86 | 2.99 | SR 689 (Burches Creek Road) | Midway Road | SR 635 (Miller School Road) | |
| Alleghany | 0.11 | 0.18 | Dead End | Stoughton Lane | US 60 (Midland Trail) | |
| Amelia | 0.60 | 0.97 | SR 616 (Genito Road) | Shady Lane | Dead End | |
| Amherst | 0.90 | 1.45 | SR 635 (Buffalo Springs Turnpike) | Cinquapin Road | Dead End | |
| Appomattox | 0.10 | 0.16 | SR 608 (Stonewall Road) | Karl Road | Dead End | |
| Augusta | 8.70 | 14.00 | Dead End | Hodges Draft Lane Old Parkersburg Turnpike | SR 42 (Parkersburg Turnpike/Little Calf Pasture Highway) | Gap between segments ending at different points along SR 629 |
| Bath | 0.39 | 0.63 | SR 39 (Mountain Valley Road) | Wild Cat School Road | SR 39 (Mountain Valley Road) | |
| Bedford | 2.60 | 4.18 | SR 689 (Irving Road) | Buffalo Run Road | SR 684 (Penicks Mill Road) | |
| Botetourt | 5.41 | 8.71 | SR 43 (Narrow Passage Road) | Salt Petre Cave Road Church Street | SR 43 (Branch Road) | |
| Brunswick | 1.50 | 2.41 | SR 634 (Reedy Creek Road) | Deerfield Road | Dead End | |
| Buchanan | 0.41 | 0.66 | Dead End | Yates Street | Dead End | |
| Buckingham | 0.10 | 0.16 | US 15 (James Madison Highway) | New Canton Road | SR 670 (CG Woodson Road) | |
| Campbell | 1.18 | 1.90 | SR 689 (Moorman Mill Road) | Patterson Road | US 29 (Wards Road) | |
| Caroline | 0.20 | 0.32 | Dead End | Miller Lane | SR 632 (Cedon Road) | |
| Carroll | 7.72 | 12.42 | US 52 (Fancy Gap Highway) | Firehouse Road Meadow Brook Road Little Bear Trail Wisler Road Firehouse Road | SR 800 (Peakview Road) | |
| Charlotte | 0.97 | 1.56 | Dead End | Blue Stone Road | SR 40 (Church Street/George Washington Highway) | |
| Chesterfield | 0.84 | 1.35 | SR 653 (Courthouse Road) | Dakins Drive | SR 672 (Adkins Road) | |
| Craig | 0.18 | 0.29 | Dead End | Unnamed road | SR 311 (Craig Valley Drive) | |
| Culpeper | 0.93 | 1.50 | Dead End | Countryside Lane | SR 647 (Batna Road) | |
| Cumberland | 1.10 | 1.77 | SR 639 (Putney Road) | Garnett Road | Dead End | |
| Dickenson | 1.25 | 2.01 | Dead End | Sullivan Road | Buchanan County line | |
| Dinwiddie | 2.40 | 3.86 | SR 670 (Shady Lane) | Sawmill Road | SR 667 (Malones Road) | |
| Essex | 0.38 | 0.61 | Dead End | Fortune Lane | SR 637 (Occupacia Road) | |
| Fairfax | 0.37 | 0.60 | Dead End | Potomac School Road | SR 123/SR 193 | |
| Fauquier | 27.32 | 43.97 | SR 802 (Springs Road) | Harts Mill Road Leeds Manor Road | US 17 (Winchester Road) | |
| Floyd | 1.60 | 2.57 | SR 739 (Sam Reed Road) | Music Road | SR 705 (Beaver Creek Road) | |
| Fluvanna | 1.00 | 1.61 | SR 639 (Long Acre Road) | Hidden Valleys Road | Dead End | |
| Franklin | 3.98 | 6.41 | SR 689 (Sample Road) | Peters Pike Road Landmark Road | SR 678 (Farmington Drive/Poteet Road) | Gap between segments ending at different points along SR 116 |
| Frederick | 3.30 | 5.31 | US 50 (Northwestern Pike) | Stony Hill Road | SR 684 (Gainesboro Road) | |
| Giles | 1.04 | 1.67 | SR 623 (Cascade Drive) | Hendrickson Road | Dead End | |
| Gloucester | 0.52 | 0.84 | Dead End | Prospect Road | SR 677 (Hall Town Road) | |
| Goochland | 0.50 | 0.80 | SR 603 (Tabscott Road) | Pink Dogwood Road | Dead End | |
| Grayson | 0.80 | 1.29 | SR 685 (Rock Creek Road/Powerhouse Road) | Silver Hill Road | SR 687 (Powerhouse Road) | |
| Greensville | 0.20 | 0.32 | Dead End | Quarter Road | Emporia city limits | |
| Halifax | 4.98 | 8.01 | Pittsylvania County line | Kerns Mill Road Goodes Road | SR 659 (River Road/Brooklyn Road) | |
| Hanover | 6.04 | 9.72 | SR 738 (Old Ridge Road) | Doswell Road | Dead End | |
| Henry | 9.01 | 14.50 | SR 695 (George Taylor Road) | J S Holland Road Lee Ford Camp Road | US 220/US 220 Bus | Gap between segments ending at different points along SR 692 |
| Isle of Wight | 0.14 | 0.23 | SR 641 (Colosse Road) | Avis Drive | SR 633 (Rhodes Drive) | |
| James City | 0.12 | 0.19 | SR 653 (Duer Drive) | Vaiden Drive | SR 687 (Leon Drive) | |
| King and Queen | 0.15 | 0.24 | SR 691 (Apple Road) | Howard Lane | Dead End | |
| King George | 0.20 | 0.32 | SR 610 (Indiantown Road) | Hickory Lane | Dead End | |
| Lancaster | 1.49 | 2.40 | SR 200 (Irvington Road) | James B Jones Memorial Highway | SR 3 (Main Street) | |
| Lee | 1.30 | 2.09 | SR 690 (Caylor Road) | Dry Branch Road | Dead End | |
| Loudoun | 0.65 | 1.05 | SR 7 Bus (Loudoun Street) | Simmons Road | Dead End | |
| Louisa | 2.94 | 4.73 | US 250 (Three Notch Road) | Holland Creek Road | SR 208 (Courthouse Road) | |
| Lunenburg | 10.02 | 16.13 | SR 630 (Fort Mitchell Drive) | Thompson Road Braxton Road Ward Corner Road Owl Creek Road | SR 687 (Wildwood Road) | Gap between segments ending at different points along SR 623 Gap between segments ending at different points along SR 622 Gap between segments ending at different points along SR 40 |
| Madison | 0.62 | 1.00 | SR 634 (Oak Park Road) | Resettlement Road | Dead End | |
| Mathews | 0.34 | 0.55 | Dead End | Dixon Road | SR 639 (Crab Neck Road) | |
| Mecklenburg | 12.95 | 20.84 | US 58 Bus | Skipwith Road | SR 92 | |
| Middlesex | 0.24 | 0.39 | SR 33/SR 662 | Speck Avenue | Dead End | |
| Montgomery | 0.94 | 1.51 | US 11 (Radford Street) | Rock Road | Radford city limits | |
| Nelson | 0.60 | 0.97 | SR 655 (Variety Mills Road) | Saunders Lane | Dead End | |
| Northampton | 0.80 | 1.29 | SR 618 (Bayside Road) | Hare Valley Drive | US 13 (Lankford Highway) | |
| Northumberland | 0.60 | 0.97 | Lancaster County line | Waddeytown Road | Dead End | |
| Nottoway | 0.17 | 0.27 | SR 724 (Old Plank Road) | Deems Street | Dead End | |
| Orange | 0.30 | 0.48 | SR 647 (Old Gordonsville Road) | Little Zion Road | SR 637 (Tomahawk Creek Road) | |
| Page | 1.10 | 1.77 | SR 638 (Mill Creek Road/Aylor Grubbs Avenue) | Frank Ballard Road | SR 637 (Piney Hill Road) | |
| Patrick | 1.84 | 2.96 | SR 765 (Rhody Creek Loop) | Fire Trail Lane | Dead End | |
| Pittsylvania | 0.04 | 0.06 | SR 656 (Kerns Church Road) | Kerns Mill Road | Halifax County line | |
| Prince Edward | 1.45 | 2.33 | SR 619 (Lockett Road) | High Bridge Road | Dead End | |
| Prince William | 2.20 | 3.54 | SR 234 (Dumfries Road) | Lake Jackson Drive | Manassas city limits | |
| Pulaski | 0.13 | 0.21 | SR 1006 (Locust Street) | Dunlap Avenue | SR 632 (Dunlap Road) | |
| Richmond | 0.20 | 0.32 | Dead End | Lambs Lane | SR 630 (Wellfords Wharf Road) | |
| Roanoke | 2.70 | 4.35 | SR 613 (Merriman Road) | Cotton Hill Road | US 221 (Bent Mountain Road) | |
| Rockbridge | 2.18 | 3.51 | SR 773 (Lloyd Tolley Road) | Stoner Hollow Road | SR 608 (Forge Road) | |
| Rockingham | 1.10 | 1.77 | Dead End | Taylor Spring Lane | SR 687 (Massanetta Springs Road) | |
| Russell | 0.41 | 0.66 | SR 645 (New Garden Road) | Musick Road | Dead End | |
| Scott | 2.27 | 3.65 | SR 613 (Big Moccasin Road) | Fergunson Branch Road | SR 71 (Nicklesville Highway) | |
| Shenandoah | 3.60 | 5.79 | SR 779 (Ridge Hollow Road) | Helsley Road | SR 682 (Readus Road) | Gap between segments ending at different points along SR 42 |
| Smyth | 3.40 | 5.47 | SR 16 | Dry Run Road | SR 622 (Nicks Creek Road) | Gap between segments ending at different points along SR 689 |
| Southampton | 5.04 | 8.11 | US 58 (Southampton Parkway) | New Market Road Rose Valley Road Sycamore Church Road | US 258 (Smith Ferry Road) | Gap between segments ending at different points along SR 684 |
| Spotsylvania | 1.17 | 1.88 | SR 3 (Plank Road) | Single Oak Road | SR 675 (Five Mile Road) | |
| Stafford | 0.40 | 0.64 | SR 630 (Courthouse Road) | Hamn Lane | Dead End | |
| Warren | 0.20 | 0.32 | SR 638 | Unnamed road | Dead End | |
| Washington | 0.45 | 0.72 | SR 689 (Brumley Gap Road) | Scott Ridge Road | Dead End | |
| Westmoreland | 0.60 | 0.97 | SR 203 (Oldhams Road) | Springview Road | Dead End | |
| Wise | 0.56 | 0.90 | US 58 Alt | Unnamed road | SR 706 (Tacoma Mountain Road) | |
| Wythe | 2.50 | 4.02 | SR 100 (Wysor Highway) | Dry Pond Road | Pulaski County line | |
| York | 0.04 | 0.06 | Dead End | Pine Tree Road | SR 722 (Richwine Drive) | |
