= Virginia State Route 721 =

Secondary route designation

State Route 721

Route information
- Maintained by VDOT

Location
- Country: United States
- State: Virginia

Highway system
- Virginia Routes; Interstate; US; Primary; Secondary; Byways; History; HOT lanes

State Route 721 (SR 721) in the U.S. state of Virginia is a secondary route designation applied to multiple discontinuous road segments among the many counties. The list below describes the sections in each county that are designated SR 721.

== List ==
County	Length (mi)	Length (km)	From	Via	To	Notes
Accomack	0.10	0.16	SR 632 (Evergreen Road)	Unnamed road	Dead End	
Albemarle	1.21	1.95	SR 6 (Irish Road)	Old Dominion Road	SR 630 (Green Creek Road)	
Alleghany	1.11	1.79	SR 687 (Jackson River Road)	Unnamed road	SR 687 (Jackson River Road)	Gap between SR 695 and a dead end
Amherst	0.35	0.56	Dead End	Ann Street	US 29 Bus	
Augusta	2.10	3.38	Dead End	Eagle Rock Lane Hundley Mill Road	Dead End	Gap between segments ending at different points along US 250
Bedford	0.80	1.29	SR 122 (Moneta Road)	Wells Road	SR 722 (Five Forks Road)	
Botetourt	0.50	0.80	US 11 (Lee Highway)	Darby Road	US 11 (Lee Highway)	
Campbell	0.40	0.64	SR 646 (Spring Mill Road)	Pilot View Road	Dead End	
Carroll	4.03	6.49	SR 606 (Dixon Road)	Fries Road Cliffview Road	Galax city limits	Gap between segments ending at different points along SR 607
Chesterfield	0.30	0.48	Dead End	Penmar Drive	SR 36 (River Road)	
Dinwiddie	0.60	0.97	US 460/FR-804	Pine Hill Road	Dead End	
Fairfax	0.83	1.34	SR 242 (Gunston Road)	Pohick Bay Drive	Cul-de-Sac	
Fauquier	6.42	10.33	SR 738 (Wilson Road)	Free State Road	I-66/US 17 Bus/SR 55	
Franklin	3.50	5.63	SR 707 (Ashpone Tavern Road)	Patti Road	SR 718 (Colonial Turnpike)	
Frederick	0.17	0.27	US 522 (Maple Street)	Purcell Lane	Dead End	
Halifax	4.16	6.69	US 360 (James D Hagood Highway)	Piney Creek Road Ashe Cake Creek Road	SR 716 (Dryburg Road)	
Hanover	1.21	1.95	SR 620 (Dogwood Trail Road)	Watkins Road	Dead End	
Henry	0.58	0.93	Dead End	DuPont Road	US 58	
James City	0.28	0.45	SR 614 (Centerville Road)	Settlers Lane	Cul-de-Sac	
Loudoun	0.15	0.24	SR 726 (Taylor Road)	Crooked Run Lane	Dead End	
Louisa	0.30	0.48	Dead End	Watkins Lane	SR 688 (Holland Creek Road)	
Mecklenburg	1.50	2.41	Dead End	State Line Road	SR 822 (Old Saudan Road)	
Montgomery	0.42	0.68	Dead End	Mash Run	SR 655 (Long Shop Road/Mount Zion Road)	
Pittsylvania	0.85	1.37	US 29 Bus	Livestock Road	SR 719 (Lawless Creek Road)	
Prince George	0.42	0.68	SR 630 (Jefferson Park Road)	Mica Drive	Dead End	
Prince William	0.27	0.43	US 1 (Jefferson Davis Highway)	Anderson Road	SR 722 (Meyers Road)	
Pulaski	0.60	0.97	SR 693 (Julia Simpson Road)	Webb Road	Dead End	
Roanoke	0.70	1.13	SR 666 (Bandy Road)	Ferguson Valley Road	Dead End	
Rockbridge	0.90	1.45	SR 717	Finley Road	SR 606 (Raphine Road)	
Rockingham	9.49	15.27	SR 613 (Turleytown Road/Singers Glen Road)	Green Hill Road Linville Edom Road Longs Pump Road Fellowship Road	SR 717 (Indian Trail Road)	Gap between segments ending at different points along SR 42 Gap between segments ending at different points along SR 753 Gap between segments ending at different points along US 11
Scott	1.40	2.25	SR 694	Indian Creek Lane	Dead End	
Shenandoah	4.10	6.60	SR 263 (Orkney Grade)	Kelly Road	SR 711 (Bauserman Road)	
Spotsylvania	4.01	6.45	SR 601 (Lawyers Road)	Grand Brooks Road	SR 612 (Stubbs Bridge Road)	
Stafford	1.12	1.80	SR 687 (Hope Road)	Old Concord Road	Dead End	
Tazewell	0.90	1.45	Dead End	Teri Road	SR 643 (Mud Fork Road)	
Washington	2.72	4.38	SR 91	Limestone Road	Dead End	Gap between segments ending at different points along SR 722
Wise	0.75	1.21	US 23 Bus	Highland Drive	Dead End	
York	0.07	0.11	SR 720 (Wilkins Drive)	Berkley Drive	SR 722 (Duncan Drive)	
