= Virginia State Route 687 =

State highway in Virginia, United States

State Route 687

Route information
- Maintained by VDOT

Location
- Country: United States
- State: Virginia

Highway system
- Virginia Routes; Interstate; US; Primary; Secondary; Byways; History; HOT lanes

State Route 687 (SR 687) in the U.S. state of Virginia is a secondary route designation applied to multiple discontinuous road segments among the many counties. The list below describes the sections in each county that are designated SR 687.

== List ==
County	Length (mi)	Length (km)	From	Via	To	Notes
Accomack	4.02	6.47	SR 187 (Shoremain Drive)	Bethel Church Road	SR 692 (Main Street)	
Albemarle	2.40	3.86	SR 810 (Black Hollow Road)	Shifflett Mill Road	SR 601 (Free Union Road)	
Alleghany	11.34	18.25	US 220	Jackson River Road	Bath County line	Former SR 268
Amelia	1.80	2.90	SR 656 (Amelia Avenue)	Harrison Road	SR 639 (Mount Zion Road)	
Amherst	0.80	1.29	Dead End	Scotts Branch Road	SR 621 (Indian Creek Road)	
Appomattox	0.89	1.43	SR 656 (Horseshoe Road)	Patteson School Road	Dead End	
Augusta	7.36	11.84	SR 600 (Marble Valley Road)	Ramsey Gap Road Railroad Avenue	SR 42 (Little Calf Pasture Highway)	Gap between segments ending at different points along SR 42
Bath	11.43	18.39	Alleghany County line	Jackson River Turnpike	SR 39 (Mountain Valley Road)	Formerly SR 268
Bedford	2.28	3.67	SR 680 (Sheep Creek Road)	Owl Town Road	SR 614 (Sheep Creek Road)	
Botetourt	2.06	3.32	SR 726 (Lapsley Run Road)	Elburnell Drive	SR 662 (Full House Road)	
Brunswick	3.50	5.63	SR 606 (Belfield Road)	Old Church Road Glendale Mill Road	SR 606 (Belfield Road)	
Buchanan	0.03	0.05	SR 688 (Russell Hill Road)	Yates Street	US 460	
Buckingham	0.30	0.48	SR 670 (CG Woodson Road)	Boat Landing Road	Dead End	
Campbell	3.10	4.99	SR 686 (Browns Mill Road)	Gough Road	SR 24 (Colonial Highway)	
Caroline	0.20	0.32	SR 722 (Nelson Hill Road)	First Street	Dead End	
Carroll	2.06	3.32	SR 686 (Epworth Road)	Fish Lake Road	SR 679 (Wards Gap Road)	
Charlotte	1.20	1.93	Dead End	Mount Mitchell Road	Dead End	
Chesterfield	0.88	1.42	SR 3419 (Carriage Pines Drive)	Starview Lane	Dead End	
Craig	0.52	0.84	Dead End	Draft Road	SR 685	
Culpeper	0.17	0.27	SR 762 (Brandy Road)	Church Road	Dead End	
Cumberland	2.20	3.54	Dead End	Sherwood Road	SR 616 (Deep Run Road)	
Dickenson	0.10	0.16	SR 600	Unnamed road	Dead End	
Dinwiddie	4.32	6.95	SR 609 (Cherryhill Road)	Cutbank Road	SR 40 (McKenney Highway)	
Essex	0.45	0.72	Dead End	The Level Road	SR 629 (Battery Road)	
Fairfax	1.61	2.59	SR 3212 (Delf Drive)	Churchill Road Old Chain Bridge Road	SR 3547 (Chain Bridge Road)	
Fauquier	4.50	7.24	SR 802 (Springs Road)	Opal Road	US 15/US 17	
Floyd	0.20	0.32	SR 739 (Reed Hill Road)	Pugh Road	Dead End	
Fluvanna	0.16	0.26	SR 646 (Hardware Road)	Radicel Circle	SR 646 (Hardware Road)	
Franklin	6.08	9.78	SR 698 (Kin Vale Road)	Alean Road	SR 684 (Boones Mill Road)	
Frederick	0.65	1.05	SR 600 (Siler Road)	Chalybeate Springs Road	Dead End	
Giles	0.04	0.06	Narrows town limits	Wolf Street	Dead End	
Gloucester	0.20	0.32	US 17 (George Washington Memorial Highway)/SR 33	Dragon Drive	Dead End	
Goochland	2.50	4.02	SR 6 (River Road)	Danieltown Road	SR 608 (Davis Mill Road)	
Grayson	3.20	5.15	SR 685/SR 686	Powerhouse Road	SR 691 (Fulton Road)	
Greensville	0.33	0.53	SR 611/SR 643	Mill Road Unnamed road	Dead End	
Halifax	0.16	0.26	SR 708 (Cedar Grove Road)	Fire Tower Trail	Dead End	
Hanover	1.40	2.25	SR 54 (Patrick Henry Road)	Yankeetown Road	Dead End	
Henry	19.26	31.00	SR 57/SR 831 (Fairmont Drive)	Stones Dairy Road Preston Road Soapstone Road	US 220/FR-845	
Isle of Wight	0.80	1.29	SR 611 (Joyners Bridge Road)	Parsons Drive	SR 610 (Buckthorn Drive)	
James City	0.45	0.72	SR 722	Leon Drive	SR 653 (Duer Drive)	
King and Queen	0.26	0.42	Dead End	Simpson Creek Road	SR 661 (Brookshire Road)	
King George	1.66	2.67	SR 624 (Mathias Point Road)	Woodstock Road	Dead End	
Lancaster	0.70	1.13	Dead End	Wilson Lane	SR 200 (Irvington Road)	
Lee	2.42	3.89	Tennessee state line	Frog Level Road	US 58 Bus	
Loudoun	2.40	3.86	SR 9 (Charles Town Pike)	Sagle Road	SR 671 (Harpers Ferry Road)	
Louisa	1.80	2.90	SR 613 (Goldmine Road)	Daniel Road	US 522 (Zachary Taylor Highway)	
Lunenburg	4.20	6.76	SR 40 (Lunenburg County Road)	Wildwood Road	SR 685 (Germantown Road)	Gap between segments ending at different points along SR 628
Madison	1.95	3.14	SR 230 (Orange Road)	Fairgrounds Road	US 29 Bus (Main Street)	
Mathews	0.64	1.03	Dead End	Careys Lane Providence Road	Dead End	
Mecklenburg	1.99	3.20	SR 696 (Brankley Road)	Country Way	SR 609 (Trottinridge Road)	
Middlesex	0.50	0.80	US 17 (Tidewater Trail)	Reed Drive	Dead End	
Montgomery	1.30	2.09	SR 637 (Alleghany Springs Road)	Hickman Hollow Road	Dead End	
Nelson	7.80	12.55	SR 686 (Zink Mill School Road)	North Fork Road	SR 56 (Crabtree Falls Highway)	
Northampton	0.38	0.61	SR 178 (Belle Haven Road)	Tower Way	US 13/US 13 Bus	
Northumberland	0.35	0.56	SR 649 (Lighthouse View Drive)	Devils Wood Yard Road	SR 772 (Devils Wood Yard Road)	
Orange	1.90	3.06	Spotsylvania County line	Shirley Road	SR 651 (Tatum Road)	
Page	0.45	0.72	SR 611 (Edgewood Drive)	Fox Hollow Road	Dead End	
Patrick	14.71	23.67	SR 765 (Rhody Creek Loop)	Tudor Orchard Road Bull Mountain Road Pleasant View Drive Egg Farm Road Microfilm Road	SR 57 (Fairystone Park Highway)	
Pittsylvania	2.10	3.38	SR 689 (Strader Road)	Brandon Road	SR 903 (Galveston Road)	
Prince Edward	0.12	0.19	Dead End	Ferguson Road	SR 626 (Peaks Road)	
Prince William	0.70	1.13	Dead End	Dawson Beach Road	US 1	
Pulaski	0.32	0.51	SR 606 (Parrott Mountain Road)	Church Hill Lane	Dead End	
Rappahannock	0.46	0.74	SR 637 (South Poes Road)	Four Springs Lane	Cul-de-Sac	
Richmond	0.12	0.19	Dead End	Old Treasure Road	SR 3 (History Land Highway)	
Roanoke	1.60	2.57	US 221 (Brambleton Road)	Colonial Avenue Penn Forest Boulevard	SR 904 (Starkey Road)	
Rockbridge	2.28	3.67	SR 674 (Union Run Road)	Ross Road	Lexington city limits	
Rockingham	2.29	3.69	Cul-de-Sac	Masanetta Springs Road	US 33 (Spotswood Trail)	
Russell	0.73	1.17	Dead End	Roanoke Hill Road	SR 627 (Sawmill Hollow Road)	
Scott	1.30	2.09	SR 613 (Big Moccasin Road)	Gate Drive	SR 71 (Nicklesville Highway)	
Shenandoah	1.20	1.93	SR 686 (Ox Road)	Lantz Road	SR 710	
Smyth	1.20	1.93	SR 610 (Old Rich Valley Road)	Old Chatham Hollow Road	SR 624 (Milldam Road)	
Southampton	11.26	18.12	Dead End	Forks of the River Road Delaware Road	SR 641 (Sedley Road)	Gap between segments ending at different points along SR 684
Spotsylvania	1.20	1.93	SR 653 (Orange Springs Road)	Shirley Road	Orange County line	
Stafford	3.23	5.20	US 1/SR 631	Hope Road	Dead End	
Sussex	0.20	0.32	Dead End	Parham Road	SR 630 (Little Mill Road)	
Tazewell	2.80	4.51	US 460	Fork Ridge Road	Buchanan County line	
Warren	0.27	0.43	Cul-de-Sac	Unnamed road	SR 638 (Howellsville Road)	
Washington	0.92	1.48	SR 611 (North Fork River Road)	Trout Road	SR 689 (Brumbley Gap Road)	
Westmoreland	0.20	0.32	Dead End	Old Post Office Lane	SR 612 (Coles Point Road)	
Wise	0.51	0.82	Dead End	Unnamed road	Dead End	
Wythe	0.32	0.51	SR 94 (Ivanhoe Road)	Delby Terrace	SR 94 (Ivanhoe Road)	
York	0.32	0.51	SR 641 (Penniman Road)	Springfield Road	Dead End	
