= List of secondary state highways in Virginia =

- Primary and secondary State Route shields

Highway names
- Interstates: Interstate X (I-X)
- US Highways: U.S. Route X (US X)
- State: State Route X (SR X) or Virginia Route X (VA X)

System links
- Virginia Routes; Interstate; US; Primary; Secondary; Byways; History; HOT lanes

This is a partial list of secondary state highways in the U.S. state of Virginia. The numbers begin with 600 and can go into five digits in populous counties such as Fairfax County. The same number can be, and usually is, assigned to secondary roads in multiple counties. Because of the sheer number of secondary routes, this list is not intended to be a complete list.

For information about the creation and history of Virginia's Secondary Roads System, see article Byrd Road Act.

== Secondary highways ==
=== SR 600 to SR 699 ===
- SR 600
- SR 601
- SR 602
- SR 603
- SR 604
- SR 605
- SR 606
- SR 607
- SR 608
- SR 609
- SR 610
- SR 611
- SR 612
- SR 613
- SR 614
- SR 615
- SR 616
- SR 617
- SR 618
- SR 619
- SR 620
- SR 621
- SR 622
- SR 623
- SR 624
- SR 625
- SR 626
- SR 627
- SR 628
- SR 629
- SR 630
- SR 631
- SR 632
- SR 633
- SR 634
- SR 635
- SR 636
- SR 637
- SR 638
- SR 639
- SR 640
- SR 641
- SR 642
- SR 643
- SR 644
- SR 645
- SR 646
- SR 647
- SR 648
- SR 649
- SR 650
- SR 651
- SR 652
- SR 653
- SR 654
- SR 655
- SR 656
- SR 657
- SR 658
- SR 659
- SR 660
- SR 661
- SR 662
- SR 663
- SR 664
- SR 665
- SR 666
- SR 667
- SR 668
- SR 669
- SR 670
- SR 671
- SR 672
- SR 673
- SR 674
- SR 675
- SR 676
- SR 677
- SR 678
- SR 679
- SR 680
- SR 681
- SR 682
- SR 683
- SR 684
- SR 685
- SR 686
- SR 687
- SR 688
- SR 689
- SR 690
- SR 691
- SR 692
- SR 693
- SR 694
- SR 695
- SR 696
- SR 697
- SR 698
- SR 699

=== SR 700 to SR 799 ===
- SR 700
- SR 701
- SR 702
- SR 703
- SR 704
- SR 705
- SR 706
- SR 707
- SR 708
- SR 709
- SR 710
- SR 711
- SR 712
- SR 713
- SR 714
- SR 715
- SR 716
- SR 717
- SR 718
- SR 719
- SR 720
- SR 721
- SR 722
- SR 723
- SR 724
- SR 725
- SR 726
- SR 727
- SR 728
- SR 729
- SR 730
- SR 731
- SR 732
- SR 733
- SR 734
- SR 735
- SR 736
- SR 737
- SR 738
- SR 739
- SR 740
- SR 741
- SR 742
- SR 743
- SR 744
- SR 745
- SR 746
- SR 747
- SR 748
- SR 749
- SR 750
- SR 751
- SR 752
- SR 753
- SR 754
- SR 755
- SR 756
- SR 757
- SR 758
- SR 759
- SR 760
- SR 761
- SR 762
- SR 763
- SR 764
- SR 765
- SR 766
- SR 767
- SR 768
- SR 769
- SR 770
- SR 771
- SR 772
- SR 773
- SR 774
- SR 775
- SR 776
- SR 777
- SR 778
- SR 779
- SR 780
- SR 781
- SR 782
- SR 783
- SR 784
- SR 785
- SR 786
- SR 787
- SR 788
- SR 789
- SR 790
- SR 791
- SR 792
- SR 793
- SR 794
- SR 795
- SR 796
- SR 797
- SR 798
- SR 799

=== SR 800 to SR 5999 ===
- SR 803
- SR 805
- SR 846
- SR 5000

== Additional routes ==
=== SR 703 (Northampton County) ===
State Route 703 in Northampton County is a secondary state highway. Also known as Butler's Bluff Drive, it begins at Kiptopeke Drive (State Route 704) and loops around to Arlington Road.

=== SR 704 (Northampton County) ===
State Route 704 in Northampton County is a secondary state highway. Also known as Kiptopeke Drive, it begins at the Lankford Highway in Kiptopeke and continues into Kiptopeke State Park.

=== SR 711 (Chesterfield and Powhatan Counties) ===
State Route 711 in Chesterfield and Powhatan Counties is a secondary state highway which runs from State Route 147 west to U.S. Route 522. It was primary State Route 44 until 1952.

=== SR 712 (Brunswick County) ===
State Route 712 in Brunswick County is an old alignment of the present US 1 corridor, bypassed in 1925. It runs 12.62 miles (20.31 km) from State Route 606, just south of U.S. Route 58 at Edgerton, north to US 1 at the Nottoway River. Until 1949, it was primary State Route 140.

=== SR 738 (Caroline, Hanover, and Spotsylvania Counties) ===
State Route 738 in Caroline, Hanover and Spotsylvania Counties, Virginia is a 38.38-mile (61.77 km) secondary state highway between Richmond and Fredericksburg. It begins at State Route 646 northwest of Hanover, heading north and west to cross U.S. Route 1 at Gum Tree. From there it heads gradually west and north, mostly along an old alignment of State Route 1 (now US 1), through Coatesville, Chilesburg, and Partlow. SR 738 ends at an intersection with State Route 208 and State Route 606 at Snell; SR 208 continues northeasterly via Spotsylvania to US 1 south of Fredericksburg.

=== SR 744 (Lee County) ===
State Route 744 in Lee County extends for 3.7 miles (6.0 km) from U.S. Route 58 Business east of Ewing south to the Tennessee state line. Its continuation in Tennessee is an unnumbered county road in the direction of Alanthus Hill and State Route 63. SR 744 was primary SR 62 until 1942.

=== SR 758 (Lee County) ===
State Route 758 in Lee County extends for 7.3 miles (11.7 km) from U.S. Route 58 west of Jonesville south to the Tennessee state line. Its continuation in Tennessee is an unnumbered county road in the direction of State Route 63 at Mulberry Gap. SR 758 was primary SR 63 until 1946.

=== SR 762 (Smyth and Washington Counties) ===
State Route 762 in Smyth and Washington Counties runs 11.85 miles (19.07 km) from State Route 91 at Lodi east to State Route 600 and State Route 660 at St. Clair Bottom and then north to Interstate 81 and State Route 107 in Chilhowie. Except for a realignment at St. Clair Bottom, SR 762 was primary State Route 79 until 1953. (The part west of St. Clair Bottom had been a primary state highway since 1924.)

=== SR 803 (Accomack County) ===
State Route 803 in Accomack County, also known as Causeway Road and Wallops Island Road, is a road that connects SR 679 (Atlantic Road) in Assawoman to the Wallops Island Flight Facility on Wallops Island.

=== SR 805 (Grayson County) ===
State Route 805 in Grayson County runs for 10.1 miles (16.3 km) from US 21 south of Dry Run Gap to SR 94 at Providence. SR 805 was primary State Route 95 until 1953.

=== SR 846 (Loudoun County) ===
State Route 846 in Loudoun County runs for 4.80 miles (7.72 km) from west of SR 28 through Sterling to north of SR 7. SR 846 begins as four-lane divided Sterling Boulevard at SR 1036 (Pacific Boulevard) west of SR 846's partial cloverleaf interchange with SR 28 (Sully Road). The state secondary route intersects the Washington and Old Dominion Railroad Trail and SR 625 (Church Road) within Sterling, where the boulevard has parallel service roads for much of its course. North of SR 7 (Leesburg Pike), SR 846 continues as Cardinal Glen Circle, a lollipop-shaped neighborhood street that curves around and ends at itself just north of the SR 7 intersection.

=== SR 5000 (James City County) ===
State Route 5000 in James City County is a secondary state highway. Known as Monticello Avenue, it runs for 3.7 miles (6.0 km) from State Route 5 (SR 5) southwest of Williamsburg, Virginia to the junction of State Route 321, State Route 615, and State Route 613 and serves as a spur route of SR 5.
