= Virginia State Route 656 =

State highway in Virginia, United States

State Route 656

Route information
- Maintained by VDOT

Location
- Country: United States
- State: Virginia

Highway system
- Virginia Routes; Interstate; US; Primary; Secondary; Byways; History; HOT lanes

State Route 656 (SR 656) in the U.S. state of Virginia is a secondary route designation applied to multiple discontinuous road segments among the many counties. The list below describes the sections in each county that are designated SR 656.

== List ==
County	Length (mi)	Length (km)	From	Via	To	Notes
Accomack	0.81	1.30	Dead End	Northside Road	SR 657 (Deep Creek Road)	
Albemarle	0.86	1.38	SR 654 (Barracks Road)	Georgetown Road	SR 743 (Hydraulic Road)	
Alleghany	0.02	0.03	Dead End	Unnamed road	SR 18 (Potts Creek Road)	
Amelia	4.54	7.31	US 360 (Patrick Henry Highway)	Amelia Avenue	US 360 Bus (Goodes Bridge Road)	
Amherst	1.01	1.63	SR 636 (High Peak Road)	Green Hill Road	SR 655 (Father Judge Road)	
Appomattox	5.40	8.69	SR 24 (Old Courthouse Road)	Horseshoe Road	SR 24 (Old Courthouse Road)	
Augusta	0.67	1.08	SR 608 (Cold Springs Road)	Offliter Road	SR 657 (Indian Ridge Road)	
Bath	0.35	0.56	Dead End	Mount Horeb Road	US 220 (Ingalls Boulevard)	
Bedford	1.14	1.83	Dead End	Planters Drive	SR 626 (Smith Mountain Lake Parkway)	
Bland	2.33	3.75	Dead End	Raleigh Grayson Turnpike	SR 98 (Main Street)	
Botetourt	0.22	0.35	US 220 (Roanoke Road)	College Drive	SR 674 (Tinker Mill Road)	
Brunswick	2.40	3.86	SR 644 (Grandy Road)	Union Woods Drive	Dead End	
Buchanan	3.90	6.28	US 460	Looney Creek Road	Dead End	
Buckingham	2.80	4.51	SR 20 (Constitution Route)	Well Water Road	SR 655 (Glenmore Road)	
Campbell	7.06	11.36	SR 606 (New Chapel Road)	Plum Branch Road Crews Shop Road	US 460 (Lynchburg Highway)	
Caroline	7.29	11.73	US 301/SR 648	Dry Bridge Road Colemans Mill Road	SR 207/SR 716	
Carroll	1.90	3.06	SR 638 (Dugspur Road)	Pineview Road	SR 628 (Burkes Fork Road)	
Charles City	0.10	0.16	SR 106 (Roxbury Road)	Bradley Road	SR 603 (Old Union Road)	
Charlotte	2.50	4.02	SR 40 (George Washington Highway)	Greenfield Road	SR 604 (Roanoke Bridge Road)	
Chesterfield	1.59	2.56	US 1 (Jefferson Davis Highway)	Bellwood Drive	Dead End	
Clarke	2.10	3.38	SR 659	Longmarsh Road	SR 632 (Crums Church Road)	
Craig	0.27	0.43	SR 646	Woodman Avenue	SR 678 (Brooks Street)	
Culpeper	0.80	1.29	SR 652 (Mitchell Road)	Woolens Lane	SR 658 (Mount Pony Road)	
Cumberland	0.15	0.24	SR 649 (High Street)	Church Street	SR 649 (High Street)	
Dickenson	5.40	8.69	SR 63 (Dante Mountain Road)	Unnamed road	SR 657 (East Hazel Mountain Road)	
Dinwiddie	5.85	9.41	SR 709 (Shipping Road)	Eppes Road Gatewood Road	SR 647 (Nash Road)	Gap between segments ending at different points along SR 650 Gap between segments ending at different points along US 1
Essex	1.25	2.01	SR 644 (Wildwood Road)	South Hill Banks Drive	Dead End	
Fairfax	1.17	1.88	US 29 (Lee Highway)	Legato Road	SR 608 (West Ox Road)	Gap between Caldicot Lane/Battenburg Lane and SR 3211 Gap between Random Hills Road and SR 7700
Fauquier	3.89	6.26	SR 651 (Main Street)	Franklin Street Remington Road	US 17 (Marsh Road)	
Floyd	0.45	0.72	SR 610 (Huffviller Road)	Deer Haven Road	Dead End	
Fluvanna	9.35	15.05	US 15 (James Madison Highway)	Bremo Road Bryants Ford Road	Dead End	Gap between segments ending at different points along SR 624 Gap between segments ending at different points along SR 6
Franklin	1.00	1.61	Henry County line	Deer Trail Road	SR 607 (Fairfield Road)	
Frederick	3.68	5.92	SR 655 (Sulphur Spring Road)	Greenwood Road Morgan Mill Road	SR 661 (Redbud Road)	Gap between segments ending at different points along SR 7
Giles	1.12	1.80	SR 660 (Staffordsville Road)	Moye Road	Dead End	
Gloucester	4.31	6.94	SR 636 (Brays Point Road)	Glass Road Coates Lane	Dead End	
Goochland	0.60	0.97	Dead End	Leabough Road	SR 614 (Dogtown Road)	
Grayson	2.20	3.54	SR 660 (Carsonville Road)	Pilgrim Fork Road	SR 805 (Spring Valley Road)	
Greene	0.19	0.31	SR 650 (Mount Olivet Road)	Old Schoolhouse Lane	Dead End	
Greensville	2.30	3.70	SR 625	Caney Branch Road	SR 626	
Halifax	3.05	4.91	US 58 (Philpott Road)	Hackberry Road	Pittsylvania County line	
Hanover	8.22	13.23	US 1 (Washington Highway)	Sliding Hill Road Mount Hermon Road	Dead End	
Henry	0.92	1.48	SR 606 (Original Henry Road)	Deer Trail Road	Franklin County line	
Highland	0.04	0.06	Dead End	Unnamed road	US 250	
Isle of Wight	0.67	1.08	US 258 (Great Mill Highway)	Union Camp Drive	SR 691 (Jamestown Lane)	
James City	1.04	1.67	SR 675 (Grove Heights Avenue)	Magruder Avenue Woodside Drive	Cul-de-Sac	
King and Queen	0.40	0.64	Dead End	Barn Gate Road	SR 610 (Coldwater Road)	
King George	0.32	0.51	SR 218 (Windsor Drive)	Rosiers Creek Lane	Dead End	
King William	0.16	0.26	SR 615 (Nelsons Bridge Road)	Oak Grove Lane	SR 615 (Nelsons Bridge Road)	
Lancaster	0.20	0.32	SR 695 (Windmill Point Road)	Oyster Creek Drive	SR 695 (Windmill Point Road)	
Lee	6.35	10.22	SR 662 (Curt Russell Road)	Old Friendship Road	SR 621 (Left Poor Valley Road)	Gap between segments ending at different points along SR 659
Loudoun	1.50	2.41	SR 661 (Limestone School Road)	Hibler Road	Dead End	
Louisa	5.40	8.69	US 33 (Jefferson Highway)	Cedar Hill Road	SR 618 (Fredericks Halls Road)	
Lunenburg	1.90	3.06	Dead End	Redfield Road	SR 626 (Kings Road)	
Madison	1.90	3.06	Dead End	Courtney Hollow Lane	SR 652 (Gaar Mountain Road)	
Mathews	0.30	0.48	Dead End	Risby Town Road	SR 633 (Old Ferry Road)	
Mecklenburg	0.70	1.13	Dead End	Deer Run Road	SR 655 (Skyline Road)	
Middlesex	0.40	0.64	SR 637 (Flats Road)	Burch Road	Dead End	
Montgomery	0.13	0.21	SR 625 (Big Falls Road)	Estates Drive	Cul-de-Sac	
Nelson	2.36	3.80	US 60	Gladstone Road	SR 622 (Allens Creek Road)	
New Kent	1.18	1.90	Dead End	Continental Road	SR 638 (Cosby Mill Road)	
Northumberland	1.40	2.25	SR 646 (Fairport Road)	Buzzards Point Road	Dead End	
Nottoway	0.40	0.64	Dead End	Friend Road	SR 612 (Old Richmond Road)	
Orange	0.62	1.00	SR 655 (Blue Run Road)	Brookman Road	Dead End	
Page	3.03	4.88	US 211 (Lee Highway)	Wispering Hill Lane Unnamed road	SR 611	Gap between segments ending at different points along SR 658
Patrick	1.20	1.93	SR 653 (Ayers Orchard Road)	Corns Road	SR 631 (Moorefield Store Road)	
Pittsylvania	4.30	6.92	Dead End	Wiles Road Kerns Church Road	Halifax County line	
Powhatan	0.70	1.13	Dead End	Goodwyn Road	SR 603 (Academy Road)	
Prince Edward	1.30	2.09	US 460 (Prince Edward Highway)	Price Lane	Dead End	
Prince George	1.50	2.41	SR 614 (Wards Creek Road)	Fort Powhatan Road	Dead End	
Prince William	2.40	3.86	SR 652 (Fitzwater Drive)	Kettle Run Road	SR 215 (Vint Hill Road)	
Pulaski	1.20	1.93	SR 693 (Julia Simpkins Road)	Old Hurst Road	Dead End	
Rappahannock	1.00	1.61	SR 622 (Aaron Mountain Road)	Comptons Road	Dead End	
Richmond	1.20	1.93	Dead End	Bryants Town Road	SR 617 (Normans Corner Road)	
Roanoke	0.30	0.48	SR 873 (Green Acres Road)	Moore Road	Dead End	
Rockbridge	0.40	0.64	Dead End	Green Lane	SR 655	
Rockingham	0.60	0.97	SR 655 (Lawyer Road)	Harper Mill Road	Dead End	
Russell	4.70	7.56	US 19	Poor Farm Road Elk Garden Road	SR 80 (Hayters Gap Road)	
Scott	2.20	3.54	SR 649 (Rye Cove Memorial Road)	Unnamed road	SR 653	
Shenandoah	1.38	2.22	SR 623 (Back Road)	Harrisville Road	SR 623 (Back Road)	
Smyth	3.90	6.28	SR 650 (South Fork Road)	Red Hill Road	SR 657 (Thomas Bridge Road)	
Southampton	2.60	4.18	SR 658 (Barrow Road)	Bryants Church Road Buckthorn Quarter Road	SR 652 (Indian Woods Trail)	Gap between segments ending at different points along US 58
Spotsylvania	5.20	8.37	SR 614 (Dickerson Road)	Towles Mill Road	SR 208 (Courthouse Road)	
Stafford	1.40	2.25	Dead End	Greenbank Road	SR 654 (Rocky Run Road)	
Surry	0.04	0.06	SR 637 (Pleasant Point Road)	Short Drive	SR 31 (Rolfe Highway)	
Sussex	3.80	6.12	SR 619 (Walkers Mill Road)	Unnamed road	SR 630 (Little Mill Road)	
Tazewell	3.00	4.83	US 19	Bailey Switch Road	SR 643 (Mud Fork Road)	Gap between segments ending at different points along SR 650
Warren	1.00	1.61	Front Royal town limits	Station Lane	Front Royal town limits	
Washington	2.60	4.18	SR 627 (Cowan Drive/Haskell Station Road)	Goose Creek Road	SR 657 (Rocky Hill Road)	Gap between segments ending at different points along SR 640
Westmoreland	0.60	0.97	SR 3 (Kings Highway)	Porter Lane	Dead End	
Wise	0.35	0.56	Dead End	Unnamed road	SR 654	
Wythe	1.31	2.11	Wytheville town limits	Rose Hill Road	SR 600 (Rose Hill Road/Akers Road)	
York	0.48	0.77	SR 629 (Goodwin Neck Road)	Middle Road	SR 629 (Dandy Loop Road)	
