= Virginia State Route 726 =

Secondary route designation

State Route 726

Route information
- Maintained by VDOT

Location
- Country: United States
- State: Virginia

Highway system
- Virginia Routes; Interstate; US; Primary; Secondary; Byways; History; HOT lanes

State Route 726 (SR 726) in the U.S. state of Virginia is a secondary route designation applied to multiple discontinuous road segments among the many counties. The list below describes the sections in each county that are designated SR 726.

== List ==
County	Length (mi)	Length (km)	From	Via	To	Notes
Accomack	0.25	0.40	Dead End	Thompson Road	SR 175 (Chincoteague Road)	
Albemarle	5.71	9.19	SR 627 (Warren Ferry Road)	James River Road	SR 795 (Blenheim Road)	
Amherst	1.10	1.77	Dead End	Waughs Ferry Road	US 29 Bus	
Augusta	6.07	9.77	Rockbridge County line	Beard Road Dutch Hollow Road	SR 252 (Middlebrook Road)	Gap between segments ending at different points along SR 620
Bedford	3.90	6.28	SR 619 (Pendleton Road/Jordantown Road)	Quarterwood Road Wilkerson Mill Road	US 460 (Lynchburg Salem Turnpike)	
Botetourt	3.05	4.91	SR 655 (Sunset Drive)	Lapsley Run Road	Dead End	
Campbell	4.29	6.90	US 460	Mount Athos Road	Appomattox County line	
Carroll	1.83	2.95	Galax city limits	Mill Creek Road Creekview Drive	Galax city limits	
Chesterfield	0.66	1.06	SR 2488 (Barberry Road)	Rivermont Road	SR 724 (Spruce Avenue)	
Dinwiddie	0.23	0.37	US 1 (Boydton Plank Road)	Mitchell Avenue	Dead End	
Fairfax	0.32	0.51	SR 988 (Valley Brook Drive)	Tansey Drive	SR 613 (Sleepy Hollow Road)	
Fauquier	6.50	10.46	SR 635 (Hume Road)	Fiery Run Road	SR 55 (John Marshall Highway)	
Franklin	5.95	9.58	SR 643 (Dillons Mill Road)	Wades Gap Road	SR 613 (Naff Road)	
Frederick	0.57	0.92	Dead End	Lakeview Circle	SR 277 (Fairfax Pike)	
Halifax	2.30	3.70	SR 716 (Mosely Ferry Trail)	Coleman Road	SR 344	
Hanover	0.85	1.37	SR 684 (Verdon Road)	Harley Road	Dead End	
Henry	0.50	0.80	SR 688 (Lee Ford Camp Road)	Blackfeather Trail	Dead End	
James City	0.36	0.58	SR 1401 (Spring Road)	Kingswood Drive	SR 727 (Oxford Road)	
Loudoun	1.20	1.93	SR 723 (Foundry Road)	Taylor Road	SR 709 (Sands Road)	
Louisa	1.00	1.61	SR 636 (Dumkum Store Road)	Lightwood Road	Dead End	
Mecklenburg	0.50	0.80	SR 737 (Nelson Church Road)	Old Garner Road	Dead End	
Montgomery	1.90	3.06	SR 615 (Old Pike Road)	Goldrush Road	SR 612 (High Rock Hill Road)	
Pittsylvania	12.85	20.68	US 58 (Philpott Road)	Ringgold Depot Road Kentuck Church Road Malmaison Road	US 29	
Prince George	0.18	0.29	Dead End	Scott Memorial Park	SR 106 (Courthouse Road)	
Prince William	0.14	0.23	SR 3241 (Hinson Mill Lane)	Mercury Drive	SR 694 (Coles Drive)	
Pulaski	1.20	1.93	SR 100 (Wysor Road)	Sayers Road	Dead End	
Roanoke	0.20	0.32	SR 930 (Suncrest Drive)	Circlebrook Drive	Dead End	
Rockbridge	7.90	12.71	SR 712	Unnamed road	Augusta County line	Gap between segments ending at different points along SR 724 Gap between segments ending at different points along SR 252
Rockingham	8.40	13.52	SR 612 (Peake Mountain Road)	War Branch Road Mount Clinton Pike Weavers Road Erickson Avenue Stone Spring Road Misty Court	Cul-de-Sac	Gap between segments ending at different points along SR 613 Gap between segments ending at different points along the Harrisonburg city limits
Scott	1.00	1.61	Dead End	Unnamed road	US 58 (Duff Pat Highway)	
Shenandoah	6.40	10.30	SR 610 (Orkney Springs Road)	Flat Rock Road	SR 613 (North Mountain Road)	
Spotsylvania	0.65	1.05	SR 208 (Courthouse Road)	Ryland Payne Road	SR 601 (Lewiston Road)	
Stafford	0.30	0.48	Dead End	Hall Lane	SR 655 (Holly Corner Road)	
Tazewell	0.03	0.05	Russell County line	Bridge Street	SR 670 (Mill Creek Road)	
Washington	5.25	8.45	SR 725 (Taylors Valley Road)	Chestnut Mountain Road	US 58 (Jeb Stuart Highway)	Gap between segments ending at different points along SR 859
Wise	0.48	0.77	Dead End	Unnamed road	SR 692	
York	0.43	0.69	Dead End	Semple Road	Dead End	
