= Virginia State Route 710 =

Secondary route designation

State Route 710

Route information
- Maintained by VDOT

Location
- Country: United States
- State: Virginia

Highway system
- Virginia Routes; Interstate; US; Primary; Secondary; Byways; History; HOT lanes

State Route 710 (SR 710) in the U.S. state of Virginia is a secondary route designation applied to multiple discontinuous road segments among the many counties. The list below describes the sections in each county that are designated SR 710.

== List ==
County	Length (mi)	Length (km)	From	Via	To	Notes
Accomack	2.34	3.77	US 13 (Lankford Highway)	Nelson Road Davis Road	US 13 (Lankford Highway)	
Albemarle	2.02	3.25	SR 760 (Red Hill Road)	Taylors Gap Road	SR 708 (Red Hill Road)	
Alleghany	0.18	0.29	SR 159 (Dunlap Creek Road)	Stonewall Lane	Dead End	
Amherst	0.60	0.97	SR 739 (Honey Bee Drive)	Kilmarnock Lane	SR 658 (Grandmas Hill Road)	
Augusta	3.40	5.47	SR 252 (Middlebrook Road)	Mill Lane Eidson Creek Road	SR 708 (Glebe School Road)	Gap between segments ending at different points along SR 695
Bedford	0.81	1.30	Dead End	Hidden Forest Drive	SR 755 (Morgans Mill Road)	
Botetourt	0.14	0.23	SR 779 (Valley Road)	Dooley Lane	Dead End	
Campbell	1.80	2.90	SR 711 (Tardy Mountain Road)	Oliver Road	Dead End	
Carroll	0.83	1.34	SR 620 (Forest Oak Road)	Daisy Road	SR 709 (Aspen Drive)	
Chesterfield	0.43	0.69	SR 637 (Hopkins Road)	Bellbrook Drive	SR 640 (Conifer Road/Old Hopkins Road)	
Dinwiddie	0.96	1.54	Dead End	Cemetery Road	SR 40 (Doyle Boulevard)	
Fairfax	1.85	2.98	SR 620 (Braddock Road)	Wakefield Chapel Road	SR 236 (Little River Turnpike)	
Fauquier	12.65	20.36	US 17 Bus/SR 55 (Main Street)	Rectortown Carr Lane Edmonds Lane	Dead End	
Franklin	0.65	1.05	Dead End	Parkview Drive	SR 697 (Brick Church Road)	
Frederick	0.36	0.58	SR 641 (Double Church Road)	Virginia Drive	SR 849 (West Street)	
Halifax	2.10	3.38	North Carolina state line	Bethel Hill Road	SR 711 (Harmony Road)	
Hanover	2.89	4.65	SR 640 (Shady Grove Road)	Academy Drive Verdi Lane	SR 627 (Pole Green Road)	
Henry	0.20	0.32	SR 648 (Stoney Mountain Road)	Granberry Road	Dead End	
James City	0.23	0.37	SR 704 (Shore Drive)	Colony Point Road	Cul-de-Sac	
Loudoun	0.65	1.05	SR 709 (Hughes Street)	Saint Paul Street	SR 7 Bus (Colonial Highway)	
Louisa	1.40	2.25	Dead End	Johnson Mill Road	SR 635 (Willow Brook Road)	
Mecklenburg	4.90	7.89	SR 4 (Buggs Island Road)	Alexander Ferry Road Lucindas Dirt Road	SR 712 (Palmer Springs Road)	Gap between segments ending at different points along SR 711
Montgomery	1.50	2.41	Dead End	Blue Spring Road	SR 620 (Blue Spring Road)	
Pittsylvania	5.17	8.32	SR 656 (Kerns Church Road)	Double Creek Road Reeves Mill Road	SR 660 (Reeves Mill Road/Alderson Road)	
Prince George	1.58	2.54	SR 156 (Prince George Drive)	Sebera Road	SR 609 (Old Stage Road)	
Prince William	0.16	0.26	SR 658 (Owls Nest Road)	Lauran Place	Cul-de-Sac	
Pulaski	7.59	12.21	Dead End	Mount Olivet Road	Pulaski town limits	
Roanoke	0.33	0.53	Cul-de-Sac	Yale Drive	US 11 (Main Street)	
Rockbridge	6.26	10.07	SR 252 (Brownsburg Turnpike)	Swope Lane Sterrett Road Red Hill Road	SR 608 (South River Road)	Gap between segments ending at different points along SR 717
Rockingham	2.31	3.72	Harrisonburg city limits	Greendaile Road Reservoir Street	Harrisonburg city limits	
Scott	0.90	1.45	Dead End	Unnamed road	SR 619	
Shenandoah	7.78	12.52	Dead End	Unnamed road Hamburg Road Unnamed road	SR 691 (Judge Rye Road)	Gap between segments ending at different points along SR 263 Gap between segments ending at different points along SR 703 Gap between segments ending at different points along SR 707
Spotsylvania	0.70	1.13	SR 3 (Plank Road)	Taskforce Drive Maple Grove Drive Bragg Road	Dead End	
Stafford	0.61	0.98	Dead End	Hudson Road	SR 218 (White Oak Road)	
Tazewell	0.16	0.26	Dead End	Chinkapin Trail	SR 602 (Pleasant Hill Church Road)	
Washington	5.62	9.04	Tennessee state line	Sweet Hollow Road Alvarado Road Saturn Drive	SR 708 (Bethel Road)	
Wise	0.14	0.23	Dead End	Unnamed road	SR 709	
York	0.35	0.56	Dead End	Lodge Road	SR 641 (Penniman Road)	
