= Virginia State Route 691 =

State highway in Virginia, United States

State Route 691

Route information
- Maintained by VDOT

Location
- Country: United States
- State: Virginia

Highway system
- Virginia Routes; Interstate; US; Primary; Secondary; Byways; History; HOT lanes

State Route 691 (SR 691) in the U.S. state of Virginia is a secondary route designation applied to multiple discontinuous road segments among the many counties. The list below describes the sections in each county that are designated SR 691.

== List ==
County	Length (mi)	Length (km)	From	Via	To	Notes
Accomack	2.70	4.35	SR 687 (Bethel Church Road)	Groton Town Road John Taylor Road	SR 679 (Atlantic Road/Metompkin Road)	Gap between segments ending at different points along US 13
Albemarle	12.84	20.66	Dead End	Castle Rock Road Ortman Road Greenwood Road Jarmans Gap Road Tabor Street Hill Top Street	Dead End	Gap between segments ending at different points along SR 690
Alleghany	0.50	0.80	SR 774 (Staunton Road)	Second Avenue	Dead End	
Amelia	0.70	1.13	Dead End	Bird Grove Lane	SR 640 (Perkinson Road/Jetersville Road)	
Amherst	1.10	1.77	Dead End	Tinsley Lane	SR 650 (Perch Road)	
Appomattox	5.10	8.21	SR 647 (Salem Road)	Pumping Station Road Lee Grant Avenue Court Street	SR 131 (Court Street/Main Street)	
Augusta	1.00	1.61	Dead End	Hay Cock Knob Lane	SR 600 (Marble Valley Road)	
Bath	0.25	0.40	Dead End	Forbes Hollow Road	SR 637 (Lower Yard Road)	
Bedford	12.86	20.70	US 460/US 221 (Lynchburg Salem Turnpike)	Quarterwood Road Quarles Road Thaxton Mountain Road Robertson Road Shepherds Store Road	SR 747 (Joppa Mill Road)	Gap between segments ending at different points along SR 726 Gap between segments ending at different points along SR 755 Gap between segments ending at different points along SR 684 Gap between segments ending at different points along SR 746
Botetourt	0.70	1.13	Dead End	Church Street	SR 634 (Cedar Lane)	
Brunswick	1.70	2.74	SR 631 (Antioch Road)	Ebenezer Road	SR 712 (Old Stage Road)	
Buchanan	2.50	4.02	SR 645	Unnamed road	Dead End	
Buckingham	2.30	3.70	SR 646 (Union Church Road)	Miller Camp Road	SR 24	
Campbell	1.04	1.67	SR 683 (Lawyers Road)	Pacoman Road	SR 682 (Leesville Road)	
Caroline	1.48	2.38	SR 654 (Kidds Fork Road)	Selph Lane	Dead End	
Carroll	14.29	23.00	SR 620 (Old Pipers Gap Road)	Flower Gap Road Bear Trail Orchard Gap Road Keno Road	SR 640 (Keno Road/Parkside Drive)	Gap between segments ending at different points along US 52 Gap between segments ending at different points along SR 608
Charles City	0.13	0.21	SR 156	Unnamed road	Cul-de-Sac	
Charlotte	4.20	6.76	SR 638 (Wheelers Spring Road)	Tower Road	Prince Edward County line	
Chesterfield	1.63	2.62	Dead End	Walnut Drive Burgess Road	Dead End	Gap between segments ending at different points along SR 10
Craig	0.25	0.40	SR 311 (Craig Valley Drive)	Mountain Breeze Lane	Dead End	
Culpeper	0.30	0.48	US 15 (James Madison Highway)	Carver School Lane	SR 657 (General Winder Road)	
Cumberland	0.50	0.80	Dead End	Blanton Farm Road	SR 45 (Cumberland Road)	
Dickenson	0.90	1.45	SR 607	Wilderness Lane	Dead End	
Dinwiddie	1.00	1.61	Dead End	Cryors Road	SR 40 (Old Cryors Road)	
Essex	1.55	2.49	US 360 (Richmond Highway)	Gordons Mill Road	US 360 (Richmond Highway)	
Fairfax	1.57	2.53	Arlington County line	Rockingham Road Rockingham Street Rhode Island Avenue Massachusetts Avenue Vermont Avenue Valley Wood Road Franklin Park Road	Arlington County line	
Fauquier	12.91	20.78	SR 688 (Leeds Manor Road)	Old Waterloo Road Wilson Road Carters Run Road	US 17 (Winchester Road)	
Floyd	0.60	0.97	US 221 (Floyd Highway)	Lazy Lane	Dead End	
Franklin	6.13	9.87	SR 919 (Grassy Hill Road)	Burgess Road Taylors Road Bonbrook Road	SR 687 (Alean Road)	Gap between segments ending at different points along US 220 Gap between segments ending at different points along SR 635
Frederick	0.15	0.24	SR 671 (Shockeysville Road/Green Spring Road)	Holiday Road	Dead End	
Giles	0.20	0.32	Dead End	Palisades Drive	SR 813 (Cliffview Street)	
Gloucester	0.40	0.64	SR 3 (John Clayton Memorial Highway)	Foster Road	SR 3 (John Clayton Memorial Highway)	
Goochland	0.25	0.40	SR 644 (Miller Lane)	Stage Coach Road	Dead End	
Grayson	5.40	8.69	SR 274 (Riverside Drive)	Fulton Road Pine Mountain Road Doe Run Road Pine Mountain Road	SR 660 (Carsonville Road)	
Greene	0.11	0.18	Cul-de-Sac	Business Park Circle	SR 690	
Greensville	1.20	1.93	SR 634 (Bass Road)	Cedar Lane	Dead End	
Halifax	2.00	3.22	SR 658 (Melon Road)	Stebbins Road	SR 659 (River Road)	
Hanover	3.36	5.41	SR 611 (Saint Peters Church Road)	Canterbury Road	SR 610 (Bethany Church Road)	
Henry	0.30	0.48	North Carolina state line	Madison Road	SR 692 (Horsepasture Price Road)	
Isle of Wight	1.27	2.04	End State Maintenance	Butler Farm Road Jamestown Lane	US 58 Bus (Carrsville Highway)	
James City	0.09	0.14	SR 5 (John Tyler Memorial Highway)	Paddock Lane	SR 666 (Cooley Road)	
King and Queen	0.22	0.35	SR 605 (York River Road)	Apple Road	SR 33 (Lewis Puller Memorial Highway)	
King George	0.18	0.29	SR 683 (Ferry Dock Road)	Rosedale Drive	Dead End	
Lancaster	0.29	0.47	Dead End	Carters Cove Drive	SR 632 (Johns Neck Road)	
Lee	2.01	3.23	Tennessee state line	Wheeler Road Unnamed road	Dead End	
Loudoun	3.45	5.55	SR 693 (George Road)	Rehobeth Church Road Bolington Road	SR 850 (Picnic Woods Road)	
Louisa	1.10	1.77	US 33 (Spotswood Trail)	Old Louisa Road	Orange County line	
Lunenburg	2.70	4.35	SR 622 (Ontario Road)	Jupiter Creek Drive	SR 690 (Davis Low Grand Road)	
Madison	2.20	3.54	SR 230 (Orange Road)	Lost Mountain Road	SR 607 (Elly Road)	
Mathews	0.25	0.40	SR 602 (Sand Bank Road)	Heath Road	Dead End	
Mecklenburg	2.80	4.51	SR 688 (Skipwith Road)	Daniels Road	SR 677 (Wilkerson Road)	
Middlesex	0.25	0.40	SR 602 (Old Virginia Street)	Streets Lane	SR 602 (Old Virginia Street)	
Montgomery	0.87	1.40	SR 672 (Camp Carysbrook Road)	Camp Carysbrook Road	Dead End	
Nelson	0.16	0.26	Dead End	Center Hill Lane	SR 656 (Gladstone Road)	
New Kent	0.27	0.43	Dead End	North Tunstall Station Road	SR 619 (Hopewell Road)	
Northampton	0.50	0.80	Dead End	Downing Beach Road	SR 613	
Northumberland	0.40	0.64	SR 631 (Clarketown Road)	Clarketown Road	Dead End	
Nottoway	1.20	1.93	Dead End	Dogwood Road	SR 650 (Mallory Hill Road)	
Orange	0.12	0.19	Louisa County line	Old Louisa Road	SR 1015 (Pendleton Street/South Main Street)	
Page	0.37	0.60	SR 763	Unnamed road	Dead End	
Patrick	2.40	3.86	Dead End	Brook Loop Mountain Valley Drive Blueberry Lane	Dead End	Gap between segments ending at different points along SR 680
Pittsylvania	5.14	8.27	SR 1431 (Neighborhood Road)	Mill Creek Road Motley Road	SR 649 (Sheva Road)	Gap between segments ending at different points along SR 685
Prince Edward	1.28	2.06	Charlotte County line	Tower Road	Dead End	Gap between SR 47 and SR 665
Prince William	0.17	0.27	Cul-de-Sac	Wooded Acres Court	SR 626 (Harvey Road)	
Pulaski	0.50	0.80	SR 759 (C V Jackson Road)	McGavock Creek Road	Dead End	
Rappahannock	0.12	0.19	Dead End	Unnamed road	US 211 (Lee Highway)	
Richmond	0.85	1.37	Westmoreland County line	Northernmost Road	Dead End	
Roanoke	1.41	2.27	Dead End	Dawnwood Road	SR 690 (Poage Valley Road)	
Rockbridge	2.30	3.70	Dead End	Unnamed road	SR 609	Gap between segments ending at different points along SR 610
Rockingham	0.80	1.29	FR-237/SR 992	Ford View Road	Dead End	
Russell	0.10	0.16	Dead End	Ruby Lane	SR 615 (Gravel Lick Road)	
Scott	1.80	2.90	US 58 (Bristol Highway)	Spurrier Cemetery Lane	SR 614 (A P Carter Highway)	Gap between segments ending at different points along SR 689
Shenandoah	16.08	25.88	CR 59 (Lower Cove Run Road) (former WV 59)	Judge Rye Road Cold Spring Road Dellinger Acres Road Swover Creek Road	SR 809 (Union Force Church Road)	
Smyth	1.95	3.14	Marion town limits	Johnstone Road	SR 689 (Hutton Branch Road)	
Southampton	0.50	0.80	SR 658 (Cedar View Road)	Royal Oak Road	US 58 (Southampton Parkway)	
Spotsylvania	1.51	2.43	SR 656 (Towles Road)	Black Rock Drive	SR 208 (Courthouse Road)	
Stafford	2.08	3.35	US 17 (Warrenton Road)	Storck Road	SR 612 (Hartwood Road)	
Tazewell	0.36	0.58	Bluefield town limits	Unnamed road	Dead End	
Washington	1.00	1.61	SR 80 (Hayters Gap Road)	Clinch Mountain Road	Dead End	
Westmoreland	0.10	0.16	Richmond County line	Northernmost Road	SR 642 (Baynesville Road)	
Wise	0.70	1.13	SR 645 (Dotson Creek Road)	Unnamed road	SR 680	
Wythe	1.40	2.25	SR 670	Fairview Church Road	SR 749 (Cedar Springs Road)	
York	0.23	0.37	Cul-de-Sac	Elliott Road	SR 171 (Victory Boulevard)	
