= Virginia State Route 709 =

Secondary route designation

State Route 709

Route information
- Maintained by VDOT

Location
- Country: United States
- State: Virginia

Highway system
- Virginia Routes; Interstate; US; Primary; Secondary; Byways; History; HOT lanes

State Route 709 (SR 709) in the U.S. state of Virginia is a secondary route designation applied to multiple discontinuous road segments among the many counties. The list below describes the sections in each county that are designated SR 709.

== List ==
County	Length (mi)	Length (km)	From	Via	To	Notes
Accomack	11.59	18.65	Dead End	Pitts Creek Road Farlow Road Depot Street Horntown Road Justice Road	Dead End	Gap between segments ending at different points along SR 705 Gap between segments ending at different points along SR 710 Gap between segments ending at different points along SR 679
Albemarle	0.39	0.63	Cul-de-Sac	Shadwell Road	US 250 (Richmond Road)	
Alleghany	0.32	0.51	Dead End	Unnamed road	SR 661 (Midland Trail)	
Amherst	0.20	0.32	SR 710 (Kilmarnock Lane)	Dumbarton Drive	SR 739 (Honey Bee Drive)	
Augusta	2.10	3.38	SR 710 (Eidson Creek Road)	Smoky Row Road	SR 252 (Middlebrook Road)	
Bedford	3.70	5.95	SR 24 (Wyatts Way)	New London Road	SR 811 (Evington Road)	
Botetourt	0.50	0.80	SR 681 (Zion Hill Road)	Rolling Hills Road	Dead End	
Campbell	5.00	8.05	Dead End	Horselys Bridge Road Blackwater Road	SR 692 (Masons Mill Road)	
Carroll	5.44	8.75	SR 620 (Forest Oak Road)	Aspen Drive Birchtree Road	SR 702 (Stable Road)	
Chesterfield	0.51	0.82	Cul-de-Sac	Le Master Road	SR 630 (Graves Road)	
Dinwiddie	8.73	14.05	SR 609 (Cherryhill Road)	Shipping Road	SR 650 (Hamilton Arms Road)	
Fairfax	0.85	1.37	Dead End	Tobin Road Woodburn Road	SR 650 (Gallows Road)	
Fauquier	9.64	15.51	US 17 (Winchester Road)	Belvoir Road Zulla Road	US 50 (John Mosby Highway)	
Franklin	5.68	9.14	SR 734 (Hopkins Road)	Hopkins Road Blue Bend Road Jamestown Road	Dead End	
Frederick	2.70	4.35	SR 636 (Huttle Road)	Ridings Mill Road	SR 735 (Salem Church Road)	
Halifax	0.80	1.29	Dead End	Blanes Mill Lane	SR 708 (Cedar Grove Road)	
Hanover	0.80	1.29	US 33 (Mountain Road)	Chewning Road	US 33 (Mountain Road)	
Henry	1.60	2.57	SR 687 (Preston Road)	Jordan Creek Road	SR 627 (Wingfield Orchard Drive)	
James City	0.22	0.35	SR 724 (Dogwood Drive)	Chestnut Drive	SR 617 (Lake Powell Road)	
Loudoun	4.73	7.61	SR 611 (Telegraph Springs Road)	Chapelle Hill Road Sands Road Hughes Street Ivandale Road	SR 711 (Piggott Bottom Road)	Gap between segments ending at different points along SR 722 Gap between segments ending at different points along SR 7 Bus
Louisa	0.50	0.80	Dead End	Blueberry Lane	SR 208 (Courthouse Road)	
Mecklenburg	1.80	2.90	SR 615 (Redlawn Road)	Eureka Road	SR 663 (Cedar Grove Road)	
Montgomery	0.10	0.16	SR 808 (Hightop Road)	Field Drive	Dead End	
Pittsylvania	0.70	1.13	Dead End	Herman Farmer Road	SR 360 (Old Richmond Road)	
Prince George	0.13	0.21	SR 106 (Courthouse Road)	Administration Drive	Loop	
Prince William	1.90	3.06	SR 611 (Valley View Drive)	Crockett Road	SR 649 (Old Church Road)	
Pulaski	1.05	1.69	SR 100 (Wysor Road)	Burleigh Horton Road	SR 654 (Old Baltimore Road)	
Roanoke	0.25	0.40	Dead End	Lemon Lane	SR 618 (Highland Road)	
Rockbridge	1.60	2.57	SR 706	McCrorys Hill Road	SR 608	
Rockingham	1.10	1.77	SR 704 (Osceola Springs Road)	Autumn Lane	SR 710 (Greendaile Road)	
Scott	0.75	1.21	SR 689	Unnamed road A P Carter Highway	US 58 (Bristol Highway)	
Shenandoah	4.51	7.26	SR 715 (Orchard Road)	Buck Hill Road	SR 694 (Wolverton Road)	
Spotsylvania	0.54	0.87	Dead End	Alsop Town Road	SR 648 (Block House Road)	
Stafford	1.13	1.82	SR 630	Flatford Road	Dead End	
Tazewell	0.09	0.14	SR 771 (Finch Avenue)	Chestnut Street	SR 102	
Washington	0.90	1.45	SR 722 (Blue Springs Road)	Rivermont Road	SR 803 (Rebel Records Lane/Cedar Creek Road)	
Wise	0.10	0.16	SR 658 (River View Road)	Unnamed road	SR 1127 (Augusta Road)	
York	0.87	1.40	SR 620 (Oriana Road)	Burts Road	US 17 (George Washington Memorial Highway)	
