= Virginia State Route 722 =

Secondary route designation

State Route 722

Route information
- Maintained by VDOT

Location
- Country: United States
- State: Virginia

Highway system
- Virginia Routes; Interstate; US; Primary; Secondary; Byways; History; HOT lanes

State Route 722 (SR 722) in the U.S. state of Virginia is a secondary route designation applied to multiple discontinuous road segments among the many counties. The list below describes the sections in each county that are designated SR 722.

== List ==
County	Length (mi)	Length (km)	From	Via	To	Notes
Accomack	0.27	0.43	SR 658 (Bayside Road)/SR 661 (Drummonds Mill Road)	Ayres Circle	SR 658 (Bayside Road)	
Albemarle	5.33	8.58	Nelson County line	Glade Road Old Green Mountain Road	SR 6 (Irish Road)	Gap between segments ending at different points along SR 602
Amherst	0.70	1.13	SR 632 (Emmanuel Church Road)	Panther Mountain Road	Dead End	
Augusta	2.10	3.38	US 250 (Churchville Avenue)	Vinegar Hill Road	US 250 (Churchville Avenue)	
Bedford	8.17	13.15	SR 731 (Chestnut Fork Road)	Quaker Church Road Wilson Church Road Old Country Road Five Forks Road	SR 43 (Virginia Byway)	
Botetourt	1.60	2.57	US 220 (Botetourt Road)	Chatham Road	US 220 (Botetourt Road)	
Campbell	0.42	0.68	Dead End	Tobacco Lane	SR 643 (Lewis Ford Road)	
Carroll	7.19	11.57	SR 887 (Glendale Road)	Pine City Road Lakeside Drive Commonwealth Drive Cranberry Road	Galax city limits	
Chesterfield	1.78	2.86	SR 36 (River Road)	Halloway Avenue	SR 628 (Hickory Road)	
Dinwiddie	0.81	1.30	SR 619 (Courthouse Road)	Abernathy Road	Dead End	
Fairfax	0.29	0.47	Prince William County line	Unnamed road	SR 123 (Ox Road)	
Fauquier	0.40	0.64	SR 647 (Crest Hill Road)	Elihu Road	Dead End	
Franklin	2.68	4.31	SR 619 (Sontag Road)	Beulah Road	SR 803 (Edgewood Road)	
Frederick	0.24	0.39	SR 673 (Glendobbin Road)	Quaker Lane	Dead End	
Halifax	1.10	1.77	SR 721 (Piney Creek Road)	Heath Road	SR 720 (Guill Town Road)	
Hanover	2.20	3.54	SR 631 (Old Ridge Road)	Landmark Cedar Road	SR 680 (Shiloh Church Road)	
Henry	1.66	2.67	SR 666 (Trenthill Road)	Lacky Hill Road	SR 674 (Philpott Road)	
James City	0.24	0.39	SR 666 (Cooley Road)	Deer Spring Road Unnamed road	SR 652 (Stanley Drive)	Gap between segments ending at different points along SR 687
Loudoun	6.17	9.93	Dead End	Cockerill Road Lincoln Road Saint Francis Court	SR 287 (Berlin Turnpike)	Gap between segments ending at different points along SR 728 Gap between the Purcellville town limits and a dead end
Louisa	0.50	0.80	SR 618 (Fredericks Hall Road)	Garretts Mill Road	Dead End	
Mecklenburg	13.61	21.90	SR 601 (Love Town Road)	Pooles Mill Road Carters Point Road Cow Road Noblin Farm Road Burlington Drive Old Rock Road	Dead End	Gaps between segments ending at different points along US 58 Gap between dead ends Gap between segments ending at different points along US 15
Montgomery	0.90	1.45	Dead End	Lavender Road	SR 639 (Mount Pleasant Road)	
Pittsylvania	0.84	1.35	US 58/SR 948	Oakwood Drive	Dead End	
Prince William	0.25	0.40	SR 730 (Inn Street)	Meyers Road	Dead End	
Pulaski	0.70	1.13	SR 648 (Snider Lane)	Veterans Hills Road	SR 793 (Old Robinson Tract Road)	
Rockbridge	0.80	1.29	SR 252 (Brownsburg Turnpike)	Rocky Lane	SR 726	
Rockingham	3.00	4.83	SR 620 (Mountain Valley Road)	Armentrout Path	SR 620 (Mountain Valley Road)	
Scott	3.36	5.41	SR 649 (Rye Cove Memorial Drive)	Mabe Stanleytown Road Cove Creek Road Unnamed road	Dead End	
Shenandoah	0.50	0.80	SR 263 (Orkney Grade)	Mount Hermon Drive	SR 721 (Kelly Road)	
Spotsylvania	0.90	1.45	SR 606 (Morris Road)	Tanglewood Road	Dead End	
Stafford	0.30	0.48	Dead End	Paul Hill Road	SR 604 (Belle Plains Road)	
Tazewell	0.50	0.80	Dead End	Glenbrook Road	SR 721 (Teri Road)	
Washington	6.70	10.78	SR 710 (Saturn Drive/Alvarado Road)	Osceola Road Blue Springs Road McGinnis Lane	Dead End	Gap between segments ending at different points along US 58 Gap between segments ending at different points along SR 91
Wise	2.60	4.18	Dead End	Maple Gap Road	SR 616	
York	0.76	1.22	SR 723 (Fillmore Drive)	Duncan Drive Richwine Drive	SR 719 (Westover Drive)	
