= Virginia State Route 653 =

Secondary state highway in Virginia, United States

State Route 653

Route information
- Maintained by VDOT

Location
- Country: United States
- State: Virginia

Highway system
- Virginia Routes; Interstate; US; Primary; Secondary; Byways; History; HOT lanes

State Route 653 (SR 653) in the U.S. state of Virginia is a secondary route designation applied to multiple discontinuous road segments among the many counties. The list below describes the sections in each county that are designated SR 653.

== List ==
County	Length (mi)	Length (km)	From	Via	To	Notes
Accomack	2.90	4.67	Dead End	Poplar Cove Road	SR 658 (Town Road)	
Albemarle	0.14	0.23	SR 601 (Free Union Road)	Old Free Union Road	Dead End	
Alleghany	0.39	0.63	Dead End	Unnamed road	SR 648 (Horse Mountain View Road)	
Amelia	2.70	4.35	SR 608 (Little Patrick Road)	Horseshoe Loop	SR 608 (Little Patrick Road)	
Amherst	3.80	6.12	SR 130 (Elon Road)	Unnamed road	SR 636 (High Peak Road)	
Appomattox	2.24	3.60	SR 721 (Vineyard Road)	Spanish Oaks Road	SR 608 (Stonewall Road)	
Augusta	1.00	1.61	SR 831 (Old White Hill Road)	Twin Hill Road	SR 651 (Churchmans Mill Road)	
Bath	0.12	0.19	US 220 (Ingalls Boulevard)	Rose Lane	Dead End	
Bedford	6.37	10.25	Dead End	Trails End Road Goodview Road Mill Iron Road Masons Lane	SR 616 (Saunders Road)	Gap between segments ending at different points along SR 655 Gap between segments ending at different points along SR 757
Bland	0.20	0.32	SR 738 (Byrnes Chapel Road)	Osborne Drive	Dead End	
Botetourt	1.40	2.25	US 220 (Roanoke Road)	Wesley Road Kinzie Road Humbert Road	SR 652 (Mountain Pass Road)	Gap between dead ends
Brunswick	4.00	6.44	SR 137	Mount Zion Road	SR 618 (Woodsdale Drive)	
Buchanan	2.00	3.22	SR 643 (Hurley Road)	Coon Branch Road	Dead End	
Buckingham	3.10	4.99	SR 602 (Howardsville Road)	Logan Road	SR 627 (Axtell Road)	
Campbell	0.20	0.32	SR 761 (Long Island Road)	School Road	Dead End	
Caroline	3.45	5.55	SR 652 (Signboard Road)	Burruss Lane	US 301 (Richmond Turnpike)	
Carroll	1.51	2.43	US 58 (Danville Pike)	Dust Trail Road	SR 654 (Laurel Fork Road)	
Charles City	0.12	0.19	SR 609 (Barnetts Road)	Mount Pleasants Road	SR 603 (Old Union Road)	
Charlotte	2.80	4.51	SR 40 (George Washington Highway)	Richardson Road Maple Road	SR 651 (Country Club Road)	Gap between segments ending at different points along SR 652
Chesterfield	15.96	25.69	Dead End	Second Branch Road Qualla Road Courthouse Road	US 60 (Midlothian Turnpike)	Gap between segments ending at different points along SR 655 Gap between segments ending at different points along SR 604
Clarke	3.40	5.47	SR 632 (Crums Church Road)	Kimble Road	SR 7 (Harry Flood Byrd Highway)	
Craig	0.43	0.69	SR 659	5th Street	Dead End	
Culpeper	0.30	0.48	Dead End	Wilhoite Lane	SR 615 (Rapidan Road)	
Cumberland	6.40	10.30	Dead End	High Hill Road Cooks Road	SR 638 (John Randolph Road)	
Dickenson	0.41	0.66	SR 611	Unnamed road	Dead End	
Dinwiddie	0.16	0.26	SR 703 (Carson Road)	Richie Road	Dead End	
Essex	1.27	2.04	SR 606 (Fairfield Lane)	Tuscarora Road	Dead End	
Fairfax	3.68	5.92	SR 641 (Pohick Road)	Roberts Parkway Sideburn Road Roberts Road	Fairfax city limits	Gap between SR 651 and a dead end Gap between segments ending at different points along SR 651 Gap between segments ending at different points along SR 620
Fauquier	3.30	5.31	SR 668 (Savannah Branch Road)	Morgansburg Road	US 17 (Marsh Road)	
Floyd	6.00	9.66	SR 610 (Daniels Run Road)	Shawsville Pike	Montgomery County line	
Fluvanna	2.40	3.86	Louisa County line	Three Chopt Road	US 250 (Broad Street Road)	
Franklin	1.59	2.56	SR 636 (Wysong Mill Road)	Ellis Road	Dead End	
Frederick	0.90	1.45	SR 671 (Green Spring Road)	McCubbin Road	West Virginia state line	
Giles	1.60	2.57	SR 659 (Spring Valley Road)	Eatons Chapel Road	SR 663 (Sugar Run Road)	
Gloucester	2.68	4.31	SR 216 (Guinea Road)/SR 649	Kings Creek Road	Dead End	
Goochland	1.85	2.98	SR 605 (Shannon Hill Road)	Three Chopt Road	SR 604 (Whitsell Road)	
Grayson	4.60	7.40	SR 604 (Rabbit Hollow Road)	Arrowhead Drive	SR 602 (Brush Creek Road)	
Greene	0.47	0.76	Cul-de-Sac	Fairlane Drive	US 33 (Spotswood Trail)	
Greensville	0.30	0.48	SR 687 (Mill Road)	Fairground Road	SR 652 (Inge Avenue)	
Halifax	3.50	5.63	SR 360/SR 903	Ball Park Loop	SR 360 (Mountain Road)	
Hanover	1.07	1.72	SR 643 (New Ashcake Road)	Whipporwill Road	US 301/SR 2 (Chamberlayne Road)	
Henry	0.70	1.13	SR 57 (Fairystone Park Highway)	Mount Herman Church Road	SR 57 (Fairystone Park Highway)	
Highland	0.60	0.97	Dead End	Unnamed road	SR 617	
Isle of Wight	0.60	0.97	SR 641 (Harvest Drive)	Glen Haven Drive	Suffolk city limits	
James City	0.30	0.48	SR 689 (Gilley Drive)	Duer Drive	SR 5 (John Tyler Memorial Highway)	
King and Queen	0.70	1.13	SR 609 (New Hope Road)	Coates Lane	Dead End	
King George	1.00	1.61	Dead End	Midway Road	SR 686 (Mount Rose Drive)	
King William	0.65	1.05	Dead End	Towinque Farm Road	SR 656 (Oak Grove Lane)	
Lancaster	1.50	2.41	Dead End	Bewdley Road	SR 354 (River Road)	
Lee	2.60	4.18	Dead End	Maple Hill Road	US 58	
Loudoun	4.50	7.24	SR 621 (Evergreen Mill Road)	Shreve Mill Road Cochran Mill Road	Crosstrail Boulevard	Gap between segments ending at different points along SR 625
Louisa	1.00	1.61	Fluvanna County line	Grace Johnson Road	SR 659 (Kents Store Road)	
Lunenburg	8.24	13.26	SR 49 (Earl Davis Gregory Highway)	Poorhouse Road Unnamed road Poorhouse Road Nottoway Falls Road	SR 40 (Broad Street)	
Madison	1.03	1.66	SR 231 (Blue Ridge Turnpike)	Blankenbaker Road	SR 638 (Hebron Church Road)	
Mathews	1.00	1.61	SR 198 (Buckley Hall Road)	Holly Point Road	Dead End	
Mecklenburg	1.00	1.61	Dead End	Mile Road	SR 637 (Chaptico Road)	
Middlesex	0.34	0.55	SR 3 (Twiggs Ferry Road)	City of Refuge Road	SR 3 (Twiggs Ferry Road)	
Montgomery	0.26	0.42	Floyd County line	Alleghany Spring ROad	SR 637 (Jewell Drive)	
Nelson	9.70	15.61	SR 655 (Variety Mills Road)	Wilson Road Oak Ridge Road Freshwater Cove Lane	Dead End	
New Kent	0.30	0.48	Dead End	Macon Lane	SR 619 (Hopewell Road)	
Northumberland	2.25	3.62	Dead End	Whays Creek Road	US 360 (Northumberland Highway)	
Nottoway	0.40	0.64	Dead End	Whitmore Town Road	SR 607 (Jennings Town Road)	
Orange	1.50	2.41	SR 651 (Terrys Run Road)	Orange Springs Road	Spotsylvania County line	
Page	1.09	1.75	SR 675 (Bixlers Ferry Road)	Sedwick Road	SR 654	
Patrick	9.14	14.71	SR 8 (Salem Highway)	Ayers Orchard Road South Fork Loop Santa Claus Lane	SR 694 (Dogwood Road)	Gap between segments ending at different points along US 58
Pittsylvania	3.30	5.31	SR 634 (Blue Ridge Drive)	Izaak Walton Road	SR 642 (Shula Drive)	
Powhatan	0.92	1.48	US 60 (James Anderson Highway)	Buckingham Road	US 60 (James Anderson Highway)	
Prince Edward	0.90	1.45	SR 609 (Olive Branch Road)	Vaughn Road	Dead End	
Prince George	7.17	11.54	SR 611 (Brandon Road)	Upper Brandon Road Willow Hill Road	SR 611 (Lebanon Road)	
Prince William	4.85	7.81	SR 646 (Aden Road)	Parkgate Drive	SR 646 (Aden Road)	
Pulaski	4.50	7.24	SR 609 (Boyd Road/Pine Run Road)	Clark Ferry Road	SR 609 (Boyd Road)	
Rappahannock	0.70	1.13	SR 612 (Hull School Road/Old Hollow Road)	Sycamore Ridge Road	SR 600 (Pickeral Ridge Lane/Swindler Hollow Road)	
Richmond	0.90	1.45	SR 3 (History Land Highway)	Sanfords Lane	Dead End	
Roanoke	0.13	0.21	Dead End	Grubb Road	SR 688 (Cotton Hill Road)	
Rockbridge	0.06	0.10	Dead End	Lackey Lane	SR 690 (Padgetts Hill Road)	
Rockingham	0.10	0.16	US 11 (Valley Pike)	Toll Gate Lane	Dead End	
Russell	2.05	3.30	SR 640 (River Mountain Road)	Creekwood Road Lewis Creek Road	SR 645 (Coxtown Road)	Gap between a dead end and SR 651
Scott	20.56	33.09	SR 871 (Natural Tunnel Parkway)	Mabe Stanleytown Road Unnamed road Hunters Valley East Road	SR 72	
Shenandoah	4.32	6.95	SR 623 (Back Road)	Brook Creek Road Creek Road Unnamed road	SR 747 (Riverview Drive)	Gap between segments ending at different points along US 11 Gap between segments ending at different points along SR 650
Smyth	2.36	3.80	SR 604 (Ramblewood Drive)	Red Stone Road	SR 648 (Grinstead Hollow Road)	Gap between segments ending at different points along SR 645
Southampton	21.24	34.18	SR 730 (Whitehead Road/Little Texas Road)	Little Texas Road Pinopolis Road Main Street Carys Bridge Road	SR 35	
Spotsylvania	3.60	5.79	Orange County line	Orange Springs Road Jones Powell Road	SR 601 (Lawyers Road)	Gap between segments ending at different points along SR 652
Stafford	1.80	2.90	Dead End	Hulls Chapel Road	SR 753 (Enon Road)	
Surry	0.60	0.97	SR 616 (Golden Hill Road)	Edgar Lane	Dead End	
Sussex	3.21	5.17	SR 606 (Beaver Dam Road)	Bank Street Hunter Street Bank Street Spring Branch Road	SR 613 (Petersburg Road)	Gap between segments ending at different points along SR 40 Gap between segments ending at different points along US 460
Tazewell	1.00	1.61	SR 655 (Joe Hunt Road)	Boulder Road	SR 643 (Mud Fork Road)	
Washington	0.20	0.32	SR 663 (Golden View Drive)	Cleveland Church Road	Dead End	
Westmoreland	0.55	0.89	SR 640 (Grants Hill Church Road)	Waverly Road	SR 624 (Flat Iron Road)	
Wise	1.00	1.61	US 58 Alt	Unnamed road	Cul-de-Sac	
Wythe	2.80	4.51	SR 654 (Berea Road)	Greasy Creek Road	SR 690 (Crockett Road)	
York	0.30	0.48	SR 613 (Darby Road)	Firby Road	Dead End	
