= Virginia State Route 695 =

Secondary route designation

State Route 695

Route information
- Maintained by VDOT

Location
- Country: United States
- State: Virginia

Highway system
- Virginia Routes; Interstate; US; Primary; Secondary; Byways; History; HOT lanes

State Route 695 (SR 695) in the U.S. state of Virginia is a secondary route designation applied to multiple discontinuous road segments among the many counties. The list below describes the sections in each county that are designated SR 695.

== List ==
County	Length (mi)	Length (km)	From	Via	To	Notes
Accomack	15.78	25.40	Dead End	Saxis Road Temperanceville Road Wisharts Point Road	Dead End	Gap between segments ending at different points along SR 694
Albemarle	0.30	0.48	Dead End	Crown Orchard Road	SR 693 (Stillhouse Creek Road/Burnt Mountain Road)	
Alleghany	0.25	0.40	SR 721	Pioneer Road	Dead End	
Amelia	0.40	0.64	Dead End	Flinn Lane	SR 607 (West Creek Road)	
Amherst	2.30	3.70	Dead End	Wilderness Creek Road	SR 650 (Perch Road)	
Appomattox	1.69	2.72	SR 635 (Redfields Road)	Mountain Cut Road	US 460 (Richmond Highway)	
Augusta	6.45	10.38	SR 701 (Howardsville Road)	Arborhill Road Sugarloaf Road	Dead End	Gap between segments ending at different points along SR 252
Bath	0.25	0.40	SR 611 (College Lane)	Cave Hill Road	Dead End	
Bedford	10.01	16.11	US 460/US 221 (Lynchburg Salem Turnpike)	Goose Creek Valley Road	Botetourt County line	
Botetourt	0.40	0.64	Dead End	Catawba Creek Road	US 220 (Botetourt Road)	
Brunswick	1.11	1.79	SR 46 (Christanna Highway)	Fox Lane First Avenue Union Street	SR 1004 (Belt Road)	
Buchanan	0.01	0.02	Dead End	Cripple Bridge Road	SR 617 (Little Prater Road)	
Buckingham	3.97	6.39	SR 678 (Rock Island Road)	White Rock Road B-A-H Road	Dead End	
Campbell	4.80	7.72	SR 682 (Leesville Road)	Johnson Creek Road	SR 626 (Johnson Mountain Road)	
Caroline	0.84	1.35	US 301/SR 2	Edwards Road	US 301/SR 2/FR 814 (School Street)	
Carroll	1.00	1.61	North Carolina state line	Chestnut Grove Road	SR 696 (Holly Grove Road)	
Charlotte	2.80	4.51	SR 617 (Old Well Road)	Rough Creek Road	SR 727 (Red House Road)	
Chesterfield	0.18	0.29	Dead End	Garnett Lane	SR 707 (LE Gordon Drive)	
Craig	0.10	0.16	SR 694	Unnamed roads	Dead End	
Culpeper	0.58	0.93	US 522 (Sperryville Pike)	Boston Drive	SR 707 (Slate Mills Road)	
Cumberland	0.25	0.40	Dead End	Lewis Road	SR 699 (Thompson Drive)	
Dickenson	0.60	0.97	Dead End	Unnamed road	SR 619 (Skeetrock Road)	
Essex	0.45	0.72	SR 615 (Mussel Swamp Road)	Bell Lane	Dead End	
Fairfax	7.55	12.15	SR 4363 (Richelieu Drive)	Idylwood Road Kirby Road	SR 123 (Chain Bridge Road)	Gap between a dead end and a cul-de-sac
Fauquier	0.77	1.24	SR 628 (Blantyre Road)	McRaes Road	Dead End	
Floyd	0.30	0.48	SR 8 (Webbs Mill Road)	Needmore Lane Galen Lane	SR 8 (Webbs Mill Road)	
Fluvanna	0.30	0.48	Dead End	Deer Lane	US 15 (James Madison Highway)	
Franklin	0.95	1.53	Dead End	Isolane Road	SR 640 (Five Mile Mountain Road)	
Frederick	3.20	5.15	US 522 (Frederick Pike)	Middle Fork Road	West Virginia state line	
Giles	0.20	0.32	SR 626 (Mill Road)	Peck Street	SR 623 (Cascade Drive)	
Gloucester	0.25	0.40	SR 643 (Cuba Road)	Railway Road	Dead End	
Goochland	0.40	0.64	US 250 (Broad Street Road)	Waddy Drive	Cul-de-Sac	
Grayson	3.30	5.31	SR 654 (Peach Bottom Road)	Vista Road	SR 691 (Pine Mountain Road)	
Halifax	0.30	0.48	Dead End	Buckskin Trail	SR 624 (Coles Ferry Road)	
Hanover	2.29	3.69	SR 657 (Peaks Road)	Cadys Mill Road	US 301/SR 2 (Hanover Courthouse Road)	
Henry	12.96	20.86	North Carolina state line	George Taylor Road Spencer-Preston Road	SR 687 (Preston Road)	
Isle of Wight	0.30	0.48	Dead End	Ramos Way	SR 665 (Campbells Chapel Drive)	
James City	0.27	0.43	SR 694 (Lake Drive)	Ware Road	SR 694 (Lake Drive)	
King George	0.55	0.89	Dead End	Goby Lane	SR 218 (Caledon Road)	
Lancaster	7.69	12.38	SR 3 (Rappahannock Drive)	Chesapeake Drive Windmill Point Road	Dead End	
Lee	0.80	1.29	SR 682	Unnamed road	SR 669	
Loudoun	0.70	1.13	SR 662 (Clover Hill Road)	Creek Lane	Dead End	
Louisa	2.40	3.86	SR 640 (Jack Jouett Road)	Hamilton Road	SR 613 (Poindexter Road)	
Lunenburg	2.60	4.18	SR 623 (Plantersville Road)	Eubank Road	SR 622 (Ontario Road)	
Madison	0.80	1.29	Dead End	Yager Mountain Road	SR 655 (Glebe Lane)	
Mathews	0.10	0.16	Dead End	Wharf Creek Road	SR 633 (Old Ferry Road)	
Mecklenburg	7.60	12.23	SR 688 (Skipwith Road)	Philbeck Crossroads	SR 605 (Dairy Farm Road)	
Middlesex	1.06	1.71	US 17 (Tidewater Trail)	Mount Zion Road	SR 602 (Old Virginia Street)	
Montgomery	3.00	4.83	Dead End	Chestnut Ridge Road	SR 672 (Big Branch Road)	
Nelson	0.22	0.35	Dead End	Blue Rock Lane	SR 151 (Patrick Henry Highway)	
New Kent	0.49	0.79	Cul-de-Sac	Holly Pines Lane	SR 600 (Holly Fork Road)	
Northampton	0.85	1.37	Dead End	Cedar Grove Farm Road	SR 619 (Bayside Road)	
Northumberland	0.50	0.80	US 360 (Northumberland Highway)	Blundons Road	SR 640 (Hull Neck Road)	
Nottoway	0.10	0.16	US 360 Bus/US 460 Bus	North Cauthorne Street	Dead End	
Orange	0.30	0.48	SR 602 (Black Walnut Road)	Pine Tree Road	Dead End	
Page	0.50	0.80	SR 689 (Ida Road)	Grace Church Lane	SR 689 (Ida Road)	
Patrick	1.70	2.74	SR 694 (Hardin Reynolds Road)	Mill Creek Road	SR 626 (Abram Penn Highway)	
Pittsylvania	2.80	4.51	Danville city limits	Twin Arch Road	SR 721 (Livestock Road)	
Prince Edward	3.77	6.07	US 460 (Prince Edward Highway)	Tuggle Road Fairgrounds Road	US 15 Bus/US 460	Gap between SR 768 and US 15 Bus/US 460
Prince George	1.40	2.25	SR 618 (Hitchcock Road)	Easy Street	SR 635 (Centennial Road)	
Prince William	1.39	2.24	Dead End	Sinclair Mill Road	SR 234 (Dumfries Road)	
Pulaski	0.34	0.55	SR 114 (Peppers Ferry Boulevard)	Old Peppers Ferry Loop	SR 114 (Peppers Ferry Boulevard)	
Richmond	0.15	0.24	US 360 (Richmond Road)	Church Lane	SR 629 (Bell Drive)	
Roanoke	1.02	1.64	Dead End	Ridgelea Road	SR 694 (Twelve O'Clock Knob Road)	
Rockbridge	0.20	0.32	Dead End	Hartsook Road	SR 608 (Forge Road)	
Rockingham	1.60	2.57	US 340 (East Side Highway)	Old Country Road	SR 253 (Port Republic Road)	
Russell	0.12	0.19	SR 683 (Memorial Drive)	Trout Farm Road	SR 615 (Red Oak Ridge Road)	
Scott	1.20	1.93	Tennessee state line	Unnamed road	SR 618	
Shenandoah	0.60	0.97	SR 698 (Palmyra Church Road)	Swann Road	Dead End	
Smyth	1.85	2.98	SR 16 (Sugar Grove Highway)	Dickeys Creek Road Teas Road Slemp Creek Road	SR 16 (Sugar Grove Highway)	Gap between segments ending at different points along SR 601 Gap between segments ending at different points along SR 16
Southampton	0.10	0.16	US 58 (Southampton Parkway)	Old Belford Road	SR 652 (Old Belfield Road)	
Spotsylvania	0.16	0.26	US 1 (Jefferson Davis Highway)	Mosby Street	US 1 Bus	
Stafford	0.09	0.14	Dead End	Manse Road	US 17 (Warrenton Road)	
Tazewell	0.50	0.80	Dead End	Dairy Barn Road	SR 644 (Abbs Valley Road)	
Washington	4.30	6.92	SR 692 (Whites Mill Road)	Chip Ridge Road Grandview Road	Dead End	Gap between segments ending at different points along SR 700
Westmoreland	0.90	1.45	SR 668 (Taylor Town Road)	Edge Hill Road	Dead End	
Wise	0.50	0.80	Dead End	Unnamed road	US 23	
Wythe	0.36	0.58	Dead End	Earles Road	SR 616 (Murphyville Road)	
York	0.07	0.11	SR 619 (Anchor Drive)	Misty Drive	Dead End	
