= Virginia State Route 659 =

State highway in Virginia, United States

State Route 659

Route information
- Maintained by VDOT

Location
- Country: United States
- State: Virginia

Highway system
- Virginia Routes; Interstate; US; Primary; Secondary; Byways; History; HOT lanes

State Route 659 (SR 659) in the U.S. state of Virginia is a secondary route designation applied to multiple discontinuous road segments among the many counties. The list below describes the sections in each county that are designated SR 659.

== List ==
County	Length (mi)	Length (km)	From	Via	To	Notes
Accomack	4.70	7.56	US 13 Bus (Tasley Road)	Wharton Road Sawyer Drive Parsons Road	SR 661 (John Cane Road)	
Albemarle	1.20	1.93	SR 631 (Rio Road West)	Woodburn Road	Dead End	
Alleghany	0.10	0.16	SR 159 (Dunlap Creek Road)	Station Road	Dead End	
Amelia	2.80	4.51	SR 612 (Richmond Road)	Oak Grove Loop	SR 612 (Richmond Road)	
Amherst	6.67	10.73	US 29 Bus	Second Street Depot Street Union Hill Road Buffalo Ridge Road	Dead End	Gap between segments ending at different points along SR 604
Appomattox	1.09	1.75	SR 613 (Police Tower Road)	Phelps Branch Road	SR 26 (Oakville Road)	
Augusta	0.20	0.32	US 11 (Lee Jackson Highway)	Peyton Hill Road	SR 657 (Indian Ridge Road)	
Bath	0.08	0.13	Dead End	Park Drive	SR 658 (Park Lane)	
Bedford	1.46	2.35	SR 660 (Old Farm Road)	Hawkins Mill Road	Lynchburg city limits	
Bland	0.45	0.72	US 52 (South Scenic Highway)	GB Keglely Drive	Dead End	
Botetourt	0.20	0.32	US 221/US 460	Laymantown Road	SR 658 (Welches Run Road)	
Brunswick	10.87	17.49	SR 662 (Tilman Road)	Doctor Purdy Road Brodnax Road Main Street	US 58 (Piney Pond Road)	Formerly SR 139
Buchanan	1.90	3.06	SR 650 (Home Creek Road)	Left Fork Home Creek Road	Dead End	
Buckingham	6.33	10.19	SR 602 (Howardsville Road)	Watoga Road Ranson Road	SR 20 (Constitution Route)	Gap between segments ending at different points along SR 658
Campbell	1.55	2.49	US 460 (Lynchburg Highway)	Cabin Field Road	SR 609 (Stage Road)	
Caroline	1.50	2.41	SR 658 (Jericho Road)	Palace Green Road	Dead End	
Carroll	1.20	1.93	SR 654 (Laurel Fork Road)	Bear Creek Road	Dead End	
Charles City	1.01	1.63	Dead End	Old Ferry Road	SR 5 (John Tyler Memorial Highway)	
Charlotte	0.60	0.97	SR 660 (Taro Road)	McCoys Shop Road	SR 671 (County Line Road)	
Chesterfield	5.40	8.69	SR 602 (River Road)	Riverway Road Hensley Road	SR 654 (Spring Run Road)	Gap between segments ending at different points along SR 655
Clarke	2.40	3.86	SR 660 (Russell Road)	Unnamed road	SR 761 (Old Charles Town Road)	
Craig	0.44	0.71	SR 638	Unnamed road	SR 649	
Culpeper	0.11	0.18	SR 641 (Lakemont Drive)	Fox Groves Road	Dead End	
Cumberland	0.43	0.69	SR 684 (Cartersville Road Extension)	Tamworth Road	Dead End	
Dickenson	0.28	0.45	Dead End	Unnamed road	SR 646	
Dinwiddie	3.80	6.12	SR 665 (Walkers Mill Road)	Jones Road Bain Road	SR 619 (Courthouse Road)	
Essex	3.49	5.62	SR 627 (Airport Road)	Desha Road	Dead End	
Fairfax	3.20	5.15	Dead End	Union Mill Road	SR 620 (Braddock Road)	Gap between segments ending at different points along SR 658
Fauquier	0.60	0.97	Dead End	Fox Groves Road	SR 651 (Freemans Ford Road)	
Floyd	2.99	4.81	SR 610 (Huffville Road)	Lick Ridge Road Griffith Creek Road	SR 660 (Goose Creek Run Road)	
Fluvanna	14.80	23.82	SR 6 (Saint James Street)	Stage Junction Road Cedar Lane Road Kents Store Way	Louisa County line	
Franklin	4.40	7.08	SR 890 (Snow Creek Road)	Ramsey Memorial Road Bar Ridge Road Hunts Road	SR 647 (Kay Fork Road)	Gap between segments ending at different points along SR 946
Frederick	4.10	6.60	SR 7 (Berryville Pike)	Valley Mill Road Burnt Factory Road	SR 664 (Jordan Springs Road)	
Giles	4.99	8.03	SR 100 (Pulaski Giles Turnpike)	Wabash Road Spring Valley Road Sugar Run Road Prospectdale Roa	SR 100 (Pulaski Giles Turnpike)	
Gloucester	0.70	1.13	SR 634 (Shelly Road)	Horsley Road	SR 633 (Cedar Bush Road)	
Goochland	0.25	0.40	SR 6 (Patterson Avenue)	Creekmore Road	Dead End	
Grayson	3.15	5.07	SR 658 (Comers Rock Road)	Valley View Road Tiny Wood Lane Hunters Lane	Dead End	
Greene	0.19	0.31	SR 600 (Shotwell Road)	Ashley Lane	Cul-de-Sac	
Greensville	2.40	3.86	SR 603 (Gaston Road)	Fountain Creek Road	SR 627 (Brink Road)	
Halifax	17.77	28.60	Pittsylvania County line	Brooklyn Road River Road	SR 654 (Sinai Road)	
Hanover	0.85	1.37	SR 657 (Ashcake Road)	Cheroy Road	SR 656 (Mount Hermon Road)	
Henry	0.84	1.35	Dead End	Park Lane Lovell Drive	SR 777 (Mount Olivet Road)	Gap between US 58 and a dead end
Isle of Wight	0.40	0.64	Dead End	Kings Cove Way	US 17/US 258/SR 32 (Carrollton Boulevard)	
James City	1.25	2.01	Dead End	Menzels Road	SR 631 (Little Creek Dam Road)	
King and Queen	2.40	3.86	Dead End	Mantapike Landing Road	SR 14 (The Trail)	
King George	0.65	1.05	SR 206 (Dahlgren Road)	Hobson Lane	Dead End	
King William	0.25	0.40	Dead End	Vessels Lane	SR 608 (Upshaw Road)	
Lancaster	1.00	1.61	Dead End	Crab Point Road	SR 637 (James Wharf Road)	
Lee	8.44	13.58	SR 899 (Beech Springs Road)	Sugar Run Road	US 58 Alt/SR 716 (Veterans Memorial Highway)	
Loudoun	17.58	28.29	Prince William County line	Gum Spring Road Belmont Ridge Road	Upper Belmont Place	Gap between segments ending at different points along SR 621
Louisa	0.72	1.16	Fluvanna County line	Kents Store Road	US 250 (Three Notch Road)	
Lunenburg	5.42	8.72	SR 675 (Trinity Road/Hardy Road)	Old Mansion Road	SR 643 (New Grove Road)	
Madison	0.29	0.47	Dead End	Madison Mills Lane	US 15 (James Madison Highway)	
Mathews	0.50	0.80	SR 660	Osprey Road	Dead End	
Mecklenburg	0.90	1.45	SR 635 (Saffold Road)	Hillside Road	SR 764 (Piney Creek Road)	
Middlesex	0.13	0.21	Dead End	Marina Drive	SR 636 (Timberneck Road)	
Montgomery	1.98	3.19	SR 114 (Peppers Ferry Boulevard)	Vickers Switch Road	SR 114 (Peppers Ferry Boulevard)	
Nelson	0.10	0.16	SR 151 (Patrick Henry Highway)	Zion Hill Road	Dead End	
New Kent	0.25	0.40	SR 273 (Farmers Drive)	Parks Road	SR 30/SR 33 (Eltham Road)	
Northampton	0.14	0.23	US 13 Bus	Church Street	SR 630 (Old Town Neck Road)	
Northumberland	0.64	1.03	Dead End	Menhaden Road	SR 657 (Fleeton Road)	
Nottoway	1.20	1.93	SR 726 (Walnut Hill Road)	Mount Nebo Road	SR 614 (Courthouse Road)	
Orange	0.60	0.97	Dead End	Douglas Road	SR 658 (Hamm Road)	
Page	1.30	2.09	SR 635 (Forest Road)	Piney Woods Road	SR 637 (Piney Hill Road)	
Patrick	0.95	1.53	Dead End	Lawson Lane	SR 660 (Five Forks Road)	
Pittsylvania	2.60	4.18	SR 729 (Kentuck Road)	Laurel Grove Road	Halifax County line	
Powhatan	0.15	0.24	SR 711 (Robius Road)	Caesartown Road	Dead End	
Prince Edward	2.90	4.67	SR 664 (Singleton Road)	Buffalo Church Road	SR 658 (Five Forks Road)	
Prince George	1.90	3.06	Sussex County line	Jolly Road	SR 619 (Holdsworths Road)	
Prince William	0.26	0.42	SR 234 (Sudley Road)	Gum Spring Road	Loudoun County line	
Pulaski	0.70	1.13	Dead End	Duncan Road	SR 693 (Julia Simpson Road)	
Rappahannock	1.30	2.09	SR 641 (Fodderstack Road)	Resettlement Road	SR 628 (Dearing Road)	
Richmond	0.50	0.80	Dead End	Spring Hill Road	SR 690 (Menokin Road)	
Roanoke	1.72	2.77	SR 666 (Bandy Road)	Mayfield Drive Mount Pleasant Boulevard Randal Drive	SR 658 (Rutrough Road)	Gap between SR 866 and SR 617
Rockbridge	2.60	4.18	SR 644	Little Drivey Hollow Road	SR 644	
Rockingham	1.88	3.03	US 340 (East Side Highway)	Port Republic Road	SR 663 (Browns Gap Road)	
Russell	2.10	3.38	SR 660 (Coal Tipple Hollow Road)	Stone Bruise Road	SR 654 (Pittston Road)	
Scott	9.60	15.45	SR 72	River Bluff Road Twin Springs Road	SR 65	Gap between segments ending at different points along SR 680
Shenandoah	0.15	0.24	SR 263	Shrine Mont Circle	End Loop	
Smyth	5.70	9.17	SR 660 (Tallwood Drive)	Ebenezer Road Old Ebenezer Road	Dead End	Gap between segments ending at different points along SR 645 Gap between segments ending at different points along SR 617
Southampton	13.37	21.52	SR 666	Vicks Mill Road Pinopolis Road Drewry Road	SR 612 (Rivers Mill Road)	Gap between segments ending at different points along SR 653
Spotsylvania	2.80	4.51	SR 208 (Courthouse Road)	Lanes Corner Road	SR 606 (Post Oak Road)	
Stafford	1.44	2.32	SR 610 (Garrisonville Road)	Doc Stone Road	Dead End	
Surry	0.61	0.98	Cul-de-Sac	Marina Road	SR 31 (Rolfe Highway)	
Sussex	1.19	1.92	Dead End	Unnamed road Gee Farm Road	SR 40 (Sussex Drive)	
Tazewell	3.75	6.04	West Virginia state line	Exhibit Mine Road Shop Hollow Road	West Virginia state line	Gap between segments ending at different points along SR 644
Warren	0.50	0.80	SR 603 (Howellsville Road)	Unnamed road	Dead End	
Washington	6.02	9.69	Bristol city limits	Clear Creek Road Parigin Road Buffalo Pond Road	SR 700 (Rich Valley Road)	Gap between segments ending at different points along SR 645
Westmoreland	0.90	1.45	SR 3 (Kings Highway)	Kenwood Road	SR 3 (Kings Highway)	
Wise	0.65	1.05	SR 658 (River View Road)	Unnamed road	Dead End	
Wythe	5.89	9.48	SR 661 (Sally Run Road)	Rockdale Road	SR 603	
York	0.63	1.01	Dead End	Dogwood Road	SR 238 (Yorktown Road)	
