= Virginia State Route 651 =

State highway in Virginia, United States

State Route 651

Route information
- Maintained by VDOT

Location
- Country: United States
- State: Virginia

Highway system
- Virginia Routes; Interstate; US; Primary; Secondary; Byways; History; HOT lanes

State Route 651 (SR 651) in the U.S. state of Virginia is a secondary route designation applied to multiple discontinuous road segments among the many counties. The list below describes the sections in each county that are designated SR 651.

== List ==
County	Length (mi)	Length (km)	From	Via	To	Notes
Accomack	0.80	1.29	SR 648	Folley Creek Road	Dead End	
Albemarle	0.80	1.29	SR 631 (Rio Road)	Wakefield Road Free State Road	Dead End	
Alleghany	0.43	0.69	US 60 (Midland Trail)	Unnamed road	US 60 (Midland Trail)	
Amelia	1.50	2.41	SR 616 (Genito Road)	Archers Creek Lane	Dead End	
Amherst	2.90	4.67	SR 130 (Elon Road)	Lewis Keith Road	SR 643 (Wagon Trail Road)	
Appomattox	3.40	5.47	SR 614 (Forbes Road)	Webb Mill Road	SR 626 (Holiday Lake Road)	
Augusta	2.80	4.51	SR 654 (White Hill Road)	Churchmans Mill Road	SR 608 (Tinkling Spring Road)	
Bath	0.15	0.24	Dead End	Stagger Lane	US 220 (Ingalls Boulevard)	
Bedford	2.55	4.10	Roanoke County line	Mountain View Road Short Cut Road Perch Road	SR 645 (Holcomb Rock Road)	Gap between SR 24 and SR 657 Gap between segments ending at different points along US 501
Bland	0.22	0.35	Dead End	Rock Wall Drive	SR 604 (Walkers Creek Road)	
Botetourt	4.71	7.58	SR 824 (Sunset Court)	Sunset Avenue Stoney Battery Road	US 11 (Lee Highway)	Gap between segments ending at different points along US 11
Brunswick	1.39	2.24	SR 640 (Piney Woods Road)	Twin Road	SR 634 (Liberty Road)	
Buchanan	5.50	8.85	SR 650 (Lesters Fork Road)	Left Fork Lesters Road	SR 650 (Lesters Fork Road)	
Buckingham	2.99	4.81	SR 20 (Constitution Route)	Muddy Creek Road	SR 622 (Sharon Church Road/Melita Road)	
Campbell	11.98	19.28	SR 650 (Mollies Creek Road)	Bear Creek Road	SR 24 (Village Highway)	
Caroline	4.42	7.11	US 301 (Richmond Turnpike)	North Wales Road Mount Gideon Road Baylor Road Old Dawn Road	US 301 (Richmond Turnpike)	
Carroll	1.50	2.41	US 58 (Danville Pike)	Gibson Knob Road	SR 652 (Hereford Road)	
Charles City	0.20	0.32	SR 155 (Courthouse Road)	Legion Road	Dead End	
Charlotte	5.95	9.58	SR 604 (Abilene Road)	Morton Road McGee Road Mount Harmony Road Whitehead Road Country Club Road	US 15 (Farmville Highway)	Gap between segments ending at different points along SR 654 Gap between segments ending at different points along SR 652
Chesterfield	10.70	17.22	Dead End	North Bailey Bridge Road Claypoint Road Newbys Bridge Road Belmont Road	SR 150	Gap between segments ending at different points along SR 604
Clarke	1.50	2.41	SR 621	Clay Hill Road	SR 255 (Bishop Meade Highway)	
Craig	0.76	1.22	Dead End	Hall Road	SR 621 (Upper Craig Creek Road)	
Culpeper	0.38	0.61	SR 652 (Mitchell Road)	Hardy Lane	SR 652 (Mitchell Road)	
Cumberland	0.50	0.80	Dead End	Raines Tavern Road	SR 636 (Cedar Lane)	
Dickenson	7.55	12.15	SR 650	Unnamed road	SR 652 (Dr Ralph Stanley Highway)	
Dinwiddie	9.30	14.97	SR 613 (Gills Bridge Road)	Whitmore Road Mason Church Road	Dead End	Gap between segments ending at different points along SR 650
Essex	0.66	1.06	Dead End	Rockingham Road Norton Point Road	Dead End	
Fairfax	4.41	7.10	SR 653 (Sideburn Road)	New Guinea Road Guinea Road	SR 236 (Little River Turnpike)	Gap between SR 5498 and SR 7137 Gap between segments ending at different points along SR 652
Fauquier	23.21	37.35	US 17 (Marsh Road/Warrenton Road)	Sumerduck Road Main Street Freemans Ford Road Lees Mill Road	US 15/US 17/US 29 (James Madison Highway)	Gap between segments ending at a dead end
Floyd	6.06	9.75	SR 681 (Franklin Pike)	Stuart Road	US 221 (Floyd Highway)	
Fluvanna	1.20	1.93	SR 6 (West River Road)	Thessalonia Road	Dead End	
Franklin	3.16	5.09	Pittsylvania County line	Walker Road	SR 646 (Doe Run Road)	
Frederick	2.00	3.22	SR 649 (Springdale Road)	Shady Elm Road	SR 652 (Apple Valley Road)	
Giles	1.25	2.01	Dead End	Stockpen Mountain Road	SR 649 (Lurich Road)	
Gloucester	0.97	1.56	SR 652 (Guinea Circle)	Browns Bay Road	Dead End	
Goochland	2.80	4.51	SR 667 (Old Columbia Road)	Lowry Road	SR 610 (Community House Road)	
Grayson	2.60	4.18	SR 805 (Spring Valley Road)	Lonesome Oak Road Leafwood Road	SR 805 (Spring Valley Road)	
Greene	0.23	0.37	SR 604 (Celt Road)	Still Pond Road	SR 604 (Celt Road)	
Greensville	4.40	7.08	SR 610 (Slagles Lake Road)	Nottoway Road Unnamed road	SR 619 (Purdy Road)	Gap between segments ending at different points along SR 608
Halifax	2.32	3.73	US 501 (Main Street)	Cowford Road	SR 614 (Love Shop Road)	
Hanover	4.12	6.63	SR 643 (Rural Point Road)	Georgetown Road	US 301/SR 2 (Hanover Courthouse Road)	
Henry	2.15	3.46	SR 619 (Max Kendal Road)	North Fork Road	SR 57 (Chatham Road)	
Highland	0.07	0.11	SR 654 (Johnston Road)	Unnamed road	Dead End	
Isle of Wight	3.70	5.95	US 258 (Courthouse Highway)	Trump Town Road	SR 620 (Foursquare Road)	
James City	0.28	0.45	SR 143 (Merrimac Trail)	Davis Drive	SR 143 (Merrimac Trail)	
King and Queen	1.00	1.61	Dead End	Dewsville Road	SR 625 (Byrds Mill Road)	
King George	0.72	1.16	SR 218 (Caledon Road)	Valley Hill Loop	SR 218 (Caledon Loop)	
King William	1.00	1.61	Dead End	Shooting Box Road	SR 632 (Mount Olive-Cohoke Road)	
Lancaster	0.89	1.43	SR 3 (Mary Ball Road)	Boys Camp Road	Dead End	
Lee	0.70	1.13	SR 647 (Millers Chapel Road)	Fleenortown Road	Dead End	
Loudoun	2.80	4.51	SR 650 (Gleedsville Road)	Gap Road Hogback Mountain Road	SR 797 (Mount Gilead Road)	Gap between segments ending at different points along US 15
Louisa	1.20	1.93	SR 669 (Ellisville Drive)	Cales Drive	Orange County line	
Lunenburg	3.20	5.15	SR 653 (Poorhouse Road)	Redbanks Road	SR 652 (Marshaltown Road)	
Madison	5.70	9.17	Dead End	Aylor Road	SR 231 (Blue Ridge Turnpike)	
Mathews	0.80	1.29	SR 660 (River Road)	Myrtle Grove Lane	Dead End	
Mecklenburg	3.12	5.02	SR 664 (Union Level Road)	Plank Road	South Hill town limits	
Middlesex	1.17	1.88	SR 640 (Waterview Road)	Smokey Point Road Point Breeze Road	Dead End	
Nelson	3.80	6.12	US 29 (Thomas Nelson Highway)	Stevens Cove Road Fortunes Cove Lane Fortunes Cove Road Fortunes Cove Lane	Dead End	
New Kent	0.80	1.29	SR 249 (New Kent Highway)	Angelview Lane	Dead End	
Northampton	0.15	0.24	SR 613 (Silver Road)	Chesapeake Avenue	Dead End	
Northumberland	1.00	1.61	SR 644 (Sunny Bank Road)	Smith Point Road	Dead End	
Nottoway	3.22	5.18	SR 723 (Lewiston Plank Road)	Old School House Road	SR 625 (Courthouse Road)	
Orange	13.20	21.24	Louisa County line	Ellisville Road Thornhill Road Terry's Run Road Tatum Road	Spotsylvania County line	Gap between segments ending at different points along SR 612
Page	0.45	0.72	US 340	Hideaway Lane	SR 685 (Newport Road)	
Patrick	1.53	2.46	SR 631 (Wayside Road)	Hazelwood Drive	SR 682 (Big A School Road)	
Pittsylvania	0.55	0.89	Franklin County line	Stalion Road	SR 969 (Sago Road)	
Powhatan	0.37	0.60	US 522 (Maidens Road)	Fariss Road	SR 615 (Three Bridge Lane)	
Prince Edward	3.62	5.83	SR 609 (Peaks Road)	Chinquapin Road	SR 608 (First Rock Road)	
Prince George	0.17	0.27	Dead End	Chadwick Lane	SR 648 (Clary Road)	
Prince William	1.60	2.57	SR 653 (Parkgate Drive)	Flory Road Hooe Road	SR 619 (Bristow Road)	Gap between segments ending at different points along SR 709
Pulaski	1.34	2.16	Dead End	Brown Road	SR 658 (Delton Road)	
Rappahannock	0.70	1.13	US 211 (Lee Highway)	Atkins Road	Dead End	
Richmond	2.12	3.41	SR 614 (Beaver Dam Road)	Forest Road	SR 642 (Sharps Road)	
Roanoke	1.92	3.09	Vinton town limits	Mountain View Road	Bedford County line	
Rockbridge	2.00	3.22	SR 646 (Big Hill Road)	Honey Hollow Road	Dead End	
Rockingham	2.17	3.49	SR 996 (McGaheysville Road)	Power Dam Road	SR 650 (Power Dam Road/Three Springs Road)	
Russell	6.05	9.74	SR 653 (Lewis Creek Road)	Hubbard Town Road Romans Ridge Road	Dead End	Gap between segments ending at different points along SR 645
Scott	0.30	0.48	Dead End	Unnamed road	SR 753	
Shenandoah	4.49	7.23	SR 747 (Riverview Drive)	Johnson Road Hanns Lane Mount Olive Road	Dead End	Gap between segments ending at different points along SR 650 Gap between segments ending at different points along US 11
Smyth	0.20	0.32	SR 605 (Wet Springs Road)	Carriage Road	SR 645 (Shadowwood Road)	
Southampton	7.57	12.18	SR 653 (Carys Bridge Road)	Indian Town Road	US 58 Bus/SR 35	
Spotsylvania	0.35	0.56	Orange County line	Tatum Road Houston Lane	Dead End	
Stafford	4.66	7.50	SR 616 (Poplar Road)	Kellogg Mill Road	Dead End	
Surry	0.35	0.56	Dead End	Gravel Pit Drive	SR 626 (Holybush Road)	
Sussex	1.90	3.06	SR 626 (Beef Steak Road)	Lobbs Shop Road	SR 40 (Main Street)	
Tazewell	4.21	6.78	US 19	T R Barrett Road	SR 643 (Mud Fork Road)	
Washington	0.20	0.32	SR 609 (Hillman Highway)	Aspen Street	SR 737 (College Drive)	
Westmoreland	0.43	0.69	SR 621 (Nomini Grove Road)	Saint Pauls Road	SR 3 (Kings Highway)	
Wise	6.95	11.18	US 58 Alt	Unnamed road	SR 650 (Sandy Ridge Road)	
Wythe	4.70	7.56	SR 669	Spraker Road Farmview Road	SR 690/SR 707	
York	0.40	0.64	Dead End	Ilex Drive	SR 621 (Dare Road)	
