= Virginia State Route 731 =

Secondary route designation

State Route 731

Route information
- Maintained by VDOT

Location
- Country: United States
- State: Virginia

Highway system
- Virginia Routes; Interstate; US; Primary; Secondary; Byways; History; HOT lanes

State Route 731 (SR 731) in the U.S. state of Virginia is a secondary route designation applied to multiple discontinuous road segments among the many counties. The list below describes the sections in each county that are designated SR 731.

== List ==
County	Length (mi)	Length (km)	From	Via	To	Notes
Accomack	1.87	3.01	SR 639 (Phillips Drive)	Texaco Town Road Forest Street	SR 1610 (Caroline Avenue)	
Albemarle	2.05	3.30	US 250 (Richmond Road)	Keswick Drive Keswick Road	SR 22 (Louisa Road)	
Amherst	1.01	1.63	SR 739 (Boxwood Farm Road)	Zane Snead Drive	Dead End	
Augusta	7.97	12.83	SR 42 (Scenic Highway)	Moscow Loop Natural Chimneys Road Emmanuel Church Road	Rockingham County line	Gap between segments ending at different points along SR 730
Bedford	10.10	16.25	SR 122 (Moneta Road)	Chestnut Fork Road Gladdy Branch Road Dowdy Crossing Amos Bridge Road	SR 43 (Dearing Ford Road)	Gap between segments ending at different points along SR 732 Gap between segments ending at different points along SR 727 Gap between segments ending at different points along SR 626
Botetourt	0.55	0.89	Dead End	Leffel Lane	SR 809 (Salisbury Road)	
Campbell	1.40	2.25	SR 604 (Red Oak School Road)	Manley Branch Road	SR 646 (Spring Mill Road)	
Carroll	1.35	2.17	SR 722 (Cranberry Road)	Timberline Road	SR 887 (Glendale Road)	
Chesterfield	0.50	0.80	Dead End	Russwood Road	SR 628 (Hickory Road)	
Dinwiddie	0.42	0.68	SR 611 (Wilkinson Road)	Ruth Hill Road	Dead End	
Fairfax	0.30	0.48	SR 603 (River Bend Road)	Jackson Lane	Dead End	
Fauquier	4.24	6.82	SR 732 (Ramey Road)	Ashville Road Cobbler Mountain Road Unnamed road	SR 55 (John Marshall Highway)	
Franklin	2.15	3.46	Dead End	Dugwell Road	SR 735 (Retreat Road)	
Frederick	1.70	2.74	SR 654 (Cedar Grove Road)	Cattail Road	SR 608 (Hunting Ridge Road)	
Halifax	0.30	0.48	US 58 (Bill Tuck Highway)	Pools Mill Trail	Dead End	
Hanover	1.65	2.66	SR 688 (Doswell Road)	Bullfield Road	Dead End	
Henry	0.05	0.08	SR 732 (Brandon Road)	Longview Drive	Dead End	
James City	0.14	0.23	SR 732 (Braddock Road)	Anthony Wayne Road	SR 717 (Druid Court)	
Loudoun	3.50	5.63	SR 733 (Mountville Road)	Hibbs Bridge Road Watermill Road	SR 728 (North Fork Road)	Gap between segments ending at different points along SR 734
Louisa	0.60	0.97	SR 669 (Ellisville Drive)	Bannister Town Road	Dead End	
Mecklenburg	1.40	2.25	SR 722 (Carters Point Road)	Gravel Hill Road	SR 732 (Buffalo Springs Road)	
Montgomery	0.08	0.13	Christiansburg town limits	Mill Lane	Christiansburg town limits	
Pittsylvania	1.10	1.77	SR 638 (Harbor Drive)	Hundley Drive	Dead End	
Prince George	0.16	0.26	Cul-de-Sac	Quality Drive	SR 730	
Prince William	0.65	1.05	SR 601 (Waterfall Road)	Mount Atlas Lane	Dead End	
Pulaski	1.94	3.12	SR 100	Cloyds Mountain Road	Cul-de-Sac	
Roanoke	0.63	1.01	SR 668 (Yellow Mountain Road)	Bryan Road Lewis Road Rockingham Boulevard	SR 666 (Bandy Road)	
Rockbridge	7.47	12.02	SR 602 (Walkers Creek Road)	Unnamed road	SR 602	Gap between segments ending at different points along SR 724
Rockingham	6.86	11.04	Augusta County line	Thorny Branch Road Community Center Road Daniel Cupp Road Fulton School Road Kerns Road Morris Pottery Road	Dead End	Gap between segments ending at different points along SR 257
Scott	0.60	0.97	Dead End	Unnamed road Meadow Lark Street	SR 1114 (Chapel Street)	
Shenandoah	0.90	1.45	SR 730	Lutz Hollow Road	SR 698 (Turkey Knob Road)	
Stafford	0.15	0.24	Dead End	Hampton Drive	SR 730 (Lake Shore Drive)	
Tazewell	0.07	0.11	Dead End	Herndon Street	US 19	
Washington	4.13	6.65	SR 91 (Monroe Road)	Bucks Bridge Road Barrtown Road	SR 605 (Widener Valley Road)	
Wise	0.03	0.05	SR 713 (Riverside Drive)	Spruce Street	Dead End	
York	0.14	0.23	SR 716 (Hubbard Lane)	Edale Avenue	SR 727 (Nelson Drive)	
