= Virginia State Route 759 =

Secondary route designation

State Route 759

Route information
- Maintained by VDOT

Location
- Country: United States
- State: Virginia

Highway system
- Virginia Routes; Interstate; US; Primary; Secondary; Byways; History; HOT lanes

State Route 759 (SR 759) in the U.S. state of Virginia is a secondary route designation applied to multiple discontinuous road segments among the many counties. The list below describes the sections in each county that are designated SR 759.

== List ==
| County | Length (mi) | Length (km) | From | Via | To | Notes |
|---|---|---|---|---|---|---|
| Accomack | 0.30 | 0.48 | Dead End | Killmon Lane | SR 631 (Hacksneck Road) | |
| Albemarle | 0.60 | 0.97 | SR 616 (Union Mill Road) | Three Chopt Road | Fluvanna County line | |
| Amherst | 0.80 | 1.29 | SR 712 (Pierces Mill Road) | Brayton Ridge Road | Dead End | |
| Augusta | 2.20 | 3.54 | SR 728 (Stove Shop Road) | Oak Hill School | SR 761 (Bluff Mountain Road) | Gap between segments ending at different points along SR 756 |
| Bedford | 2.25 | 3.62 | SR 619 (Jordantown Road) | Jeters Mill Road | Dead End | |
| Botetourt | 0.19 | 0.31 | SR 615 (Craig Creek Road) | Willey Road | Dead End | |
| Campbell | 0.09 | 0.14 | US 501 (Brookneal Highway) | Grass Street | SR 803 (Oak Street) | |
| Carroll | 0.84 | 1.35 | SR 911 (Robinson Drive) | Acorn Lane Carrollwood Drive | US 58 (Carrollton Pike) | |
| Chesterfield | 0.87 | 1.40 | SR 2036 (Sunfield Drive) | Stigall Drive | SR 604 (Genito Road) | |
| Dinwiddie | 0.57 | 0.92 | Dead End | Gunn Road | SR 650 (Lew Jones Road) | |
| Fairfax | 0.45 | 0.72 | Dead End | Byrneley Lane | SR 617 (Backlick Road) | |
| Fauquier | 0.44 | 0.71 | US 50 (John S Mosby Highway) | Federal Street | US 50 (John S Mosby Highway) | |
| Franklin | 1.38 | 2.22 | SR 608 (Fork Mountain Road) | Rufus Road | SR 718 (Crooked Oak Road) | |
| Frederick | 1.40 | 2.25 | SR 627 (Chapel Road) | Buffalo Marsh Road | SR 638 (Clark Road) | |
| Halifax | 1.68 | 2.70 | US 501 (Huell Matthews Highway) | Horseshoe Trail | Dead End | |
| Hanover | 0.25 | 0.40 | US 1 (Washington Highway) | Pleasants Circle | Dead End | |
| Henry | 1.89 | 3.04 | Dead End | Evergreen Drive | US 58 (A L Philpott Highway) | |
| James City | 0.55 | 0.89 | US 60 (Richmond Road) | Cokes Lane | Dead End | |
| Loudoun | 0.50 | 0.80 | SR 626 (Foggy Bottom Road) | Hollow Oak Road | SR 831 (Yellow Schoolhouse Road) | |
| Louisa | 0.34 | 0.55 | US 250 (Three Notch Road) | Rollins Lane | Dead End | |
| Mecklenburg | 1.50 | 2.41 | US 58 | Browntown Road | Dead End | |
| Pittsylvania | 0.85 | 1.37 | Dead End | Childress Road | SR 62 | |
| Prince William | 0.37 | 0.60 | SR 638 (Colchester Road) | Forest Lane | Dead End | |
| Pulaski | 0.28 | 0.45 | SR 100 (Clebone Road) | C V Jackson Road | Dead End | |
| Roanoke | 0.20 | 0.32 | SR 752 (Old Bent Mountain Road) | Berganblick Lane | Dead End | |
| Rockbridge | 5.14 | 8.27 | Dead End | Unnamed road Hopper Creek Road Arnolds Valley Road | SR 130 (Wert Faulkner Highway) | |
| Rockingham | 3.64 | 5.86 | Elkton town limits | Newtown Road Fox Mountain Road Naked Creek Road | Page County line | |
| Scott | 1.50 | 2.41 | Dead End | Fugate Hollow Lane Gouldmans Branch Lane | US 58 (Bristol Highway) | |
| Shenandoah | 0.30 | 0.48 | Dead End | Stillhouse Road | SR 621 (Fairmont Lane) | |
| Spotsylvania | 0.73 | 1.17 | FR-163 (Mallard Road) | Orrock Lane | Caroline County line | |
| Stafford | 0.37 | 0.60 | Cul-de-Sac | Kelsey Road | SR 630 (Courthouse Road) | |
| Washington | 1.10 | 1.77 | Tennessee state line | Horizon Drive Drake Road | SR 674 (Denton Valley Road) | |
| Wise | 0.23 | 0.37 | SR 636 (Dotson Creek Road) | Unnamed road | Dead End | |
| York | 0.16 | 0.26 | Dead End | Cherry Point Drive | SR 758 (Cedar Point Crescent) | |
