= Virginia State Route 700 =

Secondary route designation

State Route 700

Route information
- Maintained by VDOT

Location
- Country: United States
- State: Virginia

Highway system
- Virginia Routes; Interstate; US; Primary; Secondary; Byways; History; HOT lanes

State Route 700 (SR 700) in the U.S. state of Virginia is a secondary route designation applied to multiple discontinuous road segments among the many counties. The list below describes the sections in each county that are designated SR 700.

== List ==
County	Length (mi)	Length (km)	From	Via	To	Notes
Accomack	1.50	2.41	SR 698 (Marsh Market Road)	Messongo Road	SR 701 (Wessels Farm Road)	
Albemarle	0.40	0.64	Dead End	Watts Farm Road	SR 600 (Watts Passage)	
Alleghany	0.67	1.08	SR 778 (Dressler Drive)	Evergreen Road	SR 778 (Dressler Drive)	
Amelia	0.30	0.48	Dead End	Harris Street	SR 605 (Wayside Avenue)	
Amherst	0.90	1.45	SR 662 (Geddes Mountain Road)	Jeffersons Trail	Dead End	
Appomattox	1.80	2.90	SR 675 (Cedar Bend Road)	Trent Hatchery Road Cardinal Lane	Dead End	
Augusta	3.30	5.31	SR 876 (Mich Barn Road)	Shirey Road Bowman Springs Road	SR 695 (Sugar Loaf Road)	
Bath	0.23	0.37	Dead End	Carloover Village Drive	SR 699 (Carloover Lane)	
Bedford	0.90	1.45	Dead End	Bee Hollow Road	SR 619 (Jordantown Road)	
Botetourt	0.28	0.45	Dead End	Simmons Lane	US 220 (Botetourt Road)	
Brunswick	1.15	1.85	Dead End	Milas Drive	SR 670 (Western Mill Road)	
Buchanan	5.24	8.43	US 460	Unnamed road Thomas Mountain Road Unnamed road	Kentucky state line	
Buckingham	0.45	0.72	SR 20 (Constitution Route)	Wood Yard Road	SR 631 (Buffalo Road)	
Campbell	2.39	3.85	SR 696 (Marysville Road/Hells Bend Road)	Marysville Road	SR 633 (Goat Island Road)	
Caroline	0.50	0.80	Dead End	Mount Airey Road	SR 658 (Jericho Road)	
Carroll	4.80	7.72	SR 620 (Lambsburg Road)	Blue Ridge School Road Misty Trail Road Harrison Road Heritage Road	SR 711 (Sandy Level Road)	Gap between segments ending at different points along SR 683
Charlotte	1.40	2.25	Dead End	Hamlet Road	SR 727 (Red House Road)	
Chesterfield	0.21	0.34	Dead End	Shawonodasee Road	SR 604 (Courthouse Road)	
Clarke	1.01	1.63	Dead End	Jack Enders Boulevard	SR 7 Bus	
Culpeper	0.16	0.26	SR 663 (Stevensburg Road)	Mount Dumpling Road	SR 669 (Carrico Mills Road)	
Cumberland	0.70	1.13	Dead End	Mount Elba Road	SR 690 (Columbia Road)	
Dickenson	0.97	1.56	SR 607/SR 619	Big Smith Ridge Road	Dead End	
Dinwiddie	3.42	5.50	Dead End	Boze Road Hawkins Road	SR 622 (Baltimore Road)	
Essex	0.07	0.11	SR 627 (Airport Road)/SR 723	Commerce Road	Dead End	
Fairfax	0.56	0.90	US 29/FR 901	Hunter Road	Dead End	
Fauquier	1.62	2.61	SR 601 (Hopewell Road)	Creels Lane	Dead End	
Floyd	0.37	0.60	Dead End	Simmental Road	SR 729 (Wills Ridge Road)	
Fluvanna	0.35	0.56	Dead End	Wylock Lane	SR 644 (Salem Church Road)	
Franklin	0.80	1.29	SR 692 (Rock Lilly Road)	Kent Road	SR 635 (Bonbrook Mill Road)	
Frederick	0.95	1.53	SR 701 (Old Braddock Road)	Gardners Road	SR 127 (Bloomery Pike)	
Giles	6.67	10.73	US 460 (Virginia Avenue)	Mountain Lake Road	SR 613 (Doe Creek Road)	Former SR 112
Gloucester	0.99	1.59	SR 216 (Guinea Road)	Heywood Lane	Dead End	
Goochland	3.20	5.15	US 250 (Broad Street Road)	Three Chopt Road	US 250 (Broad Street Road)	
Grayson	8.90	14.32	SR 706 (Pennford Road)	Mountain View Road Bethany Road Shady Hill Road Old River Lane	Dead End	
Greensville	0.15	0.24	Dead End	Louis Street	SR 643	
Halifax	0.30	0.48	North Carolina state line	McGees Mill Road	SR 699 (Mount Caramel Road)	
Hanover	0.38	0.61	Dead End	Studley Farms Drive	SR 606 (Studley Road)	
Henry	2.11	3.40	SR 625 (Poplar Fork Road)	Conner Lane	SR 610 (Axton Road)	
Isle of Wight	1.60	2.57	SR 606 (Five Forks Road)	Braswell Drive	SR 600 (Blue Ridge Trail)	
James City	0.21	0.34	Dead End	Brookwood Drive	SR 199	
King and Queen	0.14	0.23	SR 608 (Clancie Road)	Coxs Lane	SR 701 (Airville Road)	
King George	0.20	0.32	Dead End	Saint Stephens Road	SR 648 (Winston Place)	
Lancaster	0.70	1.13	Dead End	Mosquito Beach Lane	SR 641 (Mosquito Point Road)	
Lee	0.04	0.06	Dead End	Bolinskie Drive	US 58 Alt	
Loudoun	2.50	4.02	SR 630 (Unison Road)	Woodtrail Road	SR 719 (Airmont Road)	
Louisa	7.37	11.86	US 522 (Pendelton Road)	Mica Road Johnson Road Haley Drive	Dead End	Gap between segments ending at different points along SR 618
Lunenburg	1.60	2.57	SR 685 (Germantown Road)	Simon Road	SR 683 (Springfield Road)	
Madison	1.65	2.66	Dead End	Wrights Lane	SR 230 (Orange Road)	
Mathews	0.48	0.77	SR 198	Around The Fence Road	Dead End	
Mecklenburg	0.72	1.16	US 15	Turkey Road	Dead End	
Middlesex	0.06	0.10	Dead End	Deerchase Road	SR 629 (Stormont Road)	
Nelson	0.47	0.76	SR 623 (Stage Bridge Road)	Walnut Grove Lane	Dead End	
New Kent	0.28	0.45	SR 155 (Courthouse Road)	Mini Tree Glen Lane	Dead End	
Northampton	0.06	0.10	SR 698 (Adron Street)	Cross Street	SR 1042 (Hadlock Road)	
Northumberland	0.48	0.77	Dead End	Sutton Avenue	SR 657 (Fleeton Road)	
Nottoway	0.15	0.24	SR 676 (Fourth Street)	Gumm Street	SR 637 (Sixth Street)	
Orange	4.40	7.08	SR 632 (Montebello Road)	Trimmers Road	SR 615 (Rapidan Road)	
Page	0.37	0.60	US 340	Runyon Road	Dead End	
Patrick	2.95	4.75	SR 631 (Moorefield Store Road)	Moorefield Store Road Nettle Ridge Loop	US 58 (Jeb Stuart Highway)	
Pittsylvania	1.40	2.25	Henry County line	East Maple Drive	SR 855 (Cascade Mill Road)	
Prince Edward	1.50	2.41	SR 665 (Darlington Heights Road)	Moore Road	SR 658 (Five Forks Road)	
Prince William	0.37	0.60	SR 1237 (Davis Street)	Woodbridge Street	SR 741 (G Street)	
Pulaski	0.16	0.26	SR 703 (Ridge Road)	Fairlawn Avenue	SR 114 (Peppers Ferry Boulevard)	
Richmond	0.33	0.53	US 360 (Richmond Road)	Selftown Road	Dead End	
Roanoke	0.75	1.21	Dead End	Forest Acre Trail	SR 864 (Bradshaw Road)	
Rockbridge	5.59	9.00	Dead End	Unnamed road	Dead End	Gap between segments ending at different points along SR 608
Rockingham	0.27	0.43	Dead End	Trailer Park Road	SR 826 (Criders Road)	
Russell	1.98	3.19	SR 628 (Counts Road)	Eagles Nest Road	SR 615 (Gravel Lick Road)	
Scott	2.70	4.35	SR 693 (Eaton Hill Road)	Fowlers Branch Road Sled Creek Lane	SR 689 (Foggy Bottom Lane)	Gap between segments ending at different points along SR 697
Shenandoah	0.90	1.45	US 11 (Old Valley Pike)	Old Bethal Road	Dead End	
Smyth	0.52	0.84	Marion town limits	Old Lake Road	SR 617 (Walkers Creek Road)	
Southampton	0.10	0.16	SR 615 (Hicksford Road)	Hicks Ford Road	Dead End	
Spotsylvania	0.20	0.32	US 17 Bus	Beulah Salisbury Drive	Dead End	
Stafford	2.16	3.48	SR 1706 (Plantation Drive)	Litchfield Boulevard McWhirt Loop International Parkway	Cul-de-Sac	Gap between SR 1968 and US 17
Surry	0.27	0.43	SR 31 (Rolfe Highway)	Rolfe Court	SR 31 (Rolfe Highway)	
Sussex	0.30	0.48	US 460	George Town Road	SR 615	
Tazewell	0.24	0.39	SR 644 (Abbs Valley Road)	Spring Street	Dead End	
Warren	0.36	0.58	Dead End	Figgins Road	SR 677 (Catlett Mountain Road)	
Washington	31.40	50.53	US 58 (Gate City Highway)	Rich Valley Road Benhams Road Rich Valley Road	SR 745 (Old Saltworks Road)	Formerly SR 77 Gap between segments ending at different points along SR 775
Westmoreland	1.00	1.61	Dead End	Pine Road Calais Road	SR 618 (Drum Bay Road)	
Wise	0.71	1.14	Dead End	Unnamed road Boggs Hollow Road	SR 671 (South Fork Road)	
Wythe	1.30	2.09	US 52 (Fort Chiswell Road)	Brown Town Road	Dead End	
York	0.11	0.18	Dead End	Sylvia Drive	Dead End	
