= Virginia State Route 730 =

Secondary route designation

State Route 730

Route information
- Maintained by VDOT

Location
- Country: United States
- State: Virginia

Highway system
- Virginia Routes; Interstate; US; Primary; Secondary; Byways; History; HOT lanes

State Route 730 (SR 730) in the U.S. state of Virginia is a secondary route designation applied to multiple discontinuous road segments among the many counties. The list below describes the sections in each county that are designated SR 730.

== List ==
County	Length (mi)	Length (km)	From	Via	To	Notes
Accomack	0.83	1.34	SR 689 (Mappsville Road)	Pierce Taylor Road	Dead End	
Albemarle	0.30	0.48	SR 731 (Keswick Drive)	East Keswick Drive	Dead End	
Amherst	1.55	2.49	SR 705 (Mount Sinai Road)	Oak Grove Drive	US 29 Bus/SR 678	
Augusta	11.34	18.25	SR 728 (Stover Shop Road)	Stribling Springs Road Stokesville Road North River Road	Rockingham County line	
Bedford	0.60	0.97	SR 732 (Headens Bridge Road)	Dumpling Mountain Road	Dead End	
Botetourt	0.74	1.19	SR 635 (Timber Ridge Road)	Kyles Mill Road	Dead End	
Campbell	0.20	0.32	SR 646 (Morris Church Road)	Joy Road	SR 601 (Juniper Cliff Road)	
Carroll	0.35	0.56	US 58 (Carrollton Pike)	Bee Line Drive	SR 887 (Glendale Road)	
Chesterfield	1.29	2.08	SR 655 (Beach Road)	Baldwin Creek Road	US 360 (Hull Street Road)	
Dinwiddie	0.28	0.45	US 460 (Cox Road)	Williams Road	Dead End	
Fairfax	0.23	0.37	Dead End	Carrico Drive	SR 236/FR-781	
Fauquier	3.20	5.15	SR 635 (Hume Road)	Stillhouse Road	SR 688 (Leeds Manor Road)	
Franklin	1.63	2.62	SR 735 (Retreat Road)	Dans Road	SR 693 (Green Level Road)	
Frederick	0.90	1.45	SR 677 (Old Baltimore Road)	Babbs Mountain Road	SR 654 (Cedar Grove Road)	
Halifax	4.64	7.47	US 58 (Bill Tuck Highway)	Ramble Road	SR 601 (Bucksheal Road)	
Hanover	0.70	1.13	Dead End	Gordons Lane	US 33 (Mountain Road)	
Henry	0.10	0.16	Martinsville city limits	Greyson Street	Martinsville city limits	
James City	0.28	0.45	SR 742 (Old News Road)	Jesters Lane	Dead End	
Loudoun	1.80	2.90	SR 734 (Snickersville Turnpike)	Colchester Road	SR 630 (JEB Stuart Road)	
Louisa	0.40	0.64	US 33/SR 22 (Louisa Road)	Range Road	Dead End	
Mecklenburg	3.02	4.86	Dead End	Buffalo Church Road Bull Road Kingswood Road	Dead End	
Montgomery	0.25	0.40	SR 624 (Mount Tabor Road)	County Acres Road	Dead End	
Page	1.00	1.61	Shenandoah County line	Unnamed road	Shenandoah County line	
Pittsylvania	5.30	8.53	Danville city limits	Eagle Springs Road Wilkerson Road Countryside Drive	SR 713 (Rock Springs Road)	
Prince George	1.41	2.27	SR 630	Chudoba Parkway	Cul-de-Sac	
Prince William	0.73	1.17	US 1 (Jefferson Davis Highway)	Inn Street	Dead End	
Pulaski	0.20	0.32	SR 649 (Thaxton Road)	Virginia Heights Drive	Dead End	
Roanoke	0.20	0.32	Dead End	Cowman Road	SR 747 (Goodman Road)	
Rockbridge	0.90	1.45	SR 731	Bellevue Lane	SR 726	
Rockingham	1.30	2.09	SR 731 (Community Center Road/Thorny Branch Road)	Community Center Road	Augusta County line	
Scott	0.60	0.97	SR 1112 (McNut Street)	Dogwood Street	SR 735 (Boone Street)	
Shenandoah	12.98	20.89	SR 767 (Quicksburg Road)	Unnamed road Caverns Road Unnamed road	SR 675 (Stoney Creek Road)	Gap between segments ending at different points along SR 698 Gap between segments ending at different points along US 11 Gap between segments ending at different points along the Page County line
Spotsylvania	0.16	0.26	US 1 (Jefferson Davis Highway)	Beauregard Street	US 1 Bus	
Stafford	1.31	2.11	SR 717 (Sussex Street)	Lake Shore Drive	SR 716 (Kent Avenue/Greenwood Drive)	
Tazewell	0.54	0.87	US 460	Baker Hollow Road	Dead End	
Washington	0.90	1.45	Dead End	Blevins Road	SR 604 (Mill Creek Road)	
Wise	0.28	0.45	SR 654	Unnamed road	Dead End	
York	0.19	0.31	SR 727 (Nelson Drive)	Bruton Drive	Cul-de-Sac	
