= Virginia State Route 718 =

Secondary route designation

State Route 718

Route information
- Maintained by VDOT

Location
- Country: United States
- State: Virginia

Highway system
- Virginia Routes; Interstate; US; Primary; Secondary; Byways; History; HOT lanes

State Route 718 (SR 718) in the U.S. state of Virginia is a secondary route designation applied to multiple discontinuous road segments among the many counties. The list below describes the sections in each county that are designated SR 718.

== List ==
County	Length (mi)	Length (km)	From	Via	To	Notes
Accomack	5.09	8.19	SR 620 (Warehouse Road)	Bobtown Road Savageville Road Hill Street	SR 179 (Market Street)	Gap between segments ending at different points along SR 638
Albemarle	0.80	1.29	US 29 (Monacan Trail)	Murrays Lane	Dead End	
Alleghany	0.27	0.43	SR 721	Edgehill Road	SR 702 (Big Cedar Drive)	
Amherst	0.90	1.45	SR 689 (Monitor Road)	Christian Springs Road	Dead End	
Augusta	1.00	1.61	Dead End	Stokesville Road	SR 730 (North River Road)	
Bedford	2.70	4.35	Bedford town limits	Bell Town Road	SR 671 (Timber Ridge Road)	
Botetourt	0.75	1.21	Dead End	Fieldale Road Main Street	Dead End	Gap between segments ending at different points along SR 622
Campbell	1.69	2.72	Dead End	Taylor Ford Road	SR 630 (Chellis Ford Road)	
Carroll	1.30	2.09	Dead End	Wolfpen Ridge Road	SR 815 (Dickey Drive)	
Chesterfield	2.05	3.30	SR 675 (Robious Road)	Old Bon Air Road Rockaway Road	Dead End	
Dinwiddie	0.38	0.61	SR 601 (River Road)	Henshaw Road	Dead End	
Fairfax	1.41	2.27	SR 613 (Beulah Street)	Grovedale Drive Valley View Drive	Cul-de-Sac	Gap between segments ending at different points along SR 644
Fauquier	0.10	0.16	SR 634 (Courtneys Corner Road)	Silver Cloud Road	SR 835 (Morrisville Road)	
Franklin	17.30	27.84	SR 761 (Canton Church Road)	Robin Ridge Road Crooked Oak Road McNeil Mill Road Colonial Turnpike	SR 40 (Franklin Street)	Gap between segments ending at different points along SR 608 Gap between segments ending at different points along US 220 Gap between segments ending at different points along SR 619
Frederick	0.10	0.16	Dead End	Mine Spring Lane	SR 704 (Back Creek Road)	
Halifax	2.50	4.02	SR 707 (Paradise Road)	Snow Hill Road	SR 658 (Cluster Springs Road)	
Hanover	0.70	1.13	Dead End	Watt House Road	SR 156 (Cold Harbor Road)	
Henry	1.28	2.06	Dead End	Pinewood Lane	SR 698 (Crestridge Road)	
James City	0.09	0.14	SR 727 (Oxford Road)	Oxford Circle	Dead End	
Loudoun	1.60	2.57	SR 690 (Hillsboro Road)	Ashbury Church Road	SR 812 (Gaver Mill Road)	
Louisa	1.60	2.57	Goochland County line	Proffits Road	SR 606 (Waltons Store Road)	
Mecklenburg	0.70	1.13	North Carolina state line	Antioch Church Road	SR 826 (Mill Creek Road)	
Montgomery	1.90	3.06	SR 652 (McCoy Road)	Keisters Branch Road	SR 655 (Long Shop Road/Mount Zion Road)	
Pittsylvania	12.31	19.81	SR 41 (Franklin Turnpike)	Dry Fork Road Snakepath Road	SR 640 (Spring Garden Road)	
Prince William	0.13	0.21	SR 652 (Fitzwater Drive)	Nokes Street	Dead End	
Pulaski	0.05	0.08	Dead End	Jackson Avenue	SR 715 (Brandon Road)	
Roanoke	0.19	0.31	Cul-de-Sac	Winterset Drive	SR 632 (Crescent Boulevard)	
Rockbridge	0.07	0.11	Dead End	Unnamed road	SR 635	
Rockingham	3.34	5.38	Harrisonburg city limits	Old Furnace Road Minie Ball Lane	SR 620 (Mountain Valley Road)	Gap between segments ending at different points along SR 717
Scott	1.80	2.90	SR 653 (Mabe Stanleytown Road)	Unnamed road	SR 646	
Shenandoah	0.40	0.64	Dead End	Barb Lane	SR 720 (Crooked Run Road)	
Spotsylvania	0.60	0.97	Dead End	Hebron Church Road	SR 208 (Courthouse Road)	
Stafford	0.10	0.16	SR 716 (Kent Avenue)	Oxford Drive	Dead End	
Tazewell	0.26	0.42	SR 621 (Middle Creek Road)	McCoy Branch Road	Dead End	
Washington	1.09	1.75	SR 858 (Hollyfield Road)	Vails Mill Road	SR 788 (McCann Road/Cornett Road)	
Wise	0.34	0.55	SR 658 (River View Road)	Maple Avenue Spring Street	Dead End	
York	4.34	6.98	US 17 (George Washington Memorial Highway)	Battle Road Old York Hampton Highway Hornsbyville Road Back Creek Road	Dead End	Gap between segments ending at different points along SR 173
