= Virginia State Route 732 =

Secondary route designation

State Route 732

Route information
- Maintained by VDOT

Location
- Country: United States
- State: Virginia

Highway system
- Virginia Routes; Interstate; US; Primary; Secondary; Byways; History; HOT lanes

State Route 732 (SR 732) in the U.S. state of Virginia is a secondary route designation applied to multiple discontinuous road segments among the many counties. The list below describes the sections in each county that are designated SR 732.

== List ==
County	Length (mi)	Length (km)	From	Via	To	Notes
Accomack	2.10	3.38	Dead End	Fairview Road As West Road	SR 614 (Shell Bridge Road)	Gap between segments ending at different points along SR 178
Albemarle	2.90	4.67	SR 53 (Thomas Jefferson Parkway)	Milton Road	SR 729 (Milton Road North)	
Amherst	0.05	0.08	Dead End	Substation Road	US 60 (Richmond Highway)	
Augusta	11.38	18.31	US 250 (Churchville Avenue)	Franksmill Road Union Church Road Middle River Road Roman Road	SR 646 (Fadley Road)	Gap between segments ending at different points along SR 613
Bedford	9.28	14.93	SR 734 (Dundee Road)	Clover Creek Road Headens Bridge Road	SR 24 (Shingle Block Road)	Gap between segments ending at different points along SR 626
Botetourt	0.85	1.37	SR 639 (Wheatland Road)	Loope Lane	Dead End	
Campbell	1.25	2.01	Dead End	Dry Mountain Road	SR 635 (Collins Ferry Road)	
Carroll	1.20	1.93	Grayson County line	Lincoln Road	SR 607 (Fries Road)	
Chesterfield	2.76	4.44	SR 618 (Old Bermuda Hundred Road)	Old Stage Road	SR 615 (Coxendale Road)	
Dinwiddie	0.60	0.97	Dead End	Davis Road	SR 627 (Courthouse Road)	
Fairfax	0.22	0.35	SR 650 (Gallows Road)	Iliff Drive	SR 6319 (Ithaca Street)	
Fauquier	9.98	16.06	SR 688 (Leeds Manor Road)	John Barton Payne Road Tanner Branch Road Dixons Mill Road Ramey Road	FR-17	Gap between a dead end and SR 647 Gap between segments ending at different points along SR 635
Franklin	0.80	1.29	Dead End	Blankenship Road	SR 641 (Callaway Road)	
Frederick	1.82	2.93	SR 622 (Cedar Creek Grade)	Barley Lane	SR 628 (Middle Road)	
Grayson	0.40	0.64	SR 606 (Windmill Lane)	Lincoln Road	Carroll County line	
Halifax	3.60	5.79	SR 602 (Hitesburg Church Road)	Aarons Creek Road	US 58 (Bill Tuck Highway)	
Hanover	0.80	1.29	SR 629 (Piping Tree Ferry Road)	Epps Road	Dead End	
Henry	2.14	3.44	SR 57 (Appalachian Drive)	Brandon Road Longview Drive	SR 728 (Wheeler Avenue)	
James City	0.29	0.47	Dead End	Braddock Road	SR 727 (Oxford Road)	
Loudoun	0.20	0.32	Dead End	Meetinghouse Lane	US 50 (John S Mosby Highway)	
Louisa	0.20	0.32	SR 642 (Old Bickley Town Road/Bickley Road)	Old Bickly Town Road	Dead End	
Mecklenburg	3.20	5.15	US 58	Tabernacle Road Buffalo Springs Road Baffalo Creek Road	Dead End	
Montgomery	0.07	0.11	SR 631 (Brake Road)	Unnamed road	SR 754 (Calloway Street)	
Pittsylvania	5.54	8.92	Danville city limits	Little Creek Road Fall Creek Road Ferguson Road	SR 728 (Hillside Road)	Gap between segments ending at different points along SR 729 Gap between segments ending at different points along SR 726
Prince George	0.87	1.40	SR 731	Quality Way	Cul-de-Sac	
Prince William	0.60	0.97	SR 234/SR 1777	Barrett Drive	Dead End	
Pulaski	0.35	0.56	SR 626 (Hazel Hollow Road)	Young Road	Dead End	
Roanoke	0.15	0.24	SR 691 (Dawnwood Road)	Shaver Road	Dead End	
Rockbridge	1.38	2.22	Dead End	Unnamed road	SR 39 (Maury River Road)	
Rockingham	9.13	14.69	US 33 (Rawley Pike)	Coopers Mountain Road Horeb Church Road Coakley Town Road Bowman Road Eberly Road	SR 42 (John Wayland Highway)	Gap between segments ending at different points along SR 613 Gap between segments ending at different points along SR 752 Gap between segments ending at different points along SR 736 Gap between SR 290 and SR 701
Scott	0.80	1.29	US 23	Unnamed road	SR 707	
Shenandoah	0.70	1.13	US 11 (Old Valley Pike)	Cardinal Road	SR 620 (Smith Creek Road)	
Spotsylvania	0.30	0.48	SR 627 (Gordon Road)	Mallard Point Road	Dead End	
Stafford	0.35	0.56	Dead End	Cedar Lane	SR 630 (Courthouse Road)	
Tazewell	0.20	0.32	SR 831 (Whitney Branch Road)	Denver Avenue Van Hoosier Road	SR 733	
Washington	0.90	1.45	SR 733 (Rush Creek Road)	Confederate Road	SR 605 (Widener Valley Road)	
Wise	0.03	0.05	SR 713 (Riverside Drive)	Walnut Street	Dead End	
York	0.11	0.18	SR 173 (Goodwin Neck Road)	Unnamed road	SR 173 (Goodwin Neck Road)	
