= Virginia State Route 701 =

Secondary route designation

State Route 701

Route information
- Maintained by VDOT

Location
- Country: United States
- State: Virginia

Highway system
- Virginia Routes; Interstate; US; Primary; Secondary; Byways; History; HOT lanes

State Route 701 (SR 701) in the U.S. state of Virginia is a secondary route designation applied to multiple discontinuous road segments among the many counties. The list below describes the sections in each county that are designated SR 701.

== List ==
County	Length (mi)	Length (km)	From	Via	To	Notes
Accomack	6.92	11.14	SR 692 (Savannah Road)	Wessels Farm Road Jenkins Bridge Road Withams Road Bullbeggar Road	SR 709 (Pitts Creek Road)	
Albemarle	0.37	0.60	Dead End	Alberene Church Road	SR 717 (Secretarys Sand Road)	
Alleghany	0.50	0.80	Botetourt County line	Alleghany Avenue Earnest Avenue	US 220 (Market Avenue)	
Amherst	1.01	1.63	SR 671 (Possum Island Road)	Dogwood Drive	SR 670 (Izaak Road)	
Augusta	4.04	6.50	US 11 (Lee Jackson Highway)	Howardsville Road	SR 252 (Middlebrook Road)	
Bedford	1.08	1.74	SR 759 (Jeters Mill Road)	Mountain Valley Road	Dead End	
Botetourt	0.70	1.13	End of State Maintenance	Park Avenue	Alleghany County line	
Campbell	12.60	20.28	SR 699 (Gladys Road)	Lambs Church Road East Ferry Road	US 501 (Brookneal Highway)	Gap between segments ending at different points along SR 696
Carroll	8.09	13.02	SR 698 (Spring Bud Drive/Good Hope Road)	Joy Ranch Road	US 58 (Carrollton Pike)	Gap between segments ending at different points along SR 775
Chesterfield	3.68	5.92	SR 651 (Belmont Road)	Whitepine Road	Huntingcreek Drive	
Dinwiddie	0.60	0.97	Dead End	Quail Hollow Road	SR 610 (Old White Oak Road)	
Fairfax	1.52	2.45	SR 655 (Blake Lane)	Sutton Road Five Oaks Road	Dead End	
Fauquier	0.70	1.13	US 17 (Winchester Road)	Gap Run Road	SR 759 (Federal Street)	
Franklin	1.45	2.33	Dead End	Foggy Ridge Road	SR 775 (Iron Ridge Road)	
Frederick	3.22	5.18	West Virginia state line	Redland Road Old Braddock Road Redland Road Red Oak Road	US 522 (Frederick Pike)	
Halifax	1.90	3.06	SR 711 (Alton Post Office Road)	Mill Pond Road	SR 699 (Wilkins Road)	
Hanover	0.30	0.48	US 301/SR 2 (Hanover Courthouse Road)	Cedarcrest Road	Dead End	
Henry	1.86	2.99	SR 866 (Dale Avenue)	Chadmore Drive Tenth Street Field Street Field Avenue	SR 57 (Appalachian Drive)	
James City	0.05	0.08	SR 703 (Laurel Lane)	Laurel Court	Cul-de-Sac	
Loudoun	0.70	1.13	SR 735 (Black Oak Road)	Otley Road	SR 690 (Silcott Springs Road)	
Louisa	9.30	14.97	SR 655 (Bethany Church Road)	Belle Meade Road Borden Road Ketucy Springs Road Eastham Road	SR 601 (Greenes Corner Road)	Gap between segments ending at different points along SR 618
Mecklenburg	4.98	8.01	SR 49	Irwin Road Wilboourne Road	SR 688 (Skipwith Road)	
Montgomery	0.25	0.40	Dead End	Unnamed road	SR 657 (Merrimac Road)	
Pittsylvania	7.80	12.55	SR 360 (Old Richmond Road)	Slatesville Road	SR 640 (Spring Garden Road)	
Prince William	6.75	10.86	SR 801 (Youngs Drive)	Logmill Road	SR 234 (Sudley Road)	
Pulaski	0.21	0.34	SR 715 (Brandon Road)	Oxford Avenue	SR 695 (Old Peppers Ferry Loop)	
Roanoke	1.92	3.09	Dead End	Bending Oak Drive	SR 620 (Miller Cove Road)	
Rockbridge	1.00	1.61	US 11 (Lee Highway)	Jacobs Ladder Road	SR 671 (Old Farm Road)	
Rockingham	6.95	11.18	Harrisonburg city limits	Pike Church Road Silver Lake Road Cooks Creek Road Mount Clinton Pike Cooks Creek Road	SR 763 (Singers Glen Road)	Gap between segments ending at different points along US 33
Scott	0.44	0.71	US 58	Jayne Hill Circle	US 58	
Shenandoah	2.80	4.51	Dead End	Dellinger Gap Road	SR 611 (Supinlick Ridge Lane)	Gap between segments ending at different points along SR 717
Spotsylvania	0.70	1.13	Dead End	Rumsey Lane	SR 208 (Courthouse Road)	
Stafford	0.10	0.16	SR 700 (International Parkway)	Brandywine Court	Cul-de-Sac	
Washington	0.23	0.37	Tennessee state line	Painter Creek Road	SR 75 (Green Spring Road)	
York	0.35	0.56	SR 660 (Baptist Road)	Spring Road	SR 601 (Boundary Road)	
