= Virginia State Route 728 =

Secondary route designation

State Route 728

Route information
- Maintained by VDOT

Location
- Country: United States
- State: Virginia

Highway system
- Virginia Routes; Interstate; US; Primary; Secondary; Byways; History; HOT lanes

State Route 728 (SR 728) in the U.S. state of Virginia is a secondary route designation applied to multiple discontinuous road segments among the many counties. The list below describes the sections in each county that are designated SR 728.

== List ==
County	Length (mi)	Length (km)	From	Via	To	Notes
Accomack	0.07	0.11	US 13 (Lankford Highway)	Downings Road	Dead End	
Albemarle	3.50	5.63	SR 620 (Rolling Road)	Ed Jones Road	SR 729 (Buck Island Road)	
Amherst	0.55	0.89	SR 604 (Coolwell Drive)	Eastview Drive	Cul-de-Sac	
Augusta	13.44	21.63	US 250 (Hankey Mountain Highway)	Stover Shop Road Hundley Distillery Road Luck Stone Road	SR 742 (Shutterlee Mill Road)	Gap between segments ending at different points along SR 732
Bedford	1.50	2.41	Dead End	School Crossing Road	SR 43 (Dearing Ford Road)	
Botetourt	0.30	0.48	Dead End	Redbud Lane	US 220 (Roanoke Road)	
Campbell	0.30	0.48	Dead End	Pannills Road	SR 633 (Epsons Road)	
Carroll	0.92	1.48	Grayson County line	Bedsaul Road	SR 792 (Tower Road)	
Chesterfield	0.82	1.32	Cul-de-Sac	Corner Rock Road	SR 711 (Robious Road)	
Dinwiddie	0.34	0.55	Dead End	Wingfield Road	SR 665 (Walkers Mill Road)	
Fairfax	0.30	0.48	SR 8475 (Little Ox Road)	Stoney Road	SR 8475 (Little Ox Road)	
Fauquier	2.40	3.86	Dead End	Moss Hollow Road	SR 688 (Leeds Manor Road)	
Franklin	2.05	3.30	SR 693 (Green Level Road)	Leaning Oak Road	SR 739 (Bethlehem Road)	
Frederick	0.92	1.48	SR 645 (Airport Road)	Victory Road	US 50 (Millwood Pike)	
Halifax	0.45	0.72	Dead End	Sams Trail	SR 642 (Liberty Road)	
Hanover	1.20	1.93	SR 614 (Normans Bridge Road)	Hanover Quarter Road	Dead End	
Henry	0.43	0.69	SR 609 (Daniel Creek Road)	Wheeler Avenue	US 220 Bus (Virginia Avenue)	
James City	0.19	0.31	SR 1686 (Red Oak Landing Road)	Raleigh Square Road	SR 31 (Jamestown Road)	
Loudoun	3.42	5.50	SR 611 (Telegraph Springs Road)	North Fork Road	Dead End	
Louisa	0.85	1.37	SR 652 (Kentucky Springs Road)	Busbees Point Road	Dead End	
Mecklenburg	3.31	5.33	SR 49	Union Chapel Road	SR 723 (Shiney Rock Road)	
Montgomery	0.70	1.13	Dead End	Basham Road	SR 615 (Old Pike Road)	
Pittsylvania	3.30	5.31	SR 730 (Countryside Drive)	Hillside Road	SR 729 (Kentuck Road)	
Prince William	0.45	0.72	SR 692 (Lucasville Road)	Hensley Road	Dead End	
Pulaski	0.50	0.80	SR 733 (Lillydell Crossing)	Walker Road	Dead End	
Roanoke	0.46	0.74	SR 721 (Ferguson Valley Road)	Ferguson Drive	Cul-de-Sac	
Rockbridge	1.20	1.93	SR 622	Poor House Road	SR 645 (Valley Pike)	
Rockingham	1.20	1.93	SR 42 (Warm Springs Pike)	Gardner Lane	SR 727 (Spring Creek Road)	
Scott	0.50	0.80	SR 619	Unnamed road	Dead End	
Shenandoah	10.12	16.29	SR 729 (Garber Road)	Unnamed road New Market Depot Road River Road	SR 953 (Plains Mill Road)	Gap between segments ending at different points along SR 614 Gap between segments ending at different points along SR 616
Spotsylvania	0.65	1.05	Dead End	Wheeler Road	SR 650 (Margo Road)	
Stafford	1.31	2.11	SR 611 (Widewater Road)	Flippo Road	Dead End	
Washington	0.95	1.53	Dead End	Creek Junction Road	US 58 (Jeb Stuart Highway)	
Wise	0.55	0.89	SR 729 (Andover Road)	Unnamed road	Dead End	
York	0.25	0.40	SR 716 (Hubbard Lane)	Colonial Avenue	SR 752 (Sheppard Drive)	
