= Virginia State Route 703 =

Secondary route designation

State Route 703

Route information
- Maintained by VDOT

Location
- Country: United States
- State: Virginia

Highway system
- Virginia Routes; Interstate; US; Primary; Secondary; Byways; History; HOT lanes

State Route 703 (SR 703) in the U.S. state of Virginia is a secondary route designation applied to multiple discontinuous road segments among the many counties. The list below describes the sections in each county that are designated SR 703.

== List ==
| County | Length (mi) | Length (km) | From | Via | To | Notes |
|---|---|---|---|---|---|---|
| Accomack | 6.90 | 11.10 | SR 701 (Jenkins Bridge Road) | Withams Road Paige Fisher Road Greta Road | SR 679 (Atlantic Road) | Gap between segments ending at different points along US 13 Gap between segments ending at different points along SR 702 |
| Albemarle | 0.70 | 1.13 | SR 715 (Chestnut Grove Road) | Pocket Lane | Dead End | |
| Alleghany | 1.27 | 2.04 | SR 606 | Airport Drive | Bath County line | |
| Amherst | 0.23 | 0.37 | SR 130 (Elon Road) | Younger Drive | SR 130 (Elon Road) | |
| Augusta | 7.50 | 12.07 | SR 42 (Parkersburg Turnpike) | Hewitt Road Hebron Road Buttermilk Spring Road | Staunton city limits | Gap between segments ending at different points along SR 876 Gap between segments ending at different points along SR 693 |
| Bedford | 0.80 | 1.29 | Dead End | Wingfield Drive | SR 668 (Goode Road) | |
| Botetourt | 0.88 | 1.42 | Dead End | Flat Road | SR 736 (Alleghany Avenue) | |
| Campbell | 2.69 | 4.33 | SR 704 (Seneca Road) | Mohawk Road | SR 761 (Long Island Road) | |
| Carroll | 3.47 | 5.58 | SR 706 (Farmers Market Drive) | Bronco Road Gardner Mill Road | US 58 (West Stuart Drive) | |
| Chesterfield | 0.50 | 0.80 | SR 602 (River Road) | Northwood Drive | Dead End | |
| Dinwiddie | 12.54 | 20.18 | US 1 (Boydton Plank Road) | Carson Road | Prince George County line | Formerly SR 141 |
| Fairfax | 4.07 | 6.55 | US 29 (Lee Highway) | Shreve Road Haycock Road | Dead End | Gap between dead ends |
| Fauquier | 1.27 | 2.04 | Dead End | Enon Church Road | US 17/SR 245 | |
| Franklin | 1.55 | 2.49 | SR 40 (Franklin Street) | Ayers Road | SR 655 (Webster Road) | |
| Frederick | 4.82 | 7.76 | US 50 (Northwestern Pike) | Whitacre Road | SR 701 (Old Braddock Road) | |
| Halifax | 2.22 | 3.57 | US 58 (Philpott Road) | Sandy Beach Road | SR 951 (Confroy Drive) | |
| Hanover | 3.00 | 4.83 | SR 271 (Pouncey Tract Road) | Mile Branch Road South Anna Drive | SR 673 (Howards Mill Road) | Gap between segments ending at different points along SR 271 |
| Henry | 0.85 | 1.37 | SR 57/SR 715 | Ridgewood Road | SR 672 (Bassett Heights Road) | |
| James City | 0.21 | 0.34 | SR 702 (Willow Drive) | Laurel Lane | SR 700 (Brookwood Drive) | |
| Loudoun | 1.40 | 2.25 | SR 662 (Clarkes Gap Road) | Hurley Lane | SR 698 (Old Waterford Road) | |
| Louisa | 1.40 | 2.25 | SR 618 (Fredericks Hall Road) | Spring Road | Dead End | |
| Mecklenburg | 4.08 | 6.57 | Dead End | Sullivan Road Puryears Store Road | SR 677 (Wilkerson Road) | Gap between segments ending at different points along US 58 |
| Montgomery | 0.30 | 0.48 | SR 723 (Lusters Gate Road) | Misty Hill Circle | SR 723 (Lusters Gate Road) | |
| Pittsylvania | 20.25 | 32.59 | SR 844 (Mount Cross Road) | Cross Stitch Road Sunset Drive F C Beverly Road Irish Road Tight Squeeze Road Fairview Road | SR 685 (Chalk Level Road) | Gap between segments ending at different points along SR 882 Gap between segments ending at different points along SR 750 Gap between segments ending at different points along SR 41 |
| Prince George | 0.45 | 0.72 | Dead End | Binford Drive | SR 618 (Hitchcock Road) | |
| Prince William | 1.73 | 2.78 | US 29 (Lee Highway) | Old Carolina Road | SR 625 (Old Carolina Road/Haymarket Drive) | |
| Pulaski | 0.38 | 0.61 | SR 702 (Pulaski Avenue) | Ridge Road | SR 713 (Orchard Road) | |
| Roanoke | 0.16 | 0.26 | SR 636 (Glade Creek Road) | Pioneer Drive | Botetourt County line | |
| Rockbridge | 5.39 | 8.67 | Dead End | Unnamed road | SR 716 (Timber Ridge Road) | |
| Rockingham | 0.25 | 0.40 | Dead End | Funkhouser Road | SR 996 (McGaheysville Road) | |
| Scott | 0.50 | 0.80 | Dead End | Robin Hood Lane | SR 702 (Sherwood Forest Lane) | |
| Shenandoah | 10.44 | 16.80 | SR 717 (Alum Springs Road) | Jerome Road Conicville Road Unnamed road Mount Jackson Road Conicville Road | I-81 | Gap between segments ending at different points along SR 42 Gap between segments ending at different points along SR 614 |
| Spotsylvania | 0.20 | 0.32 | Dead End | Mastin Lane | SR 649 (Seays Road) | |
| Stafford | 0.50 | 0.80 | Dead End | Betts Road | SR 621 (Marlborough Point Road) | |
| Washington | 5.44 | 8.75 | SR 740 (Old Saltworks Road) | Shortsville Road Chestnut Ridge Road | SR 700 (Rich Valley Road) | Gap between segments ending at different points along SR 80 |
| Wise | 0.20 | 0.32 | SR 702 | Unnamed road | SR 613 | |
| York | 0.78 | 1.26 | SR 693 (Wormley Creek Drive) | Artillery Road | SR 693 (Wormley Creek Drive) | |
