= Virginia State Route 694 =

State highway in Virginia, United States

State Route 694

Route information
- Maintained by VDOT

Location
- Country: United States
- State: Virginia

Highway system
- Virginia Routes; Interstate; US; Primary; Secondary; Byways; History; HOT lanes

State Route 694 (SR 694) in the U.S. state of Virginia is a secondary route designation applied to multiple discontinuous road segments among the many counties. The list below describes the sections in each county that are designated SR 694.

== List ==
County	Length (mi)	Length (km)	From	Via	To	Notes
Accomack	3.20	5.15	SR 692 (Chesser Road)	Sand Street Jeruselem Road	US 13 (Lankford Highway)	
Albemarle	1.90	3.06	Dead End	Miller Lake Road	SR 693 (Stillhouse Creek Road)	
Alleghany	0.07	0.11	SR 18 (Potts Creek Road)	Old Mill Road	Dead End	
Amelia	0.80	1.29	SR 616 (Genito Road)	Bland Lane	Dead End	
Amherst	1.00	1.61	SR 665 (Warrick Barn Road)	Warrick Barn Road Central Church Lane	SR 778 (Lowesville Road)	
Appomattox	3.78	6.08	SR 727 (Red House Road)	Robinson Road Central Church Road	SR 604 (Promise Land Road)	Gap between segments ending at different points along SR 727
Augusta	8.36	13.45	SR 712 (Haytie Road)	Virginia Institute Way Mount Tabor Road Stone Branch Road Chestnut Ridge Road Swartzel Shop Road	US 340 (Stuarts Draft Highway)	Gap between segments ending at different points along SR 252 Gap between segments ending at different points along US 11
Bath	2.45	3.94	Dead End	Little Valley Road	Highland County line	
Bedford	2.00	3.22	SR 695 (Goose Creek Valley Road)	Walnut Grove Church Road	Dead End	
Botetourt	0.64	1.03	US 220 (Botetourt Road)	Gala Loop Road Sinking Creek Road	Dead End	Gap between segments ending at different points along SR 622
Brunswick	1.51	2.43	SR 46 (Christanna Highway)	Twin Ponds Road Cattail Road	US 58 Bus/SR 46	
Buchanan	1.00	1.61	Dead End	Mill Creek Road	SR 697 (Knox Creek Road/Cedar Branch Road)	
Buckingham	0.90	1.45	Cumberland County line	Henderson Road	SR 613 (Petersville Church Road)	
Campbell	1.40	2.25	SR 682	Langdon Road	SR 696 (Dearborn Road)	
Caroline	4.00	6.44	SR 651 (Old Dawn Road)	Courtney Road	SR 601 (Edgar Road)	
Carroll	0.70	1.13	SR 753 (Double Cabin Road)	Old Wildcat Trail	Dead End	
Charlotte	0.10	0.16	SR 672 (Midway Road)	Pillow Road	SR 617 (Old Well Road)	
Chesterfield	0.10	0.16	SR 664 (Coalboro Road)	Coalboro Road	SR 655 (Beach Road)	
Craig	0.61	0.98	SR 689	Unnamed road	Dead End	
Culpeper	1.58	2.54	US 15 Bus/US 29 Bus	Ira Hoffman Highway	SR 229 (Rixeyville Road)	
Cumberland	0.60	0.97	SR 672 (Sportslake Road)	Henderson Road	Buckingham County line	
Dickenson	1.10	1.77	SR 626 (Phillips Hollow Road)	Unnamed road	Russell County line	
Dinwiddie	0.70	1.13	Dead End	Old Pine Road	SR 622 (Baltimore Road)	
Essex	0.25	0.40	SR 653 (Tuscarora Road)	Boaters Way	Dead End	
Fairfax	6.42	10.33	SR 7 (Leesburg Pike)	Lewinsville Road Great Falls Street	Falls Church city limits	
Fauquier	3.00	4.83	SR 628 (Blantyre Road)	Old Bust Head Road	SR 674 (Georgetown Road)	
Floyd	0.85	1.37	US 221 (Main Street)	East Oxford Street Newtown Road	SR 693 (Needmore Lane)	
Fluvanna	0.82	1.32	SR 654 (Cloverdale Road)	Deer Lane	Dead End	
Franklin	0.90	1.45	Dead End	House Rock Road	SR 693 (Green Level Road)	
Frederick	3.90	6.28	SR 734 (Sleepy Creek Road)	Dick Ridge Road Cumberland Trail Road Reynolds Road	SR 600 (Frederick Grade)	
Giles	0.50	0.80	SR 615 (Kow Camp Road)	Elder Hollow Road	Dead End	
Gloucester	1.28	2.06	SR 3 (John Clayton Memorial Highway)	Waverley Lane	Dead End	
Goochland	0.48	0.77	Cul-de-Sac	Proffitt Road	SR 621 (Manakin Road)	
Grayson	2.00	3.22	SR 654 (Peach Bottom Road)	Birdsong Road Pine Mountain Road	SR 691 (Pine Mountain Road/Doe Run Road)	
Greensville	1.00	1.61	SR 627 (Brink Road)	Hobbs Road	Dead End	
Halifax	1.55	2.49	US 58/SR 119	Medley Road	Dead End	
Hanover	0.65	1.05	SR 738 (Old Ridge Road)	Breedens Road	US 1 (Washington Highway)	
Henry	3.45	5.55	SR 695 (George Taylor Road)	Wagon Trail Road	SR 692 (Horsepasture Prince Road)	
Highland	0.10	0.16	Bath County line	Little Valley Road	SR 607	
Isle of Wight	0.78	1.26	SR 612 (Outland Drive)	Farmland Road	Dead End	
James City	0.31	0.50	SR 695 (Ware Road)	Lake Drive	SR 31 (Jamestown Road)	
King and Queen	0.24	0.39	SR 609 (New Hope Road)	New Beginning Road	Dead End	
King George	3.80	6.12	SR 3 (Kings Highway)	Lambs Creek Church Road	SR 218 (Caledon Road)	
Lancaster	0.50	0.80	Dead End	Peake Road	SR 630 (Taylors Creek Road)	
Lee	0.10	0.16	Tennessee state line	Unnamed road	US 58	
Loudoun	4.01	6.45	Dead End	John Wolford Road The Narrows Road	Dead End	
Louisa	2.50	4.02	SR 600 (Campbell Road)	Loving Road	SR 615 (Columbia Road)	
Lunenburg	5.85	9.41	SR 623 (Plantersville Road)	Shelton Road Bibleway Road	Dead End	
Madison	0.70	1.13	SR 638 (Hebron Church Road)	Hoffman Chapel Lane	Dead End	
Mathews	0.40	0.64	SR 198	Waverly Lane	Dead End	
Mecklenburg	0.65	1.05	Dead End	Wooton Road	SR 688 (Skipwith Road)	
Middlesex	0.52	0.84	SR 663 (Plainview Road)	Eubank Landing Road	Dead End	
Montgomery	0.72	1.16	Blacksburg town limits	Clay Street	Dead End	
Nelson	0.90	1.45	SR 649 (Lonesome Pine Road)	Naked Mountain Road	Dead End	
Northampton	0.10	0.16	Dead End	Terry Lane	SR 603 (Willis Wharf Road)	
Northumberland	0.20	0.32	SR 604 (Sydnors Millpond Road)	Avalon Lane	SR 636 (Newmans Neck Road/Avalon Lane)	
Nottoway	0.15	0.24	US 460 Bus (Old Nottoway Road)	Three Oaks Road	Dead End	
Orange	0.20	0.32	SR 642 (Madison Run Court/Hicks Lane)	Madison Run Court	Dead End	
Page	0.40	0.64	Dead End	Hawksbill Pines Road	SR 626 (Hawksbill Park Road)	
Patrick	10.43	16.79	US 58 (Jeb Stuart Highway)	Campbell Farm Loop Animal Clinic Road Providence Drive Dogwood Road Hardin Reynolds Road	SR 701 (Stella Road)	Gap between a dead end and US 58
Pittsylvania	6.09	9.80	SR 825 (Carter Lodge Road)	David Giles Lane Dairy View Road Davis Road Woodland Heights Road	Dead End	Gap between segments ending at different points along SR 718 Gap between segments ending at different points along SR 703 Gap between dead ends Gap between segments ending at different points along US 29 Bus
Prince Edward	1.00	1.61	SR 696 (Green Bay Road)	Cheatham Road	US 360	
Prince George	0.40	0.64	SR 645 (River Road)	Irwin Road Juniper Drive	Dead End	
Prince William	0.58	0.93	SR 234 (Dumfries Road)	Coles Drive	SR 234 (Dumfries Road)/SR 688	
Pulaski	0.47	0.76	SR 611	Wurno Road	Dead End	
Richmond	0.19	0.31	SR 635 (Grove Mount Road)	Burnt House Road	Dead End	
Roanoke	7.72	12.42	US 221 (Bent Mountain Road)	Twelve O'Clock Knob Road	Salem city limits	
Rockbridge	0.10	0.16	Dead End	County Line Road	SR 610 (Plank Road)	
Rockingham	0.35	0.56	US 11 (Lee Highway)	Contentment Lane	Dead End	
Russell	1.73	2.78	US 58 Alt	Quarry Road	SR 615 (Red Oak Ridge Road)	
Scott	5.92	9.53	Tennessee state line	Unnamed road New Hurland Church Lane Copperhead Lane	SR 696	Gap between segments ending at different points along SR 618
Shenandoah	5.00	8.05	SR 703 (Conicville Road)	Wolverton Road	Dead End	
Smyth	1.65	2.66	SR 622 (Old Rich Valley Road/Bear Creek Road)	Crawfish Road	Dead End	
Southampton	1.26	2.03	Dead End	Old Lamb Road	SR 653 (Pinopolis Road)	
Spotsylvania	0.85	1.37	SR 3 (Plank Road)	Heatherstone Drive	Dead End	
Stafford	0.36	0.58	SR 1016 (Ficklen Road)	Julian Drive	SR 626 (Leeland Road)	
Tazewell	1.20	1.93	Bluefield town limits	High Street	SR 102	
Washington	6.10	9.82	SR 706 (Rivermont Road)	Greenway Road Stonybrook Road Northridge Road	SR 779 (Hillandale Road)	Gap between segments ending at different points along SR 609
Westmoreland	0.45	0.72	SR 676 (Poor Jack Road)	Willis Place	Dead End	
Wise	0.30	0.48	Dead End	Unnamed road	SR 626	
Wythe	1.00	1.61	SR 94 (Ivanhoe Road)	Slab Town Road	Dead End	
York	0.10	0.16	Dead End	Court Road	SR 634 (Old York Hampton Highway)	
