= Virginia State Route 715 =

Secondary route designation

State Route 715

Route information
- Maintained by VDOT

Location
- Country: United States
- State: Virginia

Highway system
- Virginia Routes; Interstate; US; Primary; Secondary; Byways; History; HOT lanes

State Route 715 (SR 715) in the U.S. state of Virginia is a secondary route designation applied to multiple discontinuous road segments among the many counties. The list below describes the sections in each county that are designated SR 715.

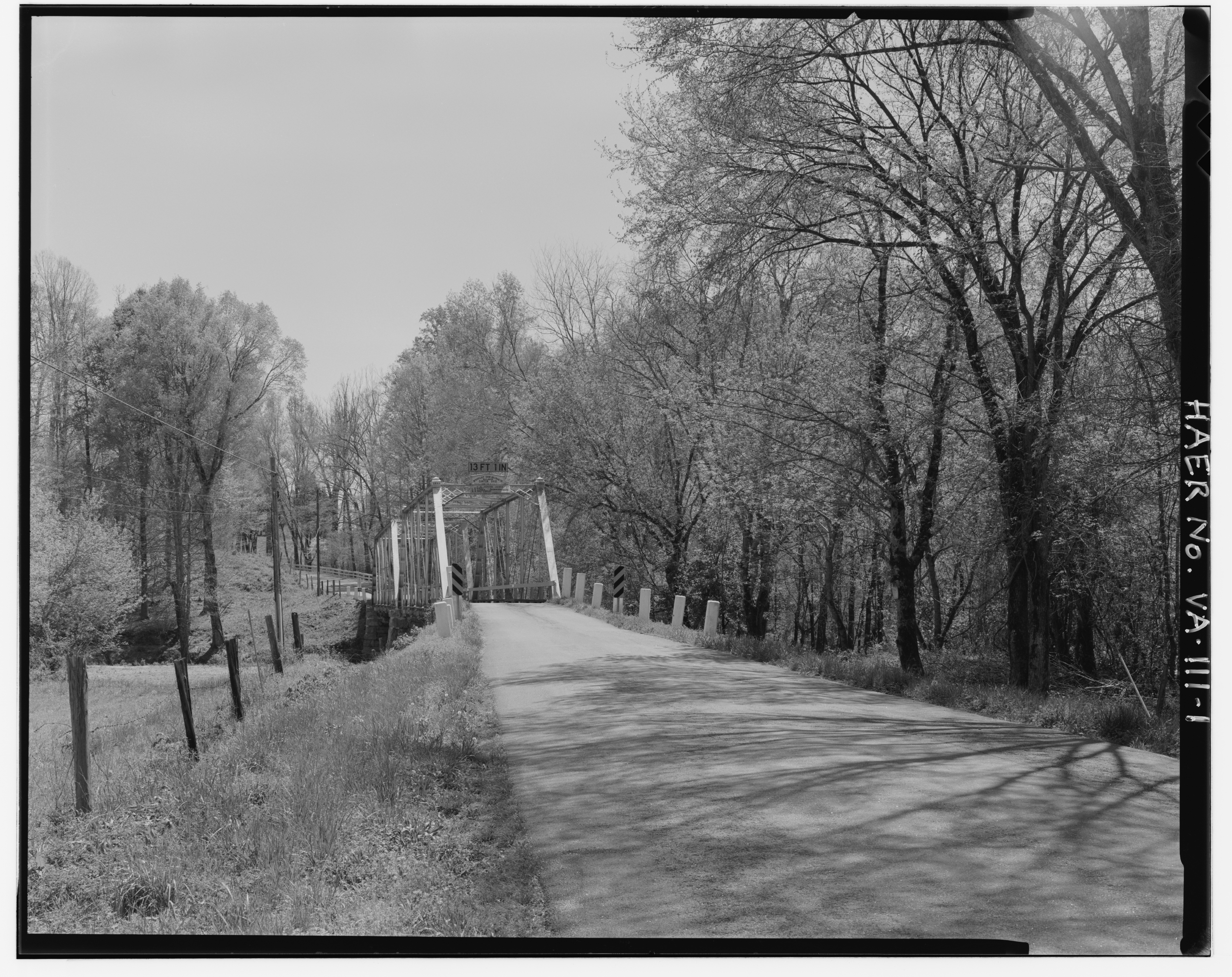
Gholson Bridge, spanning Meherrin River on VA State Route 715 at Lawrenceville, Brunswick County, Virginia

== List ==
County	Length (mi)	Length (km)	From	Via	To	Notes
Accomack	1.90	3.06	SR 789 (Locustville Road)	Logan Road	SR 648 (Daugherty Road)	Gap between segments ending at different points along SR 647
Albemarle	7.67	12.34	SR 723 (Sharon Road)	Chestnut Grove Road Paces Store Road Esmont Road	SR 712 (Plank Road)	Gap between segments ending at different points along SR 6
Alleghany	0.27	0.43	SR 702 (Big Cedar Drive)	Treetop Drive	SR 718 (Edgehill Road)	
Amherst	2.07	3.33	Dead End	Burley Hollow Road	US 60 (Lexington Turnpike)	
Augusta	3.50	5.63	US 250	Braley Pond Road	Dead End	
Bedford	11.07	17.82	SR 43 (Virginia Byway)	Otter Hill Road Claytor Mill Road Junction School Road Krantz Corner Road Merriman Road Timber Ridge Road Lowry Road	US 221 (Forest Road)	Gap between segments ending at different points along SR 714
Botetourt	0.30	0.48	US 11 (Lee Highway)	Montgomery Lane	US 11 (Lee Highway)	
Campbell	0.72	1.16	SR 681 (Viohl Road)	South Timberlake Road	Dead End	
Carroll	2.02	3.25	SR 716 (Red Fox Lane/End of the Line Road)	End of the Line Road	SR 939 (Cockerham Loop)	
Chesterfield	0.31	0.50	SR 633 (Rowlett Road)	Barretta Lane	Cul-de-Sac	
Dinwiddie	1.78	2.86	SR 645 (Wheelers Pond Road)	Patillo Road	SR 613 (White Oak Road)	
Fairfax	0.09	0.14	SR 937 (Douglas Drive)	Clinton Place	Dead End	
Fauquier	3.60	5.79	SR 624 (Crenshaw Road)	Old Carters Mill Road	SR 708 (Young Road)	
Franklin	4.85	7.81	SR 718 (Colonial Turnpike)	Chestnut Mountain Road	SR 646 (Doe Run Road)	
Frederick	0.42	0.68	SR 677 (Saint Clair Road)	Little Mountain Church Road	SR 654 (Cedar Grove Road)	
Halifax	1.65	2.66	Dead End	Red Level Church Road Williams Road	SR 716 (Dryburg Road)	Gap between segments ending at different points along US 360
Hanover	16.43	26.44	SR 610 (Taylors Creek Road)	Clazemont Road Beaver Dam Road	Louisa County line	
Henry	0.08	0.13	SR 716 (Campbell Court)	Campbell Court	SR 57/SR 703	
James City	2.21	3.56	Dead End	North Riverside Drive	SR 610 (Forge Road/Brickyard Road)	
Loudoun	0.60	0.97	Dead End	Neer Lane	SR 751 (Cider Mill Road)	
Louisa	1.10	1.77	SR 601 (Greenes Corner Road)	Bumpass Road	Hanover County line	
Mecklenburg	0.33	0.53	SR 4 (Buggs Island Road)	Rock Church Lane	SR 712 (Palmer Springs Road)	
Montgomery	0.22	0.35	Blacksburg town limits	Murphy Street	Cul-de-Sac	
Pittsylvania	3.16	5.09	SR 360 (Old Richmond Road)	Bennett Circle	SR 360 (Old Richmond Road)	
Prince William	0.05	0.08	Dead End	Waterview Drive	SR 3241 (Hinson Mill Lane)	
Pulaski	1.80	2.90	Dead End	Madison Street Pulaski Avenue Brandon Road	Loop	
Roanoke	1.56	2.51	US 220 (Franklin Road)	Pine Needle Drive	US 220 (Franklin Road)	
Rockbridge	1.64	2.64	US 11 (Lee Highway)	Sunnybrook Road	SR 712 (Decatur Road)	
Rockingham	0.44	0.71	Dead End	Kettle View Road	SR 636 (Runkels Gap Road)	
Scott	1.30	2.09	Dead End	Unnamed road	US 23	
Shenandoah	2.00	3.22	SR 716 (Graveltown Road)	Orchard Road	SR 710 (Pleasant View Road)	
Spotsylvania	0.50	0.80	SR 648 (Block House Road)	Camp Town Road	Dead End	
Stafford	0.14	0.23	SR 713 (Federal Drive)	Duke Avenue	Dead End	
Tazewell	0.38	0.61	SR 631 (Baptist Valley Road)	Rasnake Drive	SR 631 (Baptist Valley Road)	
Washington	1.92	3.09	Dead End	Fisher Hollow Road Blossom Road	US 58 (Jeb Stuart Highway)	
Wise	0.24	0.39	Dead End	Wildcat Drive	SR 83	
York	0.20	0.32	SR 717 (Old Landing Road)	East Branch Road	SR 717 (Old Landing Road)	
