= Virginia State Route 727 =

Secondary route designation

State Route 727

Route information
- Maintained by VDOT

Location
- Country: United States
- State: Virginia

Highway system
- Virginia Routes; Interstate; US; Primary; Secondary; Byways; History; HOT lanes

State Route 727 (SR 727) in the U.S. state of Virginia is a secondary route designation applied to multiple discontinuous road segments among the many counties. The list below describes the sections in each county that are designated SR 727.

== List ==
County	Length (mi)	Length (km)	From	Via	To	Notes
Accomack	0.28	0.45	SR 606 (Harbor Point Road)	Harbor Circle	Dead End	
Albemarle	2.84	4.57	SR 795 (President Road)	Blenheim Road	SR 627 (Carters Mountain Road)	
Amherst	2.15	3.46	SR 130 (Elon Road)	Cheatham Road Pera Road	SR 130 (Elon Road)	
Augusta	2.22	3.57	SR 731 (Emmanuel Church Road)	Wolf Ridge Road Grindstone Road Millers Sawmill Road	Rockingham County line	Gap between segments ending at different points along SR 730
Bedford	4.16	6.69	SR 626 (Smith Mountain Lake Parkway)	Crab Orchard Road	SR 24 (Glenwood Drive)	
Botetourt	0.28	0.45	US 220 (Botetourt Road)	Fork Farm Road	Alleghany County line	
Campbell	1.70	2.74	Dead End	Crows Road	SR 701 (East Ferry Road)	
Carroll	2.73	4.39	Dead End	Farmville Lane Old Quaker Road	SR 815 (Shepherds Place)	Gap between segments ending at different points along SR 97
Chesterfield	0.81	1.30	SR 868 (Grove Road)	Murray Olds Drive Alverser Drive	SR 147 (Huguenot Road)	
Dinwiddie	0.79	1.27	Dead End	Bethune Road	SR 675 (Vaughan Road)	
Fairfax	1.37	2.20	Cul-de-Sac	Fountainhead Regional Park Road	SR 647 (Hampton Road)	
Fauquier	1.30	2.09	Dead End	Hard Scrabble Road	SR 726 (Fiery Run Road)	
Franklin	2.54	4.09	Dead End	Riverbrook Road	Henry County line	
Frederick	0.80	1.29	US 11 (Valley Pike)	Belle Grove Road	Dead End	
Halifax	1.00	1.61	Dead End	North Nichols Ferry Trail	SR 716 (Wolf Trap Road)	
Hanover	0.50	0.80	Dead End	Holly Berry Road	SR 623 (Cedar Lane)	
Henry	0.20	0.32	Franklin County line	Stoneybrook Lane	SR 674 (Philpott Road)	
James City	0.46	0.74	Dead End	Oxford Road	SR 31 (Jamestown Road)	
Loudoun	1.50	2.41	SR 722 (Lincoln Road)	Forest Mills Road	SR 729 (Shelburne Glebe Road)	
Louisa	1.50	2.41	Dead End	Mickie Town Road	SR 635 (Factory Mill Drive)	
Mecklenburg	4.85	7.81	North Carolina state line	Henrico Road	SR 871 (Sandy Fork Road)	Gap between segments ending at different points along SR 728
Montgomery	0.17	0.27	Dead End	Fox Hollow Road	SR 603 (North Fork Road)	
Pittsylvania	2.40	3.86	SR 41 (Franklin Turnpike)	Afton Road	SR 745 (Mount View Road)	
Prince William	0.31	0.50	SR 234 (Dumfries Road)	Olympic Drive	Dead End	
Pulaski	0.90	1.45	SR 670 (Lizzie Gunn Road)	Hodge Hollow Road	Dead End	
Roanoke	1.70	2.74	SR 622 (Bradshaw Road)	Berrybrook Drive	Dead End	
Rockbridge	7.20	11.59	SR 602 (Turkey Hill Road)	Unnamed road	SR 252 (Brownsburg Turnpike)	Gap between dead ends Gap between segments ending at different points along SR 39 Gap between segments ending at different points along SR 712
Rockingham	7.43	11.96	Augusta County line	Sangersville Road Spring Creek Road Airport Road	US 11 (Lee Highway)	Gap between segments ending at different points along SR 613 Gap between segments ending at different points along SR 42
Scott	0.56	0.90	US 23	Unnamed road	US 23	
Shenandoah	0.90	1.45	SR 42 (Senedo Road)	Solomons Church Road	SR 716 (Graveltown Road)	
Spotsylvania	0.20	0.32	Dead End	Rosser Street	US 17 Bus/SR 2 (Tidewater Trail)	
Stafford	0.70	1.13	Dead End	Monroe Farm Road	SR 655 (Holly Corner Road)	
Tazewell	4.40	7.08	Bland County line	West End Road	SR 623 (Burkes Garden Road)	
Washington	0.60	0.97	Tennessee state line	Dry Branch Road	SR 726 (Chestnut Mountain Road)	
Wise	0.75	1.21	SR 644 (Pole Bridge Road)	Unnamed road	Dead End	
York	0.44	0.71	Dead End	Nelson Drive	SR 752 (Sheppard Drive)	
