= Virginia State Route 696 =

State highway in Virginia, United States

State Route 696

Route information
- Maintained by VDOT

Location
- Country: United States
- State: Virginia

Highway system
- Virginia Routes; Interstate; US; Primary; Secondary; Byways; History; HOT lanes

State Route 696 (SR 696) in the U.S. state of Virginia is a secondary route designation applied to multiple discontinuous road segments among the many counties. The list below describes the sections in each county that are designated SR 696.

== List ==
County	Length (mi)	Length (km)	From	Via	To	Notes
Accomack	1.92	3.09	US 13/SR 180	Keller Fair Road	SR 626 (Race Track Road)	
Albemarle	2.90	4.67	SR 692 (Plank Road)	Edge Valley Road	SR 710 (Taylors Gap Road)	
Alleghany	3.27	5.26	SR 1101 (Winterberry Avenue)	Selma Low Moor Road	US 60 Bus	
Amelia	1.00	1.61	SR 153 (Military Road)	Locust Dale Lane	Dead End	
Amherst	1.00	1.61	SR 715 (Burley Hollow Road)	Shady Mountain Road	Dead End	
Appomattox	0.55	0.89	SR 601 (Forest Chapel Road)	Crane Creek Road	Dead End	
Augusta	5.42	8.72	US 11 (Lee Highway)	Sydney Gap Road Flint Hill Road Burkes Mill Road Stonewall Road Coffman Road Crafton Hill Road Gratton Hill Road	Rockingham County line	Gap between segments ending at different points along SR 646 Gap between segments ending at different points along SR 690
Bath	0.31	0.50	Dead End	Mountain Avenue	SR 611 (College Lane)	
Bedford	0.60	0.97	SR 617 (Pike Road)	Crouch Road	SR 695 (Goose Creek Valley Road)	
Botetourt	2.64	4.25	SR 622 (Prices Bluff Road)	Locust Bottom Road Buhrman Road	Dead End	
Brunswick	1.20	1.93	US 58 (Governor Harrison Parkway)	Rogers Road	Dead End	
Buchanan	0.35	0.56	SR 730 (Funeral Home Road0	Funeral Home Road	US 460	
Buckingham	1.63	2.62	SR 613 (Petersville Church Road)	Tatum Road	Cumberland County line	
Campbell	17.00	27.36	Dead End	Hells Bend Road Marysville Road Dearborn Road	SR 24 (Colonial Highway)	Gap between segments ending at different points along US 29 (Wards Road)
Caroline	0.30	0.48	SR 639 (Ladysmith Road)	Parkers Lane	Dead End	
Carroll	2.95	4.75	North Carolina state line	Holly Grove Road	SR 620 (Lambsburg Road)	
Charlotte	0.25	0.40	SR 665 (Harvey Road)	Corner Road	SR 47 (Thomas Jefferson Highway)	
Chesterfield	0.14	0.23	SR 746 (Ruffin Mill Road)	Fox Drive	Dead End	
Craig	0.30	0.48	SR 615 (Craigs Creek Road)	Old Railroad Avenue	Dead End	
Culpeper	0.82	1.32	SR 625 (Mount Zion Church Road)	Carter Lane	Dead End	
Cumberland	2.40	3.86	Buckingham County line	Tatum Road Bonbrook Road	SR 624 (Sugarfork Road)	
Dickenson	0.50	0.80	SR 83	Little Doc Hollow Road	Dead End	
Dinwiddie	1.20	1.93	Dead End	Bourdon Creek Road	SR 687 (Cutbank Road)	
Essex	0.25	0.40	SR 635 (Rose Mount Road)	Richardson Road	Dead End	
Fairfax	1.73	2.78	Vienna town limits	Wolftrap Road	Dead End	Gap between dead ends
Fauquier	1.20	1.93	Dead End	Trapp Branch Road	SR 674 (Georgetown Road)	
Floyd	2.09	3.36	SR 813 (Penn Road)	Valley Drive Penn Avenue	SR 8 (North Locust Street)	
Fluvanna	2.10	3.38	SR 607 (Bybee Road)	Deerfield Road	Louisa County line	
Franklin	0.40	0.64	Dead End	Pleasant Breeze Road	SR 697 (Brick Church Road)	
Frederick	6.15	9.90	SR 127 (Bloomery Pike)	South Timber Ridge Road Unnamed road	West Virginia state line	Gap between segments ending at different points along US 522
Giles	0.08	0.13	Dead End	Post Office Road	SR 660 (Post Office Road)	
Gloucester	0.41	0.66	Dead End	Angus Road	SR 643 (Cuba Road)	
Goochland	0.59	0.95	Dead End	Pacetown Road	SR 615 (Forest Grove Road)	
Grayson	3.60	5.79	Dead End	Boomer Drive Summerfield Road	SR 660 (Carsonville Road)	Gap between segments ending at different points along SR 654
Greensville	0.60	0.97	SR 608	Fields Circle	SR 637	
Halifax	3.21	5.17	North Carolina state line	Henderson Road	US 58 (Philpott Road)	
Hanover	2.87	4.62	SR 657 (Greenwood Church Road)	Winston Road	SR 666 (Blanton Road)	
Henry	3.47	5.58	SR 698 (Crestridge Road)	Skyview Trail	SR 627 (Wingfield Orchard Drive)	
Isle of Wight	2.00	3.22	SR 615 (Holly Run Drive)	Pruden Road	SR 641 (Colosse Road)	
James City	2.10	3.38	SR 606 (Riverview Road)	York River Road	Dead End	
King George	1.11	1.79	SR 218	Fairview Drive	SR 1005 (Fifth Street)	
Lancaster	0.22	0.35	SR 615 (Crawfords Corner Road)	Butter Road	Dead End	
Lee	0.02	0.03	Tennessee state line	Flower Gap Road	SR 600 (Flower Gap Road)	
Loudoun	1.30	2.09	SR 626 (Foxcroft Road)	Polecat Hill Road	Dead End	
Louisa	1.75	2.82	Fluvanna County line	Deerfield Road Mallory Road	US 250 (Three Notch Road)	
Lunenburg	2.56	4.12	SR 638 (Stone Mill Road)	Poe Drive	SR 602 (Longview Drive)	
Madison	1.25	2.01	SR 684 (Radiant Way)	Tinsley Drive	Dead End	
Mathews	0.42	0.68	Dead End	Yacht Club Road	SR 639 (Crab Neck Road)	
Mecklenburg	6.30	10.14	SR 640 (East Organville Road)	Brankley Road New Hope Road	SR 688 (Skipwith Road)	
Middlesex	0.49	0.79	SR 33 (General Puller Highway)	Queens Point Drive	Dead End	
Montgomery	1.50	2.41	SR 652 (McCoy Road)	Wake Forest Road	Dead End	
Nelson	0.06	0.10	SR 56	Lentz Lane	Dead End	
Northampton	0.40	0.64	SR 655 (Magotha Road)	Harmony Road	SR 646 (Martins Landing Road)	
Northumberland	0.41	0.66	SR 605 (Mount Olive Road)	Gascony Lane	Dead End	
Nottoway	0.10	0.16	SR 628 (Agnew Street)	Knot Hill Street	Dead End	
Orange	0.80	1.29	SR 612 (Monrovia Road)	Tysons Center Road	Dead End	
Page	1.10	1.77	Dead End	Printz Mill Road	SR 669 (Valley Burg Road)	
Patrick	1.90	3.06	SR 694 (Hardin Reynolds Road)	Trents Orchard Road	SR 626 (Abram Penn Highway)	
Pittsylvania	0.60	0.97	Dead End	Buck Hill Road	SR 640 (Java Road)	
Prince Edward	11.11	17.88	US 360 (Kings Highway)	Green Bay Road	US 460 (Prince Edward Highway)	Formerly SR 135
Prince George	0.47	0.76	SR 605 (Spain Road)	Tartan Road	FR-122	
Prince William	0.17	0.27	SR 619 (Fuller Heights Road)	Cardinal Heights Road	Dead End	
Pulaski	0.10	0.16	Dead End	Crouse Court	SR 624 (New River Road)	
Richmond	0.19	0.31	Dead End	Heaggans Road	SR 3 (History Land Highway)	
Roanoke	3.10	4.99	Dead End	Unnamed road Martins Creek Road Apple Grove Lane	Dead End	Gap between segments ending at different points along US 221
Rockbridge	0.30	0.48	SR 655	Ford Hill Road	SR 654 (Hayslette Road)	
Rockingham	1.70	2.74	Augusta County line	Kiser Road	SR 727 (Airport Road)	
Russell	0.32	0.51	SR 82 (Cleveland Road)	Riverview Terrace Drive	SR 82 (Cleveland Road)	
Scott	3.78	6.08	Tennessee state line	Sycamore Lane McMurray Hollow Road Unnamed road	US 58 (Bristol Highway)	
Shenandoah	0.20	0.32	SR 601	Palmyra Road	Dead End	
Smyth	1.00	1.61	Dead End	Mountain Road	SR 610 (Old Quarry Road)	
Southampton	1.20	1.93	SR 35 (Meherrin Road)	Dickens Lane	SR 658 (Cedar View Road)	
Spotsylvania	1.10	1.77	Dead End	Sullivan Road	SR 606 (Post Oak Road)	
Stafford	0.50	0.80	SR 641 (Onville Road)	Ebenezer Church Road	Dead End	
Tazewell	1.80	2.90	Pauley Road	Big Branch Road	SR 102	
Washington	1.55	2.49	SR 695 (Chip Ridge Road)	Hillandale Road	SR 693 (Litchfield Road)	
Westmoreland	0.90	1.45	Dead End	Liberty Farm Road	SR 637 (Leedstown Road)	
Wise	0.20	0.32	SR 690 (Prospect Avenue)	5th Street	SR 690 (Prospect Avenue)	
Wythe	2.91	4.68	US 21 (Grayson Turnpike)	Barrett Mill Road Carrington Lane	Dead End	
York	0.07	0.11	Cul-de-Sac	Mary Ann Drive	SR 625 (Purgold Road)	
