= Virginia State Route 712 =

Secondary route designation

State Route 712

Route information
- Maintained by VDOT

Location
- Country: United States
- State: Virginia

Highway system
- Virginia Routes; Interstate; US; Primary; Secondary; Byways; History; HOT lanes

State Route 712 (SR 712) in the U.S. state of Virginia is a secondary route designation applied to multiple discontinuous road segments among the many counties. The list below describes the sections in each county that are designated SR 712.

== List ==
County	Length (mi)	Length (km)	From	Via	To	Notes
Accomack	6.10	9.82	SR 710 (Davis Road)	Sign Post Road Red Hills Road	Dead End	Gap between segments ending at different points along SR 679
Albemarle	14.92	24.01	US 29 (Monacan Trail Road)	North Garden Lane Plank Road Coles Rolling Road	SR 795 (Blenheim Road)	
Alleghany	0.28	0.45	SR 600	Dunlap Beach Lane	FR 202 (Dunlap Beach Lane)	
Amherst	1.91	3.07	US 60 (Richmond Highway)	Pendleton Drive	Dead End	
Augusta	1.70	2.74	SR 876 (Mich Barn Road)	Haytie Lane	Dead End	
Bedford	1.00	1.61	SR 808 (Island Creek Road)	Angel Place	Dead End	
Botetourt	1.20	1.93	SR 630 (Blacksburg Road)	Stevens Road	SR 665 (Country Club Road)	
Campbell	6.12	9.85	SR 43 (Bedford Highway)	Mount Herman Road Dearing Ford Road Riverbend Road	Dead End	Gap between segments ending at different points along US 29 Bus
Carroll	3.64	5.86	SR 683 (Poplar Knob Road)	Mallory Road Forest Oak Road	SR 620 (Forest Oak Road/Harrison Ridge Road)	Gap between segments ending at different points along SR 713
Chesterfield	0.20	0.32	SR 713 (Cross Street)	Gresham Avenue	SR 656 (Bellwood Drive)	
Dinwiddie	0.55	0.89	SR 703 (Carson Road)	Greentree Road	Dead End	
Fairfax	2.25	3.62	Dead End	Columbia Road Old Columbia Pike	SR 613 (Lincolnia Road)	
Fauquier	6.19	9.96	US 17 (Winchester Road)	Delaplane Grade Road	US 50 (John Mosby Highway)	
Franklin	0.20	0.32	SR 748 (Turners Creek Road)	Natures Own Road	Dead End	
Frederick	0.27	0.43	Winchester city limits	Unnamed road	Winchester city limits	
Halifax	2.32	3.73	SR 119 (Calvary Road)	Williamson Road	SR 696 (Henderson Road)	
Hanover	2.50	4.02	SR 54 (West Patrick Henry Road)	Robert Terrell Road	SR 674 (Woodman Hall Road)	
Henry	1.70	2.74	SR 698 (Crestridge Road)	Mary Hunter Drive	SR 57 Alt	
James City	0.43	0.69	SR 5 (John Tyler Memorial Highway)	Ferncliff Drive	Dead End	
Loudoun	3.45	5.55	Dead End	Yatton Road Simpsons Creek Road Scotland Heights Road Wilsons Gap Road	Dead End	Gap between segments ending at different points along SR 711
Louisa	0.80	1.29	Dead End	Buckners Lane	SR 700 (Johnson Road)	
Mecklenburg	7.46	12.01	SR 4 (Buggs Island Road)	Palmer Springs Road Paschall Road	North Carolina state line	
Montgomery	2.10	3.38	SR 723 (Lusters Gate Road)	Taylor Hollow Road	Dead End	
Pittsylvania	3.30	5.31	SR 656 (Kerns Church Road)	White Ridge Road	SR 656 (Kerns Church Road)	
Prince George	0.08	0.13	SR 106 (Courthouse Road)	Administration Drive	SR 709/SR 724	
Prince William	0.23	0.37	SR 1237 (Davis Street)	Marumsco Drive	SR 639 (Horner Road)	
Pulaski	0.30	0.48	SR 609 (Boyd Road)	Water Tank Road	Dead End	
Roanoke	0.32	0.51	SR 617 (Pitzer Road)	Simsmore Avenue	Dead End	
Rockbridge	8.32	13.39	SR 602 (Walkers Creek Road)	Unnamed road Decatur Road Unnamed road	Dead End	Gap between segments ending at different points along SR 717 Gap between segments ending at different points along US 11
Rockingham	3.40	5.47	SR 704 (Oakwood Drive)	Lewis Byrd Road West Mosby Road	Harrisonburg city limits	Gap between segments ending at different points along SR 701
Scott	0.02	0.03	SR 709 (A P Carter Highway)	A P Carter Highway	SR 614 (A P Carter Highway)	
Shenandoah	1.10	1.77	SR 710	Pennywitt Road	SR 614/SR 703	
Spotsylvania	0.40	0.64	SR 208 (Courthouse Road)	Bradley Lane	Dead End	
Stafford	1.90	3.06	SR 600 (Bethel Church Road)	Wood Landing Road	Dead End	
Tazewell	0.85	1.37	Dead End	Shannons Branch Road	SR 631 (Baptist Valley Road)	
Washington	4.23	6.81	Dead End	Bluff Hollow Road Delmar Road Zion Church Road	SR 719 (McCann Road)	Gap between segments ending at different points along US 58
Wise	0.25	0.40	SR 658 (River View Road)	Unnamed road	Dead End	
York	2.10	3.38	SR 762 (York Point Drive)	York Point Road Bay Tree Beach Road	Dead End	
