= Virginia State Route 717 =

Secondary route designation

State Route 717

Route information
- Maintained by VDOT

Location
- Country: United States
- State: Virginia

Highway system
- Virginia Routes; Interstate; US; Primary; Secondary; Byways; History; HOT lanes

State Route 717 (SR 717) in the U.S. state of Virginia is a secondary route designation applied to multiple discontinuous road segments among the many counties. The list below describes the sections in each county that are designated SR 717.

== List ==
County	Length (mi)	Length (km)	From	Via	To	Notes
Accomack	1.20	1.93	Dead End	Tarkill Road	SR 638 (Cashville Road/Evans Wharf Road)	
Albemarle	9.98	16.06	SR 6 (Irish Road)	Old Sand Road Secretarys Sand Road	SR 708 (Red Hill Road)	
Alleghany	0.32	0.51	Dead End	Boone Road	SR 159 (Dunlap Creek Road)	
Amherst	1.08	1.74	Dead End	Brown Town Road	SR 610 (Puppy Creek Road)	
Augusta	0.80	1.29	US 11 (Lee Jackson Highway)	Unnamed road Stagecoach Road	US 11 (Greenville Avenue)	
Bedford	5.50	8.85	SR 689 (Irving Road)	Murray Hollow Road	SR 692 (Cool Springs Road)	
Botetourt	0.63	1.01	Dead End	Ruby Road	SR 666 (White Church Road)	
Carroll	0.30	0.48	SR 612 (Foothills Road)	Penbrook Lane	Dead End	
Chesterfield	0.67	1.08	SR 144/SR 145	Centralia Road	Dead End	
Dinwiddie	0.50	0.80	SR 629 (Anderson Mill Road)	Anderson Drive	Dead End	
Fairfax	3.00	4.83	SR 7 (Leesburg Pike)	Utterback Store Road	SR 603 (Beach Mill Road)	
Fauquier	0.50	0.80	Dead End	Chestnut Forks Road Old Rectortown Road	SR 622 (Whiting Road)	Gap between segments ending at different points along SR 710
Franklin	1.30	2.09	SR 890 (Snow Creek Road)	Sutton Hollow Road	SR 632 (Mount Carmel Road)	
Frederick	0.45	0.72	Dead End	Caldwell Lane	SR 644 (Papermill Road)	
Halifax	0.25	0.40	SR 716 (Dryburg Road)	Hazelwood Mill Trail	Dead End	
Hanover	1.40	2.25	SR 627 (Pole Green Road)	Pine Hill Road	Dead End	
Henry	0.65	1.05	Dead End	Douglas Road Round Hill Road	SR 940 (Rosewood Avenue)	Gap between segments ending at different points along SR 457
James City	0.36	0.58	SR 732 (Braddock Road)	Druid Court	Dead End	
Loudoun	0.50	0.80	Dead End	Baker Mill Road	SR 287 (Berlin Turnpike)	
Louisa	0.70	1.13	Dead End	Central Branch Road	SR 613 (Poindexter Road)	
Mecklenburg	0.80	1.29	North Carolina state line	Epps Fork Road	SR 826 (Mill Creek Road)	
Montgomery	1.00	1.61	SR 610 (Huffville Road)	Old Sourwood Road	Dead End	
Pittsylvania	2.70	4.35	SR 726 (Malmaison Road)	Hunters Lane	Dead End	Gap between segments ending at different points along SR 825
Prince William	1.52	2.45	SR 1502 (Amherst Drive)	Yorkshire Lane	SR 28 (Centreville Road)	
Pulaski	0.04	0.06	Dead End	U Circle	SR 715 (Brandon Road)	
Roanoke	0.25	0.40	SR 632	Arthur Street	SR 904 (Starkey Road)	
Rockbridge	12.02	19.34	US 11 (Lee Highway)	Unnamed road Old Chapel Road Unnamed road Sterrett Road Unnamed road	SR 252 (Brownsburg Turnpike)	
Rockingham	11.82	19.02	SR 620 (Mountain Valley Road/Indian Trail Road)	Indian Trail Road	SR 608 (Mauzy Athlone Road)	
Scott	2.74	4.41	SR 652	Unnamed road	SR 649 (Rye Cove Memorial Road)	
Shenandoah	11.67	18.78	SR 263 (Orkney Grade)	Alum Springs Road Liberty Furnance Road	SR 675 (Wolf Gap Road)	Formerly SR 59 and SR 265
Stafford	0.32	0.51	SR 730 (Lake Shore Drive)	Sussex Street	SR 718 (Oxford Drive)	
Tazewell	0.36	0.58	SR 102	Adams Road	SR 643 (Brushfork Road)	
Washington	0.80	1.29	Dead End	Robinson Road	SR 663 (Golden View Drive)	
Wise	0.52	0.84	SR 610 (Powell Valley Road)	Unnamed road	Dead End	
York	0.69	1.11	SR 693 (Wormley Creek Drive)	Old Landing Road	Dead End	
