= Virginia State Route 729 =

Secondary route designation

State Route 729

Route information
- Maintained by VDOT

Location
- Country: United States
- State: Virginia

Highway system
- Virginia Routes; Interstate; US; Primary; Secondary; Byways; History; HOT lanes

State Route 729 (SR 729) in the U.S. state of Virginia is a secondary route designation applied to multiple discontinuous road segments among the many counties. The list below describes the sections in each county that are designated SR 729.

== List ==
County	Length (mi)	Length (km)	From	Via	To	Notes
Accomack	0.75	1.21	US 13 (Lankford Highway)	Finney Mason Lane	Dead End	
Albemarle	7.12	11.46	SR 618 (Martin King Road)	Buck Island Road Milton Road	US 250 (Richmond Road)	
Amherst	0.75	1.21	Dead End	Chestnut Lane	SR 610 (New Glasgow Road)	
Augusta	0.40	0.64	SR 766 (Reeves Road)	Hog Run Road	Rockingham County line	
Bedford	0.20	0.32	SR 617 (Pike Road)	Bobblett Gap Road	Dead End	
Botetourt	0.30	0.48	SR 43 (Narrow Passage Road)	Britt Lane	Dead End	
Campbell	0.46	0.74	Dead End	Pleasant Hill Road	US 501 (Campbell Highway)	
Carroll	1.00	1.61	SR 851 (Meadowlark Road)	Happy Hollow Road	Dead End	
Chesterfield	1.37	2.20	SR 605 (Moseley Road)	Ahem Road Lacy Farm Road	SR 605 (Moseley Road)	
Dinwiddie	0.53	0.85	SR 661 (Boisseau Road)	Spriggs Road	Dead End	
Fairfax	0.30	0.48	SR 236 (Little River Turnpike)	Roberts Avenue	Dead End	
Fauquier	3.47	5.58	SR 688 (Leeds Manor Road)	Carrington Road	SR 55 (John Marshall Highway)	Gap between segments ending at different points along SR 724
Franklin	0.25	0.40	SR 730 (Dans Road)	Larry Dale Road	Dead End	
Frederick	0.40	0.64	SR 664 (Jordan Springs Road)	Morrisons Road	SR 761 (Old Charles Town Road)	
Halifax	3.49	5.62	SR 716/SR 1323 (Dan River Church Road)	Bellevue Road Daniels Trail	Dead End	
Hanover	1.75	2.82	SR 680 (Woodson Mill Road/Shiloh Church Road)	Hollowing Creek Road	SR 658 (Tyler Station Road)	
Henry	0.65	1.05	Dead End	Rea Road	SR 634 (Joppa Road)	
James City	0.20	0.32	SR 728 (Raleigh Square Road)	Albemarle Drive	SR 728 (Raleigh Square Road)	
Loudoun	4.96	7.98	Dead End	Shelburne Glebe Road	SR 662 (Loudoun Orchard Road)	
Louisa	0.12	0.19	Dead End	South Main Street	SR 1015	
Mecklenburg	1.40	2.25	North Carolina state line	Winston Road	SR 735 (Averett Church Road)	
Montgomery	1.00	1.61	SR 612 (High Rock Hill Road)	Sunflower Road	Dead End	
Pittsylvania	22.89	36.84	Danville city limits	Kentuck Road Mount Tabor Road Pickaway Road Red Road	SR 698 (Stone Road)	Gap between segments ending at different points along SR 360 Gap between segments ending at different points along SR 57
Prince George	0.40	0.64	Dead End	Kurnas Lane	SR 156	
Pulaski	0.63	1.01	Dead End	Wilson Grove Road	SR 620 (Gum Log Road)	
Roanoke	0.15	0.24	SR 668 (Yellow Mountain Road)	Gearhart Road	Dead End	
Rockbridge	6.05	9.74	SR 39 (Maury River Road)	Unnamed road	SR 724 (Hays Creek Road)	Gap between segments ending at different points along SR 712 Gap between segments ending at different points along SR 726
Rockingham	1.00	1.61	Augusta County line	Cam Bell Road	SR 613 (Jordan Hill Road)	
Scott	0.05	0.08	Dead End	Boatdock Lane	SR 645 (Manville Road)	
Shenandoah	2.60	4.18	SR 614 (South Middle Road)	Garber Road	SR 263 (Orkney Grade)	
Spotsylvania	0.19	0.31	US 1 (Jefferson Davis Highway)	Hill Street	US 1 Bus	
Tazewell	0.58	0.93	Dead End	Ray Road	SR 629 (Daw Road)	
Washington	0.67	1.08	US 58 (Jeb Stuart Highway)	Azen Road	SR 602 (Azen Road)	
Wise	0.05	0.08	SR 78	Andover Road	SR 728	
