= Virginia State Route 713 =

Secondary route designation

State Route 713

Route information
- Maintained by VDOT

Location
- Country: United States
- State: Virginia

Highway system
- Virginia Routes; Interstate; US; Primary; Secondary; Byways; History; HOT lanes

State Route 713 (SR 713) in the U.S. state of Virginia is a secondary route designation applied to multiple discontinuous road segments among the many counties. The list below describes the sections in each county that are designated SR 713.

== List ==
County	Length (mi)	Length (km)	From	Via	To	Notes
Accomack	1.20	1.93	Maryland state line	Garland Taylor Road	Maryland state line	
Albemarle	3.42	5.50	Dead End	Dyers Mill Lane Glendower Road	SR 795 (Blenheim Road)	Gap between segments ending at different points along SR 20 Gap between segments ending at different points along SR 712
Alleghany	0.23	0.37	SR 714 (Woodbrook Drive)	Gilpin Avenue	SR 681 (Parkview Avenue)	
Amherst	1.40	2.25	SR 627 (Dug Hill Road)	Saint Marys Road	SR 621 (Indian Creek Road)	
Augusta	2.20	3.54	SR 876 (Glebe School Road)	Shuey Road	SR 707 (Trimbles Mill Road)	
Bedford	2.57	4.14	SR 24 (Wyatts Way)	Orrix Creek Road	SR 626 (Johnson Mountain Road)	
Botetourt	0.50	0.80	SR 605 (Sanderson Drive)	Richardson Drive	Dead End	
Campbell	1.00	1.61	SR 626 (Goodman Crossing Road)	Powell Road	SR 627 (Wileman Road)	
Carroll	8.05	12.96	SR 608 (Coal Creek Road)	Soapstone Road Elkhorn Road	SR 722 (Cranberry Road)	
Chesterfield	0.15	0.24	Dead End	Cross Street	SR 716 (Haven Avenue)	
Dinwiddie	2.54	4.09	US 1 (Boydton Plank Road)	Cutbank Church Road	SR 687 (Cutbank Road)	
Fairfax	0.41	0.66	Dead End	Beauregard Street North Chanbliss Street	SR 613 (Lincolnia Road)	
Fauquier	8.64	13.90	US 17 (Winchester Road)	Maidstone Road Atoka Road	US 50 (John Mosby Highway)	Gap between segments ending at different points along SR 710
Franklin	2.13	3.43	SR 674 (Doe Run Road)	Power Dam Road	Rocky Mount town limits	
Frederick	0.10	0.16	SR 712	Dinkle Drive	Dead End	
Halifax	0.70	1.13	Dead End	Turner Trail	SR 711 (Harmony Road)	
Hanover	0.90	1.45	Dead End	Holly Hill Road	SR 623 (Cedar Lane)	
Henry	0.35	0.56	SR 108 (Figsboro Road)	Ridgedale Road	SR 9868 (Figsboro Elementary Road)	
James City	0.15	0.24	SR 652 (Stanley Drive)	Hermitage Road	SR 712 (Ferncliff Drive)	
Loudoun	0.60	0.97	Dead End	Appalachian Trail Road	SR 719 (Woodgrove Road)	
Louisa	0.25	0.40	Dead End	Duval Road Moorevield Road	SR 700 (Mica Road)	
Mecklenburg	2.70	4.35	SR 711/SR 712	Rough Road	US 1	
Montgomery	0.90	1.45	SR 622 (Flatwoods Road/Reesdale Road)	Flatwoods Road	SR 603 (North Fork Road)	
Pittsylvania	16.81	27.05	Halifax County line	Rock Springs Road Birch Creek Road Oak Grove Road Lester Road	SR 701 (Slatesville Road)	Gap between segments ending at different points along SR 729 Gap between segments ending at different points along SR 360 Gap between segments ending at different points along SR 662
Prince William	0.60	0.97	Dead End	Chevalle Drive	SR 692 (Lucasville Road)	
Pulaski	0.28	0.45	SR 700 (Fairlawn Avenue)	Orchard Road	SR 701 (Oxford Avenue)	
Roanoke	0.13	0.21	SR 1315 (Bridle Lane)	Glen Heather Drive	SR 419 (Electric Road)	
Rockbridge	1.40	2.25	SR 714	Miss Maries Road	SR 706	
Rockingham	0.17	0.27	Dead End	Brunk Lane Meigs Lane	Dead End	
Scott	7.35	11.83	Tennessee state line	Stanley Valley Road Frisco Yard Road	SR 614 (Yuma Road)	
Shenandoah	3.90	6.28	Dead End	Sugar Hill Road	SR 600 (Zepp Road)	
Spotsylvania	1.41	2.27	Dead End	Boggs Drive	SR 601 (Lewiston Road)	
Stafford	0.37	0.60	SR 3 (Kings Highway)	Federal Drive	SR 730 (Lake Shore Drive)	
Tazewell	2.30	3.70	SR 16 (Stoney Ridge Road)	Ball Diamond Road	SR 642 (Crocketts Cove Road)	
Washington	0.70	1.13	Dead End	Alex Road	SR 712 (Bluff Hollow Road)	
Wise	0.24	0.39	SR 734/SR 735	Riverside Drive	US 23 Bus	
York	1.78	2.86	US 60 (Bypass Road)	Waller Mill Road	Dead End	
