= Virginia State Route 711 =

Secondary route designation

State Route 711

Route information
- Maintained by VDOT

Location
- Country: United States
- State: Virginia

Highway system
- Virginia Routes; Interstate; US; Primary; Secondary; Byways; History; HOT lanes

State Route 711 (SR 711) in the U.S. state of Virginia is a secondary route designation applied to multiple discontinuous road segments among the many counties. The list below describes the sections in each county that are designated SR 711.

== List ==
County	Length (mi)	Length (km)	From	Via	To	Notes
Accomack	0.50	0.80	SR 710 (Davis Road)	Tulls Mill Pond Road	Maryland state line	
Albemarle	0.55	0.89	SR 712 (North Garden Lane)	Burton Road	US 29 (Monacan Trail)	
Alleghany	0.15	0.24	SR 661 (Midland Trail)	Houston Circle	SR 661 (Midland Trail)	
Amelia	0.72	1.16	SR 678 (Cherry Row Lane)	Dash Lane	Dead End	
Amherst	0.60	0.97	Dead End	Bryant Hollow Road	SR 658 (Grandmas Hill Road)	
Appomattox	0.18	0.29	SR 26 (Oakville Road)	Dean Johns Place	Dead End	
Augusta	4.30	6.92	SR 694 (Mount Tabor Road)	Miller Farm Road	SR 708 (Glebe School Road)	
Bath	0.11	0.18	SR 633 (Tunnel Hill Road)	Watertank Road	Dead End	
Bedford	4.50	7.24	SR 24 (Wyatts Way)	Bethel Church Road	US 460 (Lynchburg Salem Turnpike)	
Botetourt	1.72	2.77	SR 640 (Nace Road)	Houston Mines Road	SR 647 (Lemon Lane)	
Brunswick	2.60	4.18	Lunenburg County Line	Rawlings Hill Road	SR 46 (Christanna Highway)	
Buchanan	1.19	1.92	Kentucky State Line	Upper Elk Creek Drive	Dead End	Only accessible via Kentucky Route 194
Buckingham	0.82	1.32	SR 632 (Scotts Bottom Road)	Seven Eleven Road	SR 628 (High Rock Road)	
Campbell	6.90	11.10	US 29 (Wards Road)	Clarion Road Tardy Mountain Road	SR 682 (Leesville Road)	Gap between segments ending at different points along SR 712
Caroline	0.11	0.18	SR 722 (Colonial Road)	Alliance Drive	Dead End	
Carroll	8.95	14.40	SR 620 (Forest Oak Road)	Apache Road Sandy Level Road Kenmore Road	SR 702 (Stable Road)	
Charlotte	0.93	1.50	Dead End	Garden Road	SR 617 (Bethel Road)	
Chesterfield	3.92	6.31	Powhatan County line	Robious Road	SR 147 (Huguenot Road)	Formerly SR 44
Culpeper	1.97	3.17	SR 630 (Jamesons Mill Road)	Bleak Hill Road	SR 625 (Mount Zion Church Road)	
Cumberland	0.86	1.38	SR 602 (Ampthill Road)	Crump Road	Dead End	
Dickenson	1.17	1.88	Dead End	Harman Ridge	SR 648 (Rachels Chapel Road)	
Dinwiddie	1.30	2.09	Dead End	Ridley Road	SR 670 (Old Stage Road)	
Essex	0.72	1.16	SR 611 (Wares Wharf Road)	Sunnyside Lane	SR 646 (Fort Lowry Lane)	
Fairfax	0.90	1.45	SR 650 (Annandale Road)	Gallows Road	SR 244 (Columbia Pike)	
Fauquier	0.90	1.45	SR 688 (Leeds Manor Road)	Snowden Road	Dead End	
Floyd	0.58	0.93	SR 641 (Graysville Road/Timberline Road)	Graysville Road	SR 642 (Graysville Road/Meadow Run Road)	
Franklin	0.78	1.26	Dead End	Tranquility Road	SR 616 (Morewood Road)	
Frederick	0.30	0.48	Dead End	Cather Lane	SR 803 (Round Hill Road)	
Giles	0.91	1.46	SR 100 (Narrows Road)	Fletchers Mountain Road	SR 100 (Narrows Road)	
Gloucester	0.54	0.87	SR 656	Carr Lane	Dead End	
Grayson	11.03	17.75	SR 727 (Kindreck Road)	Red Hawk Road Fox Creek Road Maple Road Gold Hill Road Battlefield Drive	US 58 (Wilson Highway)	Gap between segments ending at different points along SR 678 Gap between segments ending at different points along SR 601
Greensville	1.11	1.79	SR 611 (Brickyard Road)	Green Plains Road	Southampton County line	
Halifax	10.92	17.57	SR 699 (Mount Caramel Road)	Alton Post Office Road Harmony Road Denniston Road	US 501 (Huell Matthews Highway)	
Hanover	0.67	1.08	Dead End	Holly Ridge Road	SR 638 (Atlee Road)	
Henry	0.50	0.80	North Carolina state line	Friendly Road	SR 610 (Axton Road)	
Isle of Wight	1.45	2.33	Dead End	New Towne Haven Lane	SR 670 (Norsworthy Drive/Slant Drive)	
King George	0.20	0.32	Dead End	Dixon Lane	SR 624 (Owens Drive)	
Lancaster	0.53	0.85	Dead End	Old Airport Road	SR 354 (River Road)	
Lee	0.05	0.08	US 421	Driftwood Lane	US 421	
Loudoun	11.75	18.91	SR 7 (Harry Byrd Highway)	Williams Gap Road Allder School Road Piggott Bottom Road	SR 704 (Hamilton Station Road)	Gap between segments ending at different points along SR 719 Gap between segments ending at different points along SR 287
Louisa	1.00	1.61	SR 604 (Roundabout Road)	Patrick Henry Place	Dead End	
Lunenburg	0.93	1.50	SR 603 (Cedar Creek Road)	Sleigh Ride Hill Road	Brunswick County line	
Madison	0.68	1.09	Dead End	Russ Jones Lane	SR 607 (Repton Mill Road)	
Mathews	0.23	0.37	Dead End	West Landing Creek Road	SR 646 (Bar Neck Road)	
Mecklenburg	5.11	8.22	SR 712 (Palmer Springs Road)/SR 713 (Rough Road)	Mineral Springs Road Hardage Road	Dead End	
Middlesex	0.11	0.18	US 17 (Tidewater Trail)	Tank Road	SR 647	
Montgomery	0.40	0.64	SR 669 (Union Valley Road)	Surface Road	Cul-de-Sac	
Nelson	0.38	0.61	US 29 BUS (Front Street/Northside Lane)	Front Street Orchard Road	SR 1004 (Ridge Street)	
Northampton	0.92	1.48	Dead End	Long Point Road	SR 192 (Occohannock Neck Road)	
Northumberland	2.61	4.20	US 360 (Richmond Road)	Owl Town Road	US 360 (Richmond Road)	
Nottoway	0.09	0.14	SR 707 (McCahan Street)	5th Street Southeast	SR 697 (Dimmock Street)	
Orange	0.16	0.26	SR 3 (Germanna Highway)	Somerville Road	Dead End	
Page	0.45	0.72	Shenandoah town limit	Comer Lane	SR 602 (Comer Town Road)	
Patrick	1.51	2.43	Dead End	Poplar Camp Road	SR 40 (Charity Highway)	
Pittsylvania	1.68	2.70	Dead End	Slayton Road	SR 729 (Kentuck Road)	
Powhatan	14.6	23.50	US 522 (Maidens Road)	Huguenot Trail	Chesterfield County line	Formerly SR 44
Prince Edward	0.14	0.23	SR 630 (Redd Shop Road)	Seven Eleven Road	Dead End	
Prince George	0.94	1.51	US 301 (Crater Road)	Millpond Road	SR 156 (Prince George Drive)	
Prince William	0.98	1.58	Dead End	McGrath Road	SR 694 (Coles Drive)	
Pulaski	2.81	4.52	SR 738 (Robinson Tract Road)	Mines Road	Dead End	
Richmond	0.09	0.14	SR 3 Business (Main Street)	George Brown Lane	Dead End	Old alignment of SR 3
Roanoke	1.65	2.66	US 221 (Bent Mountain Road)	Tinsley Lane	US 221 (Bent Mountain Road)	
Rockbridge	1.30	2.09	US 11 (Lee Highway)	Unnamed road	Dead End	Gap between segments ending at different points along SR 706
Rockingham	0.91	1.46	SR 710 (Greendaile Road)	Grassy Creek Road	SR 704 (Osceola Springs Road)	
Russell	0.96	1.54	SR 636 (Kents Ridge Road)	Reynolds Lane	Dead End	
Scott	0.01	0.02	Tennessee state line	Unnamed road	SR 713 (Stanley Valley Road)	
Shenandoah	7.00	11.27	SR 611 (Supinlick Ridge Lane)	Bauserman Road	SR 703	Gap between segments ending at different points along SR 709
Southampton	1.49	2.40	US 58 (Southampton Parkway)	Green Plains Road	Greensville County line	
Spotsylvania	1.83	2.95	US 1	Southpoint Parkway Rollingwood Drive	Dead End	
Stafford	1.09	1.75	Dead End	Juggins Road Moncure Lane	Dead End	
Sussex	0.15	0.24	SR 647 (East North Street)	Savedge Avenue	Dead End	
Tazewell	0.22	0.35	Dead End	Beavers Road	SR 676 (Back Hollow Road)	
Warren	0.75	1.21	Dead End	Lower Valley Road	SR 710 (Lower Valley Road/Valley Overlook Court)	
Washington	3.30	5.31	SR 710 (Sweet Hollow Road)	AlvaradoRoad	Old US 58	Gap between segments ending at different points along US 58
Westmoreland	1.64	2.64	SR 621 (Mount Holly Road)	Bushfield Road Hickory Point Drive	Dead End	
Wise	0.25	0.40	SR 606 (Austin Hills Road)	Dogwood Lane	Dead End	
Wythe	0.57	0.92	SR 664 (Glade Road)	King Neill Lane	Dead End	
York	0.45	0.72	SR 660 (Baptist Road)	Church Road	SR 238 (Old Williamsburg Road)	
