= Virginia State Route 689 =

State highway in Virginia, United States

State Route 689

Route information
- Maintained by VDOT

Location
- Country: United States
- State: Virginia

Highway system
- Virginia Routes; Interstate; US; Primary; Secondary; Byways; History; HOT lanes

State Route 689 (SR 689) in the U.S. state of Virginia is a secondary route designation applied to multiple discontinuous road segments among the many counties. The list below describes the sections in each county that are designated SR 689.

== List ==
County	Length (mi)	Length (km)	From	Via	To	Notes
Accomack	5.15	8.29	SR 688 (Gladding Road)	Turkey Run Road Mappsville Road	Dead End	Gap between segments ending at different points along US 13
Albemarle	6.55	10.54	US 250 (Rockfish Gap Turnpike)	Burches Creek Road Pounding Creek Road	SR 637 (Dick Woods Road)	Gap between segments ending at different points along SR 635
Amelia	0.40	0.64	Dead End	Flippen Lane	SR 614 (Dennisville Road)	
Amherst	2.40	3.86	US 60 (Lexington Turnpike)	East Monitor Road	SR 617 (Bailey Sawmill Road)	
Appomattox	0.40	0.64	US 460 (Richmond Highway)	Spout Spring Road	SR 647 (Salem Road)	
Augusta	1.70	2.74	Dead End	Bear Wallow Flat Lane	SR 688 (Old Parkersburg Turnpike)	
Bath	0.15	0.24	SR 633	Little Gibralter Road	SR 39/SR 42	
Bedford	4.40	7.08	US 460 (Lynchburg Salem Turnpike)	Irving Road Johnson School Road	Dead End	Gap between segments ending at different points along US 460
Botetourt	0.70	1.13	Dead End	Pico Road	SR 625 (Pico Road)	
Brunswick	2.40	3.86	SR 643/SR 729	Unnamed road	SR 616 (Lew Jones Road)	
Buchanan	0.15	0.24	SR 83 (Edgewater Drive)	Mimosa Street	SR 83 (Edgewater Drive)	
Buckingham	1.05	1.69	US 15	Crescent Road Old Sheppards Road	Dead End	
Campbell	1.18	1.90	SR 690 (Clarks Road)	Moorman Mill Road Amy Road	SR 754 (Anstey Road)	
Caroline	4.90	7.89	US 1 (Jefferson Davis Highway)	Oxford Road	SR 658 (Jericho Road)	
Carroll	0.38	0.61	Dead End	Ballpark Drive	SR 706 (Farmers Market Drive)	
Charlotte	0.60	0.97	SR 47 (Thomas Jefferson Highway)	Carwile Road	SR 649 (Crawley Road)	
Chesterfield	0.43	0.69	Powhatan County line	County Line Road West	SR 671 (County Line Road)	
Craig	0.46	0.74	SR 615 (Craigs Creek Road)	Unnamed road	SR 694	
Culpeper	0.60	0.97	SR 655 (Somerville Road)	Cedar Run Road	US 522 (Zachary Taylor Highway)	Gap between dead ends
Cumberland	0.50	0.80	Dead End	Cedar Spring Road	SR 45 (Cartersville Road)/SR 690 (Columbia Road)	
Dickenson	3.15	5.07	SR 607	Unnamed road	SR 607/SR 704	
Dinwiddie	0.60	0.97	SR 629 (Anderson Mill Road)	Bobcat Road	SR 628 (Tranquility Lane)	
Essex	0.95	1.53	US 17 (Tidewater Trail)	Goldberry Lane	Dead End	
Fairfax	1.83	2.95	SR 309 (Old Dominion Drive)	Linway Terrace Chesterbrook Road	Arlington County line	Gap between segments ending at different points along SR 695
Fauquier	2.30	3.70	SR 678 (Piney Mountain Road)	Dudie Road Wilson Road	SR 691 (Carters Run Road/Wilson Road)	
Floyd	2.70	4.35	SR 615 (Christiansburg Pike)	Huckleberry Ridge Road	SR 679 (Bethlehem Church Road)	
Fluvanna	0.30	0.48	US 250 (Richmond Road)	Edgecomb Road	Louisa County line	
Franklin	1.96	3.15	SR 687 (Alean Road)	Sample Road	SR 116 (Jubal Early Highway)	
Frederick	4.20	6.76	SR 600 (Phalen Drive)	Adams Road	SR 600 (Brush Creek Road)	
Giles	0.60	0.97	SR 730 (Eggleston Road)	Old Schoolhouse Road	SR 622 (Village Street/Church Hill Road)	
Gloucester	0.55	0.89	SR 626 (Zanoni Road)	Muggins Creek Road	Dead End	
Goochland	0.50	0.80	Dead End	Robinson Road	SR 614 (Dogtown Road)	
Grayson	2.50	4.02	SR 691 (Fulton Road)	Flatrock Road Greenhouse Road	SR 654 Peach Bottom Road	Gap between segments ending at different points along SR 687
Greensville	0.52	0.84	US 301/I-95	Old Halifax Road	Emporia city limits	
Halifax	2.92	4.70	Dead End	Wooding Road	SR 658	
Hanover	1.50	2.41	SR 738 (Old Ridge Road)	Taylorsville Road	US 1 (Washington Highway)	
Henry	0.80	1.29	US 220 (Greensboro Road)	Reservoir Road	Dead End	
Isle of Wight	0.28	0.45	US 258 (Walters Highway)	Curve Drive	US 258 (Walters Highway)	
James City	0.12	0.19	SR 653 (Duer Drive)	Gilley Drive	SR 687 (Leon Drive)	
King and Queen	0.26	0.42	SR 624 (Root Swamp Road)	Frog Pond Road	Dead End	
King George	0.13	0.21	Dead End	Tenth Street	SR 614 (Potomac Drive)	
Lancaster	0.45	0.72	Dead End	Courtney Road	SR 625 (White Hall Road/Paynes Creek Road)	
Lee	0.50	0.80	SR 690 (Caylor Road)	Mattie Springs Road	Dead End	
Loudoun	0.80	1.29	Dead End	Creamer Lane	SR 9 (Charles Town Pike)	
Louisa	2.90	4.67	SR 713 (Moorefield Road/Duval Road)	Moorefield Road	SR 656 (Cedar Hill Road)	
Lunenburg	4.30	6.92	SR 680 (Crymes Road)	Wilson Farm Road Pleasant Grove Road	SR 626 (Double Bridge Road)	Gap between segments ending at different points along SR 40
Madison	0.45	0.72	SR 662 (Graves Mill Road)	Berry Mountain Lane	Dead End	
Mathews	0.36	0.58	Dead End	Davis Creek Road	SR 600 (Circle Drive)	
Mecklenburg	4.02	6.47	SR 701 (Wilbourne Road)	Rocky Mount Road	SR 688 (Skipwith Road)	
Middlesex	0.13	0.21	SR 659 (Marina Drive)	Perry Lane	SR 636 (Timberneck Road)	
Montgomery	0.11	0.18	Dead End	Sarver Road	SR 622 (Reesdale Road)	
Nelson	0.20	0.32	Dead End	Oakland Farm Lane	SR 620 (Farrar Bridge Lane)	
Northampton	0.28	0.45	Dead End	Pear Cottage Drive	SR 628 (Wilsonia Neck Drive)	
Northumberland	0.43	0.69	Dead End	Salem Road	US 360 (Northumberland Highway)	
Nottoway	0.16	0.26	SR 724 (Agnew Street)	Second Street Southeast	SR 709 (Cauthorn Street)	Gap between SR 663 and SR 697
Page	9.84	15.84	US 340 Bus (East Main Street)	Chapel Road Marksville Road Ida Road Stoneyman Road Antioch Road	Luray town limits	Formerly SR 266
Patrick	1.92	3.09	SR 680 (Spring Road)	VFW Road	SR 686 (Tudor Orchard Road)	
Pittsylvania	5.60	9.01	SR 691 (Mill Creek Road)	Strader Road	SR 685 (Chalk Level Road)	
Powhatan	0.30	0.48	Dead End	West County Line Road	Chesterfield County line	
Prince Edward	1.00	1.61	SR 613 (Indian Spring Road)	Old Forest Road	Dead End	
Prince William	3.28	5.28	Manassas city limits	Signal Hill Road	SR 614 (Evans Ford Road)	
Pulaski	0.24	0.39	Dead End	Newburn Road	SR 747 (Old Route 11)	
Richmond	0.19	0.31	Cul-de-Sac	Bunker Hill Road	SR 3 (History Land Highway)	
Roanoke	2.43	3.91	SR 692 (Mount Chestnut Road)	Roselawn Road	US 221 (Brambleton Road)	
Rockbridge	0.90	1.45	SR 743 (Family Barger Road)	Buck Hill Road	SR 608	
Rockingham	4.64	7.47	SR 988 (Scholars Road)	Spaders Church Road Shen Lake Drive	SR 276 (Cross Keys Road)	
Russell	0.10	0.16	Dead End	Hospital Hollow Road	SR 608 (Bunch Town Road)	
Scott	13.02	20.95	Dead End	Foggy Bottom Lane Unnamed road Lunsford Mill Road Ann Goode Cooper Road Jett Gap Ford Road Shoals Lane	SR 615	
Shenandoah	0.70	1.13	Dead End	Foltz Road	SR 694 (Wolverton Road)	
Smyth	5.30	8.53	SR 16	Hutton Branch Road Mitchell Valley Road Snider Branch Drive	Dead End	Gap between segments ending at different points along US 11
Southampton	2.30	3.70	SR 687 (Fork of the River Road)	School House Road	US 258 (Smith Ferry Road)	
Spotsylvania	0.30	0.48	SR 601 (Lewiston Road)	Gentry Lane	Dead End	
Stafford	0.45	0.72	SR 687 (Hope Road)	Hidden Springs Road	Dead End	
Tazewell	0.25	0.40	Bluefield town limits	Unnamed road	Bluefield town limits	
Warren	0.28	0.45	SR 624 (Morgan Ford Road)	Unnamed road	Dead End	
Washington	10.50	16.90	US 19 (Porterfield Highway)	Brumbley Gap Road	SR 80 (Hayters Gap Road)	
Westmoreland	0.50	0.80	Dead End	Erin Road	SR 649 (Federal Farm Road)	
Wise	0.50	0.80	Dead End	Unnamed road	US 23	
Wythe	0.50	0.80	SR 615	Sage Road	SR 616 (Murphyville Road)	
York	0.11	0.18	Cul-de-Sac	Harbor Crescent	SR 627 (Landing Road)	
