= Virginia State Route 716 =

Secondary route designation

State Route 716

Route information
- Maintained by VDOT

Location
- Country: United States
- State: Virginia

Highway system
- Virginia Routes; Interstate; US; Primary; Secondary; Byways; History; HOT lanes

State Route 716 (SR 716) in the U.S. state of Virginia is a secondary route designation applied to multiple discontinuous road segments among the many counties. The list below describes the sections in each county that are designated SR 716.

== List ==
County	Length (mi)	Length (km)	From	Via	To	Notes
Accomack	0.34	0.55	SR 609 (Brickhouse Drive)	Warrior Drive	US 13 (Lankford Highway)	
Albemarle	1.00	1.61	SR 719 (Alberene Road)	Forsyth Road	SR 627 (Green Mountain Road)	
Alleghany	0.22	0.35	Dead End	Unnamed road	SR 708 (McAllister Drive)	
Amherst	0.20	0.32	US 60 (Lexington Turnpike)	Moss Rock Road	Dead End	
Augusta	2.40	3.86	SR 629 (Deerfield Valley Road)	West Augusta Road	US 250 (Hankey Mountain Highway)	
Bedford	1.50	2.41	SR 715 (Junction School Road/Claytor Mill Road)	Goggin Ford Road	Dead End	
Botetourt	1.83	2.95	SR 651 (Stoney Battery Road)	Apple Orchard Lane	SR 651 (Stoney Battery Road)	
Campbell	0.27	0.43	Cul-de-Sac	Misty Mountain Road	SR 631 (Mount Airy Road)	
Carroll	2.70	4.35	Dead End	End of the Line Road Red Fox Lane Stetson Road	SR 608 (Coal Creek Road)	
Chesterfield	0.20	0.32	SR 713 (Cross Street)	Haven Avenue	SR 656 (Bellwood Drive)	
Dinwiddie	0.36	0.58	SR 611/SR 751	Poole Siding Road	SR 751 (Cox Road)	
Fairfax	0.67	1.08	Alexandria city limits	Seminary Road	SR 7 (Leesburg Pike)	
Fauquier	2.35	3.78	SR 713 (Atoka Road)	Five Points Road	SR 702 (Frogtown Road)	
Franklin	0.57	0.92	SR 697 (Brick Church Road)	Copperfield Road	SR 697 (Brick Church Road)	Gap between dead ends
Frederick	0.39	0.63	Dead End	Dodge Avenue	SR 7 (Berryville Pike)	
Halifax	21.33	34.33	SR 129 (Old Halifax Road)	Rodgers Chapel Road Wolf Trap Road Falkland Road Dryburg Road Mosely Ferry Road	SR 92/SR 1004 (Main Street)	
Hanover	0.38	0.61	SR 669 (Independence Road)	Blunts Road	SR 667 (Blunts Bridge Road)	
Henry	0.20	0.32	SR 57/SR 919	Campbell Court	Dead End	
James City	0.84	1.35	SR 715 (North Riverside Drive)	Hampton Drive South Riverside Drive	Cul-de-Sac	
Loudoun	5.83	9.38	SR 720 (Bell Road)	Simmons Road Osburn Road Ketoctin Church Road Short Hill Road Edgegrove Road	SR 751 (Cider Mill Road)	Gap between segments ending at different points along SR 711 Gap between segments ending at different points along SR 719
Louisa	1.30	2.09	SR 612 (Halls Store Road)	Garland Town Road	Dead End	
Mecklenburg	1.65	2.66	North Carolina state line	Keats Point Road	Dead End	
Montgomery	2.05	3.30	Dead End	Little Camp Road	Dead End	
Pittsylvania	3.60	5.79	SR 726 (Malmaison Road)	Keeling Drive	SR 360 (Old Richmond Road)	
Prince William	0.80	1.29	Dead End	Beverly Road	SR 55 (John Marshall Highway)	
Pulaski	0.27	0.43	SR 715 (Brandon Road)	South Drive	SR 703 (Ridge Road)	
Roanoke	0.31	0.50	SR 717 (Arthur Street)	Stearnes Avenue	SR 632 (Crescent Boulevard)	
Rockbridge	8.85	14.24	SR 39 (Maury River Road)	Mount Atlas Road Timber Ridge Road	SR 608 (South River Road)	Gap between segments ending at different points along US 11
Rockingham	2.40	3.86	SR 717 (Indian Trail Road)	Beulah Road	Dead End	
Scott	2.60	4.18	SR 65 (Sinking Creek Highway)	Chestnut Ridge Road	SR 607 (Chestnut Ridge Road)	
Shenandoah	7.50	12.07	SR 42 (Senedo Road)	Graveltown Road	SR 694 (Wolverton Road)	Gap between SR 729 and SR 263 Gap between segments ending at different points along SR 711 Gap between segments ending at different points along SR 703
Spotsylvania	0.33	0.53	US 1 Bus (Lafayette Boulevard)	Southgate Avenue	SR 1203 (End Drive)	
Stafford	0.39	0.63	Dead End	Greenwood Drive Kent Avenue	SR 718 (Oxford Drive)	
Tazewell	0.21	0.34	SR 644 (Bossevain Road)	Laurel Star Road	SR 644 (Bossevain Road)	
Washington	1.83	2.95	Tennessee state line	South Shady Avenue	SR 1222 (Imboden Street)	
Wise	0.40	0.64	SR 1121 (Halifax Road)	Unnamed Road	SR 1121 (Halifax Road)	
York	4.18	6.73	SR 641 (Penniman Road)	Hubbard Lane Queens Drive	SR 1314 (Lakeshead Drive)	
