= Virginia State Route 698 =

State highway in Virginia, United States

State Route 698

Route information
- Maintained by VDOT

Location
- Country: United States
- State: Virginia

Highway system
- Virginia Routes; Interstate; US; Primary; Secondary; Byways; History; HOT lanes

State Route 698 (SR 698) in the U.S. state of Virginia is a secondary route designation applied to multiple discontinuous road segments among the many counties. The list below describes the sections in each county that are designated SR 698.

== List ==
| County | Length (mi) | Length (km) | From | Via | To | Notes |
|---|---|---|---|---|---|---|
| Accomack | 2.30 | 3.70 | Dead End | Marsh Market Road Holdens Creek Road | Dead End | Gap between segments ending at different points along SR 692 Gap between segments ending at different points along SR 695 |
| Albemarle | 1.84 | 2.96 | SR 633 (Heards Mountain Road) | Hungrytown Road | Dead End | |
| Alleghany | 0.13 | 0.21 | SR 648 (Horse Mountain View Road) | Chapel Drive | SR 628 (Jackson Drive) | |
| Amelia | 0.62 | 1.00 | US 360 (Patrick Henry Highway) | Circle Drive | US 360 (Patrick Henry Highway) | |
| Amherst | 1.10 | 1.77 | SR 629 (Little Piney Road) | Dismal Mountain Road | Dead End | |
| Appomattox | 1.30 | 2.09 | Campbell County line | Angus Road | SR 607 (Columbus Road) | |
| Augusta | 0.84 | 1.35 | SR 646 (Fadley Road) | Summit Church Road Wise Hollow Road | Rockingham County line | |
| Bath | 0.12 | 0.19 | SR 633 | Christian Lane | SR 635 (Walker Road) | |
| Bedford | 3.99 | 6.42 | Dead End | Villamont Church Road Villamont Road Creasy Road Dewey Road | SR 697 (Camp Jaycee Road) | Gap between dead ends at a railroad track |
| Botetourt | 1.39 | 2.24 | SR 633 (McKinney Hollow Road) | Lick Run Road | Dead End | |
| Brunswick | 0.20 | 0.32 | Dead End | Daniel Lane | SR 729 (New Hope Road) | |
| Buchanan | 0.02 | 0.03 | SR 624 | Garden Creek Road | Dead End | |
| Buckingham | 3.15 | 5.07 | SR 627 (Axtell Road) | Mountain View Road | SR 653 (Logan Road) | |
| Campbell | 3.50 | 5.63 | SR 701 (East Ferry Road) | Theta Mill Road | SR 761 (Long Island Road) | |
| Caroline | 0.50 | 0.80 | Dead End | Shockey Lane | SR 669 (Trivette Road) | |
| Carroll | 2.45 | 3.94 | SR 775 (Chances Creek Road) | Good Hope Road Spring Bud Drive Spring Bud Lane | SR 775 (Chances Creek Road) | |
| Charlotte | 0.90 | 1.45 | Dead End | Greenview Road | SR 746 (Scuffletown Road) | |
| Chesterfield | 0.70 | 1.13 | Dead End | State Avenue | SR 746 (Enon Church Road) | |
| Culpeper | 0.18 | 0.29 | SR 603 (White Shop Road) | Sycamore Lane | Dead End | |
| Cumberland | 0.25 | 0.40 | Dead End | Cuffie Road | SR 657 (Jamestown Road) | |
| Dickenson | 1.00 | 1.61 | SR 643 (Carter Stanley Highway) | Rainwater Trail Road | Dead End | |
| Dinwiddie | 1.20 | 1.93 | SR 665 (Walkers Mill Road) | Double Branch Road | Sussex County line | |
| Essex | 0.94 | 1.51 | US 17 | White Oak Road Hobbs Hole Drive | US 17 | |
| Fairfax | 3.03 | 4.88 | US 50 (Arlington Boulevard) | Cedar Lane | SR 650 (Gallows Road) | |
| Fauquier | 4.67 | 7.52 | US 17 (James Madison Highway) | OBannon Road | SR 55 (John Marshall Highway) | |
| Floyd | 0.70 | 1.13 | Dead End | Little River Road | SR 8 (Webbs Mill Road) | |
| Fluvanna | 0.30 | 0.48 | Dead End | Memory Lane | US 250/SR 627 | |
| Franklin | 1.98 | 3.19 | SR 699 (Angle Plantation Road) | Kin Vale Road | Dead End | |
| Frederick | 0.13 | 0.21 | SR 127 (Bloomery Pike) | Omps Road | SR 696 (South Timber Ridge Road) | |
| Giles | 0.10 | 0.16 | SR 796 (Old Newport Road) | Cherry Hill Lane | Dead End | |
| Gloucester | 0.22 | 0.35 | SR 656 (Glass Road) | Stump Point Road | Cul-de-Sac | |
| Goochland | 0.12 | 0.19 | SR 632 (Fairground Road) | Mickeytown Road | SR 637 (Hawk Town Road) | |
| Grayson | 1.47 | 2.37 | SR 697 (Beaver Dam Road) | Church Hill Road Pleasant Grove Road | US 58 (Grayson Parkway) | |
| Greensville | 0.50 | 0.80 | SR 607 (Westward Road) | Spangler Lane | Dead End | |
| Halifax | 1.90 | 3.06 | Pittsylvania County line | Henrys Mill Road | SR 360 (Mountain Road) | |
| Henry | 12.02 | 19.34 | SR 695 (Spencer-Preston Road) | Airport Road Crestridge Road Blackberry Road | SR 1228/SR 57 Alt | Gap between segments ending at different points along SR 627 Gap between segments ending at different points along SR 687 |
| Isle of Wight | 0.01 | 0.02 | Dead End | Dot Way | SR 611 (Joyners Bridge Road) | |
| James City | 0.04 | 0.06 | Dead End | Rogers Court | SR 617 (Lake Powell Road) | |
| King George | 2.28 | 3.67 | Dead End | Nanzatico Lane | SR 625 (Salem Church Road) | |
| Lancaster | 0.09 | 0.14 | SR 735 (Sandlin Drive) | Sandlin Drive | SR 200 (Irvington Road) | |
| Lee | 1.03 | 1.66 | Dead End | Cowans Mill Road Calway Road | SR 684 (Chadwell Station Road) | |
| Loudoun | 8.65 | 13.92 | SR 9 (Charles Town Pike) | Old Wheatland Road Water Street Old Waterford Road | Leesburg town limits | Gap between segments ending at different points along SR 662 Gap between segments ending at different points along SR 665 |
| Louisa | 2.20 | 3.54 | SR 606 (Waltons Store Road) | Rolling Path Road | SR 640 (Old Mountain Road) | |
| Lunenburg | 0.49 | 0.79 | Dead End | Aubrey Road | SR 628 (County Line Road) | |
| Madison | 0.50 | 0.80 | Dead End | Gabriel Lane | SR 652 (Horn Hollow Lane) | |
| Mathews | 0.20 | 0.32 | SR 649 (Peary Road) | Captains Grenes Road | Dead End | |
| Mecklenburg | 5.40 | 8.69 | SR 609 (Trottinridge Road) | Jones Road Middle School Road | SR 701 (Wilbourne Road) | |
| Middlesex | 0.07 | 0.11 | SR 617 (Watson Landing Road) | Legion Road | SR 697 (Forrer Street) | |
| Nelson | 0.39 | 0.63 | Amherst County line | B & W Lane | Dead End | |
| Northampton | 0.20 | 0.32 | Dead End | Adron Street | SR 652 (Cathey Avenue) | |
| Northumberland | 0.75 | 1.21 | Dead End | Academic Lane | US 360 (Northumberland Highway) | |
| Nottoway | 0.32 | 0.51 | SR 678 (Oak Street) | Fourth Street | SR 697 (Dimmick Street) | |
| Orange | 0.30 | 0.48 | SR 605 (Barnes Road) | Reynolds Road | Dead End | |
| Page | 0.70 | 1.13 | SR 654 | River Lodge Road | Dead End | |
| Patrick | 1.60 | 2.57 | Dead End | Coleman Lane Sheppard Mill Road | North Carolina state line | Gap between segments ending at different points along SR 631 |
| Pittsylvania | 6.94 | 11.17 | Halifax County line | Henrys Mill Road Stone Road | SR 640 (Java Road) | |
| Prince Edward | 1.45 | 2.33 | SR 663 (Baker Mountain Road) | Rosser Mill Road | SR 660 (Heights School Road) | |
| Prince George | 0.21 | 0.34 | SR 699 (River Run Road) | Irwin Road | SR 694 (Irwin Road) | |
| Prince William | 1.20 | 1.93 | Dead End | Piney Branch Lane | Cul-de-Sac | |
| Pulaski | 0.90 | 1.45 | Dead End | Barsus Road | Dead End | |
| Richmond | 0.36 | 0.58 | Dead End | Gravel Pit Road | SR 632 (Islington Road) | |
| Roanoke | 1.40 | 2.25 | SR 311 (Catawba Valley Drive) | Keffer Road | SR 779 (Catawba Creek Road) | |
| Rockbridge | 1.50 | 2.41 | SR 700 | Round Hill Road | SR 608 (Forge Road) | |
| Rockingham | 1.80 | 2.90 | Augusta County line | Wise Hollow Road | SR 727 (Airport Road) | |
| Russell | 3.20 | 5.15 | Dead End | Sykes Drive | SR 646 (John Simms Hill Road) | |
| Scott | 3.30 | 5.31 | Tennessee state line | Timbertree Branch Road Unnamed road | SR 694 (New Hurland Church Lane) | Gap between segments ending at different points along SR 696 |
| Shenandoah | 13.42 | 21.60 | SR 767 (Quicksburg Road) | Turkey Knob Road Orchard Drive Race Street Red Banks Road Palmyra Church Road Unnamed road | US 11 (Old Valley Pike) | Gap between segments ending at different points along SR 263 Gap between segments ending at different points along US 11 |
| Smyth | 1.00 | 1.61 | SR 613 (Allisons Gap Road) | Cardwell Town Road | Dead End | |
| Southampton | 1.80 | 2.90 | SR 683 (Mary Hunt Road) | Duke Road | SR 672 | |
| Spotsylvania | 0.10 | 0.16 | US 17 Bus | Harry Lee Drive | SR 683 (Bartlett Lane) | |
| Stafford | 0.20 | 0.32 | US 17 Bus (Warrenton Road) | RV Parkway | Dead End | |
| Sussex | 2.00 | 3.22 | SR 681 (Concord Sappony Road) | Sandy Field Road | Dinwiddie County line | |
| Tazewell | 0.10 | 0.16 | SR 637 (Pound Mill Branch Road) | Maxwell Road | Dead End | |
| Washington | 0.12 | 0.19 | Dead End | Unnamed road | SR 663 (Country Park Road) | |
| Westmoreland | 0.75 | 1.21 | Dead End | Grainery Road | SR 645 (Zacata Road) | |
| Wise | 0.20 | 0.32 | SR 609 | Unnamed road | SR 613 | |
| Wythe | 1.00 | 1.61 | SR 627 (Archer Road) | Rome Road | Dead End | |
| York | 0.43 | 0.69 | SR 693 (Wormley Creek Drive) | Yorkview Road | SR 693 (Wormley Creek Drive) | |
