= Virginia State Route 692 =

State highway in Virginia, United States

State Route 692

Route information
- Maintained by VDOT

Location
- Country: United States
- State: Virginia

Highway system
- Virginia Routes; Interstate; US; Primary; Secondary; Byways; History; HOT lanes

State Route 692 (SR 692) in the U.S. state of Virginia is a secondary route designation applied to multiple discontinuous road segments among the many counties. The list below describes the sections in each county that are designated SR 692.

== List ==
County	Length (mi)	Length (km)	From	Via	To	Notes
Accomack	12.06	19.41	SR 695 (Saxis Road)	Belinda Road Marsh Market Road Savannah Road Main Street Hallwood Road Chesser Road Arbuckle Neck Road	Dead End	Gap between segments ending at different points along US 13 Gap between segments ending at different points along SR 679
Albemarle	10.64	17.12	US 250 (Rockfish Gap Turnpike)	Plank Road	SR 712 (Garden Lane)	Gap between segments ending at different points along SR 635
Alleghany	0.13	0.21	Dead End	Stratton Street	SR 625 (East Dolly Ann Drive)	
Amelia	0.65	1.05	SR 651 (Archers Creek Lane)	Rocky Branch Lane	Dead End	
Amherst	2.00	3.22	SR 617 (Poor House Farm Road)	Longbranch Drive Muddy Branch Road	SR 616 (West Monitor Road)	
Appomattox	2.90	4.67	Dead End	State Park Road	SR 640 (Woolridge Road)	
Augusta	1.04	1.67	Dead End	Rocky Spring Lane	SR 600 (Marble Valley Road)	
Bath	0.35	0.56	SR 39 (Mountain Valley Road)	Old Germantown Road	SR 39 (Mountain Valley Road)	
Bedford	3.00	4.83	SR 688 (Buffalo Run Road)	Cool Springs Road	Dead End	
Botetourt	1.44	2.32	SR 688 (Salt Petre Cave Road)	Shiloh Church Road	SR 612 (Shiloh Drive)	
Brunswick	1.61	2.59	SR 46 (Christanna Highway)	Matthews Chapel Road	SR 611 (Dry Bread Road)	
Buchanan	0.90	1.45	Dead End	Combs Ridge Road	SR 602	
Buckingham	0.25	0.40	US 15 (James Madison Highway)	Baptist Union Road	Dead End	
Campbell	3.33	5.36	SR 24/SR 748	Masons Mill Road	US 29 (Wards Road)	
Caroline	0.10	0.16	SR 778 (Allen Lane)	Allen Street	SR 639 (Ladysmith Road)	
Carroll	7.41	11.93	SR 691 (Flower Gap Road)	Sandy Ridge Road Apple Ridge Road	SR 690 (Brushy Fork Road)	
Charlotte	0.70	1.13	SR 47 (Graftons Gate Highway)	WPA Road	SR 623 (West Point Stevens Road)	
Chesterfield	1.78	2.86	SR 634 (Cattail Road)	Reedy Branch Road	SR 626 (Woodpecker Road)	
Craig	0.25	0.40	SR 311 (Craig Valley Drive)	Unnamed road	Dead End	
Culpeper	3.40	5.47	SR 649 (Cedar Mountain Road)	Old Orange Road	SR 299 (Madison Road)	
Cumberland	0.65	1.05	Dead End	Briar Creek Road	SR 676 (Asai Road)	
Dickenson	0.60	0.97	Dead End	Unnamed road	SR 637 (DC Caney Ridge Road)	
Dinwiddie	5.69	9.16	Dead End	Sapony Church Road	Dead End	
Essex	0.74	1.19	SR 617 (Richmond Beach Road)	Comemans Island Road	Dead End	
Fairfax	0.35	0.56	SR 693 (Westmoreland Street)	Roosevelt Street	Arlington County line	
Fauquier	0.39	0.63	Dead End	Kines Road	SR 670 (Old Auburn Road)	
Floyd	2.00	3.22	SR 729 (Wills Ridge Road)	Low Gap Road	SR 730 (Ridge View Road)	
Fluvanna	0.45	0.72	Dead End	Kathys Lane	SR 676 (Oliver Creek Road)	
Franklin	5.56	8.95	SR 697 (Brick Church Road)	Rock Lilly Road Gilmer Branch Road Harmony Road	Dead End	Gap between segments ending at different points along SR 691
Frederick	4.40	7.08	US 522 (Frederick Pike)	Chapel Hill Road Pack Horse Road	West Virginia state line	
Giles	0.54	0.87	Dead End	Big Rock Road Palisades Drive	SR 100 (Pulaski Giles Turnpike)	
Gloucester	0.84	1.35	SR 623 (Ware Neck Road)	Dunham Massey Lane	Dead End	
Goochland	0.50	0.80	Dead End	Bell Road	SR 613 (Riddles Bridge Road)	
Grayson	2.00	3.22	SR 694 (Pine Mountain Road)	Pine Mountain Road	SR 274 (Riverside Drive)	Gap between segments ending at different points along SR 691
Greensville	0.81	1.30	SR 604	Ruby Trail	Cul-de-Sac	
Halifax	0.45	0.72	Dead End	Richardson Lane	SR 751 (Storys Creek Road)	
Hanover	0.30	0.48	Dead End	Dellwood Road	US 1 (Washington Highway)	
Henry	7.71	12.41	North Carolina state line	Horsepasture Price Road Arrowhead Circle	US 58 (A L Philpott Highway)	
Isle of Wight	3.20	5.15	US 258 (Courthouse Highway)	Poor House Road Uzzell Church Road	SR 654 (Carroll Bridge Road)	Gap between segments ending at different points along SR 652
James City	0.40	0.64	SR 648 (Whiting Avenue)	Railroad Street	SR 654 (Jackson Street)	
King and Queen	0.06	0.10	Dead End	Dahlgren Road	SR 632 (Hockley Neck Road)	
King George	2.60	4.18	Dead End	Cleve Road	SR 607 (Port Conway Road)	
Lancaster	0.72	1.16	Dead End	Belmont Creek Road	SR 354 (River Road)	
Lee	1.78	2.86	Tennessee state line	Unnamed road	US 58 (Daniel Boone Trail)	
Loudoun	2.90	4.67	SR 693 (Morrisonville Road)	Rickard Road Bolington Road Rocky Lane	Dead End	Gap between segments ending at different points along SR 691 Gap between segments ending at different points along SR 681
Louisa	2.60	4.18	SR 613 (Oakland Road)	Hickory Creek Road	SR 620 (Vawter Corner Road)	
Lunenburg	3.20	5.15	SR 622 (Ontario Road)	Unnamed road	SR 690 (Davis Low Grand Road)	
Madison	0.53	0.85	SR 230 (Wolftown-Hood Road)	Riverview Lane	Dead End	
Mathews	0.52	0.84	SR 601 (Horn Harbor Avenue)	Horn Harbor Avenue	Dead End	
Mecklenburg	0.80	1.29	Dead End	Rochichi Drive	US 58	
Middlesex	0.15	0.24	Dead End	Stoneham Street	US 17 Bus	
Montgomery	0.80	1.29	SR 672 (Camp Carysbrook Road)	Goldenrod Road	SR 695 (Chestnut Ridge Road)	
Nelson	0.40	0.64	SR 633 (Taylor Creek Road)	Locust Grove Lane	Dead End	
Northampton	1.30	2.09	Dead End	Happy Union Drive	SR 606 (Wardtown Road)	
Northumberland	0.30	0.48	Begin Loop	Shell Landing Road	SR 657 (Fleeton Road)	
Nottoway	0.55	0.89	Dead End	Fairview Road	SR 606 (Cottage Road)	
Orange	11.23	18.07	SR 651 (Tatum Road)	Saint Just Road Grusty Gold Mine Road Burr Hill Road Tinsley Mill Road	Dead End	Gap between segments ending at different points along SR 20
Page	0.41	0.66	Dead End	Unnamed road	Shenandoah town limits	
Patrick	6.46	10.40	SR 680 (Pleasant View Drive/Spring Road)	Spring Road Anthony Drive	SR 627 (Egg Farm Road)	
Pittsylvania	1.95	3.14	SR 685 (Chalk Level Road)	Transco Road	SR 649 (Sheva Road)	
Prince Edward	4.99	8.03	SR 665 (Abilene Road)	Calebville Road	US 15 (Farmville Road)	
Prince William	3.15	5.07	SR 619 (Bristow Road)	Lucasville Road	Manassas city limits	
Pulaski	1.00	1.61	SR 693 (Julia Simpkins Road)	Cole Mountain Road	Dead End	
Richmond	0.62	1.00	SR 3 (History Land Highway)	North Farnham Church Road	SR 3 (History Land Highway)	
Roanoke	5.76	9.27	US 221 (Bent Mountain Road)	Mount Chestnut Road Sugarloaf Road Unnamed road	SR 685 (Keagy Road)	
Rockbridge	1.60	2.57	SR 610 (Plank Road)	Cedar Creek Road Unnamed road	Dead End	
Rockingham	0.60	0.97	Dead End	River Bluff Road	SR 693 (Fairview Road)	
Russell	1.00	1.61	Dead End	Belcher Road	SR 645 (New Garden Road)	
Scott	1.14	1.83	US 58 (Bristol Highway)	Unnamed road Dowell Gap Road	SR 614 (A P Carter Highway)	
Shenandoah	0.70	1.13	SR 693 (Polk Road)	Wiltons Road	SR 691 (Judge Rye Road)	
Smyth	0.59	0.95	Marion town limits	Keller Lane	Dead End	
Southampton	0.90	1.45	SR 775 (Sunlight Drive)	White House Road	US 58 Bus	
Spotsylvania	0.75	1.21	Dead End	Sunnybrook Farm Road	SR 608 (Robert E Lee Drive)	
Stafford	1.00	1.61	Dead End	Quarry Road	SR 658 (Brent Point Road)	
Tazewell	1.38	2.22	SR 644 (Horsepen Road)	Brown Hollow Road	Dead End	
Washington	5.89	9.48	Abingdon town limits	Whites Mill Road Toole Creek Road	SR 611 (North Fork River Road)	
Westmoreland	1.40	2.25	SR 612 (Coles Point Road)	Cherry Grove Road	SR 756 (Waterview Drive)	
Wise	1.50	2.41	Dead End	Unnamed road	US 23	
Wythe	0.90	1.45	Dead End	Trout Farm Road	SR 749 (Cedar Springs Road)	
York	0.25	0.40	Dead End	Oak Point Drive	SR 631 (Waterview Road)	
