= Virginia State Route 751 =

Secondary route designation

State Route 751

Route information
- Maintained by VDOT

Location
- Country: United States
- State: Virginia

Highway system
- Virginia Routes; Interstate; US; Primary; Secondary; Byways; History; HOT lanes

State Route 751 (SR 751) in the U.S. state of Virginia is a secondary route designation applied to multiple discontinuous road segments among the many counties. The list below describes the sections in each county that are designated SR 751.

== List ==
County	Length (mi)	Length (km)	From	Via	To	Notes
Accomack	0.25	0.40	SR 657 (Deep Creek Road)	Hopkins Drive	Dead End	
Albemarle	0.75	1.21	Dead End	Brownsville Road	US 250 (Rockfish Gap Turnpike)	
Amherst	1.15	1.85	Dead End	Hartless Road	SR 151 (Patrick Henry Highway)	
Augusta	0.60	0.97	Waynesboro city limits	Gravel Ridge Road	Dead End	
Bedford	1.00	1.61	US 460/US 221 (Lynchburg Salem Turnpike)	Circle K Road	Dead End	
Botetourt	0.07	0.11	SR 742 (Branch Road)	Fridley Hill Road	SR 43 (Church Street)	
Campbell	2.00	3.22	SR 686 (Browns Mill Road)	Stone Road	SR 701 (East Ferry Road)	
Carroll	2.90	4.67	SR 693 (Sylvatus Smith Road)	Windsong Road Drypond Road	Dead End	
Chesterfield	0.43	0.69	Dead End	Troywood Road	SR 684 (Mount Herman Road)	
Dinwiddie	6.92	11.14	Dead End	Cox Road	US 460 (Cox Road)	
Fairfax	0.88	1.42	Dead End	Kentland Drive	SR 602 (Seneca Road)	
Fauquier	1.00	1.61	Dead End	Belcoir Road	SR 668 (Savannah Branch Road)	
Franklin	2.55	4.10	SR 602 (Ferrum Mountain Road)	Whetstone Road Running Brook Road Swenfield Road	SR 640 (Five Mile Mountain Road)	Gap between segments ending at different points along SR 752 Gap between segments ending at different points along SR 750
Frederick	0.73	1.17	US 50 (Northwestern Pike)	Gore Road	US 50 (Northwestern Pike)	
Halifax	6.00	9.66	SR 699 (Wilkins Road/Mount Caramel Road)	Piney Grove Road Storys Creek Road	SR 658 (Melon Road)	
Hanover	1.00	1.61	US 33 (Mountain Road)	Burnham Davis Road	Dead End	
Henry	2.13	3.43	SR 57 (Chatham Road)	Elijah Circle	SR 57 (Chatham Road)	
James City	0.53	0.85	SR 746	Mount Laurel Road	Dead End	
Loudoun	1.50	2.41	SR 719 (Stony Point Road)	Cider Mill Road	SR 9 (Charles Town Pike)	
Louisa	0.52	0.84	US 522 (Zachary Taylor Highway)	Hancock Mill Road	Dead End	
Mecklenburg	0.90	1.45	Dead End	Golf Drive	SR 619/SR 903	
Montgomery	0.07	0.11	SR 738 (Blair Street)	Grim Street	SR 739 (Gallimore Street)	
Pittsylvania	9.91	15.95	SR 626/SR 782	Grassland Drive	SR 40 (Gretna Road)	
Prince William	1.76	2.83	Dead End	Token Forest Drive Websters Way	SR 2385 (Lost Creek Court)	Gap between SR 3482 and SR 642
Pulaski	0.19	0.31	Dead End	Davis Road	SR 611 (Newbern Road)	
Roanoke	0.14	0.23	SR 776	Rock Hill Drive	Dead End	
Rockbridge	0.17	0.27	Dead End	High Water Lane	SR 631 (Big Spring Drive)	
Rockingham	0.40	0.64	Dead End	Rumsey Lane	SR 742 (Waggys Creek Road)	
Scott	0.10	0.16	SR 704 (East Charles Valley Road)	Unnamed road	Dead End	
Shenandoah	0.06	0.10	SR 616 (Ridge Road)	Village Lane	Dead End	
Stafford	1.64	2.64	SR 1264 (Parkway Boulevard)	Northampton Boulevard Eustace Road	SR 610 (Garrisonville Road)	
Tazewell	0.21	0.34	SR 67 (Raven Road)	Flea Market Road	SR 67 (Raven Road)	
Washington	6.92	11.14	Dead End	Killmachronan Drive Fleet Road Seven Springs Road Forest Hills Drive	SR 750 (Old Mill Road)	Gap between segments ending at different points along SR 91
Wise	0.10	0.16	SR 68	Juniper Street	Dead End	
York	0.57	0.92	US 17 (George Washington Memorial Highway)	Ella Taylor Road	SR 614 (Showalter Road)	
