= Virginia State Route 690 =

State highway in Virginia, United States

State Route 690

Route information
- Maintained by VDOT

Location
- Country: United States
- State: Virginia

Highway system
- Virginia Routes; Interstate; US; Primary; Secondary; Byways; History; HOT lanes

State Route 690 (SR 690) in the U.S. state of Virginia is a secondary route designation applied to multiple discontinuous road segments among the many counties. The list below describes the sections in each county that are designated SR 690.

== List ==
County	Length (mi)	Length (km)	From	Via	To	Notes
Accomack	2.60	4.18	SR 692 (Savannah Road)	Whites Crossing Road	SR 687 (Bethel Church Road)	
Albemarle	4.51	7.26	SR 796 (Brookville Road)	Newtown Road Greenwood Station Road	US 250 (Rockfish Gap Turnpike)	
Alleghany	0.26	0.42	SR 647 (Mallow Road)	Hattie Street	SR 792 (Jacob Street)	
Amelia	0.70	1.13	Dead End	Gregory Mill Road	SR 600 (Burton Road)	
Amherst	1.09	1.75	SR 689 (East Monitor Road)	Huff Creek Trail	Dead End	
Appomattox	0.20	0.32	SR 683 (Lime Plant Road)	Quarry Road	Dead End	
Augusta	2.50	4.02	SR 698 (Wise Hollow Road/Summit Church Road)	Summit Church Road	Rockingham County line	
Bath	0.11	0.18	SR 39 (Mountain Valley Road)	Windy Cove Road	SR 678 (Indian Draft Road)	
Bedford	1.93	3.11	SR 755 (Union Church Road)	Nester Road	SR 689 (Irving Road)	
Bland	0.30	0.48	SR 660 (ML Thompson Drive)	ML Thompson Drive	Dead End	
Botetourt	2.18	3.51	SR 625 (Trebork Road)	Buttons Bluff	Dead End	
Brunswick	3.95	6.36	SR 670 (Western Mill Road)	Moore Farm Drive	SR 672 (Triplett Road)	
Buchanan	1.50	2.41	SR 638 (Dismal River Road)	Harrys Branch Road	Dead End	
Buckingham	1.92	3.09	US 60 (James Anderson Highway)	Lee Wayside Road High School Road	US 60 (James Anderson Highway)	
Campbell	3.40	5.47	SR 622 (Lynbrook Road)	Clarks Road	SR 688 (Patterson Road)	
Caroline	2.70	4.35	SR 652 (Ruther Glen Road)	Old CC Road	SR 656 (Day Bridge Road)	
Carroll	3.20	5.15	SR 620 (Old Pipers Gap Road)	Brushy Fork Road	US 52 (Fancy Gap Highway)	
Charles City	0.19	0.31	Cul-de-Sac	Unnamed road	SR 156	
Charlotte	0.53	0.85	Dead End	Little Retreat Road	US 15 (Barnesville Highway)	
Chesterfield	0.90	1.45	SR 667 (Otterdale Road)	Cosby Road	US 360 (Hull Street Road)	
Clarke	0.57	0.92	Dead End	Manor Road	SR 638 (Howellsville Road)	
Craig	0.38	0.61	Dead End	Maggie Maw Lane	SR 616	
Culpeper	0.09	0.14	US 15 (James Madison Highway)	Louise Lane	Dead End	
Cumberland	11.36	18.28	SR 45 (Cartersville Road)	Columbia Road	Buckingham County line	
Dickenson	1.00	1.61	SR 631 (Brush Creek Road)	Unnamed road	Dead End	
Dinwiddie	0.94	1.51	SR 631 (Claiborne Road)	Harris Drive	Dead End	
Essex	0.15	0.24	SR 603 (Monte Verde Road)	Box Factory Lane	Dead End	
Fairfax	2.11	3.40	SR 693 (Westmoreland Street)	Old Chesterbrook Road Park Road Vermont Avenue	SR 691 (Massachusetts Avenue)	Gap between segments ending at different points along SR 695
Fauquier	4.42	7.11	Warrenton town limits	Bear Wallow Road Cannonball Gate Road	SR 787	Gap between segments ending at different points along SR 628
Floyd	3.30	5.31	SR 860 (Shooting Creek Road)	Sandy Flats Road	SR 679 (Poor Farm Road)	
Fluvanna	0.20	0.32	Cumberland County line	Columbia Road	SR 6/SR 667 (Old Columbia Road)	
Franklin	0.78	1.26	SR 767 (Prillaman Switch Road)	Pembroke Road	Dead End	
Frederick	1.90	3.06	SR 600 (Siler Road)	Howards Chapel Road	SR 671 (Shockeysville Road)	
Giles	0.70	1.13	SR 100 (Pulaski Giles Turnpike)	Carr Farm Road	Dead End	
Gloucester	0.18	0.29	SR 623 (Ware Neck Road)	Flat Iron Road	Dead End	
Goochland	0.35	0.56	Dead End	Springfield Road	SR 614 (Dogtown Road)	
Grayson	0.30	0.48	Dead End	Tarny Wood Lane	SR 706 (Penn Ford Lane)	
Greene	0.22	0.35	US 33/SR 1103	Business Park Drive	Cul-de-Sac	
Greensville	0.80	1.29	US 301 (Skippers Road)	Morgan Road	US 301 (Skippers Road)	
Halifax	1.80	2.90	SR 603 (Cody Road)	Handy Bottom Trail	Dead End	
Hanover	1.15	1.85	SR 738 (Old Ridge Road)	Lucas Road	SR 694 (Breedens Road)	
Henry	2.01	3.23	Dead End	Fall Creek Road	SR 692 (Horsepasture Price Road)	
Isle of Wight	1.70	2.74	US 460 (Pruden Boulevard)	Ennis Mill Road	SR 606 (Five Forks Road)	
James City	0.10	0.16	Cul-de-Sac	Commons Way	SR 676 (Farmville Lane)	
King and Queen	0.26	0.42	Dead End	Dudley Ferry Road	SR 661 (Brookshire Road)	
King George	0.16	0.26	SR 3 (Kings Highway)	Luther Lane	Dead End	
Lancaster	0.70	1.13	SR 622 (Morattico Road)	Norwood Church Road	Dead End	
Lee	6.89	11.09	Tennessee state line	Kesterson Road Doc Hurst Road Caylor Road	US 58 (Daniel Boone Trail)	
Loudoun	15.80	25.43	SR 611 (Saint Louis Road)/SR 734	Silcott Springs Road Hillsboro Road Mountain Road	SR 673 (Irish Corner Road)	Gap between segments ending at different points along the Purcellville town limits Gap between segments ending at different points along SR 9
Louisa	1.87	3.01	SR 614 (Carrs Bridge Lane)	Burruss Mill Road	Cul-de-Sac	
Lunenburg	7.10	11.43	SR 49 (Courthouse Road)	Davis Low Grand Road	SR 40 (Lunenburg County Road)	
Madison	0.55	0.89	SR 662 (Graves Mill Road)	Hollowback Lane	Dead End	
Mathews	0.37	0.60	SR 642 (Fitchetts Wharf Road)	Field Point Road	Dead End	
Mecklenburg	1.20	1.93	Dead End	Farmington Road	Dead End	
Middlesex	1.42	2.29	Dead End	Coach Point Road	SR 629 (Stormont Road)	
Montgomery	1.00	1.61	Dead End	Kirk Hollow Road	SR 637 (Alleghany Springs Road)	
Nelson	0.30	0.48	Dead End	Fish Hatchery Lane	SR 56	
New Kent	0.10	0.16	SR 606 (Old Church Road)	Tunstall Station Road	Dead End	
Northampton	0.50	0.80	SR 600 (Seaside Road)	Poplar Grove Road	Dead End	
Northumberland	0.60	0.97	SR 669 (Apple Grove Road)	Cobbs Hall Lane	Dead End	
Nottoway	0.20	0.32	US 460 Bus (Old Nottoway Road)	Echo Lane	Dead End	
Orange	0.69	1.11	SR 643 (Cox Mill Road)	Black Level Road	US 15 (James Madison Highway)	
Page	0.60	0.97	Dead End	Unnamed road	SR 629	
Patrick	2.55	4.10	SR 686 (Tudor Orchard Road)	Open Meadow Drive Taylor View Drive	SR 680 (Spring Road)	
Pittsylvania	1.70	2.74	SR 683 (South Meadows Road)	Coles Road	SR 685 (Chalk Level Road)	
Prince Edward	1.30	2.09	SR 652 (Harris Creek Road)	Plum Creek Road	SR 651 (Chinquapin Road)	
Prince William	0.20	0.32	Dead End	Hershey Drive	SR 646 (Aden Road)	
Pulaski	2.60	4.18	SR 605 (Little River Dam Road)	Shelburne Road	SR 605 (Little River Dam Road)	
Rappahannock	0.14	0.23	Dead End	Unnamed road	SR 622 (Gidbrown Hollow Road)	
Richmond	7.33	11.80	SR 3 Bus	Menokin Road	Westmoreland County line	
Roanoke	9.26	14.90	US 221 (Bent Mountain Road)	Fortune Ridge Road Sugar Camp Creek Road Poage Valley Road Rose Lawn Road Unnamed road Two Ford Road	Dead End	Gap between segments ending at different points along SR 612
Rockbridge	2.53	4.07	SR 610 (Plank Road)	Padgett's Hill Road	SR 686 (Herring Hill Road)	
Rockingham	0.97	1.56	Dead End	Captain Shands Road Summit Church Road	Augusta County line	
Russell	0.60	0.97	Dead End	Russian Road	SR 640 (Reeds Valley Road)	
Scott	0.42	0.68	SR 689 (Jett Gap Ford Road/Ann Goode Cooper Road)	Unnamed road	SR 614 (A P Carter Highway)	
Shenandoah	0.62	1.00	Dead End	Hotteltown Lane	SR 717 (Alum Springs Road)	
Smyth	1.75	2.82	SR 689 (Hutton Branch Road)	Rice Road Bales Lane	US 11 (Lee Highway)	
Southampton	1.10	1.77	SR 189 (South Quay Road)	Bethany School Road	US 258 (Smith Ferry Road)	
Spotsylvania	1.00	1.61	Dead End	Peppertree Road	SR 600 (Herndon Road)	
Stafford	1.83	2.95	SR 602 (Chapel Green Road)	Chapel Green Road Sandy Ridge Road	Dead End	
Tazewell	0.50	0.80	SR 658 (Rosenbraun Road)	Grose Road	Dead End	
Warren	0.24	0.39	SR 55 (Strasburg Road)	Unnamed road	Dead End	
Washington	2.00	3.22	US 19 (Porterfield Highway)	Hidden Valley Road	Dead End	
Westmoreland	1.69	2.72	Richmond County line	Menokin Road	SR 3 (Kings Highway)	
Wise	0.52	0.84	SR 813 (Old Norton Coeburn Road)	Prospect Avenue	SR 646 (Coeburn Mountain Road)	
Wythe	9.49	15.27	SR 625 (Crockett Road)/SR 674 (Ridge Lane)	Scenic Trail Cripple Creek Road Slate Spring Branch Road	SR 642 (Mule Hell Road)	
York	0.61	0.98	Dead End	Commons Way Palace Lane	SR 643 (Caran Road)	
