= Virginia State Route 686 =

State highway in Virginia, United States

State Route 686

Route information
- Maintained by VDOT

Location
- Country: United States
- State: Virginia

Highway system
- Virginia Routes; Interstate; US; Primary; Secondary; Byways; History; HOT lanes

State Route 686 (SR 686) in the U.S. state of Virginia is a secondary route designation applied to multiple discontinuous road segments among the many counties. The list below describes the sections in each county that are designated SR 686.

== List ==
County	Length (mi)	Length (km)	From	Via	To	Notes
Accomack	0.50	0.80	SR 685 (Gladding Landing Road)	Dividing Road	SR 688 (Cattail Road)	
Albemarle	1.80	2.90	SR 600 (Campbell Road)	Saint Andrew Chapel Lane	Louisa County line	
Alleghany	0.10	0.16	Dead End	Spring Church Road	SR 687 (Jackson River Road)	
Amelia	0.95	1.53	SR 673 (Foster Lane)	Wendy Lane	Dead End	
Amherst	3.71	5.97	Dead End	Stinnet Road Mount Horeb Road	US 60 (Lexington Turnpike)	
Appomattox	0.70	1.13	SR 663 (Oak Ridge Road)	Bear Branch Road	SR 615 (Liberty Chapel Road)	
Augusta	0.62	1.00	SR 694 (Swartzel Shop Road)	Hilltop Drive	Dead End	
Bath	0.08	0.13	Dead End	Wildwood Lane	SR 39 (Mountain Valley Road)	
Bedford	3.78	6.08	SR 692 (Cool Springs Road)	Taylor Mountain Road	SR 688 (Buffalo Run Road)	
Botetourt	1.07	1.72	SR 615 (Craig Creek Road)	Bessemer Lane	Dead End	
Brunswick	5.21	8.38	SR 623 (Browns Creek Road)	Fort Hill Road	SR 46 (Christanna Highway)	
Buchanan	0.23	0.37	SR 83	Booth Branch Road	SR 83	
Buckingham	1.00	1.61	Dead End	Glenn Road	US 15 (James Madison Highway)	
Campbell	5.80	9.33	US 29 (Wards Road)	Browns Mill Road	US 501 (Brookneal Highway)	
Caroline	1.08	1.74	US 17 (Tidewater Trail)	Camden Road	Dead End	
Carroll	2.83	4.55	US 52 (Fancy Gap Highway)	Epworth Road	SR 679 (Wards Gap Road)	
Charlotte	1.20	1.93	SR 602/SR 609	Roseland Road	SR 607 (West Spring Hill Road)	
Chesterfield	1.93	3.11	SR 1964 (Winslow Road)	Brown Summitt Road Jahnke Road	Richmond city limits	
Craig	0.35	0.56	SR 615 (Craigs Creek Road)	Unnamed road	SR 615 (Craigs Creek Road)	
Culpeper	1.75	2.82	US 15 (James Madison Highway)	Lovers Lane	US 522 (Zachary Taylor Highway)	
Cumberland	3.70	5.95	SR 610 (Duncan Store Road)	White Road Cedar Plains Road	SR 690 (Columbia Road)	
Dickenson	0.60	0.97	SR 611 (Blowing Rock Road)	Branaham Farm Lane	Dead End	
Dinwiddie	0.20	0.32	SR 673 (Smith Grove Road)	Smith Grove Lane	Dead End	
Essex	0.30	0.48	SR 662 (Harris Hill Road)	Old Wagon Road	Dead End	
Fairfax	1.67	2.69	SR 694 (Lewinsville Road)	Balls Hill Road	SR 193 (Georgetown Pike)	
Fauquier	2.10	3.38	SR 628 (Logans Mill Road/Landmark Road)	Landmark Road	SR 629 (Bull Run Mountain Road)	
Floyd	4.47	7.19	SR 615 (Christiansburg Pike)	Moore Road	SR 679 (Bethlehem Church Road)	
Fluvanna	0.50	0.80	SR 608 (Rising Sun Road)	Harris Lane	Dead End	
Franklin	2.55	4.10	SR 684 (Boones Mill Road)	White Oak Road	SR 687 (Alean Road)	
Frederick	0.57	0.92	Dead End	Russell Road	SR 661 (Welltown Road)	
Giles	0.26	0.42	Dead End	Bobwhite Lane	SR 618 (Collins Avenue)	
Gloucester	0.50	0.80	SR 614 (Robins Neck Road)	Roanes Wharf Road	Dead End	
Goochland	0.85	1.37	Dead End	New Town Road	SR 600 (Rock Castle Road)	
Grayson	2.10	3.38	SR 685 (Powerhouse Road)	Forest Ridge Road Mountain Breeze Lane	Dead End	Gap between segments ending at different points along SR 654
Halifax	1.90	3.06	SR 689 (Wooding Road)	Mercy Seat Road	Dead End	
Hanover	4.40	7.08	SR 54 (Patrick Henry Road)	Horseshoe Bridge Road Campbell Lake Road	SR 685 (Scotchtown Road)	Gap between segments ending at different points along SR 795
Henry	0.60	0.97	Dead End	Ravenswood Lane New Light Church Road	Dead End	Gap between segments ending at different points along SR 641
Isle of Wight	1.30	2.09	Dead End	Tylers Beach Road	SR 676 (Fort Huger Drive)	
James City	0.13	0.21	SR 143 (Merrimac Trail)	Wallace Road	York County line	
King and Queen	0.06	0.10	Dead End	Ashby Road	SR 33 (Lewis Puller Memorial Highway)	
King George	1.21	1.95	SR 3 (Kings Highway)	Mount Rose Drive	SR 3 (Kings Highway)	
Lancaster	0.04	0.06	SR 3 (Mary Ball Road)	Mary Ball Place	SR 3 (Mary Ball Road)	
Lee	1.05	1.69	SR 687 (Frog Level Road)	Brooks Memorial Drive	SR 685 (Lick Branch Road)	
Loudoun	1.00	1.61	Dead End	Sawmill Road	SR 671 (Harpers Ferry Road)	
Louisa	2.00	3.22	Albemarle County line	Paddock Wood Road	SR 615 (Columbia Road)	
Lunenburg	1.40	2.25	Dead End	Powers Road	SR 637 (Craig Mill Road)	
Madison	0.04	0.06	SR 230 (Orange Road)/SR 231 (Blue Ridge Turnpike)	Fairgrounds Road Connector	SR 687 (Fairgrounds Road)	
Mathews	0.33	0.53	Dead End	Riverview Road	SR 605 (Old Creek House Road)	
Mecklenburg	2.90	4.67	SR 688 (Skipwith Road)	Esnon Road	SR 92	
Middlesex	0.55	0.89	SR 622 (Dirt Bridge Road)	Millers Road	Dead End	
Montgomery	0.35	0.56	SR 622 (Reesdale Road)	Trooper Lane	SR 622 (Reesdale Road)	
Nelson	4.90	7.89	Rockbridge County line	Painter Mountain Lane Zink Mill School Road Bradley Lane	Augusta County line	Gap between segments ending at different points along SR 56 Gap between segments ending at different points along SR 685
New Kent	0.18	0.29	SR 612 (Terminal Road)	Terminal Road	Dead End	
Northampton	0.30	0.48	Dead End	Kellam Drive	SR 677 (Prettyman Circle)	
Northumberland	0.47	0.76	Dead End	Pebble Road	SR 665 (Millpoint Drive)	
Nottoway	0.55	0.89	SR 627 (Dobbins Bridge Road)	Barnes Lane	Dead End	
Orange	0.80	1.29	US 15 (James Madison Highway)	Thoroughbred Road	US 15 (James Madison Highway)	
Page	0.25	0.40	US 340	Smeltzers Road	SR 662 (Compton Hollow Road)	
Patrick	2.38	3.83	US 58 (Jeb Stuart Highway)	Tudor Orchard Road	SR 687 (Bull Mountain Road/Tudor Orchard Road)	
Pittsylvania	13.49	21.71	SR 40 (Gretna Road)	Zion Road Markham Road Elkhorn Road	SR 680 (Chanceys Store Road)	Gap between segments ending at different points along SR 685 Gap between segments ending at different points along SR 640
Prince Edward	3.25	5.23	SR 666 (Douglas Church Road)	Allen Farm Road	SR 604 (Abilene Road)	
Prince George	1.31	2.11	Dead End	Mount Hope Road	SR 636 (Lawyers Road)	
Prince William	1.88	3.03	US 15 (James Madison Highway)	Ingram Drive	SR 701 (Logmill Road)	
Pulaski	0.46	0.74	SR 693 (Julia Simpkins Road)	Eanes Ferry Road	Dead End	
Rappahannock	0.28	0.45	SR 610 (Chester Gap Road)	Blue Ridge Avenue	Dead End	
Richmond	0.15	0.24	SR 697 (Indianfield Road)	Pocahontas Drive	US 360/FR-815	
Roanoke	1.93	3.11	Dead End	Grandin Road Extension	SR 419 (Electric Road)	
Rockbridge	1.66	2.67	Dead End	Parsons Lane Herring Hall Road	US 11 (Lee Highway)	
Rockingham	0.60	0.97	SR 689 (Shen Lake Drive)	Woods Road	SR 276 (Cross Keys Road)	
Russell	1.10	1.77	SR 71	Bearwallow Road	SR 609 (Bearwallow Road)	
Scott	1.40	2.25	SR 671 (Twin Springs Road)	Raccoon Road	SR 754 (Bethel Road/Culbertson Branch Road)	
Shenandoah	5.72	9.21	SR 614 (South Middle Road)	Ox Road	Woodstock town limits	Gap between segments ending at different points along SR 675 Gap between segments ending at different points along SR 605
Smyth	4.66	7.50	SR 688 (Dry Run Road)	Gordon Place Drive Adkins Tank Road	Dead End	Gap between segments ending at different points along SR 622
Southampton	5.97	9.61	SR 680	Raiver Dale Drive Unnamed road	North Carolina state line	
Spotsylvania	0.16	0.26	US 1 (Jefferson Davis Highway)	Lee Street	US 1 Bus	
Stafford	0.14	0.23	SR 744 (Rumford Road)	May Street	SR 680 (Leonard Street)	
Sussex	0.60	0.97	Dead End	Spiers Road	SR 698 (Sandy Field Road)	
Tazewell	0.50	0.80	SR 631 (Baptist Valley Road)	Lick Branch Road	SR 636 (McGuire Valley Road)	
Warren	0.05	0.08	Dead End	Pinkett Lane	SR 684	
Washington	1.93	3.11	Dead End	Moore Creek Road	SR 746 (Blackwell Chapel Road)	Gap between segments ending at different points along SR 745
Westmoreland	2.40	3.86	SR 347 (Westmoreland State Park Road)	Unnamed road Cliff Road	Cul-de-Sac	
Wise	2.40	3.86	Dead End	Unnamed road	SR 78	
Wythe	1.30	2.09	Dead End	Gullion Fork Road	US 52 (Stoney Fork Road)	
York	1.14	1.83	SR 622 (Seaford Road)	Cheadle Loop Road	SR 622 (Seaford Road)	
