= Virginia State Route 740 =

Secondary route designation

State Route 740

Route information
- Maintained by VDOT

Location
- Country: United States
- State: Virginia

Highway system
- Virginia Routes; Interstate; US; Primary; Secondary; Byways; History; HOT lanes

State Route 740 (SR 740) in the U.S. state of Virginia is a secondary route designation applied to multiple discontinuous road segments among the many counties. The list below describes the sections in each county that are designated SR 740.

== List ==
County	Length (mi)	Length (km)	From	Via	To	Notes
Accomack	0.90	1.45	SR 605	Oyster House Road	Dead End	
Albemarle	1.00	1.61	SR 22 (Louisa Road)	Zion Hill Road	SR 231 (Gordonsville Road)	
Amherst	0.30	0.48	Dead End	Tyree Circle	SR 833 (Old Wright Shop Road)	
Augusta	0.70	1.13	Dead End	Homes Lane	SR 742 (Shutterlee Mill Road)	
Bedford	0.92	1.48	Dead End	Patmos Church Road	SR 608 (Tolers Ferry Road)	
Botetourt	1.00	1.61	Roanoke County line	Carvins Cove Road	Dead End	
Campbell	1.00	1.61	SR 626 (Johnson Mountain Road)	Orrix Creek Road	Dead End	
Carroll	6.68	10.75	SR 635 (Fowlers Ferry Road/Pot Rock Road)	Oak Grove Road Rescue Road Rotenizer Drive	US 52 (Poplar Camp Road)	Gap between segments ending at different points along SR 743 Gap between segments ending at different points along SR 745 Gap between segments ending at different points along SR 620
Chesterfield	0.35	0.56	Dead End	Berrand Road	SR 653 (Courthouse Road)	
Dinwiddie	1.50	2.41	SR 627 (Courthouse Road)	Turkey Egg Road	US 1 (Boydton Plank Road)	
Fairfax	0.79	1.27	SR 236 (Little River Turnpike)	Brookside Drive	SR 620 (Braddock Road)	
Fauquier	0.50	0.80	SR 721 (State Road)	Mount Nebo Church Road	Dead End	
Franklin	3.90	6.28	SR 739 (Gap Gate Road)	Algoma Road	SR 641 (Callaway Road)	
Frederick	0.15	0.24	SR 642 (Tasker Road)	Queens Way	SR 756	
Halifax	5.12	8.24	North Carolina state line	Christie Road Wilson Road	SR 602 (North Fork Church Road)	
Hanover	0.97	1.56	SR 685 (Scotchtown Road)	Chiswell Lane	Dead End	
Henry	0.56	0.90	SR 666 (Trenthill Road)	Rosemont Road	Dead End	
James City	0.15	0.24	SR 672 (Carriage Road)	Alesa Drive	SR 741 (Debra Drive)	
Loudoun	1.60	2.57	Dead End	Tutt Lane	US 15 (James Monroe Highway)	
Louisa	0.25	0.40	Dead End	Desper Road	SR 632 (Waldrop Church Road)	
Mecklenburg	1.00	1.61	SR 723 (Shiney Rock Road)	Red Store Road	Dead End	
Montgomery	0.27	0.43	SR 626 (Lafayette Road/Gardner Road)	Wells Street	SR 626 (Lafayette Road)	
Pittsylvania	1.81	2.91	SR 724 (Mill Creek Road)	Iris Lane	SR 743 (Orphanage Road)	
Prince William	1.04	1.67	SR 1238 (Brice Street)	Armstead Street	Dead End	Gap between SR 1237 and a dead end
Pulaski	0.03	0.05	US 11 (Lee Highway)	Warden Court	SR 742 (Warden Court)	
Roanoke	3.67	5.91	SR 311 (Catawba Valley Drive)	Carvins Cover Road	Botetourt County line	
Rockbridge	0.20	0.32	SR 850 (Midland Trail)	Kerr's Creek Lane	Dead End	
Rockingham	0.50	0.80	Dead End	Honeyville Road	SR 881 (Orchard Drive)	
Scott	0.07	0.11	SR 739 (Charleston Street)	Ernest Street	SR 738 (Kermit Road)	
Shenandoah	0.63	1.01	US 11 (Old Valley Pike)	Toll House Road	US 11 (Old Valley Pike)	
Spotsylvania	0.09	0.14	Dead End	Wrights Lane	SR 3 (Plank Road)	
Stafford	0.15	0.24	SR 744 (Rumford Road)	Maple Street	SR 680 (Leonard Street)	
Tazewell	0.15	0.24	SR 650 (Wrights Valley Road)	Gulfport Drive	Dead End	
Washington	7.59	12.21	Abingdon town limits	Old Saltworks Road Robindale Road Tobias Drive	SR 737 (College Drive)	Gap between segments ending at different points along SR 80
Wise	0.41	0.66	Dead End	Unnamed road	SR 632	
York	0.05	0.08	SR 717 (Old Landing Road)	Cove Court	Dead End	
