= Virginia State Route 741 =

Secondary route designation

State Route 741

Route information
- Maintained by VDOT

Location
- Country: United States
- State: Virginia

Highway system
- Virginia Routes; Interstate; US; Primary; Secondary; Byways; History; HOT lanes

State Route 741 (SR 741) in the U.S. state of Virginia is a secondary route designation applied to multiple discontinuous road segments among the many counties. The list below describes the sections in each county that are designated SR 741.

== List ==
County	Length (mi)	Length (km)	From	Via	To	Notes
Accomack	0.87	1.40	SR 180 (Wachapreague Road)	Ole Road	SR 180 (Wachapreague Road)	
Albemarle	0.40	0.64	SR 649 (Proffit Road)	Mossing Ford Road	Dead End	
Amherst	0.60	0.97	SR 713 (Saint Marys Road)	Angus Drive	Dead End	
Augusta	1.40	2.25	SR 739 (Moffet Branch Road)	Old Quarry Road	SR 607 (Mount Solon Road)	
Bedford	1.80	2.90	US 460/US 221 (Lynchburg Salem Turnpike)	Beale Trail Road	SR 695 (Goose Creek Valley Road)	
Botetourt	0.25	0.40	SR 636 (Little Timber Ridge Road)	Bear Wallow Road	Dead End	
Carroll	2.70	4.35	Dead End	Sharp Road Porterfield Road Stoneman Road	SR 742 (McGhee Road)	
Chesterfield	0.40	0.64	Dead End	Unnamed road	SR 627 (Woodpecker Road)	
Dinwiddie	0.70	1.13	SR 613 (Squirrel Level Road)	Fort Emory Road	SR 675 (Vaughan Road)	
Fairfax	0.18	0.29	SR 637 (Accotink Road)	Newington Road	SR 611 (Telegraph Road)	
Fauquier	2.80	4.51	SR 738 (Wilson Road)	Enon School Road	Dead End	
Franklin	0.65	1.05	SR 643 (Dillons Mill Road)	Flanders Road	Dead End	
Frederick	0.15	0.24	Dead End	Hodges Lane	SR 671 (Green Spring Road)	
Halifax	4.64	7.47	SR 602 (North Fork Church Road)	Lowery Road Wallace Cole Road	SR 744 (East Hyco Road)	
Hanover	0.70	1.13	Dead End	Little Egypt Road	SR 657 (Ashcake Road)	
Henry	0.80	1.29	SR 628 (Blue Knob Road)	Al-Dana Road Hatchers Farm Road	SR 628 (Blue Knob Road)	Gap between dead ends
James City	0.09	0.14	SR 672 (Carriage Road)	Debra Drive	SR 740 (Alesa Drive)	
Loudoun	0.07	0.11	Cul-de-Sac	Markey Court	SR 634 (Moran Road)	
Louisa	1.30	2.09	Dead End	Walnut Shade Road	US 33 (Louisa Road)	
Mecklenburg	0.90	1.45	Dead End	Twin Drive	SR 47	
Montgomery	0.90	1.45	SR 631 (Brake Road)	Coles Road	Dead End	
Pittsylvania	2.20	3.54	SR 782 (Fruitridge Drive)	Friendly Drive	SR 782 (Fruitridge Drive)	
Prince William	0.45	0.72	SR 1220 (Baxter Street)	G Street	SR 906 (Occoquan Road)	
Pulaski	0.04	0.06	SR 742 (Warden Court)	Warden Court	US 11 (Lee Highway)	
Rockbridge	0.40	0.64	SR 622	Unnamed road	Dead End	
Rockingham	0.60	0.97	SR 742 (Robinson Road/Fox Den Road)	Robinson Road	Dead End	
Scott	0.20	0.32	SR 71	Pond Hill Road	Dead End	
Shenandoah	0.50	0.80	SR 623 (Back Road)	Cottontown Road	SR 55 (John Marshall Highway)	
Spotsylvania	0.02	0.03	SR 740 (Wrights Lane)	Wrights Lane	SR 3 (Plank Road)	
Stafford	0.30	0.48	SR 627 (Mountain View Road)	Wood Road	Dead End	
Tazewell	0.25	0.40	West Virginia state line	Rodriguez Street	Dead End	
Washington	3.87	6.23	SR 742 (Logan Creek Road)	Fudge Road Maiden Creek Road Finley Lane	Dead End	Gap between segments ending at different points along SR 703
Wise	0.20	0.32	SR 757 (Norton Coeburn Road)	Unnamed road	Dead End	
York	0.24	0.39	SR 622 (Seaford Road)	Wornom Drive	SR 627 (Woods Road)	
