= Virginia State Route 743 =

Road route in Virginia, United States

State Route 743

Route information
- Maintained by VDOT

Location
- Country: United States
- State: Virginia

Highway system
- Virginia Routes; Interstate; US; Primary; Secondary; Byways; History; HOT lanes

State Route 743 (SR 743) in Virginia, United States is a secondary route designation applied to multiple discontinuous road segments across 35 counties. The list below describes the sections in each county that are designated SR 743.

== List ==
| County | Length (mi) | Length (km) | From | Via | To | Notes |
|---|---|---|---|---|---|---|
| Accomack | 1.30 | 2.09 | SR 600 (Seaside Road) | Unnamed road | SR 622 (Trower Road/Piggin Road) | |
| Albemarle | 13.34 | 21.47 | US 29 (Seminole Trail) | Hydraulic Road Earlysville Road Advance Mills Road | Greene County line | |
| Amherst | 0.50 | 0.80 | Dead End | Lavender Lane | SR 615 (Sardis Road) | |
| Augusta | 1.20 | 1.93 | SR 612 (Quicks Mill Road) | Berry Road Catheys River Road | SR 742 (Lebanon Church Road) | Gap between dead ends |
| Bedford | 2.20 | 3.54 | SR 654 (Feldspar Road) | Bold Branch Road | SR 805 (Stone Mountain Road) | |
| Botetourt | 2.65 | 4.26 | SR 615 (Craig Creek Road) | Draft Road | Dead End | |
| Carroll | 9.85 | 15.85 | US 58 (Carrollton Pike) | Airport Road Oak Grove Road Pleasant View Road | US 52 (Poplar Camp Road) | Gap between segments ending at different points along SR 620 Gap between segments ending at different points along SR 740 |
| Chesterfield | 1.80 | 2.90 | Dead End | Richland Road Burnette Road | SR 649 (Newbys Bridge Road) | |
| Dinwiddie | 0.57 | 0.92 | US 460 (Cox Road) | Hart Road | SR 601 (River Road) | |
| Fairfax | 1.94 | 3.12 | Cul-de-Sac | Carpers Farm Way Colvin Run Road Delta Glen Court | Dead End | |
| Fauquier | 2.36 | 3.80 | Dead End | Bears Den Road | SR 688 (Leeds Manor Road) | |
| Franklin | 0.45 | 0.72 | SR 739 (Bethlehem Road) | London Ridge Road | SR 742 (Dugspur Road) | |
| Frederick | 0.60 | 0.97 | Dead End | Flint Ridge Lane | SR 600 (Hayfield Road) | |
| Halifax | 2.20 | 3.54 | SR 744 (East Hyco Road) | Ponderosa Road | SR 742 (Alphonse Dairy Road) | |
| Hanover | 0.26 | 0.42 | Dead End | Carters Heights Road | SR 802 (Lewistown Road) | |
| Henry | 1.30 | 2.09 | SR 657 (Dyers Store Road) | Senerity Drive | Dead End | |
| James City | 0.07 | 0.11 | Cul-de-Sac | Williams Circle | York County line | |
| Loudoun | 7.02 | 11.30 | SR 619 (Trappe Road) | Millville Road Welbourne Road Millville Road | SR 744 (Snake Hill Road) | Gap between segments ending at different pointsalong SR 623 |
| Louisa | 1.00 | 1.61 | SR 605 (Shannon Hill Road) | Ambler Road | Dead End | |
| Mecklenburg | 0.70 | 1.13 | SR 660 (Old Cox Road) | Meherrin Road | Dead End | |
| Montgomery | 0.21 | 0.34 | Dead End | Hastings Road | SR 639 (Mount Pleasant Road) | |
| Pittsylvania | 3.65 | 5.87 | SR 746 (Golf Club Road) | Orphanage Road | SR 41 (Franklin Turnpike) | |
| Prince William | 0.46 | 0.74 | Dead End | F Street | SR 906 (Occoquan Road) | |
| Pulaski | 0.25 | 0.40 | Dead End | Tabernacle Place | SR 636 (Alum Springs Road) | |
| Roanoke | 0.48 | 0.77 | SR 625 (Hershberger Road) | John Richardson Road | SR 115 (Plantation Road) | |
| Rockbridge | 1.47 | 2.37 | US 11 (Lee Highway) | Family Barger Road Buck Hill Road Rices Hill Road | SR 686 (Parsons Lane/Herring Hall Road) | |
| Rockingham | 4.57 | 7.35 | SR 742 (Fox Den Road/Union Springs Road) | Union Springs Road Honey Run Road | SR 738 (Dry River Road) | Gap between segments ending at different points along SR 613 |
| Scott | 0.30 | 0.48 | Dead End | Crow Hollow Lane | SR 610 | |
| Shenandoah | 0.32 | 0.51 | SR 1328 (Railroad Street) | Shenandoah Street | US 11 (Main Street) | |
| Spotsylvania | 0.79 | 1.27 | Dead End | Lewis Thorburn Road | SR 610 (Old Plank Road) | |
| Stafford | 0.13 | 0.21 | SR 744 (Rumford Road) | Mimosa Street | SR 680 (Leonard Street) | |
| Tazewell | 0.12 | 0.19 | SR 607 (Little Tumbling Creek Road) | Unnamed road | SR 601 (Freestone Valley Road) | |
| Washington | 1.20 | 1.93 | SR 703 (Shortsville Road) | Yellow Springs Road | SR 80 (Hayters Gap Road) | |
| Wise | 0.10 | 0.16 | SR 736 | Unnamed road Robinette Road | Dead End | |
| York | 0.19 | 0.31 | SR 629 (Dandy Loop Road) | Buckingham Drive | SR 629 (Dandy Loop Road) | |
