= Virginia State Route 684 =

State highway in Virginia, United States

State Route 684

Route information
- Maintained by VDOT

Location
- Country: United States
- State: Virginia

Highway system
- Virginia Routes; Interstate; US; Primary; Secondary; Byways; History; HOT lanes

State Route 684 (SR 684) in the U.S. state of Virginia is a secondary route designation applied to multiple discontinuous road segments among the many counties. The list below describes the sections in each county, that are designated SR 684.

== List ==
County	Length (mi)	Length (km)	From	Via	To	Notes
Accomack	3.85	6.20	Dead End	Guards Shore Road Mitchell Road	SR 687 (Bethel Church Road)	Gap between segments ending at different points along SR 658
Albemarle	4.50	7.24	SR 797 (Hillsboro Lane)	Half Mile Branch Road Lanetown Road Mint Springs Road	Dead End	Gap between segments ending at different points along SR 788
Alleghany	2.83	4.55	US 220 (Hot Springs Road)	Dunbrack Road	Dead End	
Amelia	0.70	1.13	SR 658 (Drunkard Road)	Morris Lane	Dead End	
Amherst	2.09	3.36	SR 685 (River Road)	Kings Road	SR 766 (Dillard Road)	
Appomattox	2.15	3.46	Dead End	Meginson Mill Road Moonlight Road	Dead End	
Augusta	2.68	4.31	SR 601 (Estaline Valley Road)	Little River Road Quarry Road City Street	SR 687 (Railroad Avenue)	
Bath	0.30	0.48	Dead End	Incubator Hollow Road	US 220 (Ingalls Boulevard)	
Bedford	12.16	19.57	SR 746 (Dickerson Mill Road)	Rocky Ford Road Penicks Mill Road	SR 680 (Sheep Creek Road)	
Bland	0.32	0.51	SR 617 (Waddletown Road)	Ridgeway Drive	Dead End	
Botetourt	4.50	7.24	SR 655 (Old Fincastle Road)	Sugar Tree Hollow Road	SR 682 (Austin Lane)	
Brunswick	1.30	2.09	SR 619 (Shining Creek Road)	Squirrel Hollow Road	Dead End	
Buchanan	0.15	0.24	Dead End	Webb Branch Road	US 460	
Buckingham	1.00	1.61	Dead End	Cobbs Road	SR 652 (Bridgeport Road)	
Campbell	2.27	3.65	SR 625 (Austin Mill Road)	Buffalo Mill Road	SR 682	
Caroline	0.88	1.42	SR 207 (Rogers Clark Boulevard)	Dry Bridge Road	SR 656 (Colemans Mill Road)	
Carroll	1.50	2.41	SR 683 (Turners Spur Road)	Dixie Trail	SR 674 (Red Hill Road)	
Charlotte	1.70	2.74	US 15 (Kings Highway)	Quarter Horse Road	SR 603 (Lindward Road)	
Chesterfield	1.15	1.85	SR 671 (Mount Hermon Road)	Mount Hermon Road	SR 652 (Old Hundred Road)	
Craig	0.18	0.29	SR 617	Unnamed road	Dead End	
Culpeper	2.90	4.67	SR 665 (Inlet Road)	Bel Pre Road	SR 663 (Stevensburg Road)	
Cumberland	1.03	1.66	SR 45 (Cartersville Road)/SR 616 (Deep Run Road)	Cartersville Road Extension	Powhatan County line	
Dickenson	0.05	0.08	Dead End	Unnamed road	SR 63 (Dante Mountain Road)	
Dinwiddie	0.56	0.90	Dead End	Airpark Drive	US 460 (Airport Street)	
Essex	12.30	19.79	SR 620 (Powcan Road)	Howerton Road Bowlers Road	Dead End	Formerly SR 199
Fairfax	3.01	4.84	Dead End	Spring Hill Road	SR 193 (Georgetown Pike)	
Fauquier	2.60	4.18	SR 744 (Lovers Lane)	Lees Ridge Road	US 15 (James Madison Highway)	
Floyd	2.51	4.04	Dead End	Dobbins Farm Road Red Oak Grove Road	SR 679 (Bethlehem Church Road)	
Fluvanna	0.70	1.13	Dead End	Franklin Lane	SR 608 (Rising Sun Road)	
Franklin	6.78	10.91	US 220 (Virgil H Goode Highway)	Boones Mill Road	SR 116 (Jubal Early Highway)	
Frederick	1.32	2.12	US 522 (Frederick Pike)	Gainesboro Road	US 522 (Frederick Pike)	
Giles	1.96	3.15	Dead End	Norcross Road	SR 635 (Big Stony Creek Road)	
Gloucester	1.80	2.90	Dead End	Starvation Road	SR 617 (Tanyard Landing Road)	
Goochland	0.80	1.29	Dead End	Ragland Road	SR 625 (Saint Pauls Church Road)	
Grayson	2.62	4.22	Dead End	Pinehurst Street Elliott Place Pinehurst Street	Dead End	
Greensville	0.40	0.64	Dead End	Poultry Drive Westover Drive	SR 644 (Satterfield Drive)	Gap between segments ending at different points along US 58
Halifax	3.60	5.79	SR 662 (Birch Elmo Road)	Mount Zion Church Road Hummingbird Lane	SR 683 (Oak Level Road)	
Hanover	11.08	17.83	SR 738 (Teman Road)	Verdon Road	Dead End	
Henry	5.32	8.56	Dead End	Friendly Church Road Carver Road	SR 609 (Patrick Avenue)/SR 747 (Chestnut Street)	
Isle of Wight	0.60	0.97	SR 625 (Pons Road)	Mullet Drive	Surry County line	
James City	0.33	0.53	SR 676 (Farmville Lane)	Thomas Nelson Lane	SR 676 (Farmville Lane)	
King and Queen	1.37	2.20	Dead End	The Forge Road	SR 639 (Eastern View Road)	
King George	0.35	0.56	SR 205 (Ridge Road)	Garnets Loop	SR 205 (Ridge Road)	
Lancaster	0.30	0.48	Dead End	Richtown Road	SR 604 (Merry Point Road)	
Lee	6.96	11.20	US 58 (Daniel Boone Trail)	Chadwell Station Road Unnamed road Holiness Hollow Road	Tennessee state line	
Loudoun	0.20	0.32	SR 671 (Harpers Ferry Road)	Snider Lane	Dead End	
Louisa	0.07	0.11	SR 618 (Fredericks Halls Road)	Tavern Road	Dead End	
Lunenburg	1.90	3.06	SR 685 (Germantown Road)	Baughan Road	SR 701 (Bruceville Road)	
Madison	1.69	2.72	SR 230 (Orange Road)	George James Loop Radiant Way	SR 230 (Orange Road)	
Mathews	0.55	0.89	SR 621 (Glebe Road)	Gayle Lane	Dead End	
Mecklenburg	3.80	6.12	SR 92/SR 609	Spanish Grove Road	SR 47	
Middlesex	0.86	1.38	SR 602 (Old Virginia Street)	Browns Lane	Dead End	
Montgomery	0.60	0.97	Dead End	Welcome Road	SR 655 (Long Shop Road/Mount Zion Road)	
Nelson	2.00	3.22	Dead End	Unnamed road	SR 814 (Campbells Mountain Road)	
Northampton	1.99	3.20	US 13 (Lankford Highway)	Fairview Road Bayview Circle	SR 641 (Culls Drive)	Formerly SR 186
Northumberland	0.52	0.84	Dead End	Deep Water Lane	SR 659 (Menhaden Road)	
Nottoway	0.55	0.89	Dead End	Crystal Lake Road	SR 607 (Jennings Town Road)	
Orange	0.50	0.80	Dead End	Maryland Road	SR 611 (Raccoon Road)	
Page	10.17	16.37	SR 675 (Egypt Bend Road/Bixlers Ferry Road)	Page Valley Road Unnamed road	US 340	Gap between dead ends
Patrick	1.20	1.93	SR 777 (American Legion Road)	Martin Farm Road Connect Road	SR 625 (Mountain View Loop)	
Pittsylvania	0.50	0.80	SR 938 (Meadows Road)	Jay Bird Lane	Dead End	
Powhatan	10.21	16.43	US 60	Bell Road Cartersville Road	Cumberland County line	
Prince George	0.53	0.85	Dead End	Fine Street	SR 645 (Puddledock Road)	
Prince William	2.07	3.33	SR 215	Buckland Mill Road	Dead End	
Pulaski	0.14	0.23	SR 715 (Brandon Road)	Washington Avenue	SR 715 (Brandon Road)	
Rappahannock	0.15	0.24	End of State Maintenance	Ash Tree Lane	US 211 (Lee Highway)	
Richmond	0.55	0.89	SR 619 (Mulberry Road)	Blues Lane	Dead End	
Roanoke	0.27	0.43	SR 613 (Merriman Road)	Token Road	Dead End	
Rockbridge	5.28	8.50	Dead End	Blue Ridge Road Sallings Mountain Road Tinkerville Road	US 11/FR-319	Gap between segments ending at different points along SR 608
Rockingham	0.70	1.13	SR 620 (Indian Trail Road)	Longbow Road Wildwood Drive	Dead End	
Russell	4.50	7.24	SR 65 (Mew Road)	Chestnut Ridge Circle Mill Hollow Road	SR 610 (Sunny Point Road)	Gap between dead ends
Scott	4.11	6.61	SR 610	Unnamed road Cowan Creek Road	SR 65 (Sinking Creek Highway)	
Shenandoah	1.10	1.77	SR 685 (Barbershop Road)	Stultz Gap Road	SR 686 (Ox Road)	
Smyth	0.44	0.71	US 11 (Lee Highway)	Old Tannery Road	Dead End	
Southampton	11.30	18.19	SR 673 (Statesville Road)	Monroe Road Sycamore Church Road Dogwood Bend Road Monroe Road	US 258 (Smith Ferry Road)	
Spotsylvania	1.60	2.57	SR 608 (Catharpin Road)	Craigs Church Lane	Dead End	
Stafford	2.39	3.85	SR 1486 (Austin Ridge Drive)	Mine Road Staffordborough Boulevard	Pike Place/Crater Lane	
Surry	0.35	0.56	Isle of Wight County line	Mullet Drive	Dead End	
Sussex	1.10	1.77	SR 609	Jefferson Road	SR 609 (Lebanon Church Road)	
Tazewell	0.80	1.29	Dead End	Smith Ridge Road	SR 616 (Smith Ridge Road)	
Warren	0.15	0.24	Dead End	Unnamed road	SR 613 (Indian Hollow Road)	
Washington	7.72	12.42	SR 766 (Rustic Lane)	Rattle Creek Road Fall Hill Road	SR 700 (Rich Valley Road)	
Westmoreland	0.31	0.50	SR 609 (Stratford Hill Road)	Doleman Lane	Dead End	
Wise	0.45	0.72	Dead End	Unnamed road	SR 620 (Guest River Road)	
Wythe	10.38	16.70	US 21	Unnamed road Chaney Branch Road Old Mountain Road Unnamed road Winding Road Pump Hollow Road	Dead End	Gap between a dead end and US 21 Gap between segments ending at different points along US 21
York	0.17	0.27	SR 682 (Lambs Creek Drive)	Creek Terrace	SR 682 (Lambs Creek Drive)	
