= Virginia State Route 699 =

State highway in Virginia, United States

State Route 699

Route information
- Maintained by VDOT

Location
- Country: United States
- State: Virginia

Highway system
- Virginia Routes; Interstate; US; Primary; Secondary; Byways; History; HOT lanes

State Route 699 (SR 699) in the U.S. state of Virginia is a secondary route designation applied to multiple discontinuous road segments among the many counties. The list below describes the sections in each county that are designated SR 699.

== List ==
County	Length (mi)	Length (km)	From	Via	To	Notes
Accomack	1.43	2.30	SR 700 (Messongo Road)	Stump Town Road Unnamed road	Dead End	Gap between segments ending at different points along SR 695
Albemarle	1.40	2.25	Dead End	Boaz Road Covesville Lane	SR 837 (Coves School Lane)	Gap between segments ending at different points along US 29
Alleghany	0.50	0.80	Dead End	Unnamed road	SR 606 (Sulphur Springs Road)	
Amelia	0.20	0.32	SR 662 (Pine Lane)	Pine Road Lane	Dead End	
Amherst	0.12	0.19	SR 671	Matthews Store Road	SR 671	
Appomattox	0.15	0.24	SR 665 (Meadow Drive)	Mountain Ridge Road	Dead End	
Augusta	5.80	9.33	SR 613 (Spring Hill Road)	Ridge Road Centerville Road	Rockingham County line	Gap between segments ending at different points along SR 646
Bath	0.12	0.19	SR 700 (Carloover Village Drive)	Carloover Lane	US 220 (Ingalls Boulevard)	
Bedford	4.45	7.16	Botetourt County line	Bore Auger Road	SR 619 (Jordantown Road)	
Botetourt	0.70	1.13	Dead End	Soldiers Retreat Road	SR 633 (McKinney Hollow Road)	
Brunswick	0.40	0.64	US 58 (Governor Harrison Parkway)	Northview Drive	SR 694 (Twin Ponds Road)	
Buchanan	0.50	0.80	SR 645	Unnamed road	SR 691	
Buckingham	1.14	1.83	SR 20 (Constitution Route)	Darbytown Road Winfrey Inez Road	SR 631 (Troublesome Creek Road)	
Campbell	9.15	14.73	US 29 (Wards Road)	Gladys Road	SR 761 (Long Island Road)	
Caroline	0.90	1.45	Dead End	Carters Gate Road	SR 603 (Landora Bridge Road)	
Carroll	2.01	3.23	SR 775 (Chances Creek Road)	Chantilly Drive	SR 698 (Spring Bud Drive)	
Charlotte	0.80	1.29	Dead End	Deer Road	SR 47 (Thomas Jefferson Highway)	
Chesterfield	0.17	0.27	SR 2406 (Bermuda Avenue)	Hanover Street	SR 904 (Point De Rock Road)	
Craig	0.20	0.32	Dead End	Unnamed road	SR 609 (Sand Plant Road)	
Culpeper	0.30	0.48	Culpeper town limits	East Chandler Street	Dead End	
Cumberland	0.80	1.29	Dead End	Thompson Drive	SR 45 (Cumberland Road)	
Dickenson	4.10	6.60	SR 657 (Hazel Mountain Road)	Counts Ridge Road	Dead End	
Dinwiddie	3.30	5.31	SR 611 (Wilkinson Road)	Horsetail Road	SR 708 (Namozine Road)	
Essex	0.37	0.60	SR 625 (Supply Road)	The Hook Road	Dead End	
Fairfax	2.70	4.35	SR 236 (Little River Turnpike)	Prosperity Avenue	SR 744 (Hilltop Road)	
Fauquier	2.21	3.56	US 17 (James Madison Highway)	Merry Oaks Lane	US 17 (James Madison Highway)	
Floyd	1.15	1.85	Dead End	Bluebird Road	SR 615 (Christiansburg Pike)	
Fluvanna	0.35	0.56	Dead End	Meeks Lane	SR 626 (Jordan Store Road)	
Franklin	2.50	4.02	Dead End	Flint Hill Road Angle Plantation Road	SR 697 (Brick Church Road)	
Frederick	3.20	5.15	US 522 (Frederick Pike)	New Hope Road	SR 694 (Cumberland Trail Road)	
Giles	0.60	0.97	SR 622 (Guinea Mountain Road)	Kerr Lane	Dead End	
Gloucester	0.73	1.17	Dead End	Lillaston Lane	SR 216 (Guinea Road)	
Goochland	2.85	4.59	SR 606 (Three Chopt Road)	Three Chopt Road	SR 669 (County Line Road)	
Grayson	0.80	1.29	Dead End	River Valley Lane	SR 700 (Old River Lane)	
Greensville	0.50	0.80	Dead End	William Road	US 301 (Skippers Road)	
Halifax	6.30	10.14	North Carolina state line	Mount Caramel Road Wilkins Road	US 58 (Philpott Road)	
Hanover	0.80	1.29	SR 651 (Georgetown Road)	Foxal Road	Dead End	
Henry	0.17	0.27	US 58 (A L Philpott Highway)	Mayo Landing Road	Dead End	
Isle of Wight	0.83	1.34	Dead End	Woody Acres Way	SR 679 (Bethel Church Lane)	
James City	0.50	0.80	Dead End	Camp Road	US 60 (Richmond Road)	
King George	0.35	0.56	US 301 (James Madison Parkway)	Ivy Hill Loop	US 301 (James Madison Parkway)	
Lancaster	0.25	0.40	SR 675 (Black Stump Road)	Waddy Drive	Dead End	
Lee	2.10	3.38	Dead End	Machine Branch Road	US 58 (Daniel Boone Trail)	
Loudoun	2.75	4.43	Leesburg town limits	Dry Mill Road	SR 7 Bus (Colonial Highway)	
Louisa	5.20	8.37	SR 640 (Old Mountain Road)	Indian Creek Road	US 522 (Cross County Road)	
Madison	0.60	0.97	Dead End	Lester Utz Lane	SR 629 (Spring Branch Road)	
Mathews	0.37	0.60	SR 691 (Heath Road)	Doctors Creek Road	Dead End	
Mecklenburg	4.90	7.89	Dead End	Staunton River Road Bluestock Creek Road	SR 610 (Bluestone Drive)	Gap between segments ending at different points along SR 640
Middlesex	0.31	0.50	SR 646/SR 663	Hideaway Point	Dead End	
Montgomery	0.30	0.48	Dead End	Loganberry Lane	SR 644 (Pollard Road)	
Nelson	1.46	2.35	SR 56 (Crabtree Falls Highway)	Carter Hill Road	SR 680 (Cub Creek Road/Pharsalia Road)	
Northampton	0.11	0.18	Dead End	Baxley Lane	SR 617 (Red Bank Road)	
Northumberland	1.02	1.64	SR 200 (Jesse DuPont Memorial Highway)	Old Glebe Point Road	SR 200 (Jesse DuPont Memorial Highway)	
Nottoway	0.08	0.13	US 460 Bus (Old Nottoway Road)	Simmons Lane	SR 726 (Walnut Hill Road)	
Orange	0.30	0.48	Dead End	Governor Kemper Road	SR 674 (Little Skyline Drive)	
Page	0.30	0.48	US 340	Johnnys Road	Dead End	
Patrick	2.05	3.30	North Carolina state line	Hughes Brown Road Dominion Valley Lane	Dead End	Gap between segments ending at different points along SR 631
Pittsylvania	0.70	1.13	Dead End	Brownville Heights Road	SR 57 (Halifax Road)	
Prince Edward	1.80	2.90	SR 667 (Bloomfield Road)	Carter Road	SR 666 (Douglas Church Road)	
Prince George	0.23	0.37	Dead End	River Run Road	Cul-de-Sac	
Prince William	0.26	0.42	Manassas city limits	Thomas Drive	SR 719 (Rolling Road)	
Pulaski	0.62	1.00	Pulaski town limits	McFall Hollow Road	Dead End	
Richmond	0.13	0.21	Dead End	Scott Town Road	SR 670 (Scott Town Road)	
Roanoke	0.46	0.74	SR 622 (Bradshaw Road)	Beudemeer Road	SR 864 (Old Catawba Road)	
Rockbridge	5.10	8.21	US 60/FR-742	Wesley Chapel Road Unnamed road	Dead End	Gap between segments ending at different points along SR 608
Rockingham	1.79	2.88	Augusta County line	Centerville Road	SR 42 (Warm Springs Pike)	
Russell	1.52	2.45	US 58 Alt	Fork Ridge Road	SR 673 (Morning Star Circle)	
Scott	0.50	0.80	Tennessee state line	Whitaker Road	SR 704	
Shenandoah	1.38	2.22	US 11 (Old Valley Pike)	Whitehall Lane	Dead End	Gap between a dead end and SR 698
Smyth	0.95	1.53	SR 16	Brushy Mountain Road	Dead End	
Southampton	0.60	0.97	Dead End	Old Joyner Lane	SR 609 (Pope Station Road)	
Spotsylvania	0.96	1.54	Caroline County line	French Acors Road	SR 605 (Marye Road)	
Stafford	0.13	0.21	Cul-de-Sac	Juliad Court	SR 700 (International Parkway)	
Sussex	2.20	3.54	SR 698 (Sandy Field Road)	Rocky Branch Road	SR 630 (Little Mill Road)	
Tazewell	2.05	3.30	SR 637 (Limestone Road)	Green Mountain Road	SR 631 (Baptist Valley Road)	
Washington	3.84	6.18	Abingdon town limits	Walden Road	SR 740 (Old Saltworks Road)	
Westmoreland	0.44	0.71	Dead End	Pratts Place	SR 643 (Chilton Road)	
Wise	6.03	9.70	SR 706	Unnamed road	SR 1121 (Halifax Road)	
Wythe	4.10	6.60	SR 674	Unnamed road	SR 667 (Old Stage Road)	
York	0.25	0.40	SR 700 (Sylvia Drive)	Shirley Drive	SR 606 (Running Man Trail)	
