= Virginia State Route 745 =

Secondary route designation

State Route 745

Route information
- Maintained by VDOT

Location
- Country: United States
- State: Virginia

Highway system
- Virginia Routes; Interstate; US; Primary; Secondary; Byways; History; HOT lanes

State Route 745 (SR 745) in the U.S. state of Virginia is a secondary route designation applied to multiple discontinuous road segments among the many counties. The list below describes the sections in each county that are designated SR 745.

== List ==
County	Length (mi)	Length (km)	From	Via	To	Notes
Accomack	0.60	0.97	Dead End	Barn Woods Road	SR 638 (Evans Wharf Road)	
Albemarle	2.38	3.83	US 29 (Monican Trail Road)	Arrowhead Valley Road Poorhouse Road	Dead End	
Amherst	1.00	1.61	Forest Service Road	Alhambra Road	SR 827 (Perkins Mill Road)	
Augusta	1.60	2.57	SR 732 (Roman Road)	Todd Road Mount Pisgah Road	SR 742 (Lebanon Church Road)	
Bedford	3.10	4.99	SR 747 (Joppa Mill Road)	Mount Olivet Road Fiddler Creek Road	Dead End	Gap between segments ending at different points along SR 746
Botetourt	0.40	0.64	SR 742 (Branch Road)	Mountain Road	Dead End	
Campbell	0.50	0.80	SR 24 (Village Highway)	Mountain Road	Dead End	
Carroll	4.65	7.48	SR 743 (Oak Grove Road)	Stone Ridge Road	SR 743 (Pleasant View Road)	Gap between segments ending at different points along SR 740
Chesterfield	1.20	1.93	SR 653 (Qualla Road)	Belcherwood Road	Dead End	
Dinwiddie	0.20	0.32	Dead End	Fisher Road	SR 651 (Mason Church Road)	
Fairfax	0.25	0.40	SR 657 (Walney Road)	Dallas Street	Dead End	
Fauquier	1.60	2.57	SR 28 (Catlett Road)	Liberty Road	SR 837 (Old Marsh Road)	
Franklin	0.96	1.54	SR 643 (Adney Gap Road/Dillons Mill Road)	Dillons Mill Road	Dead End	
Frederick	0.40	0.64	Dead End	Nelsons Chapel Lane	SR 693 (Collinsville Road)	
Halifax	1.20	1.93	SR 658 (Cherry Hill Church Road)	Loftis Road	SR 744 (East Hyco Road)	
Hanover	0.35	0.56	SR 602 (Mount Hope Church Road)	Richards Road	Dead End	
Henry	0.08	0.13	SR 747/SR 872	Brook Street	SR 701 (Field Avenue)	
Loudoun	1.70	2.74	SR 744 (Snake Hill Road)	Pot House Road Mountville Road	SR 733 (Leith Lane)	
Louisa	2.15	3.46	SR 649/SR 633	Tisdale Road	SR 632 (Waldrop Church Road)	
Mecklenburg	2.30	3.70	SR 634 (Traffic Road)	Twin Peaks Road	SR 662 (Wightman Road)	
Montgomery	0.54	0.87	US 11/US 460	Big Spring Drive	US 11/US 460	
Pittsylvania	4.98	8.01	US 29 Bus/SR 721	Mount View Road	SR 863 (R and L Smith Drive)	
Prince William	0.13	0.21	SR 746 (Smithfield Road)	Coopers Lane	SR 792 (Bradley Forest Road)	
Pulaski	0.60	0.97	SR 710 (Mount Olivet Road)	Haynes Road	Dead End	
Roanoke	1.30	2.09	US 221 (Bent Mountain Road)	Ran Lynn Drive	Dead End	
Rockbridge	0.46	0.74	SR 608 (Forge Road)	Paxton House Drive	Buena Vista city limits	
Rockingham	1.40	2.25	SR 257 (Ottobine Road)	Martin Miller Road	SR 752 (Beaver Creek Road)	
Scott	0.10	0.16	US 23	Greenwood Drive	SR 1116 (Greenwood Drive)	
Shenandoah	0.30	0.48	SR 622 (Minebank Road)	Spiker Lane	Dead End	
Spotsylvania	0.31	0.50	Dead End	Woodside Drive	SR 694 (Heatherstone Drive)	
Stafford	0.10	0.16	SR 637 (Telegraph Road)	Old Mount Road	Dead End	
Tazewell	0.36	0.58	Dead End	Schoolhouse Road	US 19/US 460	
Washington	7.60	12.23	SR 80 (Lindall Road)	Old Saltworks Road	SR 91 (Main Street)	
Wise	0.36	0.58	SR 68	Oakdale Street	SR 68	
York	0.47	0.76	SR 716	Horseshoe Drive	SR 716/SR 1328	
