= Virginia State Route 683 =

State highway in Virginia, United States

State Route 683

Route information
- Maintained by VDOT

Location
- Country: United States
- State: Virginia

Highway system
- Virginia Routes; Interstate; US; Primary; Secondary; Byways; History; HOT lanes

State Route 683 (SR 683) in the U.S. state of Virginia is a secondary route designation applied to multiple discontinuous road segments among the many counties. The list below describes the sections in each county that are designated SR 683.

== List ==
County	Length (mi)	Length (km)	From	Via	To	Notes
Accomack	2.25	3.62	Dead End	Muddy Creek Road Payne Road	SR 687 (Bethel Church Road)	Gap between segments ending at different points along SR 658
Albemarle	1.20	1.93	Dead End	Shelton Mills Road	SR 751 (Brownsville Road)	
Alleghany	0.95	1.53	SR 661 (Midland Trail)	Callaghan Circle	SR 661 (Midland Trail)	
Amelia	0.65	1.05	SR 705 (Mount Olive Lane)	Chula School Lane	Dead End	
Amherst	2.16	3.48	SR 685 (River Road)	Thomas Road	SR 766 (Dillard Road)	
Appomattox	2.80	4.51	SR 611 (Lime Plant Road/Abbit Branch Road)	Lime Plant Road	SR 605 (James River Road/Beckham Road)	
Augusta	2.16	3.48	SR 687 (Railroad Avenue)	Basham Road Wallace Mill Road	Dead End	
Bath	1.80	2.90	SR 629 (Douthat Park Road)	Blue Grass Hollow Road	SR 39 (Mountain Valley Road)	
Bedford	2.88	4.63	SR 682 (Kelso Mill Road)	Sharps Mountain Road	SR 682 (Kelso Mill Road)	
Botetourt	1.03	1.66	Dead End	Patterson Trail	US 220 (Botetourt Road)	
Brunswick	1.80	2.90	SR 674 (Greentown Drive)	Wilson Drive	SR 670 (Western Mill Road)	
Buchanan	1.25	2.01	SR 624	Horn Branch Road	Dead End	
Buckingham	5.00	8.05	SR 608 (Paradise Road)	Saw Mill Road Mohele Road	Dead End	Gap between segments ending at different points along US 15
Campbell	8.96	14.42	Dead End	Church Lane Miles Lane Lawyers Road	US 29 (Wards Road)	Gap between segments ending at different points along SR 24 Gap between segments ending at different points along SR 682
Caroline	4.21	6.78	SR 658 (Jericho Road)	CCC Road	US 1 (Jefferson Davis Highway)	
Carroll	20.98	33.76	Galax city limits	Poplar Knob Road Sleepy Hollow Road Milestone Road Milford Road Beamers Knob Road Unnamed road Turners Spur Road Greenbury Road	SR 670 (Snake Creek Road)	Gap between segments ending at different points along SR 701 Gap between segments ending at different points along SR 775 Gap between segments ending at different points along US 52 Gap between segments ending at different points along SR 682
Charlotte	0.25	0.40	SR 686 (Roseland Road)	Otter Creek Road	Mecklenburg County line	
Chesterfield	1.05	1.69	SR 147 (Huguenot Road)	Forest Hill Avenue	Richmond city limits	
Craig	0.03	0.05	Dead End	Unnamed road	SR 650 (Marshall Avenue)	
Culpeper	1.50	2.41	SR 619 (Richards Ferry Road)	River Mill Road	Dead End	
Cumberland	0.40	0.64	Dead End	Jefferson Road	SR 45 (Cartersville Road)	
Dickenson	1.00	1.61	Dead End	Unnamed road	SR 611	
Dinwiddie	1.25	2.01	SR 651 (Whitmore Road)	Continental Road	Dead End	
Essex	0.55	0.89	Dead End	Fountain Run Road	SR 620 (Dunbrooke Road)	
Fairfax	4.10	6.60	SR 193 (Georgetown Pike)	Leigh Mill Road Bellview Road	SR 193 (Georgetown Pike)	Gap between segments ending at different points along SR 676
Fauquier	1.40	2.25	Dead End	Turnbull Road	Dead End	Gap between segments ending at different points along SR 802
Floyd	2.10	3.38	US 221 (Floyd Highway)	Roger Road	Dead End	
Fluvanna	0.75	1.21	Dead End	Rockfish Run Road	SR 6 (West River Road)	
Franklin	0.10	0.16	SR 634 (Harmony School Road)	Old Brook Road	Dead End	
Frederick	0.70	1.13	Dead End	Rock Enon Springs Road	SR 704 (Back Creek Road)	
Giles	0.32	0.51	SR 720 (Gravely Hill Road)	Rogers Road	Dead End	
Gloucester	0.70	1.13	SR 624 (Griffen Road)	Back Creek Road	Dead End	
Goochland	0.29	0.47	SR 653 (Three Chopt Road)	Parrish Road	Louisa County line	
Grayson	1.00	1.61	US 58 (Wilson Highway)	Twin Oaks Road	SR 682 (Saddle Creek Road)	
Greensville	0.36	0.58	US 58 (Pleasant Shade Drive)	Sadler Drive Unnamed road	SR 644 (Satterfield Drive)	
Halifax	7.10	11.43	SR 659 (River Road)	Oak Level Road	SR 360 (Mountain Road)	
Hanover	2.40	3.86	SR 54 (Patrick Henry Road)	Terry Road	SR 658 (Goshen Road)	
Henry	8.29	13.34	SR 687 (Preston Road)	The Great Road	Dead End	
Isle of Wight	3.40	5.47	SR 682 (White House Road)	Halltown Road Dews Plantation Road Green Level Road	SR 680 (Stallings Creek Road)	Gap between segments ending at different points along SR 681
King and Queen	0.07	0.11	Dead End	Gregory Lane	SR 33 (Lewis Puller Memorial Highway)	
King George	0.20	0.32	SR 614 (Potomac Drive)	Ferry Dock Road	SR 693 (Townsend Drive)	
Lancaster	1.64	2.64	Dead End	Belle Isle Road	SR 354 (River Road)	
Lee	3.70	5.95	SR 851	Unnamed road	SR 744 (Willow Tree Road)	
Loudoun	1.07	1.72	SR 671 (Harpers Ferry Road)	Branchriver Road	Dead End	
Louisa	2.20	3.54	Goochland County line	Parrish Road	SR 640 (Old Mountain Road)	
Lunenburg	5.70	9.17	SR 626 (Double Bridge Road)	Springfield Road	Prince Edward County line	
Madison	0.62	1.00	Dead End	John Weaver Drive	US 29 (Seminole Trail)	
Mathews	0.37	0.60	Dead End	Storehouse Road	SR 14 (John Clayton Memorial Highway)	
Mecklenburg	5.89	9.48	Charlotte County line	High House Road Lenhart Drive Lenhard Road	SR 682 (Finneywood Road)	Gap between segments ending at different points along SR 47
Middlesex	0.33	0.53	Dead End	Buckview Lane	SR 660 (Jackson Creek Road)	
Montgomery	1.30	2.09	Dead End	Paris Mountain Road	SR 622 (Reesdale Road)	
Nelson	1.30	2.09	Dead End	Coxs Creek Lane	SR 56 (Crabtree Falls Highway)	
Northampton	0.85	1.37	US 13 (Lankford Highway)	Siding Road Capeville Drive	SR 600 (Seaside Road)	Formerly SR 186
Northumberland	0.90	1.45	SR 646 (Fairport Road)	Old Fairport Road	SR 646 (Fairport Road)	
Nottoway	0.10	0.16	US 460 Bus (Old Nottoway Road)	Mann Road	Dead End	
Orange	0.23	0.37	SR 624 (Tower Road)	McKim Lane	Cul-de-Sac	
Page	2.16	3.48	SR 602 (Maryland Avenue)	First Street Railroad Street Shenandoah River Road	US 340	
Patrick	1.48	2.38	SR 682 (Big A School Road)	High Point Church Road	SR 680 (South Mayo Drive)	
Pittsylvania	10.30	16.58	SR 649 (Sheva Road)	South Meadows Road Meadows Road Johnson Mill Road	SR 40 (Gretna Road)	Gap between segments ending at different points along SR 686
Prince Edward	0.70	1.13	US 15 (Farmville Road)	Stokes Road	US 15 (Farmville Road)	
Prince William	1.20	1.93	Dead End	Cerro Gordo Road	US 29 (Lee Highway)	
Pulaski	1.58	2.54	SR 643 (Cougar Trail Road)	Alexander Road Charles Drive	Dead End	
Rappahannock	0.39	0.63	US 211 Bus/US 522 Bus	Old Mill Road	US 211/US 522 (Lee Highway)	
Richmond	0.38	0.61	Dead End	Bowens Lane	SR 652 (Waterview Road)	
Roanoke	0.12	0.19	Dead End	Sparks Road	SR 613 (Merriman Road)	
Rockbridge	1.50	2.41	SR 734 (Broad Creek Church Road)	Sulphur Springs Road	SR 610 (Plank Road)	
Rockingham	0.60	0.97	SR 655 (Penn Laird Drive)	Watertower Road	Dead End	
Russell	5.24	8.43	US 58 Alt	Memorial Drive	US 58 Alt	
Scott	2.48	3.99	SR 65 (Sinking Creek Highway)	Unnamed road	SR 65 (Sinking Creek Highway)	
Shenandoah	0.80	1.29	SR 605	Honeysuckle Avenue	SR 42 (Senedo Road)	
Smyth	2.33	3.75	SR 615 (Rocky Hollow Road)	Winsor Avenue	SR 617 (Davis Valley Road/Stowall Road)	Gap between segments ending at different points along US 11
Southampton	4.40	7.08	SR 674 (Cypress Bridge Road)	Mary Hunt Road	SR 684 (Monroe Road)	
Spotsylvania	0.47	0.76	Dead End	Bartlett Lane	Dead End	
Stafford	0.13	0.21	SR 690 (Sandy Ridge Road)	Sandy Ridge Court	Cul-de-Sac	
Sussex	0.10	0.16	Dead End	Wyte Lane	SR 645 (Green Church Road)	
Tazewell	0.97	1.56	US 460	Jacks Creek Road	SR 617 (Red Root Ridge Road)	
Warren	1.48	2.38	SR 661 (Fairground Road)	Bowling Green Road	SR 658 (Rockland Road)	
Washington	0.55	0.89	Dead End	Adare Lane	SR 681 (Woodland Hills Road)	
Westmoreland	0.40	0.64	King George County line	Trigger Lane	Dead End	
Wise	0.68	1.09	SR 613 (East Stone Gap Road)	Preston Road	SR 610 (Powell Valley Road)	
Wythe	1.20	1.93	SR 682	Green Mountain Road	SR 617 (Dutton Hollow Road)	
York	0.07	0.11	SR 682 (Lambs Creek Drive)	Carpenter Drive	Cul-de-Sac	
