= Virginia State Route 685 =

State highway in Virginia, United States

State Route 685

Route information
- Maintained by VDOT

Location
- Country: United States
- State: Virginia

Highway system
- Virginia Routes; Interstate; US; Primary; Secondary; Byways; History; HOT lanes

State Route 685 (SR 685) in the U.S. state of Virginia is a secondary route designation applied to multiple discontinuous road segments among the many counties. The list below describes the sections in each county that are designated SR 685.

== List ==
County	Length (mi)	Length (km)	From	Via	To	Notes
Accomack	1.50	2.41	Dead End	Gladding Landing Road	SR 658 (Winterville Road)	
Albemarle	0.70	1.13	SR 616 (Black Cat Road)	Bunker Hill Road	Dead End	
Alleghany	0.59	0.95	Dead End	Jacksons Flat Road	SR 657 (Pitzer Ridge Road)	
Amelia	0.75	1.21	Dead End	Esnora Lane	SR 708 (Namozine Road)	
Amherst	6.35	10.22	SR 130 (Elon Road)	River Road	SR 163 (Amherst Highway)	
Appomattox	0.90	1.45	SR 647 (Spout Spring Road)	Tanglewood Road	SR 703 (Snapps Mill Road)	
Augusta	1.04	1.67	SR 684 (Little River Road)	Lehigh Road	SR 42 (Craig Street)	
Bath	0.33	0.53	Dead End	Methodist Lane	SR 613 (Forestry Road)	
Bedford	1.10	1.77	SR 688 (Buffalo Run Road)	Breezy Ridge Road	SR 684 (Penicks Mill Road)	
Botetourt	1.94	3.12	SR 615 (Craig Creek Road)	Ball Park Road	Dead End	
Brunswick	2.20	3.54	SR 715 (Iron Bridge Road)	Fleshood Lane	Dead End	
Buchanan	2.50	4.02	SR 638 (Dismal River Road)	Lower Big Branch Road	Dead End	
Buckingham	0.65	1.05	SR 675 (Arvon Road)	Rock Culvert Road	SR 673 (Virginia Mill Road)	
Campbell	3.50	5.63	SR 738 (Greenhouse Road)	Calohan Road Wisecarver Road	SR 686 (Browns Mill Road)	
Caroline	0.45	0.72	SR 639 (Ladysmith Road)	Vip Jon Road	SR 639 (Ladysmith Road)	
Carroll	7.32	11.78	SR 608 (Lightning Ridge Road)	Turkey Ridge Road Skyview Drive Winding Ridge Road Baltimore Road	SR 702 (Stable Road)	Gap between segments ending at different points along US 52
Charles City	1.66	2.67	SR 106 (Roxbury Road)	Chambers Road	SR 609 (Barnetts Road)	
Charlotte	1.15	1.85	SR 608 (Public Fork Road)	Berles Creek Road	SR 607 (Roanoke Station Road)	Gap between segments ending at different points along US 360
Chesterfield	0.92	1.48	SR 652 (Old Hundred Road)	Dry Bridge Road	US 60 (Midlothian Turnpike)	
Craig	1.71	2.75	SR 611 (Peaceful Valley Road)	Fenwick Mines Road Unnamed road	Dead End	
Culpeper	8.98	14.45	SR 729 (Eggbornsville Road)	Chestnut Fork Road Auburn Road Fleetwood Heights Road	SR 676 (Berry Hill Road)/SR 786 (Airpark Drive)	
Cumberland	1.00	1.61	SR 654 (Pinegrove Road)	Miller Lane	Dead End	
Dickenson	0.02	0.03	SR 693 (Bartley Street)	Bridge Street	SR 63	
Dinwiddie	0.16	0.26	Dead End	Oakley Drive	US 1 (Boydton Plank Road)	
Essex	0.95	1.53	SR 606 (Fairfield Lane)	River Landing Road	Dead End	
Fairfax	1.51	2.43	SR 694 (Lewinsville Road)	Swinks Mill Road	SR 193 (Georgetown Pike)	
Fauquier	1.89	3.04	SR 651 (Lees Mill Road)	Routts Hill Road Paradise Road	Dead End	Gap between segments ending at different points along SR 687
Floyd	0.80	1.29	SR 686 (Moore Road)	Red Oak Grove Road	SR 684 (Dobbins Farm Road)	
Fluvanna	0.34	0.55	Dead End	Colemans Lane	SR 659 (Stage Junction Road)	
Franklin	0.27	0.43	Dead End	Spanish Oak Road	SR 781 (King Richard Road)	
Frederick	1.30	2.09	SR 600 (Siler Road)	Light Road	SR 681 (Hunting Ridge Road)	
Giles	0.90	1.45	SR 601 (Laurel Springs Road)	Jones Lane	SR 602 (Rocky Sink Road)	
Gloucester	0.70	1.13	Dead End	Five Gables Drive	SR 626 (Baileys Wharf Road)	
Goochland	0.50	0.80	SR 623 (Ashland Road)	Johnson Road	Dead End	
Grayson	3.79	6.10	US 58 (Main Street)	Power House Road Unnamed road Powerhouse Road Rock Creek Road	SR 274 (Riverside Drive)	
Greene	0.11	0.18	Dead End	Marshall Road	SR 671 (Sam Durrer Road)	
Halifax	4.70	7.56	SR 662 (Birch Elmo Road)	Lewis Ferrell Road	SR 683/SR 771	
Hanover	7.40	11.91	SR 671 (Coatesville Road)	Scotchtown Road Rocketts Mill Road New Market Mill Road	SR 684 (Verdon Road)	Gap between segments ending at different points along SR 738
Henry	1.48	2.38	SR 641 (Fishers Farm Road)	Joseph Martin Highway	US 220 Bus	
James City	0.17	0.27	Cul-de-Sac	Tyler Brooks Drive	SR 684 (Thomas Nelson Lane)	
King and Queen	0.80	1.29	SR 14 (The Trail)	Fish Hatchery Road	Dead End	
King George	0.13	0.21	SR 624 (Mathias Point Road)	Schoolhouse Road	Dead End	
Lancaster	0.39	0.63	SR 615 (Beanes Road)	Twin Branch Road	Dead End	
Lee	1.90	3.06	Dead End	Indian Creek Road Lick Branch Road	SR 684 (Holiness Hollow Road)	Gap between segments ending at different points along SR 687
Loudoun	1.00	1.61	SR 686 (Sawmill Lane)	Arnold Lane	Dead End	
Louisa	1.50	2.41	SR 652 (Kentucky Springs Road)	Centerville Road	Dead End	
Lunenburg	5.64	9.08	SR 683 (Springfield Road)	Germantown Road	US 360 (Kings Highway)	
Madison	0.79	1.27	SR 230 (Orange Road)	Burnt Tree Way Slaughter Drive	Dead End	
Mathews	0.07	0.11	Dead End	East River Road	SR 660 (Grace Street)	
Mecklenburg	0.61	0.98	Dead End	Reveille Road	SR 49	
Middlesex	0.15	0.24	Dead End	Riverview Avenue	SR 651 (Point Breeze Road/Smokey Point Road)	
Montgomery	5.02	8.08	SR 114 (Peppers Ferry Road)/SR 663 (Walton Road)	Prices Fork Road	Blacksburg town limits	
Nelson	3.50	5.63	SR 56	Bradley Lane Mill Creek School Road	Dead End	
Northampton	0.37	0.60	SR 613 (Occohannack Neck Road)	Deagonal Street	Dead End	
Northumberland	0.40	0.64	SR 627 (Lake Landing Road)	Oyster Road	Dead End	
Nottoway	0.45	0.72	Dead End	Piper Lane	SR 601 (Flat Rock Road)	
Orange	0.35	0.56	SR 603 (Indian Town Road)	Russel Road	Dead End	
Page	3.51	5.65	US 340	Newport Road	US 340	
Patrick	0.40	0.64	SR 654 (Concord Church Road/Russel Creek Lane)	Cedar Creek Lane	Dead End	
Pittsylvania	19.25	30.98	SR 1407 (Military Drive)	Hurt Street Chalk Level Road Telegraph Road	SR 640 (Wards Road/Renan Road)	Gap between segments ending at different points along SR 670
Prince Edward	0.98	1.58	SR 751 (Hidden Lake Road)	Pineview Road	SR 655 (Railroad Avenue)	
Prince George	0.62	1.00	Dead End	Flexon Drive	SR 684 (Fine Street)	
Prince William	2.35	3.78	US 15 (James Madison Highway)	Lightner Road	Dead End	
Pulaski	0.18	0.29	SR 622 (Dudley Ferry Road)	Carden Drive	SR 715 (Brandon Road)	Gap along a segment not maintained by VDOT
Richmond	0.35	0.56	Dead End	Parish Road	SR 637 (County Bridge Road)	
Roanoke	1.92	3.09	SR 419 (Electric Road)	Keagy Road	SR 419 (Electric Road)	
Rockingham	0.60	0.97	SR 620 (Mountain Valley Road)	Caverns Drive	Dead End	
Russell	1.50	2.41	Scott County line	Buckey Creek Road Vanderpool Road	SR 611 (Johnson Settlement Road)	Gap between segments ending at different points along SR 611
Scott	3.70	5.95	SR 774 (Long Hollow Road)	Buckeye Creek Road	Russell County line	
Shenandoah	2.25	3.62	SR 675 (Stoney Creek Road)	Barbershop Road	SR 682 (Readus Road)	
Smyth	0.72	1.16	Dead End	Flowing Springs Road	SR 617 (Crowe Hollow Road)	
Southampton	1.60	2.57	North Carolina state line	Whitley Branch Road	SR 686 (Raiver Dale Drive)	
Spotsylvania	0.45	0.72	Dead End	Pritchett Road	SR 648 (Block House Road)	
Stafford	1.55	2.49	Cul-de-Sac	Cantebury Drive Thorny Road	Dead End	
Sussex	0.60	0.97	Dead End	Unnamed road	SR 638 (Zion Road)	
Tazewell	0.50	0.80	Dead End	Wild Duck Road	SR 643 (Mud Fork Road)	
Warren	0.24	0.39	SR 638 (Howellsville Road)	Unnamed road	Dead End	
Washington	0.06	0.10	Bristol city limits	Terrace Drive	Dead End	
Westmoreland	0.37	0.60	SR 3 (Kings Highway)	Ashbury Road	Dead End	
Wise	2.69	4.33	Dead End	Unnamed road Roda Road	SR 78	
Wythe	0.80	1.29	Dead End	Shadow Lane	SR 634 (Lots Gap Road)	
York	0.05	0.08	SR 722 (Richwine Drive)	Blalock Drive	Dead End	
