= Virginia State Route 791 =

Secondary route designation

State Route 791

Route information
- Maintained by VDOT

Location
- Country: United States
- State: Virginia

Highway system
- Virginia Routes; Interstate; US; Primary; Secondary; Byways; History; HOT lanes

State Route 791 (SR 791) in the U.S. state of Virginia is a secondary route designation applied to multiple discontinuous road segments among the many counties. The list below describes the sections in each county that are designated SR 791.

== List ==
County	Length (mi)	Length (km)	From	Via	To	Notes
Accomack	0.30	0.48	Dead End	Bending Stream Drive	SR 178 (Shields Bridge Road)	
Albemarle	0.55	0.89	SR 688 (Midway Road)	Wyant Lane	Dead End	
Amherst	0.17	0.27	Dead End	Lee Drive	Dead End	
Augusta	0.12	0.19	US 340 (East Side Highway)	Mike Mountain Lane	Dead End	
Bedford	1.23	1.98	Dead End	Oddfellows Road Wildcat Road Blankenship Road	Dead End	Gap between segments ending at different points along SR 24
Botetourt	0.24	0.39	Dead End	North Oakwood Road	SR 652 (Mountain Pass Road)	
Campbell	0.55	0.89	US 460 Bus	Honeywood Drive	Dead End	
Carroll	0.90	1.45	Dead End	Blackberry Lane	SR 722 (Cranberry Road)	
Chesterfield	0.26	0.42	US 360 (Hull Street Road)	Ladino Lane	US 360 (Hull Street Road)	
Fairfax	0.15	0.24	SR 7644 (Plaskett Lane)	Fleenor Lane	Dead End	
Fauquier	1.00	1.61	Dead End	Foxville Road	SR 687 (Opal Road)	
Franklin	0.42	0.68	Dead End	Ashbrook Road	SR 813 (Taylor Tyree Road)	
Frederick	0.20	0.32	Cul-de-Sac	Dixie Belle Drive	SR 657 (Senseny Road)	
Halifax	1.59	2.56	SR 57 (Chatham Road)	Leighwood Trail	Dead End	
Hanover	0.35	0.56	US 33 (Mountain Road)	Brown Pleasants Road	Dead End	
Henry	0.40	0.64	Dead End	Mars Drive	SR 610 (Axton Road)	
Loudoun	0.60	0.97	Dead End	Lakefield Road	SR 7 Bus (Loudoun Street)	
Louisa	0.45	0.72	US 250 (Three Notch Road)	Grooms Lane	Dead End	
Mecklenburg	0.60	0.97	SR 640 (East Organville Road)	Parretts Dead End Road	Dead End	
Pittsylvania	2.30	3.70	SR 790 (Piney Road)	Terry Road	SR 672 (Cotton Patch Road)	
Prince William	0.57	0.92	SR 631 (Kahns Road)	Trails End Road Trails End Court	Cul-de-Sac	
Pulaski	0.12	0.19	SR 649 (Thaxton Road)	Jake Buford Avenue	Dead End	
Roanoke	0.28	0.45	SR 904 (Starkey Road)	Eden Avenue	SR 792 (Downing Street)	
Rockbridge	0.85	1.37	SR 39 (Maury River Road)	Furnace Hill Road	SR 747 (Palace Hotel Lane)	
Rockingham	0.70	1.13	SR 614 (Mechanicsville Road)	Byrd Orchard Road	SR 615 (Cold Spring Road/Radars Church Road)	
Scott	0.26	0.42	Dead End	Rattlers Haven Drive	SR 71	
Shenandoah	0.31	0.50	Dead End	Crider Lane	SR 623 (Back Road)	
Spotsylvania	0.43	0.69	SR 608 (Robert E Lee Drive)	East Robert E Lee Court	Cul-de-Sac	
Stafford	0.04	0.06	SR 739 (Holly Circle)	Heather Place	Dead End	
Tazewell	0.16	0.26	SR 801 (Sutherland Drive)	Lowe Lane	SR 637 (Cochran Hollow Road)	
Washington	0.40	0.64	SR 666 (Mock Knob Road)	Ketron Lane	Dead End	
Wise	0.33	0.53	Dead End	Aviation Road	SR 644 (Pole Bridge Road)	
York	0.26	0.42	SR 615 (Charles Road)	Victory Road	Dead End	
