= Virginia State Route 739 =

Secondary route designation

State Route 739

Route information
- Maintained by VDOT

Location
- Country: United States
- State: Virginia

Highway system
- Virginia Routes; Interstate; US; Primary; Secondary; Byways; History; HOT lanes

State Route 739 (SR 739) in the U.S. state of Virginia is a secondary route designation applied to multiple discontinuous road segments among the many counties. The list below describes the sections in each county that are designated SR 739.

== List ==
County	Length (mi)	Length (km)	From	Via	To	Notes
Accomack	0.15	0.24	SR 687/SR 688	Unnamed road	SR 687 (Bethel Church Road)	
Albemarle	0.03	0.05	Dead End	Ivy Depot Lane	SR 786 (Ivy Depot Road)	
Amherst	7.12	11.46	US 29	Boxwood Farm Road Honey Bee Drive	Nelson County line	
Augusta	3.90	6.28	SR 42 (Scenic Highway)	Moffet Branch Road Curry Road	SR 607 (Mount Solon Road)	
Bedford	2.10	3.38	SR 608 (Tolers Ferry Road)	Fairview Church Road	SR 732 (Clover Creek Road)	
Botetourt	0.10	0.16	Dead End	Tin Top Road	SR 43 (Narrow Passage Road)	
Campbell	0.04	0.06	US 460 Bus	Unnamed road	Lynchburg city limits	
Carroll	2.10	3.38	SR 635 (Fowlers Ferry Road)	Porterfield Road	SR 741 (Stoneman Road)	
Chesterfield	1.25	2.01	Cul-de-Sac	Omo Road	SR 10/SR 3025	Gap between segments ending at different points along SR 742
Dinwiddie	1.70	2.74	SR 751 (Cox Road)	Midway Road	SR 708 (Namozine Road)	
Fairfax	0.20	0.32	SR 738 (Old Dominion Drive)	Providence Terrace	Dead End	
Fauquier	1.14	1.83	SR 741 (Enon School Road)	Swains Road	Dead End	
Franklin	10.73	17.27	SR 602 (Callaway Road)	Gap Gate Road Bethany Road Bethlehem Road	US 220 (Virgil H Goode Highway)	Formerly SR 245
Frederick	8.81	14.18	US 522 (Frederick Pike)	Apple Pie Ridge Road	West Virginia state line	Formerly SR 261
Halifax	2.81	4.52	SR 621 (Newbill School Road)	T N Snow Road	SR 603 (Hunting Creek Road)	
Hanover	1.47	2.37	SR 715 (Beaver Dam Road)	Beaverdam School Road	SR 738 (Teman Road)	
Henry	0.28	0.45	SR 57 (Fairystone Park Highway)	Stanley Main Street	SR 903 (Henry Street)	
James City	0.08	0.13	SR 606/SR 735	Greenway Circle	Cul-de-Sac	
Loudoun	1.40	2.25	SR 765 (Ridgeside Road)	Austin Grove Road	SR 626 (Foggy Bottom Road)	
Louisa	0.68	1.09	SR 652 (Kentucky Springs Road)	Plum Tree Road	Dead End	
Mecklenburg	0.90	1.45	SR 637 (Chaptico Road)	Luck Circle Chaptico Road	Dead End	
Montgomery	0.20	0.32	Dead End	Gallimore Street	SR 738 (Blair Street)	
Pittsylvania	1.00	1.61	SR 969 (Sago Road)	Cooper Road	Dead End	
Prince William	0.12	0.19	Dead End	Woodbine Road	SR 3234 (Canova Drive)	
Pulaski	0.60	0.97	SR 643 (Thorn Springs Road)	Beaufort Hollow Road	Dead End	
Roanoke	1.25	2.01	Cul-de-Sac	Longview Road	SR 689 (Roselawn Road)	
Rockbridge	0.60	0.97	Dead End	Fox Hunt Road	US 11 (Lee Highway)	
Rockingham	1.25	2.01	Dead End	Witmer Lane Koogler Road Shoreshill Road	Dead End	Gap between segments ending at different points along SR 743
Scott	0.39	0.63	SR 614 (Yuma Road)	Charleston Street	Dead End	
Shenandoah	0.50	0.80	SR 42 (Senedo Road)	Harmony Lane	Dead End	
Spotsylvania	0.34	0.55	SR 620 (Harrison Road)	Dickenson Drive	SR 610 (Old Plank Road)	
Stafford	0.20	0.32	SR 730 (Lake Shore Drive)	Holly Circle	SR 791 (Heather Place)	
Tazewell	1.00	1.61	Dead End	Tin Can Alley	US 19	
Washington	0.90	1.45	SR 609 (Hillman Highway)	Ritchie Road	Dead End	
Wise	0.30	0.48	SR 605	Unnamed road	Dead End	
York	0.08	0.13	SR 717 (Old Landing Road)	Harbour Drive	Dead End	
