= Virginia State Route 679 =

State highway in Virginia, United States

State Route 679

Route information
- Maintained by VDOT

Location
- Country: United States
- State: Virginia

Highway system
- Virginia Routes; Interstate; US; Primary; Secondary; Byways; History; HOT lanes

State Route 679 (SR 679) in the U.S. State of Virginia is a secondary route designation applied to multiple discontinuous road segments among the many counties. The list below describes the sections in each county that are designated SR 679.

== List ==
| County | Length (mi) | Length (km) | From | Via | To | Notes |
|---|---|---|---|---|---|---|
| Accomack | 25.55 | 41.12 | US 13 (Lankford Highway) | Metompkin Road Atlantic Road Fleming Road State Line Road Bayfront Street Franklin City Road | Dead End | Gap between segments ending at different points along SR 187 Gap between SR 766 and SR 798 |
| Albemarle | 0.90 | 1.45 | Dead End | Grassmere Road | SR 738 (Morgantown Road) | |
| Alleghany | 0.10 | 0.16 | Dead End | Sweet Spring Lane | SR 311 (Kanawha Trail) | |
| Amelia | 1.00 | 1.61 | US 360 (Patrick Henry Highway) | Scottland Lane | Dead End | |
| Amherst | 0.10 | 0.16 | SR 130 (Elon Road) | Donigan Drive | Dead End | |
| Appomattox | 5.80 | 9.33 | SR 606 (New Chapel Road) | Double Bridges Road | SR 604 (Promise Land Road) | |
| Augusta | 2.90 | 4.67 | SR 681 (Mount Harmon Road) | Campbells Hollow Road | SR 682 (McKinley Road) | |
| Bath | 0.15 | 0.24 | SR 687 (Jackson River Turnpike) | Riners Lane | SR 687 (Jackson River Turnpike) | |
| Bedford | 0.40 | 0.64 | Dead End | Pony Acre Road | Bedford town limits | |
| Bland | 0.10 | 0.16 | Dead End | Depot Drive | US 52 (North Scenic Highway) | |
| Botetourt | 1.69 | 2.72 | SR 655 (Old Fincastle Road) | Pecks Lane Martins Lane | SR 681 (Poor Farm Road) | |
| Brunswick | 1.60 | 2.57 | SR 673 (Reavis Gin Road) | Travis Drive | SR 674 (Greentown Drive) | |
| Buchanan | 0.50 | 0.80 | SR 603 | Jakes Branch Road | Dead End | |
| Buckingham | 4.10 | 6.60 | SR 652 (Bridgeport Road) | Paynes Pond Road | SR 20 (Constitution Route) | |
| Campbell | 0.93 | 1.50 | US 29 (Wards Road) | Russell Woods Drive | Dead End | |
| Caroline | 1.20 | 1.93 | SR 669 (Trivette Road) | Country Road | Spotsylvania County line | |
| Carroll | 11.36 | 18.28 | North Carolina state line | Wards Gap Road Horton Road Windgate Drive | SR 670 (Snake Creek Road) | Gap between segments ending at different points along SR 691 Gap between segments ending at different points along SR 608 |
| Charlotte | 2.80 | 4.51 | SR 634 (Westview Farm Road) | Bailey Farm Road | SR 606 (Bacon School Road) | |
| Chesterfield | 0.35 | 0.56 | SR 653 (Courthouse Road) | Old Courthouse Road | SR 653 (Courthouse Road) | |
| Clarke | 1.55 | 2.49 | SR 7 (Harry Flood Byrd Highway) | Pine Grove Road | SR 7 (Harry Flood Byrd Highway) | |
| Craig | 0.10 | 0.16 | SR 678 (Brooks Street) | Unnamed road | SR 650 (Marshall Avenue) | |
| Culpeper | 1.35 | 2.17 | SR 663 (Alanthus Road) | Farley Road | Dead End | |
| Cumberland | 2.00 | 3.22 | SR 664 (Angola Road) | Angola Lane | SR 638 (Guinea Road) | |
| Dickenson | 3.55 | 5.71 | SR 671 | Unnamed road | Dead End | |
| Dinwiddie | 1.45 | 2.33 | Dead End | Unnamed road | SR 660 (Hardiways Mill Road) | |
| Essex | 0.25 | 0.40 | Dead End | Belmont Road | SR 624 (Essex Church Road) | |
| Fairfax | 0.75 | 1.21 | Herndon town limits | Crestview Drive | Loudoun County line | |
| Fauquier | 0.05 | 0.08 | SR 626 (Halfway Road) | Landmark Road | SR 628 (Landmark Road/Bust Head Road) | |
| Floyd | 10.58 | 17.03 | SR 681 (Franklin Pike) | Poor Farm Road Bethlehem Church Road | SR 615 (Christiansburg Pike) | |
| Fluvanna | 0.30 | 0.48 | Dead End | Center B Road | SR 643 (Transco Road) | |
| Franklin | 4.69 | 7.55 | Dead End | Charlie Road Truman Hill Road | SR 634 (Eton Road) | Gap between segments ending at different points along SR 678 |
| Frederick | 5.63 | 9.06 | SR 600 (Hayfield Road) | Indian Hollow Road | US 522 (Frederick Pike) | Gap between segments ending at different points along SR 654 |
| Giles | 2.40 | 3.86 | West Virginia state line | Dobbins Road East River Mountain Road Robertson Mountain Road | SR 649 (Lurich Road) | |
| Gloucester | 0.35 | 0.56 | SR 664 (Oscar Road) | Fox Mill Court | Cul-de-Sac | |
| Goochland | 0.16 | 0.26 | SR 605 (Shannon Hill Road) | Funny Tree Trail | Dead End | |
| Grayson | 2.40 | 3.86 | SR 601 (Old Bridle Creek Road) | Buck Mountain Road | SR 658 (Flatridge Road) | |
| Greensville | 0.50 | 0.80 | Dead End | Carpenter Road | SR 650 (Quarry Road) | |
| Halifax | 3.30 | 5.31 | SR 680 (Pleasant Grove Road) | Deer Run Road Union Grove Road | SR 681 (Union Church Road) | |
| Hanover | 0.84 | 1.35 | Dead End | Melton Road | SR 657 (Ashcake Road) | |
| Henry | 2.00 | 3.22 | SR 687 (Stones Dairy Road) | Jarette Drive | SR 698 (Crestridge Road) | |
| Isle of Wight | 0.95 | 1.53 | SR 709 (Waterworks Road) | Woody Acres Way Bethel Church Lane | Cul-de-Sac | |
| James City | 0.16 | 0.26 | US 60 (Richmond Road) | Crossover Road | SR 622 (Racefield Drive) | |
| King and Queen | 1.18 | 1.90 | SR 33 (Lewis Puller Memorial Highway) | Beaulah Road | SR 33 (Lewis Puller Memorial Highway) | |
| King George | 0.85 | 1.37 | SR 3 (Kings Highway) | Canterbury Loop | SR 3 (Kings Highway) | |
| King William | 0.70 | 1.13 | SR 633 (Powhatan Trail) | Mount Rose Road | Dead End | |
| Lee | 6.91 | 11.12 | SR 661 (Flatwoods Road) | Unnamed road | SR 758 (Flannery Ridge Road) | |
| Loudoun | 0.73 | 1.17 | SR 1902 (Atlantic Boulevard) | Woodland Road | SR 637 (Cascades Parkway) | |
| Louisa | 1.25 | 2.01 | SR 692 (Hickory Creek Road) | Firehouse Road | Dead End | |
| Lunenburg | 0.92 | 1.48 | SR 678 (Quail Roost Road) | Buckskin Road | SR 662 (Nutbush Road) | |
| Madison | 1.20 | 1.93 | Dead End | Deer Crossing Lane | SR 685 (Burnt Tree Way) | |
| Mathews | 0.54 | 0.87 | SR 660 (River Road) | Brittnay Lane | Dead End | |
| Mecklenburg | 2.92 | 4.70 | SR 92 | Hunters Lane | SR 671 (Country Club Drive) | |
| Middlesex | 0.35 | 0.56 | SR 640 (Waterview Road) | Rocks Drive | Dead End | |
| Montgomery | 1.80 | 2.90 | SR 669 (Union Valley Road) | Nolley Road | SR 615 (Pilot Road) | |
| Nelson | 2.20 | 3.54 | SR 666 (Dickie Road) | Level Green Road Castle Creek Lane | Dead End | Gap between segments ending at different points along SR 666 |
| New Kent | 0.90 | 1.45 | SR 609 (Talleysville Road) | Mount Prospect Road | SR 609 (Talleysville Road) | |
| Northampton | 0.90 | 1.45 | Dead End | Denwood Road | SR 617 (Bayford Road) | |
| Northumberland | 4.20 | 6.76 | SR 200 (Jesse DuPont Memorial Highway) | Crosshills Road | SR 200 (Jesse DuPont Memorial Highway) | Gap between segments ending at different points along SR 200 |
| Nottoway | 0.40 | 0.64 | Dead End | Mathews Mill Road | SR 604 (Stingy Lane Road) | |
| Orange | 0.80 | 1.29 | Dead End | Elijah Craig Road | SR 231 (Blue Ridge Turnpike) | |
| Page | 0.33 | 0.53 | SR 689 (Marksville Road) | Hill Top Circle | SR 689 (Marksville Road) | |
| Patrick | 1.24 | 2.00 | SR 727 (Poplar Drive/Wayside Park Road) | New Hope Church Road | SR 683 (High Point Church Road) | |
| Pittsylvania | 1.50 | 2.41 | SR 681 (Mountain Road) | Riceville Court | SR 640 (Riceville Road) | |
| Powhatan | 0.43 | 0.69 | SR 678 (Rocky Oak Road) | Rocky Oak Road | Dead End | |
| Prince Edward | 0.40 | 0.64 | US 360 (Kings Highway) | West Stokes Road | Dead End | |
| Pulaski | 1.45 | 2.33 | Cul-de-Sac | Viscoe Road | SR 114 (Peppers Ferry Boulevard) | |
| Rappahannock | 0.33 | 0.53 | US 211 (Lee Highway) | Goog Mountain Road | End of State Maintenance | |
| Richmond | 0.35 | 0.56 | SR 632 (Islington Road) | Silas Drive | Dead End | |
| Roanoke | 2.22 | 3.57 | SR 904 (Starkey Road) | Buck Mountain Road | US 220 (Franklin Road) | |
| Rockbridge | 5.81 | 9.35 | Dead End | Second Street Unnamed road Lone Jack Road Unnamed road | US 11 (Lee Highway) | Gap between segments ending at different points along SR 1105 Gap between segments ending at different points along SR 680 |
| Rockingham | 5.44 | 8.75 | Harrisonburg city limits | Pleasant Valley Road Battlefield Road | SR 253 (Port Republic Road) | Gap between segments ending at different points along SR 276 |
| Russell | 5.80 | 9.33 | SR 613 (Willow Spring Road/Collins Wood Road) | Thomas Warner Road Tumbez Hollow Road | SR 678 (Upper Copper Creek Road) | |
| Scott | 1.96 | 3.15 | SR 677 (Luray Road) | Rockland View Road Valley Creek Road | SR 671 (Addington Frame Road) | Gap between segments ending at different points along SR 675 |
| Shenandoah | 8.20 | 13.20 | SR 691 (Judge Rye Road) | Rittenour Road | SR 605 | |
| Smyth | 3.36 | 5.41 | SR 615 (Citizens Road) | Cline Road Dutton Road | US 11 (Lee Highway) | |
| Southampton | 2.60 | 4.18 | SR 684 (Monroe Road) | Mills Path Unnamed road | SR 685 (Whitley Branch Road) | |
| Spotsylvania | 1.10 | 1.77 | Caroline County line | Country Road | SR 738 (Partlow Road) | |
| Stafford | 0.95 | 1.53 | Dead End | Greenspring Drive | SR 684 (Mine Road) | |
| Sussex | 0.46 | 0.74 | SR 31 (Main Street) | Pine Street Unnamed road | SR 647 | |
| Tazewell | 0.40 | 0.64 | Dead End | Bowman Road | SR 644 (Abbs Valley Road) | |
| Warren | 2.02 | 3.25 | SR 619 (Rivermont Drive) | Unnamed road | SR 677 (Catlett Mountain Road) | |
| Washington | 0.16 | 0.26 | SR 663 (Country Park Road) | Gunsmith Lane | Dead End | |
| Westmoreland | 0.34 | 0.55 | Dead End | Branson Cove Road | SR 612 (Coles Point Road) | |
| Wise | 1.50 | 2.41 | Dead End | Unnamed road | SR 671 (South Fork Road) | |
| Wythe | 1.44 | 2.32 | SR 680 (Black Lick Road) | Radio Drive | FR-38/SR 729 | |
| York | 1.06 | 1.71 | SR 614 (Showalter Road) | Lindsay Landing Lane | Dead End | |
