= Virginia State Route 746 =

Secondary route designation

State Route 746

Route information
- Maintained by VDOT

Location
- Country: United States
- State: Virginia

Highway system
- Virginia Routes; Interstate; US; Primary; Secondary; Byways; History; HOT lanes

State Route 746 (SR 746) in the U.S. state of Virginia is a secondary route designation applied to multiple discontinuous road segments among the many counties. The list below describes the sections in each county that are designated SR 746.

== List ==
County	Length (mi)	Length (km)	From	Via	To	Notes
Accomack	0.15	0.24	SR 763 (Adams Road)	Lewis Road	SR 316 (Greenbush Road)	
Albemarle	1.20	1.93	SR 20 (Stony Point Road)	Fosters Branch Road	Dead End	
Amherst	0.55	0.89	SR 621 (Indian Creek Road)	Paige Mountain Way	Dead End	
Augusta	2.30	3.70	SR 745 (Mount Pisgah Road)	Todd Road Seawright Road	SR 804 (Salem Church Road)	
Bedford	12.25	19.71	SR 24 (Stewartsville Road)	Dickerson Mill Road	SR 122 (Moneta Road)	
Botetourt	0.25	0.40	Dead End	John Road	SR 606 (Blue Ridge Turnpike)	
Campbell	0.08	0.13	SR 660 (Oxford Furnace Road)	Grist Mill Road	Dead End	
Carroll	1.57	2.53	SR 745 (Stone Ridge Road)	Sunrise Drive	SR 620 (Coulson Church Road)	
Chesterfield	9.10	14.65	US 1/US 301 (Jefferson Davis Highway)	Ruffin Mill Road Enon Church Road	Anchor Landing Drive	
Dinwiddie	0.95	1.53	SR 708 (Namozine Road)	Birdnest Road	Dead End	
Fairfax	0.10	0.16	SR 988 (Valley Brook Drive)	Upside Court	Dead End	
Fauquier	0.93	1.50	Dead End	Mount Eccentric Road	SR 245 (Old Tavern Road)	
Franklin	0.50	0.80	SR 642 (Foothills Road)	Saw Ridge Road	Dead End	
Frederick	0.50	0.80	US 522 (Frederick Pike)	Ronner Lane	Dead End	
Halifax	8.93	14.37	SR 92/SR 1001 (South Main Street)	Mount Laurel Road	Charlotte County line	
Hanover	0.60	0.97	SR 684 (Verdon Road)	Noel Road	Caroline County line	
Henry	0.08	0.13	SR 701 (Field Avenue)	Recreation Road Mill Drive	SR 701 (Field Avenue)	Gap between segments ending at different points along SR 908
James City	2.80	4.51	SR 30/FR-827	Old Stage Road Unnamed road	SR 30 (Rochambeau Drive)	
Loudoun	1.60	2.57	SR 733 (Turkey Roost Street)	Beaverdam Bridge Road	SR 630 (JEB Stuart Road)	
Louisa	0.50	0.80	SR 623 (Chopping Road)	Old Farm Hollow Road	Dead End	
Mecklenburg	1.00	1.61	North Carolina state line	Ponderosa Lane	Dead End	
Montgomery	0.11	0.18	Dead End	Hillmont Lane	SR 737 (Thomas Lane)	
Pittsylvania	3.20	5.15	SR 750 (Mount Cross Road)	Golf Club Road	SR 863 (Golf Club Road/Lanier Mill Road)	
Prince William	1.56	2.51	SR 650 (Doves Lane)	Smithfield Road	Cul-de-Sac	
Pulaski	1.33	2.14	SR 747 (Old Route 11)	Old Giles Road Giles Avenue Old Giles Road	SR 100 (Clebone Road)	
Roanoke	0.37	0.60	Dead End	Wade Road	SR 694 (Twelve OClock Knob Road)	
Rockbridge	0.40	0.64	SR 39 (Maury River Road)	Paxton Drive	Dead End	
Rockingham	0.25	0.40	SR 42 (Main Street)	Herring Lane	SR 42 (John Wayland Highway/Main Street)	
Scott	0.19	0.31	SR 639	Unnamed road	Dead End	Gap between segments ending at different points along SR 614
Shenandoah	1.40	2.25	Dead End	Bonnet Hill Road	SR 600 (Zepp Road)	
Spotsylvania	0.05	0.08	Dead End	Sarah Lane	SR 711 (Rollingwood Drive)	
Stafford	0.13	0.21	SR 627 (Mountain View Road)	Ravenwood Drive	Dead End	
Washington	2.08	3.35	SR 745 (Old Saltworks Road)	Blackwell Chapel Road	Dead End	
York	0.23	0.37	Dead End	Pinehurst Drive	SR 658 (Yorkville Road)	
