= Virginia State Route 693 =

State highway in Virginia, United States

State Route 693

Route information
- Maintained by VDOT

Location
- Country: United States
- State: Virginia

Highway system
- Virginia Routes; Interstate; US; Primary; Secondary; Byways; History; HOT lanes

State Route 693 (SR 693) in the U.S. state of Virginia is a secondary route designation applied to multiple discontinuous road segments among the many counties. The list below describes the sections in each county that are designated SR 693.

== List ==
County	Length (mi)	Length (km)	From	Via	To	Notes
Accomack	7.36	11.84	SR 692 (Main Street)	Neal Parker Drive	SR 701 (Bullbeggar Road/Withams Road)	
Albemarle	3.20	5.15	SR 635 (Craig Store Road)	Burnt Mountain Road Stillhouse Creek Road	SR 692 (Plank Road)	
Alleghany	0.15	0.24	Dead End	Haynes Drive	SR 18 (Potts Creek Road)	
Amelia	0.10	0.16	Dead End	Ebenezer Road	SR 671 (Jetersville Road)	
Amherst	0.29	0.47	US 29 Bus	Lancer Lane	Dead End	
Appomattox	0.35	0.56	Dead End	Salt Lick Lane	SR 651 (Webb Mill Road)	
Augusta	15.69	25.25	SR 252 (Middlebrook Road)	Butler Road Sinking Springs Road Cherry Grove Road Berrymoore Road Bethel Green Road Stingy Hallow Road Cedar Creek Road	SR 254 (Parkersburg Turnpike)	Gap between segments ending at different points along SR 701 Gap between segments ending at different points along SR 694 Gap between segments ending at different points along SR 252
Bath	1.19	1.92	SR 687 (Jackson River Turnpike)	Draft Avenue	Dead End	
Bedford	4.30	6.92	SR 695 (Goose Creek Valley Road)	Statler Road Pike Road	Dead End	
Botetourt	2.00	3.22	SR 692 (Shiloh Church Road)	Woodson Road Allen Branch Road	SR 43 (Narrow Passage Road)	
Brunswick	1.10	1.77	SR 640 (Farmers Field Road)	Old Tobacco Road	SR 634 (Liberty Road)	
Buchanan	1.35	2.17	SR 631 (Middle Fork Road)	Crow Pass Road	Dead End	
Buckingham	0.80	1.29	Dead End	Wyland Road	SR 604 (Woodland Church Road)	
Campbell	2.20	3.54	SR 696 (Dearborn Road)	Chapel Grove Road	SR 692 (Masons Mill Road)	
Caroline	3.00	4.83	SR 694 (Courtney Road)	Herring Creek Road	SR 601 (Edgar Road)	
Carroll	3.20	5.15	SR 100 (Sylvatus Highway)	Sylvatus Smith Road	Pulaski County line	
Charlotte	2.80	4.51	SR 619 (Staunton Hill Road)	Terrell Road	SR 672 (Mount Carmel Road)	
Chesterfield	1.50	2.41	Dead End	Deer Range Road	US 360 (Hull Street Road)	
Craig	0.20	0.32	SR 654	Unnamed road	Dead End	
Culpeper	2.65	4.26	SR 624 (Oak Shade Road)	Scottsville Road	SR 802 (Springs Road)	
Cumberland	1.30	2.09	Dead End	Swann Road	SR 639 (Putney Road)	
Dickenson	0.62	1.00	Dead End	Bartley Street	SR 83	
Dinwiddie	2.87	4.62	SR 703 (Carson Road)	Williamson Road	SR 670 (Old Stage Road)	
Essex	0.47	0.76	Dead End	Lane Drive	SR 620 (Dunbrooke Road)	
Fairfax	2.53	4.07	Arlington County line	Westmoreland Street	SR 3547 (Chain Bridge Road)	
Fauquier	0.80	1.29	US 29 (Lee Highway)	Old Alexandria Turnpike	SR 674 (Georgetown Road/Village Drive)	
Floyd	1.00	1.61	SR 695 (Galen Lane)	Needmore Lane	SR 615 (Christiansburg Pike)	
Fluvanna	0.60	0.97	SR 639 (Long Acre Road)	Bluebird Lane	Dead End	
Franklin	5.26	8.47	SR 739 (Bethlehem Road)	Green Level Road	US 220 (Virgil H Goode Highway)	
Frederick	4.85	7.81	US 522 (Frederick Pike)	Collinsville Road	SR 600 (Brush Creek Road)	
Giles	0.18	0.29	Dead End	Shady Grove Lane	SR 605 (Spruce Run Road)	
Gloucester	1.34	2.16	SR 690 (Flat Iron Road)	Daffodil Lane	Dead End	
Goochland	0.60	0.97	Dead End	Martin Road	SR 605 (Shannon Hill Road)	
Grayson	1.20	1.93	US 58 (Grayson Parkway)	Sugar Shack Road	SR 274 (Riverside Drive)	
Greensville	1.50	2.41	SR 604	Bowen Road	SR 633 (Independence Church Road)	
Halifax	3.95	6.36	North Carolina state line	Pointer Road	North Carolina state line	
Hanover	2.20	3.54	SR 619 (Rockhill Road)	Flannigan Mill Road	SR 606 (Old Church Road)	
Henry	1.50	2.41	North Carolina state line	DeShazo Road	SR 629 (Moores Mill Road)	
Isle of Wight	0.30	0.48	Dead End	Gayle Way	SR 711 (New Towne Haven Lane)	
James City	0.15	0.24	SR 606	Pleasant Point Road	SR 642 (Four Mile Tree Road)	
King and Queen	0.40	0.64	Dead End	Level Green Road	SR 721 (Newtown Road)	
King George	0.11	0.18	SR 683 (Ferry Dock Road)	Townsend Drive	Dead End	
Lancaster	0.46	0.74	SR 655 (Queenstown Road)	Cow Shed Road	Dead End	
Lee	1.01	1.63	Tennessee state line	Unnamed road	US 58 (Daniel Boone Trail)	
Loudoun	4.50	7.24	SR 690 (Mountain Road)	Morrisonville Road Ash George Road	SR 694 (John Wolford Road)	
Louisa	3.80	6.12	US 33 (Louisa Road)	Kents Mill Road	SR 613 (Oakland Road)	
Lunenburg	0.35	0.56	SR 49 (Earl Davis Gregory Highway)	Falls Hunt Club Road	SR 652 (Marshall Town Road)	
Madison	0.55	0.89	SR 654 (Perrys Mill Road)	Hampton Village Road	Dead End	
Mathews	0.62	1.00	Dead End	Buzzard Point Road	SR 645 (Aarons Beach Road)	
Mecklenburg	2.60	4.18	SR 703 (Sullivan Road)	Roger Road	SR 848 (Moss Lane)	
Middlesex	2.94	4.73	SR 640 (Waterview Road)	Corbin Hall Drive	Dead End	
Montgomery	7.18	11.56	SR 613	Graysontown Road Childress Road	SR 8 (Riner Road)	
Nelson	2.48	3.99	SR 722 (Rockfish Crossing Road)	Salem Road	SR 617 (Rockfish River Road)	
Northampton	0.33	0.53	Dead End	Wainhouse Road	Dead End	
Northumberland	0.70	1.13	SR 606 (Cloverdale Road)	Guarding Point Lane	Dead End	
Orange	0.60	0.97	SR 20 (Constitution Highway)	Montpelier Road	SR 641 (Montpelier Road/Liberty Mills Road)	
Page	0.41	0.66	Dead End	Trenton Avenue	Dead End	
Patrick	4.28	6.89	SR 626 (Abram Penn Highway)	Salem Church Road Mountain View Church Road	SR 687 (Pleasant View Drive/Bull Mountain Road)	
Pittsylvania	1.00	1.61	North Carolina state line	Chaneys Store Road	SR 735 (Mountain Hill Road)	
Prince Edward	1.60	2.57	Dead End	Campbell Hill Road	SR 626 (Pin Oak Road)	
Prince George	1.45	2.33	SR 641 (Moody Road)	Coggins Point Road	Dead End	
Prince William	1.50	2.41	SR 689 (Signal Hill Road)	Birmingham Road	Dead End	
Pulaski	18.94	30.48	Carroll County line	Julia Simpkins Road Lead Mine Road	Montgomery County line	
Richmond	0.30	0.48	Dead End	Carter Town Road	SR 624 (Newland Road)	
Roanoke	0.64	1.03	Dead End	Franklin Street	Salem city limits	
Rockbridge	1.52	2.45	Dead End	Unnamed road	FR-55	Gap between segments ending at different points along SR 610
Rockingham	1.90	3.06	SR 867 (North River Road)	Fairview Road	SR 995 (Koiner Ford Road)	
Russell	2.26	3.64	SR 682 (Castle Run Road)	Red Bud Road Red Bud Drive	SR 604 (Copper Ridge Road)	
Scott	3.60	5.79	Tennessee state line	Unnamed road Eaton Hill Road	SR 696	
Shenandoah	3.10	4.99	SR 614 (South Middle Road)	Polk Road	SR 707	
Smyth	0.15	0.24	US 11 (Lee Highway)	Unnamed road	Dead End	
Southampton	3.53	5.68	SR 665	Garris Mill Road	SR 35 (Meherrin Road)	
Spotsylvania	0.40	0.64	SR 608 (Robert E Lee Drive)	Glady Fork Road	Dead End	
Stafford	0.15	0.24	SR 3 (Kings Highway)	Graham Street	Dead End	
Tazewell	0.15	0.24	Dead End	Unnamed road	SR 632 (Pisgah Road)	
Washington	2.42	3.89	SR 699 (Walden Road)	Litchfield Road	SR 700 (Rich Valley Road)	
Westmoreland	1.97	3.17	SR 609 (Stratford Hall Road)	South Independence Drive	SR 1601/SR 1609	
Wise	1.45	2.33	US 23 Bus	Unnamed road Old Indian Creek Road	US 23 Bus	
Wythe	0.23	0.37	US 11 (Lee Highway)	Underpass Drive	SR 666	
York	1.47	2.37	SR 634 (Old York Road)	Wormley Creek Drive	Cul-de-Sac	
