= Virginia State Route 744 =

Secondary route designation

State Route 744

Route information
- Maintained by VDOT

Location
- Country: United States
- State: Virginia

Highway system
- Virginia Routes; Interstate; US; Primary; Secondary; Byways; History; HOT lanes

State Route 744 (SR 744) in the U.S. state of Virginia is a secondary route designation applied to multiple discontinuous road segments among the many counties. The list below describes the sections in each county that are designated SR 744.

== List ==
County	Length (mi)	Length (km)	From	Via	To	Notes
Accomack	1.10	1.77	US 13 (Lankford Highway)	Cherry Hill Road	Dead End	
Albemarle	1.15	1.85	US 250 (Richmond Road)	Hacktown Road Hunt Club Road	SR 22 (Louisa Road)	Gap between segments ending at different points along SR 731
Amherst	0.30	0.48	SR 604 (Bobwhite Road)	Eagle Road	Dead End	
Augusta	1.79	2.88	SR 626 (Limestone Road)	Leaport Road	SR 616 (Fort Defiance Road/Morningside Drive)	Gap between segments ending at different points along SR 742
Bedford	1.80	2.90	SR 680 (Wheatland Road)	Von Roy Road	SR 681 (Magnolia Drive)	
Botetourt	0.10	0.16	US 220 (Botetourt Road)	Pine Crest Road	Dead End	
Campbell	0.04	0.06	SR 1520	Laxton Road	Lynchburg city limits	
Carroll	0.91	1.46	SR 705 (Coon Ridge Road)	Goodspur Road	Dead End	
Chesterfield	0.29	0.47	US 360 (Hull Street Road)	Unnamed road	Dead End	
Dinwiddie	0.70	1.13	SR 644 (Brills Road)	McKissicks Road	Dead End	
Fairfax	1.01	1.63	SR 698 (Cedar Lane)	Hilltop Road Lee Highway Frontage Road	FR-1001 (Lee Highway Frontage Road)	
Fauquier	2.88	4.63	US 15 (James Madison Highway)	Lovers Lane Shipmadilly Lane	Dead End	
Franklin	3.10	4.99	SR 643 (Dillons Mill Road)	Webster Corner Road	SR 726 (Wades Gap Road)	
Frederick	0.33	0.53	Winchester city limits	Woodstock Lane	SR 1234 (Hilltop Terrace)	
Halifax	11.20	18.02	Dead End	Stewart Trail Shady Grove Church Road East Hyco Road Riverdale Drive	US 58 (Philpott Road)	
Hanover	1.40	2.25	Dead End	Dude Ranch Road	SR 730 (Gordons Lane)	
Henry	0.20	0.32	Dead End	Dogwood Lane	SR 682 (River Road)	
Loudoun	2.50	4.02	SR 790 (Newlin Mill Road)	Snake Hill Road	SR 626 (Foxcroft Road)	
Louisa	1.02	1.64	Dead End	Amick Road	US 33 (Louisa Road)	
Mecklenburg	1.20	1.93	Charlotte County line	Gareenhouse Road	SR 47	
Montgomery	0.70	1.13	SR 655 (Long Shop Road/Mount Zion Road)	Whittaker Hollow Road	Dead End	
Pittsylvania	5.96	9.59	SR 743 (Orphange Road)	Ridgecrest Drive Mount Hermon Road Crane Road Lester Lane	Dead End	Gap between segments ending at different points along SR 41 Gap between segments ending at different points along SR 719
Prince William	1.41	2.27	Dead End	Van Doren Road	SR 806 (Token Valley Road)	
Pulaski	0.34	0.55	Dead End	Lavender Road	SR 636 (Alum Springs Road)	
Roanoke	2.08	3.35	SR 607 (Bottom Creek Road)	Rocky Road	US 221 (Bent Mountain Road)	
Rockbridge	1.60	2.57	SR 702 (Quarry Lane)	Flower Lane	Dead End	
Rockingham	0.70	1.13	SR 745 (Martin Miller Road)	Dry Hollow Road	SR 257 (Ottobine Road)	
Scott	0.66	1.06	US 23 (Main Street)	Jennings Street Legion Street	US 23 (Main Street)	
Shenandoah	0.68	1.09	SR 870 (Deer Rapids Road)	Deer Rapids Road	SR 648 (Sandy Hook Road)	
Spotsylvania	0.26	0.42	SR 620 (Harrison Road)	Dogwood Avenue	SR 610 (Old Plank Road)	
Stafford	0.27	0.43	SR 743 (Mimosa Street)	Rumford Road	SR 3 (Kings Highway)	
Tazewell	1.00	1.61	US 19/US 460	Triangle Road	Dead End	
Washington	1.90	3.06	SR 80 (Hayters Gap Road)	Smith Chapel Road	SR 737 (College Drive)	Gap between segments ending at different points along SR 740
Wise	0.35	0.56	Dead End	Unnamed road	SR 621	
York	0.51	0.82	SR 604 (Barlow Road)	Carters Neck Road	Dead End	
