= Virginia State Route 742 =

Secondary route designation

State Route 742

Route information
- Maintained by VDOT

Location
- Country: United States
- State: Virginia

Highway system
- Virginia Routes; Interstate; US; Primary; Secondary; Byways; History; HOT lanes

State Route 742 (SR 742) in the U.S. state of Virginia is a secondary route designation applied to multiple discontinuous road segments among the many counties. The list below describes the sections in each county that are designated SR 742.

== List ==
County	Length (mi)	Length (km)	From	Via	To	Notes
Accomack	1.30	2.09	SR 679 (Metompkin Road)	Baker Road	Dead End	
Albemarle	2.69	4.33	SR 20 (Scottsville Road)	Avon Street	Charlottesville city limits	
Amherst	0.30	0.48	Dead End	Stirling Drive	SR 729 (Chestnut Lane)	
Augusta	13.81	22.23	Cul-de-Sac	Shutterlee Mill Lane Shutterlee Mill Road Lebanon Church Road Mount Pisgah Road Willow Spout Road Toll Gate Road Bailey Road	SR 927 (Pine Top Road)	Gap between segments ending at different points along SR 613 Gap between segments ending at different points along US 11
Bedford	0.60	0.97	Dead End	Wineberry Lane	SR 644 (Coffee Road)	
Botetourt	0.27	0.43	SR 43 (Second Street)	Branch Road	SR 734 (Indian Lane)	
Campbell	0.54	0.87	US 460 (Lynchburg Highway)	Taylor Place	US 460 (Lynchburg Highway)	
Carroll	6.02	9.69	SR 620/SR 735	Monorat Road McGhee Road	SR 635 (Stoots Mountain Road/Folwers Ferry Road)	
Chesterfield	0.50	0.80	SR 10 (Iron Bridge Road)	Canasta Drive Old Zion Hill Road	SR 638 (Cogbill Road)	
Dinwiddie	0.50	0.80	SR 613 (Squirrel Level Road)	Plantation Road	SR 675 (Vaughan Road)	
Fairfax	0.34	0.55	Loudoun County line	Herndon Road	SR 609 (Pleasant Valley Road)	
Fauquier	0.36	0.58	Dead End	Wheatley School Road	SR 688 (Leeds Manor Road)	
Franklin	10.36	16.67	SR 641 (Callaway Road)	Bethany Road Dugspur Road Cahas Mountain Road	SR 739 (Bethlehem Road)	Gap between segments ending at different points along SR 739 Gap between segments ending at different points along SR 643
Frederick	0.40	0.64	SR 671 (Cedar Hill Road)	Brown Lane	Dead End	
Halifax	2.19	3.52	US 58 (Bill Tuck Highway)	Alphonse Dairy Road	US 58 (Bill Tuck Highway)	
Hanover	1.36	2.19	SR 606 (Studley Road)	Pollard Creek Road	Dead End	
Henry	0.13	0.21	SR 627 (Hodges Farm Road)	Mount Bethel Church Circle	SR 627 (Hodges Farm Road)	
James City	0.68	1.09	SR 613 (News Road)	Old News Road	SR 5000 (Monticello Avenue)	
Loudoun	1.88	3.03	Fairfax County line	Poland Road	US 50 (John S Mosby Highway)	
Louisa	0.45	0.72	Dead End	Pinchtown Road	SR 669 (Ellisville Drive)	
Mecklenburg	0.18	0.29	SR 49	Keel Drive	SR 92	
Montgomery	0.62	1.00	Dead End	Archer Road	SR 639 (Mount Pleasant Road)	
Pittsylvania	1.76	2.83	SR 724 (Mill Creek Road)	Walnut Creek Road	SR 743 (Orphanage Road)	
Prince William	0.07	0.11	SR 743 (F Street)	Green Drive	SR 741 (G Street)	
Pulaski	0.41	0.66	Dead End	Warden Court	Dead End	
Rockbridge	0.10	0.16	Dead End	Maury Hills Drive	SR 39 (Maury River Road)	
Rockingham	5.57	8.96	SR 257/SR 613	Waggys Creek Road Union Springs Road Fox Den Road Robinson Road	SR 613 (Clover Hill Road)	
Scott	0.32	0.51	SR 71	Loop Circle	SR 71	
Shenandoah	1.90	3.06	SR 720 (Crooked Run Road)	Georgetown Road	SR 764 (Walker Road)	
Spotsylvania	0.54	0.87	SR 667 (Robinson Road)	Timberbrook Lane	Cul-de-Sac	
Stafford	0.27	0.43	US 1 (Jefferson Davis Highway)	Jumping Branch Road	Dead End	
Washington	0.80	1.29	SR 80 (Hayters Gap Road)	Logan Creek Road	SR 743 (Yellow Springs Road)	
Wise	0.90	1.45	Dead End	Unnamed road	US 23 Bus	
York	0.15	0.24	SR 621 (Dare Road)	Burcher Road	Dead End	
