= Virginia State Route 673 =

State highway in Virginia, United States

State Route 673

Route information
- Maintained by VDOT

Location
- Country: United States
- State: Virginia

Highway system
- Virginia Routes; Interstate; US; Primary; Secondary; Byways; History; HOT lanes

State Route 673 (SR 673) in the U.S. state of Virginia is a secondary route designation applied to multiple discontinuous road segments among the many counties. The list below describes the sections in each county that are designated SR 673.

== List ==
County	Length (mi)	Length (km)	From	Via	To	Notes
Accomack	1.91	3.07	SR 675 (Justisville Road)	Wonney Raw Road Airport Road Bennett Street	SR 316 (Cossatt Avenue)	Gap between segments ending at different points along SR 658
Albemarle	3.81	6.13	SR 674 (Sugar Ridge Road)	Slam Gate Road	SR 810 (Browns Gap Turnpike)	
Alleghany	0.20	0.32	SR 311 (Kanawha Trail)	Stone Road	SR 311 (Kanawha Trail)	
Amelia	1.50	2.41	SR 616 (Genito Road)	Foster Lane	Dead End	
Amherst	0.50	0.80	SR 604 (Coolwell Drive)	Crescent Lane	US 29 Bus	
Appomattox	0.20	0.32	SR 611 (Trinity Road)	Tiny Road	SR 667 (Falling Creek Road)	
Augusta	0.80	1.29	Dead End	Old Quarry Lane	SR 662 (Stover School Road)	
Bath	0.23	0.37	SR 39 (Mountain Valley Road)	Massies Drive	SR 662 (Edgewood Lane)	
Bedford	1.53	2.46	SR 671 (Centerville Road)	Benchmark Lane	SR 644 (Lankford Mill Road)	
Botetourt	1.30	2.09	SR 720 (Amsterdam Road)	Greenfield Street	SR 670 (Trinity Road)	
Brunswick	3.90	6.28	SR 611 (Dry Bread Road)	Reavis Gin Road	SR 715 (Iron Bridge Road)	
Buchanan	1.29	2.08	SR 83	War Fork Road	Dead End	
Buckingham	1.20	1.93	Dead End	Virginia Mill Road	Dead End	
Campbell	0.30	0.48	SR 692 (Masons Mill Road)	Magaron Lane	Dead End	
Caroline	0.30	0.48	SR 2 (Fredericksburg Turnpike)	Old Grain Road	Dead End	
Carroll	3.30	5.31	US 58 (Danville Pike)	Pilgrims Trail	US 221 (Floyd Pike)	
Charlotte	0.50	0.80	Dead End	Cedar Grove Road	SR 617 (Old Well Road)	
Chesterfield	3.56	5.73	SR 1223 (Framar Drive)	Old Gun Road	Richmond city limits	
Clarke	0.11	0.18	SR 700 (Jack Enders Boulevard)	Blue Ridge Street	Dead End	
Craig	0.18	0.29	SR 653	Unnamed road	SR 693	
Culpeper	5.57	8.96	SR 672 (Stones Mill Road)	Newbys Shop Road	US 15 Bus	
Cumberland	2.60	4.18	SR 600 (River Road)	Ligontown Road	SR 638 (Guinea Road)	
Dickenson	0.70	1.13	Dead End	Unnamed road	SR 627	
Dinwiddie	1.77	2.85	SR 670 (Duncan Road)	Smith Grove Road	SR 613 (Squirrel Level Road)	
Essex	0.61	0.98	Dead End	Poplar Grove Road	SR 605 (White Marsh Road)	
Fairfax	7.15	11.51	SR 5345 (Quincy Adams Road)	McLearen Road Lawyers Road Courthouse Road	SR 123 (Chain Bridge Road)	Gap between segments ending at different points along the Vienna town limits
Fauquier	2.81	4.52	SR 694 (Old Bust Head Road)	Fosters Fork Road Baldwin Street	Dead End	Gap between segments ending at different points along US 29
Floyd	4.43	7.13	SR 679 (Bethlehem Church Road)	Coles Knob Road	SR 670 (Goff Road)	Gap between segments ending at different points along SR 612
Fluvanna	0.38	0.61	SR 649 (Central Plains Road)	Bethel Church Road	US 15 (James Madison Highway)	
Franklin	7.99	12.86	SR 646 (Doe Run Road)	Pigg River Road Jacks Mountain Road Simmons Creek Road	SR 834 (Brooks Mill Road)	Gap between segments ending at different points along SR 40
Frederick	3.20	5.15	US 522 (Frederick Pike)	Golds Hill Road Glendobbin Road	SR 663 (Payne Road)	
Giles	1.25	2.01	Dead End	Penvir Road	SR 724 (Old Wolf Creek Road)	
Gloucester	0.70	1.13	SR 198 (Dutton Road)	Freeport Road	Dead End	
Goochland	6.91	11.12	SR 606 (Hadensville-Fife Road)	Whitehall Road	US 522 (Sandy Hook Road)	
Grayson	2.60	4.18	Dead End	Hillandale Lane Bethel Road Falls Road	SR 668 (Big Ridge Road)	Gap between segments ending at different points along SR 658 Gap between segments ending at different points along SR 662
Greene	0.31	0.50	SR 621 (South River Road)	Robin Lane	Dead End	
Greensville	0.06	0.10	SR 672 (Stuart Street)	Turner Lane	Cul-de-Sac	
Halifax	0.90	1.45	SR 57 (Chatham Road)	Farmer Trail	Dead End	
Hanover	6.05	9.74	SR 271 (Pouncey Tract Road)	Howards Mill Road Waltons Tavern Road	US 33 (Mountain Road)	Gap between segments ending at different points along SR 611
Henry	2.72	4.38	SR 57 Alt	Bullocks Drive Sunset Drive	SR 672 (Bassett Heights Road Extension)	Gap between segments ending at different points along SR 57
Isle of Wight	8.84	14.23	SR 621 (Burwells Bay Road)	Purvis Lane Unnamed road Morgarts Beach Road	SR 674 (Blounts Corner Road)	Gap between FR-662 and SR 10 Bus
James City	0.67	1.08	Dead End	Cypress Drive	SR 715 (North Riverside Drive)	
King and Queen	0.79	1.27	SR 619 (Owens Mill Road)	Martin Town Road	Dead End	
King George	0.13	0.21	Dead End	Duclos Lane	SR 672 (Austin Drive)	
King William	2.40	3.86	End Loop	Pamunkey River Road Lay Landing Road Pocahontas Trail	SR 633 (Powhatan Trail)	
Lancaster	1.60	2.57	Dead End	River Wood Drive	SR 614 (Devils Bottom Road)	
Lee	1.75	2.82	Dead End	Unnamed road	Dead End	
Loudoun	10.90	17.54	SR 680 (Axline Road)	Evan Road Irish Corner Road Broad Way Milltown Road Featherbed Lane Bald Hill Road	SR 663 (Taylorsville Road)	Gap between segments ending at different points along SR 665
Louisa	0.40	0.64	SR 654 (Bagby Road)	Lewis Hill Lane	Dead End	
Lunenburg	1.30	2.09	Dead End	Parson Lane	SR 671 (Reedy Creek Road)	
Madison	0.80	1.29	SR 652 (Ruth Road)	Mud Road Cedar Hill Road	US 29 Bus (Main Street)	Gap between segments ending at different points along SR 231
Mathews	0.60	0.97	Dead End	Pepper Creek Road	SR 603 (belleview Road)	
Mecklenburg	0.20	0.32	SR 669 (Baskerville Road)	Busy Bee Road	SR 663 (Cedar Grove Road)	
Middlesex	0.51	0.82	SR 33 (General Puller Highway)	Edgewater Road	Dead End	
Montgomery	2.50	4.02	SR 672 (Camp Carysbrook Road)	Camp Carysbrook Road	SR 8 (Riner Road)	
Nelson	2.20	3.54	SR 151 (Patrick Henry Highway)	Shaeffers Hollow Road	Dead End	
New Kent	0.82	1.32	SR 600 (Holly Fork Road)	Stewart Road	Cul-de-Sac	
Northampton	0.40	0.64	SR 600 (Seaside Road)	Harrington Drive	Dead End	
Northumberland	0.87	1.40	SR 644 (Blackberry Road)	Taylors Beach Road	Dead End	
Nottoway	0.75	1.21	Dead End	Broad Acres Road	SR 606 (Cottage Road)	
Orange	2.60	4.18	SR 700 (Trimmers Road)	Old Rapidan Road	SR 615 (Rapidan Road)	
Page	1.10	1.77	SR 603 (Fleeburg Road)	Fleeburg Loop	Dead End	
Patrick	1.51	2.43	SR 676 (Ahart Ridge Road)	Sky View Drive	SR 677 (County Line Road)	
Pittsylvania	1.70	2.74	SR 40 (Gretna Road)	Ben Annie Road	SR 665 (Rockford School Road)	
Powhatan	0.90	1.45	Dead End	Reams Road	SR 678 (Rocky Oak Road)	
Prince Edward	0.10	0.16	US 360 (Kings Highway)	Robin Lawn Drive	Dead End	
Prince George	0.06	0.10	SR 604 (Halifax Road)	Woods Road	US 301	Formerly SR 141Y
Prince William	0.10	0.16	Dead End	Annapolis Way	US 1 (Jefferson Davis Highway)	
Pulaski	0.30	0.48	SR 649 (Thaxton Road)	Extension Street	SR 753 (Crockett Avenue)	
Rappahannock	0.55	0.89	SR 662 (Little Long Mountain Road)	Shootz Hollow Road	Dead End	
Richmond	0.84	1.35	Dead End	Lanier Road	SR 606 (Simonson Road)	
Roanoke	0.73	1.17	SR 1275 (Fountain Lane)	Lindenwood Drive Unnamed road	SR 724 (Parkview Circle)	
Rockbridge	0.90	1.45	SR 672 (Enfield Road)	Wee Darnock Way	SR 641	
Rockingham	0.80	1.29	SR 672 (Latimer Road/Mill Creek Church Road)	Mill Creek Church Road	SR 253 (Port Republic Road)	
Russell	5.20	8.37	SR 657 (Church Hill Road)	Morning Star Circle	SR 657 (Church Hill Road)	
Scott	4.60	7.40	SR 672 (Ponderosa Road)	Unnamed road Saratoga Lane	SR 678	Gap between segments ending at different points along SR 670
Shenandoah	1.20	1.93	US 11 (Old Valley Pike)	Aileen Road	Dead End	
Smyth	0.50	0.80	Dead End	Eagle Mountain Road	SR 672 (Slabtown Road)	
Southampton	10.32	16.61	North Carolina state line	Statesville Road Cypress Bridge Road Main Street Unnamed road Grays Shop Road	SR 35 (Meherrin Road)	
Spotsylvania	2.16	3.48	SR 628 (Smith Station Road)	Piedmont Drive	SR 620 (Harrison Road)	
Stafford	0.72	1.16	Dead End	Lorenzo Drive	SR 603 (Caisson Road)	
Sussex	0.23	0.37	US 460	Sylvan Road	Dead End	
Warren	1.83	2.95	Dead End	McCoys Ford Road	SR 619 (Mountain Road)	
Washington	2.80	4.51	Tennessee state line	Twin Oaks Road Drake Road	SR 759 (Drake Road/Horizon Drive)	
Westmoreland	0.20	0.32	Dead End	Cedar Field Road	SR 621 (Nomini Grove Road)	
Wise	0.80	1.29	SR 634 (Bean Gap Road)	Unnamed road	Dead End	
Wythe	7.10	11.43	SR 749 (Cedar Springs Road)	Porter Road Hawthorne Hollow Road Unnamed road	SR 675	Gap between segments ending at different points along SR 670 Gap between segments ending at different points along SR 674
York	0.20	0.32	SR 718 (Back Creek Road)	Parker Lane	Dead End	
