= Virginia State Route 738 =

Secondary route designation

State Route 738

Route information
- Maintained by VDOT

Location
- Country: United States
- State: Virginia

Highway system
- Virginia Routes; Interstate; US; Primary; Secondary; Byways; History; HOT lanes

State Route 738 (SR 738) in the U.S. state of Virginia is a secondary route designation applied to multiple discontinuous road segments among the many counties. The list below describes the sections in each county that are designated SR 738.

== List ==
County	Length (mi)	Length (km)	From	Via	To	Notes
Accomack	0.40	0.64	US 13 (Lankford Highway)	Kinsey Drive	SR 679 (Metompkin Road)	
Albemarle	2.20	3.54	US 250 (Ivy Road)	Morgantown Road	US 250 (Ivy Road)	
Amherst	0.50	0.80	SR 610 (Turkey Mountain Road)	Walnut Hill Road	Dead End	
Augusta	0.70	1.13	Dead End	Roudabush Lane	SR 42 (Scenic Highway)	
Bedford	1.70	2.74	SR 626 (Smith Mountain Lake Parkway)	Fancy Grove Road	SR 805 (Stone Mountain Road)	
Botetourt	3.83	6.16	US 221/US 460	Webster Road	US 221/US 460	
Campbell	4.68	7.53	SR 24 (Colonial Highway)	Greenhouse Road English Tavern Road	US 29 (Wards Road)	Gap between segments ending at different points along SR 754
Carroll	2.05	3.30	SR 602 (Brush Creek Road)	Scratch Gravel Road	SR 94 (Ivanhoe Road)	
Chesterfield	0.23	0.37	Dead End	Briggs Road	Dead End	
Dinwiddie	1.33	2.14	SR 645 (Wheelers Pond Road/Scotts Road)	Scotts Road	SR 647 (Nash Road)	
Fairfax	6.27	10.09	Dead End	Old Dominion Drive	SR 123/SR 309	
Fauquier	5.26	8.47	SR 689 (Dudie Road)	Wilson Road	SR 733 (John Barton Payne Road)	
Franklin	2.90	4.67	SR 742 (Bethany Road)	Custers Ridge Road	SR 641 (Callaway Road)	
Frederick	0.78	1.26	SR 758 (Belle View Lane)	Ogden Lane	Dead End	
Halifax	9.11	14.66	North Carolina state line	Cemetery Road Kingswood Road	SR 658 (Virgie Cole Road)	
Hanover	20.58	33.12	Caroline County line	Teman Road Old Ridge Road	SR 646 (Hickory Hill Road)	Formerly SR 1
Henry	0.75	1.21	Dead End	Norman Lane	SR 625 (Martin Lane)	
Loudoun	1.67	2.69	SR 711 (Piggott Bottom Road)	Hampton Road	SR 9 (Charles Town Pike)	
Louisa	0.65	1.05	Dead End	Smith Family Road	SR 605 (Shannon Hill Road)	
Mecklenburg	4.60	7.40	SR 737 (Nelson Church Road)	Beech Creek Road	SR 49	Gap between segments ending at the North Carolina state line
Montgomery	0.28	0.45	SR 763 (Spring View Drive)	Blair Street	US 11 (Radford Road)	
Pittsylvania	0.65	1.05	Dead End	Bailess Drive	SR 640 (Renan Road)	
Prince William	0.33	0.53	Dead End	Old Stage Road	Dead End	
Pulaski	12.90	20.76	Bland County line	Robinson Tract Road	SR 99	
Rockbridge	0.40	0.64	SR 611 (South Buffalo Road)	Rapps Mill Lane	Dead End	
Rockingham	5.99	9.64	SR 613 (Clover Hill Road)	Dry River Road	Bridgewater town limits	Gap between segments ending at different points along SR 257
Scott	0.19	0.31	SR 614 (Yuma Road)	Kermit Road	SR 739 (Charleston Street)	
Shenandoah	1.62	2.61	Dead End	Knupp Road	SR 614 (South Middle Road)	Gap between segments ending at different points along SR 613
Spotsylvania	12.53	20.17	Caroline County line	Partlow Road	SR 208 (Courthouse Road)/SR 606 (Morris Road)	Formerly SR 1
Stafford	0.15	0.24	SR 731 (Hampton Drive)	Carroll Circle	Cul-de-Sac	
Tazewell	0.75	1.21	SR 603 (College Estates Road)	G. I. Brown Road	Dead End	
Washington	0.86	1.38	SR 80 (Lindell Road)	Ryan Road Walker Lane	SR 609 (Hillman Highway)	
Wise	1.26	2.03	SR 620 (Guest River Road)	Unnamed road	Dead End	
York	0.14	0.23	Dead End	Oyster Cove Road	SR 658 (Yorkville Road)	
