= Virginia State Route 780 =

Secondary route designation

State Route 780

Route information
- Maintained by VDOT

Location
- Country: United States
- State: Virginia

Highway system
- Virginia Routes; Interstate; US; Primary; Secondary; Byways; History; HOT lanes

State Route 780 (SR 780) in the U.S. state of Virginia is a secondary route designation applied to multiple discontinuous road segments among the many counties. The list below describes the sections in each county that are designated SR 780.

== List ==
County	Length (mi)	Length (km)	From	Via	To	Notes
Accomack	0.29	0.47	SR 710 (Davis Road)	Marva Road	US 13 (Lankford Highway)/Maryland state line	
Albemarle	0.47	0.76	SR 631 (Old Lynchburg Road)	Old Lynchburg Road	Charlottesville city limits	
Amherst	0.50	0.80	Dead End	Indian Mission Road	SR 643 (Kenmore Road)	
Augusta	1.01	1.63	SR 781 (Mill Race Road)	Windswept Road	SR 906 (Rifes Ford Road)	
Bedford	0.70	1.13	SR 698 (Creasy Road)	McDearmon Road	SR 606 (Dewey Road)	
Botetourt	0.14	0.23	SR 658 (Laymantown Road)	Sunnydale Court	Dead End	
Carroll	2.30	3.70	US 52 (Main Street)	Howlette Street	US 58 (West Stuart Drive)	
Chesterfield	10.27	16.53	SR 626 (Woodpecker Road)	Unnamed road	Dead End	
Fairfax	0.15	0.24	Dead End	Hamilton Street	SR 650 (Annandale Road)	
Fauquier	1.30	2.09	SR 681 (Cliff Mills Road)	Cabin Branch Road	SR 737 (Conde Road)	
Franklin	2.08	3.35	Dead End	Jamison Mill Road	SR 605 (Henry Road)	
Frederick	0.27	0.43	US 50 (Millwood Pike)	Stanley Drive	Dead End	
Halifax	2.40	3.86	Dead End	Blounts Crossing Trail Lloyds Mill Road	SR 616 (Neals Corner Road)	
Hanover	0.30	0.48	SR 785 (New Britton Road)	New London Road	SR 753 (Patrick Henry Boulevard)	
Henry	1.96	3.15	SR 680 (Columbus Drive)	John Henry Road Out A Way Drive	Dead End	
James City	0.12	0.19	Cul-de-Sac	Midlands Road	SR 616 (Strawberry Plains Road)	
Loudoun	0.30	0.48	SR 631 (New Mountain Road)	Mossridge Road	SR 798 (Bowmantown Road)	
Louisa	0.70	1.13	Dead End	Industrial Drive	SR 22 (Davis Highway)	
Mecklenburg	0.70	1.13	Cul-de-Sac	Theater Road	US 1/US 58 Bus (Danville Street)	
Montgomery	0.10	0.16	Dead End	Sowder Hollow Road	SR 637 (Alleghany Springs Road)	
Pittsylvania	0.20	0.32	Dead End	Royale Drive	SR 626 (Museville Road)	
Pulaski	0.05	0.08	Dead End	McCarthy Road	SR 669 (Cecils Chapel Road)	
Roanoke	1.52	2.45	Roanoke city limits	Cove Road	SR 419 (Electric Road)	
Rockbridge	9.54	15.35	I-64	Scenic Drive Brattons Run Road	SR 39 (Maury River Road)	Gap between segments ending at different points along SR 850 Formerly SR 270
Rockingham	5.70	9.17	SR 613 (Turleytown Road)	Frog Hollow Road Joes Creek Road Shaver Mill Road Lindale Road	SR 753 (Kratzer Road)	Gap between segments ending at different points along SR 752 Gap between segments ending at different points along SR 42
Scott	0.20	0.32	Dead End	Daisy Hollow Road	SR 671 (Twin Springs Road)	
Shenandoah	0.98	1.58	SR 605/SR 763	Water Street	Woodstock town limits	
Spotsylvania	0.76	1.22	SR 608 (Massaponax Church Road)	Corridor Drive	US 1 (Jefferson Davis Highway)	
Stafford	0.14	0.23	SR 779 (Summerwood Drive)	Sunnybrooke Lane	SR 1741 (Puri Lane)	
Tazewell	0.13	0.21	Dead End	Golden Road	SR 730 (Baker Hollow Road)	
Washington	0.40	0.64	Dead End	McCulloch Drive	SR 779 (Hillandale Road)	
Wise	0.70	1.13	Dead End	Thompson Road	SR 646 (Coeburn Mountain Road)	
York	0.38	0.61	SR 706 (Yorktown Road)	Yorkshire Drive	Cul-de-Sac	
