= Virginia State Route 786 =

Secondary route designation

State Route 786

Route information
- Maintained by VDOT

Location
- Country: United States
- State: Virginia

Highway system
- Virginia Routes; Interstate; US; Primary; Secondary; Byways; History; HOT lanes

State Route 786 (SR 786) in the U.S. state of Virginia is a secondary route designation applied to multiple discontinuous road segments among the many counties. The list below describes the sections in each county that are designated SR 786.

== List ==
County	Length (mi)	Length (km)	From	Via	To	Notes
Accomack	1.00	1.61	SR 666 (Fox Grove Road)	Alicato Road	Dead End	
Albemarle	0.45	0.72	SR 637 (Dick Woods Road)	Ivy Depot Road	US 250 (Ivy Road)	
Amherst	0.15	0.24	SR 661 (Stage Road)	Crab Apple Lane	Dead End	
Augusta	2.10	3.38	SR 839 (Eureka Mill Road)	Eakle Road	SR 608 (Long Meadow Road)	
Bedford	1.20	1.93	SR 671 (Timber Ridge Road)	Founding Way Road	SR 715 (Lowry Road)	
Botetourt	0.15	0.24	SR 787 (Daleview Drive)	Mimosa Street	SR 626 (Camelia Drive)	
Campbell	0.80	1.29	SR 605 (Whipping Creek Road)	Beth Lane	Dead End	
Carroll	0.47	0.76	SR 778 (Kelly Road)	Edison Road	SR 702 (Stable Road)	
Chesterfield	0.70	1.13	SR 616 (Chester Road South)	Baldwin Road	Dead End	
Fairfax	0.64	1.03	SR 677 (Old Courthouse Road)	Howard Avenue Boone Boulevard	SR 3402 (Aline Avenue)	
Fauquier	1.70	2.74	SR 658 (Cemetery Road)	OKeefe Road	US 15/SR 661	
Franklin	1.31	2.11	SR 40 (Franklin Street)	Beards Creek Road	SR 605 (Henry Road)	
Frederick	0.22	0.35	SR 785 (Longcroft Road)	Elmwood Road	Dead End	
Halifax	1.20	1.93	SR 649 (Old Concord Road)	Runaway Road	SR 757 (Beales Lane)	
Hanover	0.85	1.37	SR 54 (West Patrick Henry Road)	Country Club Drive	Dead End	
Henry	0.48	0.77	Dead End	Home Creek Road	SR 610 (Axton Road)	
James City	0.07	0.11	Cul-de-Sac	North Court	SR 710 (Colony Point Road)	
Loudoun	0.30	0.48	Dead End	Trinity Church Road	SR 725 (Hughesville Road)	
Louisa	0.27	0.43	SR 621 (Peach Grove Road)	Scott Lane	Cul-de-Sac	
Mecklenburg	0.64	1.03	Dead End	Cedar Bluff Road	SR 608 (Ridge Road)	
Montgomery	0.64	1.03	Dead End	Sterling Drive	SR 652 (McCoy Road)	
Pittsylvania	3.60	5.79	SR 799 (Climax Road)	Snowberry Road	SR 785 (Lark Road)	
Prince William	0.26	0.42	SR 646 (Aden Road)	Unnamed road	Cul-de-Sac	
Pulaski	0.35	0.56	Dead End	Hogans Place	SR 710 (Mount Olivet Road)	
Roanoke	1.72	2.77	SR 612 (Poor Mountain Road)	Willett Lane	SR 612 (Poor Mountain Road)	
Rockbridge	0.57	0.92	Dead End	Stagecoach Lane	SR 671 (Old Farm Road)	
Rockingham	2.70	4.35	SR 880 (John Kline Road)	Cedar Run Lane	SR 617 (Sunset Road)	Gap between segments ending at different points along SR 752
Scott	0.70	1.13	SR 613 (Big Moccasin Road)	Whitetail Circle	SR 613 (Big Moccasin Road)	
Shenandoah	0.16	0.26	SR 55/SR 622	Lineburg Lane	SR 55 (John Marshall Highway)	
Tazewell	0.55	0.89	Dead End	Ravens Nest Branch Road Rocky Hollow Road	SR 626 (Ravens Nest Branch Road)	
Washington	0.40	0.64	Dead End	Pocahontas Trail	SR 735 (Ramblewood Drive)	
Wise	0.41	0.66	SR 634 (Bean Gap Road)	Collins Baker Road	Dead End	
York	1.00	1.61	FR-137 (Rochambeau Drive)	Oaktree Road	FR 137 (Rochambeau Drive)	
