= Virginia State Route 755 =

Secondary route designation

State Route 755

Route information
- Maintained by VDOT

Location
- Country: United States
- State: Virginia

Highway system
- Virginia Routes; Interstate; US; Primary; Secondary; Byways; History; HOT lanes

State Route 755 (SR 755) in the U.S. state of Virginia is a secondary route designation applied to multiple discontinuous road segments among the many counties. The list below describes the sections in each county that are designated SR 755.

== List ==
County	Length (mi)	Length (km)	From	Via	To	Notes
Accomack	0.28	0.45	SR 176 (Parksley Road)	Seymore Lane	Dead End	
Albemarle	0.22	0.35	SR 6 (Irish Road)	Secretarys Sand Road	SR 717 (Secretarys Sand Road/Old Sand Road)	
Amherst	1.40	2.25	SR 634 (Coffey Town Road)	Wiggs Spring Road	Dead End	
Augusta	0.40	0.64	SR 730 (North River Road)	Vance Road	Rockingham County line	
Bedford	15.34	24.69	SR 757 (Goodview Road)	Morgans Mill Road Nemmo Road Simmons Mill Road Union Church Road	SR 684 (Rocky Ford Road)	Gap between segments ending at different points along SR 24 Gap between segments ending at different points along SR 616
Botetourt	0.13	0.21	Dead End	Rader Road	SR 670 (Trinity Road)	
Campbell	0.60	0.97	Dead End	Ball Park Road	SR 600 (Sugar Hill Road)	
Carroll	2.20	3.54	SR 611 (Deepwater Road)	Deer Trail Road Piney Forks Road	SR 756 (Goad Drive)	Gap between segments ending at different points along SR 757
Chesterfield	1.65	2.66	SR 955 (Arboretum Parkway)	Arboretum Place Pinetta Drive	SR 678 (Buford Road)	
Dinwiddie	0.50	0.80	Dead End	Slates Road	SR 751 (Cox Road)	
Fairfax	0.50	0.80	SR 603 (Beach Mill Road)	Springvale Road	Dead End	
Fauquier	0.82	1.32	SR 651 (Sumerduck Road)	Grassdale Road	Dead End	
Franklin	0.55	0.89	SR 619 (Fanny Cook Road)	Clark Road	US 220 (Virgil H Goode Highway)	
Frederick	0.11	0.18	SR 654 (Cedar Grove Road)	Unnamed road	Dead End	
Halifax	0.20	0.32	SR 643 (MeKendree Church Road)	Bradley Road	US 501 (L P Bailey Memorial Highway)	
Hanover	0.50	0.80	Dead End	Johnson Town Road	SR 657 (Ashcake Road)	
Henry	0.30	0.48	SR 57 (Fairystone Park Highway)	Woody Circle	SR 57 (Fairystone Park Highway)	
James City	0.64	1.03	FR-137 (Cloverleaf Lane)	Rochambeau Drive	SR 30/SR 607 (Croaker Road)	
Loudoun	0.30	0.48	SR 698 (Waterford Road)	Nestlewood Road	Dead End	
Louisa	0.75	1.21	Dead End	New Anna Road	US 522 (Cross County Road)	
Mecklenburg	0.90	1.45	SR 47	Radio Road	SR 652 (Callis Road)	
Montgomery	0.10	0.16	Dead End	Persimmon Road	SR 637 (Alleghany Springs Road)	
Pittsylvania	1.60	2.57	SR 642 (Marina Drive)	Mercury Road	SR 665 (Rockford School Road)	
Prince William	0.17	0.27	SR 3635 (Crossman Creek Way)	Ashleys Park Lane	SR 621 (Devlin Road)	
Pulaski	0.70	1.13	Dead End	Depot Road	Dead End	
Roanoke	0.76	1.22	FR-70 (Skyview Road)	Skyview Road	End Loop	
Rockbridge	0.80	1.29	SR 627 (Sycamore Valley Drive)	Dug Row Road	SR 626 (Hackers Road)	
Rockingham	3.86	6.21	Augusta County line	Vance Road Windy Cove Road Lambert Town Road	SR 257 (Briery Branch Road)	Gap between segments ending at different points along SR 750
Scott	1.80	2.90	SR 72 (Hanging Rock Parkway)	Flatwoods Road Unnamed road Greear Lane	Russell County line	Gap between segments ending at different points along the Wise County line
Shenandoah	0.15	0.24	Dead End	Williams Lane	SR 55 (John Marshall Highway)	
Stafford	1.25	2.01	SR 612 (Hartwood Road)	Jesse Curtis Lane	Dead End	Gap between dead ends
Tazewell	0.20	0.32	SR 676 (Back Hollow Road)	Apostolic Drive	Dead End	
Washington	0.68	1.09	US 58 (Jeb Stuart Highway)	Rhymer Road	SR 603 (Kannarock Road)	
Wise	1.20	1.93	Scott County line	Flatwoods Road Unnamed road	SR 672	Gap between the Scott County line and a dead end
York	0.14	0.23	SR 754 (Shamrock Avenue)	Trinity Drive	SR 796 (Oak Street)	
