= Virginia State Route 781 =

Secondary route designation

State Route 781

Route information
- Maintained by VDOT

Location
- Country: United States
- State: Virginia

Highway system
- Virginia Routes; Interstate; US; Primary; Secondary; Byways; History; HOT lanes

State Route 781 (SR 781) in the U.S. state of Virginia is a secondary route designation applied to multiple discontinuous road segments among the many counties. The list below describes the sections in each county that are designated SR 781.

== List ==
County	Length (mi)	Length (km)	From	Via	To	Notes
Accomack	1.30	2.09	SR 679 (Atlantic Road)	Taylor Farm Road	Dead End	
Albemarle	1.05	1.69	SR 875 (Country Green Road)	Sunset Avenue Extension	Charlottesville city limits	
Amherst	0.50	0.80	Dead End	Cash Town Road	SR 629 (Little Piney Road)	
Augusta	5.78	9.30	Dead End	Mill Race Road Bald Rock Road	SR 744 (Lea Port Road)	
Bedford	1.40	2.25	SR 644 (Coffee Road)	Tabernacle Lane	SR 621 (Cottontown Road)	
Botetourt	0.12	0.19	SR 658 (Laymantown Road)	Westwood Court	Dead End	
Campbell	1.30	2.09	Dead End	Mortimer Drive	SR 24 (Colonial Highway)	
Carroll	1.43	2.30	SR 713 (Elkhorn Road)	Locust Ridge Road	SR 620 (Crooked Creek Road)	
Chesterfield	0.30	0.48	Dead End	Granite Spring Road	US 60 (Midlothian Turnpike)	
Fairfax	1.17	1.88	SR 1260 (Maury Place)	Central Avenue Martha Street Martha Washington Street	SR 3122 (Augustine Street)	Gap between segments ending at different points along US 1
Fauquier	0.20	0.32	SR 705 (Burrland Lane)	Rock Hill Road	SR 702 (Rock Hill Mill Road)	
Franklin	4.00	6.44	SR 40/SR 752	Pernello Road Ramblin Rose Road	SR 865 (Timberline Road)	Gap between segments ending at different points along SR 623
Frederick	0.76	1.22	SR 1538	Prince Frederick Drive	SR 780 (Stanley Drive)	
Halifax	1.75	2.82	Dead End	Deer View Trail	SR 678 (Grubby Road)	
Hanover	1.00	1.61	SR 715 (Beaver Dam Road)	Connie Hall Road	SR 674 (Woodman Hall Road)	
Henry	5.67	9.12	SR 688 (Lee Ford Camp Road)	Chestnut Knob Road	Dead End	
Loudoun	0.37	0.60	SR 9 (Charles Town Pike)	Catoctin Ridge Road	SR 9 (Charles Town Pike)	
Louisa	0.11	0.18	Cul-de-Sac	Rescue Lane	SR 780 (Industrial Drive)	
Mecklenburg	1.00	1.61	SR 728 (Union Chapel Road)	One Mike Road	SR 49	
Montgomery	2.04	3.28	SR 655 (Long Shop Road/Mount Zion Road)	Lick Run Road	SR 708 (Norris Run Road)	
Pittsylvania	1.50	2.41	SR 626 (Museville Road)	Rockcreek Road	SR 40 (Gretna Road)	
Prince William	0.58	0.93	Dead End	Cushing Road	SR 621 (Balls Ford Road)	
Pulaski	0.18	0.29	Dead End	Scott Road	SR 693 (Julia Simpkins Road)	
Roanoke	1.02	1.64	Dead End	Crumpacker Drive	US 220 Alt (Cloverdale Road)	Gap between SR 1220 and SR 1226
Rockbridge	6.15	9.90	SR 759 (Arnolds Valley Road)	Unnamed road Petites Gap Road	Dead End	
Rockingham	2.20	3.54	SR 613 (Turkeytown Road)	Wills Creek Road	SR 752 (Wengers Mill Road/Mount Zion Road)	
Scott	0.19	0.31	SR 665 (Moccasin Street)	Poplar Street	SR 767 (Woodland Street)	
Shenandoah	0.20	0.32	SR 654 (Zion Church Road)	County Farm Lane	Dead End	
Stafford	0.22	0.35	Cul-de-Sac	Ballantrae Court	Cul-de-Sac	
Tazewell	0.80	1.29	US 19	Industry Road	US 19	
Washington	1.50	2.41	Bristol city limits	Tranbarger Road	SR 655 (Oak Grove Road)	
Wise	1.68	2.70	US 23	Hamner Hollow Road	SR 614	
York	0.22	0.35	SR 780 (Yorkshire Drive)	Brook Run	SR 706 (Yorktown Road)	
