= Virginia State Route 788 =

Secondary route designation

State Route 788

Route information
- Maintained by VDOT

Location
- Country: United States
- State: Virginia

Highway system
- Virginia Routes; Interstate; US; Primary; Secondary; Byways; History; HOT lanes

State Route 788 (SR 788) in the U.S. state of Virginia is a secondary route designation applied to multiple discontinuous road segments among the many counties. The list below describes the sections in each county that are designated SR 788.

== List ==
County	Length (mi)	Length (km)	From	Via	To	Notes
Accomack	1.00	1.61	Dead End	Hammock Road	SR 695 (Saxis Road)	
Albemarle	0.97	1.56	SR 684 (Lanetown Road)	Railroad Avenue	US 250 (Three Notchd Road)	
Amherst	0.16	0.26	SR 728 (Eastview Drive)	Garten Place	Dead End	
Augusta	1.99	3.20	SR 612 (Laurel Hill Road)	Old Laurel Hill Road Moses Lane Niswander Road	SR 786 (Eakle Road)	Gap between segments ending at different points along SR 612 Gap between dead ends
Bedford	0.50	0.80	SR 634 (Hardy Road)	Calvert Road	Dead End	
Botetourt	1.20	1.93	Dead End	Old Sessler Mill Road	SR 665 (Country Club Road)	
Campbell	0.80	1.29	SR 663 (Bethany Road)	Hardwood Trail	Dead End	
Carroll	1.28	2.06	North Carolina state line	McCraw Road	SR 620 (Lambsburg Road)	
Chesterfield	0.45	0.72	SR 145 (Centralia Road)	Telstar Drive	SR 1905 (Old Warson Drive)	
Fairfax	0.52	0.84	Cul-de-Sac	Penderwood Drive	SR 664 (Waples Mill Road)	
Fauquier	0.24	0.39	Dead End	Tall Cedars Road	SR 637 (Courtneys Corner Road)	
Franklin	9.63	15.50	SR 623 (Fairy Stone Park Road)	Thompson Ridge Road Dry Hill Road Buffalo Ridge Road	SR 748 (Turners Creek Road)	Gap between segments ending at different points along SR 40
Frederick	0.28	0.45	SR 896 (Crossover Boulevard)	Crossover Boulevard	Winchester city limits	
Halifax	0.40	0.64	Dead End	Saint Mark Church Road	SR 711 (Alton Post Office Road)	
Hanover	0.45	0.72	SR 641 (Cross Corner Road)	Atkinson Road	Dead End	
Henry	0.42	0.68	US 58 Bus	Riverview Court	Cul-de-Sac	
Loudoun	0.25	0.40	Dead End	Hall Road	Dead End	
Louisa	0.19	0.31	SR 787 (Alma Road)	Plateau Road	Cul-de-Sac	
Mecklenburg	0.90	1.45	Dead End	Clary Lane	SR 619 (Nellie Jones Road)	
Montgomery	0.15	0.24	Cul-de-Sac	Ivy Lane	SR 693 (Childress Road)	
Pittsylvania	1.50	2.41	SR 794 (Old Mine Road)	Luster Road	SR 40 (Gretna Road)	
Prince William	1.09	1.75	SR 234 (Dumfries Road)	Interstate Drive	Dead End	
Pulaski	0.90	1.45	Dead End	Jennings Road	SR 644 (Hurston Road)	
Roanoke	0.40	0.64	Dead End	Greenhouse Road	SR 612 (Slings Gap Road)	
Rockbridge	0.40	0.64	SR 763 (Lincoln Road)	Warm Run Road	Dead End	
Rockingham	0.25	0.40	SR 708 (Lynnwood Road)	Flank Circle	SR 708 (Lynnwood Road)	
Scott	0.40	0.64	SR 870 (Daniel Boone Trail)	Marble Point Circle	SR 870 (Daniel Boone Trail)	
Shenandoah	0.40	0.64	Dead End	Lineburg Lane	SR 648 (Sandy Hook Road)	
Stafford	0.37	0.60	SR 644 (Rock Hill Church Road)	Forrest Hill Lane	Dead End	
Tazewell	0.22	0.35	SR 61 (Clearfork Road)	Olympic Drive	Dead End	
Washington	2.25	3.62	SR 718 (Vails Mill Road)	Cornett Road McCann Road	SR 91	
Wise	0.35	0.56	Dead End	Big Branch Road	SR 671 (South Fork Road)	
York	0.35	0.56	Dead End	Lakeview Drive Wildwood Drive	Dead End	
