= Virginia State Route 733 =

Secondary route designation

State Route 733

Route information
- Maintained by VDOT

Location
- Country: United States
- State: Virginia

Highway system
- Virginia Routes; Interstate; US; Primary; Secondary; Byways; History; HOT lanes

State Route 733 (SR 733) in the U.S. state of Virginia is a secondary route designation applied to multiple discontinuous road segments among the many counties. The list below describes the sections in each county that are designated SR 733.

== List ==
County	Length (mi)	Length (km)	From	Via	To	Notes
Accomack	0.40	0.64	Dead End	Tilghman Road	SR 641 (Broadway Road)	
Albemarle	0.20	0.32	Dead End	Campbell Farm Lane	SR 729 (Buck Island Road)	
Amherst	1.30	2.09	Dead End	Windy Ridge Way	SR 658 (Grandmas Hill Road)	
Augusta	3.60	5.79	SR 736 (Union Church Road)	Moffet Branch Road	SR 739 (Curry Road)	
Bedford	2.30	3.70	Dead End	Chellis Ford Road	SR 630 (Carters Mill Road)	
Campbell	0.70	1.13	SR 712 (Dearing Ford Road)	Leewood Road	Dead End	
Carroll	4.28	6.89	SR 707 (Mount Zion Road)	Mill Hill Road Backwoods Road	SR 635 (Pot Rock Road)	
Chesterfield	2.28	3.67	US 360 (Hull Street)	Pocoshock Boulevard Ruthers Road	US 60 (Midlothian Turnpike)	
Dinwiddie	1.20	1.93	SR 670 (Old Stage Road)	Little Zion Road	SR 703 (Carson Road)	
Fairfax	0.40	0.64	SR 710 (Wakefield Chapel Road)	Glen Park Road	SR 620 (Braddock Road)	
Fauquier	1.40	2.25	SR 647 (Crest Hill Road)	Wilson Road John Barton Payne Road	SR 732 (Tanner Branch Road/John Barton Payne Road)	
Franklin	1.05	1.69	SR 731 (Dugwell Road)	Nursery Road	SR 735 (Retreat Road)	
Frederick	2.70	4.35	SR 707 (Hollow Road)	Fletcher Road Fairview Road	Dead End	
Halifax	4.70	7.56	SR 604 (Rip Rap Road)	East Hitesburg Road West Hitesburg Road	SR 737 (Hudson Road)	Gap between segments ending at different points along SR 734
Hanover	1.80	2.90	SR 680 (Shiloh Church Road)	Rocky Ford Road	SR 715 (Beaver Dam Road)	
Henry	0.38	0.61	Dead End	Country Road	SR 672 (Bassett Heights Road Extension)	
James City	0.15	0.24	Dead End	Chanco Road	SR 629 (Hickory Signpost Road)	
Loudoun	9.75	15.69	SR 611 (Saint Louis Road)	Turkey Roost Road Beverdam Bridge Road Leith Lane Mountville Road Lime Kiln Road	US 15 (James Monroe Highway)	Gap between segments ending at different points along SR 734
Louisa	0.45	0.72	Dead End	Kents Mill Road	SR 623 (Chopping Road)	
Mecklenburg	1.82	2.93	SR 735 (White House Road)	M T Hayes Road	SR 734 (Cherry Hill Road)	
Montgomery	0.60	0.97	Dead End	Huff Lane	SR 657 (Merrimac Road)	
Pittsylvania	1.80	2.90	SR 734 (Ringgold Road)	Barker Road	SR 726 (Ringgold Church Road)	
Prince William	0.37	0.60	SR 638 (Colchester Road)	Woodside Drive	Dead End	
Pulaski	1.00	1.61	SR 100	Lillydell Circle	Dead End	
Roanoke	0.90	1.45	SR 619 (Wildwood Road)	Richland Hills Drive	Dead End	
Rockbridge	1.00	1.61	SR 631 (Old Buena Vista Road)	Jordan Road	Dead End	
Rockingham	1.00	1.61	SR 734 (Bank Church Road)	Dale Enterprise Road	US 33 (Rawley Pike)	
Scott	0.34	0.55	SR 614 (A P Carter Highway)	Country Shire Circle	SR 614 (A P Carter Highway)	
Shenandoah	0.70	1.13	SR 728	Limestone Road	SR 42 (Senedo Road)	
Spotsylvania	0.68	1.09	SR 208 (Courthouse Road)	Brockenburg Road	SR 208 (Courthouse Road)	
Stafford	0.60	0.97	SR 628 (Winding Creek Road)	Embrey Mill Road	Dead End	
Tazewell	0.17	0.27	SR 831 (Whitney Branch Road)	Unnamed road	Dead End	
Washington	2.25	3.62	SR 714 (South Fork River Road)	Rush Creek Road	SR 605 (Widener Valley Road)	
Wise	0.05	0.08	SR 713 (Riverside Drive)	Hickory Street	Dead End	
York	0.03	0.05	SR 708 (Basta Drive)	Janis Drive	SR 707 (Janis Drive)	
