= Virginia State Route 760 =

Secondary route designation

State Route 760

Route information
- Maintained by VDOT

Location
- Country: United States
- State: Virginia

Highway system
- Virginia Routes; Interstate; US; Primary; Secondary; Byways; History; HOT lanes

State Route 760 (SR 760) in the U.S. state of Virginia is a secondary route designation applied to multiple discontinuous road segments among the many counties. The list below describes the sections in each county that are designated SR 760.

== List ==
County	Length (mi)	Length (km)	From	Via	To	Notes
Accomack	0.15	0.24	SR 175 (Chincoteague Road)	Unnamed road	Dead End	
Albemarle	1.53	2.46	SR 712 (Garden Lane)	Red Hill School Road	US 29 (Monacan Trail)	
Amherst	1.00	1.61	SR 151 (Patrick Henry Highway)	Alcock Road	Dead End	
Augusta	3.50	5.63	SR 42 (Scenic Highway)	Bunker Hill Road	SR 747 (Freemason Run Road)	
Bedford	1.50	2.41	SR 634 (Hardy Road)	Bandy Mill Road	Dead End	
Botetourt	0.90	1.45	Dead End	Deerfield Road	SR 665 (Country Club Road)	
Campbell	0.11	0.18	SR 797 (County Airport Road)	Runway Road	Dead End	
Carroll	1.20	1.93	SR 764 (Panther Creek Road)	Flatwood Road	SR 757 (Duncan Mill Road)	
Chesterfield	0.92	1.48	SR 626 (Woodpecker Road)	Elko Road	Dead End	
Dinwiddie	0.37	0.60	SR 623 (Station Road)	Sutherland Avenue	Dead End	
Fairfax	1.91	3.07	SR 694 (Lewinsville Road)	Brook Road Rector Lane	SR 738 (Dominion Drive)	
Fauquier	0.02	0.03	Dead End	Railstop Road	SR 757	
Franklin	0.70	1.13	SR 605 (Henry Road)	Telegraph Road	SR 761 (Canton Church Road)	
Frederick	0.08	0.13	US 522 (Front Royal Pike)	Fries Loop Road	Dead End	
Halifax	0.50	0.80	SR 360 (Bethel Road)	Ferry Trail	Dead End	
Hanover	0.25	0.40	Dead End	Trainham Road	SR 715 (Beaver Dam Road)	
Henry	0.80	1.29	SR 648 (Stoney Mountain Road)	Price Harrison Lane	Dead End	
James City	0.28	0.45	Dead End	Rose Lane Unnamed road	SR 607 (Croaker Road)	
Loudoun	0.36	0.58	SR 734 (Snickersville Turnpike)	Clayton Hall Road	SR 7 (Harry F Byrd Highway)	Formerly SR 245
Louisa	0.35	0.56	SR 621 (Peach Grove Road)	Jones Road	Dead End	
Mecklenburg	1.30	2.09	SR 660 (Old Cox Road)	Phillips Lane	Lunenburg County line	
Montgomery	0.31	0.50	SR 661 (Dominion Drive/Chrisman Mill Road)	Dominion Drive	SR 114 (Peppers Ferry Boulevard)	
Pittsylvania	7.24	11.65	US 29 Bus	Music Street	SR 609 (Brights Road)	
Prince William	2.05	3.30	Boundary Avenue	Rugby Road	SR 769 (Lake Drive)	Gap between the Manassas city limits and the Manassas Park city limits Gap between segments ending at different points along SR 28
Pulaski	0.10	0.16	Dead End	Divers Road	SR 624 (New River Road)	
Roanoke	0.19	0.31	SR 639 (West Riverside Drive/Harborwood Road)	Divguids Lane	Salem city limits	
Rockbridge	2.10	3.38	Dead End	Golf Course Road	US 11 (Lee Highway)	
Rockingham	1.50	2.41	SR 613 (Whitmore Shop Road)	Clusters Road	SR 726 (Mount Clinton Pike)	
Scott	2.00	3.22	SR 662	Unnamed road	SR 619	
Shenandoah	0.98	1.58	US 11 (Main Street)	Water Street	Dead End	
Spotsylvania	0.53	0.85	SR 3 (Plank Road)	Willow Oaks Drive Corter Avenue	SR 1758 (Middleton Drive)	
Stafford	0.56	0.90	SR 624 (Morton Road/Layhill Road)	Forbes Street	Cul-de-Sac	
Tazewell	0.16	0.26	Dead End	Monk Road	SR 641 (Grassy Spur Road)	
Washington	0.20	0.32	SR 750 (Old Mill Road)	Magnolia Drive	SR 750 (Old Mill Road)	
Wise	0.12	0.19	SR 757 (Norton Coeburn Road)	Unnamed road	SR 757 (Norton Coeburn Road)	
York	0.11	0.18	SR 759 (Cherry Point Drive)	Woodhaven Drive	Dead End	
