= Virginia State Route 765 =

Secondary route designation

State Route 765

Route information
- Maintained by VDOT

Location
- Country: United States
- State: Virginia

Highway system
- Virginia Routes; Interstate; US; Primary; Secondary; Byways; History; HOT lanes

State Route 765 (SR 765) in the U.S. state of Virginia is a secondary route designation applied to multiple discontinuous road segments among the many counties. The list below describes the sections in each county that are designated SR 765.

== List ==
County	Length (mi)	Length (km)	From	Via	To	Notes
Accomack	0.10	0.16	Dead End	Dogwood Lane	SR 798 (Atlantic Road)	
Albemarle	0.70	1.13	Dead End	Walnut Level Road	SR 668 (Batton Road)	
Amherst	0.60	0.97	Dead End	Turner Creek Road	SR 608 (Toytown Road)	
Augusta	1.20	1.93	Dead End	Cupp Lane Narrow Back Road	SR 764 (Timber Ridge Road)	Gap between segments ending at different points along SR 731
Bedford	2.00	3.22	Dead End	Overstreet Creek Road	SR 640 (Wheats Valley Road)	
Botetourt	0.20	0.32	Dead End	Derek Drive	SR 605 (Sanderson Drive)	
Carroll	4.39	7.07	SR 761 (Lindsey Mill Road)	Sutphintown Road	SR 764 (Panther Creek Road)	
Chesterfield	0.35	0.56	Dead End	Hill Road	SR 742 (Canasta Drive)	
Fairfax	0.34	0.55	SR 236 (Little River Turnpike)	Woodland Road	Dead End	
Fauquier	1.00	1.61	SR 647 (Crest Hill Road)	Townsend Road	SR 733 (Wilson Road)	
Franklin	0.20	0.32	SR 605 (Henry Road)	Alumine Road	Dead End	
Frederick	0.23	0.37	Dead End	Splash Avenue	SR 726 (Lakeview Circle)	
Halifax	2.19	3.52	Dead End	Clinton Road	SR 603 (Cody Road)	
Hanover	0.45	0.72	Dead End	Overhill Drive	US 33 (Mountain Road)	
Henry	0.06	0.10	SR 764 (Frank Wilson Avenue)	Curwen Place	Dead End	
James City	0.04	0.06	SR 639 (Llewellyn Drive)	Dickson Circle	Cul-de-Sac	
Loudoun	2.40	3.86	SR 619 (Trappe Road)	Ridgeside Road	SR 626 (Foggy Bottom Road)	
Louisa	0.15	0.24	Dead End	Alex Drive	SR 208 (Courthouse Road)	
Mecklenburg	0.60	0.97	Dead End	Peter Walker Road	SR 624 (Morris Town Circle)	
Montgomery	0.39	0.63	Dead End	Lantern Road	SR 665 (Bains Chapel Road)	
Pittsylvania	2.70	4.35	SR 790 (Piney Road)	Sandy Road	SR 672 (Pittsville Road)	
Prince William	0.11	0.18	Dead End	Pinewood Court	SR 638 (Colchester Road)	
Pulaski	0.12	0.19	SR 1206 (Page Lane)	Walnut Lane	SR 749 (Pine Street)	
Roanoke	0.25	0.40	Dead End	Janne Drive	SR 311 (Catawba Valley Drive)	
Rockbridge	0.02	0.03	Dead End	Swink Lane	SR 612 (Blue Grass Trail)	
Rockingham	8.15	13.12	SR 701 (Reed Road/Mount Clinton Pike)	Mount Clinton Pike Amberly Road Cromer Road Buttermilk Creek Road Gravels Road	US 11 (Valley Pike)	Gap between segments ending at different points along SR 910 Gap between segments ending at different points along SR 42
Scott	0.05	0.08	SR 763 (Park Street)	Queen Avenue Cypress Street	SR 764 (Cypress Street)	
Shenandoah	0.76	1.22	SR 698 (Palmyra Church Road)	Grandstaff Lane	Dead End	
Spotsylvania	0.47	0.76	Dead End	Crossroads Parkway	US 17 Bus (Mills Drive)	
Tazewell	0.08	0.13	SR 637 (Cochran Hollow Road)	Taylors Mill Road	Dead End	
Washington	1.00	1.61	Dead End	Canebrake Road	SR 692 (Toole Creek Road)	
Wise	0.30	0.48	SR 68	Ash Street	Dead End	
York	0.23	0.37	FR-670 (Cardinal Lane)	Crandol Drive	SR 764 (Mill Road)	
