= Virginia State Route 758 =

Secondary route designation

State Route 758

Route information
- Maintained by VDOT

Location
- Country: United States
- State: Virginia

Highway system
- Virginia Routes; Interstate; US; Primary; Secondary; Byways; History; HOT lanes

State Route 758 (SR 758) in the U.S. state of Virginia is a secondary route designation applied to multiple discontinuous road segments among the many counties. The list below describes the sections in each county that are designated SR 758.

== List ==
County	Length (mi)	Length (km)	From	Via	To	Notes
Accomack	0.65	1.05	SR 687 (Bethel Church Road)	Brown Lane	Dead End	
Albemarle	1.25	2.01	Dead End	Smith Road	SR 637 (Dick Woods Road)	
Amherst	0.30	0.48	Dead End	Althea Lane	SR 627 (Dug Hill Road)	
Augusta	5.20	8.37	SR 42 (Scenic Highway)	George Waltons Road Lick Run Road	SR 764 (Old Mountain Road/Bear Trap Farm Road)	Gap between segments ending at different points along SR 756 Gap between segments ending at different points along SR 730
Bedford	2.81	4.52	Dead End	Thomasson Mill Road	SR 757 (Goodview Road)	
Botetourt	0.05	0.08	Dead End	Bridge Street	SR 633 (Wood Town Road)	
Carroll	1.45	2.33	Grayson County line	Hilltown Road	SR 94 (Ivanhoe Road)	
Chesterfield	0.14	0.23	SR 651 (Belmont Road)	Unnamed road	Dead End	
Dinwiddie	0.39	0.63	Dead End	Steers Road	SR 613 (Dabney Mill Road)	
Fairfax	0.15	0.24	SR 650 (Annandale Road)	Maple Place	SR 244 (Columbia Pike)	
Fauquier	1.30	2.09	SR 617 (Blackwells Mill Road)	Deep Run Mill Road	SR 634 (Elk Run Church Road/Goldmine Road)	
Franklin	0.90	1.45	SR 684 (Boones Mill Road)	Crooked Run Road	SR 684 (Boones Mill Road)	
Frederick	0.95	1.53	Dead End	Belle View Lane	SR 627 (Chapel Road)	
Halifax	0.50	0.80	Dead End	Crossroads Trail	SR 623 (Mortons Ferry Road)	
Hanover	0.42	0.68	Dead End	Holly Road	SR 643 (New Ashcake Road)	
Henry	0.60	0.97	SR 692 (Horsepasture Price Road)	Donnybrook Road	Dead End	
James City	0.48	0.77	Dead End	Maxton Lane	SR 607 (Croaker Road)	
Loudoun	1.60	2.57	SR 852 (Georges Mill Road)	Stevens Road	SR 852 (Georges Mill Road)	
Louisa	0.85	1.37	Dead End	White Walnut Road	SR 605 (Shannon Hill Road)	
Mecklenburg	1.00	1.61	SR 47	Quarter Road	Dead End	
Montgomery	0.25	0.40	Christiansburg town limits	Houchins Road	Dead End	
Pittsylvania	2.50	4.02	SR 768 (Summerset Road)	Rose Street	SR 768 (Summerset Road)	
Prince William	0.63	1.01	SR 643 (Purcell Road)	Cornwell Drive	Dead End	
Pulaski	0.37	0.60	Dead End	Case Knife Road	SR 610 (Case Knife Ridge Road)	
Roanoke	1.12	1.80	Roanoke city limits/Belle Avenue	Carson Road	US 460 (Challenger Avenue)	
Rockbridge	0.70	1.13	Dead End	Oak Tree Lane	SR 251	
Rockingham	2.50	4.02	SR 620 (Mountain Valley Road)	Happy Valley Road Rainbow Trail	SR 620 (Mountain Valley Road)	
Scott	0.20	0.32	US 58 (Bristol Highway)	McNamara Circle	US 58 (Bristol Highway)	
Shenandoah	12.05	19.39	Woodstock town limits	Cemetery Road	SR 678 (Fort Valley Road)	
Spotsylvania	0.20	0.32	SR 635 (Lee Hill School Drive)	Lee Hill Park Road	Dead End	
Stafford	0.23	0.37	SR 611 (Widewater Road)	Rectory Lane	SR 611 (Widewater Road)	
Tazewell	2.34	3.77	SR 644 (Abbs Valley Road)	Franklin Road	West Virginia state line	
Washington	0.40	0.64	Dead End	Chadwick Road	SR 605 (Widener Valley Road)	
Wise	0.52	0.84	SR 757 (Norton Coeburn Road)	Unnamed road	Dead End	
York	0.18	0.29	SR 661 (Piney Point Road)	Cedar Point Crescent	Dead End	
