= Virginia State Route 736 =

Secondary route designation

State Route 736

Route information
- Maintained by VDOT

Location
- Country: United States
- State: Virginia

Highway system
- Virginia Routes; Interstate; US; Primary; Secondary; Byways; History; HOT lanes

State Route 736 (SR 736) in the U.S. state of Virginia is a secondary route designation applied to multiple discontinuous road segments among the many counties. The list below describes the sections in each county that are designated SR 736.

== List ==
| County | Length (mi) | Length (km) | From | Via | To | Notes |
|---|---|---|---|---|---|---|
| Accomack | 0.80 | 1.29 | SR 600 (Seaside Road) | Bradford Road | SR 180 (Wachapreague Road) | |
| Albemarle | 3.15 | 5.07 | SR 635 (Craig Store Road) | Whites Mountain Road Pughs Store Road | Dead End | Gap between segments ending at different points along SR 636 |
| Amherst | 2.40 | 3.86 | Dead End | Winton Road | SR 151 (Patrick Henry Highway) | |
| Augusta | 7.96 | 12.81 | US 250 (Hankey Mountain Highway) | Jennings Gap Road Union Church Road Plum Tree Draft Road Union Church Road | SR 732 (Middle River Road) | Gap between segments ending at different points along SR 42 Gap between segments ending at different points along SR 734 |
| Bedford | 2.80 | 4.51 | Dead End | Mob Creek Road Home Place Road | Dead End | |
| Botetourt | 0.55 | 0.89 | Dead End | Alleghany Avenue | Alleghany County line | |
| Campbell | 1.15 | 1.85 | Dead End | Liberty Lake Road | SR 615 (Red House Road) | |
| Carroll | 3.30 | 5.31 | Dead End | River Hill Road | SR 635 (Pot Rock Road/Hebron Road) | |
| Chesterfield | 0.60 | 0.97 | Dead End | Summit Road | SR 655 (Beach Road) | |
| Dinwiddie | 0.50 | 0.80 | SR 659 (Bain Road/Jones Road) | Barnes Road | Dead End | |
| Fauquier | 1.30 | 2.09 | Dead End | Thumb Run Road | SR 688 (Leeds Manor Road) | |
| Franklin | 2.70 | 4.35 | SR 756 (Old Forge Road) | Madcap Road | SR 737 (Deyerle Knob Road) | |
| Frederick | 0.15 | 0.24 | Dead End | Rossum Lane | SR 657 (Senseny Road) | |
| Halifax | 2.20 | 3.54 | SR 737 (Hudson Road) | Bowen Road | SR 734 (Red Bank Road) | |
| Hanover | 1.25 | 2.01 | Dead End | Dunn Road | US 33 (Mountain Road) | |
| Henry | 0.33 | 0.53 | Dead End | Lewis Road | SR 654 (Ravesn Croft Road) | |
| James City | 0.21 | 0.34 | SR 603 (Diascund Res Road) | Berkely Town Road | Dead End | |
| Loudoun | 1.80 | 2.90 | SR 626 (Bloomfield Road) | Furr Road | SR 719 (Airmont Road) | |
| Louisa | 0.30 | 0.48 | Dead End | Thurston Road | SR 613 (Oakland Road) | |
| Mecklenburg | 2.90 | 4.67 | SR 735 (White House Road) | Overbey Road | SR 602 (Whitehouse Road) | |
| Montgomery | 0.14 | 0.23 | SR 652 (McCoy Road) | Tucker Road | SR 685 (Prices Fork Road) | |
| Prince George | 0.26 | 0.42 | SR 645 (Puddledock Road) | Advantage Drive | SR 735 | |
| Prince William | 0.24 | 0.39 | SR 735 (Walnut Street) | Pratt Street | Cul-de-Sac | |
| Pulaski | 0.80 | 1.29 | SR 693 (Julia Simpkins Road) | Irish Mountain Road | Dead End | |
| Roanoke | 0.50 | 0.80 | Dead End | Mowles Road | SR 694 (Twelve OClock Knob Road) | |
| Rockbridge | 0.70 | 1.13 | Dead End | Terrell Drive | SR 602 (Turkey Hill Road) | |
| Rockingham | 2.90 | 4.67 | Dead End | Wheelbarger Road Rushville Road Swope Road | SR 701 (Silver Lake Road) | |
| Scott | 0.19 | 0.31 | Dead End | Broad Street | Dead End | |
| Shenandoah | 2.50 | 4.02 | SR 617 (River Road) | Jiggady Road | SR 617 (River Road) | |
| Spotsylvania | 0.41 | 0.66 | US 17/SR 608 | Eagle Drive | Dead End | |
| Stafford | 0.05 | 0.08 | SR 706 (Marsh Road) | Marsh Road | US 17 (Warrenton Road) | |
| Tazewell | 0.70 | 1.13 | Dead End | Turner Hollow Road | SR 660 (Loop Road) | |
| Washington | 10.58 | 17.03 | SR 762 (Loves Mill Road) | Golden Glow Drive Kelly Chapel Road Debusk Mill Road Ramblewood Drive Indian Run Road Gladys Lane Kincannon Road | Dead End | Gap between segments ending at different points along SR 607 Gap between segments ending at different points along SR 608 Gap between segments ending at different points along SR 714 Gap between segments ending at different points along SR 91 Gap between segments ending at different points along SR 754 |
| Wise | 0.49 | 0.79 | Dead End | Robinette Road Unnamed road | SR 653 | |
| York | 0.26 | 0.42 | SR 660 (Baptist Road) | York Road | SR 660 (Baptist Road) | |
