= Virginia State Route 764 =

Secondary route designation

State Route 764

Route information
- Maintained by VDOT

Location
- Country: United States
- State: Virginia

Highway system
- Virginia Routes; Interstate; US; Primary; Secondary; Byways; History; HOT lanes

State Route 764 (SR 764) in the U.S. state of Virginia is a secondary route designation applied to multiple discontinuous road segments among the many counties. The list below describes the sections in each county that are designated SR 764.

== List ==
County	Length (mi)	Length (km)	From	Via	To	Notes
Accomack	1.74	2.80	US 13 Bus (Front Street)	Courthouse Avenue Accomac Road	SR 316 (Greenbush Road)	
Albemarle	1.07	1.72	Dead End	Link Evans Lane	SR 663 (Buck Mountain Road)	
Amherst	0.50	0.80	SR 604 (Ebeneezer Road)	Cabell Lane	Dead End	
Augusta	6.70	10.78	SR 730 (North River Road)	Bear Trap Farm Road Old Mountain Road Timber Ridge Road Towers Road	SR 747 (Mossy Creek Road)	Gap between segments ending at different points along SR 731 Gap between segments ending at different points along SR 730
Bedford	1.70	2.74	Dead End	Reed Creek Road	SR 640 (Gunstock Creek Road)	
Botetourt	0.30	0.48	Dead End	Spec Mine Road Shady Side Road	Dead End	
Carroll	9.13	14.69	US 221 (Floyd Pike)	Road Creek Ford Panther Creek Road	Pulaski County line	
Chesterfield	0.70	1.13	SR 912 (Gregory Drive)	Paulhill Road	Cul-de-Sac	
Dinwiddie	0.33	0.53	SR 750 (Oxford Road)	Oxford Road	Cul-de-Sac	
Fairfax	0.90	1.45	SR 669 (Thompson Road)	Oxon Road	SR 608 (West Ox Road)	
Fauquier	1.40	2.25	Dead End	Olinger Road	SR 737 (Conde Road)	
Franklin	2.84	4.57	SR 606 (Hawpatch Road)	Carver Lee Road	SR 607 (Fairfield Road)	
Frederick	0.17	0.27	Dead End	Lee Avenue	US 11 (Martinsburg Pike)	
Halifax	0.89	1.43	North Carolina state line	Vir Drive Pine Tree Road	Dead End	
Hanover	0.50	0.80	Dead End	Pryor Lane	SR 610 (Bethany Church Road)	
Henry	0.24	0.39	SR 765 (Curwen Place)	Frank Wilson Avenue	Dead End	
James City	0.31	0.50	SR 611 (Jolly Pond Road)	Deerwood Drive	Cul-de-Sac	
Loudoun	1.15	1.85	Dead End	Buchannon Gap Road	SR 615 (Carolina Road)	
Louisa	0.50	0.80	Dead End	Will Johnson Road	SR 607 (Rock Quarry Road)	
Mecklenburg	2.63	4.23	SR 47	Piney Creek Road	SR 635 (Saffold Road)	
Montgomery	0.04	0.06	Cul-de-Sac	Circle Brook	SR 763 (Spring View Drive/Circle Brook Road)	
Pittsylvania	1.50	2.41	SR 672 (Pittsville Road)	Azalea Drive	SR 763 (Weatherford Drive)	
Prince William	0.20	0.32	US 1 (Jefferson Davis Highway)	Rosedale Court	Dead End	
Pulaski	2.28	3.67	Carroll County line	Rock Creek Road	SR 693 (Julia Simpson Road)	
Roanoke	0.30	0.48	Dead End	Vinyard Road	SR 752 (Old Mill Road)	
Rockbridge	2.10	3.38	US 11 (Lee Highway)	Possum Hollow Road	SR 251	
Rockingham	0.33	0.53	SR 717 (Indian Trail Road)	Lacey Heights Avenue	Dead End	
Scott	0.18	0.29	SR 765 (Cypress Street)	Cypress Street	SR 763 (Fir Street)	
Shenandoah	1.50	2.41	SR 614 (South Middle Road)	Walker Road	SR 698 (Turkey Knob Road)	
Spotsylvania	0.53	0.85	SR 639 (Leavells Road)	Bowen Drive	SR 1292 (Pleasants Drive)	
Stafford	0.54	0.87	SR 618 (Falls Run Drive)	Nelms Circle	Dead End	
Tazewell	0.19	0.31	Dead End	Oak Street	SR 16 (Stoney Ridge Road)	
Washington	0.30	0.48	SR 869 (Astor Road)	Shannon Hill Drive	Dead End	
Wise	0.06	0.10	Dead End	Lower Exeter Road	SR 763 (Lick Branch Road)	
York	0.33	0.53	SR 765 (Crandol Drive)	Mill Road	US 17 (George Washington Memorial Highway)	
