= Virginia State Route 276 =

State highway in Virginia, United States

State Route 276

Route information
- Maintained by VDOT
- Length: 9.43 mi (15.18 km)
- Existed: 1943–present

Major junctions
- South end: SR 256 / SR 750 at Weyers Cave
- SR 253 at Cross Keys
- North end: US 33 / SR 620 near Penn Laird

Location
- Country: United States
- State: Virginia
- Counties: Augusta, Rockingham

Highway system
- Virginia Routes; Interstate; US; Primary; Secondary; Byways; History; HOT lanes
← SR 274	→ SR 277

State Route 276 (SR 276) is a primary state highway in the U.S. state of Virginia. The state highway runs 9.43 miles (15.18 km) from SR 256 at Weyers Cave north to U.S. Route 33 (US 33) near Penn Laird.

== Route description ==
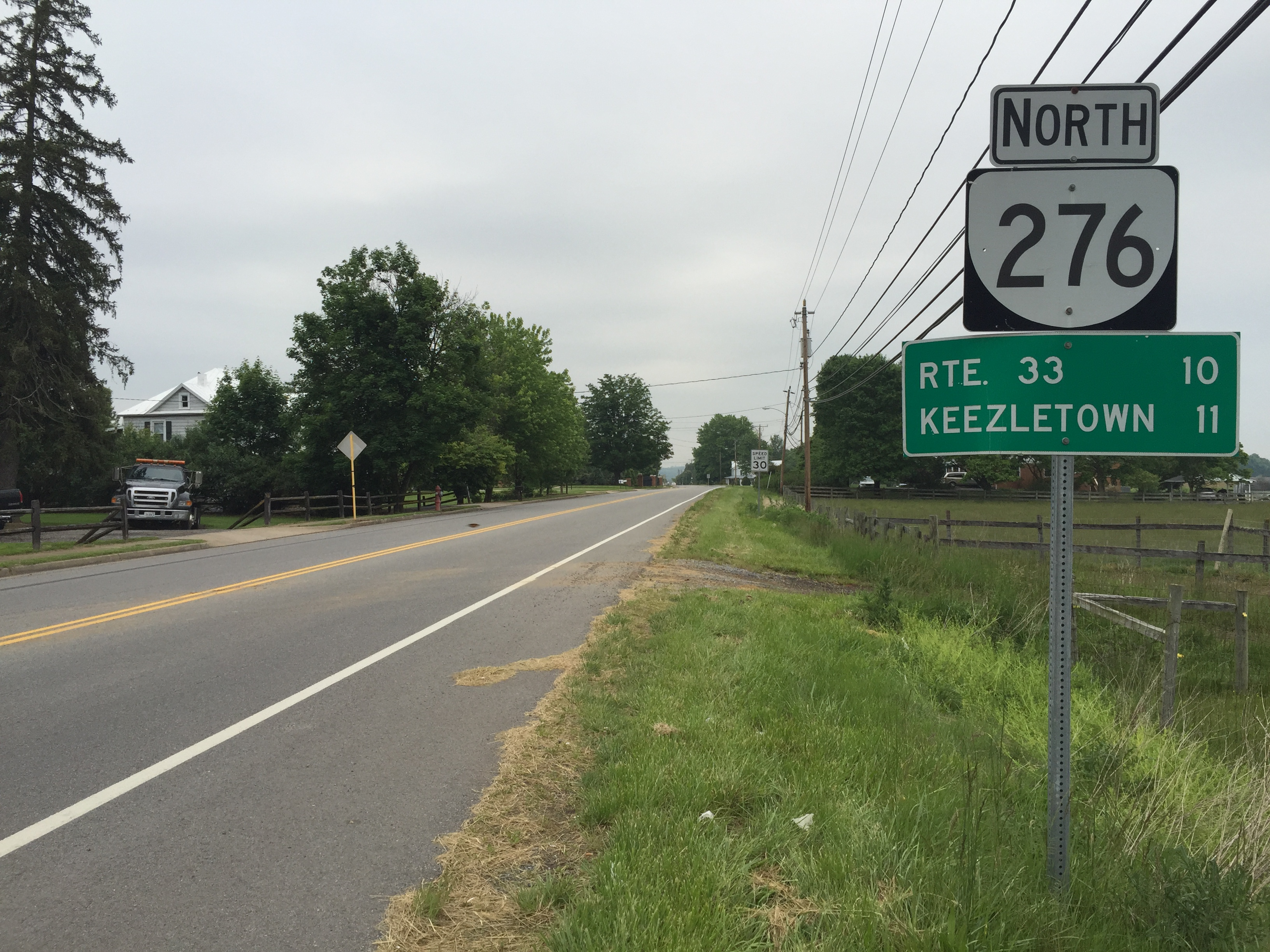
View north along SR 276 in Weyers Cave

SR 276 begins at an intersection with SR 256 (Weyers Cave Road) in the village of Weyers Cave. The highway heads northeast as two-lane undivided Keezletown Road, which also continues south from SR 256 as SR 750. SR 276 crosses the Augusta–Rockingham county line at the North River and continues as Cross Keys Road. Just north of the village of Cross Keys, the state highway intersects SR 253 (Port Republic Road). SR 276 reaches its northern terminus at US 33 (Spotswood Trail) just west of the village of Penn Laird and south of Keezletown at the southern end of Massanutten Mountain.

== Major intersections ==
County	Location	mi	km	Destinations	Notes
Augusta	Weyers Cave	0.00	0.00	SR 256 (Weyers Cave Road) / SR 750 (Keezletown Road) to US 11 – Grottoes, Airport	
Rockingham		7.23	11.64	SR 253 (Port Republic Road) – Harrisonburg, Port Republic	
Rockingham	Peales Crossroads	9.43	15.18	US 33 (Spotswood Trail) / SR 620 north (Indian Trail Road) – Keezletown, Harrisonburg, Elkton	
1.000 mi = 1.609 km; 1.000 km = 0.621 mi
