= Virginia State Route 787 =

Secondary route designation

State Route 787

Route information
- Maintained by VDOT

Location
- Country: United States
- State: Virginia

Highway system
- Virginia Routes; Interstate; US; Primary; Secondary; Byways; History; HOT lanes

State Route 787 (SR 787) in the U.S. state of Virginia is a secondary route designation applied to multiple discontinuous road segments among the many counties. The list below describes the sections in each county that are designated SR 787.

== List ==
| County | Length (mi) | Length (km) | From | Via | To | Notes |
|---|---|---|---|---|---|---|
| Accomack | 0.25 | 0.40 | SR 647 (Stonehouse Road) | Seagull Lane | Dead End | |
| Albemarle | 0.91 | 1.46 | SR 682 (Broad Axe Road) | Gillums Ridge Road | SR 708 (Dry Bridge Road) | |
| Amherst | 3.10 | 4.99 | Dead End | Burgess Road Salt Creek Road Crab Creek Road | SR 650 (Perch Road) | Gap between dead ends |
| Augusta | 1.90 | 3.06 | SR 642 (Barrenridge Road) | Cricket Road Old Mill Road | SR 907 (Tilt Hammer Circle) | Gap between segments ending at different points along SR 788 |
| Bedford | 0.50 | 0.80 | Dead End | Shadow Mountain Lane | SR 616 (Sandy Ford Road) | |
| Botetourt | 0.20 | 0.32 | Dead End | Daleway Drive | Dead End | |
| Campbell | 0.60 | 0.97 | Dead End | Archer Mill Road | SR 609 (Stage Road) | |
| Carroll | 0.24 | 0.39 | US 58 (Carrollton Pike) | Grandview Drive | SR 872 (Woodlawn Road) | |
| Fairfax | 1.86 | 2.99 | SR 620 (Braddock Road) | Olley Lane Briary Way | Dead End | |
| Fauquier | 0.37 | 0.60 | Dead End | Unnamed road Watery Mountain Road | US 17 (James Madison Highway) | |
| Franklin | 0.40 | 0.64 | Dead End | Welcome Valley Road | SR 788 (Thompson Ridge Road) | |
| Frederick | 0.15 | 0.24 | Dead End | Marcel Drive | SR 642 (Tasker Road) | |
| Halifax | 0.65 | 1.05 | SR 703 (Sandy Beach Road) | Fowler Trail | Dead End | |
| Hanover | 0.23 | 0.37 | Dead End | Spring Hill Drive | SR 643 (Rural Point Road) | |
| Henry | 0.45 | 0.72 | SR 768 (Old D&W Road) | Station Drive | SR 687 (Preston Road) | |
| James City | 0.07 | 0.11 | SR 704 (Shore Drive) | South Court | Cul-de-Sac | |
| Loudoun | 0.65 | 1.05 | Dead End | Kidwell Road | SR 671 (Harpers Ferry Road) | |
| Louisa | 0.14 | 0.23 | SR 621 (Peach Grove Road) | Alma Road | SR 788 (Plateau Road) | |
| Mecklenburg | 0.35 | 0.56 | SR 634 (Traffic Road) | Boondock Road | Dead End | |
| Montgomery | 11.40 | 18.35 | SR 600 (Piney Woods Road)/Floyd County line | Indian Valley Road Dry Valley Road Wintergreen Drive | Radford city limits | Formerly SR 102 Gap between segments ending at different points along SR 664 |
| Pittsylvania | 2.60 | 4.18 | SR 605 (Toshes Road) | Berryville Road | SR 788 (Luster Road) | |
| Prince William | 0.34 | 0.55 | SR 28 (Nokesville Road) | Farmview Road | SR 28 (Nokesville Road) | |
| Pulaski | 1.10 | 1.77 | SR 644 (Hurston Road) | Peak Creek Road | SR 611 (Newbern Road) | |
| Roanoke | 0.50 | 0.80 | SR 640 (Alleghany Drive) | Lee Road | Dead End | |
| Rockbridge | 0.19 | 0.31 | SR 791 (Furnace Hill Road) | Spring Drive | Dead End | |
| Rockingham | 0.30 | 0.48 | SR 613 (Turleytown Road) | Horn Mill Drive | Dead End | |
| Scott | 1.60 | 2.57 | SR 682 (Falls Creek Road/Bush Hill Road) | Marsh Road | SR 681 (Gillenwater Chapel Road) | |
| Shenandoah | 0.35 | 0.56 | SR 211 (Old Cross Road) | Shenandoah Drive | Cul-de-Sac | |
| Tazewell | 0.20 | 0.32 | SR 617 (Red Root Ridge Road) | Colane Road | Dead End | |
| Washington | 1.20 | 1.93 | Dead End | Celebrity Lane | US 58 (Jeb Stuart Highway) | |
| Wise | 0.36 | 0.58 | Dead End | Unnamed road | SR 692 | |
| York | 0.33 | 0.53 | SR 622 (Seaford Road) | Old Seaford Road | SR 622 (Seaford Road) | |
