= Virginia State Route 734 =

Secondary route designation

State Route 734

Route information
- Maintained by VDOT

Location
- Country: United States
- State: Virginia

Highway system
- Virginia Routes; Interstate; US; Primary; Secondary; Byways; History; HOT lanes

State Route 734 (SR 734) in the U.S. state of Virginia is a secondary route designation applied to multiple discontinuous road segments among the many counties. The list below describes the sections in each county that are designated SR 734.

== List ==
County	Length (mi)	Length (km)	From	Via	To	Notes
Accomack	1.50	2.41	SR 620 (Hollies Church Road)	Gospel Temple Road Unnamed road	SR 626 (Race Track Road)	Gap between segments ending at different points along US 13
Albemarle	0.60	0.97	Dead End	Bishop Hill Road	SR 795 (James Monroe Parkway)	
Amherst	0.68	1.09	SR 712 (Pierces Mill Road)	Pendleton Drive	Dead End	
Augusta	1.10	1.77	SR 728 (Hundley Distillery Road)	Plum Tree Draft Road Hupman Road	SR 733 (Moffet Branch Road)	Gap between segments ending at different points along SR 736
Bedford	7.83	12.60	Dead End	Trading Post Road Dundee Road	SR 626 (Smith Mountain Lake Parkway)	Gap between segments ending at different points along SR 608
Botetourt	0.61	0.98	SR 43 (Church Street)	Railroad Avenue Indian Lane	SR 742 (Branch Road)	
Campbell	1.40	2.25	Dead End	Peerman School Road	US 29 (Wards Road)	
Carroll	0.90	1.45	SR 691 (Orchard Gap Road)	Willow Hill Road	SR 670 (Volunteer Road)	
Dinwiddie	3.14	5.05	SR 619 (Courthouse Road)	Rainey Road	SR 626 (Flatfoot Road)	
Fairfax	0.27	0.43	SR 629 (Fort Hunt Road)	Cedar Dale Lane	SR 628 (Collingwood Road)	
Fauquier	1.20	1.93	SR 735 (Keyser Road)	Washwright Road	SR 688 (Leeds Manor Road)	
Franklin	5.61	9.03	SR 643 (Coles Creek Road/Hopkins Road)	Hopkins Road Antoich Road	SR 735 (Retreat Road)	Gap between segments ending at different points along SR 641
Frederick	5.50	8.85	SR 127 (Bloomery Pike)	Sleepy Creek Road	US 522 (Frederick Pike)	
Halifax	8.03	12.92	SR 49/SR 96 (Seventh Street)	Florence Avenue Red Bank Road Hogan Road	Dead End	
Hanover	0.50	0.80	SR 622 (Walnut Hill Drive)	Henley Lane	Dead End	
Henry	0.65	1.05	US 220 (Greensboro Road)	Matrimony Creek Road	Dead End	
James City	0.27	0.43	SR 726 (Kingswood Drive)	Dover Road	SR 727 (Oxford Road)	
Loudoun	15.00	24.14	SR 7 (Harry Byrd Highway)	Snickersville Turnpike	US 50 (John S Mosby Highway)	
Louisa	1.39	2.24	Cul-de-Sac	Robertson Town Road	SR 635 (West Chapel Drive)	
Mecklenburg	2.35	3.78	SR 49	Cherry Hill Road	US 58	
Montgomery	0.20	0.32	SR 785 (Catawba Road)	Natures Waye Road	Dead End	
Pittsylvania	3.84	6.18	SR 735 (Mountain Hill Road)	Clarks Mill Road Ringgold Road	SR 1124 (Ringgold Depot Lane)	Gap between US 58 and SR 1076
Prince George	0.27	0.43	SR 645 (Puddledock Road)	Waterside Road	SR 735	
Prince William	0.23	0.37	SR 735 (Walnut Street)	Overlook Drive	Cul-de-Sac	
Pulaski	0.19	0.31	SR 636 (Alum Springs Road)	Largen Hill Court	SR 618 (Eugene Street)	
Roanoke	0.56	0.90	SR 639 (West River Road)	Bohon Hollow Road	Dead End	
Rockbridge	3.10	4.99	SR 610 (Plank Road)	Broad Creek Church Road	US 11 (Lee Highway)	
Rockingham	4.68	7.53	SR 257 (Ottobine Road)	Lumber Mill Road Slab Road Bank Church Road	US 33 (Rawley Pike)	Gap between segments ending at different points along SR 738 Gap between segments ending at different points along SR 752 Gap between segments ending at different points along SR 732
Scott	0.12	0.19	Dead End	Meade Avenue	SR 71	
Shenandoah	0.72	1.16	SR 211 (West Old Cross Road)	Academy Road	Dead End	
Spotsylvania	0.80	1.29	SR 3 (Plank Road)	Greengate Road	SR 735 (Vidalia Street)	
Stafford	1.00	1.61	Dead End	Eley Road	US 17 (Warrenton Road)	
Tazewell	0.90	1.45	SR 747 (Old River Road)	Old Mountain Road	Dead End	
Washington	1.90	3.06	SR 803 (Rebel Records Lane)	McGee Lane	SR 91 (Monroe Road)	
Wise	0.06	0.10	SR 713/SR 735	Riverside Drive	SR 769 (Riverside Circle)	
York	0.15	0.24	Dead End	Byrd Lane	US 17 (George Washington Memorial Highway)	
