= Virginia State Route 757 =

Secondary route designation

State Route 757

Route information
- Maintained by VDOT

Location
- Country: United States
- State: Virginia

Highway system
- Virginia Routes; Interstate; US; Primary; Secondary; Byways; History; HOT lanes

State Route 757 (SR 757) in the U.S. state of Virginia is a secondary route designation applied to multiple discontinuous road segments among the many counties. The list below describes the sections in each county that are designated SR 757.

== List ==
County	Length (mi)	Length (km)	From	Via	To	Notes
Accomack	0.78	1.26	Cul-de-Sac	Parks Farm Road	US 13 (Lankford Highway)	
Albemarle	0.10	0.16	Dead End	Nelsons Road	SR 627 (Porters Road)	
Amherst	0.50	0.80	SR 625 (Gidsville Road)	Bellevue Road	Dead End	
Augusta	0.40	0.64	Dead End	Barger Lane	SR 758 (George Waltons Road)	
Bedford	10.16	16.35	SR 24 (Stewartsville Road)	Goodview Road Goodview Town Road	SR 608 (Emmaus Church Road)	
Botetourt	0.27	0.43	US 11 (Lee Highway)	Maple Avenue	Dead End	
Campbell	3.00	4.83	SR 660 (Oxford Furnace Road)	Country Road	SR 656 (Crews Shop Road)	
Carroll	3.67	5.91	SR 753 (Double Cabin Road)	Duncan Mill Road	SR 619 (Greasy Creek Road)	
Chesterfield	0.25	0.40	SR 647 (Hicks Road)	Dowd Lane	Dead End	
Dinwiddie	0.62	1.00	SR 708 (Namozine Road)	Marmora Drive	Dead End	
Fairfax	0.41	0.66	Dead End	McWhorter Place John Marr Drive	SR 617 (Backlick Road)	
Fauquier	0.36	0.58	SR 55 (John Marshall Highway)	Stone Church Road Old Markham Road	SR 55 (John Marshall Highway)	Gap between a dead end and SR 688
Franklin	1.93	3.11	SR 40 (Franklin Street)	Skillet Road Thornton Mountain Road	Dead End	Gap between segments ending at different points along SR 607
Frederick	0.50	0.80	SR 624 (Meadow Mills Road)	McCune Road	Dead End	
Halifax	2.00	3.22	Dead End	Beales Lane	SR 603 (Cody Road)	
Hanover	0.20	0.32	SR 756 (Rutland Road)	Alpha Road	Dead End	
Henry	0.20	0.32	SR 788 (Riverview Court)	Hillcrest Avenue	Martinsville city limits	
James City	0.14	0.23	Dead End	Mosby Lane	SR 641 (Penniman Road)	
Loudoun	0.50	0.80	Dead End	Wrights Lane	SR 694 (John Wolford Road)	
Louisa	0.38	0.61	Dead End	Wagner Farm Road	US 33 (Louisa Road)	
Mecklenburg	1.00	1.61	SR 660 (Old Cox Road)	Allsbond Lane	Dead End	
Montgomery	0.58	0.93	SR 637 (Alleghany Springs Road)	Yates Road	Dead End	
Pittsylvania	1.10	1.77	Dead End	Orange Road	SR 609 (Brights Road)	
Prince William	0.29	0.47	Cul-de-Sac	Hawkins Drive	SR 796 (Industrial Road)	
Pulaski	0.60	0.97	SR 663 (Owens Road)	Beach Drive	Dead End	
Roanoke	0.15	0.24	US 460 (Challenger Avenue)	Valley Gateway Boulevard	SR 829 (Integrity Drive)	
Rockbridge	3.60	5.79	SR 631 (Old Buena Vista Road)	Stoney Run Road	SR 820 (Whites Gap Road)	
Rockingham	0.30	0.48	SR 676 (Charlie Town Road)	Trimble Road	SR 253 (Port Republic Road)	
Scott	0.85	1.37	Dead End	Unnamed road	US 58	
Shenandoah	3.57	5.75	SR 646 (Mount Hebron Road)	Copp Road	SR 638 (Junction Road)	Gap between segments ending at different points along SR 601
Spotsylvania	0.27	0.43	Dead End	Moss Lane	SR 601 (Lewiston Road)	
Stafford	0.14	0.23	Dead End	Unnamed road	SR 611 (Widewater Road)	
Tazewell	0.04	0.06	SR 644 (Horsepen Road)	Unnamed road	West Virginia state line	
Washington	1.20	1.93	Dead End	Government Road	US 58 (Jeb Stuart Highway)	
Wise	1.09	1.75	US 23/US 23 Bus (Orby Cantrell Highway)	Norton Coeburn Road	US 23 Bus (Norton Road)	
York	0.50	0.80	Dead End	Winsome Haven Drive	SR 622 (Seaford Road)	
