= Virginia State Route 763 =

Secondary route designation

State Route 763

Route information
- Maintained by VDOT

Location
- Country: United States
- State: Virginia

Highway system
- Virginia Routes; Interstate; US; Primary; Secondary; Byways; History; HOT lanes

State Route 763 (SR 763) in the U.S. state of Virginia is a secondary route designation applied to multiple discontinuous road segments among the many counties. The list below describes the sections in each county that are designated SR 763.

== List ==
County	Length (mi)	Length (km)	From	Via	To	Notes
Accomack	4.20	6.76	SR 316 (Greenbush Road)	Adams Road Hurst Store Road Mirina Road Church Street Jones Avenue	SR 1811 (Gertrude Street)	Formerly SR 177
Albemarle	0.10	0.16	SR 606 (Dickerson Road)	Dickerson Lane	US 29 (Seminole Trail)	
Amherst	0.50	0.80	SR 604 (Bobwhite Road)	Shelter Lane	Dead End	
Augusta	2.40	3.86	SR 730 (Stokesville Road)	Old C & W Railway Road Eubank Road	SR 747 (Freemason Run Road)	
Bedford	0.10	0.16	US 50 (Lee Jackson Highway)	Plumtree Lane	Dead End	
Botetourt	0.03	0.05	SR 764 (Shady Side Road)	Spec Mine Road	SR 640 (Lithia Road)	
Campbell	0.51	0.82	SR 802 (Haney Road)	Midgett Farm Road	SR 800 (Tallyho Road)	
Carroll	2.20	3.54	SR 638 (Huff Hill Road)	Hunters Ridge Road	SR 753 (Double Cabin Road)	
Chesterfield	1.46	2.35	SR 882 (Jacobs Road)	Fordham Road	US 360 (Hull Street Road)	
Fauquier	1.37	2.20	SR 55 (John Marshall Highway)	Bunker Hill Road	SR 55 (John Marshall Highway)	
Franklin	0.20	0.32	SR 674 (Timber Ridge Road)	Vineyard Road	Dead End	
Frederick	0.02	0.03	FR-227 (Garber Lane)	Unnamed road	US 522 (Front Royal Pike)	
Halifax	0.70	1.13	SR 677 (Ridge Road)	Pine Ridge Trail	Dead End	
Hanover	0.50	0.80	Dead End	Askew Lane	SR 729 (Hollowing Creek Road)	
Henry	0.16	0.26	SR 764 (Frank Wilson Avenue)	Tenth Street	SR 701 (Tenth Street)	
James City	0.23	0.37	SR 615 (Ironbound Road)	Watford Lane	SR 672 (Carriage Road)	
Loudoun	1.10	1.77	SR 733 (Lime Kiln Road)	Steptoe Hill Road	Dead End	
Louisa	0.20	0.32	Dead End	Henson Road	SR 626 (Evergreen Road)	
Mecklenburg	1.39	2.24	SR 609 (Trottinridge Road)	Dogget Road Johnson Road	SR 609 (Trottinridge Road)	
Montgomery	0.41	0.66	SR 762 (Brookside Drive)	Circle Brook Road Spring View Drive	SR 738 (Blair Street)	
Pittsylvania	3.20	5.15	SR 609 (Brights Road)	Weatherford Drive	SR 940 (Owens Mill Road)	
Prince William	0.17	0.27	SR 750 (Woodside Drive)	Gemstone Drive	Cul-de-Sac	
Pulaski	0.70	1.13	Dead End	Hurston Road	SR 644 (Old Mill Road/Hurston Road)	
Roanoke	0.35	0.56	Dead End	Branco Drive	SR 688 (Cotton Hill Road)	
Rockbridge	1.33	2.14	SR 631 (Old Buena Vista Road)	Lincoln Road	US 11 (Lee Highway)	
Rockingham	7.31	11.76	SR 612 (Hopkins Gap Road/Peake Mountain Road)	Hopkins Gap Road Singers Glen Road Mount Clinton Pike	Harrisonburg city limits	Gap between segments ending at different points along SR 613
Scott	0.51	0.82	SR 1422 (Vanzant Drive)	Park Street Fir Street	SR 783 (Fir Street)	
Shenandoah	3.16	5.09	SR 605/SR 780	Patmos Road	Dead End	Gap between segments ending at different points along SR 604
Spotsylvania	0.60	0.97	SR 719 (Days Bridge Road)	Don Road	Dead End	
Stafford	0.37	0.60	Dead End	Beagle Road	SR 652 (Truslow Road)	
Tazewell	0.14	0.23	SR 670 (Mill Creek Road)	Youngs Road	Dead End	
Washington	0.30	0.48	Dead End	Ohio Drive	SR 640 (Benhams Road)	
Wise	0.31	0.50	SR 68	Lick Branch Road	SR 764 (Lower Exeter Road)	
York	0.14	0.23	Dead End	Chisman Circle	SR 712 (York Point Road)	
