= Virginia State Route 707 =

Secondary route designation

State Route 707

Route information
- Maintained by VDOT

Location
- Country: United States
- State: Virginia

Highway system
- Virginia Routes; Interstate; US; Primary; Secondary; Byways; History; HOT lanes

State Route 707 (SR 707) in the U.S. state of Virginia is a secondary route designation applied to multiple discontinuous road segments among the many counties. The list below describes the sections in each county that are designated SR 707.

== List ==
County	Length (mi)	Length (km)	From	Via	To	Notes
Accomack	1.70	2.74	SR 709 (Depot Street/Farlow Road)	Slocum Farm Road Dunns Swamp Road	Maryland state line	Gap between segments ending at different points along SR 705
Albemarle	0.35	0.56	SR 691 (Jarmans Gap Road)	Blair Park Road	Dead End	
Alleghany	0.10	0.16	SR 697 (Carlyle Street)	Rose Avenue	Dead End	
Amherst	0.88	1.42	Dead End	Iron Bridge Road	SR 657 (Cedar Gate Road)	
Augusta	3.45	5.55	SR 876 (Glebe School Road)	Trimbles Mill Road Trimbles Road Livick Road	SR 708 (Glebe School Road)	
Bedford	5.36	8.63	SR 43 (Leesville Road)	Lone Oak Crossing Bethesda Drive Ephesus Road	SR 715 (Otter Hill Road)	Gap between segments ending at different points along SR 24 Gap between segments ending at different points along SR 714
Botetourt	2.15	3.46	Dead End	Deisher Boulevard	SR 615 (Craig Creek Road)	
Campbell	0.06	0.10	SR 712 (Riverbend Road)	Castaway Road	SR 640 (Mansion Bridge Road)	
Carroll	6.89	11.09	SR 635 (Hebron Road)	Mount Zion Road Senior Road Training Center Road Partridge Road	Dead End	Gap between segments ending at different points along SR 620
Chesterfield	0.50	0.80	SR 695 (Garnett Lane)	LE Gordon Drive	US 60 (Midlothian Turnpike)	
Dinwiddie	0.85	1.37	SR 683 (Continental Road)	Cantree Road	SR 651 (Whitmore Road)	
Fauquier	1.30	2.09	SR 709 (Zulla Road)	Milestone Road	SR 704 (Whitewood Road)	
Franklin	5.92	9.53	US 220	Muse Sealed Road Muse Field Road Ashpone Tavern Road	SR 619 (Fanny Cook Road)	Gap between a dead end and SR 674
Frederick	3.85	6.20	West Virginia state line	Hollow Road	SR 259 (Carpers Pike)	
Halifax	2.67	4.30	SR 711 (Denniston Road/Harmony Road)	Paradise Road	SR 658 (Cluster Springs Road)	
Hanover	0.20	0.32	SR 663 (Center Street)	Gwathmey Church Road	Dead End	
Henry	0.87	1.40	SR 966 (Rives Road)	Rivermont Heights Road	Martinsville city limits	
James City	0.11	0.18	Dead End	Kathryl Court	SR 706 (Winston Drive)	
Loudoun	1.50	2.41	SR 704 (Harmony Church Road)	Digges Valley Road	SR 662 (Canby Road)	
Louisa	0.20	0.32	SR 208 (Courthouse Road)	Charles Lane	Dead End	
Mecklenburg	8.76	14.10	SR 4 (Buggs Island Road)	China Grove Road Phillis Road Washington Street	US 58 Bus/SR 92	
Middlesex	0.71	1.14	SR 3/SR 33 (General Puller Highway)	Grafton Church Road	SR 3/SR 33 (General Puller Highway)	
Montgomery	1.00	1.61	Dead End	Broad Shoals Road	SR 8 (Riner Road)	
Pittsylvania	3.18	5.12	SR 662 (Dodson Road)	Mac Road Cox Store Road	SR 706 (Game Reserve Road)	Gap between segments ending at different points along SR 640
Prince George	0.28	0.45	SR 642 (Beavercastle Road)	Lemonwood Drive	Cul-de-Sac	
Prince William	0.25	0.40	US 29 (Lee Highway)	Gallerher Road	SR 55 (John Marshall Highway)	
Pulaski	0.13	0.21	SR 1011 (West Avenue)	High Street	SR 1012 (Walker Avenue)	
Roanoke	0.24	0.39	US 221 (Bent Mountain Road)	Lank Mark Circle	US 221 (Bent Mountain Road)	
Rockbridge	1.46	2.35	US 11 (Lee Highway)	Jonestown Road	Dead End	Gap between segments ending at different points along SR 706
Rockingham	0.23	0.37	Cul-de-Sac	Bark Wagon Road	SR 773 (Mayberry Road)	
Scott	2.17	3.49	US 23	Unnamed road	SR 704 (East Carters Valley Road)	
Shenandoah	5.74	9.24	SR 698 (Palmyra Church Road)	Red Banks Road Belgravia Road Headquarters Road Unnamed road	SR 694 (Wolverton Road)	Gap between segments ending at different points along US 11 Gap between segments ending at different points along SR 614
Spotsylvania	0.46	0.74	SR 3 (Plank Road)	Chewning Lane	Dead End	
Stafford	0.66	1.06	SR 630 (Courthouse Road)	Dent Road	Dead End	
Tazewell	1.37	2.20	Richlands town limits	Edgewater Drive	US 460 Bus	
Washington	1.30	2.09	Dead End	Remine Road	SR 706 (Rivermont Road)	
Wise	1.80	2.90	SR 671 (Flat Gap Road)	Unnamed road	SR 627 (Donald Branch Road)	
York	0.19	0.31	SR 708 (Basta Drive)	Janis Drive	SR 631 (Waterview Road)	
