= Virginia State Route 735 =

Secondary route designation

State Route 735

Route information
- Maintained by VDOT

Location
- Country: United States
- State: Virginia

Highway system
- Virginia Routes; Interstate; US; Primary; Secondary; Byways; History; HOT lanes

State Route 735 (SR 735) in the U.S. state of Virginia is a secondary route designation applied to multiple discontinuous road segments among the many counties. The list below describes the sections in each county that are designated SR 735.

== List ==
County	Length (mi)	Length (km)	From	Via	To	Notes
Accomack	0.10	0.16	Dead End	Robertson Lane	SR 658 (Town Road)	
Albemarle	2.30	3.70	SR 602 (Howardsville Turnpike)	Mount Alto Road	SR 626 (James River Road)	
Amherst	1.50	2.41	SR 665 (Flat Woods Road)	Maple Run Road	Dead End	
Augusta	0.40	0.64	SR 728 (Hundley Distillery Road/Stover Shop Road)	Green Valley Road	SR 736 (Union Church Road)	
Bedford	5.80	9.33	SR 732 (Headens Bridge Road)	Rock Cliff Road	SR 122 (Moneta Road)	
Botetourt	1.38	2.22	Cul-de-Sac	Shawnee Trail	SR 665 (Country Club Road)	
Campbell	0.42	0.68	Cul-de-Sac	Lazy Creeks Drive	SR 622 (Depot Road)	
Carroll	4.57	7.35	SR 635 (Hebron Road)	Pridemore Road Nebo Road Backwoods Road	SR 620/SR 742	Gap between dead ends Gap between segments ending at different points along SR 733
Chesterfield	0.48	0.77	SR 36 (River Road)	Winfree Avenue	SR 1366 (Butler Lane)	
Dinwiddie	1.40	2.25	SR 619 (Courthouse Road)	Goose Pond Road	Dead End	
Fairfax	0.20	0.32	SR 1267 (Rosemont Avenue)	Leaf Road	SR 622 (Pole Road)	
Fauquier	4.00	6.44	SR 688 (Leeds Manor Road)	Keyser Road	Dead End	
Franklin	4.82	7.76	SR 643 (Bethlehem Road)	Retreat Road	SR 919 (Grassy Hill Road)	
Frederick	4.55	7.32	Warren County line	Riding Chapel Road Unnamed road Salem Church Road	US 11 (Valley Pike)	
Halifax	2.20	3.54	SR 734 (Red Bank Road)	Gills Mountain Road	SR 606 (Rice School Road)	
Hanover	1.17	1.88	Dead End	Annfield Road	SR 671 (Scotchtown Road)	
Henry	0.50	0.80	Dead End	Wells Hollow Road	SR 666 (Trenthill Drive)	
James City	0.50	0.80	SR 606 (Riverview Road)	Plantation Drive	SR 606/SR 749 (Sherwood Forest Road)	
Loudoun	1.80	2.90	SR 734 (Snickersville Turnpike)	Black Oak Road	SR 725 (Paxson Road)	
Louisa	0.46	0.74	SR 618 (Fredericks Hall Road)	Colemans Lane	Dead End	
Mecklenburg	8.31	13.37	North Carolina state line	Averett Church Road White House Road Hite Drive	US 58	Gap between SR 867 and SR 49
Montgomery	0.38	0.61	SR 652 (McCoy Road)	Riverside Drive	SR 652 (McCoy Road)	
Pittsylvania	4.80	7.72	North Carolina state line	Cedar Road Mountain Hill Road	North Carolina state line	
Prince George	0.14	0.23	SR 736	Lowes Drive	SR 734	
Prince William	0.65	1.05	SR 638 (Colchester Road)	Walnut Street	SR 636 (Featherstone Road)	
Pulaski	0.10	0.16	SR 99 (Count Pulaski Drive)/SR 771 (Craig Loop)	Frog Level Court	Dead End	
Roanoke	0.54	0.87	Dead End	Coleman Road	US 221 (Bent Mountain Road)	
Rockbridge	1.20	1.93	Dead End	Unnamed road	SR 699 (Wesley Chapel Road)	
Rockingham	1.00	1.61	SR 701 (Silver Lake Road)	Linhoss Road	SR 736 (Swope Road)	
Scott	0.39	0.63	Dead End	Boone Street Reading Road	SR 1111 (Ventor Drive)	
Shenandoah	0.61	0.98	SR 1002 (Old Cross Road)	White Mill Road Smith Creek Road	SR 620 (Smith Creek Road)	
Spotsylvania	0.09	0.14	SR 639 (Bragg Road)	Vidalia Street	SR 734 (Greengate Road)	
Stafford	0.46	0.74	Dead End	Wyatt Lane	SR 753 (Enon Road)	
Tazewell	0.38	0.61	SR 61 (Clearfork Road)	Albany Street	Dead End	
Washington	5.00	8.05	US 11 (Lee Highway)	Hawthorne Drive Ramblewood Drive	SR 736 (Indian Run Road/Ramblewood Drive)	Gap between segments ending at different points along SR 803
Wise	0.16	0.26	SR 713/SR 734	Riverside Circle	SR 769 (Riverside Circle)	
York	0.32	0.51	Dead End	Greenland Drive	SR 706 (Yorktown Road)	
