= Virginia State Route 256 =

State highway in Virginia, United States

State Route 256

Route information
- Maintained by VDOT
- Length: 6.78 mi (10.91 km)
- Existed: 1933–present

Major junctions
- West end: US 11 near Weyers Cave
- I-81 near Weyers Cave; SR 276 / SR 750 in Weyers Cave
- East end: US 340 in Grottoes

Location
- Country: United States
- State: Virginia
- Counties: Augusta, Rockingham

Highway system
- Virginia Routes; Interstate; US; Primary; Secondary; Byways; History; HOT lanes
← SR 255	→ SR 257

State Route 256 (SR 256) is a primary state highway in the U.S. state of Virginia. Known for most of its length as Weyers Cave Road, the state highway runs 6.78 miles (10.91 km) from U.S. Route 11 (US 11) near Weyers Cave east to US 340 in Grottoes. SR 256 connects Interstate 81 (I-81) with Weyers Cave in northern Augusta County and Grottoes, which is home to Grand Caverns, in southeastern Rockingham County.

== Route description ==
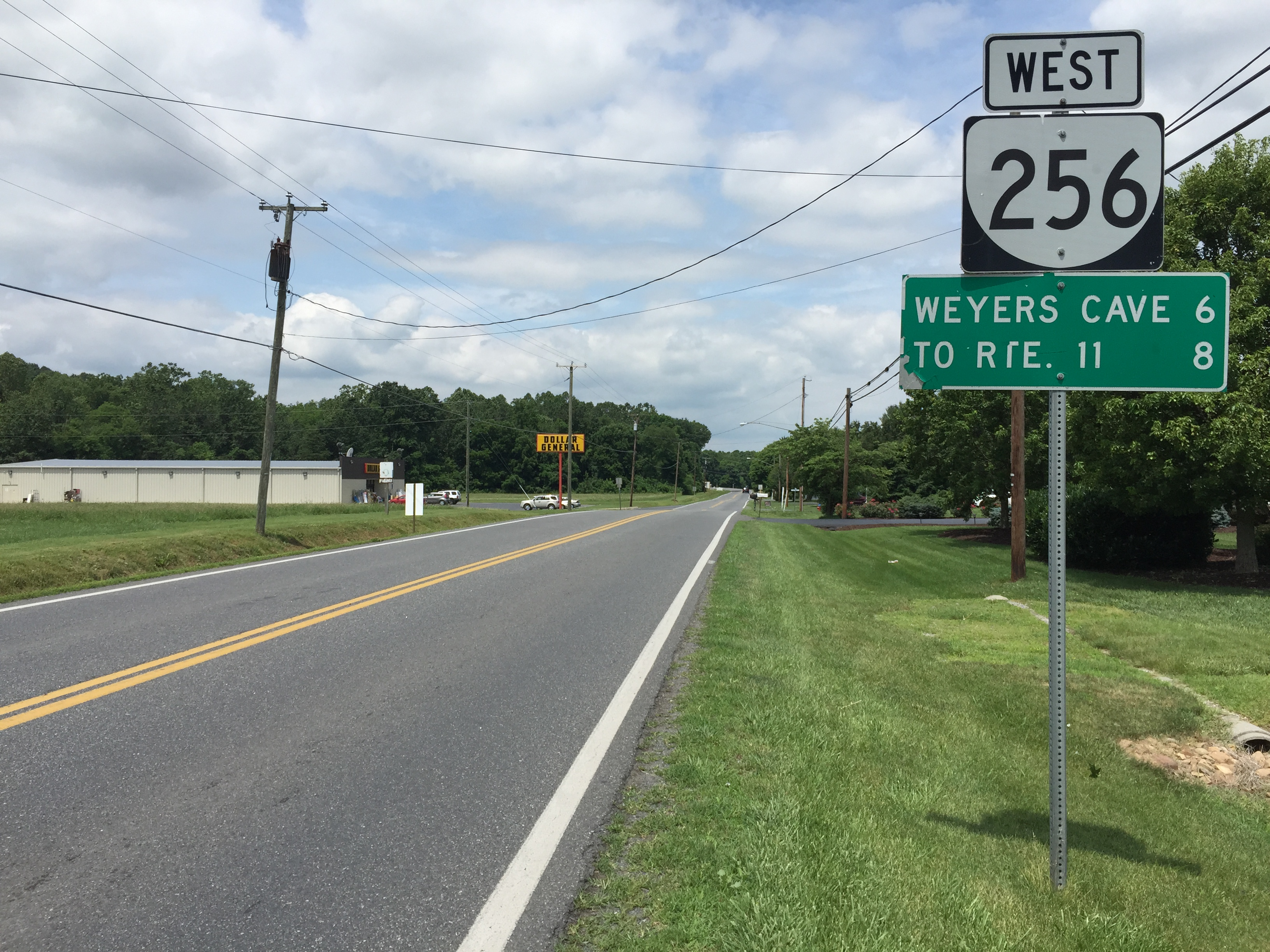
View west near the east end of SR 256 at US 340 in Grottoes

SR 256 begins at an intersection with US 11 (Lee Highway) west of Weyers Cave. The state highway heads east as two-lane undivided Weyers Cave Road, which immediately has a diamond interchange with I-81. SR 256 has a grade crossing of the Chesapeake Western Railway and meets the southern end of SR 276 (Keezletown Road) in the community of Weyers Cave. The state highway passes Shenandoah Valley Regional Airport and crosses the Middle River, a tributary of the North River. SR 276 then crosses the South River—which with the North River forms the South Fork Shenandoah River—into Rockingham County and the town of Grottoes. The state highway passes along the southern edge of the town as 3rd Street and provides access to Grand Caverns, a National Natural Landmark that was originally known as Weyer's Cave and is the oldest show cave in the United States. SR 256 has a grade crossing of Norfolk Southern Railway's Roanoke District before reaching its eastern terminus at US 340 (East Side Highway).

== Major intersections ==
County	Location	mi	km	Destinations	Notes
Augusta		0.00	0.00	US 11 (Lee Highway) – Mount Sidney, Harrisonburg, Blue Ridge College	Western terminus
Augusta		0.14	0.23	I-81 – Harrisonburg, Staunton	Exit 235 (I-81)
Augusta	Weyers Cave	1.36	2.19	SR 276 north / SR 750 (Keezletown Road) to US 33	Southern terminus of SR 276
Augusta		2.65	4.26	SR 750 (Airport Road) – Shenandoah Valley Regional Airport	
Augusta		4.59	7.39	SR 865 (Rockfish Road) – Mt. Meridian, New Hope	former SR 12 south
Augusta		4.95	7.97	SR 605 (Lee Roy Road) – Port Republic	
Rockingham	Grottoes	6.28	10.11	SR 825 (Dogwood Avenue) – Grand Caverns Regional Park	former SR 12 north
Rockingham	Grottoes	6.78	10.91	US 340 (Augusta Avenue) – Elkton, Waynesboro	Eastern terminus
1.000 mi = 1.609 km; 1.000 km = 0.621 mi
