= Virginia State Route 737 =

Secondary route designation

State Route 737

Route information
- Maintained by VDOT

Location
- Country: United States
- State: Virginia

Highway system
- Virginia Routes; Interstate; US; Primary; Secondary; Byways; History; HOT lanes

State Route 737 (SR 737) in the U.S. state of Virginia is a secondary route designation applied to multiple discontinuous road segments among the many counties. The list below describes the sections in each county that are designated SR 737.

== List ==
County	Length (mi)	Length (km)	From	Via	To	Notes
Accomack	0.10	0.16	SR 692 (Savannah Road)	Ross Road	SR 700 (Messongo Road)	
Albemarle	2.00	3.22	SR 6 (Irish Road)	Mountain Vista Road	SR 6/SR 20 (Valley Street)	
Amherst	0.40	0.64	Dead End	C & O Lane	Nelson County line	
Augusta	1.80	2.90	SR 736 (Jennings Gap Road)	Dry Den Road	SR 42 (Scenic Highway)	
Bedford	5.23	8.42	SR 608 (White House Road)	Ayers Road	SR 732 (Headens Bridge Road)	
Botetourt	0.25	0.40	SR 779 (Catawba Road)	Hogan Hollow Road	Dead End	
Campbell	3.10	4.99	SR 651 (Bear Creek Road)	Wheeler Road	SR 656 (Plum Branch Road)	
Carroll	4.35	7.00	SR 94 (Ivanhoe Road)	Swinney Hollow Road Buck Dam Road	Dead End	Gap between a dead end and SR 602
Chesterfield	0.60	0.97	SR 604 (Courthouse Road)	Doublecreek Court Reycan Road	SR 701 (Whitepine Road)	Gap between dead ends
Dinwiddie	1.60	2.57	SR 665 (Walkers Mill Road)	Booth Road	SR 626 (Flatfoot Road)	
Fauquier	5.25	8.45	Dead End	Ernest Robinson Road Conde Road	Dead End	Gap between segments ending at different points along SR 732
Franklin	4.48	7.21	SR 641 (Callaway Road)	Deyerle Knob Road Hickman Road	SR 734 (Hopkins Road)	Gap between segments ending at different points along SR 643
Frederick	0.51	0.82	Dead End	Wise Mill Lane	SR 640 (Grim Road)	
Halifax	4.50	7.24	SR 602 (North Fork Church Road)	Hudson Road	SR 601 (Bucksheal Road)	
Hanover	0.60	0.97	US 360 (Mechanicsville Turnpike)	Westhaven Drive	Dead End	
Henry	0.47	0.76	SR 1140 (Sunrise Avenue)	April Boulevard	SR 799 (Dexter Street)	
James City	0.95	1.53	SR 716 (South Riverside Drive)	Canal Street Osprey Drive	SR 1014 (Otey Drive)	
Loudoun	0.82	1.32	SR 719 (Greengarden Road)	Piney Swamp Road	Dead End	
Louisa	0.25	0.40	SR 208 (Courthouse Road)	Pleasant View Drive	Dead End	
Mecklenburg	5.30	8.53	North Carolina state line	Nelson Church Road	SR 602 (White House Road)	
Montgomery	1.26	2.03	Dead End	Thomas Lane	SR 685 (Prices Fork Road)	
Prince William	0.11	0.18	SR 636 (Featherstone Road)	Sycamore Street	SR 735 (Walnut Street)	
Roanoke	0.80	1.29	Dead End	Gladden Road	SR 639 (Harborwood Road)	
Rockbridge	0.30	0.48	US 11 (Lee Highway)	Dog Town Loop	US 11 (Lee Highway)	
Rockingham	3.50	5.63	SR 752 (Hinton Road/Rushville Road)	Rushville Road Limestone Lane Cannery Woods Drive	SR 738 (Dry River Road)	Gap between segments ending at different points along SR 736 Gap between segments ending at different points along SR 257
Scott	0.04	0.06	SR 735 (Boone Street)	Clinch Street	Dead End	
Shenandoah	1.50	2.41	US 11 (Old Valley Pike)	Cedar Lane	SR 620 (Smith Creek Road)	
Stafford	0.08	0.13	Dead End	Jay Road	SR 730 (Lake Shore Drive)	
Tazewell	0.60	0.97	Dead End	Sluss Hollow Road	SR 659 (Exhibit Mine Road)	
Washington	2.55	4.10	US 11 (Lee Highway)	College Drive	Dead End	Gap between segments ending at different points along SR 609
Wise	0.14	0.23	SR 656	Unnamed road	Dead End	
York	0.28	0.45	Dead End	Unnamed road	SR 645 (Airport Road)	
