= Virginia State Route 756 =

State highway in Virginia, United States

State Route 756

Route information
- Maintained by VDOT

Location
- Country: United States
- State: Virginia

Highway system
- Virginia Routes; Interstate; US; Primary; Secondary; Byways; History; HOT lanes

State Route 756 (SR 756) in the U.S. state of Virginia is a secondary route designation applied to multiple discontinuous road segments among the many counties. The list below describes the sections in each county that are designated SR 756.

== List ==
County	Length (mi)	Length (km)	From	Via	To	Notes
Accomack	0.09	0.14	SR 695 (Saxis Road)	Lees Circle	End of state maintenance	
Albemarle	0.30	0.48	Dead End	CCC Road	SR 668 (Walnut Level Road)	
Amherst	0.66	1.06	Dead End	Bryant Road	SR 622 (New Wright Shop Road)	
Augusta	6.00	9.66	SR 730 (Stribling Springs Road)	Buck Hill Road Oak Hill School Road Dividing Ridge Road Fairburn Road George Waltons Road Whetstone Draft Road	SR 731 (Natural Chimneys Road)	Gap between segments ending at different points along SR 760
Bedford	1.80	2.90	SR 653 (Mill Iron Road)	Bruno Drive	SR 616 (Sandy Level Road)	
Botetourt	0.22	0.35	SR 779 (Valley Road)	Dale Road	Dead End	
Campbell	1.80	2.90	SR 601 (Juniper Cliff Road)	Red Bottom Road	Charlotte County line	
Carroll	1.90	3.06	SR 757 (Duncan Mill Road)	Goad Drive	SR 622 (Indian Valley Road)	
Chesterfield	0.61	0.98	Dead End	Family Lane	Dead End	
Dinwiddie	0.28	0.45	SR 628 (Tranquility Lane)	Slates Road	Dead End	
Fairfax	0.37	0.60	SR 757 (McWhorter Place)	Markham Street	SR 650 (Annandale Road)	
Fauquier	0.10	0.16	SR 55 (John Marshall Highway)	Old Sage Road	SR 724 (Sage Road)	
Franklin	14.96	24.08	SR 641 (Callaway Road)	Old Forge Road Ruritan Road Fishburne Mountain Road	US 220 (Virgil H Goode Highway)	Gap between segments ending at different points along SR 40 Gap between segments ending at different points along SR 619
Frederick	1.73	2.78	Cul-de-Sac	Unnamed road	US 522 (Front Royal Pike)	
Halifax	0.80	1.29	SR 57 (Chatham Road)	Cheerful Lane	SR 675 (Ridgeway Road)	
Hanover	0.56	0.90	Dead End	Rutland Road	Dead End	
Henry	0.17	0.27	SR 673 (Bullocks Drive)	Reed Stone Street	SR 57 (Fairystone Park Highway)	
James City	0.42	0.68	SR 746	Norman Davis Drive	SR 1624 (Welstead Drive)	
Loudoun	1.20	1.93	SR 736 (Furr Road)	Poor House Lane	SR 700 (Woodtrail Road)	
Louisa	0.30	0.48	Dead End	Yancy Drive	SR 601 (Paynes Mill Road)	
Mecklenburg	1.37	2.20	US 58	Jefferson Street	SR 1213 (Jefferson Street)	
Montgomery	0.15	0.24	SR 626 (Gardner Road)	Historic Drive	Dead End	
Pittsylvania	4.00	6.44	SR 940 (Owens Mill Road)	Paisley Road Dewberry Road	US 29	
Prince William	0.09	0.14	Cul-de-Sac	Barrley Court	SR 777 (Barrley Drive)	
Pulaski	0.16	0.26	SR 662 (Lyons Road)	Redwood Lane	Dead End	
Rockbridge	0.08	0.13	Dead End	Hunter Hill Extension Road	SR 752 (Hunter Hill Road)	
Rockingham	0.93	1.50	SR 712 (Mosby Road/Lewis Byrd Road)	Liskey Road	Harrisonburg city limits	
Scott	1.50	2.41	Tennessee state line	Akard Lane	SR 617	
Shenandoah	0.07	0.11	SR 623 (Back Road)	Cottontown Road	SR 55 (John Marshall Highway)	
Spotsylvania	0.84	1.35	Dead End	Lee Hill Drive Joseph Mills Drive	Dead End	
Stafford	0.47	0.76	SR 637 (Telegraph Road)	Midway Road	SR 611 (Widewater Road)	
Tazewell	0.09	0.14	SR 651 (T R Barrett Road)	Mays Road	Dead End	
Washington	0.10	0.16	US 58 (Jeb Stuart Highway)	Doe Run Lane	SR 601 (Beech Mountain Road)	
Wise	0.10	0.16	SR 1129 (May Avenue)	Railroad Street	Dead End	
York	0.19	0.31	Cul-de-Sac	Don Juan Circle	SR 754 (Shamrock Avenue)	
