= Virginia State Route 754 =

Secondary route designation

State Route 754

Route information
- Maintained by VDOT

Location
- Country: United States
- State: Virginia

Highway system
- Virginia Routes; Interstate; US; Primary; Secondary; Byways; History; HOT lanes

State Route 754 (SR 754) in the U.S. state of Virginia is a secondary route designation applied to multiple discontinuous road segments among the many counties. The list below describes the sections in each county that are designated SR 754.

== List ==
County	Length (mi)	Length (km)	From	Via	To	Notes
Accomack	0.20	0.32	SR 605 (Drummontown Road)	Chancetown Road	SR 605 (Drummontown Road)	
Albemarle	0.19	0.31	SR 767 (Rabbit Valley Road)	Loving Road	Dead End	
Amherst	0.80	1.29	Dead End	Pryor Creek Road	SR 610 (Puppy Creek Road)	
Augusta	3.30	5.31	SR 731 (Natural Chimneys Road)	Badger Road Dudley Road	SR 699 (Ridge Road)	Gap between segments ending at different points along SR 613
Bedford	4.50	7.24	SR 746 (Dickerson Mill Road)	Saunders Grove Road	SR 755 (Union Church Road/Simmons Mill Road)	
Botetourt	0.07	0.11	SR 718 (Fielddale Road)	Quarry Road	Dead End	
Campbell	0.61	0.98	US 29 (Wards Road)	Anstey Road	Dead End	
Carroll	2.40	3.86	SR 625 (Brannon Road)	Dickerson Road	US 221 (Floyd Pike)	
Chesterfield	7.13	11.47	SR 288	Commonwealth Center Parkway Old Hundred Road Charter Colony Parkway Coalfield Road	US 60 (Midlothian Turnpike)	Gap between SR 6040 and a dead end
Dinwiddie	0.88	1.42	Dead End	Anderson Mill Road	SR 751 (Cox Road)	
Fauquier	0.23	0.37	SR 731 (Cobbler Mountain Road)	Dead End Road	Dead End	
Franklin	2.91	4.68	SR 756 (Ruritan Road)	Falcon Ridge Road Rakes Road	Rocky Mount town limits	
Frederick	0.07	0.11	SR 659 (Valley Mill Road)	Ash Hollow Drive	Cul-de-Sac	
Halifax	0.65	1.05	SR 644 (Stoney Ridge Road)	Cora Watts Trail	Dead End	
Hanover	0.40	0.64	SR 753 (Patrick Henry Boulevard)	Fort Myers Road	Dead End	
Henry	1.07	1.72	SR 903 (TB Stanley Highway)	Edgewood Drive	SR 606 (Oak Level Road)	
James City	0.38	0.61	US 60 (Richmond Road)	Industrial Boulevard	Dead End	
Loudoun	1.20	1.93	US 50 (John S Mosby Highway)	Kirk Branch Road	Dead End	
Louisa	0.25	0.40	SR 640 (Old Mountain Road)	Bakers Branch Road	Dead End	
Mecklenburg	1.11	1.79	Dead End	Alpine Road	US 1	
Montgomery	0.50	0.80	US 11 (Roanoke Road)	Calloway Street	SR 631 (Brake Road)	
Pittsylvania	2.93	4.72	Dead End	Gallows Road	SR 642 (Marina Drive/Shula Drive)	
Prince William	0.07	0.11	Dead End	Qualls Road	SR 753 (Ridgefield Village Drive)	
Pulaski	0.17	0.27	SR 1206 (Page Lane)	Rose Lane	SR 749 (Pine Street)	
Roanoke	0.36	0.58	US 221 (Bent Mountain Road)	Coles Road	Dead End	
Rockbridge	0.27	0.43	Dead End	Old Marvin Road	SR 716 (Timber Ridge Road)	
Rockingham	5.53	8.90	US 340 (East Side Highway)	Rocky Bar Road Berrytown Road South Branch Road	US 340 (East Side Highway)	
Scott	1.94	3.12	SR 671 (Twin Springs Road)	Culbertson Branch Road Bethel Road	SR 682 (Falls Creek Road)	
Shenandoah	0.63	1.01	SR 55 (John Marshall Highway)	Laurel Hill Way	SR 55 (John Marshall Highway)	
Spotsylvania	0.30	0.48	SR 684 (Craigs Church Lane)	Hayden Road	Dead End	
Stafford	1.70	2.74	SR 612 (Hartwood Road)	Shackelford Well Road	SR 616 (Poplar Road)	
Tazewell	0.87	1.40	Dead End	Carter Hill Road Roma Road	SR 680 (Irson Road)	
Washington	1.40	2.25	US 11 (Lee Highway)	Old Stage Road	US 11 (Lee Highway)	
Wise	0.09	0.14	SR 690 (Prospect Avenue)	Fifth Street	SR 696 (Fifth Street)	
York	0.35	0.56	SR 798 (Trivalon Court)	Shamrock Avenue	US 17 (George Washington Memorial Highway)	
