= Virginia State Route 704 =

Circle Signs Of Virginia

State Route 704

Route information
- Maintained by VDOT

Location
- Country: United States
- State: Virginia

Highway system
- Virginia Routes; Interstate; US; Primary; Secondary; Byways; History; HOT lanes

State Route 704 (SR 704) in the U.S. state of Virginia is a secondary route designation applied to multiple discontinuous road segments among the many counties. The list below describes the sections in each county that are designated SR 704.

== List ==
County	Length (mi)	Length (km)	From	Via	To	Notes
Accomack	4.93	7.93	SR 705 (Holland Road)	Green Hill Road Coardtown Road Dream Road	SR 679 (Fleming Road)	Gap between segments ending at different points along US 13 Gap between segments ending at different points along SR 175
Albemarle	1.60	2.57	Dead End	Fortune Lane	SR 715 (Esmont Road)	
Alleghany	0.38	0.61	Dead End	Cliffview Drive	SR 721	
Amherst	0.28	0.45	SR 130 (Elon Road)	Horse Shoe Bend Road	SR 130 (Elon Road)	
Augusta	0.67	1.08	SR 693 (Cedar Creek Road)	William Cousins Road	SR 254 (Parkersburg Turnpike)	
Bedford	2.90	4.67	SR 705 (Terrace View Road)	Matthew Talbot Road Great Oak Road	SR 811 (Thomas Jefferson Road)	Gap between segments ending at different points along SR 643
Botetourt	1.80	2.90	Dead End	Lignite Road Branchwater Road	SR 817 (Old Rail Road)	Gap between segments ending at different points along SR 615
Campbell	1.10	1.77	SR 705 (Covered Bridge Road)	Seneca Road	Dead End	
Carroll	0.60	0.97	SR 697 (Reedside Drive)	Baltimore Road	SR 685 (Baltimore Road/Winding Ridge Road)	
Chesterfield	0.42	0.68	SR 673 (Old Gun Road)	Cherokee Road	Richmond city limits	
Dinwiddie	0.24	0.39	Dead End	Blackwell Road	SR 660 (Quaker Road)	
Fairfax	0.79	1.27	US 29 (Lee Highway)	Hollywood Road	SR 705 (West Street)	
Fauquier	3.20	5.15	SR 55 (John Marshall Highway)	Whitewood Road	SR 702 (Rock Hill Mill Road)	
Franklin	1.02	1.64	SR 705 (Chestnut Hill Road)	Greenway Road	SR 702 (Farm View Road)	
Frederick	7.59	12.21	West Virginia state line	Back Creek Road	SR 751 (Gore Road)	
Halifax	5.56	8.95	US 501 (Huell Matthews Highway)	Black Walnut Church Road Old Cluster Springs Road	US 58 (Philpott Road)	Gap between segments ending at different points along SR 658
Hanover	1.30	2.09	SR 771 (Echo Meadows Road)	Rosemont Drive	SR 620 (Dogwood Trail Road)	
Henry	0.55	0.89	Dead End	Applegate Lane	SR 993 (Reed Creek Drive)	
James City	0.34	0.55	Dead End	Shore Drive	SR 703 (Laurel Lane)	
Loudoun	9.57	15.40	US 15 (James Monroe Highway)	Harmony Church Road Hamilton Station Road	SR 662 (Clarkes Gap Road)	Gap between segments ending at different points along SR 7 Bus
Louisa	0.40	0.64	Dead End	Porter Town Road	SR 660 (Red Hill Road)	
Mecklenburg	2.00	3.22	Dead End	Lambert Road	SR 707 (Phillis Road)	
Montgomery	0.10	0.16	SR 8 (Riner Road)	Carriage Road	SR 671 (Five Point Road)	
Pittsylvania	0.20	0.32	Dead End	Fairoaks Road	SR 751 (Grassland Drive)	
Prince William	1.60	2.57	SR 676 (Catharpin Road)	Artemus Road	SR 705 (Pageland Lane)	
Pulaski	1.30	2.09	SR 665 (Simpkinstown Road)	Greenhouse Road Covey Hollow Road	SR 619 (Bleak Ridge Road)	Gap between segments ending at different points along SR 693
Roanoke	1.10	1.77	Dead End	Damewood Drive	SR 701 (Bending Oak Drive)	
Rockbridge	1.80	2.90	SR 631	Middle Road	SR 631 (Old Buena Vista Road)	
Rockingham	7.98	12.84	Bridgewater town limits	Oakwood Drive Cecil Wampler Road Osceola Springs Road Boyers Road Belts Road	SR 925 (Kezzletown Road)	Gap between US 33 and the Harrisonburg city limits
Scott	6.97	11.22	Tennessee state line	East Charles Valley Road Unnamed road Browders Chapel Road	SR 698 (Timbertree Branch Road)	
Shenandoah	0.20	0.32	Dead End	Riles Run Lane	SR 703 (Jerome Road)	
Spotsylvania	1.05	1.69	SR 605 (Marye Road)	Hadamar Road	Dead End	
Stafford	0.16	0.26	US 17 (Warrenton Road)	Burton Loop	US 17 (Warrenton Road)	
Tazewell	0.50	0.80	SR 602 (Pleasant Hill Church Road)	Kiser Road	Dead End	
Washington	1.10	1.77	US 11 (Lee Highway)	Enterprise Road	SR 609 (Hillman Highway)	
Wise	1.61	2.59	Dead End	Unnamed road	SR 646 (Coeburn Mountain Road)	Gap between segments ending at different points along SR 706
York	2.09	3.36	US 17 (George Washington Memorial Highway)	Cook Road	SR 238 (Goosley Road)	
