= Virginia State Route 714 =

Secondary route designation

State Route 714

Route information
- Maintained by VDOT

Location
- Country: United States
- State: Virginia

Highway system
- Virginia Routes; Interstate; US; Primary; Secondary; Byways; History; HOT lanes

State Route 714 (SR 714) in the U.S. state of Virginia is a secondary route designation applied to multiple discontinuous road segments among the many counties. The list below describes the sections in each county that are designated SR 714.

== List ==
County	Length (mi)	Length (km)	From	Via	To	Notes
Accomack	0.80	1.29	SR 712 (Sign Post Road)	Silverthorne Road	Maryland state line	
Albemarle	1.00	1.61	SR 715 (Esmont Road)	Riding Club Road	SR 20 (Scottsville Road)	
Alleghany	0.12	0.19	Dead End	Woodbrook Drive	Dead End	
Amherst	0.60	0.97	SR 615 (Sardis Road)	Tudor Hall Drive	US 60 (Lexington Turnpike)	
Augusta	0.39	0.63	Staunton city limits	Shutterlee Mill Road	SR 742 (Shutterlee Mill Lane)	
Bedford	11.82	19.02	Bedford town limits	Falling Creek Road	SR 24 (Glenwood Drive/Wyatts Way)	
Botetourt	0.70	1.13	SR 620 (Middle Creek Road)	Inn Road	Dead End	
Campbell	1.71	2.75	Altavista town limits	Lynch Mill Road	SR 626 (Goodman Crossing Road)	
Carroll	2.80	4.51	US 58 (Carrollton Pike)	Old Galax Pike	SR 1020 (West Grayson Street)	
Chesterfield	3.41	5.49	US 60 (Midlothian Turnpike)	Winterfield Road	Powhatan County line	
Dinwiddie	0.46	0.74	US 1 (Boydton Plank Road)	Lewis Road	Dead End	
Fairfax	0.68	1.09	SR 7 (Leesburg Pike)	Glen Carlyn Road	Arlington County line	
Fauquier	0.70	1.13	SR 713 (Atoka Road)	Goose Creek Road	Dead End	
Franklin	1.17	1.88	Dead End	Washboard Road	SR 705 (Chestnut Hill Road)	
Frederick	0.90	1.45	Shenandoah County line	Creek Lane	SR 604 (Gravel Springs Road)	
Halifax	1.30	2.09	North Carolina state line	Woodsdale Road	SR 711 (Harmony Road)	
Hanover	1.70	2.74	SR 664 (Gun Barrell Road)	Mabelton Road	Dead End	
Henry	1.09	1.75	SR 108	College Drive	SR 108 (Figsboro Road)	
James City	0.06	0.10	SR 713 (Hermitage Road)	Surry Drive	SR 712 (Ferncliff Drive)	
Loudoun	1.30	2.09	SR 716 (Edgegrove Road)	Shannondale Road	Dead End	
Louisa	2.37	3.81	SR 604 (Roundabout Road)	Horseshoe Farm Road	SR 208 (Courthouse Road)	
Mecklenburg	0.40	0.64	North Carolina state line	Oine Road	SR 712 (Palmer Springs Road)	
Montgomery	0.20	0.32	SR 622 (Flatwoods Road)	Acre of Rocks Road	Dead End	
Pittsylvania	3.70	5.95	SR 713 (Birch Creek Road)	Brumfield Road Richardson Lane	Dead End	Gap between segments ending at different points along SR 360
Prince William	0.60	0.97	Dead End	Izaak Walton Drive	SR 619 (Bristow Road)	
Pulaski	0.12	0.19	SR 703 (Ridge Road)	North Drive	SR 703 (Ridge Road)/SR 716 (South Drive)	
Roanoke	0.40	0.64	Dead End	Gum Springs Road	SR 619 (Wildwood Road)	
Rockbridge	3.20	5.15	US 11 (Lee Highway)	Mackey Lane Unnamed road	SR 608	Gap between segments ending at different points along SR 706
Rockingham	0.27	0.43	SR 613 (Clover Hill Road)	Lilly Square	SR 613 (Clover Hill Road)	
Scott	2.46	3.96	Tennessee state line	Unnamed road Warm Springs Road	SR 614 (Yuma Road)	
Shenandoah	5.28	8.50	Frederick County line	Turkey Run Road	SR 606 (Gap Road)	Gap between SR 55 and SR 623
Spotsylvania	0.70	1.13	Dead End	Cloverdale Street	SR 625 (Ashby Drive)	
Stafford	0.16	0.26	SR 713 (Federal Drive)	Windsor Circle	SR 715 (Duke Avenue)	
Tazewell	0.19	0.31	Dead End	Lee Street	SR 644 (Abbs Valley Road)	
Washington	6.53	10.51	SR 731 (Bucks Bridge Road)	South Fork River Road Prices Bridge Road	Dead End	
Wise	0.30	0.48	SR 671 (South Fork Road)	Unnamed road	Dead End	
York	0.30	0.48	SR 619 (Anchor Drive/Ship Point Road)	Jennings Drive	Dead End	
