= Virginia State Route 705 =

Secondary route designation

State Route 705

Route information
- Maintained by VDOT

Location
- Country: United States
- State: Virginia

Highway system
- Virginia Routes; Interstate; US; Primary; Secondary; Byways; History; HOT lanes

State Route 705 (SR 705) in the U.S. state of Virginia is a secondary route designation applied to multiple discontinuous road segments among the many counties. The list below describes the sections in each county that are designated SR 705.

== List ==
County	Length (mi)	Length (km)	From	Via	To	Notes
Accomack	6.03	9.70	SR 703 (Withams Road)	Holland Road	Maryland state line	
Albemarle	0.35	0.56	Cul-de-Sac	Fieldcrest Drive	SR 20 (Scottsville Road)	
Alleghany	0.20	0.32	Dead End	Meadowdale Road	SR 42/SR 646	
Amherst	0.45	0.72	SR 130 (Elon Road)	Mount Sinai Road	SR 130 (Elon Road)	
Augusta	3.80	6.12	SR 707 (Trimbles Mill Road)	North Mountain Road Scott Christian Road	SR 703 (Hewitt Road)	
Bedford	2.30	3.70	SR 668 (Goode Road)	Terrace View Road	SR 643 (Bellevue Road)	
Botetourt	1.88	3.03	SR 615 (Craig Creek Road)	Reid Road News Road Tucker Farm Road	Dead End	
Campbell	6.60	10.62	SR 696 (Hells Bend Road)	Covered Bridge Road	SR 761 (Long Island Road)	
Carroll	2.74	4.41	SR 743 (Airport Road)	Coon Ridge Road	US 52 (Poplar Camp Road)	
Chesterfield	0.13	0.21	SR 616 (Osborne Road)	Elokomin Avenue	SR 1544 (Buena Vista Boulevard)	
Dinwiddie	1.42	2.29	SR 688 (Sawmill Road)	Fox Branch Road	SR 733 (Little Zion Road)	
Fairfax	0.80	1.29	US 29 (Lee Highway)	West Street	Falls Church city limits	
Fauquier	5.40	8.69	SR 626 (Halfway Road)	Herringdon Road Burrland Lane Burrland Road Burrland Lane	SR 626 (Halfway Road)	Gap between SR 704 and SR 702
Franklin	5.40	8.69	SR 674 (Doe Run Road)	Chestnut Hill Road Redwood Road	Dead End	
Frederick	4.50	7.24	SR 703 (Whitacre Road)	Ebenezer Church Road	US 522 (Frederick Pike)	
Halifax	2.40	3.86	SR 706 (Bold Springs Road)	Link Puryear Road	SR 704 (Old Cluster Springs Road)	
Hanover	0.20	0.32	Dead End	Orchard Lane	US 360 (Mechanicsville Turnpike)	
Henry	0.24	0.39	SR 57 (Chatham Road)	Rob Lee Road	SR 57 (Chatham Road)	
James City	0.29	0.47	New Kent County line	Richardson Road	SR 601 (Barnes Road)	
Loudoun	6.20	9.98	US 15 (James Madison Highway)	Braddock Road Lightridge Farm Road Lightridge Road	Prince William County line	
Mecklenburg	4.30	6.92	Dead End	Taylor Ferry Road	SR 756 (Jefferson Street)	
Montgomery	1.95	3.14	SR 114 (Peppers Ferry Boulevard)	Coal Hollow Road	SR 685 (Prices Fork Road)	
Pittsylvania	0.60	0.97	SR 605 (Toshes Road)	Throughway Road	SR 799 (Climax Road)	
Prince William	7.91	12.73	SR 622 (Groveton Road)	Pageland Road Sanders Lane	Loudoun County line	Gap between segments ending at different points along SR 234
Pulaski	0.04	0.06	SR 622 (Dudley Ferry Road)	Long Way	Dead End	
Roanoke	1.00	1.61	SR 1112/Salem city limits	Red Lane Extension	Dead End	
Rockbridge	5.36	8.63	SR 631 (Old Buena Vista Road)	Mountain View Road	Dead End	
Rockingham	0.52	0.84	SR 988 (Early Road)	Cottontail Trail	SR 704 (Cecil Wampler Road)	
Scott	0.74	1.19	Tennessee state line	Unnamed road	SR 704	
Shenandoah	1.80	2.90	SR 703 (Jerome Road)	Buggy Ridge Road	SR 691 (Judge Rye Road)	
Spotsylvania	0.50	0.80	Dead End	Jennings Lane	SR 608 (Robert E Lee Drive)	
Stafford	0.40	0.64	US 17 (Warrenton Road)	Hartwood Church Road	US 17 (Warrenton Road)	
Tazewell	0.60	0.97	US 19	Drews Lane	SR 719 (Claypool Hill Mall Road)	
Washington	1.93	3.11	SR 706 (Rivermont Road)	Honey Locust Road	SR 677 (Watauga Road)	
Wise	0.58	0.93	Dead End	Unnamed road	SR 671 (Flat Gap Road)	
York	0.68	1.09	SR 641 (Penniman Road)	Alexander Lee Parkway	SR 641 (Penniman Road)	
