= Virginia State Route 750 =

Secondary route designation

State Route 750

Route information
- Maintained by VDOT

Location
- Country: United States
- State: Virginia

Highway system
- Virginia Routes; Interstate; US; Primary; Secondary; Byways; History; HOT lanes

State Route 750 (SR 750) in the U.S. state of Virginia is a secondary route designation applied to multiple discontinuous road segments among the many counties. The list below describes the sections in each county that are designated SR 750.

== List ==
County	Length (mi)	Length (km)	From	Via	To	Notes
Accomack	0.10	0.16	SR 606 (Harbor Point Road)	Radcliff Road	Dead End	
Albemarle	1.23	1.98	Nelson County line	Old Turnpike Road	US 250 (Rockfish Gap Turnpike)	
Amherst	0.82	1.32	SR 604 (Coolwell Drive)	Hico Drive	Dead End	
Augusta	2.82	4.54	US 11 (Lee Highway)	Keezletown Road	SR 256 (Weyers Cave Road)	
Bedford	3.50	5.63	Cul-de-Sac	Hales Ford Road	SR 655 (Diamond Hill Road)	
Botetourt	0.43	0.69	Dead End	Cherrywood Lane Cherry Tree Bottom	SR 43 (Narrow Passage Road)	
Campbell	0.80	1.29	US 29 (Wards Road)	Nickland Drive	Dead End	
Carroll	5.81	9.35	SR 637 (Greenbriar Road/High Ridge Road)	Quick Road Quick Drive Harvest Road Homestead Road	SR 753 (Double Cabin Road)	Gap between segments ending at different points along SR 100
Chesterfield	0.70	1.13	SR 145 (Centralia Road)	Shiloh Drive	SR 2847 (Chesswood Drive)	
Dinwiddie	1.51	2.43	SR 623 (Southerland Road)	Oxford Road	Dead End	
Fairfax	0.75	1.21	US 50/SR 4851	Rugby Road	SR 6985 (Ox Trail)	
Fauquier	1.50	2.41	SR 709 (Belvoir Road)	Harrison Road	SR 245 (Tavern Road)	
Franklin	2.81	4.52	SR 640 (Five Mile Mountain Road)	Starlight Road	SR 752 (Sawmill Road)	
Frederick	0.55	0.89	SR 751 (Gore Road)	Lucas Lane	Dead End	
Halifax	0.90	1.45	SR 360 (Bethel Road)	Long Branch Lane	Dead End	
Hanover	1.30	2.09	SR 651 (Georgetown Road)	Chestnut Church Road	Dead End	
Henry	3.79	6.10	SR 87 (Morehead Avenue)	Old Leaksville Road	SR 87 (Morehead Road)	
James City	0.25	0.40	Dead End	Wickre Street	York County line	
Loudoun	1.40	2.25	SR 9 (Charles Town Pike)	Heskett Lane	Dead End	
Louisa	0.72	1.16	FR-191 (Crew Road)	Lands End Road	Dead End	
Mecklenburg	1.90	3.06	US 58	Buffalo Road 8th Street	Caroline Street	
Montgomery	0.25	0.40	SR 114 (Peppers Ferry Boulevard)	Unnamed road	Dead End	
Pittsylvania	29.33	47.20	Danville city limits	Mount Cross Road Whitmell School Road Strawberry Road Green Pond Road Oxford Road	SR 785 (Lark Road)	Gap between segments ending at different points along SR 41 Gap between segments ending at different points along SR 649
Prince William	0.28	0.45	US 1 (Jefferson Davis Highway)	Woodside Drive	SR 638 (Colchester Road)	
Pulaski	0.43	0.69	Dead End	Kayoulah Lane	SR 607	
Rockbridge	0.70	1.13	Dead End	Unnamed road	SR 645 (Valley Pike)	
Rockingham	3.40	5.47	SR 731 (Community Center Road)	Nazarene Church Road	SR 613 (Spring Creek Road)	
Scott	0.10	0.16	SR 704 (East Charles Valley Road)	Unnamed road	Dead End	
Shenandoah	0.46	0.74	Dead End	Indian Run Lane	SR 623 (Back Road)	
Spotsylvania	0.30	0.48	SR 636 (Mine Road)	Lee Drive	Battlefield Road	
Stafford	0.62	1.00	US 17 (Warrenton Road)	Fleet Road	US 17 (Warrenton Road)	
Tazewell	0.13	0.21	Dead End	Rodeo Road	SR 67 (Raven Road)	
Washington	5.10	8.21	SR 609 (Hillman Highway)	Old Mill Road	SR 745 (Old Saltworks Road)	
Wise	0.73	1.17	Big Stone Gap town limits	Unnamed road	Dead End	
York	0.45	0.72	SR 620 (Link Road)	Railway Road	Dead End	
