= Virginia State Route 708 =

Secondary route designation

State Route 708

Route information
- Maintained by VDOT

Location
- Country: United States
- State: Virginia

Highway system
- Virginia Routes; Interstate; US; Primary; Secondary; Byways; History; HOT lanes

State Route 708 (SR 708) in the U.S. state of Virginia is a secondary route designation applied to multiple discontinuous road segments among the many counties. The list below describes the sections in each county that are designated SR 708.

== List ==
County	Length (mi)	Length (km)	From	Via	To	Notes
Accomack	2.70	4.35	SR 709 (Pitts Creek Road)	Miles Road	SR 709 (Pitts Creek Road)	
Albemarle	19.73	31.75	SR 738 (Morgantown Road)	Dry Bridge Road Taylors Gap Road Red Hill Road Secretary Road	SR 620 (Rolling Road)	Gap between SR 20 and SR 627
Alleghany	0.37	0.60	Dead End	McAllister Drive	SR 625 (East Dolly Ann Drive)	
Amherst	0.50	0.80	SR 739 (Honey Bee Drive)	Boxwood Farm Road	SR 610 (Boxwood Farm Road)	
Augusta	4.10	6.60	SR 876 (Cattleman Road)	Glebe School Road Eidson Creek Road Miss Phillips Road	SR 254 (Parkersburg Turnpike)	Gap between segments ending at different points along SR 703
Bedford	1.80	2.90	Dead End	Pisgah Road	US 460 (Lynchburg Salem Turnpike)	
Botetourt	0.30	0.48	Dead End	Fennel Road	SR 608 (Indian Rock Road)	
Campbell	1.50	2.41	Dead End	Seamster Drive	SR 648 (Suck Creek Road)	
Carroll	2.85	4.59	Dead End	Raiders Road Breezy Ridge Road	SR 701 (Joy Ranch Road)	
Chesterfield	1.00	1.61	Dead End	Carver Heights Drive	SR 681 (Branders Bridge Road)	
Dinwiddie	6.93	11.15	Amelia County line	Namozine Road	US 460/SR 631	
Fairfax	1.27	2.04	SR 649 (Annandale Road)	Kerns Road Lily Dhu Lane	Dead End	
Fauquier	2.30	3.70	SR 716 (Five Points Road)	Young Road Zulla Road Lambdon Road	SR 705 (Burrland Road)	Gap between segments ending at different points along SR 709
Franklin	1.12	1.80	Dead End	Adamperry Road Gogginsville Road	SR 641 (Callaway Road)	
Frederick	0.71	1.14	SR 259 (Carpers Pike)	Gold Orchard Road	Dead End	
Halifax	3.88	6.24	SR 658 (Cluster Springs Road)	Cedar Grove Road	US 58 (Philpott Road)	
Hanover	1.75	2.82	SR 714 (Mabelton Road)	Pleasant Mill Road	SR 631 (Old Ridge Road)	
Henry	0.46	0.74	SR 681 (John Baker Road)	Hardin Road	Dead End	
James City	0.13	0.21	Cul-de-Sac	Selby Lane	York County line	
Loudoun	0.23	0.37	SR 709 (Ivandale Road)	Maryland Avenue	SR 1102 (Laycock Street)	
Louisa	1.10	1.77	SR 604 (Roundabout Road)	Nannie Burton Road	Dead End	
Mecklenburg	1.60	2.57	SR 4 (Buggs Island Road)	Iron Mill Road	SR 669 (Baskerville Road)	
Montgomery	4.70	7.56	SR 625 (Big Falls Road)	Norris Run Road	Dead End	
Pittsylvania	0.92	1.48	US 58	Long Circle	US 58	
Prince George	0.60	0.97	SR 646 (Sandy Ridge Road)	Deep Bottom Drive	Dead End	
Prince William	1.90	3.06	SR 652 (Fitzwater Drive)	Lonesome Road	SR 658 (Owls Nest Road)	
Pulaski	1.00	1.61	SR 693 (Julia Simpkins Road)	Bethel Church Road	Dead End	
Roanoke	1.44	2.32	US 221 (Bent Mountain Road)	Ivy Ridge Road Lancaster Road	SR 690 (Fortune Ridge Road)	
Rockbridge	2.69	4.33	SR 608	Unnamed road	SR 130 (Wert Faulkner Highway)	
Rockingham	9.80	15.77	SR 253 (Port Republic Road)	Goods Mill Road Lynnwood Road Ore Bank Road	SR 663 (Browns Gap Road)	Gap between segments ending at different points along SR 655
Scott	0.82	1.32	SR 614	Unnamed road	SR 224 (Wadlow Gap Road)	
Shenandoah	3.61	5.81	SR 706 (Stout Road)	Unnamed road Bethel Church Road Unnamed road	Dead End	Gap between segments ending at different points along SR 614
Spotsylvania	0.18	0.29	SR 3 (Plank Road)	Bernstein Road	Dead End	
Stafford	0.15	0.24	SR 744 (Rumford Road)	Pollock Street	SR 680 (Leonard Street)	
Tazewell	0.06	0.10	Dead End	Ratliff Street	SR 644 (Abbs Valley Road)	
Washington	5.22	8.40	SR 91	Rhea Valley Road Bethel Road	US 58 (Jeb Stuart Highway)	
Wise	0.53	0.85	US 23	Moneyhun Road	Dead End	
York	0.21	0.34	SR 707 (Janis Drive)	Basta Drive	SR 631 (Waterview Road)	
