= Virginia State Route 706 =

Secondary route designation

State Route 706

Route information
- Maintained by VDOT

Location
- Country: United States
- State: Virginia

Highway system
- Virginia Routes; Interstate; US; Primary; Secondary; Byways; History; HOT lanes

State Route 706 (SR 706) in the U.S. state of Virginia is a secondary route designation applied to multiple discontinuous road segments among the many counties. The list below describes the sections in each county that are designated SR 706.

== List ==
County	Length (mi)	Length (km)	From	Via	To	Notes
Accomack	1.30	2.09	SR 693 (Neal Parker Drive)	Tunnells Mill Road	SR 705 (Holland Road)	
Albemarle	3.77	6.07	SR 708 (Red Hill Road)	Dudley Mountain Road	SR 631 (Old Lynchburg Road)	
Alleghany	0.97	1.56	Dead End	Montgomery Knob Road	SR 616 (Rich Patch Road)	
Amherst	0.28	0.45	SR 130 (Elon Road)	Crennel Drive	SR 130 (Elon Road)	
Augusta	0.90	1.45	SR 705 (Scott Christian Road/North Mountain Road)	North Mountain Road	SR 703 (Hewitt Road)	
Bedford	2.52	4.06	US 460 (Lynchburg Salem Turnpike)	Bells Mill Road	SR 668 (Goode Road)	
Botetourt	1.20	1.93	Dead End	Brahma Road	SR 705 (Tucker Farm Road)	
Campbell	0.50	0.80	Dead End	Perrows Road	SR 699 (Gladys Road)	
Carroll	3.31	5.33	SR 708 (Breezy Ridge Road)	Glade Creek Road Farmers Market Drive	US 58/SR 743	Gap between segments ending at different points along SR 701
Chesterfield	0.35	0.56	SR 144 (Harrowgate Road)	Tarris Lane	SR 619 (Happy Hill Road)	
Dinwiddie	0.70	1.13	SR 226 (Cox Road)	Old Cox Road	SR 226 (Cox Road)	
Fairfax	0.18	0.29	SR 4047 (Northfield Drive)	Bennett Drive	SR 244 (Columbia Pike)	
Fauquier	2.50	4.02	SR 709 (Zulla Road)	Muster Lane Coon Tree Road	SR 626 (Halfway Road)	Gap between segments ending at different points along SR 705
Franklin	0.80	1.29	SR 40 (Franklin Street)	Woodman Road	Dead End	
Frederick	0.35	0.56	Dead End	Opequon Church Lane	US 11 (Valley Pike)	
Halifax	5.10	8.21	SR 658 (Cluster Springs Road)	Bold Springs Road	SR 704 (Old Cluster Springs Road)	
Hanover	0.40	0.64	SR 738 (Old Ridge Road)	Fountain Road	Dead End	
Henry	1.60	2.57	US 58	Dye Plant Road Smith Lake Road	Martinsville city limits	
James City	0.68	1.09	End loop	Winston Drive	SR 31 (Jamestown Road)	
Loudoun	0.80	1.29	Dead End	Paynes Lane Irene Road	SR 800 (Meadowlark Drive)	Gap between segments ending at different points along SR 704
Louisa	0.30	0.48	SR 635 (Willow Brook Road/West Chapel Drive)	Turners Mill Road	Dead End	
Mecklenburg	0.25	0.40	SR 49	Pittard Lane	Dead End	
Montgomery	1.30	2.09	Dead End	Poplar Hollow Road	US 11/US 460	
Pittsylvania	7.28	11.72	SR 718 (Snakepath Road)	Game Reserve Road Abbott Place	SR 701 (Slatesville Road)	Gap between segments ending at different points along SR 640
Prince George	0.34	0.55	SR 642 (Beavercastle Road)	Marl Bank Drive	Dead End	
Prince William	1.43	2.30	SR 663 (Davis Ford Road)	Asdee Lane	SR 3340 (Greatbridge Lane)	
Pulaski	0.12	0.19	SR 707 (High Street)	Circle Drive	SR 1012 (Walker Avenue)	
Roanoke	0.69	1.11	Dead End	Elm View Road	SR 419 (Electric Road)	
Rockbridge	14.15	22.77	SR 631 (Old Buena Vista Road)	Borden Grant Trail Unnamed road Steeles Fort Road	SR 606 (Raphine Road)	
Rockingham	0.05	0.08	SR 778 (Brenneman Church Road)	Turners Mill Lane	Dead End	
Scott	7.70	12.39	SR 653	Osborne Ridge Road	Wise County line	
Shenandoah	2.79	4.49	SR 709 (Buck Hill Road)	Stout Road	SR 710	Gap between segments ending at different points along SR 707
Spotsylvania	0.65	1.05	SR 620 (Harrison Road)	Cherry Road	SR 610 (Old Plank Road)	
Stafford	0.53	0.85	US 17 (Warrenton Road)	Marsh Road	US 17 (Warrenton Road)	
Tazewell	0.22	0.35	Bluefield town limits	Unnamed road	Dead End	
Washington	4.38	7.05	US 58 (JEB Stuart Highway)	Rivermont Road	SR 803 (Cedar Creek Road)	
Wise	9.22	14.84	Scott County line	Unnamed road Tacoma Mountain Road	SR 646 (Coeburn Mountain Road)	
York	2.39	3.85	US 17 (George Washington Memorial Highway)	Theatre Road Yorktown Road Unnamed road	SR 606 (Calthrop Neck Road)	
