= Virginia State Route 753 =

Secondary route designation

State Route 753

Route information
- Maintained by VDOT

Location
- Country: United States
- State: Virginia

Highway system
- Virginia Routes; Interstate; US; Primary; Secondary; Byways; History; HOT lanes

State Route 753 (SR 753) in the U.S. state of Virginia is a secondary route designation applied to multiple discontinuous road segments among the many counties. The list below describes the sections in each county that are designated SR 753.

== List ==
County	Length (mi)	Length (km)	From	Via	To	Notes
Accomack	1.10	1.77	SR 676 (Dennis Drive)	Chandler Road	SR 680 (Berry Road)	
Albemarle	0.45	0.72	SR 715 (Esmont Road)	Paces Store Road Precinct Road	SR 627 (Porters Road)	Gap between segments ending at different points along SR 6
Amherst	0.80	1.29	SR 665 (Flat Woods Road)	Parr Town Road	Dead End	
Augusta	5.60	9.01	SR 42 (Scenic Highway)	Nash Road Glade School Road Naked Creek Hollow Road Slate Hill Road	SR 732 (Roman Road)	Gap between segments ending at different points along SR 613 Gap between segments ending at different points along SR 699
Bedford	1.90	3.06	SR 754 (Saunders Grove Drive)	Pilot Mountain Road	SR 684 (Rocky Ford Road)	
Botetourt	0.22	0.35	SR 841 (12th Street)	Spring Street 10th Street	US 220 (Botetourt Road)	
Carroll	9.70	15.61	SR 783 (Deer Ridge Road)	Double Cabin Road	US 221 (Floyd Pike)	
Chesterfield	0.21	0.34	SR 2406 (Bermuda Avenue)	Henrico Street	SR 904 (Point De Rock Road)	
Dinwiddie	0.40	0.64	SR 611 (Wilkinson Road)	Siding Drive	Dead End	
Fairfax	0.32	0.51	SR 798 (Turkey Run Road)	Turkey Run Road	Dead End	
Fauquier	0.10	0.16	Cul-de-Sac	Edwards Drive	SR 829 (Snow Mountain Road)	
Franklin	1.00	1.61	Dead End	Pine Spur Road	SR 830 (Mills Road)	
Frederick	0.20	0.32	Dead End	Rosenberger Lane	SR 600 (Back Mountain Road)	
Halifax	4.60	7.40	SR 667 (Leda Road)	Beulah Road	SR 57 (Chatham Road)	
Hanover	1.04	1.67	SR 826 (Springton Road)	Patrick Henry Boulevard	US 301/SR 2 (Chamberlayne Road)	
Henry	1.00	1.61	SR 57 (Fairystone Park Highway)	Carson Drive	Dead End	
James City	0.13	0.21	SR 143 (Merrimac Trail)	Orange Drive	York County line	
Loudoun	0.22	0.35	SR 734 (Snickersville Turnpike)	Railroad Street	Dead End	
Louisa	0.45	0.72	SR 630 (Harris Creek Road)	Sam Boyo Road	SR 208 (Courthouse Road)	
Mecklenburg	0.70	1.13	Dead End	Turtle Road	SR 642 (Rocky Branch Road)	
Montgomery	1.56	2.51	US 11/US 460 (Roanoke Road)	Old Town Road	US 11/US 460	
Pittsylvania	1.20	1.93	SR 642 (Shula Drive)	Jasper Wood Road	SR 988 (Highwayview Road)	
Prince William	0.13	0.21	SR 2808 (Pilgrims Inn Drive)	Ridgefield Village Drive	SR 642 (Hoadly Road)	
Pulaski	0.10	0.16	Dead End	Crockett Avenue	SR 673	
Roanoke	0.29	0.47	Dead End	Terminal Road	SR 904 (Starkey Road)	
Rockbridge	1.10	1.77	SR 674	Zollmans Mill Road	SR 610 (Plank Road)	
Rockingham	9.16	14.74	SR 613 (Turleytown Road)	Hollar School Road Wengers Mill Road Kratzer Road	Harrisonburg city limits	Gap between segments ending at different points along SR 752 Gap between segments ending at different points along SR 42
Scott	7.69	12.38	SR 603 (Canton Road)	Unnamed road	SR 600 (Fairview Road)	Gap between segments ending at different points along SR 638
Shenandoah	0.25	0.40	SR 1328 (Railroad Street)	Jackson Street	US 11 (Main Street)	
Spotsylvania	0.45	0.72	SR 615 (Rapidan Drive)	Rapidan Road	Dead End	
Stafford	1.99	3.20	US 1 (Jefferson Davis Highway)	Enon Road	SR 652 (Truslow Road)	
Tazewell	1.10	1.77	Dead End	Church House Hollow Road	SR 16 (Stoney Ridge Road)	
Washington	1.80	2.90	SR 751 (Fleet Road)	Washington Spring Road	SR 609 (Plum Creek Road/Blue Hill Road)	
Wise	0.25	0.40	SR 644 (Road)	Unnamed road	Dead End	
York	0.11	0.18	Cul-de-Sac	Glenn Circle	SR 752 (Sheppard Drive)	
