= Virginia State Route 752 =

Secondary route designation

State Route 752

Route information
- Maintained by VDOT

Location
- Country: United States
- State: Virginia

Highway system
- Virginia Routes; Interstate; US; Primary; Secondary; Byways; History; HOT lanes

State Route 752 (SR 752) in the U.S. state of Virginia is a secondary route designation applied to multiple discontinuous road segments among the many counties. The list below describes the sections in each county that are designated SR 752.

== List ==
County	Length (mi)	Length (km)	From	Via	To	Notes
Accomack	0.60	0.97	Dead End	Teackle Road	SR 614 (Craddock Neck Road)	
Albemarle	0.32	0.51	US 250 (Rockfish Gap Turnpike)	Mechums Depot Lane	US 250 (Rockfish Gap Turnpike)	
Amherst	0.70	1.13	SR 692 (Muddy Branch Road/Longbranch Drive)	Longbranch Road	Dead End	
Augusta	1.90	3.06	SR 753 (Slate Hill Road/Naked Creek Hollow Road)	Naked Creek Hollow Road	SR 646 (Fadley Road)	
Bedford	2.40	3.86	SR 652 (Walker Road)	Fontella Road	US 501 (Lee Jackson Highway)	
Botetourt	0.55	0.89	SR 648 (Reservoir Road)	Old Mill Drive	Dead End	
Campbell	0.80	1.29	Dead End	Mount Olivet Church Road	US 460 (Lynchburg Highway)	
Carroll	3.36	5.41	SR 783 (Deer Ridge Road)	Mitchells Crossroad	SR 751 (Windsong Road)	
Chesterfield	0.65	1.05	SR 36 (River Road)	Warren Avenue	Dead End	
Dinwiddie	0.40	0.64	SR 611/SR 751	Siding Drive	Dead End	
Fairfax	0.44	0.71	US 29 (Lee Highway)	Maple Lane	SR 700 (Hunter Road)	
Fauquier	4.00	6.44	SR 617 (Blackwells Mill Road)	Sillamon Road	SR 617 (Blackwells Mill Road)	
Franklin	3.75	6.04	SR 40/SR 781	Sawmill Road	SR 602 (Ferrum Mountain Road)	
Frederick	2.70	4.35	US 50 (Northwestern Pike)	Knob Road	SR 705 (Ebenezer Church Road)	
Halifax	1.10	1.77	Dead End	Ham Tuck Trail	SR 751 (Storys Creek Road)	
Hanover	0.19	0.31	Dead End	Russet Lane	SR 638 (Atlee Road)	
Henry	1.95	3.14	SR 781 (Chestnut Knob Road)	Cameron Road	US 58	
Loudoun	0.45	0.72	SR 698 (Wheatland Road)	Virts Lane	Dead End	
Louisa	1.00	1.61	Dead End	River Bend Drive	SR 610 (Holly Grove Drive)	
Mecklenburg	0.45	0.72	Dead End	Piercy Road	SR 629 (Reed Road)	
Montgomery	0.25	0.40	Dead End	Buckskin Road	SR 603 (Cedar Run Road)	
Pittsylvania	1.30	2.09	SR 751 (Grassland Drive)	Oliver Road	Dead End	
Prince William	0.19	0.31	SR 751 (Token Forest Drive)	Token Forest Court	Dead End	
Pulaski	0.18	0.29	Dead End	Reed Junction Road Unnamed road	SR 607	
Roanoke	2.64	4.25	US 221 (Bent Mountain Road)	Old Bent Mountain Road Old Mill Road	US 221 (Bent Mountain Road)	
Rockbridge	0.48	0.77	SR 681	Hunter Hill Road	US 11 (Lee Highway)	
Rockingham	22.23	35.78	SR 613 (Spring Creek Road)	Beaver Creek Road Silver Creek Road Crystal Ridge Road Keller Road Rushville Road Hinton Road Muddy Creek Road Snapps Creek Road Well Hollow Road Great Road Mount Zion Road Wengers Mill Road Cherry Grove Road Hisers Lane	SR 259 (Brocks Gap Road)	Gap between segments ending at different points along SR 743 Gap between segments ending at different points along SR 738 Gap between segments ending at different points along US 33 Gap between segments ending at different points along SR 763 Gap between segments ending at different points along SR 721
Scott	0.30	0.48	Dead End	Arrowhead Lane	SR 612	
Shenandoah	0.83	1.34	SR 688 (Helsley Road)	Frogtown Lane	Dead End	
Spotsylvania	0.49	0.79	SR 601 (Lawyers Road)	Fenton Road	SR 208 (Courthouse Road)	
Stafford	2.93	4.72	Dead End	Richards Ferry Road	US 17 (Warrenton Road)	
Tazewell	0.25	0.40	US 460	Clearview Road	US 460	
Washington	0.63	1.01	SR 609/SR 1309	Bedford Lane	SR 91 (Monte Vista Drive)	
Wise	0.78	1.26	Dead End	Unnamed road	SR 671 (North Fork Road)	
York	0.68	1.09	Cul-de-Sac	Sheppard Drive	SR 727 (Nelson Drive)	
