= Virginia State Route 623 =

State highway in Virginia, United States

State Route 623

Route information
- Maintained by VDOT

Location
- Country: United States
- State: Virginia

Highway system
- Virginia Routes; Interstate; US; Primary; Secondary; Byways; History; HOT lanes

State Route 623 (SR 623) in the U.S. state of Virginia is a secondary route designation applied to multiple discontinuous road segments among the many counties. The list below describes the sections in each county that are designated SR 623.

== List ==
County	Length (mi)	Length (km)	From	Via	To	Notes
Accomack	0.38	0.61	SR 620	Adams Crossing	SR 180/US 13 (Lankford Highway)	
Albemarle	1.40	2.25	Dead End	Woods Edge Road	SR 616 (Union Mill Road)	
Alleghany	2.20	3.54	Dead End	White Rock Gap Road	SR 616 (Rich Patch Road)	
Amelia	4.77	7.68	SR 708 (Namozine Road)	Chesdin Lake Drive	Dinwiddie County Line	
Appomattox	2.03	3.27	Dead End	Walkers Ford Road	SR 605 (Beckham Road)	
Augusta	1.10	1.77	Dead End	Back Creek Lane	SR 610 (Howardsville Turnpike)	
Bath	1.97	3.17	Dead End	Poor Farm Road	US 220 (Stuart Highway)	
Bedford	1.24	2.00	Campbell County Line	Turkey Foot Road	SR 811 (Thomas Jefferson Road)	
Bland	8.21	13.21	SR 622 (Foglesong Valley Road)	Red Oak Road Sharon Springs Road	Tazewell County Line	Formerly SR 78 Gap between segments ending at different points along SR 42
Botetourt	0.79	1.27	FR-55 (Lee Highway)	Overpass Road Buffalo Road	SR 622 (Alpine Road)	
Brunswick	11.63	18.72	Mecklenburg County Line	Go Cart Road Evans Creek Road Diamond Grove Road Browns Creek Road	SR 611 (Dry Bread Road)	Gap between segments ending at different points along SR 657 Gap between segments ending at different points along SR 644
Buchanan	3.60	5.79	SR 80	Council Mountain	SR 620	
Buckingham	3.35	5.39	SR 600 (Plank Road)	Chellowe Road Indian Gap Road	SR 632 (Ira Road)	
Campbell	4.00	6.44	SR 682	Town Fork Road Turkey Foot Road	Bedford County Line	Gap between segments ending at different points along SR 858
Caroline	1.10	1.77	SR 654 (Burkes Bridge Road)	Old Stage Road	SR 627 (Mattaponi Trail)	
Carroll	0.40	0.64	US 221 (Floyd Pike)	Borderline Road	SR 622 (Indian Valley Road)	
Charles City	10.03	16.14	SR 613 (Shady Point Road)	Wilcox Neck Road	Dead End	
Charlotte	8.84	14.23	SR 47 (Drakes Main Street)	West Point Stevens Road West Point Stephens Road Friendship Church Road	Lunenburg County Line	
Chesterfield	0.89	1.43	SR 655 (Beach Road)	Dry Creek Road	Cul-de-Sac	
Clarke	0.20	0.32	US 340 (Lord Fairfax Highway)	Gaylord Road	US 340 (Lord Fairfax Highway)	Gap between dead ends
Craig	1.00	1.61	SR 624	Unnamed road	SR 645	
Culpeper	3.00	4.83	SR 621 (Jeffersonton Road)	Myers Mill Road	SR 802 (Springs Road)	
Cumberland	4.77	7.68	SR 622 (Bear Creek Lake Road)	Quarry Road Sugar Fork Road	SR 622 (Bear Creek Lake Road)	
Dickenson	1.17	1.88	Dead End	Unnamed road	SR 624 (Camp Creek Road)	
Dinwiddie	7.00	11.27	Amelia County Line	Sutherland Road Station Road	US 460 (Cox Road)	
Essex	3.10	4.99	King and Queen County Line	Beulah Church Road	SR 622 (Latanes Mill Road)	
Fairfax	4.56	7.34	SR 624 (Lukens Lane)	Old Mill Road Ferry Landing Road Old Mount Vernon Road	SR 235 (Mount Vernon Highway)	
Fauquier	8.80	14.16	Dead End	Jacksontown Road Crooked Run Road Rokeby Road Willisville Road	Loudoun County Line	Gap between segments ending at different points along US 17 Gap between segments ending at different points along SR 710
Floyd	1.70	2.74	Carroll County Line	Borderline Road	Carroll County Line	
Fluvanna	2.30	3.70	SR 659 (Kents Store Way)	Perkins Road	SR 653 (Three Chopt Road)	
Franklin	8.59	13.82	Patrick County Line	Fairy Stone Park Road Ingramville Road Timberline Road Union Road	SR 864 (Old Ferrum Road)	Gap between segments ending at different points along SR 605
Frederick	0.80	1.29	Shenandoah County Line	Fromans Road	SR 622 (Cedar Creek Grade)	
Giles	9.63	15.50	SR 663 (Green Valley Road)	Rye Hollow Road Rocky Hollow Road River Road Cascade Drive	Dead End	Gap between segments ending at different points along SR 622 Gap between segments ending at different points along SR 1404
Gloucester	6.45	10.38	SR 625 (Ditchley Drive)	Ware Neck Road	SR 3 (John Clayton Memorial Highway)	Gap between segments ending at different points along SR 625
Goochland	8.69	13.99	SR 6 (Patterson Avenue/River Road)	Hockett Road Ashland Road	Hanover County Line	Gap between segments ending at different points along US 250
Grayson	4.44	7.15	SR 622 (Delhart Road)	Greenwich Road Union Road Beech Grove Lane	SR 636 (Rock Chimney Road)	Gap between segments ending at different points along SR 626
Greene	2.90	4.67	SR 633 (Amicus Road)	Swift Run Road	US 33/US 33 Bus (Spotswood Trail)	
Greensville	1.90	3.06	US 58 (Courtland Road)	Unnamed road	SR 611 (Brick Yard Road)	
Halifax	8.18	13.16	SR 603 (Hunting Creek Road)	Mortons Ferry Road	Dead End	
Hanover	12.08	19.44	Goochland County Line	Ashland Road Cedar Lane Telegraph Road	SR 835 (King Acres Drive)	Gap between US 1 and a Cul-de-Sac
Henry	3.88	6.24	SR 57 (Chatham Road)	Deer Haven Drive	Pittsylvania County Line	
Highland	0.90	1.45	Dead End	Unnamed road	SR 622	
Isle of Wight	4.10	6.60	Surry County Line	White Hill Trail Green Level Road	SR 683 (Dews Plantation Road)	Gap between segments ending at different points along SR 621
James City	0.09	0.14	Dead End	Maupin Place	York County Line	
King and Queen	7.45	11.99	SR 721 (Newtown Road)	Indian Neck Road	Essex County Line	Gap between segments ending at different points along SR 635
King George	2.70	4.35	US 301 (James Madison Parkway)	Jersey Road	SR 647 (Shiloh Loop)	
King William	2.00	3.22	SR 633 (Powhatan Trail)	Union Hope Road	SR 632 (Mount Olive-Cohoke Road)	
Lancaster	0.87	1.40	SR 622 (Morattico Road)	Ivey Creek Road Hale Drive	Dead End	
Lee	1.59	2.56	SR 624 (Rawhide Loop)	Mohawk Loop	SR 606	
Loudoun	4.57	7.35	Fauquier County Line	Willisville Road	SR 626 (Bloomfield Road)	
Louisa	4.64	7.47	SR 22/SR 208	Chopping Road	US 522/SR 208	
Lunenburg	4.41	7.10	SR 695 (Eubank Road)	Plantersville Road	SR 630 (Fort Mitchell Drive)	
Madison	0.70	1.13	SR 622 (Tanners Road)	Mount Pisgah Church Road	Dead End	
Mathews	1.26	2.03	Dead End	Thurston Road Greene Road Magnolia Road	SR 622 (Long Road)	Gap between dead ends Gap between segments ending at different points along SR 622
Mecklenburg	2.99	4.81	SR 621 (Country Club Road)	Wray Road	Brunswick County Line	
Middlesex	1.49	2.40	SR 624 (Regent Road)	Regent Road	Dead End	
Montgomery	1.15	1.85	Dead End	Whitethorne Road Hibiscus Lane	SR 652 (McCoy Road)	
Nelson	10.61	17.08	SR 151 (Patrick Henry Highway)	Shields Gap Road Davis Creek Road Myndus Road Stage Bridge Road	SR 617 (Rockfish River Road)	
New Kent	7.40	11.91	SR 249 (New Kent Highway)	Cocksmill Road Pamunkey Church Road	SR 249 (New Kent Highway)	
Northampton	1.10	1.77	Dead End	Harmontown Road	SR 622 (Bayside Road)	
Northumberland	1.50	2.41	SR 624 (Lewisetta Road)	Melrose Road	Dead End	
Nottoway	0.06	0.10	SR 716 (Namozine Street)	Atwood Street	Dead End	
Orange	1.00	1.61	SR 20 (Constitution Highway)	Louisianna Road	Dead End	
Page	0.60	0.97	SR 622 (Park Road)	Judy Lane	US 340	
Patrick	5.10	8.21	SR 346 (Fairy Stone Park)	Union Bridge Road	Franklin County Line	
Pittsylvania	1.08	1.74	SR 57 (Callands Road)	Deer Haven Drive	Henry County Line	
Powhatan	2.17	3.49	Dead End	Worsham Road	SR 609 (Giles Bridge Road)	
Prince Edward	3.85	6.20	SR 696 (Green Bay Road)	Twin Bridges Road	Dead End	
Prince George	3.27	5.26	Sussex County Line	Rowanty Road	US 301 (Crater Road)	
Prince William	1.20	1.93	SR 676 (Catharpin Road)	Thornton Drive	SR 705 (Pageland Lane)	
Pulaski	2.00	3.22	SR 600 (Belspring Road)	Gate Ten Road	Dead End	
Rappahannock	0.50	0.80	SR 614 (Keyser Run Road)	Pullens Bluff Road	SR 622 (Gidbrown Hollow Road)	
Richmond	1.28	2.06	SR 624 (Newland Road)	Finchs Hill Road	Westmoreland County Line	
Roanoke	1.81	2.91	SR 625 (Hershberger Road)	Florist Road Dent Road	Roanoke City Limits	
Rockbridge	6.23	10.03	US 60	Fredericksburg Road	SR 39 (Maury River Road)	
Rockingham	4.25	6.84	Elkton Town Line	Mount Pleasant Road	SR 625 (Thoroughfare Road)	
Russell	0.90	1.45	SR 622 (Miller Creek Road)	Bostic Hollow	Dead End	
Scott	3.47	5.58	SR 603 (Canton Road)	Unnamed road	SR 621	Gap between segments ending at different points along SR 600
Shenandoah	24.97	40.19	SR 675 (Wolf Gap Road)	Back Road Unnamed road Back Road	Frederick County Line	
Smyth	0.60	0.97	SR 42 (Old Wilderness Road)	Sprouts Creek Road	Dead End	
Southampton	4.10	6.60	SR 626 (Appleton Road)	Clayton Road Britt Road	SR 635 (OBerry Church Road)	Gap between segments ending at different points along SR 600
Spotsylvania	0.90	1.45	SR 613 (Brock Road)	Stewart Road	SR 612 (Catharpin Road)	
Stafford	0.80	1.29	SR 627 (Forbes Street)	Harrell Road	SR 1027 (Woodlawn Drive)	
Surry	1.00	1.61	Isle of Wight County Line	Mill Swamp Road	SR 622 (Runnymeade Road)	
Sussex	0.70	1.13	SR 602 (Cabin Point Road)	Rowanty Road	Prince George County Line	
Tazewell	12.10	19.47	Bland County Line	Burkes Garden Road	SR 61 (Clearfork Road)	Formerly SR 78
Warren	2.10	3.38	Dead End	Downing Farm Road	SR 673 (McCoys Ford Road)	
Washington	0.50	0.80	SR 614 (Barnrock Road)	Wooten Gap	SR 802 (Mendota Road)	
Westmoreland	0.61	0.98	Richmond County Line	Finchs Hill Road	SR 3 (Kings Highway)	
Wise	2.50	4.02	SR 621	Unnamed road Powell River Road	SR 620 (Guest River Road)	Gap between segments ending at different points along SR 610
Wythe	0.20	0.32	Dead End	Orphanage Drive	SR 608	
York	0.60	0.97	Dead End	Wildey Road	SR 622 (Seaford Road)	
