= Virginia State Route 624 =

State highway in Virginia, United States

State Route 624

Route information
- Maintained by VDOT

Location
- Country: United States
- State: Virginia

Highway system
- Virginia Routes; Interstate; US; Primary; Secondary; Byways; History; HOT lanes

State Route 624 (SR 624) in the U.S. state of Virginia is a secondary route designation applied to multiple discontinuous road segments among the many counties. The list below describes the sections in each county that are designated SR 624.

== List ==
County	Length (mi)	Length (km)	From	Via	To	Notes
Accomack	3.58	5.76	SR 639 (Phillips Drive)	Mapp Road Pickpenny Road Willis Street Bunting Point Road	Dead End	Gap between segments ending at different points along SR 600 Gap between segments ending at different points along SR 605
Albemarle	0.15	0.24	Dead End	Headquarter Lane	SR 629 (Browns Gap Turnpike)	
Alleghany	0.05	0.08	Dead End	Rosedale Avenue	SR 654	
Amelia	2.30	3.70	SR 656 (Amelia Avenue)	Whitaker Road	SR 614 (Dennisville Road)	
Amherst	10.64	17.12	SR 661 (Stage Road)	Sweet Briar Lane Higginbotham Creek Road Earley Farm Road Bateau Lane	Dead End	Gap between segments ending at different points along SR 661 Gap between segments ending at different points along SR 604 Gap between segments ending at different points along SR 622
Appomattox	0.50	0.80	Dead End	River Bottom Lane	SR 605 (Dreaming Creek Road)	
Augusta	4.23	6.81	SR 634 (China Clay Road)	Lyndhurst Road Lyndhurst Station Road Mount Torrey Road	Waynesboro City Limits	Gap between segments ending at different points along SR 664
Bath	5.50	8.85	SR 609 Dry Run	Westminster	SR 625 (River Road)	
Bedford	1.78	2.86	SR 644 (Coffee Road)	Indered Farm Road	SR 658 (Walnut Hollow Road)	
Bland	1.00	1.61	Dead End	Ravens Cliff Road	SR 622 (Foglesong Valley Road/Birch Grove Road)	
Botetourt	0.90	1.45	Dead End	Stinnett Road	SR 614 (Arcadia Road)	
Brunswick	0.70	1.13	Mecklenburg County Line	Canaan Road	SR 659 (Brodnax Road)	
Buchanan	11.77	18.94	Russell County Line	Garden Creek Road Dales road Garden Creek Road Kennel Gap Road	SR 330 (Keen Mountain Correctional Center Road)	Gap between segments ending at different points along US 460
Buckingham	0.70	1.13	SR 626 (Clay Bank Road)	Cata Road	Dead End	
Campbell	2.30	3.70	Dead End	Timberlake Drive	US 460 Bus	
Caroline	0.33	0.53	King and Queen County Line	Tignor Road	SR 630 (Sparta Road)	
Carroll	3.50	5.63	Dead End	Soap Ridge Road Nester School Road	SR 638 (Dugspur Road)	
Charles City	3.10	4.99	SR 615 (Glebe Lane)	Horseshoe Road	SR 615 (Glebe Lane)	
Charlotte	1.00	1.61	SR 92/SR 631	Morgan Road	US 15 (Barnesville Highway)	
Chesterfield	1.23	1.98	SR 1385 (Queensgate Road)	Walton Park Road	SR 668 (Woolridge Road)	
Clarke	4.06	6.53	Warren County Line	Red Gate Road	US 50 (Millwood Pike)	
Craig	13.18	21.21	SR 42	Little Mountain Road	SR 42	
Culpeper	5.28	8.50	SR 626 (Black Hill Road)	Sheads Mountain Road Oak Shade Road	SR 625 (Ryland Chapel Road)	Gap between segments ending at different points along SR 229
Cumberland	8.00	12.87	SR 45 (Cartersville Road)	Jenkins Church Road Sugarfork Road	SR 623 (Sugar Fork Road/Quarry Road)	
Dickenson	4.82	7.76	SR 83 (Dickenson Highway)	Camp Creek Road Camp Jacob Road Unnamed road	SR 630	
Dinwiddie	12.40	19.96	SR 645 (Wheelers Pond Road)	Coleman Lake Road	SR 611 (Wilinson Road)	Gap between segments ending at different points along SR 613
Essex	4.67	7.52	SR 631 (Lloyds Road)	Essex Church Road Old Courthouse Road	US 17 (Tidewater Trail)	
Fairfax	2.00	3.22	SR 622 (Pole Lane)	Highland Lane Lukens Lane Old Mill Road	SR 623 (Old Mount Vernon Road)	Gap between segments ending at different points along US 1
Fauquier	6.44	10.36	Dead End	Lost Corner Road Crenshaw Road	US 50 (John S. Mosby Highway)	Gap between SR 713 and SR 710
Floyd	6.41	10.32	SR 761 (Sugar Tree Road)	Reece Road Shady Grove Road	SR 622 (Indian Valley Post Office Road)	
Fluvanna	4.23	6.81	Dead End	Point of Fork Road Gale Hill Road Holmhead Circle Gravel Hill Road Red Bank Lane	Dead End	
Franklin	1.10	1.77	Dead End	Twin Ridge Marina Road	SR 798 (Knob Church Road)	
Frederick	1.10	1.77	Dead End	Meadow Mills Road	SR 625 (Veterans Road)	
Giles	0.50	0.80	SR 623 (Cascade Drive)	Red Hill Road	Dead End	
Gloucester	0.60	0.97	SR 623 (Ware Neck Road)	Griffen Road	Dead End	
Goochland	0.35	0.56	Dead End	Vinita Road	SR 650 (River Road)	
Grayson	4.98	8.01	North Carolina State Line	Delhart Road Crossroads Drive Baywood Store Road	US 58 (Grayson Parkway)	
Greene	4.21	6.78	SR 623 (Swift Run Road)	Beazley Road Celt Road Pea Ridge Road	SR 810 (Dyke Road)	
Greensville	2.30	3.70	North Carolina State Line	Steel Bridge Road Unnamed road	SR 730 (Low Ground Road)	
Halifax	9.38	15.10	SR 626 (Clarkton Road)	Coles Ferry Road Lake Conner Road	Dead End	
Hanover	3.95	6.36	SR 673 (Howards Mill Road)	Abner Church Road Cauthorne Road	Henrico County Line	Gap between segments ending at different points along SR 623
Henry	1.13	1.82	Pittsylvania County Line	Pineview Lane	SR 979 (Breckenridge Circle)	
Highland	7.70	12.39	SR 629	Unnamed road	SR 654 (Johnston Road)	
Isle of Wight	0.64	1.03	Dead End	Unnamed road	SR 10 (Old Stage Highway)	
James City	0.10	0.16	SR 650 (Foley Drive)	Coleman Drive	York County Line	
King and Queen	3.10	4.99	SR 635 (Bradley Farm Road)	Root Swamp Road	Caroline County Line	
King George	5.10	8.21	SR 206/SR 218	Owens Drive Mathias Point Road	Dead End	
King William	1.11	1.79	SR 640 (Wakema Road)	Trimmers Shop Road	Dead End	
Lancaster	2.43	3.91	Dead End	Rocky Neck Road Western Branch Road	SR 665 (Sulla Vans Road)	Gap between segments ending at different points along SR 354
Lee	3.41	5.49	SR 606	Rawhide Loop Glenbrook Mountain Road	Kentucky State Line	Gap between segments ending at different points along SR 606
Loudoun	1.90	3.06	Prince William County Line	Peach Orchard Lane	SR 600 (New Road)	
Louisa	3.30	5.31	SR 623 (Chopping Road)	Mount Pleasant Church Road	SR 625 (Chalklevel Road)	
Lunenburg	0.40	0.64	SR 625 (Bethel Church Road)	Molasses Hill Road	Prince Edward County Line	
Madison	1.20	1.93	SR 662 (Shiffletts Corner Lane)	Annies Road	SR 607 (Repton Mill Road)	
Mathews	0.20	0.32	SR 625 (Tick Neck Road)	Store Road	Dead End	
Mecklenburg	4.83	7.77	Brunswick County Line	Canaan Church Road Morris Town Circle Hillcrest Road	SR 1503 (Carter Street)	
Middlesex	2.50	4.02	SR 626 (Wake Road)	Regent Road Syringa Road	SR 3 (Greys Point Road)	
Montgomery	10.28	16.54	Blacksburg Town Limits	Mount Tabor Road	Roanoke County Line	
Nelson	1.16	1.87	US 29 (Thomas Nelson Highway)	Stage Bridge Road Pine Trail	SR 623 (Stage Bridge Road/Myndus Road)	
New Kent	1.15	1.85	SR 623 (Cooksmill Road)	Old Sweet Hall Ferry	Dead End	
Northampton	2.10	3.38	SR 645 (Arlington Road)	Capeville Drive Dunton Cove Drive	Dead End	
Northumberland	6.88	11.07	US 360 (Northumberland Highway)	Lewisetta Road River Road	End Loop	
Nottoway	9.14	14.71	SR 723 (Lewiston Plank Road)	Cary Shop Road Second Street First Street Iverness Road	SR 723 (Lewiston Plank Road)	
Orange	6.00	9.66	SR 651 (Tatum Road)	Tower Road	SR 650 (Independence Road)	
Page	5.95	9.58	Dead End	Pine Grove Road Hawksbill Drive Unnamed road	SR 632	Gap between segments ending at different points along SR 689
Patrick	1.95	3.14	SR 623 (Union Bridge Road)	Union Church Road	Dead End	
Pittsylvania	1.00	1.61	Henry County Line	Gammon Lake Road	SR 841 (Stillmeadow Road)	
Powhatan	1.03	1.66	Dead End	Venita Road	Dead End	
Prince Edward	2.00	3.22	Lunenburg County Line	Old Peach Tree Road Barton Road	SR 623 (Twin Bridges Road)	
Prince George	1.00	1.61	Sussex County Line	Alden Road	US 460/SR 601	
Prince William	1.00	1.61	SR 701 (Logmill Road)	Little River Road	Loudoun County Line	
Pulaski	3.14	5.05	SR 798 (Falling Branch Road)	New River Road Hickman Cemetery Road	SR 600 (Belspring Road)	
Rappahannock	1.00	1.61	SR 622 (Harris Hollow Road)	Sunnyside Orchard Lane	Dead End	
Richmond	15.34	24.69	Dead End	Sabine Hall Road Newland Road	Westmoreland County Line	Gap between segments ending at different points along US 360
Roanoke	7.77	12.50	Montgomery County Line	Unnamed road Newport Road	SR 311 (Catawba Valley Drive)	
Rockbridge	4.55	7.32	SR 631 (Big Spring Drive)	Unnamed road Maple Swamp Road	SR 602 (Turkey Hill Road)	Gap between segments ending at different points along SR 625
Rockingham	2.10	3.38	US 33 (Spotswood Trail)	Mill Lane	SR 623 (Mount Pleasant Road)	
Russell	8.20	13.20	SR 637 (Wysor Valley Road)	Drill Road	SR 630 (Cartwright Road)	
Scott	6.09	9.80	SR 623	Unnamed road Bunker Road Unnamed road	SR 604 (Pattonsville Road)	Gap between segments ending at different points along SR 753 Gap between segments ending at different points along SR 638
Shenandoah	0.37	0.60	SR 762 (Old Factory Road)	Meadow Mills Road	Dead End	
Smyth	5.70	9.17	Dead End	Ridgedale Road Milldam Road	SR 42 (Old Wilderness Road)	Gap between segments ending at different points along SR 16
Southampton	0.11	0.18	Surry County Line	Tin Top Road	SR 618 (Crumpler Road)	
Spotsylvania	2.10	3.38	SR 613 (Brock Road)	Piney Branch Road	SR 612 (Catharpin Road)	
Stafford	1.44	2.32	SR 626 (Leeland Road)	Morton Road/Forbes Street	US 1 (Jefferson Davis Highway)	
Surry	2.50	4.02	SR 617 (White Marsh Road)	Southampton Road	Southampton County Line	
Sussex	1.70	2.74	SR 602 (Cabin Point Road)	Warwick Road	Prince George County Line	Name of Warwick Road found on Google Maps - Kelly P. Sharpe
Tazewell	10.90	17.54	SR 622 (Reynolds Ridge Road/Hunting Hill Road)	Panther Branch Road Amonate Road	West Virginia State Line	Gap between segments ending at different points along SR 627
Warren	7.58	12.20	Front Royal Town Limits	Happy Creek Road Morgan Ford Road Milldale Road	Clarke County Line	
Washington	0.70	1.13	SR 614 (Smith Creek Road)	Smith Creek Road	Dead End	
Westmoreland	6.92	11.14	Richmond County Line	Flat Iron Road Horner Road Muse Road	Dead End	Gap between segments ending at different points along SR 3
Wise	1.16	1.87	SR 625 (Stephens Road)	Unnamed road	Wise Town Limits	
Wythe	0.10	0.16	US 52 (Fort Chiswell Road)	Unnamed road	SR 608 (Foster Falls Road/Pauley-Flatwood Road)	
York	0.35	0.56	Dead End	Sparrer Road	SR 787 (Old Seaford Road)	
