= Virginia State Route 790 =

Secondary route designation

State Route 790

Route information
- Maintained by VDOT

Location
- Country: United States
- State: Virginia

Highway system
- Virginia Routes; Interstate; US; Primary; Secondary; Byways; History; HOT lanes

State Route 790 (SR 790) in the U.S. state of Virginia is a secondary route designation applied to multiple discontinuous road segments among the many counties. The list below describes the sections in each county that are designated SR 790.

== List ==
County	Length (mi)	Length (km)	From	Via	To	Notes
Accomack	1.20	1.93	US 13 (Lankford Highway)	Thornton Road	SR 679 (Atlantic Road)	
Albemarle	0.30	0.48	SR 795 (Blenheim Road)	Pine Road Holly Road	Dead End	
Amherst	0.15	0.24	SR 791 (Lee Drive)	Adrian Street	SR 677 (Dixie Airport Road)	
Augusta	1.17	1.88	SR 262 (Woodrow Wilson Parkway)	Lewis Creek Road West Amber Road	SR 612 (Laurel Hill Road)	
Bedford	0.50	0.80	Dead End	Powell Lane	SR 746 (Dickerson Mill Road)	
Botetourt	0.25	0.40	Dead End	Laurel Lane	SR 652 (Mountain Pass Road)	
Campbell	2.40	3.86	SR 615 (Red House Road)	Homeplace Road	SR 615 (Red House Road)	
Carroll	0.40	0.64	Dead End	Piney Woods Road	SR 720 (Marthas Knob Road)	
Chesterfield	1.03	1.66	SR 672 (Adkins Road)	Wagstaff Circle Northland Drive	SR 4225 (Northcreek Drive)	
Fairfax	1.98	3.19	SR 641/SR 10647 (Creekside View Lane)	Pohick Road Alban Road	SR 617 (Backlick Road)	
Fauquier	1.25	2.01	Dead End	Boteler Road	SR 642 (Calverton Road)	
Franklin	1.00	1.61	SR 890 (Snow Creek Road)	Potters Creek Road	Dead End	
Frederick	0.70	1.13	SR 608 (Wardensville Grade)	Richard Lane	Dead End	
Halifax	1.30	2.09	Dead End	Old Cedar Trail	SR 609 (West Store Road)	
Hanover	0.27	0.43	Dead End	Proffitt Farm Road	SR 610 (Taylors Creek Road)	
Henry	0.10	0.16	Dead End	Dans Drive	SR 647 (Mountain Valley Road)	
James City	0.03	0.05	SR 671 (The Colony)	Lakeside Circle	Cul-de-Sac	
Loudoun	2.05	3.30	SR 630 (Quaker Unison Road)	Newlin Mill Road	SR 611 (Saint Louis Road)	
Louisa	1.98	3.19	SR 1071 (Laurelwood Drive)	Shorewood Drive Mitchell Point Road	Cul-de-Sac	
Mecklenburg	0.30	0.48	SR 683 (Lenhart Road/Lenhart Drive)	Pine Place	Dead End	
Montgomery	0.30	0.48	Floyd County line	Forage Road	SR 637 (Alleghany Spring Road)	
Pittsylvania	8.08	13.00	SR 799 (Climax Road)	Piney Road Brushy Mountain Road	SR 760 (Music Street)	Gap between segments ending at different points along SR 672
Prince William	0.03	0.05	Dead End	Carborough Street	SR 762 (Oakmont Avenue)	
Pulaski	0.55	0.89	SR 100 (Clebone Road)	Laboratory Street	Dead End	
Roanoke	0.10	0.16	SR 747 (Goodman Road)	Dickerson Road	Dead End	
Rockbridge	1.52	2.45	Dead End	Tank Hollow Road	SR 781	
Rockingham	3.60	5.79	SR 613 (North Mountain Road)	Vetters Road Getz Drive	SR 617 (Spar Mine Road)	Gap between segments ending at different points along SR 789
Scott	0.70	1.13	SR 71	Antioch Circle Pin Oak Circle	SR 71	
Shenandoah	0.22	0.35	SR 1320 (Moore Avenue)	Center Street	US 11 (Main Street)	
Spotsylvania	0.07	0.11	US 17 Bus	Bowman Drive	Dead End	
Stafford	0.04	0.06	SR 739 (Holly Circle)	Camelot Court	Dead End	
Tazewell	0.40	0.64	SR 786 (Rocky Hollow Road/Ravens Nest Branch Road)	Perkins Hollow Road	Dead End	
Washington	0.35	0.56	Dead End	Morning Glory Lane	SR 745 (Old Saltworks Road)	
Wise	1.53	2.46	US 23 Bus	West Norton Road	Norton city limits	
York	0.07	0.11	Dead End	Blanton Drive	SR 778 (Kenneth Drive)	
