= Virginia State Route 625 =

State highway in Virginia, United States

State Route 625

Route information
- Maintained by VDOT

Location
- Country: United States
- State: Virginia

Highway system
- Virginia Routes; Interstate; US; Primary; Secondary; Byways; History; HOT lanes

State Route 625 (SR 625) in the U.S. state of Virginia is a secondary route designation applied to multiple discontinuous road segments among the many counties. The list below describes the sections in each county that are designated SR 625.

== List ==
County	Length (mi)	Length (km)	From	Via	To	Notes
Accomack	1.10	1.77	SR 731 (Texaco Town Road)	Big Farm Road	SR 639 (Phillips Drive)	
Albemarle	2.30	3.70	SR 726 (James River Road)	Hatton Ferry Road	Buckingham County Line	
Alleghany	1.81	2.91	Covington Town Limits	East Dolly Ann Drive	Dead End	
Amelia	0.80	1.29	Dinwiddie County Line	Red House Road	SR 610 (Wills Road)	
Amherst	4.30	6.92	SR 610 (Sandidges Road)	Gidsville Road	SR 621 (Indian Creek Road)	
Appomattox	0.20	0.32	SR 626 (Holiday Lake Road)	Vaughns Creek Road	Prince Edward County Line	
Augusta	0.21	0.34	Dead End	Clinic Lane	SR 285 (Tinkling Spring Road)	
Bath	7.60	12.23	SR 629 (Deerfield Road/McClung Drive)	River Road	SR 678 (Indian Draft)	
Bedford	0.50	0.80	SR 711 (Bethel Church Road)	Austin Mill Road	Campbell County Line	
Bland	8.20	13.20	Dead End	Mountain Glen Drive Ceres School Road Poor Valley Road	Dead End	Gap between segments ending at different points along SR 622
Botetourt	11.40	18.35	SR 43 (Parkway Drive)	Pico Road Mount Joy Road Trebark Road	Dead End	Gap between segments ending at different points along US 11 Gap between SR 601 and SR 630
Brunswick	0.70	1.13	Dead End	Unnamed road	Mecklenburg County Line	
Buchanan	4.45	7.16	Dead End	Unnamed road	Russell County Line	
Buckingham	0.70	1.13	SR 695 (White Rock Road)	Hatton Ferry Road	Albemarle County Line/James River/Hatton Ferry	
Campbell	1.80	2.90	Bedford County Line	Austin Mill Road	SR 623 (Town Fork Road)	
Caroline	10.47	16.85	King and Queen County Line	Passing Road	Essex County Line	
Carroll	2.40	3.86	SR 638 (Dugspur Road)	Brannon Road	Floyd County Line	
Charles City	2.35	3.78	SR 658 (Kimages Road)	West Run Road	SR 609 (Barnetts Road)	
Charlotte	2.30	3.70	SR 637 (Sylvan Hill Road)	Mill Pond Road	SR 611 (Hebron Church Road)	
Chesterfield	7.44	11.97	Colonial Heights City Limits	Branders Bridge Road	SR 681 (Hundred Road)	
Clarke	2.48	3.99	Dead End	Unnamed road Kennel Road Unnamed road	SR 723 (Millwood Road)	Gap between segments ending at different points along SR 622
Craig	2.20	3.54	SR 42	Unnamed road	SR 624	
Culpeper	9.10	14.65	SR 685 (Chestnut Fork Road)	Mount Zion Church Road Ryland Chapel Road	SR 621 (Lakota Road)	
Cumberland	1.10	1.77	Dead End	Barber Road	SR 45 (Cartersville Road)	
Dickenson	1.70	2.74	SR 600	Unnamed road	SR 80 (Helen Henderson Highway)	
Dinwiddie	3.52	5.66	US 460	Wells Road	Amelia County Line	
Essex	3.68	5.92	Caroline County Line	Supply Road	US 17 (Tidewater Trail)	
Fairfax	0.29	0.47	SR 629 (Fort Hunt Road)	Wellington Road Wellington Drive	Mount Vernon Memorial Highway	
Fauquier	0.70	1.13	US 29 (Lee Highway)	Pilgrims Road	Dead End	
Floyd	0.70	1.13	Carroll County Line	Bolt Mill Road	SR 758 (Buffalo Mountain Road)	
Fluvanna	2.06	3.32	SR 601 (Courthouse Road)	Oak Creek Road Oak Hill Lane	Dead End	
Franklin	2.36	3.80	SR 652 (Circle Creek)	Danbury Road	SR 646 (Doe Run Road)	
Frederick	8.10	13.04	SR 1124 (Sixth Street)	Fifth Street Unnamed road Veterans Road Unnamed road Germany Road	SR 628 (Middle Road)	
Giles	6.49	10.44	Montgomery County Line	Goodwyns Ferry Road Walnut Road Mount Zion Road	US 460	Gap between segments ending at different points along SR 730
Gloucester	1.34	2.16	SR 623 (Ware Neck Road)	Ditchley Road	Dead End	
Goochland	4.15	6.68	SR 600 (Rock Castle Road)	Three Square Road Saint Pauls Church Road	SR 45 (Cartersville Road)	Gap between segments ending at different points along SR 616
Grayson	3.20	5.15	North Carolina State Line	Mount Olivet Road Kemps River Road	SR 626 (Old Baywood Road)	
Greene	0.21	0.34	US 33 (Spotswood Trail)	Golden Horseshoe Road	Shenandoah National Park boundary	
Greensville	9.64	15.51	North Carolina State Line	Unnamed road	SR 628 (Miles Town Road)	Gap between segments ending at different points along SR 622
Halifax	1.60	2.57	SR 626 (Clarkton Road)	Ellis Creek Road	SR 624 (Coles Ferry Road)	
Hanover	5.15	8.29	US 33 (Mountain Road)	Greenwood Road	Henrico County Line	
Henry	4.33	6.97	SR 697 (Middle Creek Road/Moyer Lane)	Martin Lane Poplar Fork Road	SR 697 (Barker Road)	Gap between segments ending at different points along SR 650
Highland	2.00	3.22	Dead End	Unnamed road	West Virginia State Line	
Isle of Wight	4.85	7.81	SR 681 (Raynor Road)	Modest Neck Road Pons Road	Surry County Line	Gap between segments ending at different points along SR 621
King and Queen	7.20	11.59	SR 628 (Spring Cottage Road/Poplar Hill Road)	Poplar Hill Road Byrds Mill Road	Caroline County Line	
King George	10.45	16.82	US 301/SR 607 (Port Conway Road)	Salem Church Road Dickensons Corner Road Prim Road	SR 629 (Round Hill Road)	Gap between segments ending at different points along SR 628
King William	7.73	12.44	SR 30 (King William Road)	Custis Millpond Road Indian Town Road	End of Loop	
Lancaster	3.31	5.33	Dead End	Paynes Creek Road White Hall Road Slabtown Road	SR 682 (Millenbeck Road)	Gap between segments ending at different points along SR 354
Lee	1.00	1.61	Dead End	Sigma Road	SR 606	
Loudoun	12.29	19.78	Leesburg Town Line	Sycolin Road Ashburn Farm Parkway Farmwell Road Waxpool Road Church Road	SR 604 (Sugarland Way)	
Louisa	5.20	8.37	SR 22 (Davis Highway)	Chalklevel Road	SR 613 (Goldmine Road)	
Lunenburg	4.70	7.56	SR 662 (Nutbush Road)	Bethel Church Road	Nottoway County Line	
Madison	2.00	3.22	SR 607 (Elly Road)	Tom Johnston Road	SR 616 (Carpenters Mill Road)	
Mathews	0.80	1.29	SR 660 (River Road)	Tick Neck Road	Dead End	
Mecklenburg	5.49	8.84	Brunswick County Line	Carroll Road	SR 624 (Canaan Church Road)	
Middlesex	4.40	7.08	SR 33 (General Puller Highway)	Bobs Hole Road Barricks Mill Road	SR 628 (Mill Creek Road)	
Montgomery	3.58	5.76	SR 652 (McCoy Road)	Big Falls Road	Giles County Line	
Nelson	2.00	3.22	SR 623 (Davis Creek Road)	Perry Lane	Dead End	
New Kent	1.30	2.09	SR 623 (Cooksmill Road)	Hill Farm Road	Dead End	
Northampton	2.00	3.22	SR 618 (Bayside Road)	Sylvan Scene Drive	SR 600 (Seaside Road)	
Northumberland	1.70	2.74	SR 624 (Lewisetta Road)	Cowart Road)	Dead End	
Nottoway	16.08	25.88	Lunenburg County Line	Courthouse Road	Blackstone Town Limits	
Orange	1.40	2.25	Dead End	Porter Road	SR 20 (Constitution Highway)	
Patrick	2.70	4.35	US 58 (Jeb Stuart Highway)	Mountain View Loop	US 58 (Jeb Stuart Highway)	
Pittsylvania	0.70	1.13	SR 41 (Franklin Turnpike)	Foxridge Road	Dead End	
Powhatan	2.60	4.18	Dead End	Powhatan Lakes Road	Dead End	
Prince Edward	3.00	4.83	Appomattox County Line	Featherfin Road	SR 609 (Peaks Road)	
Prince George	12.87	20.71	Sussex County Line	County Line Road Arwood Road Hines Road	SR 10 (James River Drive)	
Prince William	2.86	4.60	US 15 (James Madison Highway)	Haymarket Drive Old Carolina Road Jefferson Street Old Carolina Road	US 15 (James Madison Highway)	
Pulaski	1.50	2.41	SR 627 (Highland Road)	Morgan Farm Road	SR 624 (Hickman Cemetery Road)	
Rappahannock	1.02	1.64	SR 622 (Harris Hollow Road)	Plains Lane	Dead End	
Richmond	0.65	1.05	SR 622 (Carters Wharf Road)	Cliffs Road	Dead End	
Roanoke	0.60	0.97	SR 623 (Florist Road)	Hershberger Road	SR 115 (Plantation Road)	
Rockbridge	2.65	4.26	SR 631 (Big Spring Drive)	Bethany Road	SR 602 (Turkey Hill Road)	
Rockingham	4.56	7.34	SR 759 (Fox Mountain Road/Newtown Road)	Thoroughfare Road	Page County Line	
Russell	0.70	1.13	Dickenson County Line	Sandy Ridge	SR 621 (Sandy Ridge/Hurricane Fork)	
Scott	11.05	17.78	Tennessee State Line	Unnamed road	US 23	
Shenandoah	1.40	2.25	SR 642 (Country Brook Road)	Harman Road	US 11 (Old Valley Pike)	
Smyth	0.07	0.11	US 11 (Lee Highway)	Virginia Highland Avenue	SR 686 (Adkins Tank Road)	
Southampton	1.50	2.41	SR 626 (Appleton Road)	Quarter Road	SR 631 (Mission Church Road)	
Spotsylvania	1.50	2.41	Dead End	Ashby Drive	SR 674 (Chancellor Road)	
Surry	1.62	2.61	Isle of Wight County Line	Bellevue Road	SR 617 (White Marsh Road)	
Sussex	8.80	14.16	SR 35 (Jerusalem Plank Road)	Newville Road	Prince George County Line	
Tazewell	4.60	7.40	SR 623 (Burkes Garden Road)	Banks Ridge Road	SR 666 (Gose Mill Road)	
Warren	0.25	0.40	SR 637 (Guard Hill Road)	Pine Hills Road	Dead End	
Washington	10.31	16.59	SR 614 (Smith Creek Road)	Jasper Creek Road Pine Hill Road Harleywood Road Bordwine Road	US 11 (Lee Highway)	Gap between segments ending at different points along SR 616 Gap between segments ending at different points along SR 700
Westmoreland	8.00	12.87	SR 638 (Leedstown Road)	Twiford Road Horners Mill Road	SR 624 (Flat Iron Road)	Gap between segments ending at different points along SR 640
Wise	2.50	4.02	SR 620 (Guest River Road)	Stephens Road	SR 823 (Indian Creek Road)	
Wythe	18.58	29.90	SR 672 (Ward Branch Road)	Kiser Road Greek Miller Road Wyrick Spring Road Crockett Road Apple House Road Gap of Ridge Road Unnamed road	Dead End	Gap between segments ending at different points along US 11 Gap between segments ending at different points along SR 680
York	0.24	0.39	SR 652 (Claxton Creek Road)	Purgold Road	SR 626 (Shirley Road)	
