= Carlton Corner, Virginia =

Unincorporated community in Virginia, United States

- Unincorporated community
- Location within the Commonwealth of Virginia Carlton Corner (the United States)
- Coordinates: 37°43′49″N 76°49′58″W
- Country: United States
- State: Virginia
- County: King and Queen
- Time zone: UTC−5 (Eastern (EST))
  - Summer (DST): UTC−4 (EDT)

Carlton Corner is an unincorporated community in King and Queen County, Virginia, United States. It is a very rural area centered on the intersection of Mt. Zion Road and State Route 617. According to GNIS, the site is also known as Carlton's Store.

During the Civil War, there was a Confederate encampment near the Carlton's Store community, which was captured by Union soldiers in 1864. About 1,200 soldiers and civilians were driven out of the camp.
