= Virginia State Route 617 =

Secondary state highway in Virginia, United States

State Route 617

Route information
- Maintained by VDOT

Location
- Country: United States
- State: Virginia

Highway system
- Virginia Routes; Interstate; US; Primary; Secondary; Byways; History; HOT lanes

State Route 617 (SR 617) in the U.S. state of Virginia is a secondary route designation applied to multiple discontinuous road segments among the many counties. The list below describes the sections in each county that are designated SR 617.

== List ==
County	Length (mi)	Length (km)	From	Via	To	Notes
Accomack	3.46	5.57	SR 614 (Shell Bridge Road)	Pennyville Road Nandua Road	Dead End	Gap between segments ending at different points along SR 178
Albemarle	0.90	1.45	Nelson County Line	Rockfish River Road	SR 602 (Howardsville Turnpike)	
Alleghany	2.40	3.86	Craig County Line	Jamison Mountain Road	SR 616	
Amelia	8.80	14.16	Nottoway County Line/Prince Edward County Line	Saylers Creek Road Saint James Road	SR 642 (Amelia Springs Road)	Gap between segments ending at different points along SR 616
Amherst	10.55	16.98	US 60 (Lexington Turnpike)	Bailey Sawmill Road Poor House Farm Road Thrashers Creek Road Unnamed road Thrashers Creek Road Poor House Farm Road Thrashers Creek Road	Dead End	Gap between segments ending at different points along SR 610
Appomattox	2.55	4.10	SR 618 (Hollywood Road)	Coleman Mountain Road	SR 626 (Holiday Lake Road)	
Augusta	5.25	8.45	SR 907 (Tilt Hammer Circle)	Swisher Road Round Hill School Road Red Mill Lane McGuslin Lane	SR 628 (McGuslin Lane	Gap between segments ending at different points along SR 608 Gap between segments ending at different points along SR 865
Bath	0.35	0.56	SR 615 (Bacova Junction Highway/Main Street)	Thomastown Road	Dead End	
Bedford	5.47	8.80	SR 695 (Goose Creek Valley Road)	Pike Road	SR 693 (Statler Road)	
Bland	6.77	10.90	US 52 (South Scenic Highway)	Waddletown Road	US 52	
Botetourt	1.08	1.74	SR 625 (Pico Road)	Schoolhouse Road Newtown Road Kessler Lane	US 11 (Main Street)	Gap between SR 1321 and a Dead End
Brunswick	4.50	7.24	Lunenburg County Line	Blue Bird Road	SR 616 (Macedonia Road)	
Buchanan	2.20	3.54	Dead End	Little Prater	US 460	
Buckingham	15.72	25.30	SR 649 (Slate River Mill Road)	Banton Shop Road Copper Mine Road Staunton Town Road Gravel Hill Road	Cumberland County Line	Gap between segments ending at different points along US 15
Campbell	0.35	0.56	Dead End	Deer Path	SR 690 (Clarks Road)	
Caroline	1.40	2.25	Dead End	Fortune Drive	SR 630 (Sparta Road)	
Carroll	1.10	1.77	SR 814 (Fireside Drive/Trillium Road)	Fireside Drive	SR 632 (Maple Shade Road)	
Charles City	2.10	3.38	SR 106 (Roxbury Road)	Monguy Road	Dead End	
Charlotte	7.70	12.39	SR 672 (Midway Road)	Old Well Road Bethel Road	SR 619 (Cub Creek Church Road/Aspen Wall Road)	
Chesterfield	3.06	4.92	SR 746 (Enon Church Road)	Ramblewood Drive	SR 898 (Ware Bottom Spring Road)	
Clarke	4.79	7.71	SR 723 (Main Street)	Old Chapel Avenue Old Chapel Road Briggs Road	SR 621 (Elerslie Road)	
Craig	14.18	22.82	SR 615	Unnamed road	Alleghany County Line	
Culpeper	7.70	12.39	SR 692 (Old Orange Road)	Winston Road Racoon Ford Road	Orange County Line	Gap between segments ending at different points along US 522
Cumberland	0.25	0.40	Buckingham County Line	Gravel Hill Road	SR 622 (Trents Mill Road)	
Dickenson	0.88	1.42	SR 607 (Walnut Street)	Unnamed road	Dead End	
Dinwiddie	3.19	5.13	SR 616 (Ridge Road)	Bolster Road	SR 665 (Walkers Mill Road)	Gap between segments ending at different points along SR 619
Essex	2.35	3.78	US 17	Richmond Beach Road Island Farm Road	Dead End	
Fairfax	7.01	11.28	US 1 (Richmond Highway)	Backlick Road	SR 244 (Columbia Pike)	Gap between SR 286 and I-95/SR 790 Gap between segments ending at different points along SR 789
Fauquier	5.90	9.50	SR 615 (Thompsons Mill Road)	Blackwells Mill Road	SR 616 (Bristersburg Road)	
Floyd	3.03	4.88	SR 8 (Webbs Mill Road)	Carriage Road White Oak Grove Road	Montgomery County Line	
Fluvanna	1.45	2.33	SR 631 (Troy Road)	Little Creek Road Morris Road	Dead End	
Franklin	1.00	1.61	Dead End	Dundee Road	SR 646 (Doe Run Road)	
Frederick	2.10	3.38	West Virginia State Line	Pinetop Road	SR 704 (Back Creek Road)	
Giles	1.45	2.33	Dead End	Croft Road	SR 771 (Lebanon Road)	
Gloucester	1.60	2.57	Dead End	Tanyard Landing Road	SR 610 (Davenport Road/Pinetta Road)	
Goochland	1.50	2.41	US 250 (Broad Street)	Oilville Road	Hanover County Line	
Grayson	1.90	3.06	SR 622 (Delhart Road)	White Pine Road	SR 607 (Meadow Creek Road)	
Greene	3.50	5.63	SR 743 (Advance Mills Road)	Dunnes Shop Road	SR 633 (Amicus Road)	
Greensville	0.68	1.09	SR 610 (Slagles Lake Road)	Water Wheel Road	SR 614 (Otterdam Road)	
Halifax	4.36	7.02	SR 616 (Neals Corner Road)	Cove Road	Dead End	
Hanover	8.53	13.73	Goochland County Line	Pinhook Road Spring Road Bourne Road Waldrop Lane	Dead End	Gap between segments ending at different points along SR 611 Gap between segments ending at different points along SR 610
Henry	1.06	1.71	US 58 (A L Philpott Highway)	Sugar Tree Drive	Pittsylvania County Line	
Highland	9.87	15.88	SR 624	Unnamed road	Dead End	Gap between segments ending at different points along SR 654
Isle of Wight	0.43	0.69	SR 691 (Jamestown Lane)	Council Road Unnamed road	Dead End	
James City	2.80	4.51	Dead End	Treasure Island Road Lake Powell Road	Dead End	Gap between segments ending at different points along SR 618
King and Queen	13.50	21.73	SR 631 (Poor House Lane)	Providence Road White House Lane Exol Road Carletons Corner Road	SR 14 (The Trail)	Gap between segments ending at different points along SR 612
King George	3.35	5.39	SR 205 (Ridge Road)	Poplar Neck Road	US 301 (James Madison Parkway)	
King William	1.90	3.06	SR 30 (King William Road)	Spring Forest Road	SR 30 (King William Road)	
Lancaster	1.25	2.01	SR 3/SR 622	Alfonso Road	SR 600 (Lara Road)	
Lee	1.90	3.06	SR 70 (Trail of the Lonesome Pine)	Counts Road	SR 612 (Middle Wallens Creek Road)	
Loudoun	2.00	3.22	SR 860 (Watson Road)	Red Hill Road	SR 621 (Evergreen Mills Road)	
Louisa	4.80	7.72	SR 615 (Columbia Road)	Green Springs Road	SR 640 (Jack Jouett Road)	Gap between segments ending at different points along US 15
Lunenburg	4.34	6.98	SR 138 (Hill Road)	Fairview Road	Brunswick County Line	
Madison	0.60	0.97	Dead End	Whites Lane	SR 231 (Blue Ridge Turnpike)	
Mathews	6.17	9.93	Dead End	River Road	SR 14 (John Clayton Memorial Highway)	Gap between segments ending at different points along SR 660
Mecklenburg	3.20	5.15	Dead End	Old Saint Tammany Road	SR 618 (Marengo Road)	
Middlesex	0.70	1.13	US 17 Bus	Watson Landing	Dead End	
Montgomery	5.96	9.59	Floyd County Line	Laurel Ridge Mill Road Brush Creek Road	SR 615 (Pilot Road)	
Nelson	12.09	19.46	Albemarle County Line	Rockfish River Road Buck Creek Lane	Dead End	
New Kent	2.86	4.60	SR 618 (Olivet Church Road)	Crisscross Lane	SR 155 (Courthouse Road)	
Northampton	6.21	9.99	Dead End	Bayford Road Red Bank Road	Dead End	
Northumberland	4.30	6.92	SR 600 (Gibeon Road)	Lively Hope Road Henderson Drive Gardys Mill Road	Westmoreland County Line	Gap between segments ending at different points along SR 202
Nottoway	5.20	8.37	SR 607 (Bible Road)	Winningham Road	SR 615 (Namozine Road)	
Orange	4.52	7.27	SR 20 (Constitution Highway)	Everona Road	US 522 (Zachary Taylor Highway)	
Page	1.20	1.93	Dead End	Dam Acres Road	SR 650 (Honeyville Road)	
Patrick	0.94	1.51	North Carolina State Line	State Line Road	SR 773 (Ararat Highway)	
Pittsylvania	0.70	1.13	Henry County Line	Gallery Road	SR 954 (Plantation Drive)	
Powhatan	6.00	9.66	SR 711 (Huguenot Trail Road)	Old River Trail	Dead End	
Prince Edward	4.46	7.18	US 460 (Prince Edward Highway)	Saylers Creek Road	SR 620 (Schuffletown Road)	
Prince George	0.90	1.45	SR 618 (Hollywood Road)	Hollywood Road	Dead End	
Prince William	0.09	0.14	Dead End	Sheridan Lane	SR 702 (Grant Avenue)	
Pulaski	7.45	11.99	SR 747 (Old Route 11)	Ruebush Road Neck Creek Road	SR 600 (Belspring Road)	Gap between segments ending at different points along SR 627
Rappahannock	1.90	3.06	SR 615 (Turkey Ridge Road)	Castleton Ford Road Castleton View Road	SR 618 (Laurel Mills Road/Hope Hill Road)	Gap between segments ending at different points along SR 616
Richmond	0.80	1.29	SR 607 (Canal Road)	Normans Corner Road	US 360 (Richmond Road)	
Roanoke	4.76	7.66	SR 866 (Ellington Street)	Pitzer Road	Franklin County Line	
Rockbridge	0.20	0.32	Dead End	Cemetery Lane	SR 601	
Rockingham	11.80	18.99	SR 753 (Wengers Mill Road)	Woodlands Church Road Sunset Road Sunset Drive Sunset Road Sunset Drive Spar Mine Road Church Street Evergreen Valley Road	Shenandoah County Line	Gap between segments ending at different points along SR 809 Gap between segments ending at different points along SR 259 Gap between segments ending at different points along SR 42
Russell	0.20	0.32	SR 67 (Swords Creek Road)	Pumpkin Center Road	SR 632 (Lynn Springs Road)	
Scott	4.37	7.03	Tennessee State Line	Unnamed road Boozy Creek Road Shelleys Road	Washington County Line	Gap between segments ending at different points along SR 618 Gap between segments ending at different points along US 58
Shenandoah	3.71	5.97	Rockingham County Line	Evergreen Valley Road River Road	SR 616 (Ridge Road)	Gap between segments ending at different points along SR 728
Smyth	23.93	38.51	SR 107	Unnamed road Walkers Creek Road West Lakeview Lane Shortly Stone Road Crowe Hollow Road Stovall Road Davis Valley Road	Wythe County Line	Gap between segments ending at different points along SR 16 Gap between SR 689 and a dead end Gap between segments ending at different points along SR 622
Southampton	6.00	9.66	SR 618 (Crumpler Road)	Worrique Road	SR 620 (Broadwater Road)	
Spotsylvania	3.00	4.83	SR 605 (Marye Road)	Hams Ford Road	SR 606 (Morris Road)	
Stafford	0.52	0.84	SR 630 (Courthouse Road)	Rockdale Road	Dead End	
Surry	18.75	30.18	Sussex County Line	White Marsh Road Bacons Castle Terrace	SR 650 (Hog Island Road)	Formerly SR 196 Gap between segments ending at different points along SR 10
Sussex	0.87	1.40	SR 31 (Main Street)	Rocky Hock Road	Surry County Line	Formerly SR 196
Tazewell	7.14	11.49	US 460	Red Root Ridge Road	Buchanan County Line	
Warren	1.70	2.74	SR 618	Ridgeway Road	SR 626 (Steed Lane)	
Washington	7.60	12.23	Scott County Line	Cove Creek Road Livingston Creek Road Lime Hill Road	SR 633 (Reedy Creek Road)	Gap between segments ending at different points along SR 630 Gap between segments ending at different points along SR 700
Westmoreland	1.50	2.41	Northumberland County Line	Gardys Mill Road	SR 202 (Cople Highway)	
Wise	0.43	0.69	SR 609	Unnamed road	SR 613	
Wythe	5.90	9.50	Smyth County Line	Dutton Hollow Road Unnamed road	Dead End	Gap between segments ending at different points along SR 680
York	0.73	1.17	SR 620 (Link Road)	Railway Road	Dead End	
