= Virginia State Route 609 (Fairfax County) =

State highway in Virginia, United States

State Route 609
- Pleasant Valley Road
- SR 609 highlighted in red

Route information
- Maintained by VDOT
- Length: 6.12 mi (9.85 km)
- Tourist routes: Virginia Byway

Major junctions
- South end: US 29 in Centreville
- SR 620 near Chantilly
- North end: US 50 in Chantilly

Location
- Country: United States
- State: Virginia
- Counties: Fairfax

Highway system
- Virginia Routes; Interstate; US; Primary; Secondary; Byways; History; HOT lanes

State Route 609 in Fairfax County, Virginia is a secondary state highway which traverses western portion of the county. The road is also known as Pleasant Valley Road.

== Route description ==
Pleasant Valley Road's southern terminus is at US 29 in Centreville. It serves as an arterial road through the neighborhood of Virginia Run for its southernmost few miles. Once it leaves the neighborhood, Pleasant Valley becomes a twisty two-lane road, meeting SR 620 (Braddock Road) at a roundabout about a mile north of Virginia Run. The road continues north, passing Pleasant Valley Golf Club (named for the road) and going through another large residential development (called Cub Run after a nearby stream). Pleasant Valley ends at US 50 after passing by a row of office buildings, including one housing an Intel office.

=== Loudoun SR 609 ===
As SR 609 approaches US 50, a spur goes off to the west into Loudoun County. The Virginia Department of Transportation has chosen to number that spur SR 609 (Loudoun County). Loudoun County has named that road Pleasant Valley Road, as well. Thus, the driver on US 50 driving into Loudoun first comes across SR 609 (Fairfax County) (Pleasant Valley Rd.), and one block later comes across SR 609 (Loudoun County) (Pleasant Valley Rd.).

== History ==
Pleasant Valley Road is named for the location at the northern terminus of the road (on US 50; that road was called the Little River Turnpike in the American Civil War) on the Loudoun side of the county line, Pleasant Valley. In 1862, Confederate soldiers camped there as they were marching toward the site of the Battle of Chantilly.

== Major intersections ==
The entire route is in Fairfax County.

Location	mi	km	Destinations	Notes
Centreville	0.00	0.00	US 29 (Lee Highway)	Southern terminus
Chantilly	6.12	9.85	US 50 (Lee Jackson Memorial Highway)	Northern terminus
1.000 mi = 1.609 km; 1.000 km = 0.621 mi
