= Virginia State Route 622 =

State highway in Virginia, United States

State Route 622

Route information
- Maintained by VDOT

Location
- Country: United States
- State: Virginia

Highway system
- Virginia Routes; Interstate; US; Primary; Secondary; Byways; History; HOT lanes

State Route 622 (SR 622) in the U.S. state of Virginia is a secondary route designation applied to multiple discontinuous road segments among the many counties. The list below describes the sections in each county that are designated SR 622.

== List ==
County	Length (mi)	Length (km)	From	Via	To	Notes
Accomack	4.01	6.45	SR 696 (Keller Fair Road)	Deerfoot Road Piggin Road Trower Road	SR 605 (Bradfords Neck Road)	
Albemarle	3.10	4.99	SR 795 (Blenheim Road)	Albevanna Spring Road	SR 618 (Jefferson Mill Lane)	
Alleghany	0.60	0.97	SR 616 (Rich Patch Road)	Rose Hill Lane	Dead End	
Amelia	12.41	19.97	Dinwiddie County Line	Cobbs Road Mill Quarter Road Greenes Road	SR 612 (Richmond Road)	
Amherst	20.57	33.10	SR 334 (Lynchburg Training School and Hospital Road)	Colony Road CVT Road Wright Shop Road New Wright Shop Road Galts Mill Road Stapleton Road Unnamed road Allens Creek Road	Nelson County Line	
Appomattox	2.40	3.86	Dead End	Railroad Lane	SR 633 (Spruce Drive)	Gap between segments ending at different points along SR 620
Augusta	5.15	8.29	SR 611 (Dooms Crossing Road/Calf Mountain Road)	Calf Mountain Road Flat Rock Road	Dead End	Gap between segments ending at different points along the Waynesboro City Limits
Bath	0.90	1.45	Dead End	Robinson Lane	US 220 (Stuart Highway)	
Bedford	7.12	11.46	SR 646 (Gladden Circle)	Everett Road Waterlick Road	Campbell County Line	Gap between segments ending at different points along SR 81
Bland	13.73	22.10	SR 42 (Blue Grass Highway)	Birch Grove Road Foglesong Valley Road Whackertown Road Shewey Valley Road	Dead End	
Botetourt	28.14	45.29	Dead End	Chapel Road Solitude Road Rocky Road Alpine Road Buffalo Road Garden Mountain Road Dagger Spring Road Gala Loop Road Prices Bluff Road Bridge Street Main Street	Dead End	Gap between a dead end and SR 608 Gap between FR-55 and FR-54 Gap between segments ending at different points along SR 611 Gap between segments ending at different points along SR 612 Gap between segments ending at different points along US 220
Brunswick	1.32	2.12	SR 631 (Antioch Road)	Pine Ridge Road	Dead End	
Buchanan	4.10	6.60	SR 620	Ball Creek	SR 625	
Buckingham	16.11	25.93	Cumberland County Line	Trents Mill Road Johnson Station Road Melita Road Sharon Church Road	SR 20 (Constitution Route)	Gap between segments ending at different points along US 15 Gap between segments ending at different points along SR 676
Campbell	11.08	17.83	Bedford County Line	Waterlick Road Lynbrook Road Leland Road Depot Road	US 501/SR 24 (Campbell Highway)	Gap between segments ending at different points along US 29 Gap between segments ending at different points along SR 738
Caroline	1.54	2.48	Dead End	Durrette Road	US 1 (Jefferson Davis Highway)	
Carroll	2.10	3.38	US 221 (Floyd Pike)	Indian Valley Road	Floyd County Line	
Charles City	0.98	1.58	SR 106 (Roxbury Road)	CC Road	SR 600 (Charles City Road)	
Charlotte	3.22	5.18	US 15 (Kings Highway)	Old Kings Road West Ontario Road	Lunenburg County Line	Gap between segments ending at different points along US 15 Bus/US 360 Bus
Chesterfield	1.60	2.57	SR 603 (Skinquarter Road)	Clayville Lane	Powhatan County Line	
Clarke	7.23	11.64	SR 658 (Sugar Hill Road)	Bordens Spring Road Swift Shoals Road	US 50 (John S Mosby Highway)	
Craig	3.60	5.79	SR 42	Unnamed road	SR 42	
Culpeper	1.30	2.09	US 211 (Lee Highway)	Old Bridge Road	SR 613 (Waterloo Road)	
Cumberland	6.65	10.70	US 60 (Anderson Highway)	Trents Mill Road	Buckingham County Line	
Dickenson	1.65	2.66	SR 631 (Brush Creek Road)	Unnamed road	Dead End	
Dinwiddie	13.36	21.50	SR 650 (Lew Jones Road)	Baltimore Road	Amelia County Line	Gap between segments ending at different points along SR 613
Essex	3.85	6.20	King and Queen County Line	Faucetts Road Latanes Mill Road Faucetts Road Latanes Mill Road	SR 620 (Dunbrooke Road)	
Fairfax	1.39	2.24	SR 619 (Old Mill Road)	Pole Road	SR 3191 (Frye Road)	
Fauquier	3.64	5.86	Dead End	Whiting Road	SR 710 (Rectortown Road)	
Floyd	4.79	7.71	Carroll County Line	Indian Valley Post Office Road	SR 787 (Indian Valley Road)	
Fluvanna	1.10	1.77	Albemarle County Line	Ridge Spring Road	Albemarle County Line	
Franklin	3.00	4.83	SR 40 (Franklin Street)	Saint Johns Road	Patrick County Line	
Frederick	12.81	20.62	Shenandoah County Line	Minebank Road Cedar Creek Grade	Winchester City Limits	Gap between segments ending at different points along SR 627 Gap between segments ending at different points along SR 628
Giles	16.89	27.18	End State Maintenance	Woods Road Broad Hollow Road Guinea Mountain Road Deacon Street Engleston River Road Bear Springs Road	SR 730 (West Eggleston Road)	Gap between segments ending at different points along SR 100 Gap between segments ending at different points along SR 730
Gloucester	1.65	2.66	SR 3 (John Clayton Memorial Highway)	Toddsbury Lane	Dead End	
Goochland	3.95	6.36	US 250 (Broad Street)	Three Chopt Road Rockville Road	Hanover County Line	Gap between dead ends
Grayson	6.80	10.94	SR 625 (Mount Olivet Road)	Beaver Creek Road Delhart Road	SR 626 (Old Baywood)	Gap between segments ending at different points along SR 624
Greene	2.16	3.48	SR 624 (Beazley Road)	Celt Road	US 33 Bus (Main Street)	Formerly SR 243
Greensville	10.64	17.12	SR 730 (Low Ground Road)	Little Low Ground Road Unnamed road	SR 730 (Low Ground Road)	
Halifax	1.00	1.61	Dead End	Waltman Trail	SR 360 (Mountain Road)	
Hanover	3.60	5.79	Goochland County Line	Rockville Road Walnut Hill Drive Walnut Hill Road	Dead End	
Henry	9.66	15.55	Dead End	Farmbrook Road Morgan Ford Road	Pittsylvania County Line	Gap between segments ending at different points along SR 750
Highland	2.10	3.38	SR 654 (Johnston Road)	Unnamed road	West Virginia State Line	
Isle of Wight	3.10	4.99	SR 646 (Rattlesnake Trail)	Ramsey Road Sycamore Cross Drive	Surry County Line	Gap between segments ending at different points along SR 621
James City	3.55	5.71	New Kent County Line	Racefield Drive	SR 601 (Barnes Road)	
King and Queen	0.49	0.79	US 360 (Richmond Highway)	Minor Road	Essex County Line	
King George	2.00	3.22	SR 679 (Canterbury Loop)	Ashland Mill Road	SR 205 (Ridge Road)	
King William	0.80	1.29	SR 632 (Mount Olive-Cohoke Road)	Hills Fork Road	Dead End	
Lancaster	6.66	10.72	Dead End	Morattico Road	SR 3 (Mary Ball Road)	
Lee	3.70	5.95	SR 982 (Seminar Church Road)	Cave Springs Road	Dead End	Gap between segments ending at different points along SR 621
Loudoun	4.44	7.15	SR 690 (Silcott Springs Road)	Shoemaker School Road Greggsville Road	SR 630 (JEB Stuart Road)	Gap between segments ending at different points
Louisa	4.75	7.64	SR 652 (Kentucky Springs Road)	Moody Town Road	SR 701 (Eastham Road)	
Lunenburg	17.51	28.18	Dead End	Mountain Road Rehoboth Road Ontario Road	Charlotte County Line	
Madison	2.80	4.51	SR 705 (Twymans Mill Road)	Tanners Road Woodberry Drive	Dead End	
Mathews	1.54	2.48	Dead End	Evans Road Long Road	SR 621 (Glebe Road)	
Mecklenburg	4.20	6.76	SR 660 (Old Cox Road)	Lone Oak Road	SR 47/SR 662	
Middlesex	0.77	1.24	SR 623 (Regent Road)	Dirt Bridge Road	SR 3 (Greys Point Road)	
Montgomery	7.69	12.38	SR 603 (Fork Road)	Reesdale Road Flatwoods Road Bradshaw Road	Roanoke County Line	
Nelson	3.00	4.83	Amherst County Line	Allens Creek Road Spring Lane	SR 626 (Cabell Road)	
New Kent	0.10	0.16	US 60 (Pocahontas Trail)	Liberty Church Road	James City County Line	
Northampton	4.92	7.92	Dead End	Glebe Road Bayside Road Trehemvielle Drive	SR 600 (Seaside Road)	Gap between segments ending at different points along SR 619 Gap between segments ending at different points along SR 618
Northumberland	2.65	4.26	SR 712 (Lodge Road/Harry Hogan Road)	Harry Hogan Road	Dead End	
Nottoway	3.10	4.99	SR 625 (Courthouse Road)	Hancock Road Raccoon Crossing Road	Prince Edward County Line	Gap between segments ending at different points along SR 624
Orange	3.90	6.28	SR 602 (Old Office Road/Black Walnut Run Road)	Old Office Road	SR 663 (True Blue Road)	
Page	2.87	4.62	SR 624 (Pine Grove Road)	Judy Lane Extension Park Road Pond Avenue Unnamed road	SR 635	Gap between segments ending at different points along US 340 Bus
Patrick	4.90	7.89	SR 40 (Charity Highway)	Deer Run Road	Franklin County Line	
Pittsylvania	9.61	15.47	Henry County Line	Cascade Road West Fork Road	SR 841 (Whispering Pines Road)	
Powhatan	7.40	11.91	Chesterfield County Line	Clayville Road Dorset Road	US 60 (James Anderson Highway)	Gap between segments ending at different points along SR 604
Prince Edward	0.80	1.29	Nottoway County Line	Racoon Crossing Road	US 360	
Prince George	4.50	7.24	SR 35/SR 605	Providence Road Fairwood Road	SR 608 (Johnson Road/Garys Church Road)	Gap between segments ending at different points along SR 607
Prince William	3.61	5.81	SR 621 (Balls Ford Road)	Groveton Road Featherbed Road	SR 234 (Sudley Road)	
Pulaski	1.06	1.71	Dead End	Dudley Ferry Road	SR 695 (Old Peppers Ferry Loop)	
Rappahannock	18.68	30.06	SR 1101 (Gay Street)	Calvert Street Harris Hollow Road Gidbrown Hollow Road Rock Mills Road Aaron Mountain Road	SR 729 (Richmond Road)	
Richmond	5.00	8.05	Dead End	Carters Wharf Road Snyder Road	Westmoreland County Line	Gap between segments ending at different points along SR 624
Roanoke	11.95	19.23	Montgomery County Line	Bradshaw Road	SR 864 (Old Catawba Road)	
Rockbridge	9.97	16.05	SR 627 (Sycamore Valley Drive)	Unnamed road Maple Swamp Road Unnamed road	SR 716 (Mount Atlas Road)	Gap between segments ending at different points along SR 623 Gap between segments ending at different points along SR 602
Rockingham	1.10	1.77	SR 623 (Mount Pleasant Road)	Hensley Hollow	Dead End	
Russell	8.36	13.45	Buchanan County Line	Grissom Creek Road Miller Creek Road	SR 67 (Swords Creek Road)	
Scott	3.36	5.41	SR 621 (England Valley Road)	Unnamed road	SR 603 (Canton Road)	Gap between segments ending at different points along SR 600
Shenandoah	3.10	4.99	SR 633 (Red Bud Road)	Clary Road Orndorff Road Minebank Road	Frederick County Line	Gap between segments ending at different points along SR 629
Smyth	17.26	27.78	SR 16	Nicks Creek Road Bear Creek Road	SR 42 (Old Wilderness Road)	Gap between segments ending at different points along US 11 Gap between segments ending at different points along SR 620
Southampton	6.26	10.07	SR 618 (Sadler Road)	New Road Rawls Drive New Road	SR 614 (Seacock Chapel Road)	Gap between segments ending at different points along SR 635
Spotsylvania	3.75	6.04	Dead End	Lucks Road Fairview Road	SR 738 (Partlow Road)	
Stafford	1.60	2.57	SR 626 (Leeland Road)	Walnut Drive	Dead End	
Surry	6.73	10.83	Isle of Wight County Line	Aberdeen Road Runnymeade Road	SR 31 (Rolfe Highway)	Gap between segments ending at different points along SR 617
Sussex	10.01	16.11	SR 634 (Old Forty Road)	Beaver Dam Road Unnamed road	SR 628 (Courtland Road)	Gap between segments ending at different points along SR 35 Gap between segments ending at different points along SR 606
Tazewell	4.40	7.08	SR 621 (Stinson Creek Road/Middle Creek Road)	Hunting Hill Road Reynolds Ridge Road	SR 616 (Bearwallow Road)	
Warren	6.40	10.30	SR 634 (Smith Run Road)	Unnamed road	SR 674 (Limeton Church Road)	Gap between dead ends
Washington	6.38	10.27	SR 640 (Benhams Road)	Nordyke Road	SR 614 (Barnrock Road)	
Westmoreland	7.46	12.01	Richmond County Line	Peach Grove Lane Polk Street Panorama Road Stratford Hall Road Currioman Road	Dead End	Gap between segments ending at different points along SR 3 Gap between segments ending at different points along SR 643
Wise	0.88	1.42	US 23/SR 610	Unnamed road	Norton City Limits	
Wythe	1.62	2.61	Dead End	Lone Ash Road	SR 100 (Wysor Highway)	
York	4.86	7.82	Dead End	Brick Church Road Seaford Road	Dead End	Gap between segments ending at different points along SR 173 Gap between US 17 and SR 173 Gap between segments ending at different points along SR 718
