= Virginia State Route 615 =

State highway in Virginia, United States

State Route 615

Route information
- Maintained by VDOT

Location
- Country: United States
- State: Virginia

Highway system
- Virginia Routes; Interstate; US; Primary; Secondary; Byways; History; HOT lanes

State Route 615 (SR 615) in the U.S. state of Virginia is a secondary route designation applied to multiple discontinuous road segments among the many counties. The list below describes the sections in each county that are designated SR 615.

== List ==
County	Length (mi)	Length (km)	From	Via	To	Notes
Accomack	2.60	4.18	Dead End	Cradockville Road	SR 178 (Boston Road/Shields Bridge Road)	
Albemarle	1.60	2.57	Louisa County Line	Lindsay Road	SR 231 (Gordonsville Road)	
Alleghany	2.90	4.67	SR 616 (Ritch Patch Road)	Blue Spring Run Road	SR 18 (Potts Creek Road)	
Amelia	10.36	16.67	Nottoway County Line	Namozine Road	SR 708 (Cralles Road)	Gap between segments ending at different points along SR 614
Amherst	3.55	5.71	Dead End	Peters Hollow Road Sardis Road	US 60 (Lexington Turnpike)	Gap between SR 643 and a dead end
Appomattox	7.80	12.55	SR 26 (Oakville Road)	Liberty Chapel Road Walnut Hill Road Rock Fence Road	Buckingham County Line	Gap between segments ending at different points along SR 616 Gap between segments ending at different points along SR 654
Augusta	2.15	3.46	US 340 (East Side Highway)	Point Lookout Road Trayfoot Road	SR 614 (Paine Run Road)	Gap between segments ending at different points along SR 870
Bath	2.88	4.63	SR 687 (Jackson River Turnpike)	Bacova Junction Highway/Main Street	US 220 (Ingalls Boulevard)	
Bedford	2.50	4.02	SR 638 (Charlemont Road)	Sweet Hollow Road	SR 613 (Waugh Switch Road)	
Bland	9.68	15.58	US 52 (South Scenic Highway)	Suiter Road Railroad Trail Bears Trail	Dead End	
Botetourt	17.73	28.53	Craig County Line	Craig Creek Road	US 220 (Botetourt Road)	
Brunswick	4.60	7.40	Lunenburg County Line	Cedar Creek Road	SR 46 (Christanna Highway)	
Buchanan	3.25	5.23	SR 604 (Poplar Gap Road)	Hoot Owl Street	US 460/SR 83	
Buckingham	3.00	4.83	Appomattox County Line	Hawksview Road	US 60 (James Anderson Highway)	
Campbell	18.27	29.40	SR 24 (Village Highway)	Red House Road	Charlotte County Line	
Caroline	5.40	8.69	US 17 (Tidewater Trail)	Buckner Road Skinkers Neck Road	SR 614 (Ware Creek Road)	
Carroll	1.30	2.09	SR 610/SR 645	Little Valley Road	SR 616 (Sunflower Road)	
Charles City	9.97	16.05	SR 5 (John Tyler Memorial Highway)	Glebe Lane	SR 623 (Wilcox Neck Road)	
Charlotte	8.26	13.29	Campbell County Line	Lawyers Road Rolling Hill Road	SR 47 (Thomas Jefferson Highway)	
Chesterfield	2.66	4.28	SR 616 (Osborne Road)	Coxendale Road	Dead End	
Clarke	2.65	4.26	SR 7 Bus (Main Street)	1st Street Boom Road	Sipe Hollow Lane	
Craig	9.46	15.22	SR 311 (Salem Avenue)	Main Street Craigs Creek Road Unnamed road	Botetourt County Line	Gap between segments ending at different points along SR 638 Gap between segments ending at different points along SR 649 Gap between segments ending at different points along SR 686
Culpeper	7.47	12.02	Orange County Line	Rapidan Road	US 522 (Zachary Taylor Highway)	
Cumberland	3.70	5.95	SR 608 (Sugarfork Road)	Game Farm Road Whiteville Road	SR 45 (Cartersville Road)	
Dickenson	1.75	2.82	Dead End	Unnamed road	SR 611	
Dinwiddie	1.32	2.12	Dead End	Blue Tartan Road	FR-81 (Frontage Road)	
Essex	2.81	4.52	SR 691 (Gordons Mill Road)	Mussel Swamp Road	SR 609 (Essex Mill Road)	
Fairfax	1.50	2.41	Dead End	Yates Ford Road	SR 645 (Clifton Road)	Gap between segments ending at different points along SR 614
Fauquier	6.35	10.22	SR 632 (Union Church Road)	Silver Hill Road Mount Ephriam Road Rock Run Road Blackwells Mills Road Thompsons Mill Road	Stafford County Line	Gap between segments ending at different points along SR 651 Gap between dead ends Gap between segments ending at different points along SR 813
Floyd	14.45	23.26	Dead End	Griffith Lane Haycock Road Barberry Road Christiansburg Pike	Montgomery County Line	Gap between segments ending at different points along SR 635 Gap between segments ending at different points along US 221
Fluvanna	3.44	5.54	US 15 (James Madison Highway)	Carysbrook Road Zion Road	Louisa County Line	Gap between SR 601 and US 250
Franklin	3.00	4.83	Roanoke County Line	Webb Mountain Road	SR 684 (Boones Mill Road)	
Frederick	0.89	1.43	SR 600 (Hayfield Road)	Mount Olive Road	US 50 (Northwestern Pike)	
Giles	3.34	5.38	SR 613 (Doe Creek Road)	Kow Camp Road	US 460 (Virginia Avenue)	
Gloucester	8.08	13.00	US 17 (George Washington Memorial Highway)	Willis Road Burleigh Road Short Lane	SR 629 (T C Walker Road)	Gap between segments ending at different points along SR 606 Gap between segments ending at different points along SR 616
Goochland	7.45	11.99	SR 6 (River Road)	Chapel Hill Road Forest Grove Road	SR 609 (Three Chopt Road)	Gap between segments ending at different points along SR 673
Grayson	4.40	7.08	Dead End	Grouse Hollow Lane Savannah Road	SR 613 (Edmonds Road)/North Carolina State Line	
Greene	1.93	3.11	SR 627 (Bacon Hollow Road)	Evergreen Church Road	SR 810 (Dyke Road)	
Greensville	2.30	3.70	SR 610 (Slagles Lake Road)	Unnamed road	SR 614 (Otterdam Road)	
Halifax	4.60	7.40	US 501 (L P Bailey Memorial Highway)	Tucker Road Winns Creek Road	SR 610 (Clays Mill Road)	Gap between segments ending at different points along SR 626
Hanover	9.51	15.30	Henrico County Line	Creighton Road Walnut Grove Road Williamsville Road Nelson Bridge Road	King William County Line	Gap between SR 636 and US 360 Gap between segments ending at different points along SR 627 Gap between segments ending at different points along SR 605
Henry	1.80	2.90	SR 647 (Mountain Valley Road)	Dees Road	Pittsylvania County Line	
Highland	4.60	7.40	US 250	Unnamed road	SR 678 (Bullpasture River Road)	
Isle of Wight	6.20	9.98	Suffolk City Limits	Jenkins Mill Road Holly Run Drive	US 258 (Walters Highway)	Gap between segments ending at different points along US 58 Bus
James City	4.74	7.63	SR 31 (Jamestown Road)	Ironbound Road Longhill Connector Road	SR 612 (Longhill Road)	Gap between SR 613/SR 783 and SR 321 Gap between the Williamsburg City Limits and SR 322
King and Queen	1.40	2.25	SR 610 (Liberty Hall Road)	Union Hope Church Road	SR 614 (Rock Spring Road)	
King George	1.50	2.41	SR 218 (Windsor Drive)	Berry Wharf Road	Dead End	
King William	6.40	10.30	Hanover County Line	Nelsons Bridge Road	SR 604 (Dabneys Mill Road)	
Lancaster	7.42	11.94	Northumberland County Line	Beanes Road Crawfords Corner Road Carlson Road	SR 200 (Jesse DuPont Memorial Highway)	Four gaps between segments ending at different points along the Northumberland County Line
Lee	3.06	4.92	SR 654 (Hurricane Road)	Unnamed road	SR 612 (Lower Waldens Creek Road)	
Loudoun	1.23	1.98	Prince William County Line	Old Carolina Road	US 15 (Monroe Highway)	
Louisa	8.21	13.21	Fluvanna County Line	Zion Road Columbia Road Mahanes Road	Albemarle County Line	
Lunenburg	3.60	5.79	SR 601 (Fletcher Chapel Road)	Rash Maddux Drive	Brunswick County Line	
Madison	4.58	7.37	Greene County Line	Bluff Mountain Road	SR 662 (Graves Mill Road)	
Mathews	0.60	0.97	Dead End	Town Point Landing	SR 14 (John Clayton Memorial Highway)	
Mecklenburg	11.43	18.39	SR 707 (Phillis Road)	Redlawn Road	SR 903 (Goodes Ferry Road)	
Middlesex	4.34	6.98	Dead End	Braxton Corr Road Zion Branch Road Town Bridge Road Lord Mott Road	Dead End	Gap between segments ending at different points along SR 602
Montgomery	8.62	13.87	Floyd County Line	Old Pike Road Pilot Road	Christiansburg Town Limits	
Nelson	0.67	1.08	US 29 (Thomas Nelson Highway)	Thurmond Hollow Lane	Dead End	
New Kent	2.44	3.93	Dead End	Mountcastle Road	SR 106 (Emmaus Church Road)	Gap between segments ending at different points along US 60 (Pocahontas Trail)
Northampton	2.50	4.02	Dead End	Saltworks Road	SR 183 (Occohannock Neck Road)	
Northumberland	0.73	1.17	SR 201 (Court House Road)	Beanes Road Crawfords Corner Road	Lancaster County Line	Four gaps between segments ending at different points along the Lancaster County Line
Nottoway	8.30	13.36	US 360 (Patrick Henry Highway)	Namozine Road	Amelia County Line	
Orange	5.61	9.03	Orange Town Limits	Rapidan Road	Culpeper County Line	
Page	12.19	19.62	US 340 Bus	Unnamed road	Dead End	Gap between US 340 and US 340 Bus Gap between US 340/SR 614 and US 211 Gap between segments ending at different points along SR 675
Patrick	1.45	2.33	SR 616 (Mill Houses Road)	Jacks Creek Road	SR 8 (Woolwine Highway)	
Pittsylvania	0.50	0.80	SR 616 (Mosco Road)	Taylor Road	Henry County Line	
Powhatan	11.52	18.54	SR 621 (Cosby Road)	Three Bridge Lane Three Bridge Road	SR 711 (Robius Road)	
Prince Edward	0.65	1.05	Dead End	Oak Hill Road	SR 657 (Sulphur Spring Road)	
Prince George	0.40	0.64	SR 614 (Wards Creek Road/Nobles Road)	Nobles Road	Dead End	
Prince William	2.07	3.33	US 15 (James Madison Highway)	Loudoun Drive	Loudoun County Line	Gap between segments ending at different points along SR 600
Pulaski	1.05	1.69	SR 611 (Wilderness Road)	Landrum Road	Dead End	
Rappahannock	6.60	10.62	SR 650/Culpeper County Line	Turkey Ridge Road Castleton Ford Road	SR 729 (Richmond Road)	Gap between segments ending at different points along SR 617
Richmond	1.40	2.25	Dead End	Folly Neck Road	SR 614 (Folly Neck Road/Beaver Dam Road)	
Roanoke	5.82	9.37	Franklin County Line	Webb Road Starlight Lane	SR 613 (Merriman Road)	Gap between segments ending at different points along US 220
Rockbridge	4.40	7.08	Dead End	Unnamed road	SR 601	Gap between segments ending at different points along SR 42
Rockingham	3.70	5.95	SR 881 (Orchard Drive)	Radars Church Road Cold Spring Road Switch Back Road	Shenandoah County Line	Gap between segments ending at different points along SR 42
Russell	19.61	31.56	SR 683 (Memorial Drive)	Red Oak Ridge Road Gravel Lick Road Back Valley Road	SR 620 (Finney Road)	Gap between segments ending at different points along SR 600
Scott	3.60	5.79	US 58 (Bristol Highway)	Unnamed road	Washington County Line	
Shenandoah	0.50	0.80	Rockingham County Line	Switchback Road	SR 616 (Ridge Road)	
Smyth	6.88	11.07	Dead End	Mill Road Citizens Road	Wythe County Line	Gap between segments ending at different points along US 11
Southampton	6.62	10.65	US 58 (Southampton Parkway)	Hicksford Road Adams Grove Road	SR 612 (Fortsville Road)	
Spotsylvania	2.02	3.25	SR 610 (Elys Ford Road)	Rapidan Drive	Dead End	
Stafford	3.80	6.12	Fauquier County Line	Mill Road Skyline Drive	SR 612 (Hartwood Road)	Gap between segments ending at different points along SR 614
Surry	7.20	11.59	SR 31 (Rolfe Highway)	Carsley Road	SR 40 (Martin Luther King Highway)	
Sussex	6.76	10.88	SR 40 (Main Street)	Georgetown Road Unnamed road	SR 603	
Tazewell	0.70	1.13	Richlands Town Line	Hill Creek Road	Dead End	
Warren	3.96	6.37	SR 619 (Rivermont Drive)	Stokes Airport Road Unnamed road Wakeman Mill Road	SR 619 (Mountain Road)	
Washington	1.69	2.72	Scott County Line	Federal Road	SR 614 (Swinging Bridge Road)	
Westmoreland	3.70	5.95	Richmond County Line	Jerusalem Church Road	SR 604 (Sandy Point Road)	
Wise	0.60	0.97	US 23 Bus	Wampler Hollow Road	SR 613 (East Stone Gap Road)	
Wythe	3.06	4.92	Smyth County Line	Unnamed road Mountain View Avenue	SR 749 (Cedar Springs Road)	Gap between segments ending at different points along SR 670
York	0.54	0.87	SR 658 (Yorkville Road)	Charles Road	Dead End	
