= Virginia State Route 616 =

State highway in Virginia, United States

State Route 616

Route information
- Maintained by VDOT

Location
- Country: United States
- State: Virginia

Highway system
- Virginia Routes; Interstate; US; Primary; Secondary; Byways; History; HOT lanes

State Route 616 (SR 616) in the U.S. state of Virginia is a secondary route designation applied to multiple discontinuous road segments among the many counties. The list below describes the sections in each county that are designated SR 616.

== List ==
County	Length (mi)	Length (km)	From	Via	To	Notes
Accomack	1.80	2.90	SR 178 (Boston Road)	Cedar View Road	Dead End	
Albemarle	4.16	6.69	Fluvanna County Line	Union Mill Road Black Cat Road	SR 22 (Louisa Road)	
Alleghany	19.38	31.19	SR 18 (Potts Creek Road)	Unnamed road Rich Patch Road	SR 696 (Selma Low Moor Road)	Gap between segments ending at different points along SR 613
Amelia	23.98	38.59	Nottoway County Line	Genito Road	SR 604 (Chula Road)	
Amherst	3.40	5.47	US 60 (Lexington Turnpike)	Peter Hollow Road West Monitor Road Cherry Hill Road	Dead End	Gap between segments ending at different points along SR 617
Appomattox	13.36	21.50	SR 627 (River Ridge Road)	Old Grist Mill Road Wildway Road	US 60 (Anderson Highway)	
Augusta	14.77	23.77	SR 732 (Roman Road)	Liberty School Road Grey Fox Road Salem Church Road Morningside Drive Fort Defiance Road Dam Town Road Humbert Road Shaver Lane Unnamed road Belvidere Lane Rock Mountain Lane	Dead End	Gap between segments ending at different points along SR 804 Gap between segments ending at different points along SR 608 Gap between segments ending at different points along SR 865
Bath	0.20	0.32	SR 615 (Bacova Junction Highway/Main Street)	Pinehurst Heights	SR 650 (Lee Roy Road)	
Bedford	22.01	35.42	Dead End	Horseshoe Bend Road Sandy Level Road Masons Lane Saunders Road Sandy Ford Road Fosters Knob Road	Botetourt County Line	Gap between segments ending at different points along SR 757 Gap between segments ending at different points along SR 653 Gap between segments ending at different points along SR 619 Gap between segments ending at different points along SR 607
Bland	0.30	0.48	SR 617 (Waddletown Road)	Sandy Hollow Road	FR 2 (Sandy Hollow Road)	
Botetourt	1.87	3.01	SR 1516 (Walnut Drive)	Blue Ridge Springs Road	Dead End	
Brunswick	13.08	21.05	Lunenburg County Line	Macedonia Road Lew Jones Road	SR 612 (Harpers Bridge Road)	Gap between segments ending at different points along SR 46
Buchanan	15.60	25.11	SR 622 (Reynolds Ridge Road)	Unnamed road	SR 639 (Compton Mountain Road)	
Buckingham	0.50	0.80	Dead End	Roberts Road	SR 659 (Ranson Road)	
Campbell	0.40	0.64	SR 600 (Sugar Hill Road)	Wydner Road	Charlotte County Line	
Caroline	0.79	1.27	SR 618 (Alps Road)	Beverley Run Road	Dead End	
Carroll	2.78	4.47	SR 645 (Woodstock Road)	Sunflower Road	SR 610 (Terrys Mill Road)	
Charles City	0.30	0.48	SR 5 (John Tyler Memorial Highway)	Adams Bridge Road	Dead End	
Charlotte	5.65	9.09	Campbell County Line	Smiths Mill Road Whites Chapel Road	SR 727 (Red House Road)	Gap between segments ending at different points along SR 672
Chesterfield	4.37	7.03	SR 619 (Happy Hill Road)	Chester Road South Curtis Street Osborne Road	SR 732 (Old Stage Road)	
Clarke	1.14	1.83	US 340 (Lord Fairfax Highway)	Church Street	US 340 (Buckmarsh Street)	
Craig	2.06	3.32	SR 1004 (Market Street)	Court Street Unnamed road	Dead End	
Culpeper	1.40	2.25	US 522 (Sperryville Pike)	Woodland Church Road	SR 638 (Cherry Hill Road)	
Cumberland	8.78	14.13	SR 45 (Cartersville Road)	Deep Run Road	SR 45 (Cartersville Road)	
Dickenson	1.20	1.93	SR 63 (Big Ridge Road)	Unnamed road	SR 614 (The Lake Road)	
Dinwiddie	3.10	4.99	Sussex County Line	Ridge Road	SR 609 (Cherryhill Road)	
Essex	5.55	8.93	SR 611 (Wares Wharf Road)	River Stretch Road Grandview Drive	Dead End	
Fairfax	0.97	1.56	Prince William County Line	Ordway Road	SR 658 (Compton Road)	
Fauquier	19.70	31.70	Stafford County Line	Bristersburg Road Casanova Road Beach Road Green Road Beach Road	US 15/US 17/US 29 (James Madison Highway)	Gap between segments ending at different points along SR 806 Gap between segments ending at different points along SR 643 Two gaps between segments ending at different points along SR 674
Floyd	1.30	2.09	SR 705 (Sowers Road)	Otey Road	Montgomery County Line	
Fluvanna	6.80	10.94	Albemarle County Line	Union Mills Road	US 15 (James Madison Highway)	
Franklin	10.70	17.22	Dead End	Scruggs Road Morewood Road	Dead End	Gap between segments ending at different points along SR 122
Frederick	4.80	7.72	SR 618 (Gough Road)	Whissens Ridge Road McDonald Road	SR 608 (Wardensville Grade)	Gap between segments ending at different points along SR 608
Giles	0.20	0.32	SR 615 (Kow Camp Road)	Lyda Lane	Dead End	
Gloucester	8.96	14.42	Dead End	Clay Bank Road Belroi Road Roaring Springs Road	Dead End	Gap between segments ending at different points along SR 614 Gap between segments ending at different points along US 17 Bus
Goochland	6.00	9.66	Dead End	Stokes Station Road Haskins Road	SR 6 (River Road)	
Grayson	2.00	3.22	SR 622 (Delhart Road)	Link Road	SR 626 (Old Baywood Road)	
Greene	1.71	2.75	SR 607 (Matthew Mill Road)	Carpenters Mill Road	US 29 (Seminole Trail)	
Greensville	1.13	1.82	US 301	Unnamed road Moonlight Road	Dead End	Gap between segments ending at different points along SR 614
Halifax	4.10	6.60	SR 603 (Hunting Creek Road)	Neals Corner Road	SR 746 (Mount Laurel Road)	
Hanover	1.00	1.61	New Kent County Line	Peace Road	SR 628 (McClellan Road)	
Henry	3.93	6.32	SR 648 (Stoney Mountain Road)	Jones Ridge Road Robertson Ridge Road	Pittsylvania County Line	Gap between segments ending at different points along SR 647
Highland	6.82	10.98	SR 614	Unnamed road	Dead End	Gap between segments ending at different points along US 250
Isle of Wight	3.57	5.75	Suffolk City Limits	Lees Mill Road Airport Drive	Dead End	Gap between segments ending at different points along US 58 Bus
James City	1.12	1.80	SR 5 (John Tyler Memorial Highway)	Strawberry Plains Road	SR 615 (Ironbound Road)	
King and Queen	6.90	11.10	SR 14 (The Trail)	Mount Zion Road Liberty Hall Road	SR 610 (Hickory Hill Road)	
King George	2.66	4.28	US 301 (James Madison Parkway)	Washington Mill Road Brickhouse Road	Dead End	Gap between segments ending at different points along SR 218
King William	2.30	3.70	Dead End	Chinquapin Road	Dead End	Gap between SR 30 and SR 617
Lancaster	2.40	3.86	SR 201 (Court House Road)	Davis Mill Road	SR 604 (Regina Road)	
Lee	7.74	12.46	SR 665	Unnamed road	SR 612 (Lower Waldens Creek Road)	Gap between segments ending at different points along SR 654
Loudoun	4.65	7.48	SR 620 (Braddock Road)	Goshen Road Fleetwood Road	SR 621 (Evergreen Mills Road)	
Louisa	0.40	0.64	SR 615 (Columbia Road)	Whitlock Road	SR 22 (Louisa Road)	
Lunenburg	3.90	6.28	SR 602 (Long View Road)	Gigg Road	Brunswick County Line	
Madison	9.43	15.18	Dead End	Caves Ford Lane Tatums School Road Locust Grove Church Road Good Hope Church Road Carpenters Mill Road	SR 626 (Oneals Road)/SR 634 (Oak Park Road)	Two gaps between segments ending at different points along SR 620
Mathews	0.54	0.87	SR 198	Hookemfair Road	Dead End	
Mecklenburg	2.35	3.78	SR 4 (Buggs Island Road)	Jerusalem Road	SR 711 (Mineral Springs Road)	
Middlesex	1.42	2.29	SR 615 (Town Bridge Road/Zion Branch Road)	Town Bridge Road	US 17 (Tidewater Trail)	
Montgomery	7.90	12.71	SR 673 (Camp Carysbrook Road)	Old Rough Road Rustic Ridge Road	Floyd County Line/SR 617	Gap between segments ending at different points along SR 8 Gap between segments ending at different points along SR 601
Nelson	2.72	4.38	US 29 (Thomas Nelson Highway)	Hickory Creek Road	SR 634 (Spring Valley Road/Old Roberts Mountain Road)	
New Kent	0.70	1.13	SR 611 (South Quaker Road)	Peace Road	Hanover County Line	
Northampton	0.50	0.80	SR 618 (Bayside Road)	Cedar Cottage Road	Dead End	
Northumberland	0.39	0.63	SR 600/Richmond County Line	Luttrellville Road	US 360 (Richmond Road)	
Nottoway	4.10	6.60	Prince Edward County Line	Genito Road	Amelia County Line	Gap between segments ending at different points along SR 307
Orange	1.81	2.91	Dead End	Montford Road	SR 20 (Constitution Highway)	
Page	6.67	10.73	US 340 Bus	Leaksville Road	Luray Town Limits	
Patrick	4.34	6.98	SR 613 (Lone Ivy Road/North Fork Road)	Mill House Road	SR 8 (Woolwine Highway)	
Pittsylvania	3.61	5.81	Henry County Line	Mosco Road	SR 855 (Martin Drive)	
Powhatan	0.90	1.45	SR 711 (Robius Road)	Pleasants Road	Dead End	
Prince Edward	0.50	0.80	US 460 (Prince Edward Highway)	Genito Road	Nottoway County Line	
Prince George	12.36	19.89	SR 106/SR 724	Laurel Springs Road Pole Run Road	SR 10 (James River Drive)	Gap between segments ending at different points along SR 156 Gap between segments ending at different points along SR 618
Prince William	2.33	3.75	Manassas Park City Limits	Blooms Quarry Lane Old Centreville Road	Fairfax County Line	
Pulaski	0.20	0.32	SR 600 (Belspring Road)	Blair Road	Dead End	
Rappahannock	2.60	4.18	SR 626 (Scrabble Road)	Castleton View Road	SR 617 (Castleton Ford Road)	
Richmond	3.90	6.28	SR 612 (Oakland Road)	Luttrellville Lane	Northumberland County Line	
Roanoke	0.62	1.00	SR 601 (Hollins Road)	Carlos Drive	SR 605 (Old Mountain Road)	
Rockbridge	1.00	1.61	SR 42 (Virginia Avenue)	Hunters Crossing Road	Dead End	
Rockingham	2.10	3.38	SR 617 (Evergreen Valley Road)	Ridge Road	Shenandoah County Line	
Russell	6.75	10.86	Dead End	Carbo Road Train Station Road Carbo Road Cheney Creek	SR 63/Dickenson County Line	Gap between segments ending at different points along SR 615
Scott	0.80	1.29	SR 615	Willow Branch Road	Washington County Line	
Shenandoah	4.20	6.76	Rockingham County Line	Ridge Road	SR 767 (Qucksburg Road)	
Smyth	0.80	1.29	SR 615 (Citizens Road)	Parsonage Avenue	Wythe County Line	
Southampton	22.63	36.42	SR 35 (Main Street)	Ivor Road Main Street Proctors Bridge Road	SR 621 (Proctors Bridge Road)	Formerly SR 312 Gap between segments ending at different points along US 460
Spotsylvania	2.29	3.69	SR 610 (Elys Ford Road)	US Ford Road	SR 620 (Spottswood Furnace Road)	
Stafford	9.82	15.80	US 17 (Warrenton Road)	Poplar Road	Fauquier County Line	
Surry	13.29	21.39	SR 615 (Carsley Road)	New Design Road Golden Hill Road	SR 633 (Chippokes Farm Road)	Gap between segments ending at different points along SR 622 Gap between segments ending at different points along SR 626
Sussex	4.60	7.40	SR 656	Unnamed road	Dinwiddie County Line	Gap between segments ending at different points along SR 619
Tazewell	6.93	11.15	Dead End	Smith Ridge Road Jewell Ridge Road Bearwallow Road	SR 622	
Warren	1.60	2.57	SR 678 (Fort Valley Road)	Unnamed road	SR 610 (Bucks Mill Road)	
Washington	15.43	24.83	Scott County Line	Willow Branch Road Little Wolf Run Road Walnut Grove Road Caney Valley Road Little Creek Road	SR 626 (Large Hollow Road)	Gap between segments ending at different points along SR 622 Gap between segments ending at different points along SR 614
Westmoreland	3.65	5.87	SR 203 (Oldhams Road)	Tavern Run Road	SR 612 (Tavern Run Road)	
Wise	2.40	3.86	Dead End	Unnamed road	SR 612	
Wythe	3.92	6.31	Smyth County Line	Unnamed road Murphyville Road Parsonage Avenue Baumgardner Avenue Railroad Avenue Unnamed road	SR 675	Gap between segments ending at different points along SR 674
York	0.50	0.80	SR 620 (Link Road)	Patricks Creek Road	Dead End	
