= Virginia State Route 614 =

State highway in Virginia, United States

State Route 614

Route information
- Maintained by VDOT

Location
- Country: United States
- State: Virginia

Highway system
- Virginia Routes; Interstate; US; Primary; Secondary; Byways; History; HOT lanes

State Route 614 (SR 614) in the U.S. state of Virginia is a secondary route designation applied to multiple discontinuous road segments among the many counties. The list below describes the sections in each county that are designated SR 614.

== List ==
County	Length (mi)	Length (km)	From	Via	To	Notes
Accomack	6.99	11.25	Dead End	Craddock Neck Road Shell Bridge Road Wayside Drive Hickman Street	US 13 (Lankford Highway)	Gap between SR 615 and SR 178 Gap between segments ending at different points along SR 619
Albemarle	11.41	18.36	Dead End	Sugar Hollow Road Garth Road	SR 676 (Owensville Road)	Gap between segments ending at different points along SR 810
Alleghany	2.89	4.65	SR 600	Castile Road	SR 18 (Potts Creek Road)	
Amelia	8.78	14.13	Nottoway County Line	Dennisville Road Otterburn Road	US 360 Bus (Goodes Bridge Road)	
Amherst	1.00	1.61	SR 610 (Turkey Mountain Road)	Moses Mountain Road	Dead End	
Appomattox	7.32	11.78	SR 616 (Old Grist Mill Road)	Looner Den Road Forbes Road	Buckingham County Line	Gap between segments ending at different points along SR 618
Augusta	1.92	3.09	US 340 (East Side Highway)	Paine Run Road	Dead End	
Bath	14.73	23.71	US 220 (Stuart Highway)	Muddy Run Road	Highland County Line	Gap between segments ending at different points along SR 678
Bedford	5.10	8.21	SR 680 (Murrells Gap Road)	Sheep Creek Road	Blue Ridge Parkway	
Bland	12.70	20.44	Tazewell County Line	Grapefield Road	US 52 (North Scenic Highway)	
Botetourt	9.87	15.88	Dead End	Jennings Creek Road Arcadia Road	FR 54 (Frontage Road)	
Brunswick	4.00	6.44	SR 634 (Liberty Road)	Beaver Dam Road Pitch Kettle Road Beaver Dam Road	SR 628 (Red Oak Road/Little Mount Road)	
Buchanan	5.00	8.05	SR 604 (Poplar Gap Road)	Unnamed road	SR 609 (Bull Creek Road)	
Buckingham	1.60	2.57	Appomattox County Line	Forbes Road	SR 636 (Francisco Road)	
Campbell	2.80	4.51	SR 635 (McIver Ferry Road/Melrose Road)	McIver Ferry Road	SR 633 (Epsons Road)	
Caroline	2.00	3.22	US 17 (Tidewater Trail)	Ware Creek Road	Dead End	Gap between segments ending at different points along SR 615
Carroll	2.70	4.35	Dead End	Elk Spur Road	SR 608 (Lightning Ridge Road)	
Charles City	9.04	14.55	Dead End	Sturgeon Point Road	Dead End	
Charlotte	0.50	0.80	SR 59	Friend-Leigh Road	Dead End	
Chesterfield	0.82	1.32	SR 608 (Reymet Road)	Coach Road	SR 613 (Willis Road)	
Clarke	0.48	0.77	Dead End	Josephine Street	SR 616 (Church Street)	
Craig	3.92	6.31	SR 615 (Craigs Creek Road)	Unnamed road Hawkins Lane Unnamed road	SR 606 (Caldwell Mountain Road)	
Culpeper	2.30	3.70	Madison County Line	Locust Dale Road	SR 615 (Rapidan Road)	
Cumberland	2.10	3.38	Dead End	Taylor Road Bradley Road	Dead End	
Dickenson	5.03	8.10	SR 607 (Lyall Ridge)	The Lake Road Cowpath Road Flannagan Dam Road	SR 63 (Big Ridge Road)	
Dinwiddie	1.53	2.46	SR 40 (McKenney Highway)	Sunnyside Drive	SR 40 (Doyle Boulevard)	
Essex	0.18	0.29	SR 684 (Howerton Road)	Arlington Lodge Road	US 360 (Richmond Highway)	
Fairfax	1.56	2.51	Dead End	Evans Ford Road	Dead End	
Fauquier	0.60	0.97	Stafford County Line	Elk Ridge Road	SR 616 (Bristersburg Road)	
Floyd	1.40	2.25	SR 672 (Laurel Creek Road)	Lovell Road	Montgomery County Line	
Fluvanna	2.30	3.70	Dead End	Teppee Town Road	SR 612 (Winnsville Drive)	
Franklin	0.50	0.80	Dead End	Apple Road	SR 613 (Naff Road)	
Frederick	2.06	3.32	SR 600 (Hayfield Road/Back Mountain Road)	Back Mountain Road	US 50 (Northwestern Pike)	
Giles	0.50	0.80	Dead End	Seven Oaks Road	SR 42 (Blue Grass Trail)	
Gloucester	15.37	24.74	Dead End	Robins Neck Road Featherbed Lane Hickory Fork Road	SR 610 (Pinetta Road)	Gap between segments ending at different points along US 17
Goochland	3.95	6.36	SR 6 (River Road)	Dogtown Road	SR 673 (Whitehall Road)	
Grayson	0.40	0.64	SR 659 (Tiny Wood Lane/Valley View Road)	Valley View Road	US 21/SR 791	
Greene	3.20	5.15	SR 628 (Simmons Gap Road)	Brokenback Mountain Road	SR 627 (Bacon Hollow Road)	
Greensville	7.13	11.47	Emporia City Limits	Crescent Road Otterdam Road	SR 610 (Allen Road)	Gap between segments ending at different points along SR 616
Halifax	6.53	10.51	SR 716 (Rodgers Chapel Road)	Love Shop Road Temple Hill Road Burton Road	SR 610 (Clays Mill Road)	Gap between segments ending at different points along SR 613
Hanover	2.48	3.99	US 301/SR 2 (Hanover Courthouse Road)	Normans Bridge Road	King William County Line	
Henry	2.85	4.59	SR 610 (Axton Road)	Anchor Road Sandy River Road	Pittsylvania County Line	
Highland	20.72	33.35	Bath County Line	Unnamed road	West Virginia State Line	
Isle of Wight	9.55	15.37	SR 641 (Colosse Road)	Ballard Road River Run Trail Thomas Woods Trail	Southampton County Line	Gap between segments ending at different points along US 258 Gap between segments ending at different points along SR 603
James City	9.96	16.03	FR-665	Greensprings Road Centerville Road	US 60 (Richmond Road)	Gap between segments ending at different points along SR 5
King and Queen	15.55	25.03	Dead End	Clifton Lane Devils 3 Jump Road Rock Spring Road Poplar Grove Road	SR 617 (Exol Road/White House Lane)	Gap between segments ending at different points along SR 610
King George	3.49	5.62	Dead End	Potomac Drive Owens Drive	SR 624 (Mathias Point Road)	
King William	5.67	9.12	Hanover County Line	Etna Mills Road	SR 604 (Dabneys Mill Road)	
Lancaster	3.20	5.15	SR 604 (Merry Point Road)	Devils Bottom Road	SR 3 (Mary Ball Road)	
Lee	2.56	4.12	SR 654 (Hurricane Road)	Sandy Ridge Road	SR 70 (Trail of the Lonesome Pine)	
Loudoun	1.60	2.57	SR 606 (Old Ox Road)	Beaver Meador Road	Washington Dulles International Airport	
Louisa	5.29	8.51	SR 618 (Fredericks Halls Road)	Elk Creek Road Carrs Bridge Road Carrs Bridge Lane	Dead End	Gap between segments ending at different points along SR 652
Lunenburg	2.90	4.67	SR 635 (Oral Oaks Road)	Unity Road	SR 637 (Craig Mill Road)	
Madison	6.90	11.10	SR 607 (Elly Road)	John Tucker Road Twymans Mill Road Locust Dale Road	Culpeper County Line	Gap between segments ending at different points along US 15 (James Madison Highway)
Mathews	4.60	7.40	Dead End	Williams Wharf Road Ridgefield Road	SR 609 (Bethel Beach Road)	Gap between segments ending at different points along SR 14
Mecklenburg	0.80	1.29	Dead End	Cannons Ferry Road	SR 903	
Middlesex	1.30	2.09	US 17 (Tidewater Trail)	Forest Chapel Road	US 17 (Tidewater Trail)	
Montgomery	0.40	0.64	Floyd County Line	Tanbank Road	SR 612 (High Rock Hill Road)	
Nelson	1.40	2.25	SR 616 (Hickory Creek Road)	Perkins Hollow Lane	Dead End	
New Kent	1.40	2.25	SR 608 (Old River Road)	White House Road	Dead End	
Northampton	1.25	2.01	Dead End	James Wharf Road	SR 183 (Occohannock Neck Road)	
Northumberland	6.30	10.14	SR 600 (Ridge Road)	Walmsley Road Lake Road	Dead End	Gap between segments ending at different points along US 360
Nottoway	10.47	16.85	SR 625/SR 726 (Walnut Hill Road)	Courthouse Road Cellar Creek Road	Amelia County Line	Gap between segments ending at different points along SR 731
Orange	3.98	6.41	SR 611 (Zoar Road)	Gov Almond Road	SR 603 (Indian Town Road)	
Page	1.87	3.01	US 340	Shuler Lane	SR 615	
Patrick	17.50	28.16	SR 103 (Claudville Highway)	Unity Church Road Squirrel Spur Road	Dead End	
Pittsylvania	7.29	11.73	SR 615 (Dees Road)	Sandy River Road Sugar Barbour Road Silas Dodd Lane	SR 844 (Mount Cross Road)	Gap between segments ending at different points along SR 841 Gap between segments ending at different points along SR 939
Powhatan	7.85	12.63	SR 628 (Red Lane Road)	Mill Road Judes Ferry Road	Dead End	Gap between segments ending at different points along SR 613
Prince Edward	0.60	0.97	Dead End	Scott Road	SR 696 (Green Bay Road)	
Prince George	5.10	8.21	SR 10 (James River Drive)	Nobles Road Wards Creek Road	SR 10 (James River Drive)	
Prince William	1.12	1.80	SR 612/SR 663	Evans Ford Road	Dead End	
Pulaski	0.70	1.13	SR 617 (Neck Creek Road)	Ferrell Road	Dead End	
Rappahannock	4.30	6.92	Dead End	keyser Run Road	SR 622 (Girdbrown Hollow Road)	
Richmond	8.46	13.62	Dead End	Suggetts Point Road Beaver Dam Road Folly Neck Road Boswell Road	Dead End	
Roanoke	1.63	2.62	Franklin County Line	Boones Chapel Road	SR 615 (Starlight Lane)	Gap between segments ending at different points along SR 677
Rockbridge	4.32	6.95	Dead End	Bells Valley Road	SR 601	Gap between segments ending at different points along SR 42
Rockingham	2.92	4.70	SR 881 (Orchard Drive)	Mechanicsville Road	Shenandoah County Line	
Russell	11.39	18.33	SR 676 (Clinch Mountain Road)	Old Postal Road Crossroads Carterton Road	SR 628 (Heralds Valley Road)	Gap between US 58 Alt and US 19 Gap between segments ending at different points along SR 640
Scott	31.78	51.14	Tennessee State Line	Unnamed road Yuma Road River Road Unnamed road Nottingham Road Unnamed road Hilton Road Unnamed road A P Carter Highway	Washington County Line	Gap between segments ending at different points along US 23 Gap between segments ending at different points along US 58
Shenandoah	13.87	22.32	Rockingham County Line	South Middle Road	US 11 (Old Valley Pike)	
Smyth	8.00	12.87	SR 695 (Slimpcreek Road)	Cedar Springs Road	SR 749 (Cedar Springs Road)	
Southampton	8.95	14.40	SR 616 (Ivor Road)	Seacock Chapel Road	Isle of Wight County Line	Gap between segments ending at different points along SR 635
Spotsylvania	7.25	11.67	Dead End	Breaknock Road Dickerson Road Duerson Lane	SR 738 (Partlow Road)	Gap between segments ending at different points along SR 601
Stafford	3.66	5.89	SR 612 (Hartwood Road)	Spotted Tavern Road Cropp Road	Fauquier County Line	
Surry	5.93	9.54	SR 615 (Carsley Road)	Three Bridge Road New Design Road	SR 630 (Mill Road/Spatley Road)	Gap between segments ending at different points along SR 603 Gap between segments ending at different points along SR 615
Sussex	5.30	8.53	SR 606	Walnut Hill Road Unnamed road	SR 603	
Tazewell	1.42	2.29	Bland County Line	Grapefield Road Mill Road	Dead End	Gap between segments ending at different points along SR 61
Warren	2.00	3.22	SR 626 (Toten Lane)	Unnamed road	SR 626	Gap between segments ending at different points along SR 55
Washington	20.97	33.75	Scott County Line	AP Carter Highway Swinging Bridge Road Barnrock Road Appaloosa Road Smith Creek Road Mountain Spring Road Childress Hollow Road	SR 662 (Spring Valley Road)	Gap between a Dead End and SR 798 Gap between a Dead End and SR 624 Gap between segments ending at different points along SR 700 Gap between segments ending at different points along SR 633
Westmoreland	2.50	4.02	SR 600 (Nomini Hall Road)	Weldons Drive	SR 616 (Tavern Run Road)	
Wise	2.03	3.27	US 23	Unnamed road	Big Stone Gap Town Limits	Gap between segments ending at different points along US 23 Bus
Wythe	2.70	4.35	SR 613	Ramsey Mountain Road	SR 121	
York	1.49	2.40	US 17 (George Washington Memorial Highway)	Showalter Road	SR 620 (Lakeside Drive)	
