= Virginia State Route 605 =

State highway in Virginia, United States

State Route 605

Route information
- Maintained by VDOT

Location
- Country: United States
- State: Virginia

Highway system
- Virginia Routes; Interstate; US; Primary; Secondary; Byways; History; HOT lanes

State Route 605 (SR 605) in the U.S. state of Virginia is a secondary route designation applied to multiple discontinuous road segments among the many counties. The list below describes the sections in each county that are designated SR 605.

== List ==
County	Length (mi)	Length (km)	From	Via	To	Notes
Accomack	18.63	29.98	Dead End	Upshur Neck Road Bradfords Neck Road Drummontown Road Seaside Road	US 13 Bus (Front Street)	Gap between segments ending at different points on SR 600
Albemarle	2.20	3.54	Greene County Line	Durrett Ridge Road	SR 743 (Advance Mills Road)	
Alleghany	4.75	7.64	SR 666 (East Morris Hill Road)	Coles Mountain Road	Bath County Line	
Amelia	0.44	0.71	US 360 Bus (Goodes Bridge Road)	Wayside Avenue	US 360 Bus	
Amherst	5.45	8.77	US 60 (Lexington Turnpike)	Pedlar River Road	Rockbridge County Line	
Appomattox	13.89	22.35	SR 727 (Stone Ridge Road)	Dreaming Creek Road Beckham Road James River Road Riverside Drive	Buckingham County Line	Gap between SR 26 and US 60
Augusta	3.50	5.63	SR 608 (Battlefield Road)	Mount Horeb Road Fountain Cave Road Lee Roy Road	Rockingham County Line	Gap between segments ending at different points on SR 865 Gap between segments ending at different points on SR 256
Bath	2.40	3.86	Alleghany County Line	Coles Mountain Road	SR 687	
Bedford	0.20	0.32	Dead End	Folkes Street	SR 610 (Sunset Hill Road)	
Bland	1.60	2.57	Dead End	Main Street	SR 98 (Main Street)	
Botetourt	3.96	6.37	Roanoke County Line	Sanderson Drive Cougar Drive Coaling Road	SR 652 (Mountain Pass Road)	Gap between segments ending at different points along SR 654
Brunswick	2.20	3.54	SR 606 (Belfield Road)	Lewis Drive	Greensville County Line	
Buchanan	6.52	10.49	SR 80	Russell Fork	SR 658	
Buckingham	8.45	13.60	Appomattox County Line	River Road Cunningham Road	Dead End	
Campbell	9.33	15.02	SR 633 (Epsons Road)	Whipping Creek Road Swinging Bridge Road	SR 40 (Wickliffe Avenue)	
Caroline	11.44	18.41	Spotsylvania County Line	Marye Road Paige Road	SR 2 (Main Street)	
Carroll	0.28	0.45	Grayson County Line	Eagle Bottom Road	SR 94 (Ivanhoe Road)	
Charlotte	3.52	5.66	SR 608 (Tobacco Hill Road)	Whitlow Road Rutledge Road	Mecklenburg County Line	Gap between segments ending at different points along US 15
Chesterfield	5.24	8.43	SR 603 (Skinquarter Road)	Moseley Road	Powhatan County Line	Gap between segments ending at different points along SR 604
Clarke	2.61	4.20	SR 649 (Frogtown Road)	Morgans Mill Road	SR 601 (Blue Ridge Mountain Road)	
Craig	1.62	2.61	Dead End	Red Brush Road	SR 611 (Peaceful Valley Road)	
Culpeper	2.00	3.22	Madison County Line	Major Brown Drive	Rappahannock County Line	
Cumberland	4.40	7.08	SR 690 (Columbia Road)	Boston Hill Road	SR 602 (Ampt Hill Road)	
Dickenson	4.40	7.08	SR 80 (Helen Henderson Highway)	Unnamed road	Buchanan County Line	
Dinwiddie	12.20	19.63	US 1 (Boydton Plank Road)	Hunnicut Road Old Vaughan Road Old Stage Road Monks Neck Road Ellington Road	Prince George County Line	Gap between segments ending at different points along SR 669 Gap between segments ending at different points along SR 604
Essex	1.10	1.77	SR 684 (Howerton Road)	White Marsh Road	SR 684	
Fairfax	1.03	1.66	Dead End	Horse Pen Road Unnamed road Rock Hill Road	Loudoun County Line	Gap between a dead end and SR 5320 Gap between dead ends
Fauquier	11.76	18.93	SR 628 (Blantyre Road)	Airlie Road Dumfries Road	Prince William County Line	
Floyd	5.15	8.29	SR 726 (Black Ridge Road)	Fairview Church Road Happy Valley Road Old Furnace Road	SR 726 (Black Ridge Road)	Gap between segments ending at different points along SR 720 Gap between segments ending at different points along SR 724
Fluvanna	3.19	5.13	SR 659 (Stage Junction Road)	Shannon Hill Road	Goochland County Line	
Franklin	12.76	20.54	SR 40/SR 788 (Franklin Street)	Henry Road	US 220 (Virgil H Goode Highway)	Gap between segments ending at different points along SR 606
Frederick	0.50	0.80	West Virginia State Line	Fairview Church Road	SR 733 (Fairview Road)	
Giles	6.44	10.36	SR 625 (Goodwins Ferry Road)	Spruce Run Road	US 460/SR 42 (Virginia Avenue)	
Gloucester	6.84	11.01	SR 3 (John Clayton Memorial Highway)	Crab Thicket Road Indian Road Hornets Nest Road	SR 606 (Harcum Road)	Gap between segments ending at different points along SR 606
Goochland	7.68	12.36	Fluvanna County Line	Shannon Hill Road	Louisa County Line	Gap between segments ending at different points along US 250
Grayson	0.80	1.29	SR 644 (Freedom Lane)	Eagle Bottom Road	Carroll County Line	
Greene	0.21	0.34	Albemarle County Line	Durrett Ridge Road	SR 604 (Celt Road)	
Greensville	10.25	16.50	Brunswick County Line	Roger Road Unnamed road Chapmans Ford Road Unnamed road	Dead End	Gap between segments ending at different points along SR 607 Gap between segments ending at different points along SR 606 Gap between segments ending at different points along SR 608
Halifax	2.38	3.83	SR 607 (Rodgers Chapel Road)	Mill Road	SR 746 (Mount Laurel Road)	
Hanover	11.40	18.35	US 301/SR 2 (Hanover Courthouse Road)	River Road	US 360 (Mechanicsville Turnpike)	
Henry	0.51	0.82	Franklin County Line	Henry Road	Franklin County Line	
Highland	1.00	1.61	US 220	Unnamed road	Dead End	
Isle of Wight	6.54	10.53	US 258 (Courthouse Road)	Iron Mine Springs Road Murphy Mill Road	SR 603 (Everets Road)	Gap between segments ending at different points along SR 637
James City	1.00	1.61	SR 607 (Sycamore Landing Road/Croaker Road)	Croaker Landing	Dead End	
King and Queen	9.48	15.26	Dead End	Chain Ferry Road York River Road Plain View Lane	SR 14 (Buena Vista Road)	
King George	4.35	7.00	Dead End	LaGrange Lane Bloomsbury Road Chapel Way	SR 603	
King William	8.49	13.66	Dead End	Old Newcastle Road Manfield Road	SR 604 (Dabneys Mill Road)	
Lancaster	1.90	3.06	SR 3 (Mary Ball Road)	Pinckardville Road	SR 615 (Crawfords Corner Road)	
Lee	1.40	2.25	Dead End	Old Zion Road	Wise County Line	
Loudoun	1.03	1.66	Fairfax County Line	Rock Hill Road Old Ox Road	Cul-de-Sac	Gap between segments ending at different points along SR 606
Louisa	10.31	16.59	Goochland County Line	Shannon Hill Road Willis Proffitt Road	US 522 (Pendelton Road)	
Lunenburg	2.20	3.54	SR 137	Switchback Road	SR 645 (Jonesboro Road)	
Madison	4.90	7.89	Dead End	Pullen Lane Novum Church Road Parish Road	Culpeper County Line	Gap between segments ending at different points along SR 609
Mathews	2.00	3.22	Dead End	Old Creek House Road	SR 607 (Gully Branch Road)	Gap between segments ending at different points along SR 14
Mecklenburg	1.10	1.77	SR 609 (Trottinridge Road)	Dairy Farm Road	Charlotte County Line	
Middlesex	3.52	5.66	US 17 (Tidewater Trail)	Canoe House Road	Dead End	
Montgomery	0.90	1.45	Pulaski County Line	Little River Road	Radford City Limits	
Nelson	1.10	1.77	Dead End	Peavine Lane	SR 639 (Laurel Road)	
New Kent	1.16	1.87	Dead End	Egypt Road	SR 249 (New Kent Highway)	
Northampton	2.00	3.22	SR 606 (Wardtown Road)	Milton Ames Drive Brickhouse Drive	US 13 (Lankford Highway)	Gap between segments ending at different points along SR 618
Northumberland	7.93	12.76	Lancaster County Line	Mount Olive Road	Dead End	
Nottoway	2.25	3.62	SR 609 (Yellowbird Road)	Daniel Road	SR 660 (Poplar Lawn Road)	
Orange	1.20	1.93	SR 621 (Old Plank Road)	Barnes Road	Dead End	
Page	2.15	3.46	SR 611	Beahm Lane	SR 662 (Rileyville Road)	
Patrick	0.70	1.13	Dead End	C C Camp Lane	SR 8 (Woolwine Highway)	
Pittsylvania	20.59	33.14	SR 703 (Irish Road)	Marion Road Walkers Well Road Toshes Road	Dead End	Gap between segments ending at different points along SR 612 Gap between segments ending at different points along SR 57
Powhatan	1.60	2.57	SR 622 (Dorset Road)	Moseley Road	Chesterfield County Line	
Prince Edward	3.11	5.01	SR 696 (Green Bay Road)	Gates Bass Road Lakeview Road Fairlea Road	SR 600 (Rices Depot Road)	Gap between segments ending at the Sandy River Reservoir
Prince George	2.41	3.88	Dinwiddie County Line	Spain Road	I-95/Service Road	
Prince William	0.66	1.06	SR 657 (Reid Lane)	Fauquier Drive	SR 28 (Nokesville Road)	
Pulaski	7.40	11.91	SR 693 (Lead Mine Road)	Little River Dam Road	Montgomery County Line	
Rappahannock	0.70	1.13	Culpeper County Line	Major Brown Drive	SR 707 (Slate Mills Road)	
Richmond	1.70	2.74	SR 606 (Simonson Road)	Edge Hill Road	Dead End	
Roanoke	2.37	3.81	Roanoke City Limits	Old Mountain Road Sanderson Drive	Botetourt County Line	Gap between segments ending at different points along SR 627
Rockbridge	2.30	3.70	Amherst County Line	Nettle Creek Road	SR 603 (Irish Creek Road)	
Rockingham	2.85	4.59	Augusta County Line	Leroy Road Main Street	SR 1602 (The Point Street)	
Russell	2.83	4.55	SR 604 (Molls Creek Road)	Porter Hollow Road	SR 609 (High Point Road)	
Scott	0.30	0.48	SR 601	Blue Pond Lane	Dead End	
Shenandoah	8.69	13.99	Dead End	Unnamed road Saint Luke Road Unnamed road	Dead End	Gap between segments ending at different points along the boundary of the George Washington National Forest Gap between segments ending at different points along SR 681 Gap between segments ending at different points along SR 682 Gap between segments ending at different points along US 11
Smyth	3.58	5.76	Washington County Line	Unnamed road Wet Springs Road	SR 645 (Saint Clares Creek Road)	Gap between segments ending at different points along SR 600
Southampton	8.69	13.99	Sussex County Line	Mill Field Road Millfield Road	SR 614 (Seacock Chapel Road)	Gap between segments ending at different points along SR 628
Spotsylvania	12.17	19.59	Dead End	Swift Road Wallers Road Marye Road	Caroline County Line	Gap between segments ending at different points along SR 622 Gap between segments ending at different points along SR 738
Stafford	2.90	4.67	SR 218 (White Oak Road)	New Hope Church Road	Dead End	
Surry	2.35	3.78	SR 618 (Southwick Road)	Walkers Road	SR 622 (Runnymeade Road)	
Sussex	1.70	2.74	SR 606 (Union Hill Road)	Barrett Church Road	Southampton County Line	
Tazewell	0.45	0.72	Dead End	Heartland Road	SR 602 (Pleasant Hill Church Road)	
Warren	1.70	2.74	US 340 (Stonewall Jackson Highway)	Poor House Road	SR 649 (Browntown Road)	
Washington	10.07	16.21	SR 91	Widener Valley Road	Smyth County Line	
Westmoreland	0.35	0.56	Dead End	Dinks Mill Road	SR 604 (Sandy Point Road)	
Wise	1.05	1.69	Lee County Line	Unnamed road	US 58 Alt	
Wythe	2.83	4.55	SR 94	Dunford Road	SR 94	
York	0.12	0.19	SR 641 (Penniman Road)	Winthrop Road	SR 609 (Burnham Road)	
