= Virginia State Route 609 =

State highway in Virginia, United States

State Route 609

Route information
- Maintained by VDOT

Location
- Country: United States
- State: Virginia

Highway system
- Virginia Routes; Interstate; US; Primary; Secondary; Byways; History; HOT lanes

State Route 609 (SR 609) in the U.S. state of Virginia is a secondary route designation applied to multiple discontinuous road segments among the many counties. The list below describes the sections in each county that are designated SR 609.

== List ==
County	Length (mi)	Length (km)	From	Via	To	Notes
Accomack	15.06	24.24	SR 181 (Main Street)	Main Street Big Pine Road Waterfield Street Michael Hill Road Beacon Road Brickhouse Drive Pennsylvania Avenue Church Road	US 13 Bus (Front Street)	
Albemarle	1.40	2.25	SR 671 (Ballard Mills Road)	Wesley Chapel Road	SR 665 (Millington Road)	
Alleghany	1.80	2.90	Dead End	Vine Patch Road	SR 18 (Potts Creek Road)	
Amelia	9.36	15.06	US 360 (Patrick Henry Highway)	Grub Hill Church Road Royalton Road	Powhatan County Line	Gap between segments ending at different points along SR 616
Amherst	0.90	1.45	SR 610 (New Glasgow Road)	Stove Hill Road	Dead End	
Appomattox	2.50	4.02	Campbell County Line	Phoebe Pond Road Stage Road	Campbell County Line	Gap between crossings of the Campbell County Line
Augusta	0.25	0.40	SR 651 (Churchmans Mill Road)	Old Draft Road	SR 608 (Tinkling Spring Road)	
Bath	13.68	22.02	SR 39 (Mountain Valley Road)	Dry Run Road	Highland County Line	
Bedford	2.18	3.51	SR 811 (Thomas Jefferson Road)	Rustic Village Road Gumtree Road	Dead End	
Bland	1.80	2.90	SR 608 (Wesendonick Road)	Dinky Track Road	SR 677 (No Business Creek Road)	
Botetourt	1.68	2.70	SR 608 (Gilmers Mill Road)	Forest Oaks Lane	Rockbridge County Line	
Brunswick	5.10	8.21	SR 712 (Old Stage Road)	Cutbank Road	Dinwiddie County Line	
Buchanan	8.26	13.29	Dickenson County Line	King Solomon Colley Road Bull Creek Road	US 460	
Buckingham	11.22	18.06	Prince Edward County Line	Crumptown Road New Stone Road	US 15 (James Madison Highway)	Gap between segments ending at different points along SR 636
Campbell	4.25	6.84	SR 726 (Mount Athos Road)	Stage Road Phoebe Pond Road	SR 24 (Village Highway)	Gap between SR 607 and Appomattox County Line Gap between crossings of the Appomattox County Line
Caroline	8.60	13.84	SR 2 (Fredericksburg Turnpike)	Woodslane Road Rozell Road Macedonia Road	Spotsylvania County Line	Gap between segments ending at different points along SR 626 Gap between segments ending at different points along SR 606
Carroll	0.60	0.97	Grayson County Line	Peaks Mountain Road	SR 608	
Charles City	10.20	16.42	SR 5 (John Tyler Memorial Highway)	Barnetts Road	SR 106 (Roxbury Road)	
Charlotte	3.30	5.31	SR 607 (Moody Creek Road)	Robertson Road	Mecklenburg County Line	
Chesterfield	1.36	2.19	SR 10 (Iron Bridge Road)	Old Centralia Road	SR 717 (Centralia Road)	
Clarke	0.60	0.97	SR 608	Cannon Ball Road	SR 612 (Shepherds Mill Road)	
Craig	2.18	3.51	SR 615 (Craigs Creek Road)	Sand Plant Road	SR 611 (Peaceful Valley Road)	
Culpeper	2.00	3.22	Madison County Line	Hoover Road	US 29 (James Monroe Highway)	
Cumberland	1.60	2.57	SR 610 (Duncan Store Road)	Sportslake Road	SR 608 (Royal Oak Road)	
Dickenson	1.00	1.61	SR 768 (King Solomon Colley Road)	King Solomon Colley Road	Buchanan County Line	
Dinwiddie	13.88	22.34	Brunswick County Line	Cherry Hill Road Old Stage Road Cherry Hill Road Old Stage Road	SR 670 (Old Stage Road/Shady Lane)	Gap between segments ending at different points along SR 619
Essex	3.89	6.26	SR 612 (Brizendine Lane/Essex Mill Road)	Essex Mill Road	US 17 (Tidewater Trail)	
Fairfax	6.12	9.85	US 29 (Lee Highway)	Pleasant Valley Road	US 50 (Lee Jackson Memorial Highway)	
Fauquier	1.80	2.90	SR 806 (Elk Run Road)	Courthouse Road	SR 612 (Brent Town Road)	
Floyd	0.11	0.18	Patrick County Line	Belcher Mountain Road Fisher View Road	Montgomery County Line	Gap between SR 758 and SR 610
Fluvanna	3.44	5.54	SR 606 (Hells Bend Road/Rivanna Mills Road)	Hells Bend Road	SR 615 (Carysbrook Road)	
Franklin	1.99	3.20	Henry County Line	Country Ridge Road	US 220 (Virgil H Goode Highway)	
Frederick	1.04	1.67	SR 55 (Wardensville Pike)	Capon Springs Grade	West Virginia State Line	
Giles	0.25	0.40	Dead End	Hidden Hills Lane	SR 605 (Spruce Run Road)	
Gloucester	1.45	2.33	Dead End	Woodstock Road	SR 610 (Davenport Road)	
Goochland	5.30	8.53	SR 603 (Tabscott Road)	Hickory Hill Road Three Chopt Road	US 250 (Broad Street)	Gap between segments ending at different points along SR 606
Grayson	5.10	8.21	Blue Ridge Parkway	Peaks Mountain Road	Carroll County Line	
Greene	7.15	11.51	US 33 (Spotswood Trail)	Fredericksburg Road	Orange County Line	Former State Route 243
Greensville	1.72	2.77	US 301	Unnamed road	Sussex County Line	
Halifax	5.70	9.17	SR 610 (Clays Mill Road)	Abbott Hill Road West Store Road	SR 603 (Hunting Creek Road)	Gap between segments ending at different points along SR 621
Hanover	2.02	3.25	SR 632 (Crown Hill Road)	Parsleys Mill Road	Dead End	
Henry	13.68	22.02	SR 687 (Stone Dairy Road)	Dillons Fork Road Daniels Creek Road	SR 657 (Old Quarry Road/Rockwood Park Road)	Gap between SR 701 and SR 682
Highland	3.24	5.21	Bath County Line	Burnsville Road	SR 678 (Bullpasture River Road)	
Isle of Wight	5.50	8.85	Suffolk City Limits	Knoxville Road Sunset Drive Knoxville Road	SR 603	
James City	0.91	1.46	FR 136	Cedar Point Lane Unnamed road	SR 606 (Riverview Road)	Gap between segments ending at different points along SR 607
King and Queen	11.45	18.43	Dead End	Mount Olive Bottom Road Iris Road New Hope Road	SR 33 (Lewis Puller Memorial Highway)	Gap between segments ending at different points along SR 614 Gap between SR 603 and SR 610
King George	2.69	4.33	SR 3 (Kings Highway)	Comorn Road	SR 218 (Caledon Road)	
King William	5.85	9.41	SR 604 (Herring Creek Road)	Smokey Road	SR 600 (River Road)	
Lancaster	1.00	1.61	Dead End	Levelgreen Road	SR 604 (Ottoman Ferry Road)	
Lee	0.80	1.29	Tennessee State Line	Unnamed road	SR 610	
Loudoun	1.21	1.95	Fairfax County Line	Pleasant Valley Road	Washington Dulles International Airport	
Louisa	6.40	10.30	US 33 (Jefferson Highway)	Buckner Road	SR 618 (Fredericks Hall Road)	
Lunenburg	3.80	6.12	SR 613 (Brickland Road)	Afton Grove Road	SR 137 (Dundas Road)	
Madison	8.49	13.66	SR 651 (Aylor Road)	John Myers Road Hoover Road	Culpeper County Line	Gap between segments ending at different points along SR 231 Gap between segments ending at different points along SR 603
Mathews	3.10	4.99	SR 608 (Potato Neck Road)	Bethel Beach Road	Dead End	Gap between segments ending at different points along SR 720
Mecklenburg	12.90	20.76	SR 49	Trottinridge Road Tinker Road	Charlotte County Line	Gap between segments ending at different points along SR 640
Middlesex	1.84	2.96	SR 610 (Burchs Mill Road)	Gayles Road	SR 1030 (Cedar Road)	
Montgomery	11.81	19.01	Floyd County Line	Fishersview Road Alleghany Spring Road Willis Hollow Road Boone Road Boners Run Road Doosing Lane	SR 753 (Old Town Road)	Gap between segments ending at different points along SR 637 Gap between dead ends
Nelson	2.40	3.86	Dead End	Glass Hollow Road Mill Lane	SR 151	
New Kent	3.96	6.37	SR 106/SR 249	Old Church Road Talleyville Road	SR 608 (Old River Road)	
Northampton	1.32	2.12	SR 618 (Bayside Road)	Franktown Road	SR 600 (Seaside Road)	
Northumberland	6.80	10.94	Lancaster County Line	Browns Store Road Remo Road Harveys Neck Road	SR 1031 (Ingram Bay Drive)	
Nottoway	6.50	10.46	US 460/US 460 Bus	Yellowbird Road Green Hill Road	SR 610 (Cedar Hill Road)	
Orange	4.76	7.66	Greene County Line	Scuffletown Road	SR 20 (Constitution Highway)	
Page	0.80	1.29	Dead End	Unnamed road	SR 602 (Corner Town Road)	
Patrick	7.63	12.28	Floyd County Line	Belcher Mountain Road	SR 616 (Mill Houses Road)	
Pittsylvania	7.35	11.83	SR 672 (Pittsville Road)	Brights Road	Dead End	
Powhatan	2.80	4.51	Amelia County Line	Giles Bridge Road	SR 13 (Old Buckingham Road)	
Prince Edward	6.20	9.98	SR 627 (Hixburg Road)	Olive Branch Road Peaks Road	Buckingham County Line	Gap between segments ending at different points along SR 626
Prince George	5.77	9.29	SR 106/SR 156	Old Stage Road	SR 10 (James River Drive)	
Prince William	0.11	0.18	SR 642 (Hoadly Road)	Unnamed road	Dead End	
Pulaski	6.07	9.77	Wythe County Line	Stillwell Road Pine Run Road Boyd Road	Dead End	Gap between segments ending at different points along SR 100
Rappahannock	0.50	0.80	Dead End	Jobbers Mountain Road	SR 621 (Yancey Road)	
Richmond	1.35	2.17	Dead End	Mothershead Neck Road	SR 610 (Laurel Grove Road)	
Roanoke	1.33	2.14	SR 610 (West Ruritan Road)	Ruritan Road East Ruritan Road	US 460 (Challenger Avenue)	
Rockbridge	5.29	8.51	Botetourt County Line	Unnamed road Red Mill Road Unnamed road	SR 690 (Padgetts Hill Road)	Gap between segments ending at different points along FR 55 Gap between segments ending at different points along SR 692
Rockingham	3.40	5.47	US 340 (Stuart Avenue)	Naked Creek Road	SR 759 (Naked Creek Road/Fox Mountain Road)	
Russell	8.90	14.32	SR 610 (Sunny Point/Sabery Chapel Road)	West Bearwallow Road High Point Road	US 58 Alt	Gap between segments ending at different points along SR 686 Gap between segments ending at different points along SR 611 Gap between segments ending at different points along SR 604
Scott	0.27	0.43	Dead End	Unnamed road	SR 645 (Manville Road)	
Shenandoah	1.40	2.25	Dead End	Hollingsworth Road	SR 669 (Hottel Road)	
Smyth	3.10	4.99	Washington County Line	Fraizer Lane	Dead End	Gap between segments ending at different points along SR 774
Southampton	14.32	23.05	SR 735 (Courthouse Road/Three Creeks Road)	Pope Station Road	SR 693 (Garris Mill Road)	
Spotsylvania	3.37	5.42	Caroline County Line	Thornton Rolling Road Jim Morris Road	US 17 Bus/SR 2 (Tidewater Trail)	
Stafford	2.30	3.70	Cul-de-Sac	Raven Road	SR 608 (Brooke Road)	
Surry	5.25	8.45	SR 610 (Swanns Point Road)	River Road	SR 1203 (Spring Grove Road)	
Sussex	12.70	20.44	Greensville County Line	Unnamed road Lebanon Church Road Gray Road Unnamed road	SR 735 (Courthouse Road)	Gap between segments ending at different points along SR 611
Tazewell	11.60	18.67	SR 91 (Maiden Spring Road)	Wardell Road Kents Ridge Road	Richlands Town Limits	
Warren	1.54	2.48	SR 637 (Guard Hill Road)	Ritenour Hollow Road	SR 627 (Reliance Road)	
Washington	12.62	20.31	Abingdon Town Limits	Hillman Highway Maple Street Blue Hill Road Plum Creek Road	Smyth County Line	Gap between segments ending at different points along SR 80 Gap between SR 91 Bus and SR 752/SR 1309
Westmoreland	2.36	3.80	SR 622 (Stratford Hall Road)	Stratford Hall Road	SR 214 (Stratford Hall Road)	
Wise	2.75	4.43	SR 668	Unnamed road	SR 683 (Preston Road)	
Wythe	1.70	2.74	SR 618 (Reed Creek Drive)	Stillwell Road	Pulaski County Line	
York	0.33	0.53	Dead End	Burnham Road	SR 605 (Winthrop Road)	
