= Virginia State Route 610 =

State highway in Virginia, United States

State Route 610

Route information
- Maintained by VDOT

Location
- Country: United States
- State: Virginia

Highway system
- Virginia Routes; Interstate; US; Primary; Secondary; Byways; History; HOT lanes

State Route 610 (SR 610) in the U.S. state of Virginia is a secondary route designation applied to multiple discontinuous road segments among the many counties. The list below describes the sections in each county that are designated SR 610.

== List ==
County	Length (mi)	Length (km)	From	Via	To	Notes
Accomack	0.20	0.32	SR 688 (Gladding Road)	Unnamed road	SR 689 (Turkey Run Road)	
Albemarle	2.30	3.70	SR 20 (Stony Point Road)	Lonesome Mountain Road	Dead End	
Alleghany	0.94	1.51	SR 607	Unnamed road	SR 18 (Potts Creek Road)	Gap between segments ending at different points along SR 18 Gap between dead ends
Amelia	4.45	7.16	Nottoway County Line	Wills Road	SR 708 (Namozine Road)	
Amherst	28.98	46.64	SR 727 (Pera Road)	Pera Road Dancing Creek Road Puppy Creek Road Sandidges Road Turkey Mountain Road Fletchers Level Road New Glasgow Road Boxwood Farm Road	SR 739 (Honey Bee Drive)	Gap between segments ending at different points along SR 635 Gap between segments ending at different points along SR 778
Appomattox	1.80	2.90	Campbell County Line	Spencer Road	SR 670 (Arrowhead Road)	
Augusta	10.94	17.61	SR 608 (Draft Avenue/Cold Springs Road)	Howardsville Turnpike	Nelson County Line	
Bath	0.11	0.18	Dead End	West View Lane	SR 650 (Lee Roy Road)	
Bedford	0.40	0.64	US 501 (Lee Jackson Highway)	Sunset Hill Road	Dead End	
Bland	1.90	3.06	Smyth County Line	Nebo Road	SR 42 (Bluegrass Highway)	
Botetourt	1.03	1.66	Dead End	Chambers Road Plank Road	Rockbridge County Line	
Brunswick	2.09	3.36	SR 629 (Rawlings Road)	Baskerville Mill Road	Dinwiddie County Line	
Buchanan	9.02	14.52	SR 80	Conaway/Cow Fork	US 460	
Buckingham	12.34	19.86	SR 729 (Sunnyside Road)	Slate Hill Road Cartersville Road	Cumberland County Line	
Campbell	0.30	0.48	SR 609 (Stage Road)	Spencer Road	Appomattox County Line	
Caroline	4.73	7.61	SR 2 (Fredericksburg Turnpike)	Pepmeier Hill Road	US 17 (Tidewater Trail)	
Carroll	3.52	5.66	Patrick County Line	Terrys Mill Road	US 58 (Danville Pike)	Gap between segments ending at different points along SR 634
Charles City	1.82	2.93	Dead End	Green Oak Road	SR 155 (Courthouse Road)	
Charlotte	1.89	3.04	US 15 (Barnesville Highway)	Carrington Road	Mecklenburg County Line	
Chesterfield	0.22	0.35	Dead End	Jefferson Avenue	SR 746 (Enon Church Road)	
Clarke	1.30	2.09	US 340 (Lord Fairfax Highway)	Clifton Road	SR 641 (Lewisville Road)	
Craig	0.20	0.32	SR 615 (Craigs Creek Road)	Crossroads Boulevard	SR 611 (Peaceful Valley Road)	
Culpeper	12.05	19.39	SR 669 (Carrico Mills Road)	Maddens Tavern Road Eleys Ford Road	Spotsylvania County Line	
Cumberland	2.90	4.67	Buckingham County Line	Duncan Store Road	SR 690 (Columbia Road)	
Dickenson	0.62	1.00	Dead End	Leck Road	SR 644	
Dinwiddie	10.30	16.58	Brunswick County Line	Baskerville Mill Road Old White Oak Road	SR 613 (White Oak Road)	
Essex	3.18	5.12	SR 684 (Howerton Road)	Boston Road	US 17 (Tidewater Trail)	
Fairfax	4.03	6.49	Dead End	Wolf Run Shoals Road	SR 641 (Chapel Road)	Gap between segments ending at different points along SR 643
Fauquier	12.56	20.21	SR 28 (Catlett Road)	Third Street Midland Road Aquia Road Garrisonville Road	Stafford County Line	Gap between segments ending at different points along SR 616
Floyd	13.35	21.48	Montgomery County Line	Huffville Road Daniels Run Road Hummingbird Lane	Blue Ridge Parkway	Gap between segments ending at different points along SR 660 Gap between segments ending at different points along US 221
Fluvanna	3.53	5.68	Goochland County Line	Community House Road	SR 659 (Cedar Lane Road)	
Franklin	1.68	2.70	Dead End	Waters Edge Drive	Pittsylvania County Line	
Frederick	3.80	6.12	West Virginia State Line	Muse Road	US 50 (Northwestern Pike)	Gap between segments ending at different points along SR 707
Giles	0.80	1.29	Dead End	Albert Meredith Lane	SR 605 (Spruce Run Road)	
Gloucester	12.90	20.76	SR 606 (Ark Road)	Old Pinetta Road Pinetta Road Davenport Road Woods Cross Road Salem Church Road	SR 198 (Glenns Road)	
Goochland	5.70	9.17	Fluvanna County Line	Community House Road	SR 606 (Hadensville-Fife Road)	
Grayson	0.50	0.80	SR 785 (Fishers Gap Road)	Faith Drive	SR 89 (Skyline Highway)	
Greene	4.75	7.64	US 33 (Spotswood Trail)	Toms Road	SR 609 (Fredericksburg Road)	
Greensville	9.98	16.06	US 301	Slagles Lake Road Allen Road	SR 1101 (Grigg Avenue)	
Halifax	13.01	20.94	US 501 (L P Bailey Memorial Highway)	Murphy Grove Road Crystal Hill Road Clays Mill Road	SR 360 (Bethel Road)	Gap between segments ending at different points along SR 626
Hanover	6.73	10.83	Louisa County Line	Taylors Creek Road Bethany Church Road	US 33 (Mountain Road)	Gap between segments ending at different points along SR 677
Henry	9.46	15.22	North Carolina State Line	Axton Road	US 58 (A L Philpott Highway)	Formerly SR 107
Highland	0.83	1.34	SR 609 (Burnsville Road)	Unnamed road	SR 678 (Bullpasture Road)	
Isle of Wight	5.37	8.64	Suffolk City Limits	Buckhorn Drive Court Street	US 258 (Courthouse Highway)	
James City	4.81	7.74	Dead End	Brickyard Road Forge Road	US 60 (Richmond Road)	
King and Queen	16.77	26.99	SR 14 (The Trail)	Elsom Mascot Road Coldwater Road Piedmont Road Timber Branch Road Dragonville Road Hickory Hill Road Liberty Hall Road Spring Garden Road	SR 616 (Liberty Hall Road/Mount Zion Road)	Gap between segments ending at different points along SR 602
King George	7.52	12.10	SR 607 (Port Conway Road)	Powhatan Road Millbank Road Indiantown Road	SR 218 (Caledon Road)	Gap between segments ending at different points along SR 3
King William	8.80	14.16	SR 605 (Manfield Road)	Enfield Road Epworth Road Mitchells Mill Road	SR 609 (Smokey Road)	Gap between segments ending at different points along SR 30 Gap between segments ending at different points along SR 608
Lancaster	1.30	2.09	Dead End	Oakhill Road	SR 604 (Ottoman Ferry Road)	
Lee	2.90	4.67	Tennessee State Line	Unnamed road	SR 70	
Loudoun	0.40	0.64	Dead End	Ruritan Road	SR 859 (Ruritan Circle)	
Louisa	4.67	7.52	SR 663 (Owens Creek Road)	Holly Grove Drive	Hanover County Line	Gap between segments ending at different points along SR 635
Lunenburg	3.70	5.95	SR 138 (Hill Road)	Bacon Fork Road	SR 602 (Longview Drive)	
Madison	0.50	0.80	Dead End	Wilhoits Lane	SR 621 (Jacks Shop Road)	
Mathews	2.70	4.35	SR 614 (Ridgefield Road)	Marsh Hawk Road Old Garden Creek Road	SR 609 (Bethel Beach Road)	Gap between segments ending at different points along SR 611
Mecklenburg	2.90	4.67	Charlotte County Line	Bluestone Drive Rocky Branch Drive	SR 696 (Brankley Road)	Gap between segments ending at different points along SR 609
Middlesex	2.90	4.67	SR 602 (Old Virginia Street)	Burchs Mill Road	SR 640 (Waterview Road)	
Montgomery	3.20	5.15	SR 612 (High Rock Hill Road)	Huffville Road	Floyd County Line	
Nelson	1.98	3.19	Augusta County Line	Howardsville Turnpike	Blue Ridge Parkway	
New Kent	3.01	4.84	SR 106 (Emmaus Church Road)	Pine Fork Drive	SR 612 (Airport Road)	
Northampton	0.94	1.51	SR 618 (Bayside Road)	Short Street	SR 606 (Wardtown Road/Rogers Drive)	
Northumberland	3.60	5.79	Lancaster County Line	Light Street Sampsons Wharf Road	Dead End	
Nottoway	10.00	16.09	SR 614 (Cellar Creek Road)	Green Hill Road Cedar Hill Road Spainville Road Willis Road	Amelia County Line	Gap between segments ending at different points along SR 609 Gap between segments ending at different points along SR 153 Gap between segments ending at different points along SR 612
Orange	1.30	2.09	Greene County Line	Wilhoits Road	SR 609 (Scuffletown Road)	
Page	0.23	0.37	US 340	Rinaca Lane	Dead End	
Patrick	8.05	12.96	SR 673 (Strawberry Hill Road)	Busted Rock Road Cloudbreak Road Braswell Drive	SR 609 (Belcher Mountain Road)	Gap between segments ending at different points along US 58
Pittsylvania	0.60	0.97	Franklin County Line	Waters Edge Road	SR 626 (Smith Mountain Road)	
Powhatan	3.25	5.23	SR 604 (Genito Road)	Schroeder Road	SR 622 (Dorset Road)	
Prince Edward	1.60	2.57	SR 612 (Sandy River Road)	Moran Road	SR 606 (Piney Grove Road)	
Prince George	2.00	3.22	SR 10 (James River Drive)	Chippokes Roads	SR 611 (Brandon Road)	
Prince William	6.33	10.19	Dead End	Unnamed road Neabsco Road Cardinal Drive	SR 640 (Minnieville Road)/SR 2245 (Estate Drive)	Gap between dead ends
Pulaski	5.70	9.17	Wythe County Line	Case Knife Ridge Road	Pulaski Town Limits	
Rappahannock	1.82	2.93	Dead End	Chester Gap Road	US 522 (Zachary Taylor Highway)	
Richmond	2.15	3.46	SR 647 (Hales Point Road)	Laurel Grove Road Ivondale Road	SR 608 (Farnham Creek Road)	Gap between dead ends
Roanoke	1.81	2.91	Cul-de-Sac	Coachman Drive Ruritan Road	US 460 (Challenger Avenue)	
Rockbridge	13.17	21.20	Botetourt County Line	Plank Road	SR 764 (Possum Hollow)	
Rockingham	6.30	10.14	Shenandoah County Line	Runions Creek Road	SR 612 (Runions Creek Road)	
Russell	3.60	5.79	Scott County Line	Sabers Chapel Road Sunny Point Road	SR 65 (Mew Road)	
Scott	1.89	3.04	SR 774 (Long Hollow Road)	Unnamed road	Russell County Line	
Shenandoah	4.40	7.08	Rockingham County Line	Orkney Springs Road	SR 263 (Orkney Grade)	
Smyth	25.14	40.46	Saltville Town Limits	Old Quarry Road Valley Drive Old Rock Road	Bland County Line	Gap between segments ending at different points along SR 16 Gap between segments ending at different points along SR 622
Southampton	1.20	1.93	SR 612 (Rivers Mill Road/Fortsville Road)	Mason Road	Sussex County Line	
Spotsylvania	10.30	16.58	Culpeper County Line	Elys Ford Road Old Plank Road	SR 3 (Plank Road)	
Stafford	11.08	17.83	Fauquier County Line	Garrisonville Road Aquia Episcopal Church Road	US 1 (Jefferson Davis Highway)	Former SR 213
Surry	10.14	16.32	SR 646 (Spring Grove Avenue)	Swanns Point Road	Dead End	Gap between segments ending at different points along SR 618
Sussex	6.23	10.03	Southampton County Line	Harrell Road	SR 631 (Jarratt Road)	
Tazewell	4.44	7.15	SR 609 (Wardell Road)	Indian Point Road	US 19	
Warren	2.40	3.86	SR 55/SR 678	Bucks Mill Road	SR 626	
Washington	0.10	0.16	SR 645 (Wallace Pike)	Cathedral Hill Street	Dead End	
Westmoreland	7.35	11.83	SR 611 (Zion Church Road)	Rose Tucker Road Tucker Hill Road	Dead End	Gap between segments ending at different points along SR 606 Gap between segments ending at different points along SR 604
Wise	13.61	21.90	Big Stone Gap Town Limits	4th Avenue East Powell Valley Road Unnamed road Dorchester Road Unnamed road	Dead End	Gap between SR 1008 and US 23 Gap between segments ending at different points along SR 612 Gap between segments ending at different points along US 23 Gap between segments ending at different points along SR 790 Gap between segments ending at different points along SR 621 Gap between segments ending at different points along the Norton City Limits
Wythe	12.41	19.97	Wytheville Town Limits	Peppers Ferry Road	Pulaski County Line	
York	0.36	0.58	SR 618 (Hodges Cove Road)	Jernigan Lane	Dead End	
