= Virginia State Route 697 =

State highway in Virginia, United States

State Route 697

Route information
- Maintained by VDOT

Location
- Country: United States
- State: Virginia

Highway system
- Virginia Routes; Interstate; US; Primary; Secondary; Byways; History; HOT lanes

State Route 697 (SR 697) in the U.S. state of Virginia is a secondary route designation applied to multiple discontinuous road segments among the many counties. The list below describes the sections in each county that are designated SR 697.

== List ==
County	Length (mi)	Length (km)	From	Via	To	Notes
Accomack	0.50	0.80	SR 695 (Saxis Road)	Matthews Road	Dead End	
Albemarle	1.97	3.17	Dead End	Sutherland Road	US 29 (Monacan Trail)	
Alleghany	0.10	0.16	US 60 (Madison Street)	Carlyle Street	SR 667 (Wrightstown Avenue)	
Amelia	0.96	1.54	US 360 (Patrick Henry Highway)	Maplewood Road	SR 640 (Buckskin Creek Trail)	
Amherst	0.58	0.93	US 29 Bus	Spring Garden Road	Dead End	
Appomattox	0.53	0.85	SR 24 (Old Courthouse Road)	Mini Ball Lane	SR 24 (Old Courthouse Road)	
Augusta	3.30	5.31	SR 695 (Arborhill Road)	Griner Road McPheeters Road White Oak Gap Road Avenue of Trees	US 11 (Lee Jackson Highway)	Gap between segments ending at different points along SR 693 Gap between segments ending at different points along SR 613 Gap between segments ending at different points along US 11
Bath	0.15	0.24	SR 696 (Mountain Avenue)	Laurel Lane	SR 611 (College Lane)	
Bedford	1.90	3.06	US 460/US 221 (Lynchburg Salem Turnpike)	Camp Jaycee Road Emory Road	SR 617 (Pike Road)	Gap between dead ends
Botetourt	1.20	1.93	SR 696 (Buhrman Road)	Clydes Run Road	Dead End	
Brunswick	2.50	4.02	SR 46 (Christanna Highway)	Connell Road	SR 611 (Dry Bread Road)	
Buchanan	2.60	4.18	SR 643 (Hurley Road)	Cedar Branch Road/Knox Creek Road	Kentucky state line	
Buckingham	3.00	4.83	SR 636 (Tower Hill Road)	Austins Road	SR 646 (Union Church Road)	
Campbell	2.76	4.44	SR 701 (East Ferry Road)	Mitchell Mill Road	SR 699 (Gladys Road)	
Caroline	0.65	1.05	SR 601 (Cedar Fork Road)	Cedar Fork Road	Dead End	
Carroll	2.35	3.78	SR 148 (Chances Creek Road)	Reedside Drive	SR 685 (Winding Ridge Road)	
Charles City	0.26	0.42	Dead End	Countrywoods Drive	SR 106 (Roxbury Road)	
Charlotte	0.51	0.82	SR 47 (Thomas Jefferson Highway)	Dixon Road	SR 47 (Thomas Jefferson Highway)	
Chesterfield	3.40	5.47	SR 618 (Meadowville Road)	Bermuda Hundred Road	SR 827 (Allied Road)	
Craig	0.10	0.16	SR 617	Unnamed road	Dead End	
Culpeper	0.06	0.10	Dead End	Woodland Court	SR 764 (Mountain Run Lane)	
Cumberland	1.20	1.93	SR 45 (Cartersville Road)	Jenkins Ridge Road	Dead End	
Dickenson	0.80	1.29	Dead End	Unnamed road	SR 651	
Dinwiddie	0.40	0.64	SR 613 (White Oak Road)	Spicely Road	Dead End	
Essex	0.61	0.98	SR 617 (Island Farm Road/Richmond Beach Road)	Riverdale Road	Dead End	
Fairfax	2.12	3.41	SR 677 (Courthouse Road)	Woodford Road Electric Avenue Railroad Street	Dead End	Gap between a dead end and SR 1263
Fauquier	1.60	2.57	Dead End	Huntley Road	SR 628 (Blantyre Road)	
Floyd	1.10	1.77	Dead End	Deer Field Lane	SR 615 (Christiansburg Pike)	
Fluvanna	0.63	1.01	SR 6 (West River Road)	Cunningham Road	SR 640 (Cunningham Road/Shores Road)	
Franklin	7.91	12.73	SR 731 (Dugwell Road)	Brick Church Road Wirtz Road	SR 122 (Booker T Washington Highway)	Gap between segments ending at different points along US 220
Frederick	0.59	0.95	US 522 (Frederick Pike)	Morgan Road	West Virginia state line	
Giles	0.04	0.06	Dead End	Doe Car Road	SR 100 (Pulaski Giles Turnpike)	
Gloucester	0.43	0.69	Dead End	McFarland Lane	SR 616 (Belroi Road)	
Goochland	0.36	0.58	SR 667 (Old Columbia Road)	Marle Road	Dead End	
Grayson	4.59	7.39	US 21	Summerfield Road Beaver Dam Road	SR 700 (Old River Lane)	
Greensville	0.23	0.37	SR 683	Watkins Drive Unnamed road	Dead End	
Halifax	3.80	6.12	Dead End	Coleman Drive	SR 699 (Mount Caramel Road)	
Hanover	1.45	2.33	SR 657 (Greenwood Church Road)	Cherry Hill Road	SR 657 (Greenwood Church Road)	
Henry	7.68	12.36	Dead End	Moyer Lane Middle Creek Road Mitchell Road Barker Road Atkins Loop	SR 610 (Axton Road)	
Isle of Wight	1.39	2.24	SR 709 (Waterworks Road)	Mount Holly Creek Lane	Dead End	
James City	0.08	0.13	SR 666 (Cooley Road)	Gladys Drive	Cul-de-Sac	
King George	0.28	0.45	US 301 (James Madison Parkway)	Chestnut Hill Loop	US 301 (James Madison Parkway)	
Lancaster	0.35	0.56	SR 655 (Queenstown Road)	Smith Lane	Dead End	
Lee	0.22	0.35	US 58	Unnamed road	SR 672	
Loudoun	1.90	3.06	SR 690 (Mountain Road)	Legard Farm Road Nixon Road	SR 287 (Berlin Turnpike)	Gap between segments ending at different points along SR 611
Louisa	2.20	3.54	SR 640 (Old Mountain Road)	Vigor Road	SR 646 (Yanceyville Road)	
Lunenburg	1.60	2.57	SR 40 (Main Street)	Hickory Road	Dead End	
Madison	0.75	1.21	Dead End	Bootons Lane	SR 230 (Orange Road)/SR 685 (Burnt Tree Way)	
Mathews	0.45	0.72	SR 14 (John Clayton Memorial Highway)	Millers Lane	Dead End	
Mecklenburg	4.10	6.60	Dead End	Clay Road Parkside Road	SR 688 (Skipwith Road)	Gap between segments ending at different points along SR 49
Middlesex	0.17	0.27	US 17 Bus	Forrer Street	SR 698 (Legion Road)	
Montgomery	0.20	0.32	SR 603 (Cedar Run Road)	Sweeney Road	Dead End	
Nelson	0.40	0.64	SR 56 (Crabtree Falls Highway)	Fleetwood Hill Road	SR 680 (Pharsalia Road)	
Northampton	0.25	0.40	SR 637 (Pat Town Road)	Beverly Lane	Dead End	
Northumberland	0.25	0.40	SR 626 (Glebe Road)	Aaron Drive	Dead End	
Nottoway	0.35	0.56	Dead End	Dimmick Street	SR 624 (First Street Southeast)	
Orange	1.60	2.57	SR 627 (Clarks Mountain Road)	Moormont Road	Dead End	
Page	0.55	0.89	SR 662 (Compton Hollow Road)	Chrisman Drive	Dead End	
Patrick	4.55	7.32	SR 832 (Golf Course Road)	Midway Drive Via Orchard Road Dogwood Road	SR 694 (Dogwood Road)	Gap between segments ending at different points along SR 626
Pittsylvania	3.00	4.83	SR 698 (Henrys Mill Road)	Dabney House Road	SR 57 (Halifax Road)	
Prince Edward	0.63	1.01	Dead End	Cedar Crest Road	SR 621 (Twin Lakes Road)	
Prince George	0.11	0.18	Cul-de-Sac	Rosebud Court	SR 694 (Juniper Drive/Irwin Road)	
Prince William	0.10	0.16	SR 619 (Fuller Heights Road)	Weaver Road	Dead End	
Pulaski	1.77	2.85	Dead End	Towes Ferry Road	SR 611 (Newbern Road)	
Richmond	1.42	2.29	Barricade	Indianfield Road	SR 620 (Richmond Hill Road)	
Roanoke	1.58	2.54	SR 785 (Blacksburg Road)	Sandy Ridge Road	SR 624 (Newport Road)	
Rockbridge	0.90	1.45	Dead End	Amole Hollow Road	SR 699 (Wesley Chapel Road)	
Rockingham	0.40	0.64	SR 698 (Wise Hollow Road)	Hidden Valley Road	Dead End	
Russell	1.40	2.25	SR 613 (Moccasin Valley Road)	Wise Hollow Road	Dead End	
Scott	2.98	4.80	Dead End	Lark Spur Lane Fowlers Branch Road Unnamed road	US 58 (Bristol Highway)	
Shenandoah	0.87	1.40	SR 623 (Back Road)	Pontzer Road	Dead End	
Smyth	0.05	0.08	Dead End	Unnamed road	FR-8 (Paxton Lane)	
Southampton	1.30	2.09	SR 612 (Rivers Mill Road)	Hornet Swamp Road	Sussex County line	
Spotsylvania	0.50	0.80	Dead End	Red Hill Road	SR 613 (Brock Road)	
Stafford	0.35	0.56	Dead End	Derrick Lane	US 1 (Jefferson Davis Highway)	
Sussex	1.79	2.88	Southampton County line	Unnamed road	SR 609	
Tazewell	0.35	0.56	Dead End	Debra Road	SR 660 (Loop Road)	
Washington	1.84	2.96	SR 695 (Chip Ridge Road)	Branch Street	Abingdon town limits	
Westmoreland	0.99	1.59	Dead End	Lampkin Road	SR 625 (Horners Mill Road)	
Wise	0.41	0.66	Dead End	Unnamed road	SR 610 (Powell Valley Road)	
Wythe	0.55	0.89	FR 44 (Lee Highway)	Carters Park Lane	FR 44 (Lee Highway)	
York	0.09	0.14	SR 600 (Tide Mill Road)	Public Boat Dock Road	Dead End	
