= Virginia State Route 664 =

State highway in the United States of America

State Route 664

Route information
- Maintained by VDOT

Location
- Country: United States
- State: Virginia

Highway system
- Virginia Routes; Interstate; US; Primary; Secondary; Byways; History; HOT lanes

State Route 664 (SR 664) in the U.S. state of Virginia is a secondary route designation applied to multiple discontinuous road segments among the many counties. The list below describes the sections in each county that are designated SR 664.

== List ==
County	Length (mi)	Length (km)	From	Via	To	Notes
Accomack	1.30	2.09	US 13 (Lankford Highway)	Parks Road	Dead End	
Albemarle	8.13	13.08	SR 810 (Simmons Gap Road/Dyke Road)	Markwood Road Buck Mountain Road Buffalo River Road Frays Mountain Road	SR 743 (Advance Mills Road)	Gap between segments ending at different points along SR 663
Alleghany	0.70	1.13	Dead End	Frazier Hill Lane	Clifton Forge town limits	
Amelia	0.70	1.13	Dead End	Linden Lane	SR 708 (Namozine Road)	
Amherst	1.50	2.41	Dead End	Joshua Falls Road	SR 622 (Galts Mill Road)	
Appomattox	3.20	5.15	SR 26 (Oakville Road)	Cove Mountain Road	SR 605 (James River Road)	
Augusta	12.04	19.38	Nelson County line	Reeds Gap Road Mount Torrey Road Nursery Road Lyndhurst Road	Waynesboro city limits	
Bath	0.33	0.53	SR 42 (Cow Pasture River Road)	Sitlington Drive	Dead End	
Bedford	0.95	1.53	SR 646 (Bethany Church Circle)	Goshen Road	Dead End	
Bland	0.20	0.32	Dead End	Unnamed road	SR 608 (Wesendonick Road)	
Botetourt	0.94	1.51	SR 779 (Catawba Road)	Asbury Lane	SR 666 (Haymakertown Road)	
Brunswick	2.00	3.22	SR 626 (Gasburg Road)	Weaver Road	SR 663 (Huckstep Road)	
Buchanan	0.90	1.45	Dead End	Deel Fork Road	SR 609 (King Solomon Colley Road)	
Buckingham	4.20	6.76	SR 660 (Shelton Store Road)	Sycamore Creek Road	SR 604 (Woodland Church Road)	
Campbell	1.25	2.01	SR 677 (Old Rustburg Road/Camp Hydaway Road)	Old Rustburg Road	US 501 (Campbell Highway)	
Caroline	4.93	7.93	Dead End	Balty Road Bath Road	SR 638 (South River Road)	Gap between segments ending at different points along SR 639
Carroll	7.18	11.56	US 58 (Danville Pike)	Silverleaf Road	SR 638 (Dugspur Road)	
Charles City	0.45	0.72	SR 106 (Roxbury Road)	Roxbury Industrial Court	SR 106 (Roxbury Road)	
Charlotte	2.93	4.72	SR 666 (Vincent Store Road)	Butterwood Road	SR 615 (Rolling Hill Road)	
Chesterfield	4.40	7.08	SR 602 (River Road)	Coalboro Road	SR 655 (Beach Road)	
Clarke	0.30	0.48	Frederick County line	Neil Road	SR 645 (Wrights Mill Road)	
Craig	1.27	2.04	SR 611 (Peaceful Valley Road)	Wrights Branch Road	Dead End	
Culpeper	0.85	1.37	Dead End	Shiloh Church Road	SR 640 (Ryland Chapel Road)	
Cumberland	3.30	5.31	SR 600 (River Road)	Angola Road	SR 638 (Guinea Road)	
Dickenson	4.65	7.48	SR 670 (Lick Creek Road)	Turkey Branch Road Mill Street Clinchco Main Street Banner Street	Dead End	Gap between segments ending at different points along SR 652
Dinwiddie	1.20	1.93	Dead End	Reese Road	SR 609 (Old Stage Road)	
Essex	0.25	0.40	Dead End	Rappahannock Beach Drive	SR 670 (Broadhurst Road)	
Fairfax	2.89	4.65	SR 608 (West Ox Road)	Waples Mill Road Oakton Road	SR 655 (Jermantown Road)	Gap between segments ending at different points along SR 665
Fauquier	0.30	0.48	SR 602 (Rogues Road)	Grace Church Lane	Dead End	
Floyd	1.20	1.93	SR 639 (Booth Creek Road)	River Ridge Road	US 221 (Floyd Highway)	
Fluvanna	0.25	0.40	SR 627 (Zion Road)	Edd Ridge Lane	Dead End	
Franklin	0.75	1.21	Dead End	Hicks Hollow Road	SR 726 (Wades Gap Road)	
Frederick	3.34	5.38	US 11 (Martinsburg Pike)	Stephenson Road Jordan Springs Road	Clarke County line	
Giles	2.15	3.46	SR 665 (Wilbur Valley Road)	Green Hollow Road	SR 663 (Sugar Run Road)	
Gloucester	0.39	0.63	SR 616 (Belroi Road)	Oscar Road	Dead End	
Goochland	0.22	0.35	Dead End	Dogwood Drive	SR 662/SR 663	
Grayson	2.55	4.10	SR 662 (Falls Road)	Serenity Road	SR 611 (Stones Chapel Road)	
Greensville	0.25	0.40	Dead End	Walnut Drive	Emporia city limits	
Halifax	2.00	3.22	Pittsylvania County line	Johns Run Road	SR 675/SR 807	
Hanover	5.90	9.50	SR 610 (Taylors Creek Road)	Hopeful Church Road Gun Barrell Road	SR 631 (Old Ridge Road)	Gap between segments ending at different points along US 33
Henry	0.95	1.53	Dead End	Flatrock Drive	SR 657 (Dyers Store Road)	
King and Queen	0.95	1.53	SR 721 (Newtown Road)	Peach Grove Road	Dead End	
King George	1.00	1.61	Dead End	Bromme Circle	SR 694 (Lambs Creek Church Road)	
King William	1.52	2.45	SR 629 (Walkerton Road)	Woodbury Road	Dead End	
Lancaster	0.50	0.80	Dead End	Greentown Road	SR 709 (Gaskins Road)	
Lee	5.13	8.26	SR 855	McClures Chapel Road Boones Path Road Unnamed road	SR 946 (Burning Well Road)	
Loudoun	1.80	2.90	SR 663 (Taylorstown Road)	Wilt Store Road	US 15 (James Monroe Highway)	
Louisa	2.50	4.02	SR 610 (Holly Grove Drive)	Gammon Town Road	Dead End	
Lunenburg	3.50	5.63	SR 49 (Earl Davis Gregory Highway)	Modest Creek Road	SR 626 (Rubermont Road)	
Madison	0.30	0.48	SR 663 (Walkers Mill Lane)	Carter Ridge Lane	Dead End	
Mathews	0.90	1.45	SR 633 (Old Ferry Road)	Gatten Road	Dead End	
Mecklenburg	7.84	12.62	US 1	Union Level Road	SR 47	
Middlesex	0.32	0.51	Dead End	Woods Creek Road	SR 652 (Crittenden Road)	
Montgomery	2.65	4.26	Radford city limits	Lovely Mount Drive	SR 177 (Tyler Road)	
Nelson	6.01	9.67	Augusta County line	Beech Grove Road	SR 627 (Gullysville Lane/Glenthorne Loop)	
New Kent	0.10	0.16	Dead End	Jackson Street	SR 30/SR 33 (Eltham Road)	
Northampton	1.50	2.41	SR 628 (Wilsonia Neck Drive)	Jacobus Creek Road	Dead End	
Northumberland	0.45	0.72	SR 665 (Mila Road)	Wicomico View Lane	Dead End	
Nottoway	1.65	2.66	SR 49 (The Falls Road)	Dusty Road	SR 49 (The Falls Road)	
Orange	1.10	1.77	Albemarle County line	Buzzard Hollow Road	US 33 (Spotswood Trail)	
Page	1.30	2.09	Dead End	Unnamed road	Dead End	Gap between segments ending at different points along US 340
Patrick	1.10	1.77	North Carolina state line	Mills Road	SR 665 (Mills School Road)	
Pittsylvania	0.50	0.80	SR 698 (Henrys Mill Road)	Henrys Mill Lane	Halifax County line	
Powhatan	0.50	0.80	SR 711 (Robius Road)	Bourbon Lane	Dead End	
Prince Edward	6.62	10.65	Charlotte County line	Morris Creek Road Singleton Road	SR 658 (Five Forks Road)	
Prince George	0.26	0.42	SR 646 (Sandy Ridge Road)	Farmington Drive	Dead End	
Prince William	0.50	0.80	SR 612 (Yates Ford Road)	Bent Tree Lane	SR 689 (Signal Hill Road)	
Pulaski	1.26	2.03	SR 613 (Cherry Branch Road)	Graysontown Road	SR 605 (Little River Dam Road)	
Rappahannock	0.55	0.89	US 522 (Zachary Taylor Avenue)	Huntly Road	US 522 (Zachary Taylor Avenue)	
Richmond	0.45	0.72	SR 637 (Piney Grove Road)	Emmanuel Church Road	Dead End	
Roanoke	0.15	0.24	SR 666 (Bandy Road)	Sterling Road	SR 663 (Rakes Road)	
Rockbridge	0.76	1.22	Dead End	Unnamed road	SR 631 (Furrs Mill Road/Big Spring Drive)	
Rockingham	0.25	0.40	SR 803 (Daphna Road)	Sunrise Drive	Dead End	
Russell	2.32	3.73	SR 616 (Train Station Road)	Carbo Road	SR 600 (Ivy Ridge Road)	
Scott	6.29	10.12	SR 643	Unnamed road	SR 619	Gap between segments ending at different points along SR 665
Shenandoah	2.75	4.43	US 11 (Old Valley Pike)	Moose Road	Dead End	
Smyth	3.60	5.79	Dead End	Blake Road Farmview Road Church Hill Road Murray Road	SR 617	Gap between segments ending at different points along SR 659 Gap between segments ending at different points along SR 658 Gap between segments ending at different points along SR 645
Southampton	2.90	4.67	SR 663 (The Hall Road)	Waller Road	SR 659 (Vicks Mill Road)	
Spotsylvania	1.10	1.77	SR 601 (Lawyers Road)	Granite Springs Road	SR 680 (Granite Springs Road)	
Sussex	0.82	1.32	Dead End	Unnamed road	SR 620 (Brittle Mill Road)	
Tazewell	0.70	1.13	Dead End	Slade Hollow Road	US 19/US 460	
Warren	0.21	0.34	Dead End	Whipporwill Road	SR 55 (Strasburg Road)	
Washington	9.65	15.53	Dead End	Lake Road Aven Lane Whitaker Hollow Road	SR 674 (Denton Valley Road)	Gap between segments ending at different points along SR 670 Gap between SR 672 and a dead end
Westmoreland	4.10	6.60	SR 3 (Kings Highway)	Bristol Mine Road Ebb Tide Drive Harbour Circle	Loop	
Wise	3.80	6.12	Scott County line	Corder Town Road Unnamed road	SR 72	
Wythe	4.70	7.56	SR 666 (Hogback Road)	Glade Road	US 52 (Stoney Fork Road)	
