= Virginia State Route 762 =

Secondary route designation

State Route 762

Route information
- Maintained by VDOT

Location
- Country: United States
- State: Virginia

Highway system
- Virginia Routes; Interstate; US; Primary; Secondary; Byways; History; HOT lanes

State Route 762 (SR 762) in the U.S. state of Virginia is a secondary route designation applied to multiple discontinuous road segments among the many counties. The list below describes the sections in each county that are designated SR 762.

== List ==
County	Length (mi)	Length (km)	From	Via	To	Notes
Accomack	0.75	1.21	SR 679 (Metompkin Road)	Pettit Road	SR 730 (Pierce Taylor Road)	
Albemarle	0.80	1.29	SR 732 (Milton Road)	Rose Hill Church Lane	Dead End	
Amherst	0.10	0.16	Dead End	Stallings Road	SR 650 (Perch Road)	
Augusta	1.20	1.93	SR 731 (Emmanuel Church Road)	Grindstone Road	SR 727 (Grindstone Road/Wolf Ridge Road)	
Bedford	2.00	3.22	Dead End	Perennial Lane Goode Station Road	SR 643 (Bellevue Road)	Gap between segments ending at different points along SR 668
Botetourt	0.15	0.24	SR 761 (Leslie Lane)	Rosamae Drive	Dead End	
Campbell	0.58	0.93	Dead End	Tip Lane	SR 646 (Morris Church Road)	
Carroll	1.42	2.29	SR 638 (Hunters Ridge Road)	Waterview Drive	SR 753 (Double Cabin Road)	
Chesterfield	0.15	0.24	SR 619 (Happy Hill Road)	Sunset Avenue	Dead End	
Fairfax	0.16	0.26	SR 660 (Fairfax Station Road)	Tinkers Lane Vogue Road	SR 660 (Fairfax Station Road)	
Fauquier	1.50	2.41	SR 622 (Whiting Road)	Prince Road	SR 702 (Frogtown Road)	
Franklin	2.47	3.98	SR 607 (Fairfield Road)	Providence Church Road	SR 619 (Fanny Cook Road)	
Frederick	0.21	0.34	Dead End	Cole Lane	SR 7 (Berryville Pike)	
Halifax	0.60	0.97	SR 96 (Virgilina Road)	Zion Hill Church Loop	SR 96 (Virgilina Road)	
Hanover	0.12	0.19	SR 626 (Elmont Road)	Kenwood Church Road	Dead End	
Henry	0.50	0.80	Dead End	Whitehouse Road	US 220 (Greensboro Road)	
James City	0.14	0.23	SR 615 (Ironbound Road)	Magazine Road	SR 740 (Alesa Drive)	
Loudoun	1.50	2.41	Dead End	Lickey Mill Road	SR 690 (Silcott Springs Road)	
Louisa	0.35	0.56	Dead End	Christmas Road	SR 626 (Evergreen Road)	
Mecklenburg	3.27	5.26	SR 702 (Morgan Farm Road)	Townes Road	SR 677 (Wilkerson Road)	
Montgomery	0.26	0.42	SR 600 (Fire Tower Road)	Brookside Drive	Cul-de-Sac	
Pittsylvania	1.00	1.61	SR 760 (Music Street)	Simpson Lane	SR 940 (Owens Mill Road)	
Prince William	0.02	0.03	SR 761 (Windsor Road)	Oakmont Avenue	SR 790 (Oakmont Street)	
Pulaski	0.22	0.35	Dead End	Tabor Place	SR 710 (Mount Olivet Road)	
Roanoke	0.85	1.37	Dead End	Ivy Mountain Drive	SR 692 (Mount Chestnut Road)	
Rockbridge	0.19	0.31	SR 252 (Brownsburg Turnpike)	Academy Alley	SR 252 (Brownsburg Turnpike)	
Rockingham	1.60	2.57	SR 612 (Peake Mountain Road)	Eden Valley Road	SR 613 (Whitmore Shop Road)	
Scott	0.14	0.23	US 23	Starnes Street	Dead End	
Shenandoah	0.75	1.21	SR 629 (Oranda Road)	Old Factory Road	Dead End	
Spotsylvania	0.30	0.48	Dead End	White Shop Road	SR 719 (Days Bridge Road)	
Tazewell	0.19	0.31	Dead End	Angles Hollow Road	SR 655 (Joe Hunt Road)	
Washington	6.15	9.90	SR 91 (Monroe Road)	Loves Mill Road	Smyth County line	Formerly SR 79
Wise	0.44	0.71	Dead End	Unnamed road	US 58 Alt	
York	0.23	0.37	Dead End	York Point Drive	SR 712 (York Point Road)	
