= Virginia State Route 761 =

Secondary route designation

State Route 761

Route information
- Maintained by VDOT

Location
- Country: United States
- State: Virginia

Highway system
- Virginia Routes; Interstate; US; Primary; Secondary; Byways; History; HOT lanes

State Route 761 (SR 761) in the U.S. state of Virginia is a secondary route designation applied to multiple discontinuous road segments among the many counties. The list below describes the sections in each county that are designated SR 761.

== List ==
County	Length (mi)	Length (km)	From	Via	To	Notes
Accomack	0.37	0.60	Dead End	Acorn Drive	SR 654 (Acorn Drive)	
Albemarle	1.40	2.25	SR 622 (Albevanna Spring Road)	Briery Creek Road	Fluvanna County line	
Amherst	0.78	1.26	Dead End	Sprouse Drive Falconerville Road	SR 663 (Brightwells Mill Road)	
Augusta	1.70	2.74	SR 730 (North River Road)	Bluff Mountain Road Dorcas Road	SR 763 (Eubank Road/Old C & W Railway Road)	
Bedford	3.85	6.20	Dead End	Tamer Lane Holcomb Rock Road Albert Road	Dead End	
Botetourt	0.08	0.13	SR 713 (Richardson Drive)	Leslie Lane	SR 762 (Rosamae Drive)	
Campbell	7.99	12.86	Pittsylvania County line	Long Island Road	US 501/SR 652	Formerly SR 126
Carroll	2.40	3.86	SR 611 (Sunnyvale Road)	Lindsey Mill Road	SR 764 (Panther Creek Road)	
Chesterfield	0.33	0.53	SR 1175 (Truth Drive)	Attucks Drive Bass Street	SR 628 (Hickory Road)	
Fairfax	0.06	0.10	SR 760 (Brook Road)	Berry Place	Dead End	
Fauquier	1.00	1.61	SR 603 (Greenwich Road)	Greenville Road	SR 603 (Greenwich Road)	
Franklin	4.18	6.73	SR 605 (Henry Road)	Robin Road Canton Church Road	SR 607 (Fairfield Road)	
Frederick	3.18	5.12	US 11 (Martinsburg Pike)	Old Charles Town Road	Clarke County line	Formerly SR 274
Halifax	2.00	3.22	SR 621 (Beaver Pond Road)	Boxwood Road	US 501 (L P Bailey Memorial Highway)	
Hanover	0.50	0.80	SR 674 (Woodman Hall Road)	Parrish Farm Road	Dead End	
Henry	2.40	3.86	SR 687 (Stone Dairy Road)	Valley Drive	SR 609 (Dillons Fork Road)	
James City	0.26	0.42	US 60 (Richmond Road)	Norge Lane Unnamed road	Dead End	
Loudoun	2.07	3.33	SR 719 (Woodgrove Road)	Sunny Ridge Road	Dead End	
Louisa	0.24	0.39	US 33 (Jefferson Highway)	Hollyhurst Lane	Dead End	
Mecklenburg	1.50	2.41	US 1	Oak Road	Dead End	
Montgomery	0.27	0.43	SR 613 (Graysontown Road)	Old Pagelyn Road	Dead End	
Pittsylvania	8.70	14.00	SR 640 (Renan Road)	Straightstone Road	Campbell County line	Formerly SR 126
Prince William	0.32	0.51	SR 619 (Fuller Heights Road)	Windsor Road	Dead End	
Pulaski	0.06	0.10	Dead End	Cripple Creek Road	SR 693 (Julia Simpson Road)	
Roanoke	0.32	0.51	Cul-de-Sac	Huffman Lane	SR 658 (Rutrough Road)	
Rockbridge	0.12	0.19	Dead End	East Avenue	SR 56 (Tye River Turnpike)	
Rockingham	5.80	9.33	SR 752 (Muddy Creek Road)	Ralston Road Sky Road Rocky Lane	SR 721 (Green Hill Road)	
Scott	0.06	0.10	SR 837 (Bridge Street)	Dewey Avenue	SR 65	
Shenandoah	0.56	0.90	Strasburg town limits	Capon Road	SR 637 (Powhatan Road)	
Stafford	0.34	0.55	US 1 (Jefferson Davis Highway)	Potomac Creek Drive	Dead End	
Tazewell	0.25	0.40	SR 782 (Post Road)	Unnamed road	Dead End	
Washington	0.20	0.32	SR 608/SR 736	Irish Lane	Dead End	
Wise	0.31	0.50	US 58 Alt	Dan Hall Road	Dead End	
York	0.14	0.23	Dead End	Piney Point Road	SR 661 (Piney Point Road)	
