= Virginia State Route 702 =

Secondary route designation

State Route 702

Route information
- Maintained by VDOT

Location
- Country: United States
- State: Virginia

Highway system
- Virginia Routes; Interstate; US; Primary; Secondary; Byways; History; HOT lanes

State Route 702 (SR 702) in the U.S. state of Virginia is a secondary route designation applied to multiple discontinuous road segments among the many counties. The list below describes the sections in each county that are designated SR 702.

== List ==
County	Length (mi)	Length (km)	From	Via	To	Notes
Accomack	7.60	12.23	SR 701 (Jenkins Bridge Road)	Horsey Road Nocks Landing Road	Dead End	
Albemarle	2.40	3.86	Dead End	Reservoir Road	US 29 Bus	
Alleghany	0.49	0.79	SR 721	Big Cedar Drive	SR 718 (Edgehill Road)	
Augusta	0.70	1.13	SR 608 (Cold Springs Road)	Fauver Mine Lane	Dead End	
Bedford	1.00	1.61	SR 668 (Goode Road)	Prophet Road	Dead End	
Botetourt	2.70	4.35	SR 622 (Prices Bluff Road)	Hayden Loop	SR 622 (Prices Bluff Road)	
Campbell	0.40	0.64	Dead End	Younger Road	SR 648 (Suck Creek Road)	
Carroll	6.23	10.03	SR 775 (Chances Creek Road)	Stable Road	US 52 (Fancy Gap Highway)	
Chesterfield	0.65	1.05	SR 621 (Winterpock Road)	McEnnally Road Spring Run Road	US 360 (Hull Street Road)	
Dinwiddie	1.32	2.12	SR 638 (Harpers Road)	Lennie Road	SR 40 (Old Cryors Road)	
Fairfax	1.18	1.90	SR 675 (Beulah Road)	Beulah Road Forestville Drive	Cul-de-Sac	
Fauquier	6.45	10.38	SR 710 (Rectortown Road)	Frogtown Road Rock Hill Mill Road Rock Hill Road	SR 626 (Halfway Road)	Gap between segments ending at different points along SR 709
Franklin	3.24	5.21	SR 671 (Golden View Road)	Farm View Road	SR 871 (Longwood Road)	
Frederick	0.80	1.29	West Virginia state line	Ridgeview Road	SR 703 (Whitacre Road)	
Halifax	3.70	5.95	Pittsylvania County line	Logan Road	SR 666 (East Elkhorn Road)	
Hanover	1.35	2.17	SR 627 (Meadowbridge Road)	Ellerson Drive Windsor Drive	SR 638 (Atlee Road)	
Henry	2.06	3.32	Dead End	Beckham Church Road	SR 650 (Irisburg Road)	
James City	0.17	0.27	Dead End	Willow Drive	SR 617 (Lake Powell Road)	
Loudoun	0.50	0.80	SR 690 (Hillsboro Road)	Koerner Lane	Dead End	
Louisa	0.50	0.80	Dead End	Dell Perkins Road	SR 637 (Brickhouse Road)	
Mecklenburg	2.43	3.91	US 58	Morgan Farm Road	SR 701 (Wilbourne Road)	
Pittsylvania	2.20	3.54	SR 640 (Riceville Road)	McDaniel Road	Halifax County line	
Prince William	0.49	0.79	Dead End	Grant Avenue	Manassas city limits	
Pulaski	0.47	0.76	SR 715 (Madison Street)	Spring Avenue Pulaski Avenue	SR 114 (Peppers Ferry Boulevard)	
Roanoke	1.14	1.83	Dead End	Castle Rock Road	SR 1662 (McVitty Road)	
Rockbridge	0.12	0.19	US 60 (Midland Trail)	Quarry Lane	Dead End	
Rockingham	0.63	1.01	SR 701 (Silver Lake Road)	Old Thirty Three Road	SR 1135 (Belmont Drive)	
Scott	3.05	4.91	SR 614 (Nottingham Road)	Unnamed road Sherwood Forest Lane Ketron Town Lane Unnamed road	Tennessee state line	Gap between dead ends Gap between segments ending at different points along SR 704
Shenandoah	1.84	2.96	SR 717 (Alum Springs Road)	Miller Road	SR 701 (Dellinger Gap Road)	
Spotsylvania	0.90	1.45	SR 606 (Post Oak Road)	Curtis Lane	Dead End	
Stafford	0.80	1.29	Dead End	Wyche Road	SR 630 (Courthouse Road)	
Tazewell	2.20	3.54	SR 643 (Mud Fork Road)	Pauley Street	SR 644 (Bossevain Road/Abbs Valley Road)	
Washington	0.15	0.24	Abingdon town limits	Baugh Lane	SR 699 (Walden Road)	
Wise	0.21	0.34	SR 609/SR 842	Unnamed road	SR 613 (East Stone Gap Road)	
York	0.43	0.69	SR 620 (Railway Road)	Jethro Lane	Dead End	
