= Virginia State Route 662 =

State highway in Virginia, United States

State Route 662

Route information
- Maintained by VDOT

Location
- Country: United States
- State: Virginia

Highway system
- Virginia Routes; Interstate; US; Primary; Secondary; Byways; History; HOT lanes

State Route 662 (SR 662) in the U.S. state of Virginia is a secondary route designation applied to multiple discontinuous road segments among the many counties. The list below describes the sections in each county that are designated SR 662.

== List ==
County	Length (mi)	Length (km)	From	Via	To	Notes
Accomack	3.45	5.55	Dead End	Bayles Neck Road	Dead End	
Albemarle	2.35	3.78	SR 660 (Reas Ford Road)	Bleak House Road	SR 665 (Buck Mountain Road)	
Alleghany	1.17	1.88	Clifton Forge town limits	Unnamed road	US 60 Bus/SR 1404	
Amelia	1.00	1.61	SR 38 (Five Forks Road)	Pine Lane	Dead End	
Amherst	3.20	5.15	SR 151 (Patrick Henry Highway)	Geddes Mountain Road	US 29 (Amherst Highway)	
Appomattox	0.17	0.27	SR 631 (Oakleigh Avenue)	Rose Lane	Dead End	
Augusta	5.87	9.45	SR 693 (Berry Moore Road)	Stover School Road Greenville School Road	SR 608 (Cold Springs Road)	Gap between segments ending at different points along SR 1205
Bath	0.22	0.35	SR 39 (Mountain Valley Road)	Edgewood Lane	Dead End	
Bedford	3.20	5.15	Dead End	Mays Mill Road Hooper Road	SR 621 (Cottontown Road)	Gap between segments ending at different points along SR 663
Bland	0.30	0.48	SR 606 (Wilderness Road)	Hungry Hollow Drive	Dead End	
Botetourt	0.31	0.50	US 220 (Botetourt Road)	Full House Road	US 220 (Botetourt Road)	
Brunswick	6.90	11.10	SR 626 (Robinson Ferry Road)	Tillman Road	SR 659 (Brodnax Road)	
Buchanan	3.20	5.15	Dead End	Unnamed road Robinson Fork Road	SR 624 (Garden Creek Road)	Gap between segments ending at different points along SR 620
Buckingham	4.81	7.74	SR 607 (Greenway Road)	Midland Road	SR 56 (James River Highway)	
Campbell	2.08	3.35	SR 660 (Oxford Furnace Road)	Oxford Furnace Road	US 460 (Lynchburg Highway)	
Caroline	2.10	3.38	SR 602 (Concord Road)	Gregory Road	SR 653 (Burruss Road)	
Carroll	4.67	7.52	SR 664 (Silverleaf Road)	Poplar Hill Drive	US 221 (Floyd Pike)	
Charles City	0.05	0.08	SR 612 (Ruthville Road)	Community Center Road	Dead End	
Charlotte	0.50	0.80	SR 47 (Thomas Jefferson Highway)	Tower Loop Road	SR 691 (Tower Road)	
Chesterfield	1.50	2.41	SR 702 (McEnnally Road)	Spring Run Road	SR 654 (Spring Run Road)	
Clarke	0.07	0.11	Dead End	Tannery Lane	SR 255 (Bishop Meade Road)	
Craig	1.87	3.01	SR 42 (Cumberland Gap Road)	Unnamed road	SR 658 (Johns Creek Mountain Road/Happy Hollow Road)	
Culpeper	2.20	3.54	SR 658 (Mount Pony Road)	Kibler Road	SR 661 (Blackjack Road)	
Cumberland	1.20	1.93	Dead End	Strawberry Hill Road	SR 13 (Old Buckingham Road)	
Dickenson	1.65	2.66	Dead End	Sutherland Ridge Road	SR 652 (Dyers Chapel Road)	
Dinwiddie	1.20	1.93	SR 617 (Bolster Road)	Hardwood Creek Road	SR 619 (Courthouse Road)	
Essex	2.95	4.75	US 17 (Tidewater Trail)	Harris Hill Road	SR 611 (Wares Wharf Road)	
Fairfax	3.50	5.63	Dead End	Stone Road Poplar Tree Road Westfields Boulevard	SR 657 (Walney Road)	
Fauquier	1.39	2.24	SR 661 (Oak Shade Road)	Weaverville Road	SR 663 (Covingtons Corner Road)	
Floyd	0.90	1.45	Dead End	Vest Tannery Road	SR 661 (Kings Store Road)	
Fluvanna	1.70	2.74	SR 645 (Beals Lane)	Dobby Creek Road	SR 611 (Paynes Landing Road)	
Franklin	5.28	8.50	SR 673 (Jacks Mountain Road)	Jacks Creek Road Edwardsway Road Old Salem School Road	Dead End	Gap between segments ending at different points along SR 40
Frederick	1.70	2.74	SR 661 (Redbud Road)	Milburn Road	SR 761 (Old Charles Town Road)	
Giles	1.40	2.25	SR 661 (Midkiff Road)	Arch Epton Road	SR 663 (Sugar Run Road)	
Gloucester	1.40	2.25	SR 618 (Cappahosic Road)	Allmondsville Road	SR 606 (Ark Road)	
Goochland	0.98	1.58	SR 6 (River Road)	Willway Drive	Cul-de-Sac	
Grayson	6.63	10.67	Dead End	Logans Lane Falls Road Little Road Falls Road Unnamed road	SR 663 (Caty Sage Road)	Gap between segments ending at different points along SR 611
Greene	0.70	1.13	SR 654	Unnamed road	SR 654 (Mays Road)	
Greensville	1.50	2.41	US 301 (Skippers Road)	Unnamed road	North Carolina state line	
Halifax	8.40	13.52	SR 360 (Mountain Road)	Birch Elmo Road Ashton Hall Road	SR 658 (Melon Road)	Gap between segments ending at different points along SR 659
Hanover	0.70	1.13	SR 54 (Patrick Henry Road)	Providence Church Road	Dead End	
Henry	2.14	3.44	Martinsville city limits	Clearview Drive	Old SR 57	
Isle of Wight	3.51	5.65	US 258/SR 32 (Brewers Neck Boulevard)	Deep Bottom Drive Channell Way Whippingham Parkway	US 17/US 258/SR 32 (Carrollton Boulevard)	
James City	0.21	0.34	SR 661 (Jackson Drive)	Stuart Circle Lee Drive	SR 143 (Merrimac Trail)	
King and Queen	0.46	0.74	Dead End	Greenbriar Road	SR 634 (Canterbury Road)	
King George	0.60	0.97	SR 706 (Pullen Loop)	Oaktree Drive	Dead End	
King William	1.35	2.17	US 360 (Richmond Tappahannock Highway)	Sharon Road	US 360 (Richmond Tappahannock Highway)	
Lancaster	2.11	3.40	Dead End	Thomas Landing Road Sage Hill Road	Dead End	Gap between segments ending at different points along SR 354
Lee	7.39	11.89	SR 661 (Flatwoods Road)	Tobacco Road Curt Russell Road	US 58	
Loudoun	19.99	32.17	SR 797 (Mount Gilead Road)	Loudoun Orchard Road Canby Road Simpson Circle Clarks Gap Road Factory Street Second Street Main Street Clover Hill Road Stumptown Road Lucketts Road Lost Corner Road	SR 657 (Spinks Ferry Road)	Gap between SR 7 Bus and SR 9 Gap between segments ending at different points along SR 9 Gap between segments ending at different points along SR 665
Louisa	0.12	0.19	Dead End	Thomasson Road	SR 208 (Courthouse Road)	
Lunenburg	11.09	17.85	Dead End	Washington Avenue Nutbush Road	Prince Edward County line	
Madison	14.18	22.82	Dead End	Shiffletts Corner Lane Shelby Road Graves Mill Road Graves Road	Dead End	Gap between segments ending at different points along SR 231 Gap between segments ending at different points along SR 230
Mathews	0.40	0.64	Dead End	Mathews Lane	SR 626 (Hallieford Road)	
Mecklenburg	7.96	12.81	SR 47	Wightman Road	SR 47	
Middlesex	0.40	0.64	SR 33 (General Puller Highway)/SR 688	Pocahontas Avenue	Dead End	
Montgomery	1.20	1.93	Christiansburg town limits	Silver Lake Road	SR 661 (Chrisman Mill Road/Silver Lake Road)	Gap between segments ending at different points along US 11
Nelson	4.63	7.45	SR 739 (Tye River Road)	Powells Island Road	SR 655 (Variety Mills Road)	Gap between segments ending at different points along SR 661
New Kent	0.60	0.97	Dead End	Golden Wheel Road	SR 106 (Emmaus Church Road)	
Northampton	0.82	1.32	SR 600 (Seaside Road)	Indian Village Road	Dead End	
Northumberland	0.50	0.80	SR 646 (Fairport Road)	Timbs Road	Dead End	
Nottoway	0.80	1.29	Dead End	Mill Road	SR 46 (Brunswick Road)	
Orange	0.30	0.48	Dead End	Oakshade Road	SR 612 (Monrovia Road)	
Page	5.37	8.64	US 340 (Stonewall Jackson Memorial Highway)	Rileyville Road Compton Hollow Road	US 340 (Stonewall Jackson Memorial Highway)	
Patrick	3.51	5.65	North Carolina state line	Collinstown Road Willard Creek Lane	Dead End	Gap between segments ending at different points along SR 103
Pittsylvania	9.66	15.55	SR 640 (Spring Garden Road)	Dodson Road Bair Branch Road Randolph Drive	SR 360 (Old Richmond Road)	Gap between segments ending at different points along SR 701 Gap between segments ending at different points along SR 729
Powhatan	0.54	0.87	Dead End	Deer Lane	SR 627 (Ridge Road)	
Prince Edward	2.08	3.35	SR 630 (Free State Road)	Levi Road	US 360 (Patrick Henry Highway)	
Prince George	3.35	5.39	SR 638 (Templeton Road)	Hair Road	SR 627 (Loving Union Road)	
Prince William	2.69	4.33	Dead End	Moore Drive	SR 689 (Signal Hill Road)	
Pulaski	2.61	4.20	SR 611 (Newbern Road)	Lyons Road	Dead End	
Rappahannock	2.70	4.35	Dead End	Hillsboro Road Little Long Mountain Road	Dead End	Gap between segments ending at different points along US 522
Richmond	0.70	1.13	SR 661 (Totuskey Church Road)	Withers Lane	SR 619 (Rich Neck Road)	
Roanoke	0.30	0.48	SR 658 (Rutrough Road)	Sha-al Road	Dead End	
Rockbridge	2.20	3.54	SR 661	Springbrangh Road	SR 612 (Blue Grass Trail)	
Russell	3.40	5.47	SR 82 (Cleveland Road)	Spring City Road	SR 740 (Copper Road)	
Scott	4.44	7.15	SR 664	Unnamed road	SR 65 (Clinch River Highway)	
Shenandoah	0.80	1.29	SR 642 (Swartz Road)	Jess Sine Road	US 11 (Old Valley Pike)	
Smyth	1.30	2.09	SR 660 (Adwolf Road)	Laurel Springs Road	SR 707 (Laurel Springs Road)	
Southampton	7.00	11.27	SR 653 (Little Texas Road)	Ivy Tact Road	SR 615 (Hicksford Road)	
Spotsylvania	1.92	3.09	SR 669 (Butler Road)	Log Cabin Road	SR 658 (Mount Olive Road)	
Stafford	2.90	4.67	SR 612 (Hartwood Road)	Stony Hill Road	SR 616 (Poplar Road)	
Surry	0.65	1.05	Dead End	Melville Drive	SR 634 (Alliance Road)	
Sussex	2.97	4.78	SR 640 (Briggs Road)	Hunting Quarter Church Road	SR 641	
Tazewell	5.00	8.05	SR 61 (Clearfork Road)	Cove Creek Road	Bluefield town limits	
Warren	0.33	0.53	Frederick County line	Foster Hollow Road	Dead End	
Washington	1.32	2.12	SR 645 (Wyndale Road)	Spring Valley Road	SR 645 (Wyndale Road)	
Westmoreland	0.50	0.80	SR 202 (Cople Highway)	McGuires Wharf Road	Dead End	
Wise	0.66	1.06	Dead End	Unnamed road	SR 699	
Wythe	0.40	0.64	Dead End	Walters Road	SR 664 (Glade Road)	
York	0.12	0.19	SR 643 (Caran Road)	Arden Drive	Dead End	
