= VA97 =

VA-97 has the following meanings:

- Attack Squadron 97 (U.S. Navy)
- State Route 97 (Virginia)
