= Virginia State Route 285 =

State highway in Augusta County, Virginia, US

State Route 285
- Tinkling Spring Road

Route information
- Maintained by VDOT
- Length: 1.85 mi (2.98 km)
- Existed: late 1990s–present

Major junctions
- South end: SR 608 / SR 631 / SR 935 near Fishersville
- I-64 near Fishersville
- North end: US 250 / SR 608 / SR 805 in Fishersville

Location
- Country: United States
- State: Virginia
- Counties: Augusta

Highway system
- Virginia Routes; Interstate; US; Primary; Secondary; Byways; History; HOT lanes
← SR 283	→ SR 286

State Route 285 (SR 285) is a primary state highway in the U.S. state of Virginia. Known as Tinkling Spring Road, the state highway runs 1.85 miles (2.98 km) from SR 608 and SR 935 near Fishersville north to U.S. Route 250 (US 250) in Fishersville in eastern Augusta County.

== Route description ==
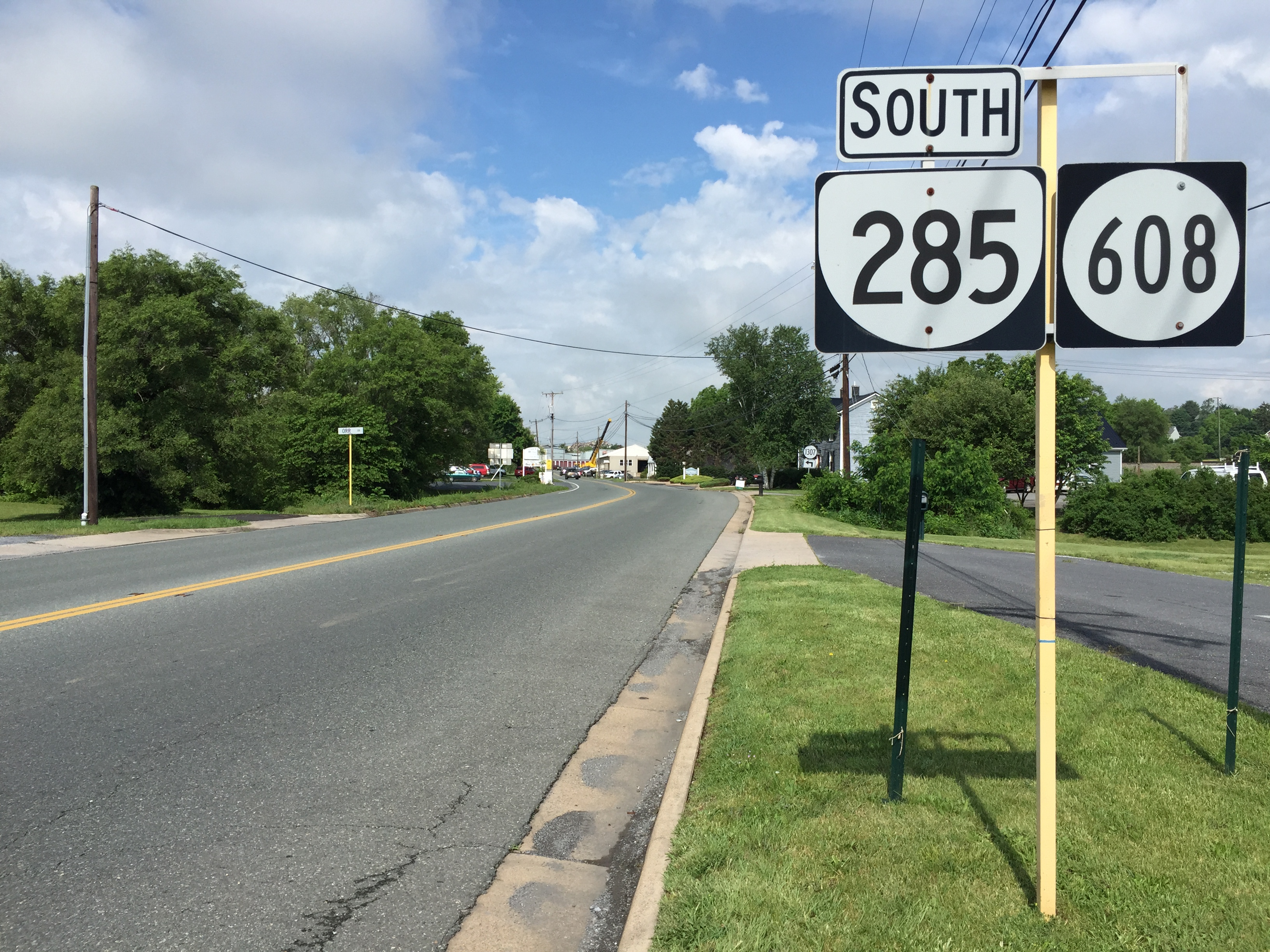
View south along SR 285 and SR 608 in Fishersville

SR 285 begins at its intersection with SR 608 and SR 935 (Expo Road) southwest of Fishersville. Tinkling Spring Road continues south as SR 608 toward Stuarts Draft. SR 285 heads northeast as a two-lane undivided road through a diamond interchange with Interstate 64 and passes the Augusta Health medical center. The state highway veers east and briefly parallels CSX's North Mountain Subdivision before reaching its northern terminus at US 250 (Jefferson Highway) just south of its crossing of the railroad in the village of Fishersville.

== Major intersections ==
The entire route is in Augusta County.

Location	mi	km	Destinations	Notes
	0.00	0.00	SR 608 south (Tinkling Spring Road) / SR 631 (Ladd Road) / SR 935 (Expo Road) – Stuarts Draft, Expoland	south end of SR 608 overlap
	0.21	0.34	I-64 – Staunton, Richmond	Exit 91 (I-64)
Fishersville			SR 636 / SR 640 (Goose Creek Road)	former SR 273 south
Fishersville	1.85	2.98	US 250 / SR 608 (Jefferson Highway) / SR 805 (Station House Road) – Staunton, Waynesboro, Woodrow Wilson Rehabilitation Center, Waynesboro Eagles Nest Airport	north end of SR 608 overlap
1.000 mi = 1.609 km; 1.000 km = 0.621 mi
