= Virginia State Route 658 =

State highway in Virginia, United States

State Route 658

Route information
- Maintained by VDOT

Location
- Country: United States
- State: Virginia

Highway system
- Virginia Routes; Interstate; US; Primary; Secondary; Byways; History; HOT lanes

State Route 658 (SR 658) in the U.S. state of Virginia is a secondary route designation applied to multiple discontinuous road segments among the many counties. The list below describes the sections in each county that are designated SR 658.

== List ==
County	Length (mi)	Length (km)	From	Via	To	Notes
Accomack	15.25	24.54	SR 718 (Hill Street)	Liberty Street College Avenue North Street Town Road Bayside Road Big Road Winterville Road Guards Shore Road Winterville Road	SR 690 (Whites Crossing Road)	Gap between segments ending at different points along SR 179 Gap between segments ending at different points along SR 657 Gap between segments ending at different points along SR 669 Two gaps between segments ending at different points along SR 684
Albemarle	1.00	1.61	SR 601 (Garth Road)	Barracks Farm Road	Dead End	
Alleghany	1.90	3.06	Dead End	Jingling Rocks Road	SR 600	
Amelia	2.40	3.86	SR 645 (Soap Stone Road)	Drunkard Road	SR 671 (Jetersville Road)	
Amherst	3.91	6.29	SR 739 (Boxwood Farm Road)	Grandmas Hill Road	Nelson County line	
Appomattox	0.60	0.97	SR 677 (Log Cabin Road)	Eldon Road	Dead End	
Augusta	1.45	2.33	SR 657 (Indian Ridge Road)	Avis Road	SR 608 (Cold Springs Road)	
Bath	0.18	0.29	Dead End	Park Lane	US 220 (Ingalls Boulevard)	
Bedford	2.57	4.14	Dead End	Walnut Hollow Road	Lynchburg city limits	
Bland	1.21	1.95	Dead End	Old Mill Road	SR 656 (Raleigh Grayson Turnpike)	
Botetourt	3.67	5.91	Dead End	Davis Road Willowbrook Lane Welches Run Road Laymantown Road	Dead End	Gap between segments ending at different points along SR 738 Gap between segments ending at different points along US 221/US 460
Brunswick	3.80	6.12	SR 659 (Brodmax Road)	Hill Creek Road	SR 644 (Robinson Ferry Road)	
Buchanan	4.00	6.44	SR 605 (Russell Fork Road)	Little Paw Paw Road	SR 83	
Buckingham	6.21	9.99	SR 649 (Slate River Mill Road)	Saint Andrews Road Pattetson Road	SR 655 (Jerusalem Church Road)	Gap between segments ending at different points along SR 602
Campbell	2.50	4.02	SR 656 (Plum Branch Road)	Toll Gate Road	SR 646 (Spring Mill Road)	
Caroline	8.43	13.57	SR 639 (Ladysmith Road)	Jericho Road	US 1 (Jefferson Davis Highway)/SR 207 (Rogers Clark Boulevard)	
Carroll	0.75	1.21	Dead End	Trestle Road	SR 94 (Ivanhoe Road)	
Charles City	3.10	4.99	SR 5 (John Tyler Memorial Highway)	Kimages Road	SR 607 (Wayside Road)	
Charlotte	4.41	7.10	SR 709 (Union Cemetery Road)	Welsh Tract Road	SR 655 (Bethlehem Road)	
Chesterfield	0.50	0.80	SR 602 (River Road)	Walkes Quarter Road	SR 659 (Riverway Road)	
Clarke	3.64	5.86	Warren County line	Sugar Hill Road White Post Road	US 340	
Craig	14.98	24.11	SR 42 (Cumberland Gap Road)	Happy Hollow Road Johns Creek Mountain Road Dicks Creek Road Johns Creek Road	SR 311 (Paint Bank Road)	
Culpeper	4.62	7.44	US 522	Mount Pony Road	SR 661 (Blackjack Road)	
Cumberland	0.10	0.16	SR 657 (Jamestown Road)	Ingles Road	Dead End	
Dickenson	2.20	3.54	SR 657	Unnamed road	Dead End	
Dinwiddie	4.31	6.94	SR 709 (Shipping Road)	Branches Road	SR 619 (Courthouse Road)	
Essex	1.00	1.61	SR 637 (Occupacia Road)	Popoman Swamp Road	Dead End	
Fairfax	6.71	10.80	SR 621 (Bull Run P.O. Road)	Compton Road	SR 645 (Clifton Road)	
Fauquier	3.60	5.79	SR 651 (Freemans Ford Road)	Cemetery Road	SR 660 (Saint Pauls Road)	
Floyd	0.24	0.39	SR 1011 (Harris Hart Road)	Scales Road	SR 694 (Newtown Road)	
Fluvanna	0.12	0.19	Dead End	Lowfields Lane	SR 640 (Shores Road)	
Franklin	2.70	4.35	Dead End	Listening Hill Road	SR 946 (Novelty Road)	
Frederick	0.30	0.48	Dead End	Brookland Lane	SR 659 (Valley Mill Road)	
Giles	1.15	1.85	Dead End	Camp Meeting Road	SR 622 (Broad Hollow Road)	
Gloucester	0.20	0.32	SR 643 (Cuba Road)	Steer Point Road	Dead End	
Goochland	0.50	0.80	Dead End	Pace Road	SR 606 (Hadensville-Fife Road)	
Grayson	22.18	35.70	SR 16 (Troutdale Highway)	Flatridge Road Comers Rock Road	US 21 (Elk Creek Parkway)	
Greene	0.44	0.71	SR 629 (Welsh Run Road)	Parrotts Road	SR 629 (Welsh Run Road)	
Greensville	1.10	1.77	Dead End	Campground Road	SR 611 (Dry Bread Road)	
Halifax	27.01	43.47	Pittsylvania County line	Melon Road Turbeville Road Cluster Springs Road Cherry Hill Church Road Maple Grove Road Virgie Cole Road	US 58/SR 601	Gap between segments ending at different points along SR 744 Gap between segments ending at different points along SR 741
Hanover	15.16	24.40	SR 54 (West Patrick Henry Road)	Goshen Road Tyler Station Road Green Bay Road	Spotsylvania County line	
Henry	2.72	4.38	SR 663 (Barrows Mill Road)	Fox Fire Road	SR 657 (Dyers Store Road)	
Isle of Wight	0.16	0.26	SR 616 (Airport Drive)	Johnson Circle	Cul-de-Sac	
James City	1.36	2.19	SR 612 (Longhill Road)/SR 1517 (Devon Road)	Olde Towne Road	US 60 (Richmond Road)	
King and Queen	3.14	5.05	SR 605 (York River Road)	Travellers Road	SR 601 (Stratton Major Road)	
King George	0.53	0.85	SR 600 (Passapatanzy Drive)	Cedar Ridge Lane	Dead End	
King William	0.55	0.89	SR 30 (King William Road)	Indian Church Road	Dead End	
Lancaster	0.07	0.11	SR 647 (Poplar Neck Road)	Unnamed road	SR 648 (Poplar Neck Road)	
Lee	3.65	5.87	SR 664 (Boones Path Road)	Cedar Hill Road	US 58 (Daniel Boone Heritage Highway)	Gap between segments ending at different points along SR 660
Loudoun	3.40	5.47	SR 657 (Spinks Ferry Road)	Evans Pond Road Saint Clair Lane	US 15 (James Monroe Highway)	Gap between segments ending at different points along SR 662
Louisa	4.40	7.08	SR 601 (Paynes Mill Road)	Jackson Road Old Apple Grove Road	SR 657 (Apple Grove Road)	Gap between segments ending at different points along SR 648
Lunenburg	1.60	2.57	SR 712 (Wallaces Bridge Road)	Wattsboro Circle Road	SR 671 (Reedy Creek Road)	
Madison	3.80	6.12	SR 657 (Thrift Road)	Ruth Road	SR 656 (Courtney Hollow Lane)	
Mathews	1.21	1.95	Dead End	Kingston Lane	SR 14 (John Clayton Memorial Highway)	
Mecklenburg	4.70	7.56	SR 670 (Hutcheson Road)	Wheatland Road Northside Road	SR 660 (Old Cox Road)	Gap between segments ending at different points along SR 47
Middlesex	0.55	0.89	SR 695 (Mount Zion Road)	Country Road	Dead End	
Montgomery	3.57	5.75	SR 177/SR 600 (Tyler Road)	Meadow Creek Road	SR 8 (Riner Road)	Formerly SR 110
Nelson	1.20	1.93	Amherst County line	Grandmas Hill Road	SR 657 (Tye River Road)	
New Kent	0.50	0.80	Dead End	Higgins Road	SR 611 (South Quaker Road)	
Northampton	0.35	0.56	Dead End	Walnut Grove Lane	SR 683 (Capeville Drive)	
Northumberland	1.40	2.25	Dead End	Chesapeake Beach Road Seaboard Road	Dead End	Gap between segments ending at different points along SR 657
Nottoway	1.20	1.93	US 460 Bus	Battleview Road	SR 626 (Hungarytown Road)	
Orange	1.45	2.33	Dead End	Hamm Road	US 33 (Spotswood Trail)	
Page	6.90	11.10	SR 648 (Sandy Hook Road)	Unnamed road	Shenandoah National Park boundary	Gap between segments ending at different points along SR 611
Patrick	0.65	1.05	Dead End	Bullins Lane	SR 660 (Five Forks Road)	
Pittsylvania	1.80	2.90	Halifax County line	Dr Milams Road	SR 659 (Laurel Grove Road)	
Powhatan	0.90	1.45	Dead End	May Way Drive	SR 678 (Rocky Oak Road)	
Prince Edward	13.73	22.10	Dead End	Mountainview Road Five Forks Road	SR 692 (College Road)	
Prince George	1.29	2.08	SR 611 (Lebanon Road)	Lone Oak Mill Road	SR 616 (Laurel Springs Road/Pole Run Road)	
Prince William	2.50	4.02	SR 604 (Burwell Road)	Owls Nest Road	SR 215 (Vint Hill Road)	
Pulaski	4.63	7.45	SR 609 (Boyd Road)	Delton Road Old Baltimore Road	FR-47 (Kirby Road)	
Rappahannock	1.53	2.46	SR 618 (Besse Bell Mountain Road)	Red Oak Mountain Road	Dead End	
Richmond	0.52	0.84	Dead End	Murphys Place	SR 619 (Mulberry Road)	
Roanoke	2.18	3.51	Roanoke city limits	Rutrough Road	SR 618 (Highland Road)	
Rockbridge	0.70	1.13	SR 770 (Turnpike Road)	Smith Hollow Road	Dead End	
Rockingham	0.70	1.13	SR 672 (Pineville Road)	Valley View Road	SR 657 (Longley Road)	
Russell	1.82	2.93	SR 657 (Green Valley Road)	Big Cedar Creek Road	Lebanon town limits	
Scott	0.30	0.48	Dead End	Unnamed road	SR 659 (River Bluff Road)	
Shenandoah	1.40	2.25	Dead End	Mauser Lane	SR 652 (Jadwyn Road)	Gap between segments ending at different points along SR 623
Smyth	8.99	14.47	SR 650 (South Fork Road)	Tilleys Bridge Road Scratch Gravel Road Chilhowie Road Smyth Valley Road Spring Valley Road Church Hill Road	SR 645 (Fox Valley Road)	Gap between segments ending at different points along the Marion town limits
Southampton	17.54	28.23	SR 659 (Pinopolis Road)	Cedar View Road	SR 673 (Grays Shop Road)	Gap between segments ending at different points along SR 653 Gap between segments ending at different points along SR 35
Spotsylvania	5.10	8.21	Hanover County line	Mount Olive Road Shirleys Hill Road	SR 605 (Marye Road)	Gap between segments ending at different points along SR 738
Stafford	4.98	8.01	SR 635 (Decatur Road)	Brent Point Road	Dead End	
Surry	0.73	1.17	Line D	Chippokes State Park Road	Dead End	Gap between segments ending at different points along Line A Gap between Loop NORTH and a dead end
Sussex	2.43	3.91	SR 40 (Sussex Drive)	Unnamed road Flatfoot Road Halifax Road Flatfoot Road Halifax Road Flatfoot Road	US 301 (Blue Star Highway)	
Tazewell	2.80	4.51	SR 644 (Boissevain Road/Abbs Valley Road)	Rosenbraum Road	SR 644 (Boissevain Road)	
Warren	5.65	9.09	US 522 (Winchester Road)	Rockland Road	Clarke County line	Gap between segments ending at different points along SR 639
Washington	0.41	0.66	SR 75 (Green Spring Road)	Lombardy Lane	SR 670 (Denton Valley Road)	
Westmoreland	3.08	4.96	SR 628 (Stoney Knoll Road)	Monroe Bay Circle	SR 1300 (San Juan Drive)	
Wise	9.20	14.81	SR 813 (Old Norton Coeburn Road)	Riverview Road Central Street Crab Orchard Road	SR 657	
Wythe	0.60	0.97	SR 600 (Saint Lukes Road)	ODell Road	Dead End	
York	1.40	2.25	SR 620 (Lakeside Drive)	Yorkville Road	SR 738 (Oyster Cove Road)	
