= Virginia State Route 97 =

State highway in western Virginia, US

State Route 97
- Pipers Gap Road

Route information
- Maintained by VDOT
- Length: 9.16 mi (14.74 km)
- Existed: 1933–present

Major junctions
- West end: SR 89 in Galax
- East end: SR 608 / SR 620 at Blue Ridge Parkway

Location
- Country: United States
- State: Virginia
- Counties: City of Galax, Grayson, Carroll

Highway system
- Virginia Routes; Interstate; US; Primary; Secondary; Byways; History; HOT lanes
← SR 96	→ SR 98

State Route 97 (SR 97) is a primary state highway in the U.S. state of Virginia. Known as Pipers Gap Road, the state highway runs 9.16 miles (14.74 km) from SR 89 in Galax east to SR 608 and SR 620 next to the Blue Ridge Parkway.

== Route description ==
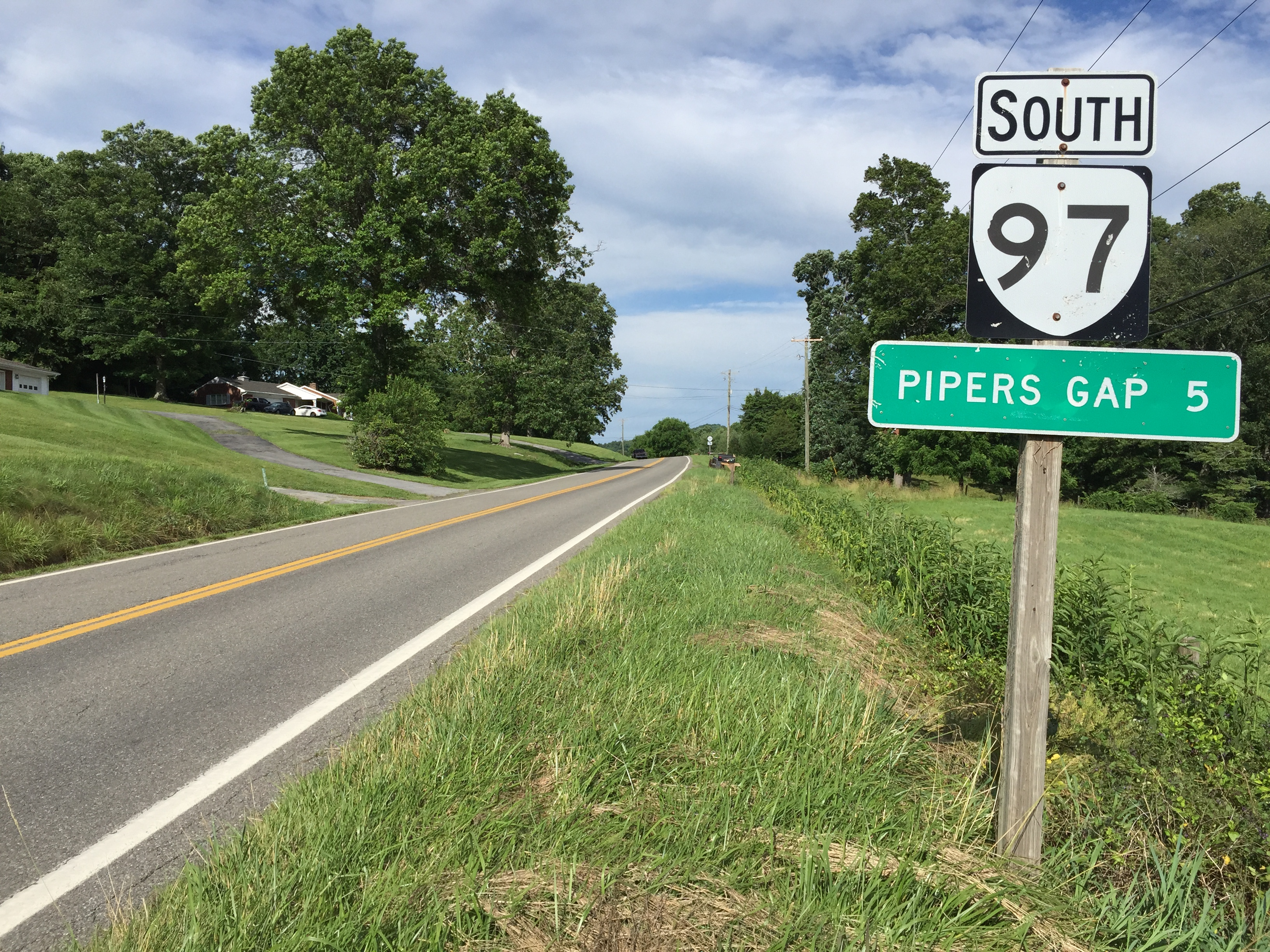
View south along SR 97 south of SR 608 in southwestern Carroll County

SR 97 begins at an intersection with SR 89 (Main Street) in the independent city of Galax. The state highway heads east and immediately exits the city limits and enters Grayson County. SR 97 parallels Chestnut Creek until the highway enters Carroll County, then follows Wards Mill Branch to its source near the hamlet of Pipers Gap. The state highway continues southeast to the hamlet of Drenn adjacent to Pipers Gap, the wind gap of the Blue Ridge Mountains at the Eastern Continental Divide. There, SR 775 (Chances Creek Road) continues straight while SR 97 turns south to its eastern terminus at the intersection of SR 608 (Mt. Carroll Road) and SR 620 (Lambsburg Road). SR 620 continues southeast under the Blue Ridge Parkway overpass to descend the eastern side of the Blue Ridge. SR 608 heads southwest to an intersection with the Blue Ridge Parkway.

== Major intersections ==
County	Location	mi	km	Destinations	Notes
Carroll	Pipers Gap	0.00	0.00	SR 608 (Misty Trail) / SR 620 (Lambsburg Road) to Blue Ridge Parkway	Southern terminus
Carroll	Drenn			SR 775 (Chances Creek Road) to I-77	to SR 148
Grayson	No major junctions				
City of Galax		9.16	14.74	SR 89 (Main Street)	Northern terminus
1.000 mi = 1.609 km; 1.000 km = 0.621 mi

< SR 46	Two‑digit State Routes; 1923-1933	SR 48 >
