= Virginia State Route 608 =

Secondary state highway in Virginia, United States

State Route 608

Route information
- Maintained by VDOT

Location
- Country: United States
- State: Virginia

Highway system
- Virginia Routes; Interstate; US; Primary; Secondary; Byways; History; HOT lanes

State Route 608 (SR 608) in the U.S. state of Virginia is a secondary route designation applied to multiple discontinuous road segments among the many counties. The list below describes the sections in each county that are designated SR 608.

== List ==
County	Length (mi)	Length (km)	From	Via	To	Notes
Accomack	1.20	1.93	SR 607 (Coal Kiln Road)	Mappsburg Road	SR 182 (Edmund Street)	
Albemarle	1.40	2.25	SR 645 (Magnolia Road)	Happy Creek Road	SR 646 (Lovers Lane)	
Alleghany	1.32	2.12	Dead End	Wolfe Road	SR 18 (Potts Creek Road)	
Amelia	6.93	11.15	SR 614 (Dennisville Road)	Little Patrick Road Rock Castle Lane	Dead End	Gap between segments ending at different points along SR 153
Amherst	5.18	8.34	SR 736 (Winton Road)	Campbells Mill Road Toytown Road	SR 739 (Honey Bee Drive)	Gap between segments ending at different points along US 29
Appomattox	17.72	28.52	Campbell County Line	Stonewall Road	SR 616 (Wildway Road)	
Augusta	32.75	52.71	Rockbridge County Line	Cold Springs Road Lofton Road Draft Avenue Tinkling Spring Road Long Meadow Road Battlefield Road	SR 865 (Rockfish Road)	Gap between segments ending at different points along SR 1511 Gap between SR 935/SR 285 and US 250
Bath	0.40	0.64	Dead End	Tinkertown Road	US 220 (Ingalls Boulevard)	
Bedford	24.97	40.19	Pittsylvania County Line	Tolers Ferry Road White House Road Altice Road Emmaus Church Road	SR 24 (Stewartsville Road)	Gap between segments ending at different points along SR 626 Gap between segments ending at different points along SR 654 Gap between segments ending at different points along SR 749
Bland	14.62	23.53	SR 42 (Bluegrass Trail)	Skydusky Road Price Ridge Road Wesendonick Road	SR 606 (Wilderness Road)	Gap between segments ending at different points along SR 606
Botetourt	6.51	10.48	Frontage Road FR-54	Indian Rock Road Gilmers Mill Road	Rockbridge County Line	
Brunswick	4.23	6.81	SR 712 (Old Stage Road)	Smoky Ordinary Road	Greensville County Line	
Buchanan	3.60	5.79	SR 611 (Greenbrier)	Right Fork Greenbrier	Dead End	
Buckingham	5.95	9.58	Prince Edward County Line	Deer Run Road Elcan Road	SR 635 (Buckingham Springs Road)	Gap between segments ending at different points along SR 636
Campbell	0.19	0.31	US 460/SR 24 (Richmond Highway)	Stonewall Road	Appomattox County Line	
Caroline	5.34	8.59	SR 630 (Sparta Road)	Seals Road Lakewood Road	US 301 Bus	Gap between segments ending at SR 641 and a dead end
Carroll	29.61	47.65	Grayson County Line	Coal Creek Road Max Lane Misty Trail Old Appalachian Trail Ranger Road Lightning Ridge Road Dusty Ridge Road Boundary Road Groundhog Mountain Road Pilot View Road Pilot View Drive	Patrick County Line	Gap between segments ending at different points along SR 715 Gap between SR 97 and SR 700 Gap between segments ending at different points along US 52 Gap between segments ending at different points along the Blue Ridge Parkway Gap between segments ending at different points along SR 631
Charles City	1.59	2.56	Dead End	Shirley Plantation	SR 5 (John Tyler Memorial Highway)	
Charlotte	7.52	12.10	SR 607 (Roanoke Station Road)	Rocky Branch Road Public Fork Road Tobacco Hill Road Salem School Road Atkins Road	Dead End	Gap between segments ending at different points along SR 92 Gap between segments ending at different points along US 15
Chesterfield	1.38	2.22	Dead End	General Boulevard Reymet Road	SR 614 (Coach Road)	Gap between segments ending at different points along US 1
Clarke	7.29	11.73	SR 621	Unnamed road	West Virginia State Line	Gap between segments ending at different points along SR 7
Craig	0.60	0.97	SR 685 (Fenwick Mines Road)	Mill Creek Lane	SR 615	
Culpeper	2.30	3.70	Madison County Line	Oakland Road	SR 644 (Reva Road)	
Cumberland	5.04	8.11	SR 624 (Sugarfork Road)	Sugarfork Road Sports Lake Road Royal Oak Road	Dead End	
Dickenson	0.90	1.45	SR 83	Unnamed road	Dead End	
Dinwiddie	0.46	0.74	US 460	Zion Road Johnson Road	Prince George County Line	Gap between SR 622 and the Petersburg City Limits
Essex	0.30	0.48	Dead End	Bareford Mill Road	SR 607 (Upright Road)	
Fairfax	9.76	15.71	US 29 (Lee Highway)	West Ox Road Frying Pan Road	SR 28 (Sully Road)	Gap between SR 7605 and SR 665
Fauquier	1.09	1.75	US 17 (Marsh Road)	Clarks Road	Dead End	
Floyd	5.98	9.62	SR 679 (Bethlehem Church Road)	Sunny Ridge Road Hale Road Ridge Road Laurel Church Road	Dead End	Two gaps between segments ending at different points along SR 676
Fluvanna	7.60	12.23	SR 659 (Cedar Lane Road)	Wilmington Road Rising Sun Road Barnaby Road	SR 613 (Bybees Church Road)	Gap between segments ending at different points along SR 632
Franklin	8.44	13.58	Henry County Line	Fork Mountain Road	SR 762 (Providence Church Road)	
Frederick	24.70	39.75	SR 55 (Wardensville Pike)	Wardensville Grade Dicks Hollow Road Old Bethel Church Road Hunting Ridge Road	SR 681 (Chestnut Grove Road)	Gap between segments ending at different points along SR 600 Gap between segments ending at different points along US 50 Gap between segments ending at different points along SR 679 Gap between segments ending at different points along US 522
Giles	2.90	4.67	SR 777 (Apache Road)	Brickyard Road	SR 783 (Maybrook Road)	
Gloucester	1.96	3.15	SR 198 (Dutton Road)	Hell Neck Road	Dead End	
Goochland	7.83	12.60	Dead End	Elk Hill Road Davis Mill Road	SR 673 (Whitehall Road)	
Grayson	1.10	1.77	SR 97	Coal Creek Road	Carroll County Line	
Greene	0.46	0.74	SR 633 (Dairy Loop)	Stephens Loop	US 33 (Spotswood Trail)	
Greensville	11.25	18.11	Brunswick County Line	Smokey Ordinary Road Wyatts Mill Road	SR 610 (Allen Road)	
Halifax	3.40	5.47	SR 610 (Clays Mill Road)	Cole Lane Rev Coleman Road	SR 607 (Rodgers Chapel Road)	Gap between dead ends
Hanover	5.80	9.33	Louisa County Line	Parsons Road	SR 631 (Old Ridge Road)	
Henry	0.33	0.53	SR 657 (Rockwood Park Road)	Pawnee Lane	Franklin County Line	
Highland	0.70	1.13	US 220	Unnamed road	Dead End	
Isle of Wight	2.40	3.86	Suffolk City Limits	Tyler Drive	SR 636 (Old Suffolk Road)	
James City	2.32	3.73	SR 600 (Six Mount Zion Road)	Mount Laurel Road	SR 606 (Ware Creek Road)	
King and Queen	5.08	8.18	SR 678 (Centerville Road)	Clancie Road Royal Oak School Road	Cul-de-Sac	Gap between segments ending at different points along SR 609
King George	3.17	5.10	SR 694 (Lambs Creek Church Road)	Igo Road Muscoe Place	Dead End	Gap between segments ending at different points along SR 609
King William	12.18	19.60	SR 600 (River Road)	Hazelwood Road Locust Hill Road Globe Road Upshaw Road	SR 600 (River Road)	Gap between segments ending at different points along SR 628 Gap between segments ending at different points along SR 609 Gap between segments ending at different points along SR 30
Lancaster	2.77	4.46	SR 1026 (School Street)	Augusta Street Waverly Avenue Unnamed road	Dead End	Gap between segments ending at different points along SR 3
Lee	1.30	2.09	SR 603 (Back Valley Road	Asbury Road	SR 604 (Blackwater Road)	
Loudoun	0.49	0.79	SR 662 (Loudoun Orchard Road)	Foxhill Road	Dead End	
Louisa	2.20	3.54	SR 701 (Belle Meade Road)	Signboard Road	Hanover County Line	
Lunenburg	0.55	0.89	Dead End	Old Road	SR 602 (Longview Drive)	
Madison	0.20	0.32	SR 607 (Ridgeview Road)	Oakland Road	Culpeper County Line	
Mathews	4.10	6.60	SR 14 (John Clayton Memorial Highway)	Hamburg Road Potato Neck Road	Dead End	
Mecklenburg	2.80	4.51	Dead End	Ridge Road	SR 660 (Old Cox Road)	
Middlesex	0.80	1.29	SR 640 (Waterview Road)	Millstone Landing Road	Dead End	
Montgomery	0.09	0.14	SR 637 (Jewell Drive)	Jewel Drive	Dead End	
Nelson	1.30	2.09	Dead End	Fox Hollow Road	SR 609 (Glass Hollow Road)	
New Kent	7.24	11.65	SR 155/SR 249	Old River Road	SR 606 (Old Church Road)	
Northampton	1.20	1.93	SR 600 (Seaside Drive)	Brownsville Road	Dead End	
Northumberland	3.69	5.94	SR 200 (East Church Street)	Bluff Point Road Jarvis Point Road	Dead End	Gap between segments ending at different points along SR 669
Nottoway	5.30	8.53	SR 609 (Green Hill Road/Yellowbird Road)	Old Shore Road	SR 153 (Rocky Hill Road)	
Orange	3.30	5.31	Spotsylvania County Line	Catharpin Road Dulin Lane Meadow Road	Dead End	Gap between segments ending at different points along SR 621
Page	0.97	1.56	SR 603 (Fleeburg Road)	Grindstone Mountain Road	Dead End	
Pittsylvania	3.45	5.55	SR 605 (Toshes Road)	Ridgeway Road	Bedford County Line	
Powhatan	0.20	0.32	SR 622 (Clayville Road)	Moore Road	Dead End	
Prince Edward	3.86	6.21	SR 626 (Pin Oak Road)	Prospect Road First Rock Road	Buckingham County Line	Gap between segments ending at different points along US 460 (Prince Edward Highway)
Prince George	3.36	5.41	US 301 (Crater Road)	Garys Church Road Johnson Road	Dinwiddie County Line	
Prince William	1.60	2.57	SR 646 (Aden Road)	Orlando Road	SR 648 (Keyser Road)	
Pulaski	0.70	1.13	Wythe County Line	Boone Furnace Road	SR 607 (Little Reed Island Road)	
Rappahannock	0.90	1.45	SR 600 (Woodward Road)	Ashby Road	SR 231 (F T Valley Road)	
Richmond	5.38	8.66	SR 642 (Sharps Road)	Farnham Creek Road	SR 3 (History Land Highway)	
Roanoke	0.30	0.48	US 220 Alt (Cloverdale Road)	Kingsman Road	Botetourt County Line	
Rockbridge	32.73	52.67	Botetourt County Line	Unnamed road Forge Road Unnamed road Bottom Road	Augusta County Line	Gap between segments ending at different points along SR 130 Gap between segments ending at different points along SR 684 Gap between segments ending at different points along US 60 Gap between SR 703 and a dead end Gap between dead ends Gap between segments ending at different points on the boundary of the George Washington National Forest Gap between segments ending at different points along SR 56
Rockingham	3.09	4.97	US 11 (Valley Pike)	Mauzy Athlone Road	SR 620 (Mountain Valley Road)	
Russell	2.19	3.52	SR 63 (Dante Road)	Straight Highway Straight Hollow Road	SR 830 (Stoney Hollow Road)	Gap between segments ending at different points along SR 627
Scott	2.13	3.43	SR 72	Unnamed road	SR 607 (Chestnut Ridge Road)	
Shenandoah	1.20	1.93	SR 675 (Stoney Creek Road)	South Hollingsworth Road	Dead End	
Smyth	1.20	1.93	Washington County Line	Unnamed road	SR 762 (White Top Avenue)	
Southampton	4.30	6.92	SR 655 (Brandy Pond Road)	Everett Road Mill Neck Road	Sussex County Line	Gap between segments ending at different points along SR 609
Spotsylvania	25.92	41.71	Orange County Line	West Catharpin Road Robert E Lee Drive Massaponax Church Road Benchmark Road	US 17 Bus/SR 2 (Tidewater Trail)	Gap between segments ending at different points along SR 208 Gap between SR 613 and SR 208 Bus Gap between segments ending at different points along US 17
Stafford	11.24	18.09	SR 605 (New Hope Church Road)	Brooke Road	Dead End	
Surry	3.40	5.47	SR 602 (Laurel Springs Road)	Oak Hill Road	SR 40 (Martin Luther King Junior Highway)	
Sussex	6.65	10.70	SR 642 (Coman Wells Road)	Poole Road Unnamed road	Southampton County Line	Gap between segments ending at different points along SR 632 Gap between segments ending at different points along SR 631
Tazewell	8.37	13.47	Dead End	Unnamed road Hogback Road Laurel Gap Road	SR 637 (Pounding Mill Branch Road)	Gap between segments ending at different points along SR 91
Warren	0.45	0.72	SR 613	Wilson Burke Road	SR 619 (Mountain Road)	
Washington	4.99	8.03	SR 762 (Loves Mill)	Friendship Road	Smyth County Line	
Westmoreland	1.91	3.07	SR 203 (Kinsale Road)	Kinsale Road White Point Road	Dead End	
Wise	0.70	1.13	Dead End	Williams Hollow Road	US 58 Alt (Pennington Gap Highway)	
Wythe	11.21	18.04	Carroll County Line	Riggins Road Pauley-Flatwood Road Foster Falls Road Unnamed road Foster Falls Road Unnamed road	Pulaski County Line	Gap between segments ending at different points along US 52
York	0.45	0.72	Dead End	Catesby Lane	SR 605 (Winthrop Road)	
