= Virginia State Route 660 =

State highway in Virginia, United States

State Route 660

Route information
- Maintained by VDOT

Location
- Country: United States
- State: Virginia

Highway system
- Virginia Routes; Interstate; US; Primary; Secondary; Byways; History; HOT lanes

State Route 660 (SR 660) in the U.S. state of Virginia is a secondary route designation applied to multiple discontinuous road segments among the many counties. The list below describes the sections in each county that are designated SR 660.

== List ==
County	Length (mi)	Length (km)	From	Via	To	Notes
Accomack	4.68	7.53	Dead End	Mink Farm Road New Branch Road Jersey Street	SR 764 (Accomac Road)	Gap between segments ending at different points along SR 658 Gap between segments ending at different points along SR 659
Albemarle	6.44	10.36	SR 676 (Woodlands Road)	Reas Ford Road Earlysville Forest Drive	SR 743 (Advance Mills Road)	
Amelia	1.55	2.49	Dead End	Mills Lane	SR 608 (Little Patrick Road)	
Amherst	0.49	0.79	US 29 Bus	MacAdam Road	Dead End	
Appomattox	2.80	4.51	SR 613 (Police Tower Road/Spring Grove Road)	North Creek Road	SR 26 (Oakville Road)	
Augusta	1.40	2.25	Dead End	Lake Road	SR 610 (Howardsville Turnpike)	
Bath	0.24	0.39	US 220 (Ingalls Boulevard)	Fairview Lane	Dead End	
Bedford	4.50	7.24	SR 621 (Cottontown Road)	Hawkins Mill Road Old Farm Road	SR 644 (Coffee Road)	
Bland	0.10	0.16	Dead End	ML Thompson Drive	SR 61 (Wolf Creek Highway)	
Botetourt	1.05	1.69	US 221/US 460	Coyner Springs Road	Dead End	
Brunswick	3.05	4.91	North Carolina state line	Parker Road Siovan Road	SR 903 (Hendricks Mill Road)	
Buchanan	1.10	1.77	Dead End	Long Branch Road	SR 624 (Garden Creek Road)	
Buckingham	3.98	6.41	SR 56 (James River Highway)	Shelton Store Road	SR 601 (Pattie Road)	
Campbell	6.47	10.41	Lynchburg city limits	East Brook Road Oxford Furnace Road	SR 24 (Village Highway)	
Caroline	1.50	2.41	SR 607 (Guinea Station Road)	Claiborne Crossing Road	SR 609 (Macedonia Road)	
Carroll	1.70	2.74	Dead End	Fairhaven Road	SR 628 (Burkes Fork Road)	
Charles City	0.32	0.51	Dead End	Munford Drive	SR 155 (Courthouse Road)	
Charlotte	5.45	8.77	SR 650 (Hill Cross Road)	Virginian Road Taro Road	SR 671 (County Line Road)	Gap between segments ending at different points along SR 47
Chesterfield	0.60	0.97	Dead End	Adventure Hill Lane	SR 621 (Winterpock Road)	
Clarke	3.21	5.17	SR 7 (Harry Flood Byrd Highway)	Russell Road Wrights Mill Road	Dead End at Opequan Creek	
Craig	0.25	0.40	Dead End	Stonewall Lane	SR 42 (Cumberland Gap Road)	
Culpeper	0.95	1.53	Dead End	Highland Road	SR 647 (Batna Road)	
Cumberland	3.00	4.83	SR 640 (Holman Mill Road)	Horsepen Road	SR 639 (Putney Road)	
Dickenson	6.40	10.30	SR 604	Bear Ridge Road	SR 699 (Counts Ridge Road)	
Dinwiddie	6.69	10.77	SR 619 (Courthouse Road)	Hardiways Mill Road Old Vaughan Road Quaker Road	US 1 (Boydton Plank Road)	Gap between segments ending at different points along SR 605
Essex	1.10	1.77	Dead End	Southland Farm Road	SR 684 (Bowlers Road)	
Fairfax	3.86	6.21	SR 5590 (Newman Road)	Fairfax Station Road Adare Drive	Cul-de-Sac	
Fauquier	2.50	4.02	SR 651 (Freemans Ford Road)	Saint Pauls Road	SR 661 (Botha Road)	
Floyd	4.63	7.45	SR 612 (Stonewall Road)	Daniels Run Road Goose Creek Run Road	SR 653 (Alleghany Springs Road)	Gap between segments ending at different points along SR 610
Fluvanna	3.14	5.05	SR 640 (Haden Martin Road)	Sclaters Ford Road Ruritan Lake Road	SR 53 (Thomas Jefferson Parkway)	
Franklin	2.42	3.89	SR 40/SR 626	Morgans Fork Road Mount Zion Road	Dead End	
Frederick	2.78	4.47	SR 7 (Berryville Pike)	Woods Mill Road High Banks Road	Dead End	Gap between segments ending at different points along SR 664
Giles	2.95	4.75	Dead End	Eaton Lane Staffordsville Road Post Office Road	SR 750 (Cedar Crest Lane)	Gap between segments ending at different points along SR 659
Gloucester	0.22	0.35	SR 623 (Ware Neck Road)	Eastwind Road	Dead End	
Goochland	0.25	0.40	Dead End	Childress Road	SR 622 (Rockville Road)	
Grayson	10.77	17.33	US 21 (Elk Creek Parkway)	Carsonville Road	SR 274 (Riverside Drive)	
Greene	0.28	0.45	SR 607 (Matthew Mill Road)	Iroquois Trail	SR 661 (Mohican Trail)	
Greensville	5.65	9.09	SR 656	Fiddlers Road	SR 730 (Low Ground Road)	
Halifax	0.85	1.37	Pittsylvania County line	Glass Mill Road	SR 662 (Birch Elmo Road)	
Hanover	2.56	4.12	US 33 (Mountain Road)	Winns Church Road	SR 623 (Cedar Lane)	
Henry	0.67	1.08	US 220 Bus (Virginia Avenue)	Oakland Drive Meadow Lane Lee Street	SR 609 (Daniel Creek Road)	
Highland	0.12	0.19	SR 617	Unnamed road	SR 617	
Isle of Wight	1.47	2.37	SR 604 (Riddick Road)	Lankford Lane Spady Lane	Dead End	
James City	0.04	0.06	SR 656 (Woodside Drive)	Juniper Court	Cul-de-Sac	
King and Queen	2.10	3.38	SR 721 (Newtown Road)	Sorghum Road	SR 619 (Owens Mill Road)	
King George	0.25	0.40	Dead End	Canning Way	SR 607 (Port Conway Road)	
King William	0.25	0.40	SR 632 (Mount Olive-Cohoke Road)	Canaan Road	Dead End	
Lancaster	0.70	1.13	SR 222 (Weems Road)	James Lane Wharton Grove Lane	Dead End	Gap between segments ending at different points along SR 222
Lee	3.71	5.97	SR 661 (Flatwoods Road)	Hardy Creek Road	US 58	
Loudoun	0.90	1.45	SR 662 (Lost Corner Road)	Nolands Ferry Road	Dead End	
Louisa	4.21	6.78	SR 675 (Lindsay Road)	Red Hill Road	SR 860 (Klockner Road)	
Lunenburg	0.80	1.29	Dead End	Forest Drive	SR 138 (South Hill Road)	
Madison	0.08	0.13	Dead End	Courthouse Mountain Road	US 29 Bus (Main Street)	
Mathews	6.59	10.61	Loop	Grace Street River Road	SR 14 (John Clayton Memorial Highway)	Formerly SR 224
Mecklenburg	15.91	25.60	SR 92	Old Cox Road	SR 47	
Middlesex	0.59	0.95	Dead End	Jackson Creek Road Recycling Drive	Dead End	
Montgomery	1.70	2.74	SR 719 (Switchback Road)	Crab Mill Road	SR 661 (Chrisman Mill Road)	
Nelson	0.50	0.80	SR 657 (Tye River Road)	Rives Lane	Dead End	
New Kent	0.40	0.64	SR 655 (Old Ferry Road)	Vermont Road	Dead End	
Northampton	0.70	1.13	SR 600 (Seaside Drive)	Ballard Drive	SR 603 (Willis Wharf Road)	
Northumberland	0.30	0.48	SR 646 (Fairport Road)	McNeal Road	Dead End	
Nottoway	2.40	3.86	SR 153 (Rocky Hill Road)	Poplar Lawn Road	Dead End	
Orange	2.00	3.22	SR 621 (Mine Run Road)	Old Lawyers Road	SR 692 (Saint Just Road)	
Page	2.00	3.22	SR 656	Unnamed road	Dead End	
Patrick	5.42	8.72	North Carolina state line	Five Forks Road Russell Creek Road	SR 652 (Shingle Shop Road)	
Pittsylvania	2.87	4.62	Halifax County line	Alderson Road Reeves Mill Road	SR 360 (Old Richmond Road)	
Prince Edward	6.60	10.62	SR 665 (Darlington Heights Road)	Heights School Road	US 460	
Prince William	3.12	5.02	SR 619 (Bristow Road)	Milford Road Piper Lane Hornbaker Road	SR 674 (Wellington Road)	Gap between a dead end and the NS Railroad tracks Gap between segments ending at different points along SR 28
Pulaski	6.44	10.36	Dead End	Claytor Lake State Park Road	SR 611 (Wilderness Road)	
Rappahannock	0.64	1.03	Dead End	Waterfall Road	SR 610 (Chester Gap Road)	
Richmond	0.50	0.80	Dead End	Cobham Park Lane	SR 630 (Wellfords Wharf Road)	
Roanoke	1.48	2.38	SR 617 (Pitzer Road)	Brookridge Road	SR 617 (Pitzer Road)	
Rockbridge	0.40	0.64	Dead End	Bull Run Lane	SR 644	
Rockingham	0.80	1.29	SR 663 (Browns Gap Road)	Mishalany Drive	Dead End	
Russell	1.74	2.80	SR 657 (Greenvalley Road)	Coal Tipple Hollow Road	Lebanon town limits	
Scott	6.41	10.32	SR 619	Unnamed road Obeys Creek Road	SR 659 (River Bluff Road)	Gap between segments ending at different points along SR 72
Shenandoah	1.38	2.22	SR 622 (Clary Road)	Timberlake Road	SR 629 (Oranda Road)	
Smyth	9.15	14.73	Dead End	Sapwood Drive Tallwood Drive Adwolf Road Riverside Road	SR 649 (Need More Road)	Gap between FR-5 and US 11
Southampton	2.60	4.18	SR 659 (Pinopolis Road)	Fox Branch Road	SR 658 (Cedar View Road)	
Spotsylvania	0.70	1.13	SR 634 (Flippo Drive)	Len Hart Lane	Dead End	
Stafford	0.35	0.56	US 1 (Jefferson Davis Highway)	George Mason Road	Dead End	
Surry	0.30	0.48	SR 10 (Colonial Trail)	Goodson Path	Dead End	
Sussex	4.85	7.81	SR 635	Gilliam Road Unnamed road	SR 632 (Gilliam Road)	
Tazewell	2.70	4.35	SR 643 (Mud Fork Road)	Loop Road	SR 102	
Warren	2.48	3.99	SR 615 (Wakeman Mill Road)	Wakeman Mill Road Unnamed road	Dead End	Gap between segments ending at different points along SR 626
Washington	0.40	0.64	Dead End	Canter Lane	SR 659 (Buffalo Pond Road)	
Westmoreland	0.70	1.13	Dead End	Parham Point Road	SR 612 (Coles Point Road)	
Wise	3.75	6.04	Dead End	Unnamed road	Dead End	Gap between segments ending at different points along SR 658
Wythe	0.70	1.13	SR 661 (Sally Run Road)	Unnamed road	SR 659 (Rockdale Road)	
York	1.75	2.82	Dead End	Baptist Road	SR 238 (Old Williamsburg Road)	
