= Virginia State Route 620 =

Secondary state highway in Virginia, United States

State Route 620

Route information
- Maintained by VDOT

Location
- Country: United States
- State: Virginia

Highway system
- Virginia Routes; Interstate; US; Primary; Secondary; Byways; History; HOT lanes

State Route 620 (SR 620) in the U.S. state of Virginia is a secondary route designation applied to multiple discontinuous road segments among the many counties. The list below describes the sections in each county that are designated SR 620.

== List ==
County	Length (mi)	Length (km)	From	Via	To	Notes
Accomack	7.39	11.89	SR 609 (Big Pine Road)	Sisco Town Road Front Street Unnamed road Keller Pond Road West Street Center Avenue Hollies Church Road Warehouse Road	Dead End	Gap between segments ending at different points along SR 609
Albemarle	6.21	9.99	Fluvanna County Line	Rolling Road	SR 795 (President Road)	
Alleghany	0.20	0.32	SR 616 (Rich Patch Road)	Watahala Lane	Dead End	
Amelia	5.56	8.95	SR 616 (Genito Road)	Rodophil Road Reed Rock Road Stony Point Road	Cumberland County Line	Gap between segments ending at different points along SR 621
Amherst	0.60	0.97	SR 778 (Lowesville Road)	Totsie Floyd Road	SR 665 (Flat Woods Road)	
Appomattox	7.00	11.27	SR 601 (Forest Chapel Road)	Old Bethany Road	SR 630 (Old Evergreen Road)	
Augusta	9.48	15.26	Rockbridge County Line	Pisgah Road Newport Road Old Providence Road Newport Road Spotts Woods Road	US 11 (Lee Jackson Highway)	Gap between segments ending at different points along SR 252 Two gaps between segments ending at different points along SR 919
Bath	1.55	2.49	SR 39 (Mountain Valley Road)	West Warm Springs Drive	SR 39	
Bedford	0.22	0.35	SR 661 (Homestead Drive)	Bateman Bridge Road	US 221 (Forest Road)	
Bland	1.80	2.90	Dead End	White Pine Drive	SR 615 (Suiter Road)	
Botetourt	0.72	1.16	SR 618 (Middle Creek Road/Chestnut Run Road)	Inn Road	Dead End	
Brunswick	4.70	7.56	Lunenburg County Line	Old Poole Road	SR 652 (Foundry Creek Road)	
Buchanan	16.09	25.89	SR 83	Unnamed road Indian Gap Road Deskins Road Unnamed road	SR 83 (Dickenson Highway)	
Buckingham	0.99	1.59	Dead End	Mill Road	US 15	
Caroline	0.19	0.31	SR 652 (Ruther Glen Road)	Chesterfield Road	Dead End	
Carroll	24.33	39.16	North Carolina State Line	Old Pipers Gap Road Lambsburg Road Crooked Creek Road Harrison Ridge Road Forest Oak Road Coulson Church Road	US 52 (Poplar Camp Road)	Gap between the Blue Ridge Parkway and SR 97
Charles City	2.51	4.04	SR 609 (Barnetts Road)	Lewis Tyler Lane	SR 618 (Adkins Road)	
Charlotte	2.80	4.51	SR 619 (Staunton Hill Road)	Clarkton Bridge Road	Dead End	
Chesterfield	3.77	6.07	US 1 (Jefferson Davis Highway)	Woods Edge Road Golf Course Road	SR 618 (Old Bermuda Hundred Road)	Gap between segments ending at different points along SR 617
Clarke	4.50	7.24	SR 655 (Salem Church Road)	Pyletown Road Browntown Road	SR 255 (Bishop Meade Highway)	
Craig	2.34	3.77	Roanoke County Line	Miller Cove	SR 621 (Upper Craig Creek Road)	
Culpeper	8.18	13.16	SR 3 (Germanna Highway)	Yellowbottom Road Edwards Shop Road	Fauquier County Line	Gap between segments ending at different points along SR 610
Cumberland	0.80	1.29	Amelia County Line	Stoney Point Mill Lane	SR 600 (Stoney Point Road)	
Dickenson	1.80	2.90	Dead End	Unnamed road	SR 631 (Brush Creek Road)	
Dinwiddie	4.90	7.89	SR 639 (Wilson Road)	Foster Road White Oak Church Road	Dead End	Gap between segments ending at different points along SR 642 Gap between segments ending at different points along US 460
Essex	11.18	17.99	King and Queen County Line	Powcan Road Dunbrooke Road Lewis Level Road Cheatwood Mill Road	SR 665 (Rexburg Loop)	Gap between segments ending at different points along US 360 Gap between segments ending at different points along SR 619
Fairfax	22.28	35.86	Loudoun County Line	Braddock Road Spindle Court Braddock Road	SR 244 (Columbia Pike)	Gap between SR 28 and Willoughby Newton Drive Gap between US 29 and a dead end
Fauquier	0.20	0.32	Culpeper County Line	Kelly Ford Road	SR 651 (Sumerduck Road)	
Floyd	0.80	1.29	Carroll County Line	Tory Creek Road	US 58 (Danville Pike)	
Fluvanna	7.32	11.78	SR 6 (West River Road)	Rolling Road South	Albemarle County Line	
Franklin	2.12	3.41	SR 652 (Circle Creek)	Campbell Road	SR 969 (Danville Turnpike)	
Frederick	3.80	6.12	SR 622 (Cedar Creek Grade)	Miller Road/Singhass Road	SR 803 (Round Hill Road)	
Giles	0.43	0.69	Dead End	Riverview Lane	SR 622 (Engleston River Road)	
Gloucester	0.26	0.42	SR 656 (Glass Road)	Stonewall Road	Dead End	
Goochland	1.60	2.57	SR 617 (Oilville Road)	Hanover Road	Hanover County Line	
Grayson	0.21	0.34	SR 604 (Rabbit Hollow Road)	Round Hill Circle	SR 604 (Rabbit Hollow Road)	
Greensville	1.50	2.41	SR 605 (Roger Road)	Radium Road	SR 607 (Brunswick Road)	
Halifax	0.20	0.32	SR 626 (Clarkton Road)	Narrow Bridge Road	Charlotte County Line	
Hanover	4.49	7.23	Goochland County Line	Dogwood Trail Road	SR 271 (Pouncey Tract Road)	
Henry	8.45	13.60	SR 650 (Irisburg Road/Spruce Street)	Old Liberty Road Old Liberty Drive Daniel Road Centerville Road	Pittsylvania County Line	Gap between US 58 and SR 610
Highland	6.27	10.09	SR 654 (Johnston Road)	Unnamed road	West Virginia State Line	Gap between segments ending at different points along SR 614
Isle of Wight	17.72	28.52	Southampton County Line	Broadwater Road Foursquare Road Scotts Factory Road Muddy Cross Road Tan Road	SR 660 (Lankford Lane)	Gap between segments ending at different points along SR 644
James City	0.45	0.72	Dead End	Old Richmond Road	US 60 (Richmond Road)	
King and Queen	6.09	9.80	SR 633 (Stones Road)	Duck Pond Road Powcan Road	Essex County Line	Gap between segments ending at different points along SR 14
King George	2.15	3.46	SR 629 (Round Hill Road)	Alden Road	SR 205 (Ridge Road)	
King William	1.00	1.61	SR 30 (King William Road)	Black Gum Road Scotland Landing Road	Dead End	Gap between segments ending at different points along SR 30
Lancaster	1.60	2.57	Dead End	Griffins Landing Road Old Orchard Road	SR 3 (Mary Ball Road)	
Lee	2.50	4.02	US 58 Alt	Hen Reasor	SR 622 (Cave Springs Road)	
Loudoun	5.28	8.50	SR 705 (Braddock Road/Lightridge Farm Road)	Braddock Road	Fairfax County Line	
Louisa	3.16	5.09	SR 639 (Mallorys Ford Road/Doctors Road)	Vawter Corner Road	SR 669 (Ellisville Drive)	
Lunenburg	2.50	4.02	SR 621 (Dix Drive)	Renrut Road Old Poole Road	Brunswick County Line	
Madison	6.30	10.14	SR 231 (Blue Ridge Turnpike)	Race Ground Road Tatums School Road	SR 230 (Orange Road)	Gap between segments ending at different points along SR 231 Gap between segments ending at different points along SR 616
Mathews	2.10	3.38	Dead End	Chapel Neck Road	SR 14 (John Clayton Memorial Highway)	
Mecklenburg	7.68	12.36	SR 626 (Blackridge Road)	Hall Road	SR 624 (Canaan Church Road)	
Middlesex	1.81	2.91	SR 619 (Healys Road)	Philpot Road Nohead Bottom Road	Dead End	
Montgomery	1.60	2.57	Pulaski County Line	Gum Log Road Blue Spring Road	SR 613 (Blue Spring Road/Mountain Pride)	
Nelson	4.40	7.08	SR 623 (Stage Bridge Road)	Starvale Lane Farrar Bridge Lane Rock Spring Road Pleasant Hill Circle	SR 632 (Faber Road)	Gap between segments ending at dead ends Gap between segments ending at different points along SR 617
New Kent	3.10	4.99	SR 603/SR 671	Homestead Road	SR 632 (Stage Road)	
Northampton	2.60	4.18	SR 618 (Johnsontown Road)	Birdsnest Drive Locust Lawn Drive	Dead End	Gap between segments ending at different points along SR 600
Northumberland	2.50	4.02	SR 622 (Harry Hogan Road)	Kissinger Spring Road Hatches Avenue	Dead End	Gap between segments ending at different points along SR 621
Nottoway	1.90	3.06	SR 307 (Holly Farm Road)	Morrisetts Mill Road	SR 617 (Saylers Creek Road)	
Orange	4.20	6.76	SR 611 (Raccoon Road)	Horseshoe Road	SR 611 (Raccoon Road)	
Page	1.80	2.90	Dead End	Cubbage Hollow Road	SR 621	
Patrick	1.55	2.49	SR 613 (North Fork Road)	Apple Tree Drive	SR 613 (Lone Ivy Road)	
Pittsylvania	0.60	0.97	Henry County Line	Centerville Road	US 58/SR 954	
Powhatan	2.46	3.96	Dead End	Mill Quarter Road	SR 13 (Old Buckingham Road)	
Prince Edward	3.94	6.34	Dead End	Thompson Drive Schuffle Town Road	SR 617	Gap between segments ending at different points along SR 619
Prince George	2.90	4.67	SR 638 (Templeton Road)	Tatum Road	SR 627 (Loving Union Road)	
Prince William	0.30	0.48	SR 619 (Joplin Road)	Liming Lane	Dead End	
Pulaski	1.60	2.57	SR 665 (Simpkinstown Road)	Gum Log Road	Montgomery County Line	
Rappahannock	3.75	6.04	US 522 (Zachary Taylor Avenue)	Fletchers Mill Road Five Forks Road	Dead End	
Richmond	5.24	8.43	Dead End	Fallin Town Road Richmond Hill Road Threeway Road	Westmoreland County Line	
Roanoke	3.02	4.86	SR 624 (Newport Road)	Miller Cove Road	Craig County Line	
Rockbridge	3.95	6.36	SR 726	Pisgah Road	Augusta County Line	
Rockingham	20.47	32.94	US 33 (Spotswood Trail)	Indian Trail Road Mountain Valley Road Smith Creek Road	Shenandoah County Line	
Russell	10.66	17.16	Dead End	Paul Barratt Road Finney Road Fuller Drive	Dead End	Gap between segments ending at different points along SR 645 Gap between segments ending at different points along SR 80
Scott	0.40	0.64	Tennessee State Line	Unnamed road	SR 621	
Shenandoah	8.80	14.16	Rockingham County Line	Smith Creek Road	US 11 (Old Valley Pike)	Gap between segments ending at different points along US 211
Smyth	5.60	9.01	SR 42 (Old Wilderness Road)	Haven Ridge Road	Dead End	
Southampton	4.49	7.23	US 460 General Mohone	Broadwater Road	Isle of Wight County Line	
Spotsylvania	13.35	21.48	SR 610 (Elys Ford Road)	Spotswood Furnace Road Harrison Road	US 1 Bus (Lafayette Boulevard)	Gap between segments ending at different points along SR 3
Stafford	0.24	0.39	Dead End	Old Bridge Road	SR 608 (Brooke Road)	
Surry	1.18	1.90	SR 626 (Lebanon Road)	Rocky Bottom Road	SR 31 (Rolfe Highway)	
Sussex	4.59	7.39	SR 622	Unnamed road Brittle Mill Road Brittles Neck Road	SR 628 (Main Street)	
Tazewell	1.70	2.74	SR 67 (Jewell Ridge Road)	Jewell Main Road	SR 621 (Stinson Creek Road)	
Warren	0.60	0.97	Dead End	Bennys Beach Road	SR 658 (Rockland Road)	
Washington	0.90	1.45	SR 614 (Swinging Bridge Road)	Anderson Drive	SR 802 (Mendota Road)	
Westmoreland	0.58	0.93	Richmond County Line	Threeway Road	SR 203 (Oldhams Road)	
Wise	14.36	23.11	Norton City Limits	Guest River Road Unnamed road	SR 671 (North Fork Road)	
Wythe	0.45	0.72	SR 622 (Lone Ash Road)	Depot Street	Dead End	
York	6.87	11.06	Newport News City Limits	Oriana Road Lakeside Drive Railway Road Link Road Holly Point Road	Dead End	
