= Virginia State Route 611 =

State highway in Virginia, United States

State Route 611

Route information
- Maintained by VDOT

Location
- Country: United States
- State: Virginia

Highway system
- Virginia Routes; Interstate; US; Primary; Secondary; Byways; History; HOT lanes

State Route 611 (SR 611) in the U.S. state of Virginia is a secondary route designation applied to multiple discontinuous road segments among the many counties. The list below describes the sections in each county that are designated SR 611.

== List ==
County	Length (mi)	Length (km)	From	Via	To	Notes
Accomack	1.45	2.33	Dead End	Occohannock Drive	SR 612 (Scarbouroughs Neck Road)	
Albemarle	3.15	5.07	Dead End	Jarmans Gap Road	SR 691 (Greenwood Road)	Gap between dead ends
Alleghany	0.40	0.64	Dead End	Stone Mountain Road	SR 610	
Amherst	1.50	2.41	SR 662 (Geddes Mountain Road)	Roses Mill Road	SR 674 (Athole Lane/Roses Mill Road)	
Appomattox	13.70	22.05	Campbell County Line	Paradise Road Trinity Road Bellview Road Abbit Branch Road Lime Plant Road Colemans Mill Road	SR 663 (Colemans Mill Road/Oak Ridge Road)	
Augusta	4.80	7.72	SR 828 (Cattle Scales Road)	Baynes Road Dooms Crossing Road Calf Mountain Road Jarman Gap Road	Dead End	Gap between segments ending at different points along SR 865 Gap between segments ending at different points along SR 622
Bath	1.11	1.79	US 220 (Ingalls Boulevard)	College Lane	Dead End	
Bedford	0.50	0.80	Dead End	Mountain View Heights Road	US 501 (Lee Jackson Highway)	
Bland	2.13	3.43	SR 42 (Bluegrass Trail)	Slide Mountain Road	SR 612 (Kimberling Road)	
Botetourt	7.33	11.80	FR 54 (Frontage Road)	Greyledge Road Buffalo Road	Rockbridge County Line	Gap between segments ending at different points along SR 622
Brunswick	22.50	36.21	Mecklenburg County Line	Alvis Road Dry Bread Road	Greensville County Line	Gap between segments ending at different points along SR 659 Gap between segments ending at different points along SR 676
Buchanan	2.76	4.44	SR 83	Greenbrier	Dead End	
Buckingham	3.45	5.55	SR 671 (Penlan Road/Spreading Oak Road)	Diana Mill Road	SR 652 (Bridgeport Road)	
Campbell	0.50	0.80	SR 609 (Stage Road)	Paradise Hill Road	Appomattox County Line	
Caroline	0.70	1.13	Dead End	Prospect Hill Lane	US 17	
Carroll	7.70	12.39	SR 753 (Double Cabin Road)	Sunnyvale Road Deepwater Road	Floyd County Line	
Charles City	0.25	0.40	SR 630 (Samaria Lane)	Kizze Road	Dead End	
Charlotte	7.45	11.99	US 15/US 360	Hebron Church Road Coleman Ferry Road	SR 608 (Rocky Branch Road)	
Chesterfield	3.85	6.20	SR 10 (Iron Bridge Road)	Kingsland Road	SR 145 (Chester Road)	
Clarke	2.87	4.62	US 340 (Lord Fairfax Highway)	Summit Point Road	West Virginia State Line	Formerly SR 267
Craig	12.07	19.42	SR 311	Peaceful Valley Road	SR 614 (Hawkins Lane)	Gap between segments ending at different points along SR 617 Gap between segments ending at different points along SR 615
Culpeper	5.00	8.05	Rappahannock County Line	Waterford Road	SR 229	
Cumberland	2.50	4.02	SR 45 (Cartersville Road)	Morningside Road	SR 690 (Columbia Road)	
Dickenson	18.83	30.30	SR 631 (Brush Creek Road)	Unnamed road Blowing Rock Road Unnamed road Bartlick Road	SR 80 (Breaks Park Road)	
Dinwiddie	16.25	26.15	SR 627 (Courthouse Road)	Wilkinson Road Trinity Church Road Brown Road Exeter Mill Road	SR 623 (Sutherland Road)	Gap between segments ending at different points along SR 751 Gap between segments ending at different points along SR 627 Gap between segments ending at different points along SR 708
Essex	6.37	10.25	SR 684 (Howerton Road)	Johnville Road Wares Wharf Road	Dead End	
Fairfax	17.07	27.47	SR 123 (Ox Road)	Lorton Road Furnace Road Old Colchester Road Telegraph Road	SR 241 (Kings Highway)	
Fauquier	2.76	4.44	Prince William County Line	Sowego Road New Ford Road	Loudoun County Line	Gap between SR 806 and US 50
Floyd	2.01	3.23	Carroll County Line	Macks Mountain Road	SR 655 (Pulaski Road)	
Fluvanna	1.60	2.57	Dead End	Paynes Landing Road	SR 6 (West River Road)	
Franklin	3.68	5.92	SR 652 (Circle Creek)	Belcher Road	Pittsylvania County Line	Gap between SR 651 and SR 620
Frederick	0.80	1.29	SR 600 (Back Mountain Road)	White Road	SR 612 (Fishel Road)	
Giles	0.03	0.05	SR 729 (Pinehurst Avenue)	Madison Street	Dead End	
Gloucester	0.86	1.38	US 17 (George Washington Memorial Highway)	Owl Trap Road	SR 601 (Pampa Road)	
Goochland	4.13	6.65	SR 673 (Whitehall Road)	Cedar Plains Road	SR 615 (Forest Grove Road)	
Grayson	6.50	10.46	US 21	Caty Sage Pheasant Run Lane Stones Chapel Road Caty Sage Mount Zion Road	SR 658 (Comers Rock Road)	Gap between segments ending at different points along SR 662
Greene	0.22	0.35	SR 667 (Middle River Road)	Liberty Loop	SR 667 (Middle River Road)	
Greensville	11.24	18.09	Brunswick County Line	Dry Bread Road Brick Yard Road	Sussex County Line	Gap between segments ending at different points along SR 633 Gap between segments ending at different points along the Emporia City Limits Gap between segments ending at different points along SR 654
Halifax	3.03	4.88	SR 610 (Clays Mill Road)	Hundley Road	SR 609 (Abbott Hill Road)	
Hanover	11.15	17.94	Louisa County Line	Vontay Road Dunns Chapel Road Saint Peters Church Road	US 33 (Mountain Road)	Gap between segments ending at different points along SR 676
Henry	1.21	1.95	SR 625 (Martin Lane)	Giles Road	SR 650 (Irisburg Road)	
Highland	0.60	0.97	US 220	Unnamed road	Dead End	
Isle of Wight	9.84	15.84	Southampton County Line	Joyners Bridge Road	SR 632 (Old Myrtle Road)	
James City	5.29	8.51	SR 633 (Joly Pond Road/Bush Neck Road)	Jolly Pond Road	SR 614 (Centerville Road)	
King and Queen	4.60	7.40	SR 609 (Iris Road)	Tastine Road Water Lane	Dead End	Gap between segments ending at different points along SR 14
King George	2.71	4.36	SR 205 (Ridge Road)	Hanover Church Road Eden Drive	SR 206 (Dahlgren Road)	
King William	4.92	7.92	SR 605 (Manfield Road)	Venter Road Walnut Lane	Dead End	
Lancaster	3.58	5.76	Dead End	West Point Road Hoecake Road	Dead End	Gap between segments ending at different points along SR 604
Lee	7.60	12.23	SR 612 (Kane Gap Road)	Hippie Hollow Road Jasper Road	US 23	
Loudoun	18.77	30.21	Fauquier County Line	Saint Louis Road Telegraph Springs Road Purcellville Road	SR 693 (Morrisonville Road)	Gap between segments ending at different points along SR 734 Gap between segments ending at different points along the Purcellville Town Line
Louisa	5.63	9.06	US 250 (Broad Street Road)	Oakland Church Road Dongola Road Octagon Road	Hanover County Line	
Lunenburg	3.00	4.83	SR 138 (Hill Road)	Hinkle Road	SR 138 (Hill Road)	
Madison	2.50	4.02	SR 600 (Bohannon Road)	Shotwell Hollow Road	SR 231 (F T Valley Road)	
Mathews	7.15	11.51	SR 14 (John Clayton Memorial Highway)	Church Street Tabernacle Road	Dead End	Gap between segments ending at different points along SR 14
Mecklenburg	1.50	2.41	SR 626 (Blackridge Road)	Newell Road	Brunswick County Line	
Middlesex	0.30	0.48	Dead End	H & H Lane	US 17 (Tidewater Trail)	
Nelson	4.30	6.92	SR 635 (Greenfield Road)	Ennis Mountain Road	SR 636 (Batesville Road)	
New Kent	5.27	8.48	SR 613 (Dispatch Road)	South Quaker Road	SR 613 (Dispatch Road)	
Northampton	1.30	2.09	SR 183 (Occohannock Neck Road)	Concord Wharf Road	Dead End	
Northumberland	3.00	4.83	SR 600 (Ridge Road)	Lara Ridge Road Gilliams Road	SR 201 (Courthouse Road)	Gap between segments ending at different points along SR 601
Nottoway	10.26	16.51	US 460 Bus	Piney Green Road Little Creek Road	SR 615 (Namozine Road)	Gap between segments ending at different points along SR 607
Orange	14.20	22.85	US 522 (Zachary Taylor Highway)	Raccoon Road Zoar Road Gold Dale Road Parker Road	Spotsylvania County Line	Gap between segments ending at different points along SR 604
Page	19.77	31.82	Shenandoah National Park boundary	Red Gate Road Edgewood Drive Kite Hollow Road Farmview Road Brookstone Road Clearview Road Kimball Road Unnamed road	SR 662 (Rileyville Road)	Gap between segments ending at different points along SR 687 Gap between segments ending at different points along SR 714 Two gaps between segments ending at different points along SR 689 Gap between segments ending at different points along SR 667 Gap between segments ending at different points along US 211 Gap between segments ending at different points along SR 658
Patrick	1.10	1.77	SR 610 (Cloudbreak Road)	Ballard Road	SR 758 (Willis Road)	
Pittsylvania	0.70	1.13	Franklin County Line	Marson Road	Dead End	
Powhatan	2.10	3.38	Dead End	Capeway Road	SR 628 (Lower Hill Road)	
Prince Edward	2.10	3.38	SR 613 (Miller Lake Road)	Quail Crossing Road	SR 612 (Sandy River Road)	
Prince George	12.47	20.07	Dead End	Lebanon Drive Lebanon Road Brandon Road Lebanon Road	Dead End	
Prince William	8.48	13.65	Fauquier County Line	Fleetwood Drive Fleetwood Road Fleetwood Drive Valley View Drive	SR 619 (Bristow Road)	Gap between segments ending at different points along SR 653
Pulaski	9.17	14.76	SR 694 (Wurno Road)	Newbern Road Wilderness Road	Montgomery County Line	Gap between segments ending at different points along SR 1039 Gap between segments ending at different points along SR 660
Rappahannock	2.80	4.51	Culpeper County Line	Waterford Road Seven Ponds Road	US 211 (Lee Highway)	Gap between segments ending at different points along SR 642
Richmond	1.50	2.41	SR 613 (Calvary Church Road)	Conley Pond Road	SR 3 (History Land Highway)	
Roanoke	0.50	0.80	SR 605 (Old Mountain Road)	Read Mountain Road	Dead End	
Rockbridge	8.91	14.34	Botetourt County Line	South Buffalo Road	SR 612 (Blue Grass Trail)	
Rockingham	4.40	7.08	Shenandoah County Line	Supin Lick Road Black Jack Road	SR 612 (Rinker Road)	
Russell	11.25	18.11	Scott County Line	Lower Grassy Creek Road Grassy Creek Road Johnson Settlement & Ervintown Roads Ervintown Road Burtons Ford Road	Wise County Line	Gap between segments ending at different points along SR 71 Gap between segments ending at different points along SR 65
Scott	3.90	6.28	SR 71	Unnamed road Lower Grassy Creek Road	Russell County Line	
Shenandoah	12.90	20.76	Rockingham County Line	Supinlick Ridge Lane	SR 717 (Alum Springs Road)	Gap between segments ending at different points along SR 263
Smyth	0.60	0.97	Washington County Line	Unnamed road	Saltville Town Limits	
Southampton	8.80	14.16	US 58 Bus	Rochelle Street Flaggy Run Road Black Creek Road Joyners Bridge Road	Isle of Wight County Line	Gap between segments ending at different points along SR 641 Gap between segments ending at different points along SR 635
Spotsylvania	1.65	2.66	Dead End	Windy Acres Lane	Orange County Line	
Stafford	3.78	6.08	SR 637 (Telegraph Road)	Widewater Road	Dead End	
Surry	8.91	14.34	SR 616 (Golden Hill Road)	Salisbury Road	SR 10 (Colonial Trail)	
Sussex	5.70	9.17	Greensville County Line	Unnamed road	SR 610 (Harrell Road)	
Tazewell	0.90	1.45	SR 602 (Laurel Bed Road/Claytor Road)	Ben Bow Road	SR 604 (Upper Valley Road)	
Warren	6.08	9.78	SR 635 (Bowmans Mill Road)	Long Meadow Road	SR 637 (River Road)	
Washington	30.64	49.31	Dead End	Waylon Drive Spring Creek Road Providence Road Garrett Creek Road North Fork River Road	Smyth County Line	Gap between segments ending at different points along SR 647 Gap between segments ending at different points along SR 645 Gap between segments ending at different points along US 19 Gap between segments ending at different points along SR 692 Gap between segments ending at different points along SR 80
Westmoreland	3.75	6.04	SR 202 (Cople Highway)	Zion Church Road Peckatone Road	Dead End	Gap between segments ending at different points along SR 606
Wise	1.90	3.06	Dead End	Unnamed road	US 58 Alt	
Wythe	1.55	2.49	SR 626 (Carters Ferry Road)	Crockett Crossing	SR 618 (Reed Creek Drive)	
York	0.05	0.08	SR 612 (Maynor Drive)	Maynor Drive	SR 720 (Wilkins Drive)	
