= Virginia State Route 626 =

State highway in Virginia, United States

State Route 626

Route information
- Maintained by VDOT

Location
- Country: United States
- State: Virginia

Highway system
- Virginia Routes; Interstate; US; Primary; Secondary; Byways; History; HOT lanes

State Route 626 (SR 626) in the U.S. state of Virginia is a secondary route designation applied to multiple discontinuous road segments among the many counties. The list below describes the sections in each county that are designated SR 626.

== List ==
| County | Length (mi) | Length (km) | From | Via | To | Notes |
|---|---|---|---|---|---|---|
| Accomack | 5.86 | 9.43 | SR 637 (Mount Nebo Road) | Dingleys Mill Road Airport Drive Main Street Race Track Road | SR 600 (Seaside Road) | Gap between segments ending at different points along SR 718 Gap between segments ending at different points along SR 609 |
| Albemarle | 10.31 | 16.59 | Nelson County Line | James River Road Langhorne Road | SR 20 (Scottsville Road) | Gap between segments ending at different points along SR 627 |
| Alleghany | 0.15 | 0.24 | SR 662 | Portland Avenue | SR 1402 (Athol Street) | |
| Amelia | 0.01 | 0.02 | US 360 Bus (Goodes Bridge Road) | Crossing Road | SR 629 (Elm Cottage Road) | |
| Amherst | 0.60 | 0.97 | SR 130 (Elon Road) | Scotts Mansion Road | SR 130 (Elon Road) | |
| Appomattox | 9.84 | 15.84 | SR 24 (Old Courthouse Road) | Holiday Lake Road | Prince Edward County Line | |
| Augusta | 2.18 | 3.51 | SR 613 (Spring Hill Road) | Berry Farm Road Limestone Road Cider Mill Road Seawright Springs Road | US 11 (Lee Highway) | |
| Bath | 0.40 | 0.64 | SR 629 (Deerfield Road) | Brooks Drive | Dead End | |
| Bedford | 20.27 | 32.62 | Dead End | Smith Mountain Lake Parkway Johnson Mountain Road | Campbell County Line | |
| Bland | 3.65 | 5.87 | SR 622 (Birch Grove Road) | Stowers Hill Road Bethany Road | SR 42 (Blue Grass Highway) | |
| Botetourt | 0.36 | 0.58 | Dead End | Camelia Drive Mimosa Street | SR 779 (Catawba Road) | |
| Brunswick | 11.56 | 18.60 | SR 903 (Hendricks Mill Road) | Robinson Ferry Road Gasburg Road | SR 46 (Christanna Highway) | |
| Buchanan | 2.90 | 4.67 | SR 632 (Page) | Trace Branch | US 460 | |
| Buckingham | 3.67 | 5.91 | Dead End | Locust Grove Road Clay Bank Road | SR 650 (Belle Road) | |
| Campbell | 8.83 | 14.21 | Bedford County Line | Johnson Mountain Road Goodman Crossing Road Lynch Road | Altavista Town Line | Gap between segments ending at different points along SR 682 Gap between segments ending at different points along SR 712 |
| Caroline | 8.29 | 13.34 | SR 633 (Bull Church Road) | Sunshine School Road Woodford Road | SR 2 (Fredericksburg Turnpike) | Gap between segments ending at different points along SR 605 |
| Carroll | 2.90 | 4.67 | Floyd County Line | Childress Road Adams Branch Road | Floyd County Line | Gap between segments ending at different points along SR 627 |
| Charles City | 1.50 | 2.41 | Dead End | Old Elam Cemetery | SR 615 (Glebe Lane) | |
| Charlotte | 1.90 | 3.06 | US 15 (Kings Highway) | Hatchet Road | Dead End | |
| Chesterfield | 12.30 | 19.79 | SR 654 (Bundle Road) | Woodpecker Road Lakeview Drive | Colonial Heights City Limits | Gap between segments ending at different points along SR 627 |
| Clarke | 1.60 | 2.57 | SR 622 (Bordens Spring Road) | Nelson Road | SR 624 (Red Gate Road) | |
| Craig | 1.60 | 2.57 | SR 42 | Unnamed road | SR 624 | |
| Culpeper | 6.71 | 10.80 | SR 640 (Docs Road) | Korea Road Holly Springs Road Black Hill Road | SR 229 (Rixeyville Road) | Gap between segments ending at different points along SR 611 |
| Cumberland | 4.69 | 7.55 | SR 623 (Sugar Fork Road) | Bonbrook Creek Road Meador Road | SR 45 (Cartersville Road) | Gap between segments ending at different points along SR 624 |
| Dickenson | 3.20 | 5.15 | Russell County Line | Phillips Hollow | SR 63 (Dante Mountain Road) | |
| Dinwiddie | 10.19 | 16.40 | SR 40 (McKenney Highway) | Flatfoot Road | SR 619 (Courthouse Road) | |
| Essex | 1.12 | 1.80 | Dead End | Bloomsbury Lane | SR 620 (Cheatwood Mill Road) | |
| Fairfax | 1.75 | 2.82 | US 1 (Richmond Highway) | Sherwood Hall Lane | SR 629 (Fort Hunt Road) | |
| Fauquier | 7.78 | 12.52 | SR 55 (Main Street) | Loudoun Avenue Halfway Road | Loudoun County Line | |
| Floyd | 0.20 | 0.32 | Carroll County Line | Mount Hebron Road | SR 625 (Bolt Mill Road) | |
| Fluvanna | 1.80 | 2.90 | SR 659 (Kents Store Way) | Jordan Store Road | Louisa County Line | |
| Franklin | 2.54 | 4.09 | SR 659 (Ramsey Memorial Road) | Ramsey Memorial Road | SR 40/SR 660 | |
| Frederick | 0.32 | 0.51 | Dead End | Middle Lane | SR 750 (Lucas Lane) | |
| Giles | 5.13 | 8.26 | Cul-de-Sac | Castle Rock Road Mill Street Johnson Road Dry Branch Road Klotz Road | Dead End | Gap between segments ending at different points along US 460 Gap between segments ending at different points along SR 623 Gap between segments ending at different points along SR 635 |
| Gloucester | 3.10 | 4.99 | SR 629 (T C Walker Road) | Zanoni Road Baileys Wharf Road | Dead End | |
| Goochland | 2.85 | 4.59 | SR 654 (Shallow Well Road) | Seay Road | SR 621 (Manakin Road) | |
| Grayson | 9.49 | 15.27 | SR 632 | Little River Road Old Baywood Road | US 58/US 221 | |
| Greene | 5.42 | 8.72 | Shenandoah National Park boundary | Snow Mountain Road | SR 810 (Dyke Road) | |
| Greensville | 2.10 | 3.38 | SR 629 (Zion Church Road) | Unnamed road | SR 622 | |
| Halifax | 20.62 | 33.18 | US 501 (L P Bailey Memorial Highway) | Shiloh Church Road Clarkton Road Howard P Anderson Road Howard P Johnson Highway | SR 360 (Bethel Road) | Gap between segments ending at different points along SR 603 |
| Hanover | 5.52 | 8.88 | Henrico County Line | Old Washington Highway Elmont Road | Ashland Town Line | Gap between segments ending at different points along SR 623 |
| Henry | 1.82 | 2.93 | Patrick County Line | Morning Side Drive | SR 687 (Stones Dairy Road) | Formerly SR 105 |
| Highland | 1.60 | 2.57 | Dead End | Unnamed road | US 220 | |
| Isle of Wight | 8.16 | 13.13 | Surry County Line | Jones Drive Mill Swamp Road | Smithfield Town Limits | Gap between segments ending at different points along SR 621 |
| King and Queen | 0.50 | 0.80 | SR 623 (Indians Neck Road) | Roseville Road | Dead End | |
| King George | 0.50 | 0.80 | Dead End | Green Law Way | SR 627 (Wilmont Road) | |
| King William | 3.68 | 5.92 | SR 633 (Powhatan Trail) | Rose Garden Road | SR 640 (Wakema Road) | |
| Lancaster | 1.21 | 1.95 | Dead End | Towles Point Road | SR 354 (River Road) | |
| Lee | 1.70 | 2.74 | Dead End | Delvale Road | SR 919 (Hoover Hill Road) | |
| Loudoun | 13.02 | 20.95 | Fauquier County Line | The Plains Road Foxcroft Road Bloomfield Road Foggy Bottom Road | SR 734 (Snickersville Turnpike) | Gap between segments ending at different points along SR 630 Gap between segments ending at different points along SR 719 |
| Louisa | 4.20 | 6.76 | Fluvanna County Line | Mallory Road Evergreen Road | SR 640 (Jack Jouett Road) | |
| Lunenburg | 15.26 | 24.56 | SR 40 (Lunenburg County Road) | Double Bridges Road Kings Road Rubermont Road | Nottoway County Line | Gap between segments ending at different points along SR 662 Gap between segments ending at different points along SR 723 |
| Madison | 2.72 | 4.38 | US 29/SR 230 (Seminole Trail) | Gibbs Road Oneals Road | SR 616 (Carpenters Mill Road)/SR 634 (Oak Park Road) | Gap between SR 231 and SR 230 |
| Mathews | 5.80 | 9.33 | SR 14 (John Clayton Memorial Highway) | Ridge Road Hallieford Road | Dead End | Gap between segments ending at different points along SR 198 |
| Mecklenburg | 9.44 | 15.19 | SR 903 | Blackridge Road Regional Airport Road | US 58 | Gap between segments ending at different points along SR 624 |
| Middlesex | 2.83 | 4.55 | SR 3 (General Puller Highway) | Regent Road Wake Road Carlton Road | Dead End | Gap between segments ending at different points along SR 625 |
| Montgomery | 1.25 | 2.01 | Dead End | Gardner Street Lafayette Road | US 11/US 460 | |
| Nelson | 21.46 | 34.54 | US 60 | Norwood Road Union Hill Drive James River Road | Albemarle County Line | |
| New Kent | 1.00 | 1.61 | SR 249 (New Kent Highway) | Paige Road | SR 249 (New Kent Highway) | |
| Northampton | 0.05 | 0.08 | SR 627 (Machipongo Drive) | Machipongo Drive | US 13 (Lankford Highway) | |
| Northumberland | 1.20 | 1.93 | US 360 (Northumberland Highway) | Glebe Road | Dead End | |
| Nottoway | 9.99 | 16.08 | Lunenburg County Line | Hungarytown Road | Blackstone Town Limits | |
| Orange | 3.90 | 6.28 | SR 627 (Clarks Mountain Road) | Bushy Mountain Road | SR 636 (River Road) | |
| Page | 2.90 | 4.67 | Dead End | Alshire Hollow Road Hawksbill Park Road | SR 689 (Marksville Road) | |
| Patrick | 10.16 | 16.35 | US 58 (Jeb Stuart Highway) | Abram Penn Highway | SR 627 (County Line Road) | Formerly SR 105 |
| Pittsylvania | 15.08 | 24.27 | SR 969 (Sago Road) | Museville Road Smith Mountain Road | Dead End | Gap between segments ending at different points along SR 40 |
| Powhatan | 0.80 | 1.29 | US 60 (James Anderson Highway) | Brauer Road | Dead End | |
| Prince Edward | 9.79 | 15.76 | SR 658 (Five Forks Road) | Pin Oak Road Prospect Road Peaks Road Holiday Lake Road | Appomattox County Line | |
| Prince George | 6.28 | 10.11 | SR 627 (Pumphouse Road) | Thweatt Road Tavern Road | US 301 (Crater Road) | Gap between segments ending at different points along SR 156 |
| Prince William | 0.49 | 0.79 | SR 631 (Kahns Road) | Harvey Road | Dead End | |
| Pulaski | 4.09 | 6.58 | SR 611 (Wilderness Road) | Hazel Hollow Road | US 11 (Lee Highway) | |
| Rappahannock | 13.09 | 21.07 | End State Maintenance | Piedmont Avenue Porter Street Mount Salem Avenue Tiger Valley Road Long Mountain Road Whorton Hollow Road Scrabble Road | US 522 (Zachary Taylor Avenue) | Gap between segments ending at different points along US 211 Bus/US 522 Bus Gap between segments ending at different points along SR 622 |
| Richmond | 0.31 | 0.50 | SR 3 (Historyland Highway) | Arnold Lane | SR 614 (Boswell Road) | |
| Roanoke | 1.05 | 1.69 | SR 117 (Peters Creek Road) | Thirlane Road | Dead End | |
| Rockbridge | 2.40 | 3.86 | SR 622 | Hackers Road | Dead End | |
| Rockingham | 2.00 | 3.22 | SR 628 (Beldor Road) | Sandy Bottom Road | Shenandoah National Park boundary | |
| Russell | 1.40 | 2.25 | SR 627 (Saw Mill Hollow) | Phillips Hollow | Dickenson County Line | |
| Scott | 4.90 | 7.89 | SR 625 | Unnamed road | SR 625 | |
| Shenandoah | 0.21 | 0.34 | Dead End | Boling Springs Road | SR 767 (Quicksburg Road) | |
| Smyth | 0.40 | 0.64 | US 11 (Lee Highway) | Ole Hickory Avenue | Dead End | |
| Southampton | 12.60 | 20.28 | SR 628 (Wakefield Road) | Berlin Dory Road Appleton Road Womble Mill Road Black Creek Road | SR 635 (Black Creek Road) | Gap between segments ending at different points along SR 616 Gap between segments ending at different points along SR 603 |
| Spotsylvania | 0.41 | 0.66 | SR 610 (Old Plank Road) | Andora Drive | SR 3 (Plank Road) | |
| Stafford | 4.42 | 7.11 | SR 607 (Deacon Road) | Leeland Road Potomac Run Road | SR 628 (Eskimo Hill Road) | |
| Surry | 18.89 | 30.40 | Isle of Wight County Line | Bellevue Road Beachland Road Lebanon Road Holybush Road | SR 646 (Spring Grove Avenue) | Gap between segments ending at different points along SR 10 Gap between segments ending at different points along SR 618 |
| Sussex | 16.34 | 26.30 | SR 40 (Sussex Drive) | Courthouse Road Beef Steak Road | SR 602 (Cabin Point Road) | Gap between segments ending at different points along SR 35 |
| Tazewell | 8.49 | 13.66 | SR 631 (Indian Creek Road) | Ravens Nest Branch Road | SR 637 (Dry Fork Road) | Gap between segments ending at different points along SR 627 |
| Warren | 5.90 | 9.50 | SR 619 (Mountain Road) | Steed Lane Totten Lane Unnamed road | SR 637 (River ROad | Gap between segments ending at different points along SR 615 Gap between segments ending at different points along SR 55 Gap between dead ends |
| Washington | 4.40 | 7.08 | SR 700 (Rich Valley Road) | Large Hollow Road | SR 614 (Smith Creek Road) | |
| Westmoreland | 8.96 | 14.42 | SR 612 (Nomini Hall Road) | Beales Mill Road Erica Road Mount Holly Road Herring Lane King Copsico Lane | SR 626 (End Loop) | Gap between segments ending at different points along SR 202 |
| Wise | 4.52 | 7.27 | SR 620 (Guest River Road) | Unnamed road | SR 823 (Indian Creek Road) | |
| Wythe | 2.40 | 3.86 | SR 619 (Major Grahams Road) | Carters Ferry Road | SR 622 (Lone Ash Road) | |
| York | 0.41 | 0.66 | SR 718 (Back Creek Road) | Shirley Road | Dead End | |
