= Virginia State Route 613 =

State highway in Virginia, United States

State Route 613

Route information
- Maintained by VDOT

Location
- Country: United States
- State: Virginia

Highway system
- Virginia Routes; Interstate; US; Primary; Secondary; Byways; History; HOT lanes

State Route 613 (SR 613) in the U.S. state of Virginia is a secondary route designation applied to multiple discontinuous road segments among the many counties. The list below describes the sections in each county that are designated SR 613.

== List ==
County	Length (mi)	Length (km)	From	Via	To	Notes
Accomack	4.80	7.72	SR 612 (Scarbouroughs Neck Road)	Indian Trail Road	SR 335 (Eastern Shore Agriculture Experiment Station)	
Albemarle	0.20	0.32	SR 602 (Howardsville Turnpike)	Giannini Lane	Dead End	
Alleghany	7.42	11.94	Dead End	Unnamed road	SR 600	Gap between segments ending at different points along SR 18
Amelia	0.04	0.06	SR 615 (Namozine Road)	Dennisville Road	SR 614 (Dennisville Road)	
Amherst	2.90	4.67	SR 648 (Beck Creek Road)	Kentmoor Farm Road	SR 663 (Brightwells Mill Road)	
Appomattox	6.85	11.02	SR 608 (Stonewall Road)	Spring Grove Road/Buck Creek Road Police Tower Road	US 460 (Richmond Highway)	
Augusta	25.72	41.39	SR 662 (Stover School Road)	Old Greenville Road Spring Hill Road Kyles Mill Road Bridgewater Road	Rockingham County Line	Gap between segments ending at different points along SR 872 Gap between segments ending at different points along the Staunton City Limits Gap between segments ending at different points along SR 747
Bath	0.55	0.89	SR 612 (Ashwood Drive)	Forestry Road	US 220 (Ingalls Boulevard)	
Bedford	5.59	9.00	SR 637 (Penns Mill Road)	Waugh Switch Road	US 501 (Lee Jackson Highway)	
Bland	12.54	20.18	Dead End	Dry Fork Road Laurel Fork Road Dry Fork Road	Dead End	
Botetourt	1.35	2.17	SR 615 (Craig Creek Road)	Sleepy Ford Road	Dead End	
Brunswick	1.70	2.74	SR 616 (Lew Jones Road)	Gills Bridge Road	Dinwiddie County Line	
Buchanan	6.80	10.94	SR 636	Unnamed road	SR 616	
Buckingham	5.30	8.53	SR 622 (Trents Mill Road)	Petersville Church Road	Cumberland County Line	
Campbell	1.15	1.85	Dead End	Jennings Road	SR 633 (Epsons Road)	
Caroline	1.15	1.85	US 1 (Jefferson Davis Highway)	Zion Road	US 1 (Jefferson Davis Highway)	
Carroll	2.00	3.22	SR 619 (Phillips Road/Greasy Creek Road)	Greasy Creek Road	Floyd County Line	
Charles City	6.91	11.12	Dead End	Shady Point Road	SR 5 (John Tyler Memorial Highway)	
Charlotte	9.40	15.13	SR 612 (Herman Road)	Country Road Alegra Road	SR 623 (West Point Stephens Road)	Gap between segments ending at different points along SR 47
Chesterfield	1.76	2.83	SR 1625 (Perrymont Road)	Willis Road	Dead End	
Clarke	3.51	5.65	SR 621 (Briggs Road)	Lockes Mill Road Springsbury Road	SR 700 (Jack Enders Boulevard)	Gap between segments ending at different points along SR 618
Craig	0.62	1.00	SR 612 (Angus Lane/Pike Lane)	Scenic View Lane	Dead End	
Culpeper	3.92	6.31	US 211 (Lee Highway)	Waterloo Road	Fauquier County Line	Gap between segments ending at different points along the Rappahannock County Line
Cumberland	3.05	4.91	Buckingham County Line	Petersville Road Sports Lake Road	SR 608 (Sports Lake Road/Sugarfork Road)	
Dickenson	1.57	2.53	SR 63	Splashdam Road Unnamed road	Dead End	
Dinwiddie	34.74	55.91	Brunswick County Line	Gills Bridge Road White Oak Road Dabney Mill Road Squirrel Level Road	Petersburg City Limits	Gap between segments ending at different points along SR 40 Gap between segments ending at different points along US 1
Essex	0.59	0.95	SR 656 (South Hill Banks Drive)	River Oaks Road	Dead End	
Fairfax	10.81	17.40	SR 611 (Telegraph Road)	Beulah Street Van Dorn Street Lincolnia Road Sleepy Hollow Road Wilson Boulevard	Arlington County Line	Gap between SR 644 and SR 611 Gap between SR 401 and SR 2532 Gap between segments ending at different points along SR 244
Fauquier	0.10	0.16	Culpeper County Line	Jeffesonton Road	SR 688 (Leeds Manor Road)	
Floyd	2.00	3.22	Carroll County Line	Berry Creek Road	SR 611 (Macks Mountain Road)	
Fluvanna	5.80	9.33	US 15 (James Madison Highway)	Bybees Church Road	SR 607 (Bybee Road)	
Franklin	4.95	7.97	Roanoke County Line	Naff Road	US 220 (Franklin Road/Virgil H Goode Highway)	
Frederick	0.10	0.16	Dead End	Bowman Lane	SR 600 (Back Mountain Road)	
Giles	15.63	25.15	US 460 (Virginia Avenue)	Doe Creek Road Mountain Lake Road North Fork Mountain Road	Dead End	Gap between segments ending at different points along SR 635
Gloucester	4.35	7.00	Dead End	Plantation Road Enos Road	US 17 (George Washington Memorial Highway)	
Goochland	3.81	6.13	SR 615 (Chapel Hill Road)	Riddles Bridge Road	SR 614 (Dogtown Road)	
Grayson	5.11	8.22	SR 615/North Carolina State Line	Edmonds Road Snowhill Road	SR 609 (Peaks Mountain Road)	Gap between segments ending at different points along SR 785
Greene	0.01	0.02	SR 667 (Middle River Road)	Willy Miser Lane	Madison County Line	
Greensville	4.90	7.89	SR 605	Whitehouse Road Unnamed road	SR 610 (Slagles Lake Road)	Gap between segments ending at different points along SR 619
Halifax	8.41	13.53	SR 626 (Howard P Johnson Highway)	Marions Trail Wagstaff Lane Terrys Bridge Road	SR 344 (Scottsburg Road)	Gap between segments ending at different points along SR 360
Hanover	1.30	2.09	SR 630 (Market Lane)	Fox Hunter Lane	New Kent County Line	
Henry	0.80	1.29	SR 647 (Mountain Valley Road)	Wilhaven Lane	Dead End	
Highland	1.10	1.77	SR 614	Unnamed road	Dead End	
Isle of Wight	0.80	1.29	Suffolk City Limits	See-Gar Drive	US 58 Bus (Carrsville Highway)	
James City	5.55	8.93	SR 5 (John Tyler Memorial Highway)	Brick Bat Road News Road	SR 615 (Ironbound Road)/SR 783	
King and Queen	5.20	8.37	Dead End	Allens Mill Pond Road Dabney Road	SR 610 (Piedmont Road/Coldwater Road)	Gap between segments ending at different points along SR 614
King George	0.85	1.37	SR 218 (Windsor Drive)	Little Ferry Road	Dead End	
King William	2.18	3.51	SR 618 (Acquinton Church Road)	Dunluce Road	SR 30 (King William Road)	
Lancaster	2.07	3.33	Cul-de-Sac	Iberis Road	SR 604 (Merry Point Road)	
Lee	1.04	1.67	SR 758 (Flannery Ridge Road)	Unnamed road	SR 612 (Lower Waldens Creek Road)	
Loudoun	1.80	2.90	SR 659 (Gum Springs Road)	Ticonderoga Road	SR 620 (Braddock Road)	
Louisa	22.88	36.82	US 250 (Three Notch Road)	Poindexter Road Oakland Road Goldmine Road Mansfield Road	US 522	Gap between segments ending at different points along US 33
Lunenburg	7.70	12.39	SR 635 (Oral Oaks Road)	Brickland Road	SR 138 (Hill Road)	
Madison	3.25	5.23	Greene County Line	Kinderhook Road	SR 230 (Wolftown-Hood Road)	
Mathews	4.50	7.24	SR 14 (John Clayton Memorial Highway)	Beaver Dam Road Knights Woods Road	SR 643 (Haven Beach Road)	Gap between segments ending at different points along SR 611
Mecklenburg	0.35	0.56	SR 49	Stockman Road	Dead End	
Middlesex	0.40	0.64	SR 603 (Farley Park Road)	Moss Swamp Road	US 17 (Tidewater Trail)	
Montgomery	2.44	3.93	Dead End	Mountain Pride Blue Spring Road Graysontown Road	Pulaski County Line	Gap between segments ending at different points along SR 693
Nelson	7.14	11.49	SR 776 (Grape Lawn Lane)	Rocky Road Berry Hill Road Bottoms Lane Lodebar Estates Rodes Farm Road	Dead End	Gap between segments ending at different points along SR 634 Gap between segments ending at different points along SR 151
New Kent	3.74	6.02	Hanover County Line	Dispatch Road	SR 249 (New Kent Highway)	
Northampton	2.50	4.02	Dead End	Silver Road Unnamed road Occohannock Neck Road	SR 183 (Occohannock Neck Road)	Gap between segments ending at different points along SR 677
Northumberland	0.60	0.97	SR 612 (Forrest Landing Road)	Mill Wood Lane	Dead End	
Nottoway	4.88	7.85	SR 615 (Namozine Road)	Turkey Island Road	SR 614 (Cellar Creek Road)	
Orange	0.40	0.64	Dead End	Willy Miser Lane	SR 670 (Ridgeway Drive)	
Page	3.30	5.31	US 340	Strole Farm Road	US 340	
Patrick	8.62	13.87	Dead End	North Fork Road Lone Ivy Road	SR 618 (Elamsville Road)	Gap between segments ending at different points along SR 8
Pittsylvania	0.55	0.89	Dead End	Newby Lane	SR 703 (Irish Road)	
Powhatan	3.33	5.36	US 60	Judes Ferry Road	SR 614 (Mill Road)	
Prince Edward	9.18	14.77	US 360	Indian Spring Road Miller Lake Road	SR 605 (Fairlea Road/Lakeview Road)	Gap between segments ending at different points along SR 612
Prince George	3.30	5.31	Sussex County Line	Webb Road	SR 625 (Hines Road)	
Prince William	0.23	0.37	SR 619 (Fuller Heights Road)	Mockingbird Heights Road	Dead End	
Pulaski	2.81	4.52	SR 693 (Lead Mine Road)	Cherry Branch Road	Montgomery County Line	
Rappahannock	0.14	0.23	Culpeper County Line	Unnamed road	Culpeper County Line	
Richmond	3.30	5.31	SR 608 (Farnham Creek Road)	Calvary Church Road	SR 3 (History Land Highway)	
Roanoke	4.64	7.47	Franklin County Line	Merriman Road	SR 687 (Colonial Avenue)	
Rockbridge	4.63	7.45	SR 710 (Sterrett Road)	Ridge Road	SR 606 (Raphine Road)	
Rockingham	30.03	48.33	Augusta County Line	Jordan Hill Road Spring Creek Road Clover Hill Road Whitmore Shop Road Singers Glen Road Turleytown Road North Mountain Road	Shenandoah County Line	Gap between segments ending at different points along SR 257 Gap between segments ending at different points along SR 259
Russell	11.67	18.78	Scott County Line	Moccasin Valley Road	US 58 Alt	Formerly SR 74
Scott	9.42	15.16	SR 71 (Nicklesville Highway)	Big Moccasin Road	Russell County Line	Formerly SR 74
Shenandoah	2.95	4.75	Rockingham County Line	North Mountain Road	SR 42 (Senedo Road)	
Smyth	4.70	7.56	Washington County Line	Poor Valley Road Allisons Gap Road	SR 633 (Possum Hollow Road)	
Spotsylvania	11.90	19.15	SR 208 (Courthouse Road)	Brock Road	SR 3 (Plank Road)	Formerly SR 210
Stafford	0.37	0.60	Cul-de-Sac	Chapel Heights Drive	SR 602 (Chapel Green Road)	
Surry	6.08	9.78	SR 10 (Colonial Trail)	Cabin Point Road Spring Grove Road Mancha Avenue	SR 1202 (Villa Road)	
Sussex	11.62	18.70	Prince George County Line	Unnamed road Petersburg Road Unnamed road	SR 603	Gap between segments ending at different points along SR 606
Warren	12.81	20.62	SR 631/SR 649 (Browntown Road)	Bentonville Browntown Road Indian Hollow Road Unnamed road	SR 619 (Mountain Road)	Gap between segments ending at different points along US 340
Washington	6.97	11.22	SR 80 (Haylers Gap Road)	Poor Valley Road	Smyth County Line	
Westmoreland	0.44	0.71	SR 3 (History Land Highway)	Beulah Lane	SR 612 (Antioch Road)	
Wise	3.61	5.81	Big Stone Gap Town Limits	East Stone Gap Road Unnamed road	SR 602	Gap between SR 609 and SR 698 Gap between segments ending at different points along SR 612
Wythe	5.60	9.01	FR-44 (Lee Highway)	Unnamed road Gunton Park Road	Dead End	
York	0.80	1.29	US 17 (George Washington Memorial Highway)	Darby Road	Dead End	
