= Virginia State Route 773 =

Secondary route designation

State Route 773

Route information
- Maintained by VDOT

Location
- Country: United States
- State: Virginia

Highway system
- Virginia Routes; Interstate; US; Primary; Secondary; Byways; History; HOT lanes

State Route 773 (SR 773) in the U.S. state of Virginia is a secondary route designation applied to multiple discontinuous road segments among the many counties. The list below describes the sections in each county that are designated SR 773.

== List ==
County	Length (mi)	Length (km)	From	Via	To	Notes
Accomack	0.40	0.64	SR 606 (Harbor Point Road)	Water Street Mapp Street	SR 605 (Upshur Neck Road)	
Albemarle	0.65	1.05	SR 622 (Albevanna Spring Lane)	Pat Dennis Road	Fluvanna County line	
Amherst	0.30	0.48	Dead End	Martins Lane	SR 163 (Amherst Highway)	
Augusta	5.13	8.26	SR 775 (Buttermilk Road)	Westview School Road VA Mill Road Cave View Lane	SR 996 (Chapel Hill Lane)	Gap between segments ending at different points along SR 847
Bedford	0.30	0.48	SR 609 (Rustic Village Road)	Two Church Lane	US 221 (Forest Road)	
Botetourt	0.14	0.23	Dead End	Lacey Lane	SR 658 (Laymantown Road)	
Carroll	0.90	1.45	SR 742 (McGhee Road)	Jericho Road	SR 743 (Pleasant View Road)	
Chesterfield	0.48	0.77	SR 654 (Spring Run Road)	Pasture Hill Road	SR 1292 (Singer Road)	
Fairfax	0.31	0.50	SR 943 (Knollwood Drive)	Charles Street	SR 7 (Leesburg Pike)	
Fauquier	0.09	0.14	SR 626 (Halfway Road)	Turner Mountain Road	Dead End	
Franklin	0.58	0.93	Dead End	Salthouse Branch Road	SR 798 (Knob Church Road)	
Halifax	1.17	1.88	SR 658 (Turbeville Road)	Jeffress Trail	Dead End	
Hanover	0.10	0.16	SR 722 (Landmark Cedar Road)	George Ruth Road	Dead End	
Henry	0.50	0.80	SR 57 (Chatham Road)	Rolling Hills Drive Plaster Road	US 58	
James City	0.04	0.06	SR 769 (Barlows Run Road)	South Cove Court	Cul-de-Sac	
Loudoun	2.44	3.93	Leesburg town limits	River Creek Parkway Edwards Ferry Road	Leesburg town limits	
Louisa	0.33	0.53	SR 693 (Kents Mill Road)	Jacoby Road	Dead End	
Mecklenburg	0.60	0.97	SR 903 (Goodes Ferry Road)	Tobacco Lane	Dead End	
Montgomery	0.06	0.10	SR 626 (Lafayette Road)	Cannery Road	Dead End	
Pittsylvania	2.90	4.67	SR 799 (Climax Road)	Wade Road	SR 794 (Homestead Road)	
Prince William	0.15	0.24	SR 28 (Nokesville Road)	Minute Lane	SR 652 (Fitzwater Drive)	
Pulaski	0.70	1.13	SR 607	Betty Baker Road	Dead End	
Roanoke	0.82	1.32	SR 740 (Carvins Cove Road)	Shawnee Trail Apache Road	SR 740 (Carvins Cove Road)	
Rockbridge	1.14	1.83	SR 130 (Wert Faulkner Highway)	Lloyd Tolley Road	Dead End	
Rockingham	2.70	4.35	SR 771 (Chrisman Road/Polecat Hollow Road)	Chrisman Road Mayberry Road	SR 776 (Frank Lane Road)	Gap between segments ending at different points along SR 772
Scott	0.70	1.13	Dead End	Unnamed road	SR 643	
Shenandoah	1.00	1.61	SR 774 (Veach Gap Road)	Coverstone Road	SR 771 (Boyer Road)	
Tazewell	0.23	0.37	Dead End	Bailey Road	SR 631 (Baptist Valley Road)	
Washington	0.21	0.34	SR 91	Bennington Way	Dead End	
Wise	0.36	0.58	Dead End	Unnamed road	SR 671 (North Fork Road)	
York	0.10	0.16	Dead End	Old Dare Road	SR 621 (Dare Road)	
