= Virginia State Route 775 =

Secondary route designation

State Route 775

Route information
- Maintained by VDOT

Location
- Country: United States
- State: Virginia

Highway system
- Virginia Routes; Interstate; US; Primary; Secondary; Byways; History; HOT lanes

State Route 775 (SR 775) in the U.S. state of Virginia is a secondary route designation applied to multiple discontinuous road segments among the many counties. The list below describes the sections in each county that are designated SR 775.

== List ==
County	Length (mi)	Length (km)	From	Via	To	Notes
Accomack	0.50	0.80	Dead End	Sherwood Drive	US 13 (Lankford Highway)	
Albemarle	0.06	0.10	US 29 (Monacan Trail)	Robert Valley Lane	SR 767 (Robert Valley Road)	
Amherst	0.80	1.29	Dead End	Potts Lane	SR 747 (Rising Sun Circle)	
Augusta	6.73	10.83	US 11 (Lee Highway)	Buttermilk Road Craig Shop Road Middle Lane Road	SR 865 (Rockfish Road)	Gap between segments ending at different points along SR 608
Bedford	1.50	2.41	SR 699 (Bore Auger Road)	Ivy Branch Drive	Dead End	
Botetourt	0.45	0.72	US 220 Alt (Cloverdale Road)	Spring Hollow Road	Dead End	
Campbell	1.25	2.01	Dead End	Ruckers Road	SR 657 (Booth Road)	
Carroll	6.72	10.81	SR 97 (Pipers Gap Road)	Chances Creek Road	I-77	Gap between segments ending at different points along SR 701
Chesterfield	0.57	0.92	US 360 (Hull Street Road)	Clintwood Road	SR 604/SR 2601	
Dinwiddie	0.92	1.48	SR 672 (Church Road)	Hofheimer Way	US 1 (Boydton Plank Road)	
Fauquier	0.07	0.11	SR 610 (3rd Street)	Chestnut Street	Dead End	
Franklin	4.02	6.47	SR 919 (Grassy Hill Road)	Iron Ridge Road	SR 697 (Wirtz Road)	
Frederick	0.60	0.97	SR 645 (Airport Road)	Admiral Byrd Drive	SR 645 (Airport Road)	
Halifax	1.39	2.24	US 501 (Huell Matthews Highway)	Newton Farm Road	SR 658 (Cherry Hill Church Road)	
Hanover	0.30	0.48	SR 657 (Greenwood Church Road)	Lone Oak Road	Dead End	
Henry	2.02	3.25	SR 964 (Friendship Drive)	Flanigan Branch Road	SR 881 (Graceland Drive)	
James City	0.13	0.21	Cul-de-Sac	Friendship Drive	SR 631 (Chickahominy Road)	
Loudoun	1.97	3.17	SR 606 (Old Ox Road)	Cedar Green Road	SR 625 (Church Road)	Gap between a dead end and SR 28
Louisa	0.70	1.13	Dead End	Rising Sun Lane	SR 618 (Fredericks Halls Road)	
Mecklenburg	1.01	1.63	US 58	Camp Road	SR 645 (Gordon Lake Road)	
Montgomery	0.21	0.34	Dead End	Davis Street	US 460	
Pittsylvania	1.60	2.57	SR 751 (Grassland Drive)	Star Land Drive	Dead End	Gap between segments ending at different points along SR 40
Prince William	0.18	0.29	Dead End	Skylark Drive	SR 772 (Marsteller Road)	
Pulaski	0.07	0.11	SR 645 (Morehead Lane Road)	Montgomery Avenue	SR 774 (Second Morehead Lane)	
Roanoke	0.30	0.48	Dead End	Ivyland Road	SR 658 (Rutrough Road)	
Rockbridge	0.18	0.29	SR 774 (Beth Horon Drive)	Highland Way Lane	SR 773 (Lloyd Tolley Road)	
Rockingham	0.24	0.39	SR 257 (Ottobine Road)	Judge Paul Road	SR 257 (Ottobine Road)	
Scott	0.80	1.29	SR 654	Unnamed road	SR 653 (Mabe Stanleytown Road)	
Shenandoah	0.35	0.56	SR 769 (Saint Davids Church Road)	Old Store Road	SR 678 (Fort Valley Road)	
Spotsylvania	0.06	0.10	SR 639 (Salem Church Road)	General Semmes Road	SR 776 (Old Salem Church Road)	
Stafford	0.15	0.24	SR 778 (Maple Leave Court)	Cherry Blossom Lane	SR 721 (Old Concord Road)	
Tazewell	0.18	0.29	SR 629 (Daw Road)	York Road	Dead End	
Washington	0.30	0.48	US 19 (Porterfield Highway)	Brinkley Road	Dead End	
Wise	0.31	0.50	Dead End	Russell Creek Road	SR 655	
York	0.09	0.14	SR 627 (Landing Road)	Hansford Court	Cul-de-Sac	
