= Virginia State Route 782 =

Secondary route designation

State Route 782

Route information
- Maintained by VDOT

Location
- Country: United States
- State: Virginia

Highway system
- Virginia Routes; Interstate; US; Primary; Secondary; Byways; History; HOT lanes

State Route 782 (SR 782) in the U.S. state of Virginia is a secondary route designation applied to multiple discontinuous road segments among the many counties. The list below describes the sections in each county that are designated SR 782.

== List ==
County	Length (mi)	Length (km)	From	Via	To	Notes
Accomack	1.00	1.61	Dead End	Crystal Beach Road	SR 655 (Plantation Road)	
Albemarle	0.73	1.17	Charlottesville city limits	Stribling Avenue Extension	Charlottesville city limits	Gap between US 29 Bus and a dead end
Amherst	0.29	0.47	Dead End	Fairfax Circle	SR 675 (Winesap Road)	
Augusta	7.70	12.39	SR 254 (Hermitage Road)	Brower Road North Point School Road Barnhart Road Morton Road	SR 778 (Patterson Mill Road)	Gap between segments ending at different points along SR 619 Gap between segments ending at different points along SR 785 Gap between segments ending at different points along SR 616
Bedford	0.20	0.32	SR 122 (Big Island Highway)	Waughs Ferry Road	Dead End	
Botetourt	0.10	0.16	SR 658 (Laymantown Road)	Springview Court	Dead End	
Campbell	0.23	0.37	SR 859 (Powtan Road)	Terrace Hill Drive	SR 769 (Beechwood Drive)	
Carroll	1.60	2.57	US 52 (Poplar Camp Road)	Round Knob Road	Dead End	
Chesterfield	0.09	0.14	SR 678 (Buford Road)	Vietor Street	SR 1732 (Logan Street)	
Fairfax	0.95	1.53	SR 644 (Franconia Road)	Westchester Street	SR 2078/SR 2079	
Fauquier	0.54	0.87	Dead End	Old Grassdale Road	SR 655 (Lucky Hill Road)	
Franklin	0.36	0.58	SR 890 (Snow Creek Road)	Ashworth Road	Pittsylvania County line	
Frederick	0.11	0.18	Cul-de-Sac	Stanley Circle	SR 780 (Stanley Drive)	
Halifax	2.25	3.62	SR 344 (McDonald Road)	Unnamed road	Dead End	
Hanover	3.59	5.78	SR 835 (King Acres Drive)	Lakeridge Parkway	Dead End	
Henry	2.62	4.22	SR 902 (Mica Road)	Old Sand Road	US 220 Bus/FR 836	
Loudoun	1.80	2.90	SR 762 (Lickey Mill Road)	Tranquility Road	SR 7 Bus (Main Street)	
Louisa	0.35	0.56	Dead End	Woodland Drive	SR 607 (Rock Quarry Road)	
Mecklenburg	0.70	1.13	SR 660 (Old Cox Road)	Trailer Park Road	Dead End	
Montgomery	0.60	0.97	SR 757 (Yates Road)	Hurst Road	Dead End	
Pittsylvania	2.46	3.96	Franklin County line	Fruitridge Drive	SR 626 (Museville Road)	
Prince William	0.62	1.00	Dead End	Residency Road	SR 28 (Nokesville Road)	
Pulaski	0.40	0.64	Dead End	Pikes Place	SR 710 (Mount Olivet Road)	
Roanoke	0.06	0.10	Cul-de-Sac	Drake Circle	SR 1858 (Buckland Mill Road)	
Rockbridge	1.60	2.57	SR 759 (Arnolds Valley Road)	James River Road	Dead End	
Rockingham	3.01	4.84	SR 785 (Shultztown Road)	Williamsburg Road	SR 42 (Harpine Highway)	
Scott	0.24	0.39	Dead End	Walnut Street	SR 767 (Woodland Street)	
Shenandoah	0.06	0.10	Dead End	Old Factory Road	SR 767 (Quicksburg Road)	
Tazewell	0.40	0.64	SR 102	Post Road	SR 643 (Brushfork Road)	
Washington	0.60	0.97	Dead End	Shaffertown Road	US 58 (Gate City Highway)	
Wise	1.00	1.61	SR 639 (Crabtree Road)	Unnamed road	Dead End	
York	1.79	2.88	Poquoson city limits	Carys Chapel Road East Yorktown Road	Poquoson city limits	
