= Virginia State Route 784 =

Secondary route designation

State Route 784

Route information
- Maintained by VDOT

Location
- Country: United States
- State: Virginia

Highway system
- Virginia Routes; Interstate; US; Primary; Secondary; Byways; History; HOT lanes

State Route 784 (SR 784) in the U.S. state of Virginia is a secondary route designation applied to multiple discontinuous road segments among the many counties. The list below describes the sections in each county that are designated SR 784.

== List ==
County	Length (mi)	Length (km)	From	Via	To	Notes
Accomack	0.10	0.16	SR 2601 (Junior Street)	Middle Street	SR 180 (Harborton Road/Shore Drive)	
Albemarle	3.20	5.15	Dead End	Burnt Mill Road Doctors Crossing Road	SR 640 (Gilbert Station Road)	Gap between segments ending at different points along SR 600
Amherst	1.00	1.61	SR 151 (Patrick Henry Highway)	Canodys Store Road	SR 151 (Patrick Henry Highway)	
Augusta	2.30	3.70	SR 785 (Madrid Road)	Pine Bluff Road Round Hill Road	SR 617 (Round Hill School Road)	
Bedford	4.50	7.24	SR 714 (Falling Creek Road)	Nicopolis Road Triggs Road	US 460 (Lynchburg Salem Turnpike)	Gap between segments ending at different points along SR 715
Botetourt	0.15	0.24	Dead End	Swartz Road	SR 640 (Lithia Road)	
Campbell	0.42	0.68	SR 683 (Lawyers Road)	Winebarger Circle	SR 683 (Lawyers Road)	
Carroll	0.30	0.48	SR 100 (Sylvatus Highway)	Rock Creek Road Baker Mines Road	Dead End	
Chesterfield	0.85	1.37	Dead End	Bailey Farm Road	SR 604 (Genito Road)	
Fairfax	0.94	1.51	SR 655 (Blake Lane)	Hibbard Street	Dead End	
Fauquier	0.15	0.24	SR 626 (Loudoun Avenue)	Lee Street	The Plains town limits	
Franklin	1.04	1.67	SR 623 (Ingramville Road)	Pernello Road	SR 781 (King Richard Road)	
Frederick	0.10	0.16	Winchester city limits	Smithfield Avenue	SR 783 (Brick Kiln Avenue)	
Halifax	1.70	2.74	SR 626 (Clarkton Road)	Mason Trail	Dead End	
Hanover	0.30	0.48	Dead End	Talley Pond Road	SR 799 (Woodlawn Drive)	
Henry	0.30	0.48	Dead End	Harmon Hill Road	SR 667 (Koehler Road)	
James City	0.11	0.18	Cul-de-Sac	Iron Bound Road	SR 615 (Ironbound Road)	
Loudoun	0.40	0.64	SR 727 (Forest Mills Road)	Ward Hill Road	SR 725 (Hughesville Road)	
Louisa	0.53	0.85	SR 687 (Daniel Road)	Bailey Drive	Cul-de-Sac	
Mecklenburg	1.09	1.75	SR 722 (Burlington Drive)	Iron Gate Road	FR-1069	
Montgomery	0.42	0.68	Dead End	Fallam Road	SR 625 (Big Falls Road)	
Pittsylvania	0.40	0.64	Dead End	Gunn Lane	SR 713 (Birch Creek Road)	
Prince William	7.97	12.83	SR 642 (Hoadley Road)	Dale Boulevard	US 1 (Jefferson Davis Highway)/SR 1392 (Rippon Boulevard)	
Pulaski	0.37	0.60	SR 611 (Newbern Road)	Hance Road	Dead End	
Roanoke	0.06	0.10	SR 797 (Barrens Road)	Sudley Road	SR 1858 (Buckland Mill Road)	
Rockbridge	0.30	0.48	SR 1111 (Virginia Street)	Tenth Street	SR 1107 (McCulloch Street)	
Rockingham	2.98	4.80	SR 752 (Cherry Grove Road)	Tide Spring Road Klines Mill Road	SR 42 (Harpine Highway)	Gap between segments ending at different points along SR 617
Scott	0.06	0.10	US 23	Virginia Avenue	SR 798 (Highland Street)	
Shenandoah	0.29	0.47	Dead End	South Grove Avenue	SR 675/SR 797	
Tazewell	0.35	0.56	SR 644 (Bossevain Road)	Creek View Road	SR 748 (Tank Hill Road)	
Washington	1.80	2.90	Dead End	Fleenors Mem Road	Dead End	
Wise	0.60	0.97	US 58 Alt/SR 854	Dwina Road	Dead End	
York	0.20	0.32	Cul-de-Sac	Bayview Drive	SR 783 (Fairfield Drive)	
