= Virginia State Route 777 =

Secondary route designation

State Route 777

Route information
- Maintained by VDOT

Location
- Country: United States
- State: Virginia

Highway system
- Virginia Routes; Interstate; US; Primary; Secondary; Byways; History; HOT lanes

State Route 777 (SR 777) in the U.S. state of Virginia is a secondary route designation applied to multiple discontinuous road segments among the many counties. The list below describes the sections in each county that are designated SR 777.

== List ==
County	Length (mi)	Length (km)	From	Via	To	Notes
Accomack	0.60	0.97	Dead End	Cedar Creek Road	SR 653 (Poplar Cove Road)	
Albemarle	1.55	2.49	Dead End	Vineyard Road	Orange County line	
Amherst	0.32	0.51	SR 659 (Union Hill Road)	Gordons Fair Grounds Road	US 60 (Richmond Highway)	
Augusta	3.53	5.68	SR 616 (Dam Town Road)	Knightly Lane Kentmore Lane Piedmont Road	SR 774 (Cline River Road)	Gap between segments ending at different points along SR 778 Gap between dead ends
Bedford	1.00	1.61	US 460 (Lynchburg Salem Turnpike)	Shiloh Church Road	Dead End	
Botetourt	0.36	0.58	SR 778 (Hunters Tail Road)	Beachview Lane	Dead End	
Carroll	0.23	0.37	SR 778 (Kelly Road)	State Shed Road	Dead End	
Chesterfield	0.91	1.46	SR 887/SR 1774 (Trade Road)	Johnston Willis Drive	SR 1775 (Early Settlers Road)	
Fairfax	0.80	1.29	Cul-de-Sac	Center Road	SR 638 (Rolling Road)	
Fauquier	0.33	0.53	US 17 (James Madison Highway)	Old Zion Road	US 17 (James Madison Highway)	
Frederick	0.13	0.21	US 522 (Front Royal Pike)	Royal Avenue	SR 778 (Front Drive)	
Halifax	1.30	2.09	SR 40 (Stage Coach Road)	Jennings Lane	Dead End	
Henry	4.31	6.94	SR 620 (Old Liberty Road)	Mount Olivet Road	SR 457 (Old Chatham Road)	
James City	0.14	0.23	Dead End	Natures Way	SR 766	
Loudoun	1.30	2.09	SR 1795 (Palisade Parkway)	Tripleseven Road Environs Road	Cul-de-Sac	
Louisa	0.50	0.80	SR 655 (Bethany Church Road)	Lucy Duke Lane	Dead End	
Mecklenburg	0.08	0.13	Dead End	Cycle Lane	US 58	
Montgomery	1.58	2.54	US 460/SR 778	Brush Mountain Road	Blacksburg town limits	
Pittsylvania	4.97	8.00	SR 751 (Grassland Drive)	Yorkshire Drive	SR 605 (Toshes Road)	
Prince William	0.13	0.21	SR 294 (Prince William Parkway)	Crossing Place	SR 756 (Barrley Court)	
Pulaski	1.20	1.93	Dead End	Clark Road	SR 693 (Julia Simpkins Road)	
Roanoke	1.00	1.61	US 11 (West Main Street)	Fort Lewis Church Road	Dead End	
Rockbridge	0.80	1.29	SR 644	Drain Lane	Dead End	
Rockingham	2.90	4.67	SR 774 (Joseph Funk Lane)	Peter Drive Lane Well Hollow Road	SR 910 (Grist Mill Road)	Gap between segments ending at different points along SR 613 Gap between segments ending at different points along SR 752
Scott	1.78	2.86	SR 649 (Rye Cove Memorial Road)	Dingus Hollow Road	Dead End	
Shenandoah	0.20	0.32	SR 675 (Stoney Creek Road)	Merrick Lane	SR 769 (Saint Davids Church Road)	
Spotsylvania	0.16	0.26	Dead End	Round Hill Road	SR 612 (Catharpin Road)	
Stafford	0.36	0.58	Cul-de-Sac	Snow Meadow Lane	SR 775 (Cherry Blossom Lane)	
Tazewell	0.25	0.40	Dead End	Scenic Road	US 460	
Washington	0.40	0.64	Dead End	Buckeye Hollow Road	SR 600 (Green Cove Road)	
Wise	0.09	0.14	Dead End	Carroll Road	SR 776 (Floyd Road)	
York	0.28	0.45	Dead End	Raymond Drive	SR 622 (Seaford Road)	
