= Virginia State Route 774 =

Secondary route designation

State Route 774

Route information
- Maintained by VDOT

Location
- Country: United States
- State: Virginia

Highway system
- Virginia Routes; Interstate; US; Primary; Secondary; Byways; History; HOT lanes

State Route 774 (SR 774) in the U.S. state of Virginia is a secondary route designation applied to multiple discontinuous road segments among the many counties. The list below describes the sections in each county that are designated SR 774.

== List ==
County	Length (mi)	Length (km)	From	Via	To	Notes
Accomack	0.80	1.29	Dead End	Jollys Neck Road	SR 701 (Withams Road)	
Albemarle	2.90	4.67	Nelson County line	Bear Creek Road	Dead End	
Amherst	0.60	0.97	SR 677 (Dixie Airport Road)	Liggon Road	Dead End	
Augusta	3.90	6.28	SR 608 (Battlefield Road)	Piedmont Road Cline River Road Broad Run Road	SR 773 (Westview School Road)	Gap between segments ending at different points along SR 775
Bedford	0.80	1.29	Dead End	Wooldridge Road	SR 616 (Sandy Ford Road)	
Botetourt	0.15	0.24	SR 615 (Craig Creek Road)	Oriskany Square	SR 615 (Craig Creek Road)	
Carroll	1.45	2.33	North Carolina state line	Imogene Road	SR 620 (Old Pipers Gap Road)	
Chesterfield	0.20	0.32	SR 10 (Iron Bridge Road)	Tucker Road	Cul-de-Sac	
Fairfax	0.18	0.29	US 1 (Richmond Highway)	Woodlawn Trail	Dead End	
Fauquier	0.30	0.48	SR 710 (Rectortown Road)	Fortune Mountain Road	Dead End	
Franklin	0.60	0.97	Dead End	Moyerwood Road	SR 709 (Hopkins Road)	
Halifax	0.80	1.29	Dead End	Peaks Trail	SR 667 (Leda Road)	
Hanover	0.40	0.64	SR 722 (Landmark Cedar Road)	Grover Cocke Road	Dead End	
Henry	0.19	0.31	SR 609 (Dillons Fork Road)	Longview Drive	Dead End	
James City	0.31	0.50	Cul-de-Sac	Green Mountain Parkway	US 60 (Pocahontas Trail)	
Loudoun	1.10	1.77	SR 659 (Belmont Ridge Road)	Creighton Road	Dead End	
Louisa	0.30	0.48	Dead End	Smithfield Road	SR 605 (Shannon Hill Road)	
Mecklenburg	0.80	1.29	SR 626 (Blackridge Road)	Enbram Drive	Dead End	
Montgomery	1.25	2.01	Dead End	Price Station Road	SR 652 (McCoy Road)	
Pittsylvania	2.40	3.86	SR 40 (Gretna Road)	Darby Road	SR 605 (Toshes Road)	
Prince William	0.24	0.39	SR 1515 (Boundary Avenue)	Boundary Avenue	Dead End	
Pulaski	0.31	0.50	SR 636 (Alum Springs Road)	Second Morehead Lane	Dead End	
Roanoke	0.95	1.53	Dead End	Creekside Drive	SR 638 (Creekside Drive)	
Rockbridge	0.29	0.47	SR 793	Beth Horon Drive	Dead End	
Rockingham	1.70	2.74	SR 772 (Sparkling Springs Road)	Joseph Funk Lane	SR 613 (Turkeytown Road)	
Scott	6.21	9.99	SR 71	Long Hollow Road	SR 65	
Shenandoah	1.40	2.25	SR 771 (Boyer Road)	Veach Gap Road	Dead End	Gap between segments ending at different points along SR 678
Tazewell	0.10	0.16	SR 807 (Scarberry Road)	School Road	SR 644 (Abbs Valley Road)	
Washington	1.75	2.82	Dead End	Wright Road	SR 722 (McGinnis Lane)	
Wise	0.17	0.27	SR 621	Unnamed road	Dead End	
York	0.04	0.06	Dead End	Lorac Court	SR 771 (Lorac Road)	
