= Virginia State Route 795 =

Secondary route designation

State Route 795

Route information
- Maintained by VDOT

Location
- Country: United States
- State: Virginia

Highway system
- Virginia Routes; Interstate; US; Primary; Secondary; Byways; History; HOT lanes

State Route 795 (SR 795) in the U.S. state of Virginia is a secondary route designation applied to multiple discontinuous road segments among the many counties. The list below describes the sections in each county that are designated SR 795.

== List ==
County	Length (mi)	Length (km)	From	Via	To	Notes
Accomack	1.00	1.61	SR 679 (Metompkin Road)	Mitchell Drive	Dead End	
Albemarle	15.29	24.61	SR 6/SR 20 (Valley Street)	Hardware Street Blenheim Road President Road Rolling Road James Monroe Parkway	SR 53 (Thomas Jefferson Parkway)	
Amherst	0.80	1.29	SR 130 (Elon Road)	Winridge Road	SR 675 (Winesap Road)	
Augusta	6.82	10.98	SR 254 (Hermitage Road)	Glover Circle Saint James Road Entry School Road	Waynesboro city limits	
Bedford	0.70	1.13	SR 122 (Big Island Highway)	Gills Road	Dead End	
Botetourt	0.47	0.76	SR 794 (Wendover Road)	Orchard Drive	SR 779 (Valley Road)	
Campbell	1.10	1.77	SR 601 (Juniper Cliff Road)	Quick Road	Dead End	
Carroll	1.50	2.41	SR 696 (Holly Grove Road)	Parkwood Road	Dead End	
Chesterfield	1.00	1.61	US 360 (Hull Street Road)	Ledo Road	Dead End	
Fairfax	0.52	0.84	SR 1869 (Magnolia Lane)	Munson Road Tyler Street	SR 900 (Lake Street)	Gap between a dead end and SR 244
Fauquier	1.00	1.61	Dead End	Steward Road	SR 637 (Ships Store Road)	
Fluvanna	0.04	0.06	Dead End	Zion Park Road	Louisa County line	
Franklin	0.42	0.68	SR 640 (Five Mile Mountain Road)	Stave Mill Road	SR 40 (Franklin Street)	
Frederick	0.25	0.40	SR 796 (Purdue Drive)	Princeton Drive	SR 797/SR 1246	
Halifax	1.40	2.25	Dead End	Alchie Lane	US 501 (L P Bailey Memorial Highway)	
Hanover	3.30	5.31	SR 54 (West Patrick Henry Road)	Tower Road	Dead End	
Henry	0.35	0.56	US 220 Bus	Cherward Street	SR 1117 (Halifax Drive)	
James City	0.32	0.51	SR 715 (North Riverside Drive)	The Point Drive	SR 716 (Hampton Drive)	
Loudoun	0.09	0.14	Cul-de-Sac	Surreyfield Way	SR 662 (Canby Road)	
Louisa	0.25	0.40	Fluvanna County line	Zion Park Road	US 250 (Three Notch Road)	
Mecklenburg	1.26	2.03	US 58/SR 675	Henrick Crow Road	Dead End	
Montgomery	0.15	0.24	Dead End	Crown Road	Dead End	
Pittsylvania	2.00	3.22	SR 649 (Anderson Mill Road)	Emery Road	SR 797 (Green Bay Road)	
Prince William	0.21	0.34	Cul-de-Sac	Venus Court	SR 625 (Haymarket Drive)	
Pulaski	0.25	0.40	Dead End	Finks Farm Road	SR 710 (Mount Olivet Road)	
Roanoke	0.59	0.95	SR 687 (Penn Forest Boulevard)	Bernard Drive Fallowater Lane	Dead End	
Rockbridge	0.03	0.05	Dead End	Old Store Road	SR 700	
Rockingham	1.00	1.61	US 11 (Valley Pike)	Fairview Church Road	Dead End	
Scott	0.50	0.80	SR 646	No Mans Land Lane	Dead End	
Shenandoah	0.20	0.32	US 11 (Old Valley Pike)	Sawmill Lane	Dead End	
Spotsylvania	0.61	0.98	SR 649 (Mill Pond Road)	Todds Tavern Drive	Cul-de-Sac	
Stafford	0.44	0.71	Cul-de-Sac	Powell Lane	US 17 (Warrenton Road)	
Tazewell	0.09	0.14	SR 771 (Finch Avenue)	Bunny Street	SR 102	
Washington	0.38	0.61	SR 745 (Old Saltworks Road)	Linhaven Drive	SR 745 (Old Saltworks Road)	
Wise	0.24	0.39	US 23	Willis Drive	Dead End	
York	0.52	0.84	SR 1442 (Colonial Avenue)	Musket Drive	Cul-de-Sac	
