= Virginia State Route 797 =

Secondary route designation

State Route 797

Route information
- Maintained by VDOT

Location
- Country: United States
- State: Virginia

Highway system
- Virginia Routes; Interstate; US; Primary; Secondary; Byways; History; HOT lanes

State Route 797 (SR 797) in the U.S. state of Virginia is a secondary route designation applied to multiple discontinuous road segments among the many counties. The list below describes the sections in each county that are designated SR 797.

== List ==
| County | Length (mi) | Length (km) | From | Via | To | Notes |
|---|---|---|---|---|---|---|
| Accomack | 0.20 | 0.32 | SR 605 (Upshur Neck Road) | Crockett Street | SR 773 (Water Street) | |
| Albemarle | 0.60 | 0.97 | Dead End | Hillsboro Lane | US 250 (Rockfish Gap Turnpike) | |
| Amherst | 0.47 | 0.76 | Dead End | Camden Drive | SR 703 (Younger Drive) | |
| Augusta | 1.90 | 3.06 | SR 642 (Barrenridge Road) | Miller Road | SR 796 (Kiddsville Road) | |
| Bedford | 1.10 | 1.77 | SR 608 (White House Road) | Sleepy Hollow Road | Dead End | |
| Botetourt | 0.45 | 0.72 | US 11 (Lee Highway) | Rader Barn Road | Dead End | |
| Campbell | 0.70 | 1.13 | SR 650 (Mollies Creek Road) | County Airport Road | Dead End | |
| Carroll | 0.23 | 0.37 | SR 604 (Liberty Hill Road) | Mount Olivet Road | SR 94 (Ivanhoe Road) | |
| Chesterfield | 0.19 | 0.31 | Cul-de-Sac | White Bark Terrace | SR 701 (Whitepine Road) | |
| Fairfax | 0.16 | 0.26 | FR-956 (Little River Turnpike Frontage Road) | Green Spring Road | Dead End | |
| Fauquier | 0.25 | 0.40 | SR 701 (Gap Run Road) | Republican Street | Dead End | |
| Frederick | 0.11 | 0.18 | US 50 (Millwood Pike) | Tulane Drive | SR 795/SR 1246 | |
| Halifax | 2.70 | 4.35 | SR 711 (Harmony Road) | Traynham Grove Road | SR 658 (Cluster Springs Road/Turbeville Road) | |
| Hanover | 1.60 | 2.57 | US 33 (Mountain Road) | Rosmarin Road | SR 657 (Greenwood Church Road) | |
| Henry | 2.18 | 3.51 | Dead End | Richardson Road Murphy Road Seminole Drive | SR 609 (Daniels Creek Road) | Gap between segments ending at different points along US 220 Bus |
| Loudoun | 3.80 | 6.12 | Dead End | Mount Gilead Road | SR 704 (Harmony Church Road) | |
| Louisa | 0.38 | 0.61 | SR 807 | Duke Street | SR 22 (Davis Highway) | |
| Mecklenburg | 0.80 | 1.29 | SR 92 | Parsons Road | Dead End | |
| Pittsylvania | 4.00 | 6.44 | US 29 | Green Bay Road | SR 790 (Piney Road) | Gap between segments ending at different points along SR 649 |
| Pulaski | 0.40 | 0.64 | SR 100 (Clebone Road) | New Dublin Church Road | Dead End | |
| Roanoke | 0.30 | 0.48 | SR 1832 (Barrens Road) | Barrens Road | Dead End | |
| Rockbridge | 0.60 | 0.97 | US 11 (Lee Highway) | Pleasant Valley Road | Dead End | |
| Rockingham | 1.50 | 2.41 | SR 798 (Tenth Legion Road) | Oferell Drive Newdale School Road | SR 793 (Concord Church Road) | Gap between segments ending at different points along SR 796 |
| Scott | 1.12 | 1.80 | Dead End | Stallard Cemetery Lane | SR 72 | |
| Shenandoah | 0.10 | 0.16 | SR 675/SR 784 | North Grove Avenue | Dead End | |
| Tazewell | 0.10 | 0.16 | Dead End | Bentwood Road | SR 687 (Fork Ridge Road) | |
| Washington | 0.50 | 0.80 | SR 80 (Lindell Road) | Sherwood Drive | Dead End | |
| Wise | 0.57 | 0.92 | SR 633 (Bold Camp Road) | Cumbo Road | Dead End | |
| York | 1.42 | 2.29 | SR 604 (Barlow Road) | Skimino Road | Dead End | |
