= Virginia State Route 779 =

Secondary route designation

State Route 779

Route information
- Maintained by VDOT

Location
- Country: United States
- State: Virginia

Highway system
- Virginia Routes; Interstate; US; Primary; Secondary; Byways; History; HOT lanes

State Route 779 (SR 779) in the U.S. state of Virginia is a secondary route designation applied to multiple discontinuous road segments among the many counties. The list below describes the sections in each county that are designated SR 779.

== List ==
County	Length (mi)	Length (km)	From	Via	To	Notes
Accomack	3.62	5.83	SR 187/SR 316	Mears Station Road	SR 692 (Main Street)	
Albemarle	0.47	0.76	SR 801 (Rock Branch Lane)	Rock Branch Road	SR 710 (Taylors Gap Road)	
Amherst	4.80	7.72	SR 653	Mistover Drive	Dead End	
Augusta	1.20	1.93	SR 865 (Rockfish Road)	Strickley Road	SR 778 (Patterson Mill Road)	
Bedford	0.31	0.50	US 221 (Forest Road)	Mays Farm Road	Dead End	
Botetourt	14.72	23.69	Roanoke County line	Catawba Road Catawba Street Valley Road	US 11 (Lee Highway)	Gap between segments ending at different points along US 220
Campbell	0.53	0.85	SR 769 (Beechwood Drive)	Oakland Circle	SR 769 (Beechwood Drive)	
Carroll	0.30	0.48	US 58	Rollingwood Lane	SR 657 (Rollingwood Drive/Link Road)	
Fairfax	1.71	2.75	Dead End	Fordson Road	US 1 (Richmond Road)	
Fauquier	1.00	1.61	SR 643 (Meetze Road)	Turkey Run Road	Dead End	
Franklin	0.40	0.64	SR 40 (Franklin Street)	Liberty Road	Pittsylvania County line	
Frederick	0.45	0.72	SR 657 (Senseny Road)	Country Club Circle	End Circle	
Halifax	0.80	1.29	SR 697 (Coleman Drive)	Hudson Drive	US 58 (Philpott Road)	
Henry	1.85	2.98	SR 698 (Crestridge Road)	Crestview Drive	SR 57 (Fairystone Park Highway)	
Loudoun	2.50	4.02	SR 719 (Airmont Road)	Ebenezer Church Road	SR 719 (Airmont Drive)	
Louisa	0.45	0.72	Dead End	Ebenezer Road	US 522 (Pendelton Road)	
Mecklenburg	1.70	2.74	SR 722 (Cow Road)	Chicken Town Road	Dead End	
Montgomery	0.40	0.64	Dead End	Daisy Road	SR 652 (McCoy Road)	
Pittsylvania	0.95	1.53	Franklin County line	Liberty Road	SR 626 (Smith Mountain Road)	
Prince William	0.43	0.69	SR 28/SR 215	Chapel Springs Road	SR 28/SR 780	
Pulaski	0.11	0.18	SR 600	Joyce Way	Dead End	
Roanoke	3.63	5.84	SR 311 (Catawba Valley Drive)/SR 698 (Keffer Road)	Catawba Creek Road	Botetourt County line	
Rockbridge	0.45	0.72	Dead End	Keyes Mill Road	Buena Vista city limits	
Rockingham	0.70	1.13	SR 910 (Grist Mill Road)	Acker Lane	SR 721 (Green Hill Road)	
Scott	0.50	0.80	SR 704	Venus Branch Lane	Dead End	
Shenandoah	3.40	5.47	SR 691 (Judge Rye Road)	Ridge Hollow Road	SR 42 (Senedo Road)	
Stafford	0.56	0.90	SR 687 (Hope Road)	Summerwood Drive	SR 777 (Snow Meadow Lane)	
Tazewell	0.23	0.37	Dead End	Talon Road	SR 604 (Thompson Valley Road)	
Washington	1.50	2.41	SR 693 (Litchfield Road)	Hillandale Road	SR 741 (Maiden Creek Road)	
Wise	0.30	0.48	Dead End	Baker/Meade Road	SR 633 (Bold Camp Road)	
York	0.13	0.21	SR 716 (Hubbard Lane)	Scott Drive	SR 727 (Nelson Drive)	
