= List of highways numbered 772 =

Route 772, or Highway 772, can refer to:

== Canada ==
- Alberta Highway 772
- New Brunswick Route 772
- Saskatchewan Highway 772

== United States ==
- KY 772
- SR 772
- SR 772
- PA 772
- PR-772
- Virginia Route 772 (Loudoun County)
- Ashburn Station, formerly named "Route 772 Station"

Preceded by 771	Lists of highways 772	Succeeded by 773
