= Virginia State Route 766 =

Secondary route designation

State Route 766

Route information
- Maintained by VDOT

Location
- Country: United States
- State: Virginia

Highway system
- Virginia Routes; Interstate; US; Primary; Secondary; Byways; History; HOT lanes

State Route 766 (SR 766) in the U.S. state of Virginia is a secondary route designation applied to multiple discontinuous road segments among the many counties. The list below describes the sections in each county that are designated SR 766.

== List ==
County	Length (mi)	Length (km)	From	Via	To	Notes
Accomack	1.25	2.01	SR 679/SR 798	Wright Road	Dead End	
Albemarle	0.82	1.32	Dead End	Pea Ridge Drive	SR 614 (Garth Road)	
Amherst	1.59	2.56	US 29 Bus (Amherst Highway)	Dillard Road	SR 130 (Elon Road)	
Augusta	2.70	4.35	SR 764 (Towers Road)	Reeves Road	SR 727 (Millers Sawmill Road)	
Bedford	2.20	3.54	Dead End	Stoney Creek Road	SR 640 (Wheats Valley Road)	
Botetourt	0.15	0.24	SR 668 (Mount Pleasant Church Road)	Drewery Lane	Dead End	
Carroll	2.00	3.22	SR 761 (Lindsey Mill Road)	Windsong Road	SR 751 (Drypond Road)	Gap between dead ends
Chesterfield	0.20	0.32	SR 604 (Courthouse Road)	Onnies Drive	Dead End	
Fairfax	0.42	0.68	FR-785 (Little River Turnpike Frontage Road)	Championship Drive Horseshoe Drive	SR 649 (Hummer Road)	
Fauquier	0.32	0.51	SR 749	Prospect Avenue	Dead End	
Franklin	6.49	10.44	SR 764 (Carver Lee Road)	Swelling Road Beech Mountain Road	SR 40 (Franklin Street)	
Halifax	1.10	1.77	Dead End	Waltman Road	SR 667 (Leda Road)	
Hanover	0.44	0.71	SR 643 (New Ashcake Road)	Malboro Road	SR 768 (Cheraw Road)	
Henry	0.56	0.90	SR 921 (Airway Road)	Airway Road	Dead End	
James City	1.03	1.66	Dead End	Lakeview Drive	SR 610 (Forge Road)	
Loudoun	1.60	2.57	Dead End	Llangollen Road	SR 619 (Trappe Road)	
Louisa	0.68	1.09	Loop	Green Pastures Drive	SR 635 (Factory Mill Drive)	
Mecklenburg	0.20	0.32	US 58	Tucker Lane	Dead End	
Montgomery	0.60	0.97	Dead End	Warm Hearth Drive	Blacksburg town limits	
Pittsylvania	0.50	0.80	Dead End	Magnolia Road	SR 609 (Brights Road)	
Prince William	1.33	2.14	Dead End	Stillbrooke Road	SR 234 (Dumfries Road)	
Pulaski	0.11	0.18	SR 767 (Quesenberry Place)	Horn Court	US 11 (Lee Highway)	
Roanoke	0.45	0.72	US 220/SR 9356	Stable Road	US 220 (Franklin Road)	
Rockbridge	0.03	0.05	Dead End	Wilkinson Place	SR 251	
Rockingham	1.40	2.25	SR 726 (Weavers Road)	Eversole Road	SR 910 (Switchboard Road)	
Scott	0.10	0.16	SR 763 (Park Street)	Rollins Street Elm Street	SR 831 (Elm Street)	
Shenandoah	0.50	0.80	SR 710	Trotaway Lane	Dead End	
Spotsylvania	0.61	0.98	Cul-de-Sac	Nyland Road	SR 634 (Flippo Drive)	
Stafford	0.46	0.74	SR 637 (Telegraph Road)	Den-Rich Road	Cul-de-Sac	
Tazewell	0.40	0.64	SR 601 (Freestone Valley Road)	Wesleys Chapel Road	SR 601 (Freestone Valley Road)	
Washington	1.08	1.74	US 19 (Porterfield Highway)	Rustic Lane	US 19/SR 848	
Wise	0.13	0.21	Dead End	Pinehurst Street	SR 765 (Ash Street)	
York	0.23	0.37	SR 620 (Oriana Road)	Meadowview Drive	Cul-de-Sac	
