= 770 (disambiguation) =

770 may refer to:

- 770, the year
- The 770s (the years from 770 to 779)

== Technology ==
- 770 AM, an AM radio frequency
- Nokia 770, an Internet tablet device
- Telephone Area code 770, assigned to metropolitan Atlanta, Georgia and its suburbs

== Transport ==
- 770 (New Jersey bus), a bus route within the Passaic and Bergen counties of New Jersey
- Mercedes-Benz 770, a luxury car
- List of highways numbered 770

== Other uses ==
- Decree 770, a decree of the communist Romanian government of Nicolae Ceaușescu
- 770 Eastern Parkway, the headquarters of the Chabad-Lubavitch Hasidic group
