= Virginia State Route 783 =

Secondary route designation

State Route 783

Route information
- Maintained by VDOT

Location
- Country: United States
- State: Virginia

Highway system
- Virginia Routes; Interstate; US; Primary; Secondary; Byways; History; HOT lanes

State Route 783 (SR 783) in the U.S. state of Virginia is a secondary route designation applied to multiple discontinuous road segments among the many counties. The list below describes the sections in each county that are designated SR 783.

== List ==
| County | Length (mi) | Length (km) | From | Via | To | Notes |
|---|---|---|---|---|---|---|
| Accomack | 0.06 | 0.10 | SR 763 (Adams Road) | Adams Road | SR 316 (Greenbush Road) | |
| Albemarle | 0.70 | 1.13 | SR 231 (Gordonsville Road) | Millwood Lane | SR 22 (Louisa Road) | |
| Amherst | 1.33 | 2.14 | Dead End | Woodland Drive | SR 669 (Amelon Road) | |
| Augusta | 0.25 | 0.40 | SR 784 (Round Hill Road/Pine Bluff Road) | Pine Bluff Road | SR 617 (Round Hill School Road) | |
| Bedford | 0.10 | 0.16 | SR 639 (Coltons Mill Road) | Ebenezer Road | Dead End | |
| Botetourt | 0.25 | 0.40 | SR 649 (Lake Catherine Drive) | Cartsmill Gap Road | Dead End | |
| Campbell | 0.07 | 0.11 | Dead End | Wilkinson Drive | SR 713 (Powell Road) | |
| Carroll | 1.52 | 2.45 | SR 100 (Sylvatus Highway) | Deer Ridge Road | SR 100 (Sylvatus Highway) | |
| Chesterfield | 0.89 | 1.43 | Dead End | Doss Road | US 360 (Hull Street Road) | |
| Fairfax | 0.60 | 0.97 | Dead End | Platten Drive Edgelea Road | SR 673 (Lawyers Road) | |
| Fauquier | 0.30 | 0.48 | Dead End | Hideaway Road | SR 691 (Carters Run Road) | |
| Franklin | 1.20 | 1.93 | Dead End | Endicott Hill Road | SR 40 (Franklin Street) | |
| Frederick | 0.47 | 0.76 | SR 784 (Smithfield Avenue) | Brick Kiln Avenue | US 11 (Martinsburg Pike) | |
| Halifax | 1.30 | 2.09 | US 501 (Main Street/Halifax Road) | Golf Course Road | SR 651 (Cowford Road) | |
| Hanover | 0.49 | 0.79 | Dead End | Lewistown Road | US 1 (Washington Highway) | |
| Henry | 0.20 | 0.32 | Dead End | Antioch Church Street | US 220 Bus | |
| James City | 0.39 | 0.63 | SR 615 (Ironbound Road) | Ironbound Road | Cul-de-Sac | |
| Loudoun | 0.10 | 0.16 | SR 662 (Second Street) | Patrick Street | SR 665 (High Street) | |
| Louisa | 0.20 | 0.32 | SR 656 (Cedar Hill Road) | Houchens Road | Dead End | |
| Mecklenburg | 1.65 | 2.66 | Dead End | Chandler Road New Liberty Church Road | US 58 | |
| Montgomery | 0.20 | 0.32 | Dead End | Truman Avenue | US 11 (Radford Avenue) | |
| Pittsylvania | 1.95 | 3.14 | SR 649 (Anderson Mill Road) | Tomahawk Mill Road | Dead End | Gap between segments ending at different points along SR 644 |
| Prince William | 1.85 | 2.98 | SR 633 (Possum Point Road) | Cockpit Point Road | Dead End | |
| Pulaski | 0.21 | 0.34 | Dead End | Cloydview Drive | SR 100 (Clebone Road) | |
| Roanoke | 0.47 | 0.76 | SR 740/SR 912 | Bennett Springs Road | Dead End | |
| Rockbridge | 0.70 | 1.13 | SR 1112 (Twelfth Street) | Anderson Street | SR 1101 (Sixth Street) | |
| Rockingham | 1.60 | 2.57 | SR 776 (Morning View Road/Frank Lane Road) | Frank Lane Road John Brock Road | SR 753 (Hollar School Road) | |
| Scott | 0.10 | 0.16 | Dead End | Fir Street | SR 763 (Fir Street) | |
| Shenandoah | 0.30 | 0.48 | SR 681 (Osceola Road) | Patmos Road | Dead End | |
| Tazewell | 0.70 | 1.13 | US 460 | Acme Road | US 460 | |
| Washington | 1.50 | 2.41 | SR 710 (Alvarado Road) | Fairhaven Road | SR 708 (Bethel Road) | |
| Wise | 0.46 | 0.74 | SR 771 | Unnamed road | Dead End | |
| York | 0.18 | 0.29 | SR 784 (Bayview Drive) | Fairfield Drive | SR 658 (Yorkville Road) | |
