= Virginia State Route 796 =

Secondary route designation

State Route 796

Route information
- Maintained by VDOT

Location
- Country: United States
- State: Virginia

Highway system
- Virginia Routes; Interstate; US; Primary; Secondary; Byways; History; HOT lanes

State Route 796 (SR 796) in the U.S. state of Virginia is a secondary route designation applied to multiple discontinuous road segments among the many counties. The list below describes the sections in each county that are designated SR 796.

== List ==
County	Length (mi)	Length (km)	From	Via	To	Notes
Accomack	0.15	0.24	SR 187 (Nelsonia Road)	Davis Lane	Dead End	
Albemarle	1.01	1.63	US 250 (Rockfish Gap Turnpike)	Brookville Road	US 250 (Rockfish Gap Turnpike)	
Amherst	0.59	0.95	SR 675/SR 1319	Mountain View Drive	Dead End	
Augusta	6.41	10.32	SR 608 (Long Meadow Road)	Kiddsville Road Oak Grove Church Road George Home Road	SR 865 (Rockfish Road)	Gap between segments ending at different points along SR 828
Bedford	0.32	0.51	SR 24 (Stewartsville Road)	Ross Road	SR 635 (Lovers Lane)	
Botetourt	0.20	0.32	US 11 (Lee Highway)	Gravel Hill Road	SR 676 (Parsons Road)	
Campbell	0.20	0.32	Dead End	Tanzalon Drive	US 460 Bus	
Carroll	1.58	2.54	SR 742 (McGhee Road)	Frazier Hollow Road	SR 743 (Pleasant View Road)	
Chesterfield	0.10	0.16	US 360 (Hull Street Road)	Unnamed road	Dead End	
Fairfax	0.84	1.35	SR 3222 (Cindy Lane)	Hillbrook Drive Evergreen Lane	SR 244 (Columbia Pike)	
Fauquier	0.30	0.48	SR 28 (Catlett Road)	Gaskins Lane	Dead End	
Frederick	0.20	0.32	US 50 (Millwood Pike)	Purdue Drive	Dead End	
Halifax	1.50	2.41	North Carolina state line	Dabney Warren Road	SR 711 (Harmony Road)	
Hanover	0.60	0.97	Dead End	Darbys Road	SR 738 (Old Ridge Road)	
Henry	0.60	0.97	SR 1143 (Williams Street)	John Redd Boulevard	SR 609 (Daniel Creek Road)	
Loudoun	0.66	1.06	SR 287 (Berlin Turnpike)	Loudoun Street	SR 673 (Broadway East)	
Louisa	0.24	0.39	SR 795 (Zion Park Road)	Crossroads Center	Dead End	
Mecklenburg	0.30	0.48	SR 821 (Old National Highway)	Najobe Drive	Dead End	
Montgomery	0.09	0.14	Dead End	Blossom Road	SR 723 (Ellett Road)	
Pittsylvania	0.50	0.80	Dead End	Steam Way	SR 863 (Robertson Lane)	
Prince William	0.59	0.95	Dead End	Industrial Road	SR 660 (Hornbaker Road)	
Pulaski	0.30	0.48	Dead End	Akers Road	FR-64	
Roanoke	0.63	1.01	US 11 (West Main Street)	Pleasant Run Drive	US 11 (West Main Street)	
Rockbridge	0.50	0.80	SR 613 (Ridge Road)	Hillcrest View Road	Dead End	
Rockingham	3.20	5.15	SR 799 (Hupp Road)	Kagey Road Moores Mill Road	SR 620 (Mountain Valley Road)	Gap between segments ending at different points along US 11
Scott	0.40	0.64	SR 71 (East Jackson Street)	Gillenwater Loop	SR 71	
Shenandoah	0.85	1.37	Dead End	Hawkins Road	US 11 (Old Valley Pike)	
Stafford	0.31	0.50	Dead End	Patton Lane	SR 654 (Greenbank Road)	
Tazewell	0.30	0.48	SR 655 (Joe Hunt Road)	Creasy Road	Dead End	
Washington	0.25	0.40	Dead End	McFaddin Street	SR 802 (Mendota Road)	
Wise	0.05	0.08	Dead End	Pulaski Road	SR 72	
York	0.17	0.27	Dead End	Oak Street	US 17 (George Washington Memorial Highway)	
