= Virginia State Route 748 =

Secondary route designation

State Route 748

Route information
- Maintained by VDOT

Location
- Country: United States
- State: Virginia

Highway system
- Virginia Routes; Interstate; US; Primary; Secondary; Byways; History; HOT lanes

State Route 748 (SR 748) in the U.S. state of Virginia is a secondary route designation applied to multiple discontinuous road segments among the many counties. The list below describes the sections in each county that are designated SR 748.

== List ==
County	Length (mi)	Length (km)	From	Via	To	Notes
Accomack	0.10	0.16	SR 606 (Harbor Point Road)	Wallace Lane	SR 797 (Crockett Street)	
Albemarle	0.50	0.80	Dead End	Broken Sun Road	SR 633 (Heards Mountain Road)	
Amherst	0.35	0.56	SR 677 (Dixie Airport Road)	Abbits Drive	Dead End	
Augusta	0.70	1.13	SR 626 (Seawright Springs Road)	Flint Hill Road	SR 696 (Sydney Gap Road)	
Bedford	3.45	5.55	SR 608 (Altice Road)	Lipscombe Road	SR 24 (Stewartsville Road)	
Botetourt	1.00	1.61	SR 600 (Haymakertown Road)	Stone Coal Road	Dead End	
Campbell	0.40	0.64	SR 24/SR 692	Crown Lane	Dead End	
Carroll	0.10	0.16	Dead End	Ridge Road	SR 785 (Ridge Road)	
Chesterfield	0.35	0.56	SR 664 (Coalboro Road)	Clover Hill Road	Dead End	
Dinwiddie	0.49	0.79	Dead End	Unico Road	SR 652 (Asbury Road)	
Fairfax	0.20	0.32	US 1 (Richmond Highway)	Armistead Road	SR 642 (Lorton Road)	
Fauquier	0.60	0.97	SR 806 (Elk Run Road)	Eskridges Lane	Dead End	
Franklin	9.41	15.14	SR 602 (Ferrum Mountain Road)	Five Mile Mountain Road Turners Creek Road Ferrum School Road	SR 40 (Franklin Street)	Gap between segments ending at different points along SR 640
Frederick	0.23	0.37	SR 616 (McDonald Road)	Zeiger Drive	Dead End	
Halifax	2.50	4.02	SR 603 (Volens Road)	Slick Rock Road	SR 644 (Nathalie Road)	
Hanover	0.45	0.72	Ashland town limits	Cross Road	Dead End	
Henry	1.03	1.66	SR 677 (Hales Fish Pond Road)	Sunnybrook Circle	SR 687 (Stones Dairy Road)	
James City	0.15	0.24	Dad End	Mosby Lane	York County line	
Loudoun	3.71	5.97	Dead End	Melmore Place Sam Fred Road	SR 734 (Snickersville Turnpike)	
Louisa	0.45	0.72	US 33 (Jefferson Highway)	Jones Farm Road	Dead End	
Mecklenburg	0.30	0.48	Dead End	Hobgood Drive	SR 871 (Sandy Fork Road)	
Montgomery	0.05	0.08	SR 745 (Big Spring Drive)	Big Spring Drive	Dead End	
Pittsylvania	0.30	0.48	SR 665 (Rockford School Road)	Saunders Shop Road	SR 643 (Derby Road)	
Prince William	1.29	2.08	Dead End	Devils Reach Road	SR 749 (Swan Point Road)	
Pulaski	0.66	1.06	SR 658 (Delton Road)	Holbert Avenue	FR-47 (Kirby Road)	
Roanoke	0.27	0.43	SR 749 (Eastland Road)	Ballard Street	SR 618 (Highland Road)	
Rockbridge	0.59	0.95	SR 39 (Maury River Road)	Old Alleghany Circle	SR 747 (Palace Hotel Lane)	
Rockingham	3.10	4.99	SR 613 (Spring Creek Road)	Thomas Spring Road	SR 257 (Ottobine Road)	
Scott	0.10	0.16	SR 704 (East Charles Valley Road)	Unnamed road	Dead End	
Shenandoah	1.00	1.61	Dead End	Bonnet Hill Road	SR 675 (Stoney Creek Road)	
Spotsylvania	1.03	1.66	Cul-de-Sac	Three Cedars Lane	SR 639 (Leavells Road)	
Stafford	0.22	0.35	Dead End	Jack Ellington Drive	SR 752 (Richards Ferry Road)	
Tazewell	1.42	2.29	Dead End	Tank Hill Road	SR 644 (Bossevain Road)	
Washington	3.70	5.95	SR 745 (Old Saltworks Road)	Clinchburg Road Buchanan Road	SR 91 (Crescent Road)	Gap between segments ending at different points along SR 750
Wise	0.59	0.95	SR 633 (Bold Camp Road)	Unnamed road	Dead End	
York	0.06	0.10	Dead End	Chismans Point Road	SR 624 (Sparrer Road)	
