= Virginia State Route 770 =

Secondary route designation

State Route 770

Route information
- Maintained by VDOT

Location
- Country: United States
- State: Virginia

Highway system
- Virginia Routes; Interstate; US; Primary; Secondary; Byways; History; HOT lanes

State Route 770 (SR 770) in the U.S. state of Virginia is a secondary route designation applied to multiple discontinuous road segments among the many counties. The list below describes the sections in each county that are designated SR 770.

== List ==
County	Length (mi)	Length (km)	From	Via	To	Notes
Accomack	0.50	0.80	SR 695 (Saxis Road)	Flag Pond Road	Dead End	
Albemarle	0.20	0.32	Dead End	Mount Zion Church Road	SR 627 (Porters Road)	
Amherst	0.25	0.40	SR 661 (Stage Road)	Mount Airy Road	SR 663 (Coolwell Road)	
Augusta	0.90	1.45	SR 605 (Fountain Cave Road)	Cavehill Road Cosby Mill Lane	SR 825 (South River Road)	Gap between dead ends
Bedford	0.36	0.58	SR 607 (Montvale Street)	Price Street	Dead End	
Botetourt	0.90	1.45	SR 817 (Old Rail Road)	Edlo Lane	SR 615 (Craig Creek Road)	
Campbell	0.38	0.61	SR 1651 (Churchill Drive)	Bumgarner Drive	SR 835 (Jefferson Manor Drive)	
Carroll	1.10	1.77	SR 769 (Peacock Drive)	Hanging Tree Road	US 52 (Poplar Camp Road)	
Chesterfield	1.45	2.33	SR 638 (Cogbill Road)	Chesterwood Drive Meadowdale Boulevard	SR 641 (Dundas Road/Beulah Road)	
Dinwiddie	0.08	0.13	Cul-de-Sac	Olde Keswick Lane	Prince George County line	
Fairfax	0.07	0.11	Dead End	Unnamed road	SR 611 (Old Colchester Road)	
Fauquier	1.60	2.57	SR 647 (Crest Hill Road)	Putnams Mill Road	SR 736 (Thumb Run Road)	
Franklin	2.50	4.02	SR 768 (Lighthaven Road)	Old Henry Road	SR 769 (Larkin Branch Road)	
Frederick	0.22	0.35	US 522 (Frederick Pike)	Cross Junction Road	SR 693 (Collinsville Road)	
Halifax	1.20	1.93	Dead End	High Rock Trail	SR 676 (Thompson Store Road)	
Hanover	0.51	0.82	US 360 (Mechanicsville Turnpike)	Vaughan Drive	SR 1145 (Elliott Drive)	
Henry	0.51	0.82	SR 57 (Fairystone Park Highway)	Fair Oaks Drive	SR 903 (Henry Street)	
James City	0.06	0.10	SR 746 (Old Stage Road)	Overton Trail	SR 772 (Highfield Drive)	
Loudoun	0.80	1.29	SR 797 (Mount Gilead Road)	Dunlop Mill Road	SR 704 (Harmony Church Road)	
Louisa	0.31	0.50	US 522 (Zachary Taylor Highway)	Johnny Hall Road	Dead End	
Mecklenburg	0.30	0.48	Dead End	Old Plantation Road	SR 138	
Montgomery	0.45	0.72	SR 657 (Merrimac Road)	Remington Road	Dead End	
Pittsylvania	0.20	0.32	SR 665 (Rockford School Road)	Keesee Road	US 29	
Prince George	0.45	0.72	Dinwiddie County line	Keswick Lane	SR 622 (Fairwood Road)	
Prince William	2.30	3.70	Cul-de-Sac	River Forest Drive Occoquan Forest Drive	Dead End	
Pulaski	0.10	0.16	Dead End	Milstead Place	FR-44 (East Lee Highway)	
Roanoke	0.25	0.40	US 220 (Franklin Road)	Davis Boone Road	Dead End	
Rockbridge	6.42	10.33	Alleghany County line	Turnpike Road	SR 251/SR 672	
Rockingham	0.80	1.29	SR 613 (Whitmore Shop Road)	Clayborn Road	SR 613	
Scott	0.76	1.22	SR 794 (Mustang Street)	Mustang Street	SR 65	Gap between dead ends
Shenandoah	5.88	9.46	SR 678 (Fort Valley Road)	Dry Run Road	SR 678 (Fort Valley Road)	
Spotsylvania	0.64	1.03	Dead End	Northeast Drive	FR-696 (Overview Drive)	
Stafford	0.40	0.64	Cul-de-Sac	Wintergreen Lane	SR 648 (Shelton Shop Road)	
Tazewell	0.96	1.54	Russell County line	Ascue Road	SR 609 (Wardell Road)	
Washington	0.11	0.18	Dead End	Unnamed road	SR 630 (McCall Gap Road)	
Wise	0.20	0.32	Dead End	West Hatfield Road	SR 790 (West Norton Road)	
York	0.10	0.16	Dead End	Cemetery Lane	SR 710 (Lodge Road)	
