= Virginia State Route 793 =

Secondary route designation

State Route 793

Route information
- Maintained by VDOT

Location
- Country: United States
- State: Virginia

Highway system
- Virginia Routes; Interstate; US; Primary; Secondary; Byways; History; HOT lanes

State Route 793 (SR 793) in the U.S. state of Virginia is a secondary route designation applied to multiple discontinuous road segments among the many counties. The list below describes the sections in each county that are designated SR 793.

== List ==
County	Length (mi)	Length (km)	From	Via	To	Notes
Accomack	0.50	0.80	SR 693 (Neal Parker Drive)	Will Fisher Road	SR 695 (Saxis Road)	
Albemarle	0.33	0.53	SR 719 (Alberene Road)	Serene Lane	SR 719 (Alberene Road)	
Amherst	0.07	0.11	US 29 Bus	Amer Circle	Dead End	
Bedford	2.00	3.22	SR 608 (Altice Road)	Watson Road	SR 806 (Rucker Road)	
Botetourt	0.37	0.60	Dead End	Lakeview Road	SR 652 (Mountain Pass Road)	
Campbell	0.40	0.64	SR 609 (Stage Road)	Napier Road	Dead End	
Carroll	5.47	8.80	SR 607 (Iron Ridge Road)	Gambetta Road Sherwood Road	Dead End	
Chesterfield	0.34	0.55	SR 638 (Cogbill Road)	Kedleston Avenue	SR 2188 (Marty Boulevard)	
Fairfax	0.90	1.45	Dead End	Highland Lane Overbrook Road	SR 699 (Prosperity Avenue)	
Fauquier	1.25	2.01	Dead End	Shepherdstown Road	SR 600 (Broad Run Church Road)	
Franklin	4.91	7.90	Floyd County line	Runnett Bag Road	SR 40 (Franklin Street)	
Frederick	0.24	0.39	SR 656 (Greenwood Road)	Greenwood Avenue	SR 794 (Maloy Drive)	
Halifax	0.80	1.29	SR 360 (Mountain Road)	Duck Trail	Dead End	
Hanover	0.60	0.97	SR 646 (Hickory Hill Road)	Manaheim Road	SR 646 (Hickory Hill Road)	
Henry	1.52	2.45	SR 692 (Horsepasture Price Road)	Bouldin Road	SR 687 (Soapstone Road)	
Loudoun	0.25	0.40	SR 792 (Thomas Avenue)	Lake Drive	Cul-de-Sac	
Louisa	0.22	0.35	SR 621 (Peach Grove Road)	Miltons Lane	Cul-de-Sac	
Mecklenburg	0.60	0.97	SR 697 (Parkside Road)	Reeses Dead End	Dead End	
Montgomery	0.25	0.40	Dead End	Altoona School Road	SR 610 (Huffville Road)	
Pittsylvania	2.40	3.86	SR 57 (Callands Road)	Cherrystone Lake Road	SR 605 (Walkers Well Road)	
Prince William	0.05	0.08	Dead End	Shawnee Lane	SR 650 (Doves Lane)	
Pulaski	0.51	0.82	SR 738 (Robinson Tract Road)	Old Robinson Tract Road	SR 639 (Loving Field Road)	
Roanoke	0.06	0.10	Dead End	Artrip Lane	SR 777 (Fort Lewis Church Road)	
Rockbridge	0.60	0.97	SR 759 (Arnolds Valley Road)	Unnamed road	SR 773 (Lloyd Tolley Road)	
Rockingham	5.94	9.56	SR 618 (Lone Pine Road)	Long Meadow Drive Hupp Road Concord Church Road Endless Caverns Road	SR 620 (Mountain Valley Road)	Gap between segments ending at different points along US 11
Scott	0.19	0.31	SR 619 (Old Nickelsville Road)	Old Nickelsville Road	SR 71 (East Jackson Street)	
Shenandoah	0.15	0.24	SR 679 (Rittenour Road)	Ryman Road	SR 680 (Coffmantown Road)	
Tazewell	0.37	0.60	Tazewell town limits	Maplewood Lane	Tazewell town limits	
Washington	1.05	1.69	Dead End	Berry Creek Road	Abingdon town limits	
Wise	0.37	0.60	SR 621	Brummitt Hollow Road	Dead End	
York	0.15	0.24	SR 686 (Cheadle Loop Road)	Goose Creek Road	Dead End	
