= List of highways numbered 771 =

The following highways are numbered 771:

== United States ==
- Florida
  - Florida State Road 771 (former)
  - County Road 771 (Lee County, Florida)
  - County Road 771 (Sarasota County, Florida)
- Georgia State Route 771 (former)
- Ohio State Route 771
- Puerto Rico Highway 771

Preceded by 770	Lists of highways 771	Succeeded by 772
