= Virginia State Route 251 =

State highway in Virginia, United States

State Route 251

Route information
- Maintained by VDOT
- Length: 9.95 mi (16.01 km)
- Existed: 1933–present

Major junctions
- South end: SR 672 / SR 770 in Collierstown
- North end: US 11 / US 11 Bus. in Lexington

Location
- Country: United States
- State: Virginia
- Counties: Rockbridge, City of Lexington

Highway system
- Virginia Routes; Interstate; US; Primary; Secondary; Byways; History; HOT lanes
← US 250	→ SR 252

State Route 251 (SR 251) is a primary state highway in the U.S. state of Virginia. Known for most of its length as Collierstown Road, the state highway runs 9.95 miles (16.01 km) from SR 672 and SR 770 in Collierstown north to U.S. Route 11 (US 11) and US 11 Business in Lexington.

== Route description ==
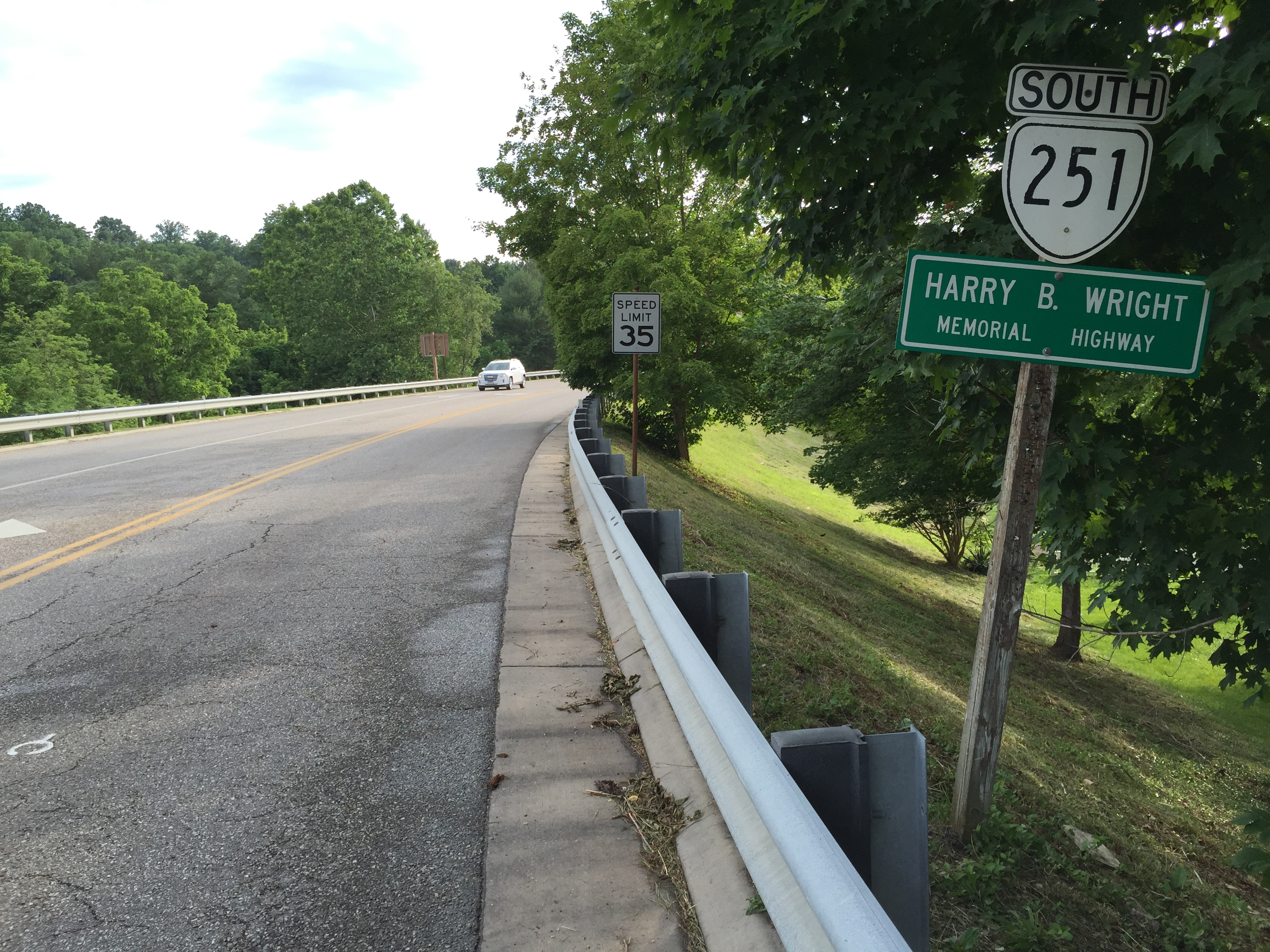
View south at the north end of SR 251 at US 11 and US 11 Bus. in Lexington

SR 251 begins at an intersection with Turnpike Road, which heads east as SR 672 and west as SR 770, at Collierstown in a valley southwest of House Mountain and east of North Mountain in western Rockbridge County. The state highway heads southeast as two-lane undivided Collierstown Road along Colliers Creek, which empties into Buffalo Creek. After following the latter creek, SR 251 has a winding ascent out of the stream valley. The state highway heads east into the independent city of Lexington, where the highway's name changes to Thornhill Road. When Thornhill Road veers northeast toward downtown Lexington, SR 251 continues along Link Road the short remaining distance to its northern terminus at US 11 (Lee Highway) and US 11 Business (Main Street) southwest of downtown Lexington.

=== History ===
The road originally went through Alleghany County, starting at what is now Virginia State Route 269 (previously U.S. Route 60) at Longdale Furnace. It used what is now SR 770 Turnpike Road to get to its current western end in Collerstown. This section was removed on or by May 1945, presumably due to the difficult drive around North Mountain. SR 770 to this day is impassable by certain large vehicles.

== Major intersections ==
County	Location	mi	km	Destinations	Notes
Rockbridge	Collierstown	0.00	0.00	SR 672 / SR 770 (Turnpike Road)	Southern terminus
Rockbridge	Effinger			SR 612 (Blue Grass Trail)	former SR 281 south
Rockbridge	Murat			SR 677 (Kygers Hill Road)	
Rockbridge				SR 764 (Possum Hollow)	former US 11 south
City of Lexington		9.95	16.01	US 11 (South Lee Highway) / US 11 Bus. north (Main Street)	Northern terminus
1.000 mi = 1.609 km; 1.000 km = 0.621 mi

< SR 805	District 8 State Routes; 1928–1933	SR 807 >
