= Virginia State Route 771 =

Secondary route designation

State Route 771

Route information
- Maintained by VDOT

Location
- Country: United States
- State: Virginia

Highway system
- Virginia Routes; Interstate; US; Primary; Secondary; Byways; History; HOT lanes

State Route 771 (SR 771) in the U.S. state of Virginia is a secondary route designation applied to multiple discontinuous road segments among the many counties. The list below describes the sections in each county that are designated SR 771.

== List ==
County	Length (mi)	Length (km)	From	Via	To	Notes
Accomack	0.08	0.13	SR 657 (Deep Creek Road)	Unnamed road	SR 825 (Savage Lane)	
Albemarle	0.62	1.00	Dead End	Glen Aire Drive	SR 676 (Tilman Road)	
Amherst	0.60	0.97	Dead End	Tomlin Road	SR 658 (Grandmas Hill Road)	
Augusta	2.55	4.10	SR 750 (Keezletown Road)	Gentry Road Airport Road Moss Lane	SR 256 (Weyers Cave Road)	Gap between segments ending at different points along SR 773
Bedford	0.04	0.06	SR 732 (Headens Bridge Road)	Mitchen Road	Dead End	
Botetourt	1.69	2.72	Dead End	Lakeridge Circle Murray Drive	Dead End	
Campbell	1.80	2.90	Dead End	Roundtree Road	SR 646 (Spring Mill Road)	
Carroll	2.20	3.54	SR 769 (Peacock Drive)	Lovell Road	SR 100 (Sylvatus Highway)	
Chesterfield	0.32	0.51	Cul-de-Sac	Broadmoor Road	SR 667 (Otterdale Road)	
Fairfax	0.41	0.66	SR 1035 (Edgewood Lane)	Higham Drive	SR 644 (Franconia Road)	
Fauquier	0.65	1.05	SR 672 (Duhollow Road)	Frys Lane	Dead End	
Franklin	1.60	2.57	SR 768 (Lighthaven Road)	Will Hill Road	SR 767/SR 837	
Frederick	0.51	0.82	SR 701 (Old Braddock Road)	Red Oak Road	US 522 (Frederick Pike)	
Goochland	0.63	1.01	Hanover County line	Echo Meadows Road	Hanover County line	
Halifax	0.80	1.29	Dead End	Deer Ridge Trail	SR 683/SR 685	
Hanover	1.22	1.96	SR 621 (Manakin Road)	Echo Meadows Road	SR 622 (Rockville Road)	Gap between segments ending at different points along the Goochland County line
Henry	0.70	1.13	SR 636 (Mitchell Road)	George Bateman Drive	Dead End	
James City	0.06	0.10	SR 746 (Old Stage Road)	Halfpenny Drive	SR 772 (Highfield Drive)	
Loudoun	1.79	2.88	SR 650 (Gleedsville Road)	The Woods Road	SR 621 (Evergreen Mills Road)	
Louisa	0.20	0.32	Dead End	Moss Lane	SR 690 (Burruss Mill Road)	
Mecklenburg	1.30	2.09	SR 712 (Palmer Springs Road)	Son Talley Road	Dead End	Gap between a dead end and US 1
Montgomery	0.20	0.32	SR 637 (Alleghany Springs Road)	Strawberry Circle	SR 637 (Alleghany Springs Road)	
Pittsylvania	2.00	3.22	Dead End	Pigg River Road Court Road	SR 608 (Ridgeway Road)	Gap between segments ending at different points along SR 605
Prince William	0.30	0.48	Dead End	Dyers Road	SR 610 (Cardinal Drive)	
Pulaski	0.20	0.32	SR 99 (Count Pulaski Drive)/SR 735 (Frog Level Court)	Craig Loop	SR 99 (Count Pulaski Drive)	
Roanoke	0.16	0.26	Roanoke city limits	Ridge Road	Dead End	
Rockbridge	0.60	0.97	Dead End	Elliot's Hill Lane	SR 764 (Possum Hollow Road)	
Rockingham	2.10	3.38	Dead End	Polecat Hollow Road Chrisman Road	SR 613 (Singers Glen Road)	
Scott	1.13	1.82	Dead End	McLelean Town Road	SR 675 (Midway Road)	
Shenandoah	3.70	5.95	SR 770 (Dry Run Road)	Boyer Road	SR 678 (Fort Valley Road)	
Spotsylvania	0.34	0.55	Dead End	Cosner Drive	US 17/SR 1035	
Stafford	0.07	0.11	Dead End	Summitt Terrace	SR 655 (Holly Corner Road)	
Tazewell	0.13	0.21	Dead End	Finch Avenue	SR 709 (Chestnut Street)	
Washington	0.15	0.24	Dead End	Idaho Drive	US 58 (Jeb Stuart Highway)	
Wise	0.52	0.84	SR 620 (Guest River Road)	Unnamed road	Dead End	
York	0.30	0.48	SR 662 (Arden Drive)	Ripley Road Lorac Road	SR 772 (Carrs Hill Road)	
