= Virginia State Route 747 =

Secondary route designation

State Route 747

Route information
- Maintained by VDOT

Location
- Country: United States
- State: Virginia

Highway system
- Virginia Routes; Interstate; US; Primary; Secondary; Byways; History; HOT lanes

State Route 747 (SR 747) in the U.S. state of Virginia is a secondary route designation applied to multiple discontinuous road segments among the many counties. The list below describes the sections in each county that are designated SR 747.

== List ==
| County | Length (mi) | Length (km) | From | Via | To | Notes |
|---|---|---|---|---|---|---|
| Accomack | 0.75 | 1.21 | SR 638 (Cashville Road) | Nancock Gardens Road | Dead End | |
| Albemarle | 1.60 | 2.57 | SR 600 (Watts Passage Road) | Preddy Creek Road | SR 640 (Gilbert Station Road) | |
| Amherst | 0.30 | 0.48 | Dead End | Rising Sun Circle | SR 657 (Cedar Gate Road) | |
| Augusta | 7.36 | 11.84 | SR 730 (Stokesville Road/Stribling Springs Road) | Freemason Run Road Mossy Creek Road | Rockingham County line | |
| Bedford | 8.87 | 14.27 | SR 24 (Stewartsville Road) | Joppa Mill Road Old Country Road | SR 722 (Five Forks Road) | |
| Botetourt | 0.43 | 0.69 | SR 1084 (Dove Court) | Authur Road | US 220 Alt (Cloverdale Road) | |
| Campbell | 0.69 | 1.11 | US 29 | Ewing Drive | Cul-de-Sac | |
| Carroll | 2.10 | 3.38 | SR 620 (Coulson Church Road) | Pine Grove Road | US 52 (Poplar Camp Road) | |
| Chesterfield | 0.20 | 0.32 | SR 646 (Taylor Road) | Hembrick Road | Dead End | |
| Dinwiddie | 0.35 | 0.56 | SR 611 (Wilkinson Road) | Wheelers Lane | Dead End | |
| Fairfax | 0.65 | 1.05 | Dead End | Sanger Street | SR 642 (Lorton Road) | |
| Fauquier | 1.05 | 1.69 | SR 602 (Rogues Road) | Weston Road | Dead End | |
| Franklin | 0.70 | 1.13 | SR 748 (Five Mile Mountain Road) | Hempfield Road | SR 642 (Foothills Road) | |
| Frederick | 0.22 | 0.35 | Dead End | Woodridge Lane | SR 856 (Spring Valley Drive) | |
| Halifax | 3.16 | 5.09 | US 58 (Philpott Road) | Flints Rock Road Solomon Road | Dead End | |
| Hanover | 0.30 | 0.48 | SR 627 (Pole Green Road) | Lee Davis Road | Dead End | |
| Henry | 1.03 | 1.66 | SR 609/SR 684 | Chestnut Street | SR 701 (Tenth Street/Chadmore Drive) | |
| James City | 0.34 | 0.55 | Cul-de-Sac | Tewning Road | Williamsburg city limits | |
| Loudoun | 0.45 | 0.72 | Dead End | Berryman Lane | SR 748 (Sam Fred Road) | |
| Louisa | 0.10 | 0.16 | Fluvanna County line | Two County Lane | Dead End | |
| Mecklenburg | 0.47 | 0.76 | SR 723 (Shiney Rock Road) | Hill Top Road | Dead End | |
| Montgomery | 0.25 | 0.40 | Dead End | Pepper Run Road | SR 785 (Catawba Road) | |
| Pittsylvania | 1.27 | 2.04 | SR 750 (Mount Cross Road) | Pinecroft Road | SR 863 (Laniers Mill Road) | |
| Prince William | 0.43 | 0.69 | SR 649 (Brentsville Road) | Sinclair Lane | SR 746 (Smithfield Road) | |
| Pulaski | 5.22 | 8.40 | SR 100 | Old Route 11 | US 11 (Lee Highway) | |
| Roanoke | 0.47 | 0.76 | SR 668 (Yellow Mountain Road) | Goodman Road | SR 666 (Bandy Road) | |
| Rockbridge | 0.38 | 0.61 | SR 39 (Maury River Road) | Palace Hotel Lane | Dead End | |
| Rockingham | 1.60 | 2.57 | Augusta County line | Mossy Creek Road | SR 727 (Spring Creek Road) | |
| Scott | 0.09 | 0.14 | SR 704 (East Charles Valley Road) | Unnamed road | Dead End | |
| Shenandoah | 3.60 | 5.79 | SR 654 (Zion Church Road) | Riverview Drive | Dead End | |
| Spotsylvania | 1.89 | 3.04 | SR 1726 (Millwood Drive) | Old Mill Lane | SR 608 (Robert E Lee Drive) | |
| Stafford | 0.15 | 0.24 | SR 753 (Enon Road) | Beauregard Drive | Cul-de-Sac | |
| Tazewell | 1.21 | 1.95 | SR 644 (Boissevain Road) | Old River Road | SR 644 (Bossevain Road) | |
| Washington | 2.80 | 4.51 | SR 611 (North Fork River Road) | Tumbling Creek Road | Dead End | Gap between segments ending at different points along SR 613 |
| Wise | 0.16 | 0.26 | SR 745 (Oakdale Street) | Willow Street | Dead End | |
| York | 0.41 | 0.66 | Dead End | Massie Lane | SR 606 (Running Man Trail) | |
