= List of highways numbered 770 =

The following highways are numbered 770:

== United States ==
- KY 770
- LA 770
- NC 770
- Route 770
- SR 770
- PA 770
- PR-770
- FM 770
- SR 770

Preceded by 769	Lists of highways 770	Succeeded by 771
