= House Mountain (Rockbridge County, Virginia) =

Mountain in Virginia, United States

Coordinates: 37°49′51″N 79°33′43″W

House Mountain is a natural landmark in Rockbridge County, Virginia, USA. The mountain consists of two peaks, one called "Little House Mountain" and the other "Big House Mountain". Situated five miles from Lexington, it is a popular hiking trail for the people of the city and the surrounding counties.

Big House Mountain has a height of 3,645 feet (1,111 m).
