= Virginia State Route 768 =

Secondary route designation

State Route 768

Route information
- Maintained by VDOT

Location
- Country: United States
- State: Virginia

Highway system
- Virginia Routes; Interstate; US; Primary; Secondary; Byways; History; HOT lanes

State Route 768 (SR 768) in the U.S. state of Virginia is a secondary route designation applied to multiple discontinuous road segments among the many counties. The list below describes the sections in each county that are designated SR 768.

== List ==
County	Length (mi)	Length (km)	From	Via	To	Notes
Accomack	0.50	0.80	Dead End	Rice Farm Road	SR 614 (Craddock Neck Road)	
Albemarle	0.39	0.63	SR 631 (Rio Road)	Penn Park Road	Dead End	
Amherst	0.60	0.97	Dead End	Naked Creek Lane	SR 612 (Meredith Lane)	
Augusta	1.61	2.59	SR 994 (Samuel Bears Road)	Dices Spring Road	SR 276 (Keezletown Road)	
Bedford	0.60	0.97	Dead End	Templeton Mill Road	SR 645 (Trents Ferry Road)	
Botetourt	0.45	0.72	Dead End	West Road	SR 603 (Zimmerman Road)	
Carroll	2.80	4.51	SR 749 (Little Vine Road)	Whitetown Road	SR 771 (Lovell Road)	
Chesterfield	0.46	0.74	Dead End	Old Baileys Bridge Road	SR 654 (Bailey Bridge Road)	
Fairfax	0.65	1.05	SR 600 (Gunston Road)	Mount Vernon Boulevard	SR 4320 (River Road)	
Fauquier	0.60	0.97	Dead End	Kilkenny Road	SR 688 (Lees Manor Road)	
Franklin	2.52	4.06	SR 605 (Henry Road)	Lighthaven Road	SR 767 (Prillaman Switch Road)	
Halifax	0.75	1.21	Dead End	Hendricks Road	SR 711 (Alton Post Office Road)	
Hanover	0.27	0.43	Dead End	Cheraw Road	SR 766 (Malboro Road)	
Henry	0.60	0.97	Dead End	Old D&W Road	SR 787 (Station Drive)	
James City	0.24	0.39	Cul-de-Sac	North Cove Road	SR 646 (Newman Road)	
Loudoun	0.13	0.21	SR 697 (Nixon Road)	Beamertown Road	Dead End	
Louisa	0.14	0.23	FR-191 (Crew Road)	McGhee Loop	SR 208 (Courthouse Road)	
Mecklenburg	0.73	1.17	SR 626 (Regional Airport Road)	Allen Road	Dead End	
Montgomery	0.38	0.61	SR 625 (Big Falls Road)	Quartz Lane	Dead End	
Pittsylvania	9.12	14.68	SR 608 (Ridgeway Road)	Milam Road Bibee Road Summerset Road North	Dead End	Gap between segments ending at different points along SR 672
Prince William	0.53	0.85	SR 760/Manassas Park city limits	Bull Run Road	Dead End	
Pulaski	0.05	0.08	SR 766 (Horn Court)	Chrisley Place	Dead End	
Roanoke	0.74	1.19	Dead End	Olsen Road	SR 1832 (Barrens Road)	
Rockbridge	0.68	1.09	Dead End	Saville Lane	SR 611 (South Buffalo Road)	
Rockingham	1.70	2.74	SR 761 (Sky Road)	Antioch Road	SR 910 (Fort Lynne Road)	
Scott	0.75	1.21	US 23	Solon Street	Loop	
Shenandoah	0.12	0.19	SR 42 (Senedo Road)	Union Church Road	SR 623 (Back Road)	
Spotsylvania	1.28	2.06	Dead End	Blount Drive	SR 601 (Lewistown Road)	
Stafford	0.68	1.09	SR 608 (Brooke Road)	King Georges Grant Road	Cul-de-Sac	
Tazewell	0.70	1.13	SR 626 (Ravens Nest Branch Road)	Creed Branch Road	Dead End	
Washington	0.60	0.97	Dead End	Brandy Lane	SR 700 (Rich Valley Road)	
Wise	1.40	2.25	Dead End	Laurel Street Old Mill Village Road Unnamed road	Dead End	
York	0.10	0.16	Dead End	Thomas Road	SR 663 (Robanna Drive)	
