= Virginia State Route 792 =

Secondary route designation

State Route 792

Route information
- Maintained by VDOT

Location
- Country: United States
- State: Virginia

Highway system
- Virginia Routes; Interstate; US; Primary; Secondary; Byways; History; HOT lanes

State Route 792 (SR 792) in the U.S. state of Virginia is a secondary route designation applied to multiple discontinuous road segments among the many counties. The list below describes the sections in each county that are designated SR 792.

== List ==
County	Length (mi)	Length (km)	From	Via	To	Notes
Accomack	0.45	0.72	Dead End	Sam Byrd Lane	SR 688 (Cattail Road)	
Albemarle	0.35	0.56	Dead End	Stump Town Lane	SR 719 (Alberene Road)	
Amherst	0.30	0.48	SR 1304 (Sunset Circle)	Clearview Road	US 29 Bus	
Augusta	7.71	12.41	SR 1427 (Grand Station Road)	Sangers Lane Balsley Road Indian Mound Road Riverside Avenue Hillside Drive	Dead End	
Bedford	1.45	2.33	Dead End	Tucker Terrace Whitman Road	Dead End	
Botetourt	0.74	1.19	Dead End	Emerald Lake Drive	SR 793 (Lakeview Road)	
Campbell	0.70	1.13	Dead End	Flying W Road	SR 600 (Sugar Hill Road)	
Carroll	1.75	2.82	SR 97 (Pipers Gap Road)	Tower Road	Galax city limits	
Chesterfield	0.34	0.55	Dead End	Mason Avenue	SR 10 (Hundred Road)	
Fairfax	0.11	0.18	SR 644 (Franconia Road)	Telegraph Corner Lane	SR 611 (Telegraph Road)	
Fauquier	0.30	0.48	Dead End	Biscuit Mountain Road	SR 600 (Beverlys Mill Road)	
Franklin	1.90	3.06	Floyd County line	Laurel Bluff Road	SR 793 (Runnett Bag Road)	
Frederick	0.19	0.31	Cul-de-Sac	Plantation Drive	SR 657 (Senseny Road)	
Halifax	1.95	3.14	SR 658 (Melon Road)	Wade Pond Road	Dead End	
Hanover	0.25	0.40	Dead End	Hughes Road	US 360 (Mechanicsville Turnpike)	
Henry	0.08	0.13	Dead End	Amos Road	Dead End	
Loudoun	0.23	0.37	SR 821 (Lakeland Drive)	Thomas Avenue	Fairfax County line	
Louisa	0.50	0.80	Dead End	Carter Road	SR 613 (Poindexter Road)	
Mecklenburg	0.60	0.97	Dead End	Horseshoe Road	SR 695 (Philbeck Crossroads)	
Montgomery	0.20	0.32	Dead End	Testerman Drive	US 11 (Radford Road)	
Pittsylvania	7.18	11.56	SR 1302 (Leftwich Street)	Henry Street Tucker Road	SR 40 (Gretna Road)	Gap between segments ending at different points along SR 671
Prince William	1.13	1.82	SR 650 (Doves Lane)	Bradley Forest Road	SR 649 (Brentsville Road)	
Pulaski	1.00	1.61	Dead End	Davis Hollow Road Roger Loop	SR 738 (Robinson Tract Road)	
Roanoke	0.14	0.23	Dead End	Downing Street	Dead End	
Rockbridge	0.42	0.68	US 501 (Glasgow Highway)	Bennett's Run Road	US 501 (Glasgow Highway)	
Rockingham	1.70	2.74	Dead End	Crossroads Lane	SR 617 (Spar Mine Road)	
Scott	0.93	1.50	SR 71	Slabtown Circle	SR 71	
Shenandoah	0.10	0.16	SR 42 (Senedo Road)	Church Road	SR 682 (Readus Road)	
Tazewell	0.10	0.16	SR 752 (Clearview Road)	Coach Road	Dead End	
Washington	0.45	0.72	Dead End	Bethany Lane	SR 700 (Rich Valley Road)	
Wise	0.32	0.51	Dead End	Unnamed road	SR 639	
York	0.66	1.06	SR 620 (Lakeside Drive)	Old Lakeside Drive	SR 620 (Lakeside Drive)	
