= Virginia State Route 794 =

Secondary route designation

State Route 794

Route information
- Maintained by VDOT

Location
- Country: United States
- State: Virginia

Highway system
- Virginia Routes; Interstate; US; Primary; Secondary; Byways; History; HOT lanes

State Route 794 (SR 794) in the U.S. state of Virginia is a secondary route designation applied to multiple discontinuous road segments among the many counties. The list below describes the sections in each county that are designated SR 794.

== List ==
County	Length (mi)	Length (km)	From	Via	To	Notes
Accomack	0.25	0.40	US 13 (Lankford Highway)	Davis Drive	SR 689 (Mappsville Road)	
Albemarle	0.20	0.32	US 250 (Richmond Road)	Three Chopt Road	SR 616 (Union Mill Road)	
Amherst	0.20	0.32	SR 712 (Pendleton Drive)	Poplar Grove Circle	US 60 (Richmond Highway)	
Augusta	4.10	6.60	SR 792 (Balsley Road/Sangers Lane)	Sangers Lane	SR 642 (Barrenridge Road)	
Bedford	1.20	1.93	SR 645 (Trents Ferry Road)	Fox Hill Road	Dead End	
Botetourt	0.18	0.29	US 220 (Roanoke Road)	Wendover Road	Dead End	
Campbell	0.30	0.48	SR 648 (Nowlins Mill Road)	Peal Road	Dead End	
Carroll	1.00	1.61	SR 620 (Old Pipers Gap Road)	Longleaf Road	SR 620 (Old Pipers Gap Road)	
Chesterfield	0.52	0.84	Dead End	Stanley Drive	SR 805	
Fairfax	0.42	0.68	SR 795 (Tyler Street)	Washington Drive	SR 7 (Leesburg Pike)	
Fauquier	1.11	1.79	SR 611 (Sowego Road)	Heddings Road	Dead End	
Franklin	0.19	0.31	SR 40/SR 819	Edwardsway Road	SR 662 (Edwards Way Road/Jacks Creek Road)	
Frederick	0.42	0.68	SR 656 (Greenwood Road)	Maloy Drive	SR 657 (Senseny Road)	
Halifax	1.26	2.03	SR 734 (Red Bank Road)	White Oak Forks Road	SR 601 (Bucksheal Road)	
Hanover	0.20	0.32	SR 30 (Kings Dominion Boulevard)	Short Cut Road	SR 759 (Pleasants Circle)	
Henry	0.48	0.77	Dead End	Paul Street	SR 609 (Daniel Creek Road)	
Loudoun	0.13	0.21	Dead End	Guinea Bridge Road	SR 611 (Telegraph Springs Road)	
Louisa	0.30	0.48	Dead End	Ponderosa Road	SR 639 (Doctors Road)	
Mecklenburg	0.70	1.13	Dead End	Wards Road	SR 47	
Montgomery	0.20	0.32	Dead End	Ziegler Street	US 11 (Radford Road)	
Pittsylvania	7.73	12.44	US 29	Old Mine Road Homestead Road	SR 672 (Pittsville Road)	Gap between segments ending at different points along SR 790
Prince William	0.31	0.50	SR 646 (Aden Road)	Sowder Place	Cul-de-Sac	
Pulaski	0.20	0.32	SR 738 (Robinson Tract Road)	Bopp Hill Road	SR 738 (Robinson Tract Road)	
Roanoke	0.11	0.18	Dead End	Sycamore Drive	SR 740 (Carvins Cove Road)	
Rockbridge	0.80	1.29	Dead End	Mores Trail	SR 706 (Steeles Fort Road)	
Rockingham	1.28	2.06	US 11 (Valley Pike)	Craney Island Road	SR 620 (Smith Creek Road/Mountain Valley Road)	
Scott	0.23	0.37	SR 65	Mustang Street	Dead End	
Shenandoah	0.20	0.32	Strasburg town limits	Colley Block Road	Dead End	
Washington	0.91	1.46	Abingdon town limits	Stone Mill Road	SR 670 (Spoon Gap Road/Vances Mill Road)	
Wise	0.10	0.16	Dead End	Grand View Drive	SR 711 (Dogwood Lane)	
York	0.13	0.21	Cul-de-Sac	Creek Circle	SR 712 (York Point Road)	
