= Virginia State Route 778 =

Secondary route designation

State Route 778

Route information
- Maintained by VDOT

Location
- Country: United States
- State: Virginia

Highway system
- Virginia Routes; Interstate; US; Primary; Secondary; Byways; History; HOT lanes

State Route 778 (SR 778) in the U.S. state of Virginia is a secondary route designation applied to multiple discontinuous road segments among the many counties. The list below describes the sections in each county that are designated SR 778.

== List ==
County	Length (mi)	Length (km)	From	Via	To	Notes
Accomack	1.15	1.85	SR 638 (Cashville Road)	Locust Grove Road	Cul-de-Sac	
Albemarle	0.30	0.48	SR 712 (Plank Road)	Johnson Road	Dead End	
Amherst	6.90	11.10	US 60 (Lexington Turnpike)	Lowesville Road	Nelson County line	Formerly SR 158
Augusta	11.47	18.46	SR 750 (Keezletown Road)	Knightly Mill Road Patterson Mill Road Harriston Road	SR 661 (Horse Head Road)	Gap between segments ending at different points along SR 608 Gap between segments ending at different points along US 340
Bedford	0.25	0.40	Dead End	Turkey Toe Road	SR 623 (Turkey Foot Road)	
Botetourt	0.49	0.79	SR 657 (Rainbow Forest Drive)	Hunters Trail	Dead End	
Campbell	0.75	1.21	Dead End	Hughes Road	US 501 (Brookneal Highway)	
Carroll	2.66	4.28	SR 702 (Stable Road)	Kelly Road Pottery Drive Autumnview Road Sunbelt Drive	SR 608 (Old Appalachian Trail Road)	Gap between segment sending at different points along SR 683
Fairfax	0.25	0.40	US 1 (Richmond Highway)	Woodlawn Trail	Dead End	
Fauquier	0.57	0.92	Dead End	Moore Road	SR 738 (Wilson Road)	
Franklin	4.64	7.47	SR 780 (Jamison Mill Road)	Nicholas Creek Road Republican Church Road	SR 623 (Ingramville Road)	Gap between segments ending at different points along SR 605
Frederick	0.20	0.32	Dead End	Front Drive	US 522 (Front Royal Pike)	
Halifax	4.80	7.72	SR 746 (Mount Laurel Road)	Green Valley Road	SR 600 (Black Walnut Road)	
Hanover	0.95	1.53	SR 675 (Auburn Mill Road)	Woodstock Road	Cul-de-Sac	
Henry	2.66	4.28	SR 663 (Barrows Mill Road)	Terrys Mountain Road	SR 457 (Old Chatham Road)	
Loudoun	0.30	0.48	Dead End	Cooksville Road	SR 722 (Lincoln Road)	
Louisa	0.27	0.43	Dead End	Bus Garage Drive	SR 22 (Davis Highway)	
Mecklenburg	1.25	2.01	SR 621 (Country Club Road)	Taylor Road	US 1	
Montgomery	0.23	0.37	Dead End	Mountain Mission Church Road	US 460/SR 777	
Pittsylvania	7.20	11.59	SR 626 (Smith Mountain Road)	Jasmine Road Springtree Road	Dead End	Gap between segments ending at different points along SR 605
Pulaski	1.50	2.41	Dead End	Dallas Freeman Road	SR 693 (Lead Mine Road)	
Roanoke	1.60	2.57	Dead End	Twine Hollow Road Glen Mary Drive	Dead End	
Rockbridge	0.90	1.45	SR 610 (Plank Road)	Willow Pond Lane	Dead End	
Rockingham	1.23	1.98	SR 779 (Acker Lane)	Brenneman Church Road	SR 42 (Harpine Highway)	
Scott	0.80	1.29	Dead End	Morning Star Lane	SR 614 (Nottingham Road)	
Shenandoah	0.49	0.79	SR 620 (Smith Creek Road)	Quail Lane	Dead End	
Spotsylvania	0.07	0.11	SR 777 (Round Hill Road)	Landon Lane	Dead End	
Stafford	0.07	0.11	Cul-de-Sac	Maple Leave Court	SR 775 (Cherry Blossom Lane)	
Tazewell	0.43	0.69	SR 805 (Southerland Branch Road)	Southerland Branch Road	Dead End	
Washington	0.24	0.39	SR 91	Maple Bend Road	SR 91	
Wise	0.18	0.29	Dead End	Yellow Hill Road	SR 761 (Dan Hall Road)	
York	0.26	0.42	Dead End	Kenneth Drive	SR 777 (Raymond Drive)	
