= Virginia State Route 799 =

Secondary route designation

State Route 799

Route information
- Maintained by VDOT

Location
- Country: United States
- State: Virginia

Highway system
- Virginia Routes; Interstate; US; Primary; Secondary; Byways; History; HOT lanes

State Route 799 (SR 799) in the U.S. state of Virginia is a secondary route designation applied to multiple discontinuous road segments among the many counties. The list below describes the sections in each county that are designated SR 799.

== List ==
County	Length (mi)	Length (km)	From	Via	To	Notes
Albemarle	0.40	0.64	Fluvanna County line	Beaverdam Road	Louisa County line	
Amherst	0.53	0.85	SR 635 (Buffalo Springs Turnpike)	Meadow Hollow Loop	SR 642 (Meadow Hollow Road)	
Augusta	0.60	0.97	SR 827 (Henkle Road)	Dalhousie Road Duke Road	Waynesboro city limits	
Bedford	0.30	0.48	US 221 (Forest Road)	Rock Castle Road	Dead End	
Botetourt	2.52	4.06	SR 640 (Brughs Mill Road)	Ammen Road	SR 640 (Brughs Mill Road)	
Campbell	1.12	1.80	Dead End	Pettigrew Drive	SR 609 (Stage Road)	
Carroll	0.90	1.45	Grayson County line	Crestwood Drive	SR 718 (Wolfpen Ridge Road)	
Chesterfield	0.12	0.19	Dead End	Inge Road	SR 10 (Hundred Road)	
Fairfax	0.46	0.74	SR 2930 (Beechwood Road)	Pickwick Lane Paul Spring Road	SR 629 (Fort Hunt Road)	
Fauquier	0.75	1.21	SR 737 (Conde Road)	Rattle Branch Road	Dead End	
Franklin	0.27	0.43	Dead End	Meadow Branch Road	SR 613 (Naff Road)	
Frederick	0.18	0.29	US 522 (Frederick Pike)	Shane Lane	Dead End	
Halifax	0.40	0.64	Dead End	Alex Lane	SR 649	
Hanover	0.50	0.80	SR 627 (Pole Green Road)	Woodlawn Drive	Dead End	
Henry	0.65	1.05	US 220 Bus	Lafayette Avenue Dexter Street	SR 1141 (Stultz Road)	
Loudoun	0.50	0.80	SR 663 (Downey Mill Road)	Booth Road	SR 668 (Taylorstown Road)	
Louisa	1.00	1.61	Albemarle County line	Beaverdam Road	SR 600 (Campbell Road)	
Mecklenburg	0.10	0.16	SR 664 (Union Level Road)	Boat Dock Road	Dead End	
Montgomery	0.09	0.14	Dead End	Jade Drive	SR 114 (Peppers Ferry Boulevard)	
Pittsylvania	9.23	14.85	SR 57	Climax Road	SR 605 (Toshes Road)	
Prince William	0.26	0.42	SR 792 (Bradley Forest Road)	Forestview Drive	Cul-de-Sac	
Pulaski	1.40	2.25	Dead End	Claytor Dam Road	SR 611 (Wilderness Road)	
Roanoke	0.10	0.16	Dead End	Chevy Road	SR 706 (Elm View Road)	
Rockbridge	0.55	0.89	SR 759 (Arnolds Valley Road)	Cedar Bottom Road	Dead End	
Rockingham	4.50	7.24	SR 798 (Hillyard Drive)	Hupp Road Piney Woods Road Kay Drive	Dead End	Gap between segments ending at different points along SR 793 Gap between segments ending at different points along SR 619
Scott	0.07	0.11	SR 798 (Highland Street)	Lombard Street	US 23	
Shenandoah	0.57	0.92	Dead End	Posey Hollow Road	SR 644 (Millner Road)	
Stafford	0.31	0.50	Cul-de-Sac	Unnamed road	SR 798 (England Run Lane)	
Tazewell	0.14	0.23	SR 798 (Byrd Street)	Byrd Street	SR 702 (Pauley Street)	
Washington	1.50	2.41	Dead End	Gum Hill Road	SR 627 (Wolf Run Road)	
Wise	0.15	0.24	SR 620 (Guest River Road)	Eisenhower Road	Dead End	
York	0.50	0.80	Cul-de-Sac	Production Drive	US 17 (George Washington Memorial Highway)	
