= Virginia State Route 65 =

State highway in western Virginia, US

State Route 65

Route information
- Maintained by VDOT
- Length: 34.06 mi (54.81 km)
- Existed: 1958–present
- Tourist routes: Virginia Byway

Major junctions
- South end: US 23 / US 58 / US 421 in Clinchport
- SR 72 in Dungannon
- North end: US 58 Alt. in Castlewood

Location
- Country: United States
- State: Virginia
- Counties: Scott, Russell

Highway system
- Virginia Routes; Interstate; US; Primary; Secondary; Byways; History; HOT lanes
| ← I-64 | → I-66 |

State Route 65 (SR 65), formerly State Route 66 (SR 66), is a primary state highway in the U.S. state of Virginia. The state highway runs 34.06 miles (54.81 km) from U.S. Route 23 (US 23), US 58, and US 421 in Clinchport north to US 58 Alternate in Castlewood.

== Route description ==
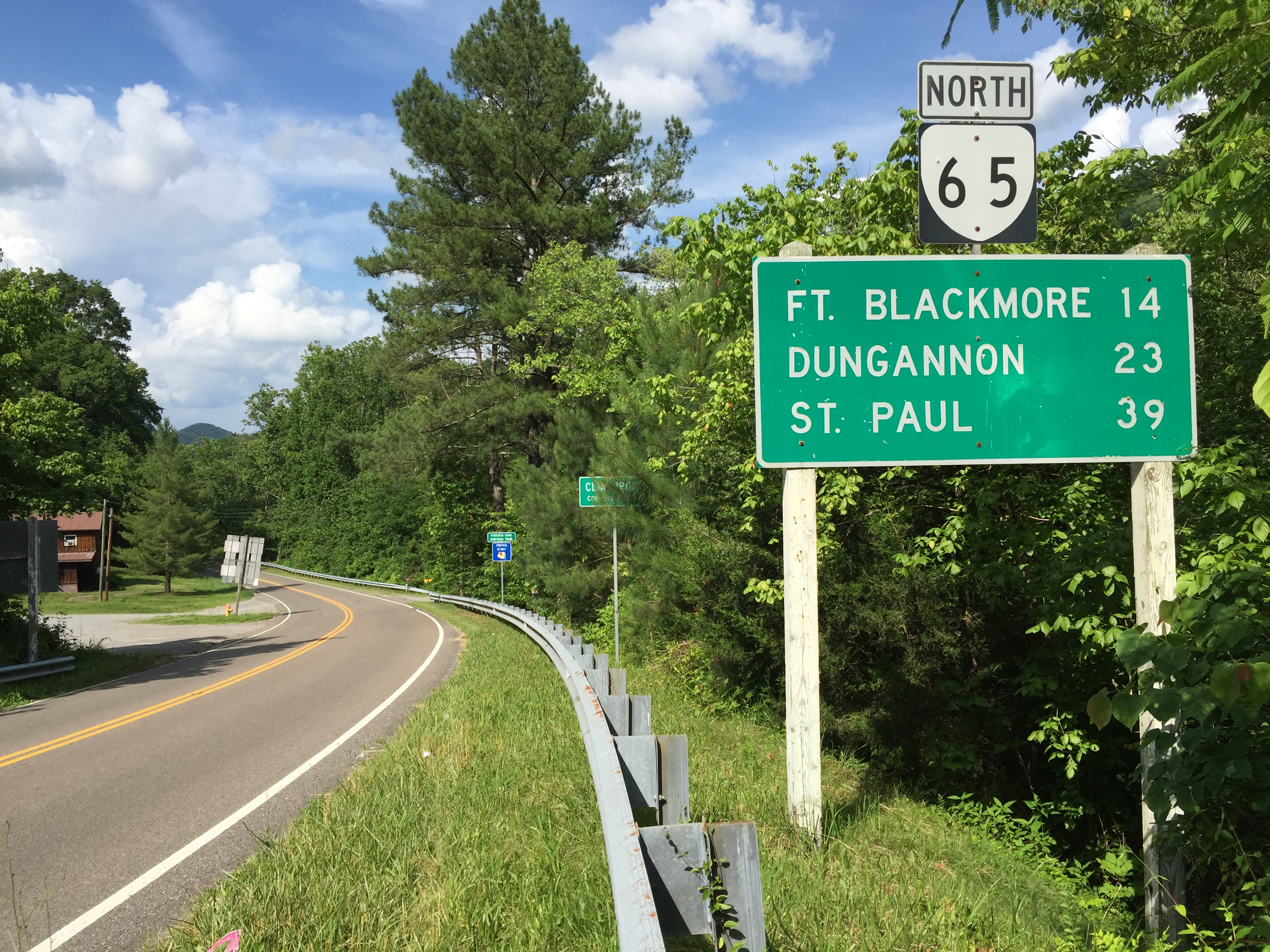
View north at the south end of SR 65 at US 23/US 58/US 421 in Clinchport

SR 65 begins at an intersection with US 23, US 58, and US 421 (Orby Cantrell Highway) just west of the town limit of Clinchport. The state highway heads northeast through the town as 2nd Avenue, which passes under CSX's Kingsport Subdivision. SR 65 becomes Clinch River Highway east of town and parallels the Clinch River and Norfolk Southern Railway's Clinch Valley Division northeast to Fort Blackmore, where the highway begins to run concurrently with SR 72 (Veterans Memorial Highway) to the town of Dungannon. Within the town, SR 72 continues north parallel to the railroad and the Clinch River as Hanging Rock Parkway while SR 65 crosses the river and heads east as Sinking Creek Highway, which follows Sinking Creek across the Scott–Russell county line. The state highway, now named Mew Road, passes through the hamlet of Mew while passing through a broad valley on its way to its northern terminus at US 58 Alternate (Castlewood Road) at Banners Corner in the unincorporated area of Castlewood.

== History ==
State Route 66
- Existed: 1940–1958

SR 65 was designated in March 1958 as a result of the renumbering of the former SR 66 between Clinchport and Castlewood. SR 66 was renumbered due to the impending construction of Interstate 66 in the northern part of the state; the Commonwealth Transportation Board recommended that all routes that shared a number with a proposed Interstate be renumbered. No major routing changes have occurred to the route since its designation.

== Major intersections ==
| County | Location | mi | km | Destinations | Notes |
|---|---|---|---|---|---|
| Scott | | 0.00 | 0.00 | US 23 / US 58 / US 421 – Gate City, Bristol, Duffield | Southern terminus |
| Scott | Fort Blackmore | 17.72 | 28.52 | SR 72 south (Veterans Memorial Highway) / SR 619 (Old Route 72) | Southern end of SR 72 concurrency |
| Scott | Dungannon | 23.11 | 37.19 | SR 72 north (Hanging Rock Parkway) – Coeburn | Northern end of SR 72 concurrency |
| Scott | | | | SR 774 (Long Hollow Road) to SR 71 – Gate City | former SR 72 south |
| Russell | Banners Corner | 34.06 | 54.81 | US 58 Alt. – St. Paul, Norton, Abingdon | Northern terminus |
1.000 mi = 1.609 km; 1.000 km = 0.621 mi: Concurrency terminus

| < SR 123 | District 1 State Routes; 1928–1933 | SR 125 > |
