= Virginia State Route 749 =

Secondary route designation

State Route 749

Route information
- Maintained by VDOT

Location
- Country: United States
- State: Virginia

Highway system
- Virginia Routes; Interstate; US; Primary; Secondary; Byways; History; HOT lanes

State Route 749 (SR 749) in the U.S. state of Virginia is a secondary route designation applied to multiple discontinuous road segments among the many counties. The list below describes the sections in each county that are designated SR 749.

== List ==
| County | Length (mi) | Length (km) | From | Via | To | Notes |
|---|---|---|---|---|---|---|
| Accomack | 0.10 | 0.16 | Dead End | Unnamed road | SR 669 (Hopkins Road) | |
| Albemarle | 0.20 | 0.32 | SR 671 (Davis Shop Road) | Wesley Chapel Road | SR 601 (Free Union Road) | |
| Amherst | 0.60 | 0.97 | SR 686 (Mount Horeb Road) | Hideaway Farm Road | Dead End | |
| Augusta | 1.40 | 2.25 | Dead End | Choushron Lane Burkes Mill Road | SR 646 (Fadley Road) | |
| Bedford | 6.46 | 10.40 | SR 655 (Diamond Hill Road) | Meadors Spur Road Mead Valley Road | SR 746 (Dickerson Mill Road) | |
| Botetourt | 0.66 | 1.06 | FR-54 (Frontage Road) | Dry Branch Road | Dead End | |
| Campbell | 1.00 | 1.61 | SR 40 (Wickliffe Avenue) | Owl Road | SR 618 (Robin Road) | |
| Carroll | 4.12 | 6.63 | US 52 (Poplar Camp Road) | Little Vine Road | SR 100 (Sylvatus Highway) | |
| Chesterfield | 0.11 | 0.18 | SR 10 (Iron Bridge Road) | Womack Road | Dead End | |
| Dinwiddie | 0.04 | 0.06 | FR-82 (Plane Drive) | Unnamed road | Dead End | |
| Fairfax | 1.43 | 2.30 | Cul-de-Sac | Ashburton Avenue Franklin Oaks Drive | Cul-de-Sac | |
| Fauquier | 0.30 | 0.48 | SR 806 (Elk Run Road) | Fernridge Road | SR 767 | |
| Franklin | 0.50 | 0.80 | Dead End | Lawrence Road | SR 652 (Circle Creek Road) | |
| Frederick | 0.17 | 0.27 | Dead End | Quarry Lane | SR 672 (Brucetown Road) | |
| Halifax | 1.20 | 1.93 | Dead End | Woods Creek Lane | SR 360 (Bethel Road) | |
| Hanover | 0.30 | 0.48 | SR 623 (Cedar Lane) | Bazile Road | Dead End | |
| Henry | 1.03 | 1.66 | US 220 Bus | Speedway Road | Clover Road; Martinsville Speedway | |
| James City | 0.26 | 0.42 | Cul-de-Sac | Sherwood Forest Road | SR 606/SR 735 | |
| Loudoun | 0.70 | 1.13 | Dead End | Francis Mill Road | SR 733 (Mountville Road) | |
| Louisa | 1.35 | 2.17 | Dead End | Forest Hill Road | US 33 (Spotswood Trail) | |
| Mecklenburg | 0.30 | 0.48 | Dead End | Glasscock Drive | SR 722 (Carters Point Road) | |
| Montgomery | 0.15 | 0.24 | SR 785 (Catawba Road) | McPherson Road | Cul-de-Sac | |
| Pittsylvania | 0.90 | 1.45 | SR 634 (Blue Ridge Drive) | Cedar Road | SR 665 (Rockford School Road) | |
| Prince William | 0.22 | 0.35 | Dead End | Swan Point Road | Dead End | |
| Pulaski | 0.15 | 0.24 | SR 600 (Belspring Road) | Pine Street | Dead End | |
| Roanoke | 1.19 | 1.92 | Roanoke city limits | Eastland Road | SR 618 (Highland Road) | |
| Rockbridge | 0.80 | 1.29 | SR 648 (Ollie Knick Road) | Unexpected Road | Dead End | |
| Rockingham | 1.50 | 2.41 | SR 730 (Community Center Road) | Lady Bug Road | SR 755 (Windy Cove Road) | |
| Scott | 0.10 | 0.16 | SR 704 (East Charles Valley Road) | Unnamed road | Dead End | |
| Shenandoah | 1.30 | 2.09 | SR 675 (Stoney Creek Road) | Millertown Road | Dead End | |
| Spotsylvania | 0.44 | 0.71 | Dead End | Old Telegraph Road | US 1 (Jefferson Davis Highway) | |
| Stafford | 0.14 | 0.23 | Dead End | Peach Lawn Road | US 17 (Warrenton Road) | |
| Tazewell | 0.07 | 0.11 | Dead End | Denton Street | US 19 | |
| Wise | 0.36 | 0.58 | Dead End | River Road | US 23 Bus | |
| York | 0.49 | 0.79 | SR 603 (Mooretown Road) | Unnamed road | SR 645 (Airport Road) | |
