= Virginia State Route 798 =

Secondary route designation

State Route 798

Route information
- Maintained by VDOT

Location
- Country: United States
- State: Virginia

Highway system
- Virginia Routes; Interstate; US; Primary; Secondary; Byways; History; HOT lanes

State Route 798 (SR 798) in the U.S. state of Virginia is a secondary route designation applied to multiple discontinuous road segments among the many counties. The list below describes the sections in each county that are designated SR 798.

== List ==
County	Length (mi)	Length (km)	From	Via	To	Notes
Accomack	2.45	3.94	SR 766 (Wright Road)	Atlantic Road Mill Dam Road	SR 175 (Chincoteague Road)	
Albemarle	0.02	0.03	SR 691 (Greenwood Road)	Point Grove Road	Dead End	
Amherst	0.34	0.55	SR 1309 (Beechwood Drive/Andrews Drive)	Foreston Manor Drive	SR 675 (Winesap Road)	
Augusta	1.10	1.77	SR 799 (Duke Road/Dalhousie Road)	Zion Church Road	SR 611 (Baynes Road)	
Bedford	1.40	2.25	SR 707 (Lone Oak Crossing)	Eagle Point Road	Dead End	
Botetourt	0.54	0.87	US 11 (Lee Highway)	Reynolds Drive	SR 640 (Brughs Mill Road)	
Campbell	0.25	0.40	SR 615 (Red House Road)	Daniel Road	Dead End	
Carroll	1.20	1.93	Dead End	Troutland Road	SR 702 (Stable Road)	
Chesterfield	0.34	0.55	SR 770	Briarwood Drive	Dead End	
Fairfax	0.71	1.14	SR 193 (Georgetown Pike)	Frontage Road	Dead End	
Fauquier	1.30	2.09	Dead End	Dulins Ford Road Wesley Chapel Road	Dead End	
Franklin	3.16	5.09	SR 903 (Horseshoe Point Road)	Knob Church Road	SR 605 (Henry Road)	
Frederick	0.25	0.40	US 11 (Valley Pike)	Mill Lane	Dead End	
Halifax	0.90	1.45	Dead End	Three M Lane	SR 751 (Storys Creek Road/Piney Grove Road)	
Hanover	1.18	1.90	SR 656 (Mount Herman Road)	Goddins Hill Road	SR 54 (Patrick Henry Road)	
Henry	0.54	0.87	SR 754 (Edgewood Drive)	Old Stage Road	SR 606 (Oak Level Road)	
Loudoun	0.20	0.32	SR 780 (Mossridge Road)	Bowmantown Road	Dead End	
Louisa	0.18	0.29	US 15 (James Madison Highway)	Liberty Terrace	Dead End	
Mecklenburg	0.50	0.80	SR 688 (Skipwith Road)	Moores Drive	Dead End	
Montgomery	0.40	0.64	Dead End	Gantt Drive	US 11 (Radford Road)	
Pittsylvania	2.30	3.70	SR 799 (Climax Road)	Old Red Eye Road	SR 649 (Anderson Mill Road)	
Prince William	0.59	0.95	Dead End	Par Drive	SR 215 (Vint Hill Road)	
Pulaski	2.04	3.28	Dead End	Falling Branch Road	SR 626 (Hazel Hollow Road)	
Roanoke	0.20	0.32	SR 783 (Bennett Springs Road)	Chicasaw Drive	Dead End	
Rockbridge	0.30	0.48	Dead End	Shop Hill Road	SR 781	
Rockingham	6.39	10.28	SR 1419 (Winsinger Road)	Hillyard Drive Tenth Legion Road Arkton Road Huff Trail	Dead End	Gap between segments ending at different points along SR 620
Scott	0.48	0.77	Dead End	Highland Street	SR 799 (Lombard Street)	
Shenandoah	0.12	0.19	Dead End	Creek Lane	SR 720 (Crooked Run Road)	
Stafford	0.18	0.29	Cul-de-Sac	England Run Lane	SR 670 (Sanford Drive)	
Tazewell	0.09	0.14	SR 799 (Byrd Street)	Byrd Street	SR 644 (Abbs Valley Road)	
Washington	3.64	5.86	SR 616 (Caney Valley Road)	Appaloosa Road	SR 622 (Nordyke Road)	
Wise	0.06	0.10	SR 706 (Tacoma Mountain Road)	Tacoma Mountain Road	US 58 Alt	
York	0.11	0.18	Cul-de-Sac	Trivalon Court	SR 756 (Don Juan Circle)	
