= Virginia State Route 785 =

State highway in Virginia, United States

State Route 785

Route information
- Maintained by VDOT

Location
- Country: United States
- State: Virginia

Highway system
- Virginia Routes; Interstate; US; Primary; Secondary; Byways; History; HOT lanes

State Route 785 (SR 785) in the U.S. state of Virginia is a secondary route designation applied to multiple discontinuous road segments among the many counties. The list below describes the sections in each county that are designated SR 785.

== List ==
County	Length (mi)	Length (km)	From	Via	To	Notes
Accomack	0.20	0.32	Dead End	Budd Street	SR 669 (Lee Mont Road)	
Albemarle	1.40	2.25	SR 649 (Proffit Road)	Pritchett Lane	Dead End	
Amherst	0.29	0.47	SR 151 (Patrick Henry Highway)	Blue Ledge Loop	SR 151 (Patrick Henry Highway)	
Augusta	2.90	4.67	SR 608 (Long Meadow Road)	Madrid Road	SR 619 (Purple Cow Road)	
Bedford	0.06	0.10	SR 622 (Everett Road)	Summer Fields Lane	Dead End	
Botetourt	0.15	0.24	SR 751 (Fridley Hill Road)	Huffman Road	Dead End	
Campbell	0.80	1.29	Dead End	Loblolly Road	SR 643 (Lewis Ford Road)	
Carroll	2.12	3.41	US 52 (Poplar Camp Road)	Ridge Road	SR 782 (Round Knob Road)	
Chesterfield	0.32	0.51	SR 10 (West Hundred Road)	Bermuda Triangle Road	SR 975 (Battery Dantzler Road)	
Fairfax	0.10	0.16	SR 673 (Courthouse Road)	Hidden Road	Cul-de-Sac	
Fauquier	0.40	0.64	Dead End	McDonalds Lane	SR 734 (Washwright Road)	
Franklin	4.04	6.50	SR 40 (Franklin Street)	Johnnys Ridge Road	Dead End	
Frederick	0.28	0.45	US 522 (Front Royal Pike)	Longcroft Road	Dead End	
Halifax	0.32	0.51	SR 626 (Clarkton Road)	Depot Lane	Dead End	
Hanover	0.60	0.97	SR 643 (New Ashcake Road)	New Britton Road	SR 653 (Whipporwill Road)	
Henry	0.85	1.37	SR 57 (Fairystone Park Highway)	Linden Road	SR 703 (Ridgewood Road)	
James City	0.36	0.58	Dead End	Melissa Lane	SR 646 (Newman Road)	
Loudoun	0.15	0.24	SR 665 (High Street)	Main Street	SR 662 (Second Street)	
Louisa	0.55	0.89	SR 621 (Peach Grove Road)	North Anna Drive	Cul-de-Sac	
Mecklenburg	0.50	0.80	SR 49	Jonbil Road	Dead End	
Montgomery	10.47	16.85	Blacksburg town limits	Harding Avenue Catawba Road	Roanoke County line	Former path of Virginia State Route 114
Pittsylvania	2.20	3.54	SR 750 (Oxford Road)	Lark Road	SR 605 (Toshes Road)	Gap between segments ending at different points along SR 750
Prince William	0.17	0.27	Dead End	Lakewood Drive	SR 748 (Devils Reach Road)	
Pulaski	0.40	0.64	Dead End	Booker Branch Road	SR 664 (Graysontown Road)	
Roanoke	9.73	15.66	Montgomery County line	Blacksburg Road	SR 311 (Catawba Valley Drive)	Former path of VA 114, along with SR 779 into Botetourt County.
Rockbridge	0.17	0.27	US 11 (Lee Highway)	Sam Houston Way	SR 716 (Timber Ridge Road)	
Rockingham	1.00	1.61	SR 753 (Wengers Mill Road)	Shultztown Road	SR 752/SR 784	
Scott	0.40	0.64	US 23 Bus	Cleveland Avenue	SR 819 (Chestnut Street)	
Shenandoah	0.32	0.51	Dead End	Post Office Road	SR 55 (John Marshall Highway)	
Spotsylvania	0.45	0.72	Poe River Drive	Hunters Lodge Drive	SR 208 (Courthouse Road)	
Tazewell	0.14	0.23	Dead End	Samantha Street	SR 644 (Abbs Valley Road)	
Washington	0.60	0.97	Dead End	Justice Drive	SR 659 (Buffalo Pond Road)	
Wise	0.81	1.30	SR 610 (Powell Valley Road)	Skeens Ridge Road	Dead End	
