= Virginia State Route 776 =

Secondary route designation

State Route 776

Route information
- Maintained by VDOT

Location
- Country: United States
- State: Virginia

Highway system
- Virginia Routes; Interstate; US; Primary; Secondary; Byways; History; HOT lanes

State Route 776 (SR 776) in the U.S. state of Virginia is a secondary route designation applied to multiple discontinuous road segments among the many counties. The list below describes the sections in each county that are designated SR 776.

== List ==
County	Length (mi)	Length (km)	From	Via	To	Notes
Accomack	0.12	0.19	SR 3104 (Pine Street)	Russell Drive	SR 3103 (Cedar Street)	
Albemarle	2.00	3.22	SR 667 (Catterton Road)	Buck Mountain Ford Lane	SR 664 (Markwood Road)	
Amherst	0.50	0.80	SR 622 (Stapleton Road)	Walnut Springs Road	Dead End	
Augusta	1.60	2.57	SR 608 (Battlefield Road)	Hatchery Road	SR 865 (Rockfish Road)	
Bedford	0.10	0.16	US 501 (Lee Jackson Highway)	Old School Lane	SR 604 (Riverside Circle)	
Botetourt	0.23	0.37	Dead End	Church Hill Road	SR 640 (Lithia Road)	
Campbell	1.10	1.77	Dead End	Rock Hill Road	SR 648 (Nowlins Mill Road)	
Carroll	0.60	0.97	Dead End	Merrimac Road	US 58 (Danville Pike)	
Dinwiddie	0.57	0.92	SR 601 (River Road)	Chesdin Lake Road	Dead End	
Fairfax	0.87	1.40	Cul-de-Sac	Colfax Avenue	Alexandria city limits	
Fauquier	3.50	5.63	SR 629 (Bull Run Mountain Road)	Landmark School Road	Loudoun County line	
Franklin	0.49	0.79	Dead End	Roland Branch Road	SR 798 (Knob Church Road)	
Frederick	0.83	1.34	SR 645 (Airport Road)	Bufflick Road	US 522 (Front Royal Pike)	
Halifax	2.65	4.26	SR 734 (Red Bank Road)	Wilborn Road	SR 734 (Red Bank Road)	
Hanover	0.50	0.80	Dead End	King Road	SR 54 (West Patrick Henry Road)	
Henry	0.90	1.45	SR 750 (Old Leaksville Road)	Flanigan Branch Road	Dead End	
James City	0.70	1.13	SR 5000 (Monticello Avenue)	Greensprings Plantation Drive	SR 5 (John Tyler Memorial Highway)	
Loudoun	0.76	1.22	Fauquier County line	Madison Street Landmark School Road	US 50 (John S Mosby Highway)	
Louisa	0.50	0.80	Dead End	Trice Road	SR 601 (Paynes Mill Road)	
Mecklenburg	0.80	1.29	Dead End	Crowder Road	SR 647 (Tolbert Road)	
Montgomery	0.20	0.32	SR 644 (Woodrow Road)	Dabney Road	Dead End	
Pittsylvania	0.60	0.97	SR 751 (Grassland Drive)	Doctor Mease Road	SR 40 (Gretna Road)	
Pulaski	0.20	0.32	Dead End	Riverview Drive	SR 621 (Brooklyn Road)	
Roanoke	0.40	0.64	Dead End	Lewis Road	SR 731 (Rockingham Boulevard/Lewis Road)	
Rockbridge	0.27	0.43	Dead End	Natural Bridge School Road	SR 130 (Wert Faulkner Highway)	
Rockingham	4.10	6.60	SR 613 (Turleytown Road)	Frank Lane Road Morning View Road	SR 613 (Turleytown Road)	
Scott	0.26	0.42	SR 614 (Yuma Road)	Cassard Lane	Dead End	
Shenandoah	0.55	0.89	SR 678 (Fort Valley Road)	Siberts Road	SR 769 (Saint Davids Church Road)	
Spotsylvania	0.26	0.42	Cul-de-Sac	Old Salem Church Road	SR 1118 (Norris Drive)	
Stafford	0.20	0.32	Cul-de-Sac	Apple Blossom Court	SR 721 (Old Concord Road)	
Tazewell	0.10	0.16	Dead End	Tiffany Street	SR 644 (Abbs Valley Road)	
Washington	0.22	0.35	SR 91	Diamond Drive	Dead End	
Wise	0.37	0.60	SR 687	Floyd Road	Dead End	
York	0.12	0.19	US 17 (George Washington Memorial Highway)	Frances Circle	Dead End	
