= Virginia State Route 767 =

Secondary route designation

State Route 767

Route information
- Maintained by VDOT

Location
- Country: United States
- State: Virginia

Highway system
- Virginia Routes; Interstate; US; Primary; Secondary; Byways; History; HOT lanes

State Route 767 (SR 767) in the U.S. state of Virginia is a secondary route designation applied to multiple discontinuous road segments among the many counties. The list below describes the sections in each county that are designated SR 767.

== List ==
County	Length (mi)	Length (km)	From	Via	To	Notes
Accomack	1.09	1.75	SR 641 (Broadway Road)	East Point Road	Dead End	
Albemarle	0.99	1.59	Dead End	Rabbit Valley Road Rabbit Valley Lane Rabbit Valley Road	US 29 (Monacan Trail)	
Amherst	0.10	0.16	Dead End	Logging Camp Lane	SR 630 (Dillard Hill Road)	
Augusta	0.40	0.64	Dead End	Hogshead Lane	SR 613 (Bridgewater Road)	
Bedford	0.45	0.72	Bedford town limits	Fuqua Mill Road	Dead End	
Botetourt	0.99	1.59	US 221/US 460	Blue Ridge Drive	Cul-de-Sac	
Carroll	3.20	5.15	SR 100 (Sylvatus Highway)	Buckhorn Road	SR 753 (Double Cabin Road)	
Chesterfield	0.24	0.39	Dead End	Academy Drive	SR 653 (Courthouse Road)	
Fairfax	0.50	0.80	Dead End	Crestridge Road	SR 643 (Henderson Road)	
Fauquier	1.70	2.74	SR 806 (Elk Run Road)	Tenerife Road	Dead End	
Franklin	6.18	9.95	SR 606 (Hawpatch Road)	Prillaman Switch Road	SR 805 (Field Crest Road)	
Frederick	0.51	0.82	Winchester city limits	Fox Drive	US 522 (Maple Street)	
Halifax	0.55	0.89	Dead End	Brandon Chapel Road	SR 119 (Calvary Road)	
Hanover	0.28	0.45	SR 766 (Malboro Road)	Rockingham Road	SR 768 (Cheraw Road)	
Henry	1.25	2.01	SR 681 (John Baker Road)	Mariah Drive	Dead End	
James City	0.32	0.51	Dead End	North Cove Road	SR 631 (Little Creek Dam Road)	
Loudoun	1.00	1.61	SR 733 (Mountville Road)	Leith Lane	SR 731 (Hibbs Bridge Road)	
Louisa	1.75	2.82	SR 22 (Davis Highway)	School Bus Road	US 33 (Jefferson Highway)	
Mecklenburg	1.40	2.25	SR 732 (Baffalo Creek Road/Buffalo Springs Road)	Buffalo Springs Road	SR 722 (Carters Point Road)	
Montgomery	0.15	0.24	SR 808 (Hightop Road)	Gearhart Road	Dead End	
Pittsylvania	0.65	1.05	Dead End	Vest Road	SR 914 (Boxwood Road)	
Prince William	0.17	0.27	Dead End	Independence Drive	SR 642/SR 2377	
Pulaski	0.10	0.16	SR 766 (Horn Court)	Quesenberry Place	Dead End	
Roanoke	0.50	0.80	Cul-de-Sac	Christopher Drive	SR 688 (Cotton Hill Road)	
Rockingham	1.70	2.74	SR 910 (Fort Lynne Road)	Willow Run Road Hamlet Drive	Dead End	Gap between segments ending at different points along SR 42
Scott	0.49	0.79	SR 1415 (Hillcrest Drive)	Woodland Street Tucker Street	SR 768 (Solon Street)	
Shenandoah	5.32	8.56	SR 42/SR 614	Quicksburg Road	US 11 (Old Valley Pike)	Formerly SR 262
Spotsylvania	0.11	0.18	Dead End	Wildwood Court	SR 635 (Lee Hill School Drive)	
Stafford	0.23	0.37	SR 770 (Wintergreen Lane)	Stafford Stone Drive	SR 648 (Shelton Shop Road)	
Tazewell	0.30	0.48	Dead End	Mico Road	SR 644 (Abbs Valley Road)	
Washington	1.00	1.61	US 11 (Lee Highway)	Deerfield Lane	SR 609 (Hillman Highway)	
Wise	0.55	0.89	Dead End	Unnamed road	US 23	
York	0.15	0.24	Cul-de-Sac	Cove Drive	SR 622 (Seaford Road)	
