= Virginia State Route 772 =

Secondary route designation

State Route 772

Route information
- Maintained by VDOT

Location
- Country: United States
- State: Virginia

Highway system
- Virginia Routes; Interstate; US; Primary; Secondary; Byways; History; HOT lanes

State Route 772 (SR 772) in the U.S. state of Virginia is a secondary route designation applied to multiple discontinuous road segments among the many counties. The list below describes the sections in each county that are designated SR 772.

== List ==
County	Length (mi)	Length (km)	From	Via	To	Notes
Accomack	1.20	1.93	SR 187 (Nelsonia Road)	Hopeland Road	Dead End	
Albemarle	0.37	0.60	Cul-de-Sac	West Drive	SR 771 (Glen Aire Drive)	
Amherst	0.80	1.29	Dead End	Pierce Mountain Road	SR 617 (Thrashers Creek Road)	
Augusta	1.70	2.74	End State Maintenance	Tanner Lane Sulfur Pump Road Chapel Hill Lane	SR 996 (Chapel Hill Lane)	Gap between segments ending at different points along SR 769
Bedford	0.34	0.55	Dead End	Marcus Trail	SR 600 (Peters Creek Road)	
Botetourt	2.15	3.46	US 11 (Lee Highway)	Long Run Road	SR 625 (Mount Joy Road)	
Campbell	0.65	1.05	SR 643 (Lewis Ford Road)	Harper Valley Road	Dead End	
Carroll	0.81	1.30	Dead End	Sugar Creek Road	Wythe County line	
Chesterfield	0.46	0.74	SR 1789 (Southlake Boulevard)	Research Road	US 60 (Midlothian Turnpike)	
Fairfax	0.34	0.55	SR 613 (Beulah Street)	Kathmoor Drive	Dead End	
Fauquier	0.74	1.19	Dead End	Warland Road	SR 732 (John Barton Payne Road)	
Franklin	5.50	8.85	SR 903 (Horseshoe Point Road)	Holley Ridge Road Brown Hill Road Marshall Hill Road	SR 865 (Timberline Road)	
Halifax	1.15	1.85	SR 641 (Lower Liberty Road)	Pierces Trail	Dead End	
Hanover	0.87	1.40	Dead End	Karen Drive	SR 626 (Elmont Road)	
Henry	0.23	0.37	US 58 (A L Philpott Highway)	Moral Hill Drive	Dead End	
James City	0.20	0.32	SR 771 (Halfpenny Drive)	Highfield Drive	Cul-de-Sac	
Loudoun	5.85	9.41	SR 621 (Evergreen Mills Road)	Ryan Road Old Ryan Road Ashburn Village Boulevard	SR 640 (Waxpool Road)	Gap between SR 607 and SR 2298
Louisa	0.75	1.21	Dead End	Breezy Point Road	SR 689 (Moorefield Road)	
Mecklenburg	1.00	1.61	Dead End	LeGrand Road	SR 703 (Sullivan Road)	
Montgomery	0.30	0.48	Dead End	Harmony Road	SR 639 (Mount Pleasant Road)	
Pittsylvania	0.50	0.80	Dead End	Daniel Lane	SR 718 (Dry Fork Road)	
Prince William	1.02	1.64	SR 652 (Fitzwater Drive)	Marsteller Drive Marsteller Road	SR 646 (Aden Road)	
Pulaski	0.10	0.16	SR 673 (Estension Street)	Billy Avenue	Dead End	
Roanoke	0.20	0.32	SR 641 (Texas Hollow Road)	Joe Carrol Road	Dead End	
Rockbridge	0.03	0.05	SR 130 (Wert Faulkner Highway)	Stoner Hollow Road	SR 688 (Stoner Hollow Road)	
Rockingham	5.72	9.21	Dead End	Sparkling Springs Road Greenmount Road	SR 42 (Harpine Highway)	Gap between segments ending at different points along SR 613
Scott	1.60	2.57	Cul-de-Sac	Frayley Avenue Unnamed road	Dead End	
Shenandoah	0.90	1.45	Dead End	Ramsey Road	SR 678 (Fort Valley Road)	
Stafford	0.29	0.47	SR 707 (Dent Road)	Little Rocky Run Lane	Cul-de-Sac	
Tazewell	0.73	1.17	Russell County line	Reedy Road	SR 670 (Mill Creek Road)	
Washington	0.22	0.35	SR 80 (Hayters Gap Road)	Riverridge Church Road	SR 80 (Hayters Gap Road)	
Wise	0.32	0.51	SR 671 (North Fork Road)	Unnamed road	Dead End	
York	0.21	0.34	SR 713 (Walker Mill Road)	Carrs Hill Road	SR 771 (Lorac Road)	
