= Virginia State Route 71 =

State highway in western Virginia, US

State Route 71

Route information
- Maintained by VDOT
- Length: 35.82 mi (57.65 km)
- Existed: July 1, 1933–present
- Tourist routes: Virginia Byway

Major junctions
- South end: US 23 Bus. / US 58 Bus. / US 421 Bus. in Gate City
- US 58 Alt. at Dickensonville
- North end: US 19 Bus. in Lebanon

Location
- Country: United States
- State: Virginia
- Counties: Scott, Russell

Highway system
- Virginia Routes; Interstate; US; Primary; Secondary; Byways; History; HOT lanes
← SR 70	→ SR 72

State Route 71 (SR 71) is a primary state highway in the southwest part of the U.S. state of Virginia. It runs from Gate City northeast to Lebanon, mostly through river valleys. Despite running more east–west than north–south, it is signed north–south; it parallels the similarly-oriented U.S. Route 11 and Interstate 81.

== Route description ==
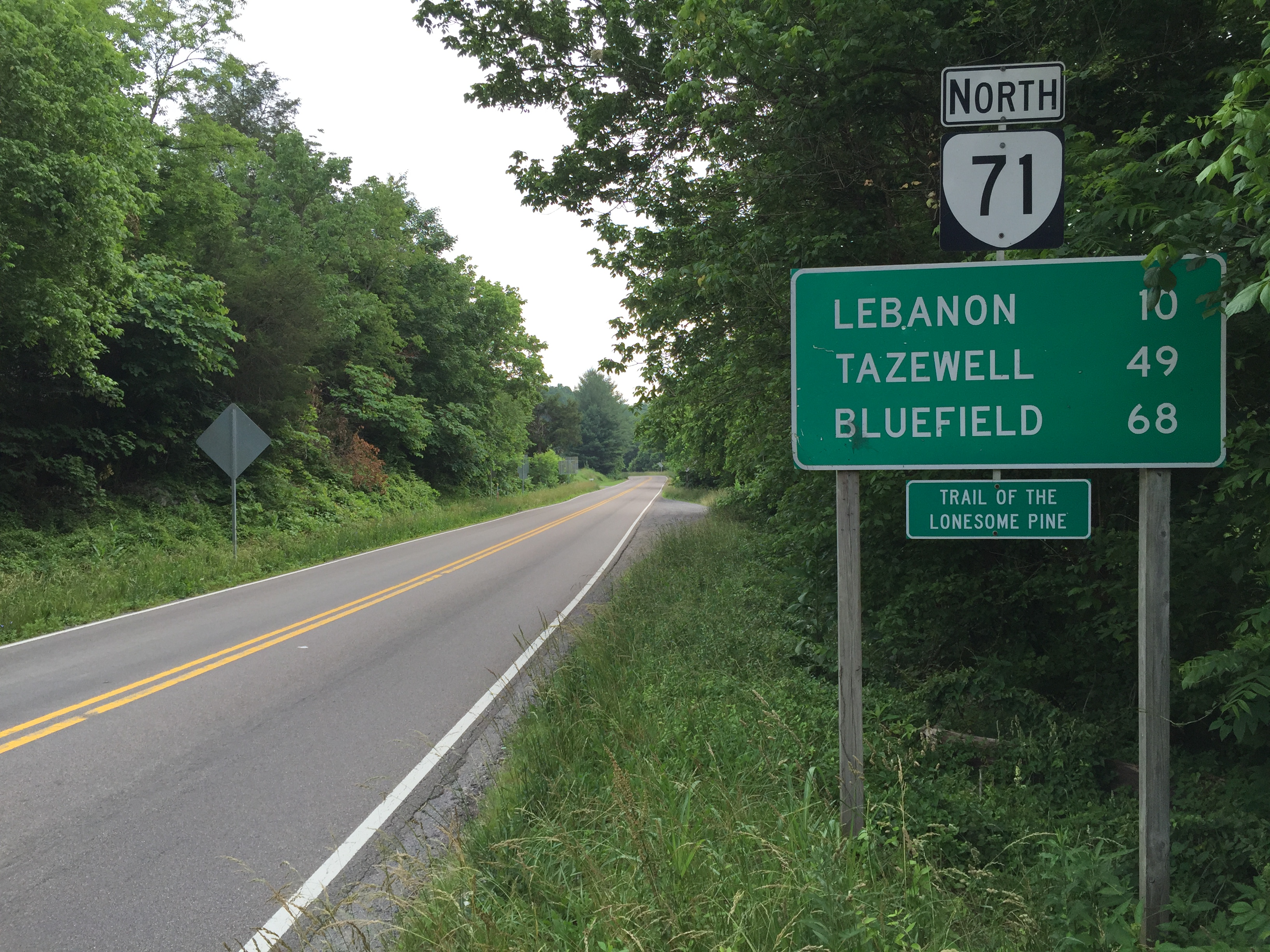
View north along SR 71 at US 58 Alt. in Dickensonville

SR 71 begins in Gate City, Scott County where U.S. Routes 23/58/421 Business leaves Jackson Street to head southeast through Moccasin Gap. It runs in a general east-northeasterly direction, soon joining Big Moccasin Creek. The road and creek run through the Moccasin Valley past Slabtown (where SR 72 begins) to Snowflake, where SR 71 leaves the creek to cross Moccasin Ridge. SR 71 leaves the ridge at Dorton Fort and enters the valley formed by Copper Creek, running past Nickelsville.

SR 71 continues in Russell County in a general east-northeasterly direction past Grassy Creek to U.S. Route 58 Alternate at Parsonage. The routes overlap to Dickensonville, where SR 71 splits, continuing to follow Copper Creek to near its source, passing over a small summit, and then following small creeks to its end at US 19 Bus. in Lebanon.

== History ==
Most of present SR 71, from SR 11 (now US 58 Alt.) at Parsonage southwest to about five miles (8.0 km) from Gate City, was added to the state highway system in 1928 as SR 107; the final five miles (8.0 km) were added the next year. In the 1933 renumbering, SR 107 was renumbered SR 71 and extended east from Parsonage along former SR 11 (renumbered SR 64 then) to Dickensonville, replacing the former SR 110 from there to US 19 at Hansonville. As part of the 1940 renumbering, which coordinated numbers with adjacent states, SR 64 and SR 71 were swapped east of Dickensonville, giving SR 71 its present terminus at Lebanon.

== Major intersections ==
County	Location	mi	km	Destinations	Notes
Scott	Gate City	0.00	0.00	US 23 Bus. / US 58 Bus. / US 421 Bus. (West Jackson Street / Kane Street)	Southern terminus
Scott	Gate City			SR 72 north (Veterans Memorial Highway)	Southern terminus of SR 72
Scott				SR 613 (Big Moccasin Road)	to former SR 74 east
Scott				SR 774 (Long Hollow Road) to SR 65 – Dungannon	former SR 72 north
Russell	Parsonage	25.61	41.22	US 58 Alt. west – St. Paul, Norton	Southern end of US 58 Alt. concurrency
Russell	Dickensonville	27.07	43.56	US 58 Alt. east – Hansonville, Abingdon	Northern end of US 58 Alt. concurrency
Russell	Lebanon	35.82	57.65	US 19 Bus. (Main Street) – Bluefield, Abingdon, Bristol	Northern terminus
1.000 mi = 1.609 km; 1.000 km = 0.621 mi: Concurrency terminus

< SR 106	District 1 State Routes; 1928–1933	SR 108 >
