= Virginia State Route 769 =

Secondary route designation

State Route 769

Route information
- Maintained by VDOT

Location
- Country: United States
- State: Virginia

Highway system
- Virginia Routes; Interstate; US; Primary; Secondary; Byways; History; HOT lanes

State Route 769 (SR 769) in the U.S. state of Virginia is a secondary route designation applied to multiple discontinuous road segments among the many counties. The list below describes the sections in each county that are designated SR 769.

== List ==
County	Length (mi)	Length (km)	From	Via	To	Notes
Accomack	1.20	1.93	US 13 (Lankford Highway)	Beartown Road	SR 679 (Metompkin Road)	
Albemarle	1.90	3.06	Dead End	Rocky Hollow Road Beam Road	Dead End	Gap between segments ending at different points along SR 20
Amherst	0.22	0.35	Dead End	Bucks Hollow Road	US 60 (Lexington Turnpike)	
Augusta	1.94	3.12	SR 256 (Weyers Cave Road)	Snow Flake Mill Road	SR 865 (Rockfish Road)	
Bedford	1.60	2.57	SR 671 (Centerville Road)	Screechum Hollow Road	Dead End	
Campbell	0.48	0.77	SR 859 (Powtan Road)	Beechwood Drive	US 460 Bus	
Carroll	4.34	6.98	US 52 (Poplar Camp Road)	Peacock Drive	SR 749 (Little Vine Road)	
Chesterfield	0.31	0.50	SR 4840 (Rivers Bend Boulevard)	Sunset Boulevard	Dead End	
Fairfax	0.75	1.21	SR 698 (Cedar Lane)	Oak Street	SR 852 (Providence Street)	
Fauquier	0.35	0.56	SR 651 (Freemans Ford Road)	Beales Branch Lane	Dead End	
Franklin	0.32	0.51	SR 770 (Old Henry Road)	Larkin Branch Road	Dead End	
Halifax	1.10	1.77	Dead End	New Bethel Road	SR 751 (Piney Grove Road)	
Hanover	0.88	1.42	SR 768 (Cheraw Road)	Anderson Court	End Loop	
Henry	0.16	0.26	Dead End	Azalea Street	SR 903 (Henry Street)	
James City	0.32	0.51	Cul-de-Sac	Barlows Run Road Barlows Road	Cul-de-Sac	
Loudoun	2.37	3.81	SR 704 (Harmony Church Road)	Woodburn Road	SR 699 (Dry Mill Road)	
Louisa	0.05	0.08	SR 614/SR 652	Poindexter Lane	Dead End	
Mecklenburg	0.60	0.97	Dead End	Marengo Village Road	SR 618 (Marengo Road)	
Montgomery	0.25	0.40	SR 825 (Great Valley Road)	Great Valley Road	Dead End	
Pittsylvania	0.23	0.37	SR 41 (Franklin Turnpike)	Early Road	SR 41 (Franklin Turnpike)	
Prince William	1.15	1.85	Dead End	Lake Drive	SR 1562 (Pine Street)	
Pulaski	0.49	0.79	Dead End	McAdam Crossing Drive	SR 99 (Count Pulaski Drive)	
Roanoke	0.45	0.72	US 11 (West Main Street)	Harwick Drive	Dead End	
Rockbridge	0.24	0.39	Dead End	Beans River Bottom Road	SR 631 (Big Spring Drive)	
Rockingham	2.70	4.35	SR 752 (Snapps Creek Road)	Thompson Road Skidmore Road	SR 765 (Amberly Road)	Gap between segments ending at different points along SR 768
Scott	0.21	0.34	US 23 Bus	Bishop Street	SR 71 (Jackson Street)	
Shenandoah	7.34	11.81	SR 675 (Stoney Creek Road)	Saint Davids Church Road	SR 678 (Fort Valley Road)	
Stafford	0.05	0.08	Cul-de-Sac	Corduroy Court	SR 767 (Stafford Stone Drive)	
Tazewell	0.21	0.34	SR 660 (Loop Road)	Grove Street	Dead End	
Washington	0.30	0.48	US 58 (Jeb Stuart Highway)	Stella Drive	US 58 (Jeb Stuart Highway)	
Wise	0.09	0.14	SR 734 (Riverside Drive)	Riverside Circle	SR 735 (Riverside Circle)	
York	0.16	0.26	Dead End	Sunset Drive	SR 718 (Back Creek Drive)	
