= Virginia State Route 681 =

State highway in Virginia, United States

State Route 681

Route information
- Maintained by VDOT

Location
- Country: United States
- State: Virginia

Highway system
- Virginia Routes; Interstate; US; Primary; Secondary; Byways; History; HOT lanes

State Route 681 (SR 681) in the U.S. state of Virginia is a secondary route designation applied to multiple discontinuous road segments among the many counties. The list below describes the sections in each county that are designated SR 681.

== List ==
County	Length (mi)	Length (km)	From	Via	To	Notes
Accomack	5.77	9.29	SR 187 (Shoremain Drive)	Mason Road Littleton Road Kegotank Road	Dead End	Gap between segments ending at different points along US 13 Gap between segments ending at different points along SR 187
Albemarle	0.60	0.97	SR 637 (Dick Woods Road)	Ragged Mountain Road	Dead End	
Alleghany	0.25	0.40	SR 680 (Clearwater Drive)	Parkview Avenue	SR 687 (Jackson River Road)	
Amelia	11.81	19.01	US 360 (Patrick Henry Highway)	Pridesville Road Clementown Road	Powhatan County line	
Amherst	1.75	2.82	Dead End	Mays Street Seminole Drive	SR 833 (Old Wright Shop Road)	
Appomattox	2.80	4.51	SR 635 (Redfields Road)	Cedar Tree Road	SR 630 (Old Evergreen Road)	
Augusta	2.35	3.78	SR 602 (Walker Creek Road)	Mount Harmon Road	SR 252 (Middlebrook Road)	
Bath	0.21	0.34	SR 647 (Perry Hollow Road)	Mountain View Road	Dead End	
Bedford	3.80	6.12	SR 684 (Rocky Ford Road)	Magnolia Drive Cobbs Mountain Road	SR 680 (Patterson Mill Road)	Gap between US 460 and SR 831
Botetourt	9.56	15.39	SR 630 (Springwood Road)	Poor Farm Road Mary Alice Road Zion Hill Road Mount Moriah Road	US 220 (Botetourt Road)	Gap between segments ending at different points along SR 635 Gap between segments ending at different points along SR 655
Brunswick	4.30	6.92	US 58 (Governor Harrison Parkway)	Pleasant Grove Road	SR 644 (Grandy Road)	
Buchanan	1.60	2.57	SR 600 (Hurricane Road)	Rockhouse Road	SR 623 (Council Mountain Road)	
Buckingham	0.50	0.80	SR 636 (Francisco Road)	Concord Mountain Road	Dead End	
Campbell	3.39	5.46	SR 624 (Timberlake Drive)	Old Plantation Road Sunburst Road	SR 622 (Waterlick Road)	
Caroline	1.75	2.82	US 17 (Tidewater Trail)	Snowden Road	Dead End	
Carroll	1.80	2.90	SR 682 (Winchester Drive)	Quarry Road	SR 677 (Thunder Ridge Road)	
Charlotte	1.30	2.09	SR 672 (Midway Road)	Moon Road	Dead End	
Chesterfield	0.93	1.50	SR 10 (Iron Bridge Road)	Old Hundred Road	SR 625 (Branders Bridge Road)	
Clarke	0.07	0.11	Dead End	Osborne Street	SR 616 (Church Street)	
Craig	0.31	0.50	SR 614 (Hawkins Lane)	Unnamed road	Dead End	
Culpeper	1.45	2.33	Dead End	Jacobs Ford Road	SR 3	
Cumberland	1.00	1.61	Dead End	Bransford Road	SR 654 (Frenchs Store Road)	
Dickenson	1.62	2.61	SR 63 (Dante Mountain Road)	Unnamed road	Dead End	
Dinwiddie	1.80	2.90	Sussex County line	Black Branch Road	SR 665 (Mortar Branch Road/Black Mill Road)	
Essex	0.61	0.98	US 17 (Tidewater Trail)	Spindle Shop Road	US 17 (Tidewater Trail)	
Fairfax	4.04	6.50	SR 743 (Colvin Run Road)	Walker Road	SR 603 (Beach Mill Road)	
Fauquier	9.70	15.61	SR 732 (John Payne Road)	Cliff Mills Road Holtzclaw Road Wales Road	Dead End	Gap between SR 691 and US 211 Gap between segments ending at different points along SR 802
Floyd	9.70	15.61	US 221 (Floyd Highway)	Franklin Pike	SR 640/Blue Ridge Parkway	
Fluvanna	0.02	0.03	SR 601 (Venable Road)	Venable Road	SR 653 (Three Chopt Road)	
Franklin	5.08	8.18	SR 116	Coopers Cove Road	SR 635 (Edwardsville Road)	
Frederick	9.94	16.00	US 522 (Frederick Pike)	Chestnut Grove Road Hunting Ridge Road Three Creeks Road Glengary Road	WV 45	Gap between SR 690 and SR 671
Giles	0.20	0.32	SR 100 (Pulaski Giles Turnpike)	Brooks Road	Dead End	
Goochland	2.00	3.22	Dead End	Payne Road	SR 605 (Shannon Hill Road)	
Grayson	2.25	3.62	SR 711 (Gold Hill Road)	Rose Hill Road	SR 601 (Old Bridle Creek Road)	Gap between segments ending at different points along US 58
Greensville	0.55	0.89	SR 640/SR 1020	Everetts Lake Road	SR 619 (Purdy Road)	
Halifax	5.50	8.85	SR 659 (River Road)	Union Church Road	SR 360 (Mountain Road)	
Hanover	1.80	2.90	SR 658 (Green Bay Road)	Ancient Acres Road	Dead End	
Henry	3.48	5.60	SR 687 (Stones Dairy Road)	Smith Road John Baker Road	SR 683 (The Great Road)	Gap between segments ending at different points along SR 679
Isle of Wight	7.74	12.46	SR 620 (Broadwater Road)	Strawberry Plains Road Raynor Road Comet Road Stallings Creek Road	SR 626 (Mill Swamp Road)	Gap between segments ending at different points along SR 637 Gap between segments ending at different points along SR 680
James City	0.62	1.00	Dead End	Sandy Bay Road	SR 615 (Ironbound Road)	
King and Queen	0.28	0.45	SR 14 (The Trail)	Allens Circle	SR 14 (The Trail)	
King George	0.30	0.48	SR 3 (Kings Highway)	Rollens Fork Road	SR 627 (Wilmont Road)	
King William	0.31	0.50	Dead End	Hybla Farm Road	SR 629 (Jacks Creek Road)	
Lancaster	1.14	1.83	Dead End	Monaskon Road	SR 354 (River Road)	
Lee	1.00	1.61	Tennessee state line	Unnamed road	SR 695	
Loudoun	5.52	8.88	SR 698 (Old Wheatland Road)	Milltown Road Orrison Road Slater Road	SR 663 (Downey Mill Road)	Gap between segments ending at different points along SR 673 Gap between dead ends
Louisa	0.30	0.48	Dead End	Woodley Lane	SR 618 (Fredericks Halls Road)	
Lunenburg	0.10	0.16	SR 680 (Crymes Road)	Cut Thru Road	SR 40 (Lunenburg County Road)	
Mathews	0.53	0.85	SR 626 (Hallieford Road)	Burton Point Road	Dead End	
Mecklenburg	1.80	2.90	SR 633 (Scotts Crossroads)	Honeytree Road	SR 634 (Traffic Road)	
Middlesex	0.63	1.01	SR 33 (General Puller Highway)	Silver Ridge Road	Dead End	
Montgomery	1.60	2.57	Blacksburg town limits	Nellies Cave Road	SR 1260 (Woodland Hills Drive)	
Nelson	2.42	3.89	SR 666 (Woodson Road)	Pigeon Hill Road	SR 680 (Pharsalia Road)	
New Kent	0.15	0.24	Cul-de-Sac	Warrior Road	SR 675 (Arrowhead Road)	
Northampton	0.50	0.80	SR 609 (Franktown Road)	Hospital Avenue	SR 606 (Rogers Drive)	
Northumberland	0.75	1.21	Dead End	Burnette Lane	SR 201 (Courthouse Road)	
Nottoway	1.69	2.72	Dead End	Hickory Grove Road	SR 610 (Willis Road)	
Orange	1.00	1.61	SR 620 (Horseshoe Road)	Windsor Road	Dead End	
Page	0.60	0.97	SR 673 (Fleeburg Loop)	Fleeburg Loop	SR 603 (Fleeburg Road)	
Patrick	2.51	4.04	SR 8 (Patrick Avenue)	Commerce Street	SR 727 (Wayside Park Road)	
Pittsylvania	3.30	5.31	SR 682 (McCormick Road)	Mountain Road	SR 640 (Riceville Road)	
Powhatan	2.72	4.38	Amelia County line	Clement Town Road	SR 13 (Old Buckingham Road)	
Prince Edward	0.47	0.76	SR 671 (County Line Road)	Baker Mountain Plant Road	Dead End	
Prince William	3.28	5.28	SR 601 (Waterfall Road)	Antioch Road	I-66/FR-288	
Pulaski	0.26	0.42	Dead End	Sifford Road	SR 600 (Belspring Road)	
Rappahannock	2.63	4.23	Dead End	Rolling Road	SR 231 (F T Valley Road)	
Richmond	0.40	0.64	Dead End	Front Street	SR 642 (Sharps Road)	
Roanoke	0.19	0.31	SR 720 (Colonial Avenue)	Ogden Road	Roanoke city limits	
Rockbridge	0.79	1.27	SR 631 (Furrs Mill Road)	Unnamed road	Dead End	
Rockingham	3.30	5.31	SR 682 (Friedens Church Road)	Whitesel Church Road	SR 679 (Pleasant Valley Road)	
Russell	0.10	0.16	SR 608 (Straight Hollow Road)	Unnamed road	Dead End	
Scott	4.27	6.87	SR 680 (Twin Springs Road)	Gillenwater Chapel Road	SR 774 (Long Hollow Road)	
Shenandoah	10.87	17.49	SR 679 (Rittenour Road)	Osceola Road	SR 652 (Jadwyn Road)	Gap between segments ending at different points along SR 42 Gap between segments ending at different points along SR 604
Smyth	0.50	0.80	US 11 (Lee Highway)	Unnamed road	SR 617 (Davis Valley Road)	
Southampton	1.40	2.25	SR 680	Beale Road	SR 734 (Handsom Road)	
Spotsylvania	0.54	0.87	US 1 Bus (Lafayette Boulevard)	Lorraine Avenue	SR 1370 (Ann Davis Drive)	
Stafford	0.61	0.98	SR 621 (Marlborough Road)	Indian Point Road	Dead End	
Sussex	10.31	16.59	SR 619 (Walkers Mill Road)	Concord Sappony Road Unnamed road	Dinwiddie County line	
Tazewell	0.50	0.80	SR 643 (Brushfork Road)	Prater Hollow Road	West Virginia state line	
Warren	0.24	0.39	Front Royal town limits	Luray Avenue	Dead End	
Washington	2.18	3.51	SR 611 (Providence Road)	Woodland Hills Road	Abingdon town limits	
Westmoreland	0.72	1.16	Dead End	Lyells Street	SR 3 (Kings Highway)	
Wise	1.07	1.72	SR 74/US 58 Alt	Unnamed road	Dead End	
Wythe	0.82	1.32	Dead End	Brushy Mountain Road	SR 680 (Black Lick Road)	
York	0.10	0.16	SR 600 (Big Bethel Road)	Bethany Terrace	Cul-de-Sac	
