= Virginia State Route 680 =

State highway in Virginia, United States

State Route 680

Route information
- Maintained by VDOT

Location
- Country: United States
- State: Virginia

Highway system
- Virginia Routes; Interstate; US; Primary; Secondary; Byways; History; HOT lanes

State Route 680 (SR 680) in the U.S. state of Virginia is a secondary route designation applied to multiple discontinuous road segments among the many counties. The list below describes the sections in each county that are designated SR 680.

== List ==
County	Length (mi)	Length (km)	From	Via	To	Notes
Accomack	4.10	6.60	SR 681 (Mason Road)	Berry Road Gargatha Landing Road	Dead End	Gap between segments ending at different points along US 13
Albemarle	4.18	6.73	US 250 (Ivy Road)	Browns Gap Turnpike	SR 810 (White Hall Road)	
Alleghany	0.60	0.97	SR 713 (Gilpin Avenue)	Clearwater Drive	SR 687 (Jackson River Road)	
Amelia	0.45	0.72	Dead End	Maxey Lane	SR 614 (Dennisville Road)	
Amherst	0.19	0.31	Dead End	Daniels Place	Dead End	
Appomattox	0.57	0.92	Cul-de-Sac	Fairway Place	SR 643 (Country Club Road)	
Augusta	2.36	3.80	SR 696 (Coffman Road)	Burketown Road Burks Mill Road	US 11 (Lee Highway)	
Bath	0.73	1.17	US 220 (Ingalls Boulevard)	Chimney Run Road	Dead End	
Bedford	16.83	27.09	SR 746 (Dickerson Mill Road)	Wheatland Road Patterson Mill Road Sheep Creek Road Murrells Gap Road Smyrna Hill Road Hutchens Road	Dead End	Gap between segments ending at different points along SR 695 Gap between segments ending at different points along SR 693
Bland	0.89	1.43	SR 615/SR 620	Brushy Mountain Road	Cul-de-Sac	
Botetourt	0.10	0.16	SR 630 (Springwood Road)	Copps Hill Road	Dead End	
Brunswick	0.10	0.16	Dead End	Charlie Hope Place	SR 644 (Grandy Road)	
Buchanan	4.80	7.72	US 460	Contrary Creek Road	SR 638 (Dismall River Road)	
Buckingham	0.30	0.48	US 15 (James Madison Highway)	Hidden Springs Road	Dead End	
Campbell	6.22	10.01	SR 738 (English Tavern Road)	Suburban Road Poor House Road	Dead End	Gap between segments ending at different points along US 501
Caroline	0.85	1.37	Dead End	Rattletrap Road	SR 603 (County Line Church Road)	
Carroll	2.34	3.77	SR 670 (Snake Creek Road)	Buffalo View Road Crooked Oak Road	US 58 (Danville Pike)	
Charles City	0.42	0.68	Cul-de-Sac	Old Holley Road	SR 603 (Old Union Road)	
Charlotte	1.41	2.27	US 15 Bus/US 360 Bus	Crymes Orchard Road	SR 652 (Briery Road)	
Chesterfield	0.19	0.31	Dead End	Old Bermuda Hundred Road	SR 618 (Old Bermuda Hundred Road)	
Clarke	0.50	0.80	Dead End	Smallwood Lane	US 340 (Lord Fairfax Highway)	
Craig	0.06	0.10	SR 659	Unnamed road	SR 615 (Craigs Creek Road)	
Culpeper	0.95	1.53	Dead End	Mitchell Ford Road	SR 647 (Batna Road)	
Cumberland	0.80	1.29	Dead End	Coffeys Road	SR 45 (Cumberland Road)	
Dickenson	1.10	1.77	SR 83	Unnamed road	Dead End	
Dinwiddie	3.20	5.15	SR 681 (Black Branch Road)	Troublefield Road	SR 618 (Halligan Park Road)	
Essex	0.66	1.06	SR 616 (River Stretch Road/Grandview Drive)	River Place	Dead End	
Fairfax	2.66	4.28	SR 606 (Baron Cameron Avenue)	Stuart Road Shaker Woods Road	SR 604 (Sugarland Road)	
Fauquier	0.70	1.13	SR 678 (Waterloo Road)	Lower Waterloo Road	SR 678	
Floyd	4.30	6.92	SR 860 (Shooting Creek Road)	Starbuck Road Smartsview Road	SR 888 (Silver Leaf Road)/SR 661	
Fluvanna	1.20	1.93	SR 639 (Long Acre Road)	Middle Fork Road	Dead End	
Franklin	2.31	3.72	SR 678 (Farmington Road)	Edwardsville Road	SR 635 (Edwardsville Road/Mount Airy Road)	
Frederick	0.80	1.29	US 50 (Northwestern Pike)	Newlins Hill Road	Dead End	
Giles	0.26	0.42	SR 640 (Thomas Drive)	Tannery Road	Dead End	
Gloucester	1.44	2.32	SR 3 (John Clayton Memorial Highway)	Exchange Lane	Dead End	
Goochland	0.88	1.42	Dead End	Youngstown Road	SR 6 (River Road)	
Grayson	3.30	5.31	SR 711 (Fox Ridge Road)	Little Fox Creek Road Grubbs Chapel Road	Dead End	Gap between segments ending at different points along SR 601
Greene	0.11	0.18	US 33 (Spotswood Trail)	Pinewood Court	Cul-de-Sac	
Greensville	0.83	1.34	SR 608 (Wyatts Mill Road)	Skyes Lane	Dead End	
Halifax	4.40	7.08	SR 683 (Oak Level Road)	Pleasant Grove Road	SR 360 (Mountain Road)	
Hanover	5.12	8.24	SR 631 (Old Ridge Road)	Shiloh Church Road Woodson Mill Road	SR 658 (Tyler Station Road)	
Henry	3.61	5.81	SR 681 (John Baker Road)	Columbus Drive	SR 57 Alt	
Isle of Wight	5.81	9.35	SR 621 (Mill Swamp Road)	Stallings Creek Drive Magnet Drive	SR 620 (Foursquare Road)	
James City	0.58	0.93	SR 614 (Greensprings Road)	Four-H Club Road	SR 31 (Jamestown Road)	
King and Queen	0.49	0.79	Cul-de-Sac	Hockley Lane	SR 605 (York River Road)	
King George	0.32	0.51	SR 625 (Salem Church Road)	Index Lane	SR 3 (Kings Highway)	
King William	0.18	0.29	SR 30 (King William Road)	Garlick Road	Dead End	
Lancaster	1.05	1.69	Dead End	Teague Road	SR 354 (River Road)	
Lee	3.50	5.63	SR 682 (Giles Hollow Road)	Speaks Branch Road Pleasant View Road	SR 667 (Old Nursary Road)	
Loudoun	2.30	3.70	SR 682 (Householder Road)	Axline Road	SR 690 (Mountain Road)	
Louisa	0.50	0.80	Dead End	Haden Lane	SR 650 (Pottiesville Road)	
Lunenburg	6.85	11.02	SR 690 (Davis Low Ground Road)	Crymes Road	SR 662 (Nutbush Road)	
Madison	1.40	2.25	US 29 (Seminole Trail)	Gate Road	Dead End	
Mathews	0.49	0.79	Dead End	Henrys Road	SR 637 (Gwynnsville Road)	
Mecklenburg	2.90	4.67	SR 671 (Country Club Drive)	Sweetwater Lane	SR 600 (Draper Road)	
Middlesex	0.74	1.19	SR 602 (Old Virginia Street)	Burrells Marina Road	Dead End	
Nelson	12.13	19.52	SR 151 (Patrick Henry Highway)	Tan Yard Road Pharsalia Road Cub Creek Road	SR 664 (Beech Grove Road)	
New Kent	0.12	0.19	SR 612 (Tunstall Road)	Griffith Circle	SR 612 (Tunstall Road)	
Northampton	2.17	3.49	US 13 Bus (Bayside Road)	Cherrystone Road Townfield Drive	End State Maintenance	
Northumberland	1.00	1.61	SR 624 (Lewisetta Road)	Cherry Point Road	Dead End	
Nottoway	0.53	0.85	SR 619 (West Creek Road)	Ingleside Road	Dead End	
Orange	0.11	0.18	Dead End	Morningside Drive	SR 647 (Old Gordonsville Road)	
Page	0.80	1.29	Dead End	Unnamed road	SR 611 (Farmview Road)	
Patrick	15.71	25.28	SR 653 (Ayers Orchard Road)	South Mayo Drive Spring Road Pleasant View Drive Pole Bridge Road	SR 57 (Fairystone Park Highway)	Gap between segments ending at different points along SR 687
Pittsylvania	4.79	7.71	SR 57 (Halifax Road)	Chanceys Store Road Church Road	SR 640 (Riceville Road)	Gap between segments ending at different points along SR 666
Prince Edward	0.34	0.55	SR 626 (Pin Oak Road)	Allens Mill Road	Dead End	
Prince William	0.95	1.53	SR 600 (Mountain Road)	Jackson Hollow Road	SR 601 (Waterfall Road)	
Pulaski	0.10	0.16	SR 637 (Montague Road)	Hall Farm Lane	Dead End	
Rappahannock	0.79	1.27	Dead End	Dennis Road	SR 626 (Scrabble Road)	
Richmond	0.40	0.64	Dead End	Smith Lane	SR 637 (Piney Grove Road)	
Roanoke	0.24	0.39	SR 777 (Fort Lewis Church Road)	Little Bear Road	Dead End	
Rockbridge	3.10	4.99	US 11 (Lee Highway)	Falling Spring Road	SR 608 (Forge Road)	
Rockingham	2.40	3.86	SR 682 (Friedens Church Road)	Oak Ridge Road	SR 253 (Port Republic Road)	
Russell	0.70	1.13	SR 678 (Lower Copper Creek Road)	Carney Boyd Lane	SR 71	
Scott	12.58	20.25	Dead End	Crutch Creek Road Unnamed road Hickory Corners Lane Unnamed road Twin Springs Road	SR 71	Gap between segments ending at different points along SR 653 Gap between segments ending at different points along SR 65 Gap between segments ending at different points along SR 671
Shenandoah	3.25	5.23	SR 623 (Back Road)	Coffmantown Road	SR 42 (Senedo Road)	Gap between segments ending at different points along SR 679
Smyth	0.50	0.80	SR 679 (Dutton Road)	Shaw Lane	Dead End	
Southampton	9.80	15.77	North Carolina state line	Sun Beam Road Unnamed road	SR 674 (Rochelle Swamp Road)	Gap between segments ending at different points along SR 679 Gap between segments ending at different points along SR 671
Spotsylvania	2.20	3.54	SR 664 (Granite Springs Road)	Granite Springs Road	SR 601 (Lawyers Road)	
Stafford	0.29	0.47	Dead End	Leonard Street Leonard Road Leonard Street	SR 3 (Kings Highway)	
Surry	0.40	0.64	Cul-de-Sac	Commerce Drive	SR 10 (Colonial Trail)	
Sussex	0.24	0.39	SR 701 (Railroad Avenue)	Wilson Avenue	SR 603 (Church Street)	
Tazewell	0.99	1.59	US 19	Irson Road Hurt Road	US 19	Gap between segments ending at different points along US 19
Warren	0.31	0.50	SR 619 (Rivermont Drive)	Russ Johnson Road	SR 619	
Washington	2.07	3.33	Bristol city limits	Wagner Road	SR 641 (Camp Ground Road)	
Westmoreland	0.94	1.51	SR 612 (Coles Point Road)	Salisbury Park Road	Dead End	
Wise	2.76	4.44	Wise town limits	Unnamed road	SR 644	Gap between segments ending at different points along SR 640
Wythe	7.38	11.88	I-81/SR 90	Black Lick Road	US 52 (Stoney Fork Road)	
York	0.25	0.40	SR 649 (Rich Road)	Rich Road	US 17 (George Washington Memorial Highway)	
