= Virginia State Route 13 =

State highway in central Virginia, US

State Route 13
- Old Buckingham Road

Route information
- Maintained by VDOT
- Length: 24.08 mi (38.75 km)
- Existed: 1935–present

Major junctions
- West end: US 60 / SR 45 in Cumberland
- East end: US 60 in Plain View

Location
- Country: United States
- State: Virginia
- Counties: Cumberland, Powhatan

Highway system
- Virginia Routes; Interstate; US; Primary; Secondary; Byways; History; HOT lanes
← US 13	→ SR 14

State Route 13 (SR 13) is a primary state highway in the U.S. state of Virginia. Known as Old Buckingham Road, the state highway runs 24.08 miles (38.75 km) from U.S. Route 60 and SR 45 in Cumberland east to US 60 in Plain View. SR 13 parallels US 60 to the south through eastern Cumberland County and western Powhatan County and passes through the latter county's seat of Powhatan. The state highway is the only state-numbered highway in Virginia that shares a number with a U.S. Highway but does not form a state-numbered extension of that U.S. Highway. SR 13's number comes from being a segment of the original cross-state SR 13 in 1918; that highway included portions of modern US 60. In 1933, US 60 was shifted to its present corridor between Buena Vista and Richmond, replacing SR 13. Two years later, SR 13 was assigned to Old Buckingham Road when US 60 was moved to its present alignment from Cumberland to east of Powhatan.

== Route description ==
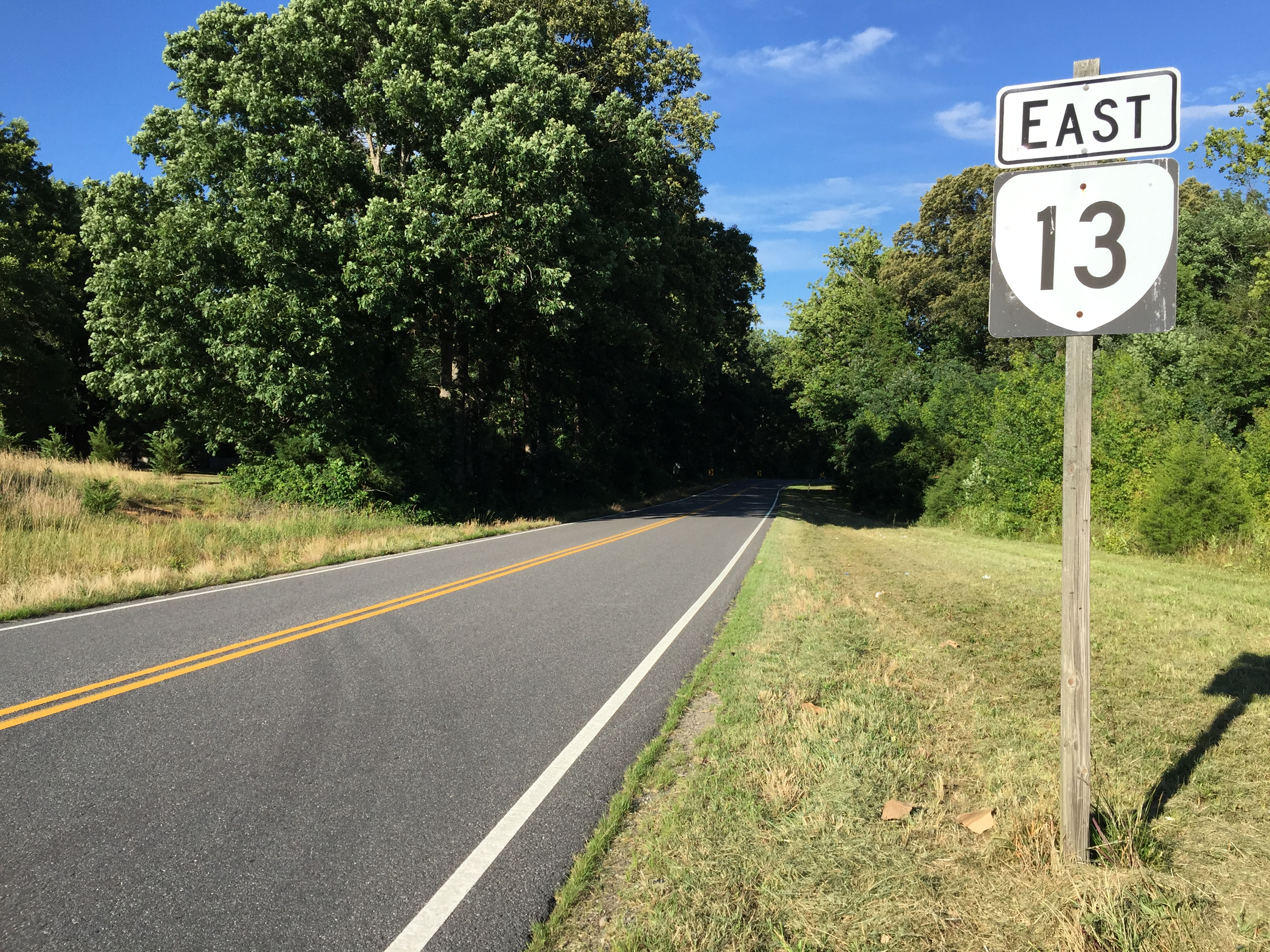
View east along SR 13 at SR 682 just east of Cumberland

SR 13 begins at an intersection with James Anderson Highway, a four-lane divided highway that carries US 60 and SR 45, in Cumberland. The state highway heads southeast as a two-lane undivided road and crosses the Cumberland–Powhatan county line. SR 13 continues through the communities of Tobaccoville, Ballsville, and Belona. At the hamlet of Macon, the state highway veers north, then turns east at an intersection with SR 1002 (Emmanuel Church Road). SR 1002 heads north a short distance to US 522's southern terminus at US 60. SR 13 briefly runs adjacent to US 60, then veers away through the county seat of Powhatan. At the county courthouse, the state highway meets the southern end of SR 300, which provides another connection to US 60. SR 13 passes through Worshams before reaching its eastern terminus at US 60 (James Anderson Highway) at Plain View.

== History ==
SR 13 is the remnant of a much longer route. It was part of the initial system defined in 1918, running from the West Virginia state line via Lexington, Lynchburg, Farmville, and Richmond to State Route 8 near Tappahannock. This corridor is now generally U.S. Route 60, U.S. Route 501, U.S. Route 460, State Route 45, U.S. Route 60, and U.S. Route 360. This was entirely concurrent with other routes west of Farmville - State Route 14 west of Lynchburg and State Route 10 from Lynchburg to Farmville - and so in the 1923 renumbering it was truncated to Farmville-Tappahannock.

The road from southeast of Warsaw to Callao was added to the state highway system in 1924, and the next year it was connected to the rest of SR 13 by the addition of the road from Tappahannock to Warsaw.

To the west, a short piece of road from State Route 2 at Sprouses Corner west to Buckingham was added in 1923, and later that year it was assigned the State Route 322 designation as a spur of State Route 32 (formerly SR 2). Disconnected extensions of SR 322 were added in 1924 on both sides of Amherst and in 1925 in both directions from both segments. Further extensions of SR 322 were planned in 1926, but, later that year, SR 322 was renumbered as an extension of SR 13; the short piece from Cumberland southwest to Farmville became State Route 133 (renumbered State Route 310 in the 1928 renumbering, and part of State Route 45 in the 1933 renumbering).

The road from Buena Vista west to State Route 14 at McCormick's Gate (now the junction of U.S. Route 60 and State Route 608/Pathfinder Drive) was added in 1924. This became part of the SR 13 extension, but in 1928, SR 14 was rerouted to pass through Buena Vista and use that piece of road, and thus SR 13 was truncated to Buena Vista. In 1927 and 1928, the remaining pieces of SR 13 were added, making SR 13 a continuous route from SR 14 in Buena Vista east to Callao.

Until the 1933 renumbering, no significant portions of SR 13 were concurrent with U.S. Routes. In 1933, U.S. Route 60 was shifted north from the Lynchburg-Burkeville alignment (now U.S. Route 501, U.S. Route 460, and U.S. Route 360) to replace SR 13 from Buena Vista to Richmond, and U.S. Route 360 was designated over SR 13 from Richmond to Callao; thus SR 13 was completely eliminated in 1933.

However, a new cutoff between Cumberland and east of Powhatan was planned as State Route 13 Alternate. A short piece west of Powhatan had been added to the state highway system in 1932 as part of State Route 46 (now State Route 684 in that area), but the main part was added in 1933 and 1934 (specifically as US 60 in the latter year). By 1935, the new US 60 was complete, and the old route reverted to its old designation - State Route 13.

== Major intersections ==
County	Location	mi	km	Destinations	Notes
Cumberland		0.00	0.00	US 60 / SR 45 (Anderson Highway) – Cumberland CH, Richmond	Western terminus
Cumberland	Grays Siding			SR 682 (Northfield Road)	former SR 45 north
Powhatan	Tobaccoville			SR 681 south (Clementown Road) – Amelia	former SR 38 east (earlier SR 49 south)
Powhatan				SR 1002 (Emmanuel Church Road) to US 522 / US 60	former SR 49 north
Powhatan	Powhatan	21.71	34.94	Courthouse Tavern Lane (SR 300 north)	Southern terminus of SR 300
Powhatan	Plain View	24.08	38.75	US 60 (Anderson Highway) – Lexington, Richmond, Virginia Beach	Eastern terminus
1.000 mi = 1.609 km; 1.000 km = 0.621 mi

== See also ==
Spurs of State Route 13 between 1923 and 1928

- State Route 131, St. Stephens Church to King and Queen Court House, now part of State Route 14
- State Route 132, Tobaccoville to Amelia Court House, now State Route 681
- State Route 133, Cumberland to Farmville, now part of State Route 45

< SR 12	Two‑digit State Routes; 1923-1933	SR 14 >
< SR 321	Spurs of SR 32; 1923–1928	SR 323 >
