= Virginia State Route 201 =

State highway in eastern Virginia, US

State Route 201

Route information
- Maintained by VDOT
- Length: 16.17 mi (26.02 km)
- Existed: 1933–present

Major junctions
- South end: SR 354 near Mollusk
- SR 3 at Lively
- North end: US 360 in Heathsville

Location
- Country: United States
- State: Virginia
- Counties: Lancaster, Northumberland

Highway system
- Virginia Routes; Interstate; US; Primary; Secondary; Byways; History; HOT lanes
← SR 200	→ SR 202

State Route 201 (SR 201) is a primary state highway in the U.S. state of Virginia. The state highway runs 16.17 miles (26.02 km) from SR 354 near Mollusk north to U.S. Route 360 (US 360) in Heathsville. SR 201 connects western Lancaster County and, indirectly, the county seat of Lancaster with the Northumberland County seat of Heathsville.

== Route description ==
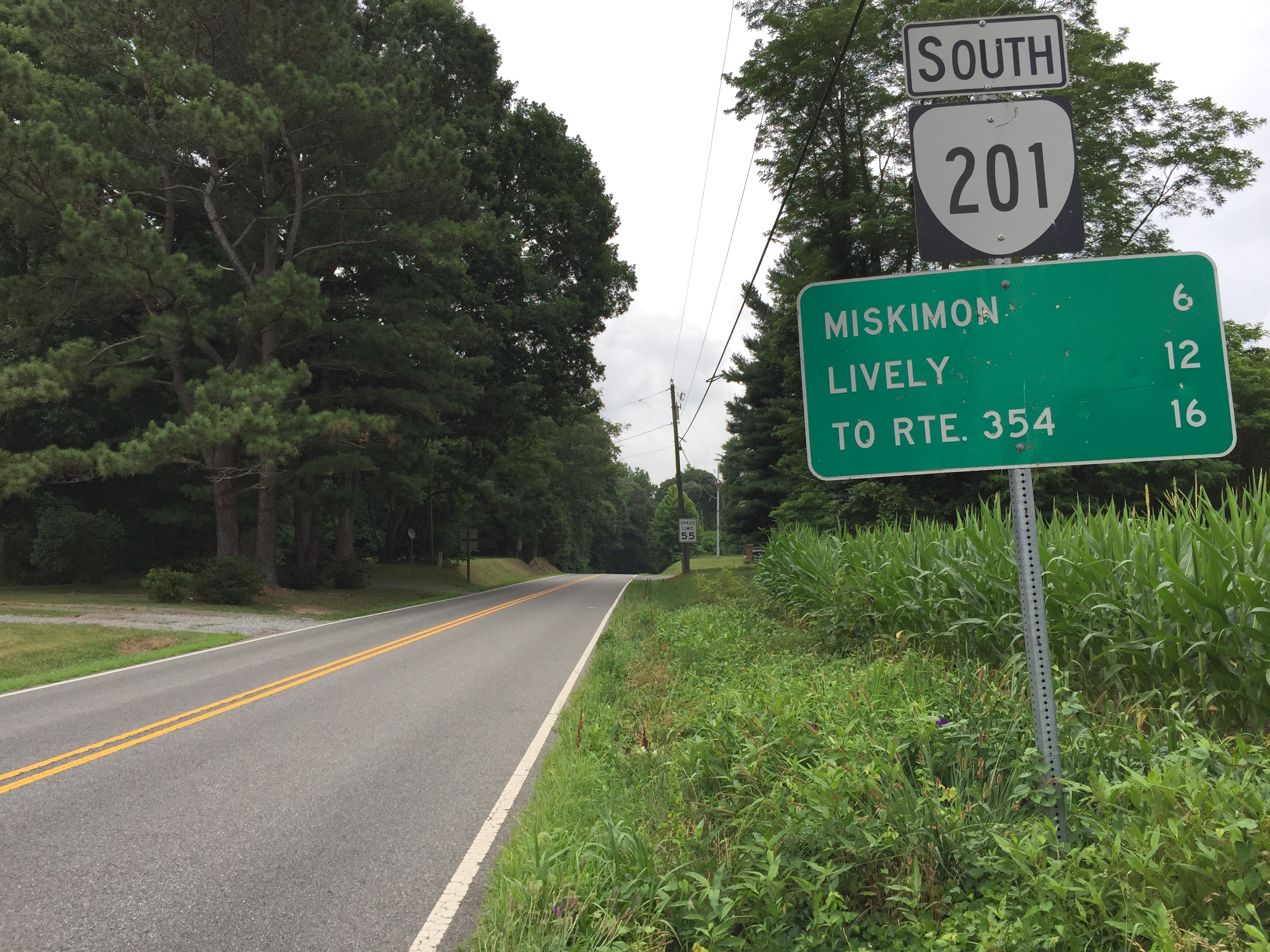
View south at the north end of SR 201 at US 360 in Heathsville

SR 201 begins at an intersection with SR 354 (River Road) near the hamlet of Mollusk. The state highway heads northeast as White Chapel Road and crosses Little Branch, a tributary of the Western Branch of the Corrotoman River. SR 201 intersects SR 3 (Historyland Highway) in the hamlet of Lively and crosses the Belwood Swamp on its way to McNeals Corner. There, the state highway turns north onto Court House Road. Courthouse Road heads south as SR 600 toward the Lancaster County seat of Lancaster; the 0.11-mile (0.18 km) long curved spur between SR 201 and SR 600 is SR 201Y. SR 201 has a right-angle turn south of Miskimon; from there to Miskimon, the state highway runs on top of the Lancaster–Northumberland county line. The county line is also the height of land between the Corrotoman River drainage, which empties into the Rappahannock River, and the watershed of the Great Wicomico River, which flows directly into the Chesapeake Bay. SR 201 fully enters Northumberland County at Miskimon and has another sharp turn at Howland. The state highway crosses the two streams that form the Great Wicomico River—Bush Mill Stream and Crabbs Mill Stream—before reaching its northern terminus at US 360 (Northumberland Highway) in Heathsville.

== Major intersections ==
County	Location	mi	km	Destinations	Notes
Lancaster		0.00	0.00	SR 354 (River Road) – Belle Isle State Park	Southern terminus
Lancaster	Lively	3.22	5.18	SR 3 (Mary Ball Road) – Fredericksburg, Kilmarnock	
Lancaster	McNeals Corner	5.96	9.59	SR 600 (Courthouse Road) – Lancaster CH	former SR 3 east
Northumberland	Heathsville	16.17	26.02	US 360 (Northumberland Highway) – Richmond, Reedville	Northern terminus
1.000 mi = 1.609 km; 1.000 km = 0.621 mi

< SR 605	District 6 State Routes; 1928–1933	SR 607 >
< SR 627	District 6 State Routes; 1928–1933	SR 629 >
