= Virginia State Route 682 =

Secondary state highway in Virginia, United States

State Route 682

Route information
- Maintained by VDOT

Location
- Country: United States
- State: Virginia

Highway system
- Virginia Routes; Interstate; US; Primary; Secondary; Byways; History; HOT lanes

State Route 682 (SR 682) in the U.S. state of Virginia is a secondary route designation applied to multiple discontinuous road segments among the many counties. The list below describes the sections in each county that are designated SR 682.

== List ==
County	Length (mi)	Length (km)	From	Via	To	Notes
Accomack	1.80	2.90	Dead End	Anns Cove Road	SR 658 (Big Road)	Gap between segments ending at different points along SR 675
Albemarle	4.36	7.02	SR 637 (Dick Woods Road)	Broad Axe Road	US 250 (Ivy Road)	
Alleghany	0.20	0.32	SR 680 (Clearwater Drive)	Waller Avenue	SR 687 (Jackson River Road)	
Amelia	2.09	3.36	Nottoway County line	Sweathouse Creek Road	SR 153 (Military Road)	
Amherst	0.90	1.45	US 29 Bus (Amherst Highway)	Woodys Lake Road	Dead End	
Appomattox	0.80	1.29	US 60 (Anderson Highway)	Mockingbird Lane	SR 722 (Redbird Drive)	
Augusta	8.26	13.29	SR 601 (Estaline Valley Road)	Troxel Gap Road McKinley Road	SR 252 (Middlebrook Road)	
Bath	0.30	0.48	Dead End	Charger Lane	US 220 (Ingalls Boulevard)	
Bedford	5.25	8.45	SR 680 (Sheep Creek Road/Patterson Mill Road)	Kelso Mill Road Woods Road	SR 640 (Forbes Mill Road)	Gap between segments ending at different points along SR 43
Botetourt	2.24	3.60	SR 655 (Old Fincastle Road)	Pauley Street Sugar Tree Hollow Drive Austin Lane	Dead End	
Brunswick	2.30	3.70	SR 642 (Poor House Road)	Holly Road Persimmon Hill Road	SR 630 (Sturgeon Road)	Gap between segments ending at different points along SR 606
Buchanan	0.30	0.48	Dead End	Mavisdale Hill Road	Deed End	Gap between segments ending at different points along SR 624
Buckingham	1.10	1.77	SR 631 (Buffalo Road)	Hollibrook Road	SR 617 (Copper Mine Road)	
Campbell	20.38	32.80	SR 43 (Bedford Highway)	Leesville Road	Lynchburg city limits	
Caroline	1.20	1.93	Dead End	Beasley Lane	US 301 (Richmond Turnpike)	
Carroll	4.57	7.35	US 52 (Fancy Gap Highway)	Winchester Drive	SR 608 (Lightning Ridge Road)	
Charlotte	0.10	0.16	SR 649 (Fearstown Road)	Womacks Loop Road	SR 40 (Patrick Henry Highway)	
Chesterfield	0.15	0.24	SR 655 (Beach Road)	Old Beach Road	SR 655 (Beach Road)	
Craig	0.13	0.21	SR 615 (Craigs Creek Road)	Unnamed road	Dead End	
Culpeper	2.80	4.51	SR 610 (Eleys Ford Road)	Fields Mill Road	SR 620 (Edwards Shop Road)	
Cumberland	0.50	0.80	SR 13 (Old Buckingham Road)	Northfield Road	US 60 (Anderson Highway)/SR 45 (Cartersville Road)	
Dickenson	1.95	3.14	Dead End	Unnamed road	Dead End	
Dinwiddie	0.70	1.13	SR 609 (Old Stage Road)	Ole Bole Road	SR 670 (Shady Lane)	
Essex	0.55	0.89	Dead End	Gibsons Road	SR 719 (Yorkers Swamp Road)	
Fairfax	2.13	3.43	SR 681 (Walker Road)	Arnon Chapel Road Weant Drive	Dead End	
Fauquier	1.30	2.09	Dead End	Black Snake Lane	SR 802 (Springs Road)	
Floyd	6.10	9.82	SR 680 (Starbuck Road)	Paradise Lane Harvestwood Road Spanglers Mill Road	SR 686 (Moore Road)	Gap between segments ending at different points along SR 681
Fluvanna	0.80	1.29	Dead End	Little Mountain Road	SR 649 (Central Plains Road)	
Franklin	2.20	3.54	SR 116 (Jubal Early Highway)	Mountain Valley Road	SR 681 (Coopers Cove Road)	
Frederick	1.60	2.57	SR 608 (Hunting Ridge Road)	Glaize Orchard Road	SR 671 (Green Spring Road)	
Giles	0.20	0.32	SR 625 (Walnut Road)	Goodwins Ferry Road	SR 730 (Eggleston Road)	
Gloucester	1.10	1.77	Dead End	Hermitage Lane	SR 616 (Clay Bank Road)	
Grayson	1.85	2.98	US 58 (Wilson Highway)	Saddle Creek Road	Dead End	
Greensville	0.12	0.19	US 58 (Courtland Road)	Airport Drive	Dead End	
Halifax	4.23	6.81	SR 678 (Grubby Road)	Old Grubby Road Berry Hill Road	South Boston town limits	Gap between segments ending at different points along SR 659
Hanover	2.00	3.22	SR 715 (Beaver Dam Road)	Ben Gayle Road	Dead End	
Henry	3.98	6.41	Dead End	River Road	US 220	
Isle of Wight	4.80	7.72	SR 681 (Raynor Road)	White House Road Unnamed road	SR 680 (Magnet Drive)	
James City	1.48	2.38	Dead End	Neck-O-Land Road	SR 31 (Jamestown Road)	
King and Queen	0.15	0.24	US 360 (Richmond Highway)	Unnamed road	Dead End	
King George	1.00	1.61	SR 642 (Fitzhugh Lane)	Eagles Nest Lane	Dead End	
King William	0.14	0.23	Cul-de-Sac	Tidy Cat Road	SR 613 (Dunluce Road)	
Lancaster	2.23	3.59	SR 354 (River Road)	Millenbeck Road	Dead End	
Lee	6.50	10.46	Tennessee state line	Unnamed road Giles Hollow Road	US 58	
Loudoun	4.65	7.48	SR 690 (Mountain Road)	Britain Road Householder Road Rodeffer Road Compher Road	Dead End	Gap between segments ending at different points along SR 850 Gap between segments ending at different points along SR 287 gap between segments ending at different points along SR 681
Louisa	0.10	0.16	US 33 (Louisa Road)	Danne Road	Dead End	
Lunenburg	1.50	2.41	SR 40 (Lunenburg County Road)	Arvins Store Road	SR 626 (Double Bridges Road)	
Madison	0.85	1.37	SR 231 (Blue Ridge Turnpike)	Longshot Lane	Dead End	
Mathews	0.87	1.40	SR 643 (Haven Beach Road)	Whites Creek Lane	Dead End	
Mecklenburg	5.77	9.29	SR 49	Finneywood Road	SR 47	
Middlesex	0.32	0.51	SR 640 (Waterview Road)	Parrotts Creek Lane	Dead End	
Montgomery	0.45	0.72	SR 753 (Old Town Road)	New Town Road	Dead End	
Nelson	1.00	1.61	SR 56 (Crabtree Falls Highway)	Harpers Creek Lane	Dead End	
Northampton	1.10	1.77	Dead End	Jocabia Lane	US 13 (Lankford Highway)	
Northumberland	0.80	1.29	Dead End	Owl Point Road	SR 601 (Dodlyt Road/Bush Mill Road)	
Nottoway	0.40	0.64	SR 612 (Old Richmond Road)	Sweathouse Creek Road	Amelia County line	
Orange	0.55	0.89	Dead End	Little Egypt Road	SR 638 (Mountain Track Road)	
Page	3.69	5.94	Shenandoah National Park boundary	Tanners Ridge Road	SR 624 (Pine Grove Road)	
Patrick	4.00	6.44	SR 680 (South Mayo Drive)	Big A School Road	SR 631 (Wayside Road)	
Pittsylvania	2.40	3.86	SR 686 (Markham Road)	McCormick Road	SR 640 (Java Road)	
Prince Edward	2.10	3.38	Charlotte County line	Junction Canal Road	SR 668 (Bell Road)	
Prince William	4.18	6.73	SR 681 (Antioch Road)	Thoroughfare Road	SR 703 (Old Carolina Road)	Gap between FR-287 and SR 55
Pulaski	0.85	1.37	SR 611 (Newbern Road)	Newbern Road	SR 100 (Cleburne Boulevard)	
Richmond	0.09	0.14	Dead End	Farnham Landing Road	SR 608 (Farnham Creek Road)	
Roanoke	2.09	3.36	SR 720 (Colonial Avenue)	Manassas Drive Garst Mill Road	Roanoke city limits	
Rockbridge	0.40	0.64	SR 610 (Plank Road)	Tally Ho Lane	Dead End	
Rockingham	4.30	6.92	SR 257 (Friedens Church Road)	Friedens Church Road	SR 276 (Cross Keys Road)	
Russell	7.20	11.59	SR 609 (High Point Road)	Castle Run Road Brick Church Circle	SR 65 (Mew Road)	
Scott	11.82	19.02	SR 613 (Big Moccasin Road)	Dean Hollow Road Bethel Road Unnamed road Bush Hill Road Falls Creek Road	SR 774 (Long Hollow Road)	Gap between segments ending at different points along SR 71 Gap between segments ending at different points along SR 681
Shenandoah	5.35	8.61	SR 691 (Judge Rye Road)	Readus Road	SR 605 (Saint Luke Road)	Gap between segments ending at different points along SR 42 Gap between segments ending at different points along SR 680
Smyth	2.00	3.22	SR 615 (Rocky Hollow Road)	Knight Road	US 11 (Lee Highway)	
Southampton	2.30	3.70	SR 683 (Mary Hunt Road)	Woodland Road	SR 680	
Spotsylvania	0.95	1.53	SR 611 (Windy Acres Lane)	Parker Lane	Dead End	
Stafford	1.58	2.54	SR 606 (Ferry Road)	Colebrook Road	SR 604 (McCarty Road)	
Sussex	0.17	0.27	SR 705 (Railroad Avenue)	Knight Street	SR 732 (King Street)	
Tazewell	0.30	0.48	Dead End	Ruble Hill Road	SR 664 (Slade Hollow Road)	
Warren	0.43	0.69	Dead End	Poe Drive	SR 55 (Strasburg Road)	
Westmoreland	0.87	1.40	SR 664 (Bristol Mine Road)	Ebb Tide Drive	Dead End	
Wise	1.07	1.72	SR 829 (Sportsman Road)	Unnamed road	SR 644 (Pole Bridge Road)	Gap between dead ends
Wythe	1.00	1.61	US 11 (Lee Highway)	Unnamed road	SR 617 (Dutton Hollow Road)	
York	0.49	0.79	SR 606 (Running Man Trail)	Lambs Creek Drive	Cul-de-Sac	Gap between a cul-de-sac and SR 684
