= Mollusk (disambiguation) =

Mollusks or molluscs are invertebrate animals that make up the phylum Mollusca.

Mollusk may also refer to:

- Mollusk, Virginia, a community in Lancaster County
- The Mollusk, a 1997 album by rock band Ween
