= Virginia State Route 643 =

State highway in Virginia, United States

State Route 643

Route information
- Maintained by VDOT

Location
- Country: United States
- State: Virginia

Highway system
- Virginia Routes; Interstate; US; Primary; Secondary; Byways; History; HOT lanes

State Route 643 (SR 643) in the U.S. state of Virginia is a secondary route designation applied to multiple discontinuous road segments among the many counties. The list below describes the sections in each county that are designated SR 643.

== List ==
County	Length (mi)	Length (km)	From	Via	To	Notes
Accomack	1.69	2.72	SR 638 (Cashville Road)	Bailey Neck Drive	Dead End	
Albemarle	4.70	7.56	SR 743 (Earlysville Road)	Rio Mills Road Polo Grounds Road	SR 649 (Proffitt Road)	
Alleghany	0.04	0.06	SR 645 (Westwood Drive)	Robert Street	US 60 (Midland Trail)	
Amelia	3.35	5.39	SR 616 (Genito Road)	Bent Creek Road	SR 681 (Clementown Road)	
Amherst	20.35	32.75	SR 610 (Pera Road)	Cedar Creek Road Ashebey Woods Road Wagon Trail Road Unnamed road Kenmore Road	US 29 Bus	Gap between dead ends Gap between segments ending at different points along SR 635
Appomattox	2.78	4.47	SR 691 (Pumping Staton Road)	Country Club Road	SR 719 (Purdum Mill Road)	
Augusta	1.26	2.03	SR 649 (Round Hill Drive)	Augusta Farms Road	SR 635 (Kindig Road)	
Bath	0.45	0.72	Dead End	Campbell Hollow Road	SR 39 (Mountain Valley Road)	
Bedford	21.14	34.02	SR 43 (Peaks Road)	Jopling Road Otterville Road Cifax Road Brookhill Road Bellevue Road	SR 811 (Thomas Jefferson Road)	Gap between segments ending at different points along SR 122
Bland	0.40	0.64	Dead End	Grassy Branch Drive	US 52 (South Scenic Highway)	
Botetourt	4.60	7.40	Dead End	Goode Lane Mountain Valley Road Bobblets Gap Road	SR 625 (Pico Road)	Gap between segments ending at different points along SR 640
Brunswick	8.17	13.15	SR 689 (Big Buck Road)/SR 729 (New Hope Road)	Flat Rock Road	US 1 (Boydton Plank Road)	
Buchanan	16.26	26.17	SR 83	Hurley Roads	Kentucky state line	
Buckingham	0.50	0.80	Dead End	Glover Road	SR 640 (Andersonville Road)	
Campbell	8.50	13.68	SR 917 (Railview Road)	Carver Lane Lewis Ford Road	SR 615 (Red House Road)	
Caroline	4.00	6.44	SR 721 (Sparta Road)	File Road	SR 644 (Bagby Road)	
Carroll	4.35	7.00	SR 641 (Doe Run Road)	Rome Drive Oakwood Road Excelsior School Road	SR 648 (Excelsior School Road/Windover Road)	Gap between segments ending at different points along SR 640
Charles City	0.02	0.03	SR 644 (Courthouse Road)	The Crossover	SR 5 (John Tyler Memorial Highway)	
Charlotte	2.27	3.65	SR 746 (Scuffletown Road)	Brick House Road	SR 642 (Mossingford Road)	
Chesterfield	2.41	3.88	SR 651 (Belmont Road)	Turner Road Jessup Road	SR 2266 (Upp Street)	
Clarke	1.30	2.09	SR 7 (Harry Flood Byrd Highway)	Retreat Road	Dead End	
Craig	1.35	2.17	Dead End	Howard Hannah Road	SR 615	
Culpeper	4.57	7.35	SR 633 (Norman Road)	North Merrimac Road South Merrimac Road	SR 603 (White Shop Road)	
Cumberland	2.50	4.02	SR 600 (Stoney Point Road)	Motley Mill Road	SR 13 (Old Buckingham Road)	
Dickenson	7.08	11.39	SR 652 (Dr Ralph Stanley Highway)	Unnamed road Carter Stanley Highway Unnamed road	SR 63 (Dante Mountain Road)	
Dinwiddie	3.20	5.15	SR 40 (Darvills Road)	Zilles Road	SR 642 (Grubby Road)	
Essex	0.10	0.16	SR 629 (Battery Road)	Battery Road	SR 624 (Essex Church Road)	
Fairfax	12.20	19.63	SR 612 (Old Yates Ford Road)	Henderson Road Old Ox Road Lee Chapel Road Burke Centre Parkway	SR 286 (Fairfax County Parkway)	An unsigned segment along SR 123 connects the southern segment of 643 (Henderson Road) with the northern segment (Lee Chapel Road and Burke Centre Parkway)
Fauquier	9.83	15.82	Dead End	Eustace Road Meetze Road	Warrenton town limits	Gap between segments ending at different points along SR 28
Floyd	0.60	0.97	US 221 (Floyd Highway)	Sweet Annie Drive	Dead End	
Fluvanna	1.90	3.06	SR 637 (Antioch Road)	Transco Road	SR 620 (Rolling Road)	
Franklin	15.96	25.69	SR 640 (Six Mile Post Road)	Hopkins Road Coles Creek Road Hickman Road Bethlehem Road Dillons Mill Road Adney Gap Road	SR 602 (Callaway Road)	Gap between segments ending at different points along SR 641 Gap between segments ending at different points along SR 739
Frederick	0.80	1.29	US 522 (Front Royal Pike)	Ritter Road	SR 642 (Armel Road)	
Giles	3.55	5.71	US 460	State Line Road Gray Sulpher Road	Dead End	
Gloucester	2.13	3.43	SR 216 (Guinea Road)	Mark Pine Road Cuba Road	Dead End	
Goochland	1.10	1.77	Dead End	West View Road	SR 600 (Rock Castle Road)	
Grayson	1.07	1.72	SR 619 (Petty Road)	Cardinal Road	Galax city limits	
Greene	1.10	1.77	SR 642 (Taylor Mountain Road)	Entry Run Road	Dead End	
Greensville	1.17	1.88	SR 635	Easter Street	SR 611 (Dry Bread Road)	
Halifax	1.00	1.61	Dead End	McKendree Church Road Cedar Fork Road	SR 610 (Crystal Hill Road)	Gap between segments ending at different points along US 501
Hanover	10.82	17.41	SR 156 (Cold Harbor Road)	Lee Davis Road Rural Point Road New Ashcake Road	SR 656 (Sliding Hill Road)	Gap between segments ending at different points along SR 627
Henry	0.09	0.14	US 220 Bus	Peanut Road	Dead End	
Highland	1.10	1.77	SR 642	Unnamed road	SR 644	
Isle of Wight	0.80	1.29	SR 648 (Duck Town Road)	Wood Duck Drive	SR 603 (Blackwater Road)	
James City	0.10	0.16	SR 644 (Monument Drive)	Magruder Lane	York County line	
King and Queen	0.83	1.34	Dead End	Airport Road	SR 33 (Lewis Puller Memorial Highway)	
King George	1.80	2.90	Dead End	Bald Eagle Drive	SR 625 (Salem Church Road)	
King William	0.03	0.05	SR 607 (Millwood Road)	Millwood Court	SR 600 (West River Road)	
Lancaster	2.80	4.51	SR 646 (Ocran Road)	Scott Road	Dead End	
Lee	5.03	8.10	US 58 (Daniel Boone Trail)	Ward Hill Road Unnamed road Kelly Road	US 58 Alt	Gap between segments ending at different points along SR 640
Loudoun	1.74	2.80	SR 1950 (Loudoun County Parkway)	Shellhorn Road	SR 2119 (Waxpool Road)	
Louisa	1.90	3.06	SR 605 (Shannon Hill Road)	Cuckoo Road	US 522 (Cross County Road)	
Lunenburg	11.10	17.86	SR 640 (Bagleys Mill Road)	New Grove Road	SR 635 (Oral Oaks Road)	Gap between segments ending at different points along SR 635
Madison	5.70	9.17	SR 670 (Old Blue Ridge Turnpike)	Weakley Hollow Road Etlan Road Church Hill Road	SR 603 (Whippoorwill Road)	Gap between segments ending at different points along SR 600
Mathews	3.00	4.83	SR 642 (Fitchetts Wharf Road)	Haven Beach Road Lillys Neck Road Haven Beach Road	Dead End	
Mecklenburg	2.27	3.65	SR 642 (Rocky Branch Road)	County Lane Thompson Street	Dead End	Gap between segments ending at different points along the town limits of South Hill
Middlesex	0.81	1.30	SR 33 (General Puller Highway)	Horseshoe Bend Road	Dead End	
Montgomery	4.39	7.07	Christiansburg town limits	Yellow Sulphur Road	Blacksburg town limits	
Nelson	0.60	0.97	SR 639 (Laurel Road)	Ball Mountain Lane	Dead End	
New Kent	0.50	0.80	SR 106 (Emmaus Church Road)	Mihalcoe Lane	Dead End	
Northampton	1.40	2.25	US 13 (Lankford Highway)	Plantation Drive	SR 600 (Seaside Road)	
Northumberland	0.70	1.13	SR 644 (Hacks Neck Road/Ferry Road)	Vir-Mar Beach Road	Dead End	
Nottoway	1.38	2.22	Blackstone town limits	West Entrance Road	Dead End	
Orange	7.29	11.73	SR 1014 (Mill Street)	East Street Cox Mill Road	SR 638 (Mountain Track Road)	
Page	0.05	0.08	Dead End	Luray Avenue	Luray town limits	
Patrick	1.35	2.17	SR 644 (Creasy Chapel Road)	Dobyns Church Road	SR 631 (Dobyns Road)	
Pittsylvania	3.89	6.26	Dead End	Derby Road	SR 653 (Izaak Walton Road)	
Powhatan	0.70	1.13	SR 614 (Mill Road)	Liberty Hill Road	Dead End	
Prince Edward	4.30	6.92	SR 658 (Five Forks Road)	Back Hampden Sydney Road High Street	Farmville town limits	
Prince George	0.09	0.14	Dead End	Bobs Way	SR 647 (Takgach Road)	
Prince William	8.16	13.13	SR 234 (Dumfries Road)	Purcell Road Spriggs Road	SR 234 (Dumfries Road)	Gap between segments ending at different points along SR 642
Pulaski	10.51	16.91	SR 611 (Newburn Road)	Cougar Trail Road Thorn Springs Road Alum Spring Road	SR 601 (Little Creek Road)	Gap between segments ending at different points along US 11 Gap between segments ending at different points along SR 636
Rappahannock	2.00	3.22	US 211 (Lee Highway)	Hinsons Ford Road	Dead End	
Richmond	1.16	1.87	SR 614 (Folly Neck Road)	The Hook Road	Dead End	
Roanoke	1.21	1.95	US 11 (West Main Street)	Daugherty Road	Dead End	
Rockbridge	0.25	0.40	SR 641	Saddle Ridge Road	Dead End	
Rockingham	1.30	2.09	SR 644 (Mount Olivet Church Road)	Waterloo Mill Lane	SR 641 (Waterloo Mill Lane/White Rose Road)	
Russell	0.70	1.13	SR 603 (Mountain Road)	Belfast School Road	US 19	
Scott	8.28	13.33	SR 665 (Manville Road)	Unnamed road	SR 870 (Daniel Boone Trail)	
Shenandoah	0.30	0.48	SR 601	Tumbling Run Lane	Dead End	
Smyth	1.90	3.06	SR 642	Unnamed road	SR 645 (Fox Valley Road)	
Southampton	6.60	10.62	SR 641 (Sedley Road)	Bethel Road Unnamed road	SR 645 (Vicksville Road)	Gap between segments ending at different points along SR 646
Spotsylvania	3.46	5.57	SR 655 (Ridge Road)	Haleys Mill Road Williams Lane	Dead End	
Stafford	2.30	3.70	SR 627 (Mountain View Road)	Joshua Road	SR 610 (Garrisonville Road)	
Surry	2.18	3.51	SR 31 (Rolfe Highway)	James Street	SR 614 (New Design Road)	
Sussex	5.60	9.01	SR 644 (Faison Road)	Loco School Road Unnamed road	SR 640 (Briggs Road)	
Tazewell	29.29	47.14	SR 624 (Amonate Road)	Fairday Road Unnamed road Johnson Branch Road Healing Spring Road Mud Fork Road Brush Fork Road	West Virginia state line	Gap between segments ending at different points along SR 16 Gap between segments ending at different points along SR 102
Warren	1.22	1.96	SR 624 (Morgan Ford Road)	Howellsville Road	SR 603 (Oregon Hollow Road)	
Washington	0.19	0.31	SR 91	Hardy Drive	SR 91	
Westmoreland	2.19	3.52	Dead End	Sanford Drive Chilton Road	SR 645 (Zacata Road)	
Wise	6.43	10.35	SR 644 (Pole Bridge Road)	Redwine Road Green Hollow Road	SR 636 (Dotson Creek Road)	Gap between segments ending at different points along SR 640
Wythe	6.50	10.46	Dead End	Cole Branch Drive Sillings Road Old School Road	SR 640 (Piney Mountain Road)	Gap between segments ending at different points along SR 642 Gap between segments ending at different points along SR 619
York	0.20	0.32	SR 713 (Waller Mill Road)	Caran Road	Dead End	
