= Plain View, Powhatan County, Virginia =

Unincorporated community in Virginia, US

Coordinates: 37°32′18″N 77°53′18″W

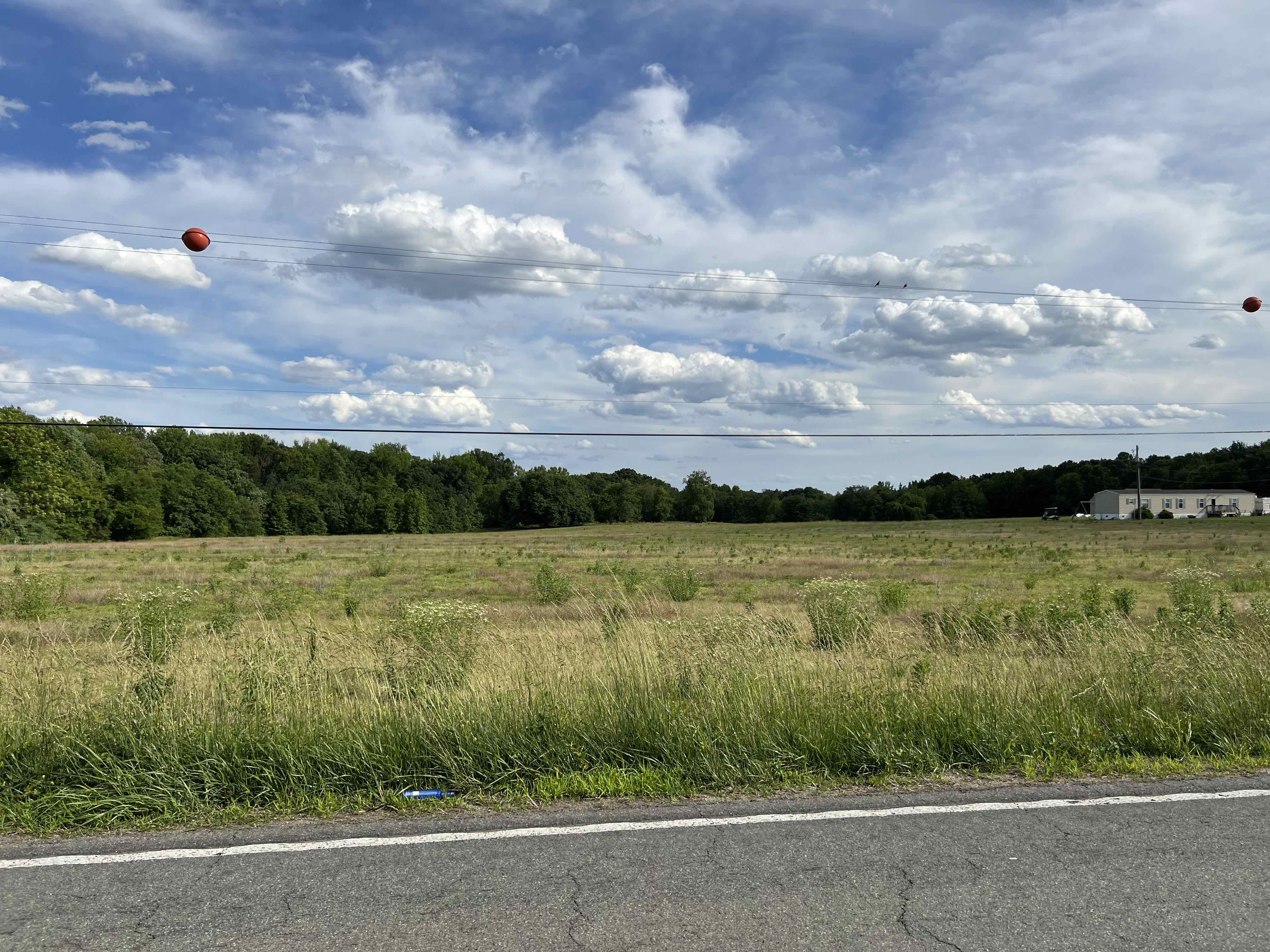
Plainview Airport in Plain View.

Plain View, Powhatan County is an unincorporated community in Powhatan County, in the U.S. state of Virginia.
