= Virginia State Route 619 =

State highway in Virginia, United States

State Route 619

Route information
- Maintained by VDOT

Location
- Country: United States
- State: Virginia

Highway system
- Virginia Routes; Interstate; US; Primary; Secondary; Byways; History; HOT lanes

State Route 619 (SR 619) in the U.S. state of Virginia is a secondary route designation applied to multiple discontinuous road segments among the many counties. The list below describes the sections in each county that are designated SR 619.

== List ==
County	Length (mi)	Length (km)	From	Via	To	Notes
Accomack	2.70	4.35	SR 614/SR 1204 (Cosby Street)	Hickman Street Boggs Road	SR 180 (Pungoteauge Road)	
Albemarle	0.20	0.32	SR 620 (Rolling Road)	Ruritan Lake Road	Fluvanna County Line	
Alleghany	4.23	6.81	Dead End	Unnamed road Hayes Gap Road	SR 657 (Pitzer Ridge Road)	Gap between segments ending at different points along SR 616
Amelia	7.35	11.83	Prince Edward County Line	Bunker Hill Road	SR 617 (Saylers Creek Road)	
Amherst	2.31	3.72	Dead End	Bearfield Road	SR 735 (Maple Run Road)	
Appomattox	1.20	1.93	SR 620 (Old Bethany Road)	Rocks Church Road	SR 633 (Hixburg Road)	
Augusta	5.99	9.64	SR 254 (Hermitage Road)	Hildebrand Church Road Purple Cow Road	SR 611 (Dooms Crossing Road)	Gap between segments ending at different points along SR 865 Gap between a dead end and US 340
Bath	0.55	0.89	SR 645 (Old Mill Road)	Court House Hill Road Unnamed road	Dead End	Gap between segments ending at different points along US 220
Bedford	13.47	21.68	SR 634 (Hardy Road)	Turner Branch Road Jordantown Road Pendleton Road Foster Road	SR 690 (Nester Road)	Gap between SR 757 and SR 24 Gap between segments ending at different points along SR 691
Bland	0.40	0.64	SR 617 (Waddletown Road)	Green Hill Road	Dead End	
Botetourt	0.30	0.48	Dead End	Noel Hollow Road	SR 618 (Chestnut Run Road)	
Brunswick	4.72	7.60	SR 620 (Old Poole Road)	Shining Creek Road	SR 644 (Little Dear Road)	
Buchanan	8.78	14.13	SR 605 (Russell Fork)	Lee Master Drive	SR 83	
Buckingham	1.30	2.09	Dead End	Apple Blossom Road	SR 636 (Francisco Road)	
Campbell	0.50	0.80	SR 600 (Dog Creek Road)	Patrick Henry Drive	Charlotte County Line	
Caroline	3.78	6.08	SR 207	Milford Street Chase Street	SR 640 (Smoots Road/Wrightsville Road)	
Carroll	1.70	2.74	Floyd County Line	Greasy Creek Road Phillips Road	Floyd County Line	Gap between segments ending at different points along SR 613
Charles City	3.47	5.58	Dead End	Weyanoke Road	SR 5 (John Tyler Memorial Highway)	
Charlotte	21.29	34.26	Campbell County Line	Staunton Hill Road Ridgeway Road Aspen Wall Road Cub Creek Church Road Harrisburg Road Chandler Fork Road Double Bridges Road	SR 47 (Drakes Main Street)	Gap between segments ending at different points along SR 678 Gap between segments ending at different points along SR 637
Chesterfield	5.03	8.10	US 1 (Jefferson Davis Highway)	Happy Hill Road Old Happy Hill Road	SR 625 (Branders Bridge Road)	
Clarke	0.95	1.53	SR 651 (Clay Hill Road)	Unnamed road	SR 617 (Briggs Road)	Gap between dead ends
Craig	0.23	0.37	Dead End	Coleys Cliff Road	SR 311	
Culpeper	6.80	10.94	SR 610 (Eleys Ford Road)	Richards Ferry Road	Stafford County Line	
Cumberland	0.36	0.58	US 60 (Anderson Highway)	Fleming Road	US 60 (Anderson Highway)	
Dickenson	4.55	7.32	SR 607/SR 700 (The Lake Road)	Skeetrock Road Unnamed road	SR 611 (Blowing Rock Road)	Gap between segments ending at different points along SR 695
Dinwiddie	13.40	21.57	Sussex County Line	Courthouse Road	US 1 (Boydton Plank Road)	
Essex	7.87	12.67	King and Queen County Line	Sunnyside Road Kino Road	US 360 (Richmond Highway)	
Fairfax	1.00	1.61	US 1 (Richmond Highway)	Old Mill Road	Dead End	
Fauquier	1.80	2.90	Dead End	Bollingbrook Road Patrick Street Trappe Road	Loudoun County Line	Gap between segments ending at different points along US 50
Floyd	11.27	18.14	SR 622 (Indian Valley Post Office Road)	Windy Ridge Road Phillips Road Horse Ridge Road Homestead Road	Dead End	Gap between segments ending at different points along SR 787
Fluvanna	5.40	8.69	Albemarle County Line	Ruritan Lake Road	SR 660 (Sclaters Ford Road)	
Franklin	19.87	31.98	SR 40/SR 756	Pleasant Hill Road Sontag Road Fanny Cook Road	Henry County Line	Gap between segments ending at different points along US 220 Gap between segments ending at different points along SR 890
Frederick	3.30	5.31	SR 622 (Cedar Creek Grade)	Perry Road	SR 608 (Wardensville Grade)	
Giles	0.61	0.98	US 460	Mays Hollow Road Unnamed road	Dead End	
Gloucester	1.20	1.93	Dead End	Fiddlers Green Road	US 17/US 17 Bus	
Goochland	0.95	1.53	SR 700 (Three Chopt Road)	Newline Road	Louisa County Line	
Grayson	2.29	3.69	SR 607 (Meadow Creek Road)	Cardinal Road Petty Road	Galax City Limits	
Greene	4.30	6.92	SR 609 (Fredericksburg Road)	Dundee Road	SR 230 (Madison Road)	
Greensville	11.23	18.07	Emporia City Limits	Purdy Road	Sussex County Line	
Halifax	2.90	4.67	SR 603 (Hunting Creek Road)	Hardings Mill Road	SR 623 (Mortons Ferry Road)	
Hanover	7.83	12.60	SR 156 (Cold Harbor Road)	Rockhill Road Westwood Road Hopewell Road	New Kent County Line	Gap between segments ending at different points along SR 628
Henry	8.70	14.00	Pittsylvania County Line	Mount Vernon Road Lawrence Drive North Fork Road Max Kendal Road	Franklin County Line	Gap between segments ending at different points along SR 647 Gap between segments ending at different points along SR 57
Highland	3.91	6.29	SR 654 (Johnston Road)	Unnamed road	SR 614	
Isle of Wight	4.00	6.44	Southampton County Line	Burdette Road Stevens Drive	SR 641 (Colosse Road)	Gap between segments ending at different points along US 258
King and Queen	7.60	12.23	SR 721 (Newtown Road)	Owens Mill Road	Essex County Line	
King George	2.60	4.18	SR 205 (Ridge Road)	Good Hope Road Stoney Point Road	Dead End	Gap between segments ending at different points along SR 218
King William	2.16	3.48	SR 30 (King William Road)	Horse Landing Road	SR 670 (Horse Landing Road)	
Lancaster	0.10	0.16	Dead End	Whites Lane	SR 3 (Mary Ball Road)	
Lee	5.47	8.80	US 58 Bus	Bill Jessee Road Love Lady Gap Road	SR 611 (Jasper Road)	Gap between segments ending at different points along SR 642
Loudoun	6.40	10.30	Fauquier County Line	Trappe Road	SR 719 (Airmont Road)	
Louisa	2.00	3.22	Goochland County Line	New Line Road	US 522 (Cross County Road)	
Lunenburg	4.50	7.24	SR 138 (Hill Road)	Oak Hill Road Reedy Branch Road	Brunswick County Line	Gap between segments ending at different points along SR 610
Madison	0.15	0.24	Dead End	Ruckers Ford Lane	SR 621 (Jacks Shop Road)	
Mathews	1.96	3.15	Dead End	Cakes Creek Lane Turnpike Road Mill Lane Road	Dead End	Gap between segments ending at different points along SR 617 Gap between segments ending at different points along SR 660
Mecklenburg	4.30	6.92	SR 751 (Golf Drive)/SR 903	Nellie Jones Road	SR 620 (Hall Road)	
Middlesex	2.70	4.35	SR 629 (Stormont Road)	Healys Road Burhans Wharf Road	Dead End	Gap between segments ending at different points along SR 33
Montgomery	1.80	2.90	SR 705 (Coal Hollow Road)	Stroubles Creek	Dead End	
Nelson	2.90	4.67	US 29/SR 6	Twin Poplar Loop Hill Hollow Road	SR 810 (Duncan Hollow Loop)	Gap between segments ending at different points along SR 634
New Kent	3.11	5.01	Hanover County Line	Hopewell Road	SR 606 (Old Church Road)	
Northampton	7.90	12.71	SR 1515 (Peacock Lane)	Church Neck Road Bayside Road Cabarrus Drive Giddens Road	SR 609 (Franktown Road)	Gap between segments ending at different points along SR 618 Gap between segments ending at different points along SR 617
Northumberland	2.10	3.38	SR 618 (Fruit Plain Road)	Valley Drive Deer Run Road	SR 202 (Hampton Hall Road)	Gap between segments ending at different points along SR 617
Nottoway	8.08	13.00	SR 618 (Indian Oak Road)	Tyler Street Tyler Road Creek Road	SR 615 (Namozine Road)	Gap between segments ending at different points along SR 615
Orange	2.80	4.51	SR 624 (Tower Road)	Sunnyside Road	SR 692 (Saint Just Road)	
Page	3.49	5.62	Dead End	Lucas Hollow Road	SR 621 (Keystone Road)	
Patrick	2.04	3.28	Dead End	Brammer Spur Road	SR 616 (Mill Houses Road)	
Pittsylvania	0.90	1.45	Henry County Line	Belmont Drive	SR 841 (Stillmeadow Road)	
Powhatan	3.10	4.99	Dead End	Pineview Drive Unnamed road	Cul-de-Sac	
Prince Edward	7.00	11.27	SR 600 (Gully Tavern Road)	Lockett Road	Amelia County Line	
Prince George	2.10	3.38	SR 625 (Arwood Road/County Line Road)	Holdsworths Road	SR 627 (Pumphouse Road/Loving Union Road)	
Prince William	27.21	43.79	US 29 (Lee Highway)	Linton Hall Road Bristow Road Joplin Road Fuller Heights Road	SR 761 (Windsor Road)	Gap between segments ending at different points along Old SR 234 Gap between US 1 and Fuller Military Road
Pulaski	4.33	6.97	SR 693 (Lead Mine Road)	Izaak Walton League Road Bleak Ridge Road	SR 613 (Cherry Branch Road)	Gap between segments ending at different points along SR 605
Rappahannock	1.82	2.93	SR 626 (Whorton Hollow Road)	Lizzie Mills Road	SR 618 (Laurel Mills Road)	
Richmond	7.32	11.78	SR 3 (Historyland Highway)	Mulberry Road Rich Neck Road	Westmoreland County Line	
Roanoke	3.33	5.36	SR 112 (Wildwood Road)	Wildwood Road	Salem City Limits	
Rockbridge	0.12	0.19	SR 712/SR 729	Twin Oaks Lane	Dead End	
Rockingham	12.19	19.62	SR 721 (Longs Pump Road)	Simmers Valley Road Phillips Store Road Wampler Road Piney Woods Road	Shenandoah County Line	
Russell	3.90	6.28	SR 80 (Hayters Gap Road)	Corn Valley Road	Dead End	
Scott	21.31	34.30	US 23	Filter Plant Ford Unnamed road Old Nickelsville Road Reed Hollow Road Unnamed road	Wise County Line	Gap between segments ending at different points along SR 72
Shenandoah	0.99	1.59	Rockingham County Line	Miller Lane	SR 211/SR 305 (George Collins Parkway)	
Smyth	2.50	4.02	SR 610 (Old Rich Valley Road)	Dotson Ridge Road	SR 42 (Old Wilderness Road)	
Southampton	2.31	3.72	SR 635 (Black Creek Road)	Burdette Road	Isle of Wight County Line	
Spotsylvania	1.55	2.49	SR 620 (Spottswood Furnace Road)	Mill Road	Cul-de-Sac	
Stafford	0.41	0.66	SR 628 (Eskimo Hill Road)	Montague Lane	SR 628 (Eskimo Hill Road)	
Surry	0.34	0.55	Dead End	Grayland Drive	SR 618 (Southwick Road)	
Sussex	3.80	6.12	Greensville County Line	Walkers Mill Road	Dinwiddie County Line	
Tazewell	0.11	0.18	Dead End	Flood Lane	SR 637 (Dry Fork Road)	
Warren	8.75	14.08	US 340 (Stonewall Jackson Highway)	Rivermont Drive Mountain Road	SR 678 (Fort Valley Road)	
Washington	0.80	1.29	SR 613 (Poor Valley Road)	Roan Lane	Dead End	
Westmoreland	0.75	1.21	Richmond County Line	Chestnut Level Lane	SR 600 (Ebenezer Church Road)	
Wise	2.45	3.94	Scott County Line	Unnamed road	Norton City Limits	Formerly SR 73
Wythe	26.35	42.41	US 21 (Grayson Turnpike)	Saint Peters Road Cripple Creek Road Gleaves Road Huddle Road Austinville Road Major Grahams Road	FR-44 (Lee Highway)	Gap between segments ending at different points along US 52
York	0.79	1.27	SR 620 (Link Road)	Ship Point Road Anchor Drive	Dead End	
