= Belona, Virginia =

Belona
- unincorporated community
- Location within the state of Virginia Belona (the United States)
- Coordinates: 37°31′17″N 78°00′31″W
- Country: United States
- State: Virginia
- County: Powhatan
- Time zone: UTC−5 (Eastern (EST))
  - Summer (DST): UTC−4 (EDT)
- GNIS feature ID: 1463064

Belona is an unincorporated community in Powhatan County, in the U.S. state of Virginia.
