= Miskimon, Virginia =

Unincorporated community in Virginia, US

Coordinates: 37°50′16″N 76°28′34″W

Miskimon is an unincorporated community in Northumberland County, in the U.S. state of Virginia. Miskimon is on the county line with half of Miskimon in Northumberland, and the other half in Lancaster County.

Miskimon was known as Forrester's Shop in the 1800s due to the Forrester family having a large woodworking shop there. In the early 1900s, small post offices were being established at country stores. The Reverend Robert Miskimon, the pastor of Smyrna Methodist Church was influential in obtaining the rights for a post office in the village. The name of the village was changed to Miskimon. The 1st major business there was Beane's Mill, it may date to the 1600s, but it now lays in ruins. Beane's store was the only business in operation for many years and closed down in the 1970s. Miskimon had two churches: Smyrna Methodist and Providence Baptist. Providence Baptist is still in operation. The old family names in Miskimon are Dawson, Beane, Sampson, Marsh, Forrester and Cockrell.

Miskimon is the site of a historic fire lookout tower, which was the subject of a novel by local author Susan Anthony-Tolbert.
