= Worshams, Virginia =

Unincorporated community in Virginia, US

Coordinates: 37°32′08″N 77°53′38″W

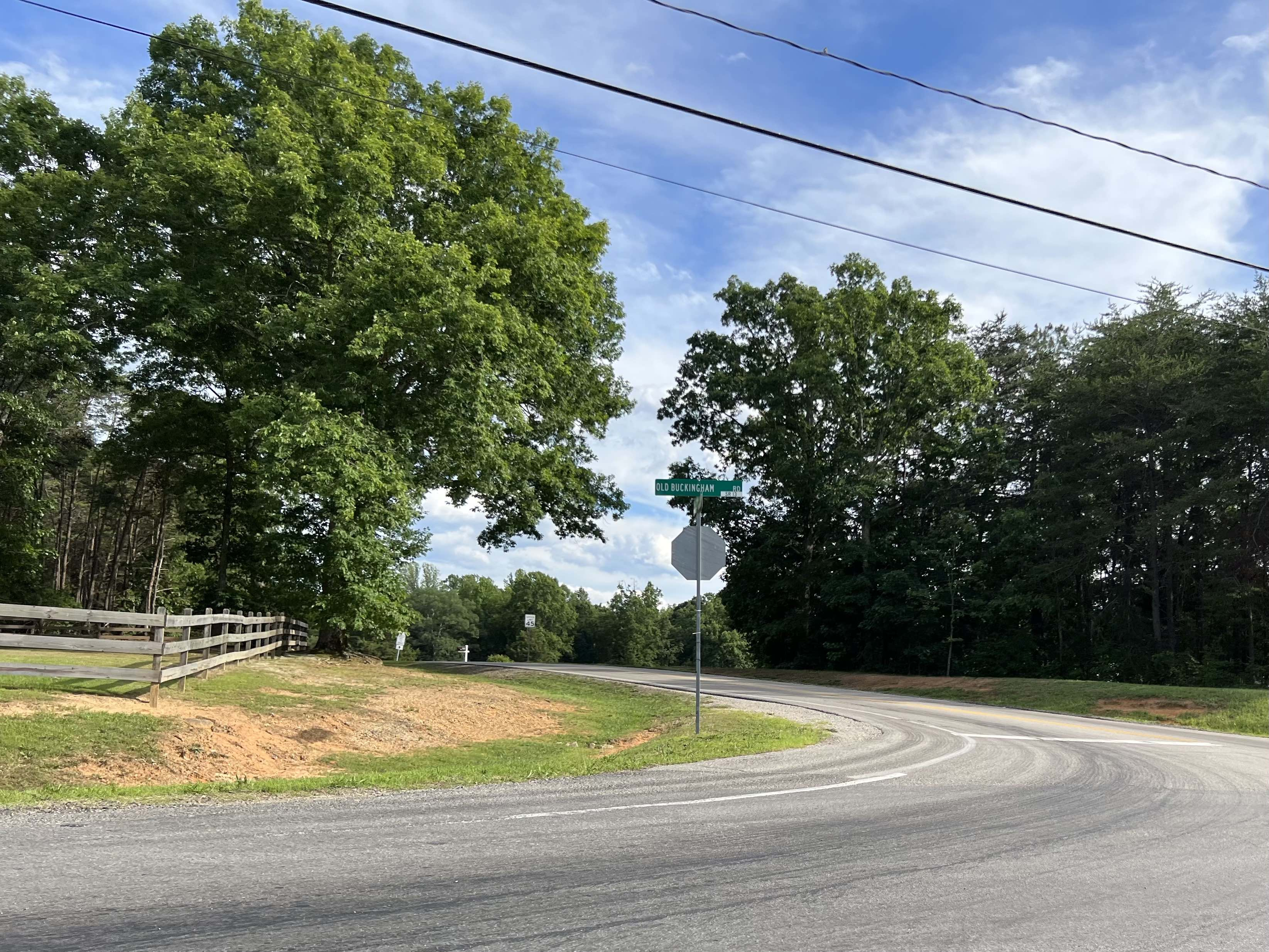
Worshams, Virginia intersection.

Worshams is an unincorporated community in Powhatan County, in the U.S. state of Virginia.
