= Howland, Virginia =

Unincorporated community in Virginia, US

Coordinates: 37°52′15″N 76°27′19″W

Howland is an unincorporated community in Northumberland County, in the U.S. state of Virginia.
