= Virginia State Route 635 =

State highway in Virginia, United States

State Route 635

Route information
- Maintained by VDOT

Location
- Country: United States
- State: Virginia

Highway system
- Virginia Routes; Interstate; US; Primary; Secondary; Byways; History; HOT lanes

State Route 635 (SR 635) in the U.S. state of Virginia is a secondary route designation applied to multiple discontinuous road segments among the many counties. The list below describes the sections in each county that are designated SR 635.

== List ==
County	Length (mi)	Length (km)	From	Via	To	Notes
Accomack	0.88	1.42	Dead End	Matchotank Road	SR 638 (Cashville Road)	
Albemarle	9.65	15.53	Nelson County Line	Craig Store Road Miller School Road	US 250 (Rockfish Gap Turnpike)	Gap between segments ending at different points along SR 692 (Plank Road)
Alleghany	2.08	3.35	SR 269 (Longdale Furnace Road)	Nicelytown Road	SR 42 (Forty Two Road)	
Amelia	2.40	3.86	SR 604 (Chula Road)	Mattoax Lane	Dead End	
Amherst	14.81	23.83	SR 130 (Elon Road)	Buffalo Springs Turnpike North Fork Road	Dead End	Gap between segments ending at different points along US 60
Appomattox	4.58	7.37	SR 700 (Cardinal Lane/Trent Hatchery Road)	Redfields Road Trent Hatchery Road Redfields Road	US 460 Bus	
Augusta	9.44	15.19	SR 639 (Wayne Avenue)	Mount Vernon Road Kindig Road Augusta Farms Road Ramsey Road Barterbrook Road	Staunton City Limits	Gap between segments ending at different points along US 340
Bath	6.78	10.91	SR 633 (Crooked Spur Road)	TC Walker Road Ridge Road Unnamed road	SR 640 (Mill Creek Road)	
Bedford	17.79	28.63	SR 633 (Gravel Hill Road)	Shady Run Road Beagle Club Road Jeters Chapel Road Lovers Lane Spradlin Road Moorman Road	Dead End	Gap between segments ending at different points along SR 634 Two gaps between segments ending at different points along SR 24 Gap between segments ending at different points along SR 619 Gap between segments ending at different points along SR 757
Bland	0.07	0.11	SR 637 (Starks Street)	Pearl Street	Cul-de-Sac	
Botetourt	11.01	17.72	SR 668 (Mount Pleasant Church Road)	Wind Road Timber Ridge Beaver Dam Road	SR 636 (Black Magic Farm Road)	
Brunswick	3.60	5.79	SR 630 (Sturgeon Road)	Black Bottom Road	SR 609 (Cutbank Road)	Gap between segments ending at different points along SR 712
Buchanan	10.74	17.28	SR 621 (Brown Mountain)	Unnamed road Wimmer Gap Road	SR 616	Gap between segments ending at different points along SR 638
Buckingham	4.30	6.92	SR 609 (New Stone Road)	Buckingham Springs Road	SR 633 (Bishop Creek Road/School Road)	
Campbell	9.12	14.68	Dead End	Melrose Road McIver Ferry Road Collins Ferry Road Flynn Street	US 501 (Brookneal Highway)	Gap between segments ending at different points along SR 633 Gap between segments ending at different points along SR 761
Caroline	0.70	1.13	SR 627 (Mount Landing Road)/King and Queen County Line	Elevon Road	SR 630 (Sparta Road)	
Carroll	14.99	24.12	SR 887 (Glendale Road)	Hebron Road Pot Rock Road Fowlers Ferry Road Stoots Mountain Road Van Lue Road	Wythe County Line	
Charles City	0.50	0.80	SR 620 (Lewis Tyler Lane)	Holy Tree Lane	Dead End	
Charlotte	0.60	0.97	SR 609 (Robertson Road)	Williams Road	SR 607 (West Spring Hill Road/Moody Creek Road)	
Chesterfield	2.30	3.70	SR 602 (River Road)	Reedy Branch Road	SR 636 (Nash Road)	
Clarke	2.65	4.26	Dead End	Moose Road Pierce Road	SR 660 (Russell Road)	
Craig	0.80	1.29	SR 632	Unnamed road	SR 658	
Culpeper	0.76	1.22	SR 646 (Old Stillhouse Road)	Hazeland Lane	Dead End	
Cumberland	4.20	6.76	SR 637 (Airport Road)	Pleasant Valley Road	Dead End	
Dickenson	0.95	1.53	Dead End	Unnamed road	SR 72 (Cranes Nest Road)	
Dinwiddie	0.40	0.64	Dead End	Hilltop Drive	SR 40 (McKenney Highway)	
Essex	8.65	13.92	SR 630 (Sparta Road)	Elevon Road Rose Mount Road Loretto Road	Dead End	Gap between segments ending at different points along SR 637
Fairfax	1.89	3.04	SR 611 (Telegraph Road)	Hayfield Road Fleet Drive	SR 7090 (Franconia Station Court)	Gap between SR 8113 and SR 613
Fauquier	11.60	18.67	Rappahannock County Line	Hume Road	SR 724 (Ada Road)	
Floyd	4.91	7.90	SR 615 (Griffith Lane)	Haycock Road County Line Church Road Thomas Farm Road	SR 680 (Starbuck Road)	Gap between segments ending at different points along SR 860
Fluvanna	0.52	0.84	Dead End	Cannery Lane	US 15 (James Madison Highway)	
Franklin	14.26	22.95	US 220 (Virgil H Goode Highway)	Bonbrook Mill Road Donbrook Mill Road Novella Road Mount Airy Road Pheasant Run Road Edwardsville Road Moorman Road Booth Road	Dead End	Gap between SR 116 and a dead end Gap between segments ending at different points along SR 678
Frederick	1.20	1.93	SR 625 (Veterans Road)	Mineral Street	SR 634 (Cougill Road)	Gap between segments ending at different points along SR 627
Giles	17.39	27.99	SR 808 (Camper Road)	Big Stoney Creek Road	West Virginia State Line	
Gloucester	2.32	3.73	Dead End	Borden Road Piney Swamp Road	US 17 (George Washington Memorial Highway)	Gap between segments ending at different points along SR 636
Goochland	3.05	4.91	SR 637 (Hawk Town Road)	Camelback Road Perkinsville Road	Louisa County Line	Gap between segments ending at different points along US 250
Grayson	2.20	3.54	Dead End	Scale House Lane	SR 634 (Longview Lane)	
Greene	1.20	1.93	Dead End	Matties Run Road	SR 634 (Mutton Hollow Road)	
Greensville	1.00	1.61	Dead End	Unnamed road	SR 611 (Dry Bread Road)	
Halifax	2.50	4.02	SR 360 (Mountain Road)	Loop Road	SR 665 (Nunnleys Bridge Road)	
Hanover	3.90	6.28	SR 615 (Creighton Road)	Sandy Valley Road	SR 634 (Beatties Mill Road)	
Henry	1.70	2.74	SR 622 (Morgan Ford Road)	Odell Road	SR 634 (Joppa Road)	
Highland	1.00	1.61	US 220	Unnamed road	Dead End	
Isle of Wight	1.00	1.61	SR 610 (Buckhorn Drive)	Dunston Drive	SR 608 (Tyler Drive)	
James City	0.23	0.37	SR 631 (Chickahominy Road)	Browns Drive	Cul-de-Sac	
King and Queen	5.62	9.04	SR 721 (Newtown Road)	Bradley Farm Road	Essex County Line	
King George	0.45	0.72	SR 614 (Owens Drive)	Gambo Creek Road	Dead End	
King William	1.80	2.90	Dead End	Romancoke Road Chelsea Road	SR 645 (Moorefield Road)	
Lancaster	0.42	0.68	Dead End	Steamboat Road	SR 200 (Irvington Road)	
Lee	1.26	2.03	SR 636 (Monarch Road)	Kemmer Gem Road Unnamed road	Dead End	
Loudoun	0.19	0.31	SR 606 (Old Ox Road)	Douglas Court	Cul-de-Sac	
Louisa	12.20	19.63	Goochland County Line	Factory Mill Drive West Chapel Drive Willow Brook Road	US 33 (Jefferson Highway)	Gap between segments ending at different points along SR 610
Lunenburg	13.60	21.89	Mecklenburg County Line	Oral Oaks Road	SR 40	
Madison	2.80	4.51	SR 614 (John Tucker Road)	Mount Zion Church Road	SR 634 (Oak Park Road)	
Mathews	0.60	0.97	SR 609 (Bethel Beach Road)	Ivison Lane	Dead End	
Mecklenburg	2.72	4.38	SR 47	Saffold Road	Lunenburg County Line	
Middlesex	0.80	1.29	Dead End	Mink Field Road	SR 602 (Wares Bridge Road)	
Montgomery	0.85	1.37	Dead End	Pedler	SR 603 (North Fork Road)	
Nelson	4.64	7.47	Dead End	Rockfish School Lane Craigs Store Road Cold Creek Road Greenfield Road Craigs Store Road	Albemarle County Line	Gap between segments ending at different points along SR 6/SR 151
New Kent	0.60	0.97	SR 601 (Tabernacle Road)	Triangle Road	SR 600 (Holly Fork Road)	
Northampton	0.35	0.56	SR 611 (Concord Wharf Road)	Batchelers Branch Road	Dead End	
Northumberland	1.45	2.33	SR 636 (Newmans Neck Road)	Sandy Beach Road	Dead End	
Nottoway	0.39	0.63	SR 724 (Old Plank Road)	Third Street	SR 712 (Millers Street)	
Orange	1.99	3.20	Dead End	Greenwood Road Jones Mill Road	SR 633 (Spicers Mill Road)	
Page	2.70	4.35	SR 636	Unnamed road Forest Drive	SR 638 (Aylor Grubbs Avenue)	
Patrick	2.54	4.09	Dead End	Gobblintown Creek Road Gobblintown Road	SR 704 (Iron Bridge Road)	
Pittsylvania	2.20	3.54	SR 782 (Fruitridge Drive)	Armstrong Road	SR 40/SR 626	
Powhatan	4.85	7.81	SR 675 (Page Road)	Manakin Town Ferry Road Unnamed road Manakin Town Ferry Road Unnamed road	SR 711 (Huguenot Trail Road)	
Prince Edward	0.80	1.29	SR 654 (Cabbage Patch Road)	Ole Briery Station Road	Dead End	
Prince George	9.40	15.13	SR 629 (East Quaker Road)	Centennial Road Heritage Road	SR 10 (James River Drive)	
Prince William	3.16	5.09	John Pary Way	Allen Dent Road Barley Drive Cherry Hill Road	Dead End	Gap between US 1 and River Ridge Boulevard Gap between a cul-de-sac and SR 1194
Pulaski	0.53	0.85	Dead End	Baskerville Street	SR 747 (Old Route 11)	
Rappahannock	0.70	1.13	US 522 (Zachary Taylor Avenue)	Fiery Run Road	Fauquier County Line	
Richmond	1.41	2.27	SR 624 (Newland Road)	Grove Mount Road	SR 636 (Havelock Road)	
Roanoke	0.60	0.97	Salem City Limits	Goodwin Avenue	SR 619 (Wildwood Road)	
Rockbridge	1.02	1.64	Dead End	Unnamed road	Dead End	
Rockingham	3.60	5.79	US 33 Bus	River Road Humes Run Road	SR 665 (Dovel Road)	
Russell	6.40	10.30	SR 633 (Clarks Valley Road)	Maple Gap Road Horton Ridge Road	SR 634 (Pine Creek Road)	Gap between segments ending at different points along SR 67
Scott	5.73	9.22	SR 634	Unnamed road	SR 713 (Frisco Yard Road)	
Shenandoah	1.15	1.85	Strasburg Town Limits	Bowman Hill Road	Warren County Line	Gap between segments ending at different points along SR 634
Smyth	2.90	4.67	Saltville Town Limits	Valley Road	SR 610 (Valley Drive)	
Southampton	16.60	26.72	SR 641 (Sedley Road)	Oberry Church Road Black Creek Road Unnamed road Unity Road Oberry Church Road Tucker Swamp Road	SR 620 (Broadwater Road)	
Spotsylvania	2.53	4.07	US 17 (Mills Drive)	Lee Hill School Drive	SR 736 (Eagle Drive)	
Stafford	2.95	4.75	SR 611 (Widewater Road)	Decatur Road	SR 2120 (Indian View Court)	
Surry	1.20	1.93	SR 10 (Colonial Trail)	College Run Drive	Dead End	
Sussex	10.42	16.77	SR 610 (Harrell Road)	Unnamed road	SR 735 (Courthouse Road)	Gap between segments ending at different points along SR 631
Tazewell	3.27	5.26	Tazewell Town Limits	Hubble Hill Road Mundytown Road	SR 16 (Stoney Ridge Road)	Gap between segments ending at different points along SR 631
Warren	2.10	3.38	Shenandoah County Line	Bowmans Mill Road	SR 611	
Washington	0.60	0.97	SR 636 (Dishner Valley Road)	Young Drive	SR 633 (Reedy Creek Road)	
Westmoreland	1.00	1.61	Dead End	Parrish Lane	SR 638 (Leedstown Road)	
Wise	2.90	4.67	SR 636 (Dotson Creek Road)	Unnamed road	SR 634 (Bean Gap Road)	
Wythe	0.65	1.05	Carroll County Line	Van Lue Road	Dead End	
York	0.30	0.48	Dead End	Marl Pit Road	SR 637 (Union Road)	
