= Virginia State Route 640 =

State highway in Virginia, United States

State Route 640

Route information
- Maintained by VDOT

Location
- Country: United States
- State: Virginia

Highway system
- Virginia Routes; Interstate; US; Primary; Secondary; Byways; History; HOT lanes

State Route 640 (SR 640) in the U.S. state of Virginia is a secondary route designation applied to multiple discontinuous road segments among the many counties. The list below describes the sections in each county that are designated SR 640.

== List ==
County	Length (mi)	Length (km)	From	Via	To	Notes
Accomack	2.50	4.02	SR 638 (Cashville Road)	Kittens Branch Road Gaskins Road	SR 609 (Brickhouse Drive)	Gap between segments ending at different points along SR 718
Albemarle	12.69	20.42	SR 641 (Burnley Station Road)	Gilbert Station Road Turkey Sag Road Saint Johns Road Cobham Station Lane	Dead End	Gap between segments ending at different points along SR 20
Alleghany	2.80	4.51	SR 687 (Jackson River Road)	Falls Road	US 220 (Hot Springs Road)	
Amelia	11.08	17.83	SR 671 (Jetersville Road)	Perkinson Road Buckskin Creek Road Mapelwood Road Richardson Road	SR 639 (Mount Zion Road)	
Amherst	2.72	4.38	SR 607 (Beverly Town Road)	Lovely Lady Creek Road	SR 635 (Buffalo Springs Turnpike)	
Appomattox	1.35	2.17	SR 626 (Holiday Lake Road)	Woolridge Road	Buckingham County Line	
Augusta	5.84	9.40	SR 285 (Tinkling Spring Road)	Goose Creek Road White Bridge Road Old White Bridge Road	SR 828 (Cattle Scales Road)	
Bath	9.41	15.14	SR 39/SR 42	Mill Creek Road	SR 629 (Deerfield Road)	
Bedford	14.39	23.16	SR 122 (Big Island Highway)	Forbes Mill Road Wheats Valley Road Gunstock Creek Road Cornelius Road	SR 122 (Big Island Highway)	Gap between segments ending at different points along SR 643
Bland	4.70	7.56	Dead End	Crystal Springs Drive Trails End Drive	Dead End	
Botetourt	14.14	22.76	US 220 (Roanoke Road)	Brughs Mill Road Nace Road Lithia Road	US 11 (Lee Highway)	Gap between segments ending at different points along US 11
Brunswick	5.30	8.53	SR 642 (Poor House Road)	Piney Woods Road Farmers Field Road	SR 630 (Sturgeon Road)	
Buchanan	4.20	6.76	SR 638 (Dismal River Road)	Hale Creek	SR 83	
Buckingham	11.93	19.20	Appomattox County Line	Wool Ridge Road Andersonville Road	US 15 (James Madison Highway)	Gap between segments ending at different points along SR 636
Campbell	1.81	2.91	Pittsylvania County Line	Mansion Bridge Road	SR 712 (Riverbend Road)	
Caroline	10.57	17.01	Dead End	Industrial Drive New Baltimore Road Wrightsville Road Smoots Road Maragossic Drive	SR 721 (Sparta Road)	Gap between segments ending at different points along SR 722 Gap between segments ending at different points along US 301/SR 2 Gap between segments ending at different points along SR 641
Carroll	7.80	12.55	SR 608/SR 677	Parkside Drive Keno Road	SR 631 (Old Mill Road)	
Charles City	0.16	0.26	SR 5 (John Tyler Memorial Highway)	Herring Creek Road	SR 5 (John Tyler Memorial Highway)	
Charlotte	2.21	3.56	Dead End	Laconia Road Wheatland Road	Mecklenburg County Line	Gap between segments ending at different points along US 15
Chesterfield	1.21	1.95	SR 637 (Hopkins Road)	Old Hopkins Road Conifer Road	SR 641 (Beulah Road)	
Clarke	2.20	3.54	SR 632 (Crums Church Road)	Withers Larue Lane	West Virginia State Line	
Craig	0.46	0.74	SR 42	Conrad Street	SR 650 (Marshall Avenue)	
Culpeper	8.95	14.40	Rappahannock County Line	Docs Road Monumental Mills Road Ryland Chapel Road	SR 625 (Mount Zion Church Road)	Gap between segments ending at different points along SR 229
Cumberland	4.20	6.76	SR 638 (Guinea Road/John Randolph Road)	Holman Mill Road	SR 45 (Cumberland Road)	
Dickenson	1.60	2.57	SR 72 (Cranes Nest Road)	Unnamed road	Dead End	
Dinwiddie	1.40	2.25	US 460	Hobbs Mill Road	Nottoway County Line	
Essex	4.31	6.94	SR 637 (Hustle Road)	Ullainee Road Clarkes Store Road	US 17 (Tidewater Trail)	
Fairfax	3.52	5.66	SR 644 (Old Keene Mill Road)	Sydenstricker Road Gambrill Road Gambrill Court	Dead End	
Fauquier	1.30	2.09	SR 806 (Elk Run Road)	Laws Ford Road	Dead End	
Floyd	1.54	2.48	Blue Ridge Parkway/SR 681	Franklin Pike	Franklin County Line	
Fluvanna	11.38	18.31	Dead End	Shores Road Cunningham Road Haden Martin Road	US 15 (James Madison Highway)	Gap between segments ending at different points along SR 6
Franklin	15.75	25.35	Floyd County Line	Five Mile Mountain Road Turners Creek Road Rock Ridge Road Six Mile Post Road Scuffling Hill Road	Rocky Mount Town Limits	Gap between segments ending at different points along SR 602 Gap between segments ending at different points along SR 40
Frederick	3.90	6.28	Warren County Line	Refuge Church Road	SR 641 (Double Church Road)	Gap between segments ending at different points along SR 636
Giles	0.67	1.08	SR 100 (Narrows Road)	Thomas Drive	SR 100 (Narrows Road)	
Gloucester	0.35	0.56	SR 652 (Guinea Circle)	Smiley Road	Dead End	
Goochland	0.24	0.39	SR 6 (Patteson Avenue)	Rochelle Road	Dead End	
Grayson	4.89	7.87	SR 94 (Riverside Drive)	Unnamed road Camp Dickenson Lane Greenville Road	Galax City Limits	Gap between segments ending at different points along SR 638 Gap between dead ends
Greene	1.20	1.93	SR 633 (Dairy Road)	Watson Road	Dead End	
Greensville	0.75	1.21	US 58/SR 607	Ruritan Drive	SR 681/SR 1020	
Halifax	6.30	10.14	SR 650 (Mulberry Road)	Buffalo Road	SR 639 (Rock Barn Road)	
Hanover	4.01	6.45	US 360 Bus (Mechanicsville Turnpike)	Shady Grove Road	SR 1202 (Laurel Grove Road)/SR 1231 (Jupiter Drive)	
Henry	2.90	4.67	SR 750 (Old Leaksville Road)	Old Mill Road	SR 642 (Eggleston Falls Road)	
Highland	15.12	24.33	SR 84 (Mill Gap Road)	Meadowdale Road Blue Grass Valley Road Unnamed road	West Virginia State Line	
Isle of Wight	1.40	2.25	SR 609 (Knoxville Road)	Willie Roberts Road	SR 689 (Willie Roberts Road)	
James City	0.31	0.50	Cul-de-Sac	Powhatan Springs Road	SR 615 (Ironbound Road)	
King and Queen	2.30	3.70	SR 721 (Newtown Road)	Lyneville Road	SR 623 (Indians Neck Road)	
King George	0.10	0.16	SR 614 (Potomac Drive)	Eleventh Street	SR 636 (Rosedale Drive)	
King William	6.02	9.69	SR 625 (Custis Millpond Road)	Wakema Road	SR 30 (King William Road)	
Lancaster	0.40	0.64	SR 639 (Beach Road)	River Bluff Road	Dead End	
Lee	6.79	10.93	US 58 (Daniel Boone Heritage Highway)	Shavers Ford Road Harrell Street	US 58 Alt	
Loudoun	3.13	5.04	SR 2348 (Glebe View Drive)	Broadlands Boulevard Shellhorn Road Waxpool Road	SR 1950 (Smith Switch Road)/SR 625 (Farmwell Road)	Gap between SR 641 and SR 2119
Louisa	26.30	42.33	SR 615 (Columbia Road)	Jack Jouett Road Old Mountain Road	SR 629 (Cartersville Road)	Gap between segments ending at different points along SR 208 Gap between segments ending at different points along SR 604 Gap between segments ending at different points along SR 605
Lunenburg	3.10	4.99	SR 636 (Whittles Mill Road)	Bagleys Mill Road	SR 635 (Oral Oaks Road)	
Madison	4.30	6.92	SR 604 (Towles Road)	Mill Hill Road Wilderness Road Tryme Road	SR 609 (Hoover Road)	Gap between segments ending at different points along SR 607
Mathews	1.55	2.49	SR 223 (Cricket Hill Road)	Point Breeze Road	Dead End	
Mecklenburg	6.50	10.46	Charlotte County Line	Organville Road	SR 49	Gap between segments ending at different points along SR 609
Middlesex	5.30	8.53	US 17 (Tidewater Trail)	Waterview Road	Dead End	Formerly SR 226
Montgomery	3.11	5.01	Christiansburg Town Limits	Falling Branch Road	Dead End	
Nelson	8.00	12.87	SR 641 (Eades Lane)	Wheelers Cove Road	SR 623 (Stage Bridge Road)	
New Kent	5.23	8.42	US 60 (Pocohontas Trail)	Old Roxbury Road	SR 611 (South Quaker Road)	Gap between segments ending at different points along SR 249
Northampton	1.32	2.12	Dead End	Bellevue Lane Wilkins Drive	SR 663 (Cherrystone Road)	Gap between segments ending at different points along SR 680
Northumberland	7.53	12.12	Dead End	Pumpkin Hill Road Hull Neck Road Marshalls Beach Road	Dead End	Gap between segments ending at different points along US 360
Nottoway	2.30	3.70	SR 612 (Old Richmond Road)	Wilson Road	Dinwiddie County Line	
Orange	0.20	0.32	SR 692 (Burr Hill Road)	West Virginia Avenue	Dead End	
Page	1.44	2.32	SR 629	Mount Zion Road	SR 642 (Stonyman Road)	
Patrick	4.79	7.71	Dead End	Trot Valley Road Central Academy Road	SR 8 (Woolwine Highway)	
Pittsylvania	38.29	61.62	US 29	Spring Garden Road Java Road Riceville Road Renan Road Wards Road	Campbell County Line	Gap between segments ending at different points along SR 668
Powhatan	0.31	0.50	Dead End	Old Confederate Cemetery Road	SR 607 (Huguenot Springs Road)	
Prince Edward	1.79	2.88	SR 696 (Green Bay Road)	Monroe Church Road	US 460 (Prince Edward Highway)	
Prince George	1.00	1.61	SR 639 (Flowerdew Hundred Road)	Powells Creek Road	Dead End	
Prince William	8.63	13.89	SR 234 (Dumfries Road)	Minnieville Road	SR 641 (Old Bridge Road)	
Pulaski	4.17	6.71	SR 674 (Pond Lick Hollow Road)	Brookmont Road Buena Vista Road	Dead End	Gap between segments ending at different points along SR 738
Rappahannock	5.34	8.59	Culpeper County Line	Forest Grove Road Battle Mountain Road	US 211 (Lee Highway)	Gap between segments ending at different points along SR 729
Richmond	2.50	4.02	SR 636 (Strangeway Road)	Sandys Lane	SR 624 (Newland Road)	
Roanoke	1.63	2.62	SR 642 (Alleghany Drive)	Givens Tyler Road Alleghany Drive	Salem City Limits	
Rockbridge	0.70	1.13	US 60	Edgar's Way	US 60	
Rockingham	4.50	7.24	US 33 (Spotswood Trail)	Model Road	Dead End	
Russell	39.22	63.12	Dead End	South Saint Paul Road Frosty Road Reeds Valley Road Middle Valley Road Jessees Mill Road Long Hollow Road River Mountain Road Clifton Farm Road	SR 770 (Old Highway 19)	Gap between segments ending at different points along SR 615 Gap between segments ending at different points along SR 82 Gap between segments ending at different points along SR 80
Scott	1.50	2.41	SR 714	Unnamed road	SR 614 (Yuma Road)	
Shenandoah	0.10	0.16	SR 601/SR 757	Habron Hollow Road	Dead End	
Smyth	0.50	0.80	SR 639 (Sulfur Springs Road)	Unnamed road	Dead End	
Southampton	3.20	5.15	SR 641 (Sedley Road)	Pond Branch Road Beaton Road Berea Church Road	SR 635 (Black Creek Road)	Gap between segments ending at different points along SR 638 Gap between segments ending at different points along SR 637
Spotsylvania	1.60	2.57	SR 3 (Plank Road)	Black Meadow Road	Dead End	
Stafford	0.23	0.37	Dead End	Porter Lane	SR 627 (Mountain View Road)	
Surry	1.05	1.69	SR 618 (Holybush Road)	Crosscreek Trail	Dead End	
Sussex	11.72	18.86	SR 642/FR-315	Briggs Road Dillard Road Unnamed road	SR 626 (Courthouse Road)	
Tazewell	0.37	0.60	US 19 (Trail of the Lonesome Pine)	Saint Clair Crossing	SR 650 (Tip Top Road/Wrights Valley Road)	
Warren	0.20	0.32	SR 735 (Bowman Hollow Road)	Bunker Hill Road	Frederick County Line	
Washington	5.67	9.12	SR 641 (Campground Road)	Benhams Road	SR 700 (Rich Valley Road)	
Westmoreland	6.07	9.77	Dead End	Layton Landing Road Grants Hill Church Road	SR 624 (Flat Iron Road)	
Wise	8.96	14.42	Wise Town Limits	Hurricane Road Unnamed road	SR 72	
Wythe	8.33	13.41	Old SR 94 (Scheffey School Road)	Piney Mountain Road Broadway Road Whippoorwill Road Barrett Mill Road	Wytheville Town Limits	
York	0.60	0.97	SR 641 (Penniman Road)	Water Country Parkway	Dead End	
