= Virginia State Route 600 =

State highway in Virginia, United States

State Route 600

Route information
- Maintained by VDOT

Location
- Country: United States
- State: Virginia

Highway system
- Virginia Routes; Interstate; US; Primary; Secondary; Byways; History; HOT lanes

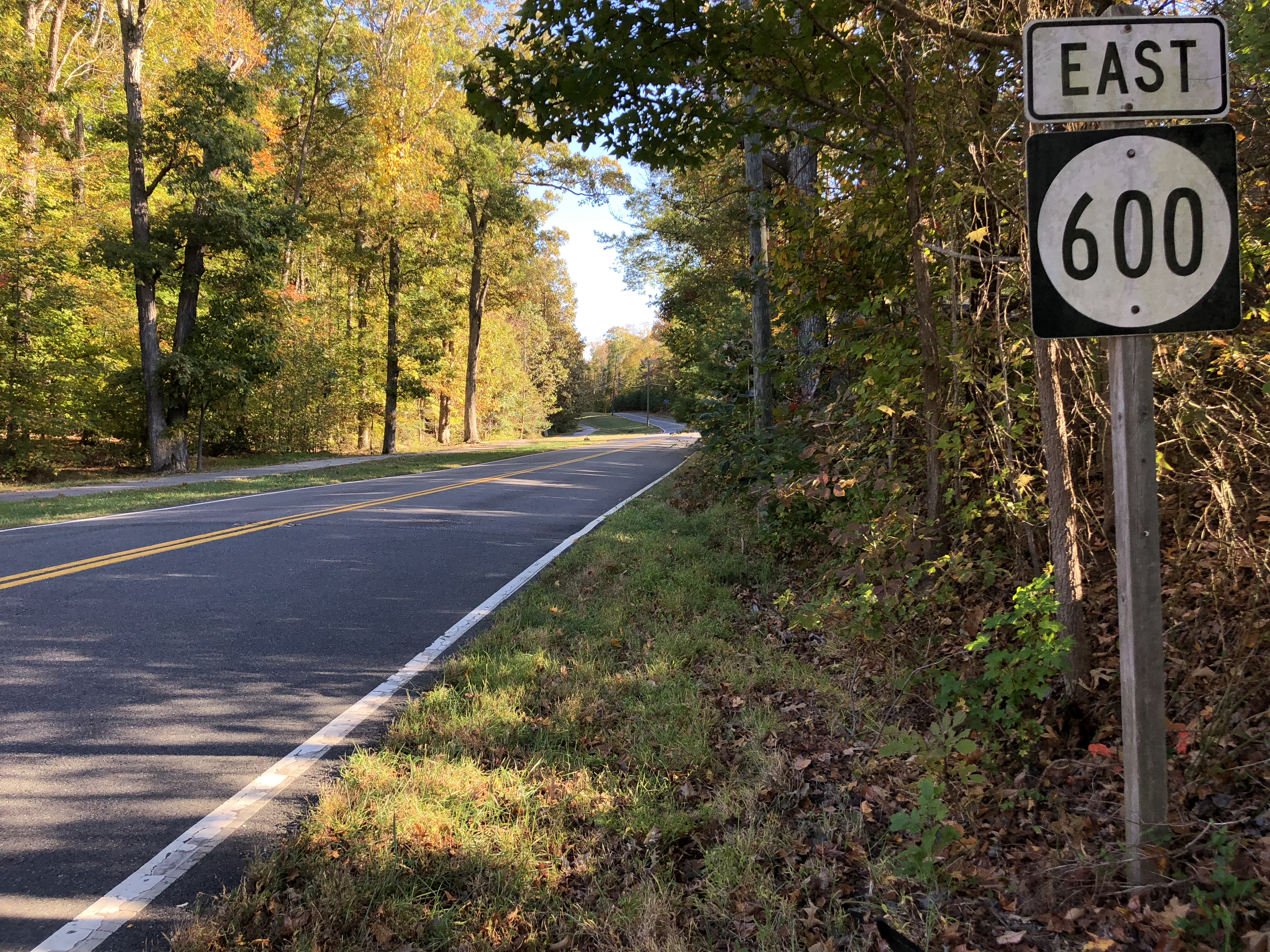
SR 600 in Fairfax County

State Route 600 (SR 600) in the U.S. state of Virginia is a secondary route designation applied to multiple discontinuous road segments among the many counties. The list below describes the sections in each county that are designated SR 600.

== List ==
County	Length (mi)	Length (km)	From	Via	To	Notes
Accomack	9.91	15.95	Northampton County Line	Seaside Road	SR 605 (Seaside Road/Drummontown Road)	
Albemarle	15.60	25.11	Louisa County Line	Campbell Road Cismont Lane Stony Point Pass Watts Passage	SR 641 (Burnley Station Road)	Gap between segments ending at different points on SR 20
Alleghany	27.83	44.79	SR 311 (Kanawha Trail)	Unnamed road Midland Trail Unnamed road	Dead End	Gap between US 60 and SR 159
Amelia	5.60	9.01	SR 622 (Church Road)	Ammon Road Burton Road Wilson Road	SR 622 (Greenes Road)	Gap between segments ending at different points on SR 610 Gap between segments ending at different points on SR 708
Amherst	6.49	10.44	US 60 (Richmond Highway)	Riverville Road	Dead End	
Appomattox	5.08	8.18	US 460 Bus	Swan Road	SR 627 (Hixburg Road)	
Augusta	9.94	16.00	Rockbridge County Line	Marble Valley Road	SR 629 (Deerfield Valley Road)	
Bath	21.98	35.37	SR 603 (Richardson Gorge)	Bolars Draft Road Big Back Creek	Highland County Line	Gap between segments ending at different points along SR 39
Bedford	3.20	5.15	SR 122 (Big Island Highway)	Peters Creek Road	US 501 (Lee Jackson Highway)	
Bland	2.60	4.18	Wythe County Line	Unnamed road	SR 601 (Little Creek Highway)	
Botetourt	14.70	23.66	Roanoke County Line	Little Catawba Creek Road Haymakertown Road Breckinridge Mill Road Grove Hill Road Hawthorne Hall Road	SR 668 (Mount Pleasant Church Road)	Gap between segments ending at different points along SR 779
Brunswick	5.29	8.51	SR 670 (Western Mill Road)	Manning Drive	Greensville County Line	
Buchanan	8.00	12.87	SR 80	Hurricane Creek Road	SR 620 (Indian Gap Road)	
Buckingham	7.17	11.54	Cumberland County Line	Plank Road Loop Road	US 15 (James Madison Highway)	
Campbell	13.54	21.79	SR 40 (Wickliffe Avenue)	Dog Creek Road Mount Calvary Road Sugar Hill Road	Charlotte County Line	Gap between segments ending at different points along SR 40
Caroline	7.72	12.42	SR 602	Frog Level Road	King William County Line	
Carroll	0.60	0.97	SR 638 (Bellspur Road)	Park View Drive	Patrick County Line	
Charles City	3.64	5.86	Henrico County Line	Charles City Road	SR 106 (Roxbury Road)	
Charlotte	0.60	0.97	Mecklenburg County Line	Pine Tree Road	SR 602 (Barnes Road)	
Chesterfield	3.69	5.94	Dinwiddie County Line	Pickett Avenue Matoaca Road	SR 626 (Woodpecker Road)	Gap between segments ending at different points along SR 36
Clarke	0.65	1.05	Dead End	Liberty Hall Lane	US 50 (John S Mosby Highway)	
Craig	3.24	5.21	West Virginia State Line	Unnamed Road	SR 311	
Culpeper	1.00	1.61	SR 3 (Germanna Highway)	York Road	SR 3 (Germanna Highway)	
Cumberland	27.75	44.66	US 60 (Anderson Highway)	Court House Circle Stoney Point Road River Road Plank Road	Buckingham County Line	Gap between segments ending at different points along US 60 Gap between segments crossing the Farmville corporate limits
Dickenson	10.30	16.58	Russell County Line	Wilder Road	Dead End	
Dinwiddie	1.41	2.27	SR 226 (Cox Road)	Feerndale Road	Chesterfield County Line	
Essex	3.11	5.01	Dead End	Sadler Hill Road Butylo Road	Middlesex County Line	
Fairfax	7.78	12.52	SR 123 (Ox Road)	Silverbrook Road Gunston Cove Road Gunston Road	Dead End	Gap between segments ending at different points along SR 642 Gap between a dead end and Gunston Hill Road Gap between US 1 and SR 242
Fauquier	6.26	10.07	SR 55 (John Marshall Highway)	Beverleys Mill Road Broad Run Church Road	SR 215 (Vint Hill Road)	
Floyd	1.90	3.06	Patrick County Line	Burnett Road Shelor Road	SR 758 (Buffalo Mountain Road)	Gap between segments ending at different points along SR 603
Fluvanna	8.60	13.84	SR 53 (Jefferson Highway)	South Boston Road North Boston Road Paynes Mill Road	US 250 (Richmond Road)	
Franklin	0.81	1.30	SR 890 (Snow Creek Road)	Adkins Road	Dead End	
Frederick	36.34	58.48	Shenandoah County Line	Zepp Road Oates Road Pifer Road Wardensville Grade Back Mountain Road Hayfield Road Siler Road Brush Creek Road Morgan Frederick Grade Reynolds Road	West Virginia State Line	Gap between segments ending at different points along SR 684
Gloucester	1.10	1.77	Dead End	Batt Road	SR 647 (Pierce Road)	
Goochland	8.40	13.52	Dead End	Rock Castle Road	SR 614 (Dogtown Road)	
Grayson	5.60	9.01	North Carolina State Line	Mud Creek Road Whitetop Road	Smyth County Line	Gap between segments ending at different points along US 58
Greene	0.55	0.89	SR 607 (Matthew Mill Road)	Shotwell Road Deane Road	US 29 (Seminole Trail)	Gap between SR 659 and a dead end
Greensville	4.90	7.89	Brunswick County Line	Barley Road Beef Road	North Carolina State Line	Gap between segments ending at different points along SR 627
Halifax	5.94	9.56	SR 92 (Clover Road)	Black Walnut Road	SR 746 (Mount Laurel Road)	
Hanover	0.07	0.11	Dead End	Glympse Road	SR 606 (Old Church Road)	
Henry	1.27	2.04	SR 647 (Mountain Valley Road)	Summerset Drive	Dead End	
Highland	15.18	24.43	Bath County Line	Lower Back Creek Road Unnamed road	US 250 (Highland Turnpike)	Gap between segments ending at different points along SR 84
Isle of Wight	13.07	21.03	US 460 (Windsor Boulevard)	Lovers Lane Deer Path Trail Blue Ridge Trail Woodland Drive Oliver Drive Cherry Grove Road	Suffolk City Limits	Gap between segments ending at different points along SR 603 Gap between segments ending at different points along SR 606 Gap between segments ending at different points along SR 637 Gap between segments ending at different points along SR 602 Gap between segments ending at the Suffolk City Limits
James City	2.85	4.59	SR 746 (Old Stage Road)	Six Mount Zion Road	New Kent County Line	
King and Queen	1.48	2.38	SR 616 (Mount Zion Road)	Pine Tree Road	SR 617 (Exol Road)	
King George	2.72	4.38	SR 218 (Caledon Road)	Passapatanzy Drive	Stafford County Line	
King William	23.84	38.37	SR 621 (Green Level Road)	River Road	Caroline County Line	Gap between segments ending at different points along SR 30
Lancaster	6.12	9.85	SR 3 (Mary Ball Road)	Courthouse Road Lara Road	Northumberland County Line	Gap between segments ending at different points along SR 201
Lee	5.97	9.61	SR 604 (AJ Osborne Highway)	Flower Gap Road	Scott County Line	
Loudoun	3.45	5.55	Prince William County Line	New Road Lenah Road	US 50 (John S Mosby Highway)	
Louisa	4.25	6.84	Albemarle County Line	Campbell Road	SR 627 (Zion Road)	
Lunenburg	3.20	5.15	SR 40	Chaple Road Varick Chapel Road	SR 627 (Mill Creek Drive)	Gap between segments ending at different points along SR 601
Madison	8.39	13.50	SR 670 (Old Blue Ridge Turnpike)	Bohannon Road Weakley Hollow Road Nethers Road	SR 707 (Pine Hill Road)	Gap between segments ending at different points along SR 643 Gap between segments ending at different points along the boundary of Shenandoah National Park
Mathews	2.72	4.38	Dead End	Point Road Circle Drive	SR 14 (John Clayton Memorial Highway)	Gap between segments ending at different points along SR 14
Mecklenburg	11.84	19.05	Charlotte County Line	Lawson Road Airport Road Cemetery Road Draper Road	SR 47	Gap between segments ending at different points along the Chase City Town Limits Gap between segments ending at different points along SR 671
Middlesex	0.20	0.32	Dead End	Butylo Road	Essex County Line	
Montgomery	11.27	18.14	SR 787/Floyd County Line	Piney Woods Road Tyler Road North Mud Pike Fire Tower Road	US 11 (Radford Road)	Gap between segments ending at different points along SR 693 Gap between segments ending at different points along SR 177 Gap between segments ending at different points along SR 666
Nelson	0.70	1.13	Dead End	Stage Coach Road	SR 6 (Afton Mountain Road)	
New Kent	5.20	8.37	James City County Line	Holly Fork Road	SR 273 (Farmers Drive)	
Northampton	32.51	52.32	Dead End	Seaside Road Seaside Drive	Accomack County Line	Formerly SR 186 Gap between segments ending at different points along SR 639
Northumberland	7.29	11.73	SR 604 (Dodlyt Road)	Ridge Road Gibeon Road	Westmoreland County Line	Gap between segments ending at different points along SR 612 Gap between segments ending at different points along US 360
Nottoway	5.22	8.40	SR 49 (The Falls Road)	Snead Spring Road	SR 625 (Courthouse Road)	
Orange	7.76	12.49	SR 629 (Lahore Road)	Kendall Road Mount Sharon Road	SR 615 (Rapidan Road)	Gap between segments ending at different points along SR 20
Page	0.60	0.97	Dead End	Batman Road	Rockingham County Line	
Patrick	2.75	4.43	SR 602 (Mayberry Church Road)	Maple Swamp Road Dairy Road Blacksmith Road	Floyd County Line	
Pittsylvania	1.30	2.09	SR 602 (Moons Road)	Cedar Forest Road	SR 761 (Straightstone Road)	
Powhatan	0.70	1.13	SR 621/SR 684	Saint Emma Drive	Dead End	
Prince Edward	5.22	8.40	US 460 (Prince Edward Highway)	Rices Depot Road Gulley Tavern Road	SR 617 (Saylers Creek Road)	
Prince George	1.77	2.85	SR 611 (Lebanon Road)	Ellis Road	Surry County Line	
Prince William	7.35	11.83	SR 601 (Waterfall Road)	Mountain Road	Loudoun County Line	
Pulaski	8.87	14.27	US 11 (Lee Highway)	Belspring Road Parrott River Road	Giles County Line	
Rappahannock	9.00	14.48	SR 681 (Rolling Road)	Woodward Road Bryans Road Thorton Gap Church Road Swindler Hollow Road Pickeral Ridge Lane	Dead End	Gap between SR 1001 and US 211 Gap between segments ending at different points along SR 671 Two gaps between segments ending at different points along SR 612
Richmond	5.65	9.09	Lancaster County Line	Ridge Road	Northumberland County Line	
Roanoke	1.20	1.93	SR 779 (Catawba Creek Road)	Moses Family Road	Botetourt County Line	
Rockbridge	6.96	11.20	SR 39 (Maury River Road)	Big River Road	Augusta County Line	
Rockingham	0.10	0.16	Page County Line	Batman Road	SR 601 (Rinacas Corner Road)	
Russell	9.53	15.34	SR 82	Ivy Ridge Road Gravel Lick Road Wilder Hollow	Dickenson County Line	
Scott	15.20	24.46	Lee County Line	Unnamed road Fairview Road	US 23/US 58/US 421	Gap between segments ending at different points along SR 622
Shenandoah	16.24	26.14	Dead End	Unnamed road Saumsville Road Zepp Road	Frederick County Line	Gap between segments ending at different points at the boundary of the George Washington National Forest
Smyth	14.50	23.34	Grayson County Line	Whitetop Road Riverside Road White Top Road	SR 762 (White Top Road)	
Southampton	9.72	15.64	Sussex County Line	Booth Road Doles Road	SR 635 (OBerry Church Road)	Gap between segments ending at different points along SR 616
Spotsylvania	1.80	2.90	SR 613 (Brock Road)	Herndon Road	SR 621 (Orange Plank Road)	
Stafford	3.00	4.83	SR 218/SR 602	Bethel Church Road	King George County Line	
Surry	1.20	1.93	SR 602 (Laurel Springs Road)	Montpelier Road	Prince George County Line	
Sussex	1.20	1.93	SR 628 (Courtland Road)	Unnamed road	Southampton County Line	
Tazewell	1.63	2.62	Tazewell Town Limits	Dial Rock Road	Dead End	
Warren	1.00	1.61	Dead End	Hickerson Hollow Road	SR 604 (Harmony Hollow Road)	
Washington	1.45	2.33	SR 726 (Chestnut Mountain Road)	Green Cove Road	US 58 (Jeb Stuart Highway)	
Westmoreland	12.21	19.65	SR 202 (Cople Highway)	Neenah Road Nomini Grove Road Nomini Hall Road Ebenezer Church Road	Northumberland County Line	Gap between segments ending at different points along SR 621
Wise	0.77	1.24	SR 78	Stonega Road	Dead End	
Wythe	16.9	27.20	US 52 (Stoney Fork Road)	Laurel Run Akers Road Rose Hill Road Unnamed road Sharitz Road Unnamed road Saint Lukes Road Unnamed road	Bland County Line	Gap between segments ending at different points along SR 659 Gap between segments ending at different points along SR 603
York	2.96	4.76	Hampton City Limits	Big Bethel Road Tide Mill Road	Dead End	Gap between segments ending at different points along SR 706
