= National Register of Historic Places listings in Montgomery County, Virginia =

Location of Montgomery County in Virginia

This is a list of the National Register of Historic Places listings in Montgomery County, Virginia.

This is intended to be a complete list of the properties and districts on the National Register of Historic Places in Montgomery County, Virginia, United States. The locations of National Register properties and districts for which the latitude and longitude coordinates are included below, may be seen in an online map.

There are 71 properties and districts listed on the National Register in the county. Another 4 properties were once listed but have been removed.

This National Park Service list is complete through NPS recent listings posted May 1, 2026.

== Current listings ==
	Name on the Register	Image	Date listed	Location	City or town	Description
1	Alleghany Springs Springhouse	Alleghany Springs Springhouse	November 13, 1989 (#89001807)	Alleghany Spring Rd. 37°07′40″N 80°15′51″W	Alleghany Springs	
2	Amiss-Palmer House	Amiss-Palmer House	November 13, 1989 (#89001804)	Mountain View Dr. and Penn St. off Eakin St. 37°13′36″N 80°24′26″W	Blacksburg	
3	Barnett House	Barnett House	November 13, 1989 (#89001810)	U.S. Routes 11/460, 0.3 miles (0.48 km) south of their junction with Brake Rd. 37°12′39″N 80°14′00″W	Elliston	
4	William Barnett House	William Barnett House	November 13, 1989 (#89001806)	Off Alleghany Spring Rd., 0.1 miles (0.16 km) north of Georges Run Rd. 37°08′36″N 80°16′02″W	Alleghany Springs	
5	Barracks No. 1	Barracks No. 1	November 19, 2014 (#14000947)	280 Alumni Mall; 37°13′51″N 80°25′11″W	Blacksburg	Lane Hall on the Virginia Tech campus
6	Big Spring Baptist Church	Big Spring Baptist Church	November 13, 1989 (#89001809)	Brake Rd., 0.1 miles (0.16 km) east of U.S. Routes 11/460; 37°12′56″N 80°13′29″W	Elliston	
7	Bishop House	Bishop House	November 13, 1989 (#89001812)	0.1 miles (0.16 km) north of the junction of Graysontown and Lead Mine Rds. 37°02′17″N 80°33′19″W	Graysontown	
8	Blacksburg Historic District	Blacksburg Historic District	January 31, 1991 (#90002165)	Roughly the area north of the junction of Main and Jackson Sts., including sections out along Lee and Progress Sts. 37°13′51″N 80°24′48″W	Blacksburg	
9	Blacksburg Motor Company, Inc.	Blacksburg Motor Company, Inc.	February 21, 2008 (#08000074)	400 S. Main St. 37°13′37″N 80°24′42″W	Blacksburg	
10	Blankenship Farm	Blankenship Farm	November 13, 1989 (#89001808)	0.4 miles (0.64 km) south of the junction of Ellett and Sweeny Rds. 37°11′05″N 80°21′51″W	Ellett	
11	Bowstring Truss Bridge	Bowstring Truss Bridge	January 2, 2013 (#12001136)	Ironto Rest Area on Interstate 81; 37°14′21″N 80°13′28″W	Ironto	
12	Bowyer-Trollinger Farm	Bowyer-Trollinger Farm	February 1, 1991 (#90002167)	Tyler Rd., north of its junction with Childress Rd. 37°04′02″N 80°30′24″W	Childress	
13	Pompey Callaway House	Pompey Callaway House	November 13, 1989 (#89001811)	Calloway St., 0.2 miles (0.32 km) east of U.S. Routes 11/460; 37°13′00″N 80°13′48″W	Elliston	
14	Cambria Freight Station	Cambria Freight Station	December 12, 1985 (#85003351)	630 Depot St. 37°08′29″N 80°24′17″W	Christiansburg	
15	Cambria Historic District	Cambria Historic District	January 10, 1991 (#90002002)	500-600 blocks of Depot St., the 500-600 blocks of Montgomery St., the 900-1000 blocks of Cambria St., and railroad depots 37°08′35″N 80°24′19″W	Christiansburg	
16	James Charlton Farm	James Charlton Farm	November 13, 1989 (#89001816)	Mud Pike east of State Route 177; 37°05′50″N 80°29′49″W	Radford	
17	Christiansburg Downtown Historic District	Christiansburg Downtown Historic District	May 28, 2013 (#13000340)	E. and W. Main St., and N. and S. Franklin St. 37°07′47″N 80°24′31″W	Christiansburg	Thirty-two contributing buildings, one contributing site, and two contributing objects.
18	Christiansburg Presbyterian Church	Christiansburg Presbyterian Church	January 30, 1978 (#78003031)	107 W. Main St. 37°07′43″N 80°24′39″W	Christiansburg	
19	Crockett Springs Cottage	Crockett Springs Cottage	November 13, 1989 (#89001814)	1 mile (1.6 km) south of the junction of Alleghany Spring and Fishers View Rds. 37°05′38″N 80°15′07″W	Piedmont	
20	Cromer House	Cromer House	November 13, 1989 (#89001893)	Off Dry Valley Rd., 0.25 miles (0.40 km) east of Childress Rd. 37°03′07″N 80°31′34″W	Childress	
21	Currie House	Currie House	September 14, 1994 (#94000549)	1105 Highland Circle; 37°13′26″N 80°23′38″W	Blacksburg	
22	Earhart House	Earhart House	November 13, 1989 (#89001801)	Lusters Gate Rd., 0.3 miles (0.48 km) north of Sweeny Rd. 37°11′45″N 80°21′58″W	Ellett	
23	George Earhart House	George Earhart House	November 13, 1989 (#89001886)	Lusters Gate Rd., just north of Taylor Hollow Rd. 37°12′26″N 80°21′43″W	New Ellett	
24	East Main Street Historic District	East Main Street Historic District	January 10, 1991 (#90002008)	E. Main St. from Roanoke and Pepper Sts. to the old high school, and Park St. from E. Main to Lester St. 37°07′58″N 80°24′19″W	Christiansburg	
25	Edgemont Church	Edgemont Church	November 13, 1989 (#89001902)	Mud Pike, 1 mile (1.6 km) east of Violet Dr. 37°06′28″N 80°28′44″W	Christiansburg	
26	Evans House No. 2	Evans House No. 2	November 13, 1989 (#89001890)	Prices Fork Rd., 0.5 miles (0.80 km) west of Merrimac Rd. 37°12′50″N 80°28′41″W	Prices Fork	
27	Fotheringay	Fotheringay	November 12, 1969 (#69000262)	South of the junction of U.S. Route 11 and Brake Rd. 37°11′45″N 80°13′51″W	Elliston	
28	Nealy Gordon Farm	Nealy Gordon Farm	November 13, 1989 (#89001805)	Off Thacler Rd., 0.5 miles (0.80 km) south of the junction with North Fork Rd. 37°11′40″N 80°18′07″W	Brush Harbor	
29	John Grayson House	John Grayson House	November 13, 1989 (#89001896)	0.5 miles (0.80 km) northeast of the Graysontown Rd. bridge over the Little River; 37°02′53″N 80°33′27″W	Graysontown	
30	Grayson-Gravely House	Grayson-Gravely House	November 13, 1989 (#89001813)	Graysontown Rd. at the Little River bridge 37°02′36″N 80°33′45″W	Graysontown	
31	Graysontown Methodist Church	Graysontown Methodist Church	November 13, 1989 (#89001889)	Graysontown Rd. 37°02′14″N 80°33′38″W	Graysontown	
32	Guerrant House	Guerrant House	November 13, 1989 (#89001815)	High Rock Hill Rd. at Old Pike Rd. 37°03′15″N 80°21′29″W	Pilot	
33	Thomas Hall House	Thomas Hall House	November 13, 1989 (#89001898)	Tyler Rd., 0.5 miles (0.80 km) southeast of Stanley Rd. 37°04′40″N 80°30′43″W	Childress	
34	Hornbarger Store	Hornbarger Store	November 13, 1989 (#89001888)	Vicker Switch Rd., 0.1 miles (0.16 km) east of Switchback Rd. 37°09′50″N 80°29′09″W	Vicker	
35	Howard-Bell-Feather House	Howard-Bell-Feather House	November 13, 1989 (#89001887)	Union Valley Rd. at Elliott Creek; 37°04′01″N 80°24′32″W	Riner	
36	Keister House	Keister House	November 13, 1989 (#89001880)	607 Giles Rd. 37°14′25″N 80°25′01″W	Blacksburg	
37	Kentland Farm Historic and Archeological District	Kentland Farm Historic and Archeological District	July 3, 1991 (#91000833)	At the end of Whitethorne Rd. along the New River; also the western terminus of Whitethorne Rd. 37°11′42″N 80°34′46″W	Blacksburg	Whitethorne Road represents a boundary increase of September 6, 2006
38	Michael Kinzer House	Michael Kinzer House	November 13, 1989 (#89001901)	Linwood Ln. 37°14′02″N 80°27′31″W	Blacksburg	
39	Lafayette Historic District	Lafayette Historic District	January 10, 1991 (#90002005)	Roughly High St. from Main to Washington Sts., Main from High to Water Sts., and Church St. from Main to Washington; 37°14′07″N 80°12′39″W	Lafayette	
40	Frank Lawrence House	Frank Lawrence House	November 13, 1989 (#89001897)	High Rock Hill Rd., 0.2 miles (0.32 km) east of Tanbark Rd. 37°03′08″N 80°19′05″W	Basham	
41	Linkous-Kipps House	Linkous-Kipps House	November 13, 1989 (#89001885)	Merrimac Rd. 37°12′27″N 80°27′31″W	Merrimac	
42	Edgar A. Long Building	Edgar A. Long Building	March 5, 2001 (#01000149)	140 Scattergood Dr. 37°08′33″N 80°25′03″W	Christiansburg	
43	Madison Farm Historic and Archeological District	Madison Farm Historic and Archeological District	January 25, 1991 (#90002190)	Eastern and western sides of U.S. Route 460 north of the junction with Dark Run Rd. 37°11′01″N 80°14′06″W	Elliston	
44	Joseph McDonald Farm	Joseph McDonald Farm	February 1, 1991 (#90002166)	Walnut Spring Rd., northwest of the junction with Prices Fork Rd., at the end of a spur road 37°13′36″N 80°28′27″W	Prices Fork	
45	Miller-Southside Residential Historic District	Miller-Southside Residential Historic District	January 11, 1991 (#90002110)	Roughly bounded by Miller St., S. Main St., Airport Rd., and Preston Ave. 37°13′18″N 80°24′26″W	Blacksburg	
46	Montgomery Primitive Baptist Church	Montgomery Primitive Baptist Church	November 13, 1989 (#89001803)	Triangle St., southwest of the junction with U.S. Route 460 Business; 37°11′02″N 80°24′39″W	Merrimac	
47	North Fork Valley Rural Historic District	North Fork Valley Rural Historic District	February 1, 1991 (#90002169)	Along the North Fork of the Roanoke River from the Roanoke County line south to Lusters Gate; 37°15′51″N 80°19′49″W	Blacksburg	
48	The Oaks	The Oaks	July 15, 1994 (#94000709)	311 E. Main St. 37°08′00″N 80°24′16″W	Christiansburg	
49	Odd Fellows Hall	Odd Fellows Hall	July 27, 2005 (#05000770)	203 Gilbert St. 37°14′04″N 80°25′15″W	Blacksburg	
50	Old Christiansburg Industrial Institute	Old Christiansburg Industrial Institute	April 6, 1979 (#79003056)	570 High St. 37°08′21″N 80°24′20″W	Christiansburg	
51	Phillips-Ronald House	Phillips-Ronald House	November 13, 1989 (#89001904)	Draper Rd. at Washington St. 37°13′37″N 80°24′49″W	Blacksburg	
52	Phlegar Building	Phlegar Building	November 13, 1989 (#89001892)	2 S. Franklin St. 37°07′46″N 80°24′29″W	Christiansburg	
53	Piedmont Camp Meeting Grounds Historic District	Piedmont Camp Meeting Grounds Historic District	January 10, 1991 (#90002003)	Junction of Jewell Dr. and Miles Rd. 37°06′13″N 80°13′00″W	Piedmont	
54	Pilot School	Pilot School	February 7, 2024 (#100009956)	4449 Brush Creek Road /Route 617; 37°03′02″N 80°21′43″W	Pilot	
55	Prices Fork Historic District	Prices Fork Historic District	January 10, 1991 (#90002004)	Prices Fork Rd. from Thomas Lane roughly to Brooksfield Rd.; also Prices Fork Rd. 37°12′35″N 80°29′27″W	Prices Fork	Second location represents a boundary increase of August 25, 2014
56	Rife House	Rife House	November 13, 1989 (#89001900)	U.S. Routes 11/460 at Dark Run Rd. 37°10′38″N 80°14′12″W	Shawsville	
57	Riner Historic District	Riner Historic District	January 10, 1991 (#90002006)	Roughly east and south of the junction of Main and Franklin Sts. 37°04′00″N 80°26′24″W	Riner	
58	Shawsville Historic District	Shawsville Historic District	January 10, 1991 (#90002009)	Main St. east and west of the junction with Alleghany Spring Rd. 37°10′08″N 80°15′16″W	Shawsville	
59	Slusser-Ryan Farm	Slusser-Ryan Farm	August 28, 2017 (#100001514)	2028 Mt. Tabor Rd. 37°17′03″N 80°23′16″W	Blacksburg	
60	Smithfield	Smithfield	November 12, 1969 (#69000261)	West of Blacksburg; 37°13′05″N 80°25′55″W	Blacksburg	
61	Solitude	Solitude	May 5, 1989 (#89000363)	Greenhouse Rd. on the Virginia Tech campus 37°13′34″N 80°25′37″W	Blacksburg	
62	South Franklin Street Historic District	South Franklin Street Historic District	January 10, 1991 (#90002007)	100-308 S. Franklin St. 37°07′40″N 80°24′22″W	Christiansburg	
63	Surface House	Surface House	November 13, 1989 (#89001883)	High St., east of Depot St. 37°08′21″N 80°24′29″W	Christiansburg	
64	Trinity United Methodist Church	Trinity United Methodist Church	November 13, 1989 (#89001894)	Ellett Rd., 0.1 miles (0.16 km) south of Sweeny Rd. 37°11′19″N 80°22′06″W	Ellett	
65	US Post Office-Christiansburg	US Post Office-Christiansburg	February 1, 1991 (#90002168)	Northwestern corner of the public square 37°07′49″N 80°24′33″W	Christiansburg	
66	Virginian Railway Underpass	Virginian Railway Underpass	November 13, 1989 (#89001903)	Junction of the Norfolk Southern railroad tracks and Lusters Gate Rd., south of New Ellett; 37°11′58″N 80°21′50″W	New Ellett	
67	Adam Wall House	Adam Wall House	November 13, 1989 (#89001891)	Merrimac Rd., 0.5 miles (0.80 km) south of Prices Fork Rd. 37°12′28″N 80°28′03″W	Prices Fork	
68	Walnut Grove Farm	Walnut Grove Farm	January 17, 1991 (#89001899)	Boners Run Rd., 0.2 miles (0.32 km) southeast of U.S. Routes 11/U.S. Route 460; 37°10′06″N 80°14′49″W	Shawsville	
69	Walnut Spring	Walnut Spring	November 13, 1989 (#89001878)	Glade Rd., 0.5 miles (0.80 km) east of the junction with Brooksfield Rd. 37°13′41″N 80°29′22″W	Kanodes Mill	
70	Whitethorn	Whitethorn	November 13, 1989 (#89001879)	Tall Oaks Dr. 37°12′30″N 80°27′04″W	Blacksburg	
71	Yellow Sulphur Springs	Yellow Sulphur Springs	September 20, 1979 (#79003057)	North of Christiansburg on Yellow Sulphur Rd. 37°10′44″N 80°23′52″W	Christiansburg	

== Former listings ==
	Name on the Register	Image	Date listed	Date removed	Location	City or town	Description
1	Bridge over North Fork of Roanoke River		January 10, 1991 (#89001802)	March 19, 2001	South of the junction of VA 637 and 603 over North Fork of Roanoke River	Ironto	Bridge removed in 1995
2	Harrison-Hancock Hardware Company Building		November 13, 1989 (#89001877)	March 19, 2001	24 E. Main St	Christiansburg	Demolished in 1995
3	Montgomery White Sulphur Springs Cottage		November 13, 1989 (#89001884)	March 19, 2001	Depot and New Streets	Christiansburg	Demolished in 1995
4	Elijah Murdock Farm		November 13, 1989 (#89001882)	March 19, 2001	Off VA 643, 1 mile (1.6 km) north of US 460	Yellow Sulphur	Demolished

== See also ==
- List of National Historic Landmarks in Virginia
- National Register of Historic Places listings in Virginia
- National Register of Historic Places listings in Radford, Virginia
