= Amiss =

Amiss is a surname. Notable people with the surname include:

- Audrey Amiss (1933–2013), British artist
- Dennis Amiss (born 1943), English cricketer and cricket administrator
- Jye Amiss (born 2003), Australian rules footballer

== See also ==
- Amiss-Palmer House, historic home in Virginia
