= Madison Farm Historic and Archeological District =

Archaeological site in Virginia, United States

- U.S. National Register of Historic Places
- U.S. Historic district
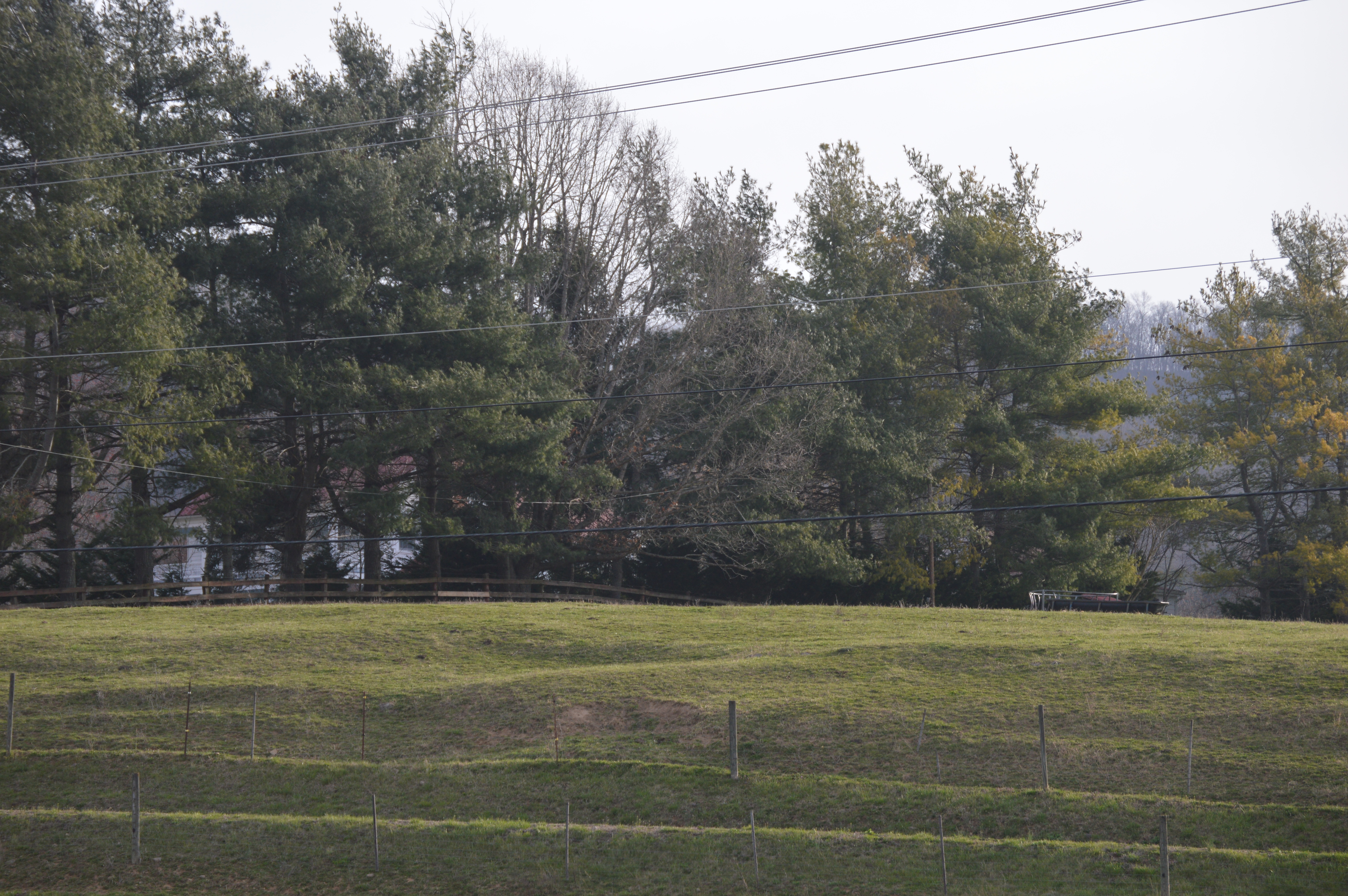
- Field and farmhouse, seen from U.S. Routes 11/460

- Location within Virginia Location within the United States
- Nearest city: Elliston, Virginia
- Area: 115 acres (47 ha)
- Architectural style: Hall-parlor plan
- MPS: Montgomery County MPS
- NRHP reference No.: 90002190
- Added to NRHP: January 25, 1991

The Madison Farm Historic and Archeological District is a complex of historic and prehistoric Native American and colonial sites in rural Montgomery County, Virginia. It is located in and near the flood plains of the South Fork of the Roanoke River, and covers 115 acres (47 ha). Its historic artifacts include a surviving hall-parlor log house, probably built late in the 18th century by William Madison, which is one of the few of its type to survive in the county. The building was substantially modified in the 19th century, refinishing the interior and adding a two-story porch. The farm site includes a number of historic outbuildings (or remnants of same), and is a good prospect for archaeological investigation into period farming practices.

The farm is also the site of two prehistoric Native American sites. One, designated 44MY37 and known as the Marye Site, is a significant Late Woodland Period village site, at which evidence of Archaic period occupation has also been found. Investigation of this site is believed to be important in yielding further understanding of Native American life in the area.

The district was listed on the National Register of Historic Places in 1991.

== See also ==
- National Register of Historic Places listings in Montgomery County, Virginia
