= Slusser-Ryan Farm =

- U.S. National Register of Historic Places
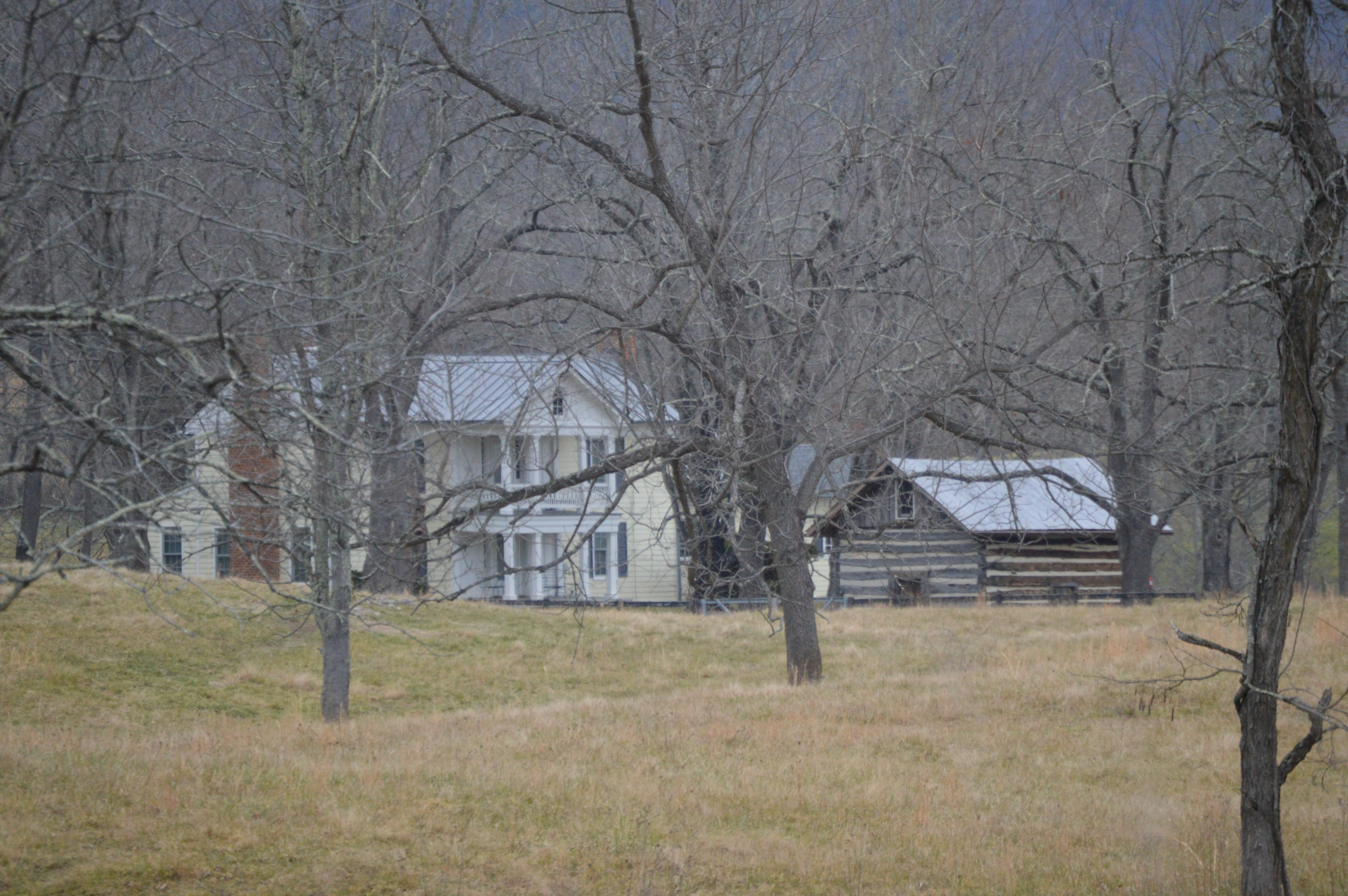
- Farmhouse and 1870 log outbuilding

- Location within Virginia Location within the United States
- Location: 2028 Mt. Tabor Rd., near Blacksburg, Virginia
- Coordinates: 37°17′3″N 80°23′16″W
- Area: 110 acres (45 ha)
- Built: 1910
- NRHP reference No.: 100001514
- Added to NRHP: August 28, 2017

The Slusser-Ryan Farm is a historic farm at 2028 Mount Tabor Road in rural Montgomery County, Virginia, about 4 miles (6.4 km) northeast of Blacksburg. The main farm complex includes a house whose core elements are log structures built beginning in 1855, and later enlarged with frame structures. It has a variety of well-preserved exterior and interior 19th-century finishes that are stylistically eclectic. Outbuildings include a 19th-century pumphouse and privy, and there is a small 19th-century coal mine on the property. The latter was probably used by the farm's owners for local use.

The farm was listed on the National Register of Historic Places in 2017.

== See also ==
- National Register of Historic Places listings in Montgomery County, Virginia
