= Elijah Murdock Farm =

Historic house in Virginia, United States

- Formerly listed on the U.S. National Register of Historic Places
- Virginia Landmarks Register
- Nearest city: Off VA 643, 1 mile (1.6 km) north of US 460, near Yellow Sulphur, Virginia
- Area: less than one acre
- Architectural style: Hall-parlor plan
- MPS: Montgomery County MPS
- NRHP reference No.: 89001882
- VLR No.: 060-0547

Significant dates
- Added to NRHP: 1989
- Designated VLR
- Removed from NRHP: March 19, 2001

Elijah Murdock Farm was a historic home located near Yellow Sulphur, Montgomery County, Virginia. The main dwelling was a two-story, three-bay, hall-parlor-plan dwelling with a two-story log and frame ell. Also on the property was a contributing washhouse of weatherboarded frame construction, a double-crib log corn crib, a board-and-batten-sided frame outbuilding, and the site of a spring house.

The farmstead was listed on the National Register partly for its architecture and also for the site's archeological potential: it was deemed "an excellent example of a relatively undisturbed historic farmstead" with likely valuable deposits relating to occupation and use of the farmstead in the 1800s.

It was listed on the National Register of Historic Places in 1989.

The house has been demolished.

The site was delisted from the National Register in 2001.

Elijah Gilbert Murdock was born in Bedford County, Virginia, in roughly 1785. Elijah was a veteran of the War of 1812, and his father, Joseph Murdock, fought in the 8th Virginia Regiment of the Continental Army beginning in 1777.

Tax records from 1816 indicate the sale of 184 acres in Bedford County, Virginia, by Elijah Murdock likely inherited after the passing of his father Joseph Murdock in the year’s prior. The 1820 and 1830 Censuses continued to list Elijah and his family in Bedford County. By the 1840 Census, Elijah had moved westward into Montgomery County, where he lived until his passing.
