= North Fork Valley Rural Historic District =

Historic district in Virginia, United States

- U.S. National Register of Historic Places
- U.S. Historic district
- Virginia Landmarks Register
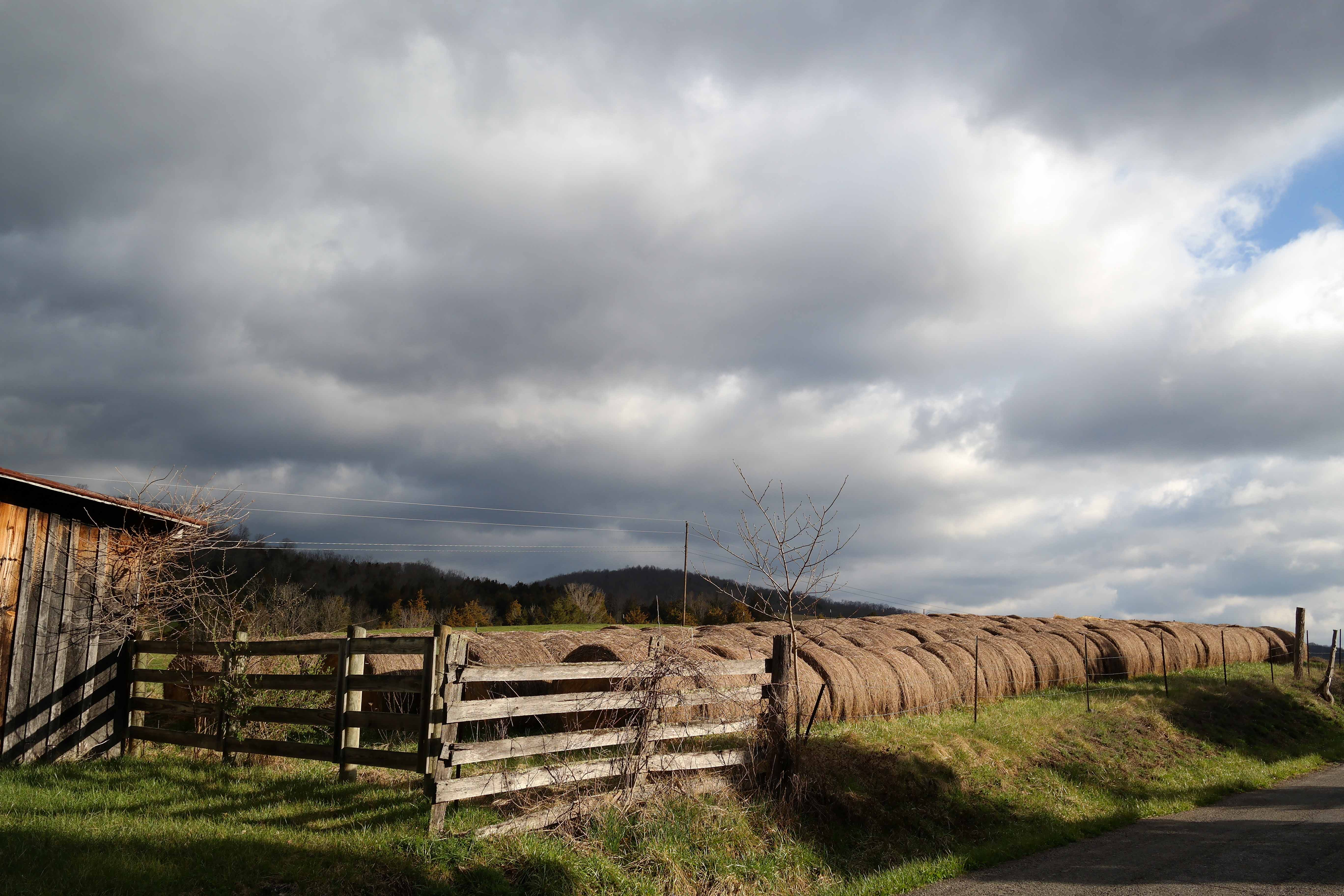
- Rolls of straw in the North Fork Valley Rural Historic District

- Location within Virginia Location within the United States
- Location: Along the North Fork of the Roanoke R. from the Roanoke Co. line S to Lusters Gate, Blacksburg, Virginia
- Coordinates: 37°15′58″N 80°18′56″W
- Area: 10,200 acres (4,100 ha)
- Architectural style: Greek Revival, Center-passage plan
- MPS: Montgomery County MPS
- NRHP reference No.: 90002169
- VLR No.: 060-0574

Significant dates
- Added to NRHP: February 1, 1991
- Designated VLR: June 20, 1989

North Fork Valley Rural Historic District is a national historic district located near Blacksburg, Montgomery County, Virginia. The district encompasses 125 contributing buildings, 5 contributing sites, and 18 contributing structures. It consists of a significant rural landscape and an important collection of domestic and agricultural buildings, reflecting important agricultural practices in the region from 1745–1940. It includes domestic and agricultural buildings, a historic archaeological site, as well as an early-20th century school, two late-19th century churches, and five mid- to late-19th century industrial resources including three standing mills, a tanyard site, and a brick kiln site.

It was listed on the National Register of Historic Places in 1991.
