= Walnut Spring =

Historic house in Virginia, United States

- U.S. National Register of Historic Places
- Virginia Landmarks Register
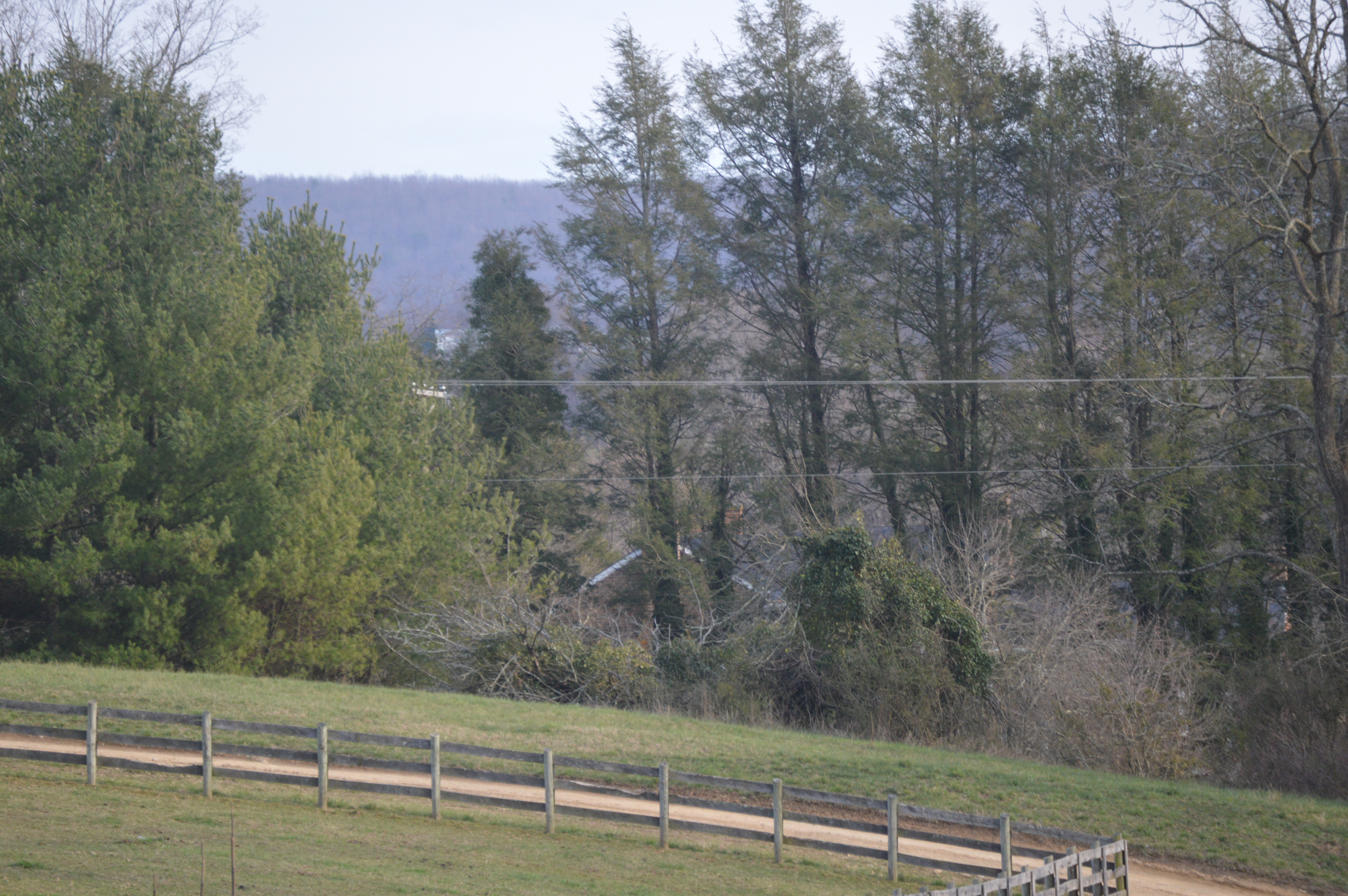
- Distant view through the trees

- Location within Virginia Location within the United States
- Location: VA 655, 0.5 miles (0.80 km) east of the junction with VA 654, near Kanodes Mill, Virginia
- Coordinates: 37°13′41″N 80°29′23″W
- Area: 2 acres (0.81 ha)
- Architectural style: Single-pile center-passage
- MPS: Montgomery County MPS
- NRHP reference No.: 89001878
- VLR No.: 060-0243

Significant dates
- Added to NRHP: November 13, 1989
- Designated VLR: June 20, 1989

Walnut Spring is a historic home located near Kanodes Mill, Montgomery County, Virginia. The house is a large, two-story, gable-roofed, dwelling with a single pile central passage plan. It was built in the period 1830–1865. It has a long appendage to the rear made up of connected outbuildings. It features gable ends finished with tapered rake boards with decorative sawn ends and a box cornice detailed with a simple flat, stepped, or corbeled form.

It was listed on the National Register of Historic Places in 1989.
