= Hornbarger Store =

Historic commercial building in Virginia, United States

- U.S. National Register of Historic Places
- Virginia Landmarks Register
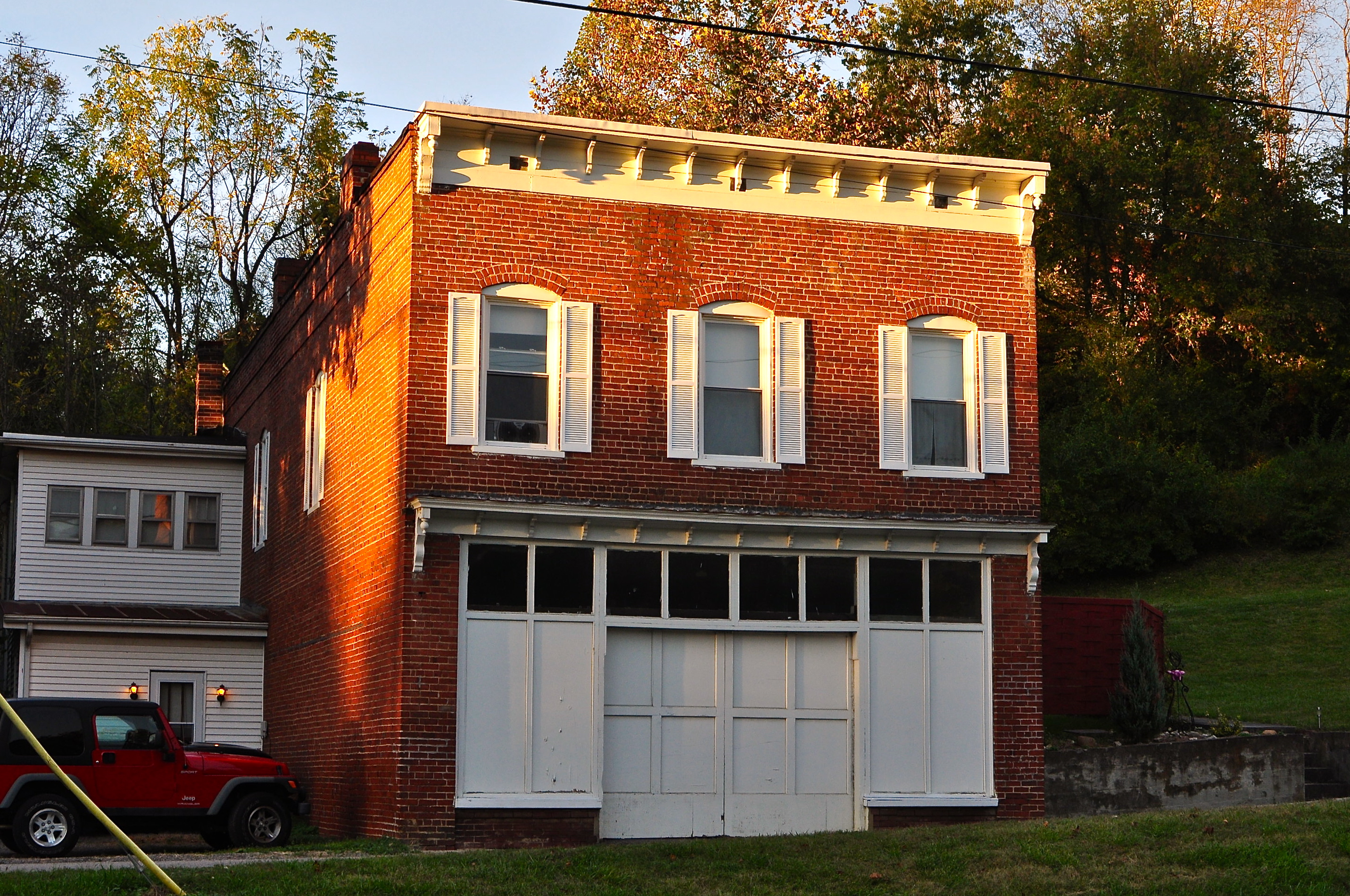
- Hornbarger Store, October 2013

- Location within Virginia Location within the United States
- Location: VA 659, 0.1 mi. E of VA 719, Vicker, Virginia
- Coordinates: 37°9′50″N 80°29′10″W
- Area: less than one acre
- Built: 1910-1911
- MPS: Montgomery County MPS
- NRHP reference No.: 89001888
- VLR No.: 060-0153

Significant dates
- Added to NRHP: November 13, 1989
- Designated VLR: June 20, 1989

Hornbarger Store is a historic general store located at Vicker, Montgomery County, Virginia. It was built in 1910–1911, and is a two-story, three-bay, rectangular brick commercial building. It has a parapet shed roof, segmentally arched one-over-one double-hung sash windows, and wood bracketed cornices. Also on the property is a contributing board-and-batten hipped roof outbuilding.

It was listed on the National Register of Historic Places in 1989.
