= Harrison-Hancock Hardware Company Building =

Historic commercial building in Virginia, United States

- Formerly listed on the U.S. National Register of Historic Places
- Virginia Landmarks Register
- Location: 24 E. Main St., Christiansburg, Virginia
- Area: less than one acre
- Built: 1910
- MPS: Montgomery County MPS
- NRHP reference No.: 89001877
- VLR No.: 154-0029

Significant dates
- Added to NRHP: 1989
- Designated VLR
- Removed from NRHP: March 19, 2001

Harrison-Hancock Hardware Company Building was a historic commercial building located at Christiansburg, Montgomery County, Virginia. It was built in 1910, and was a 3 1/2-story, concrete-masonry building with a shed roof. It featured a stepped parapet and a front parapet with cornice. It was demolished for a parking lot in 1995–1996.

It was listed on the National Register of Historic Places in 1989, and delisted in 2001.
