= Michael Kinzer House =

Historic house in Virginia, United States

- U.S. National Register of Historic Places
- Virginia Landmarks Register
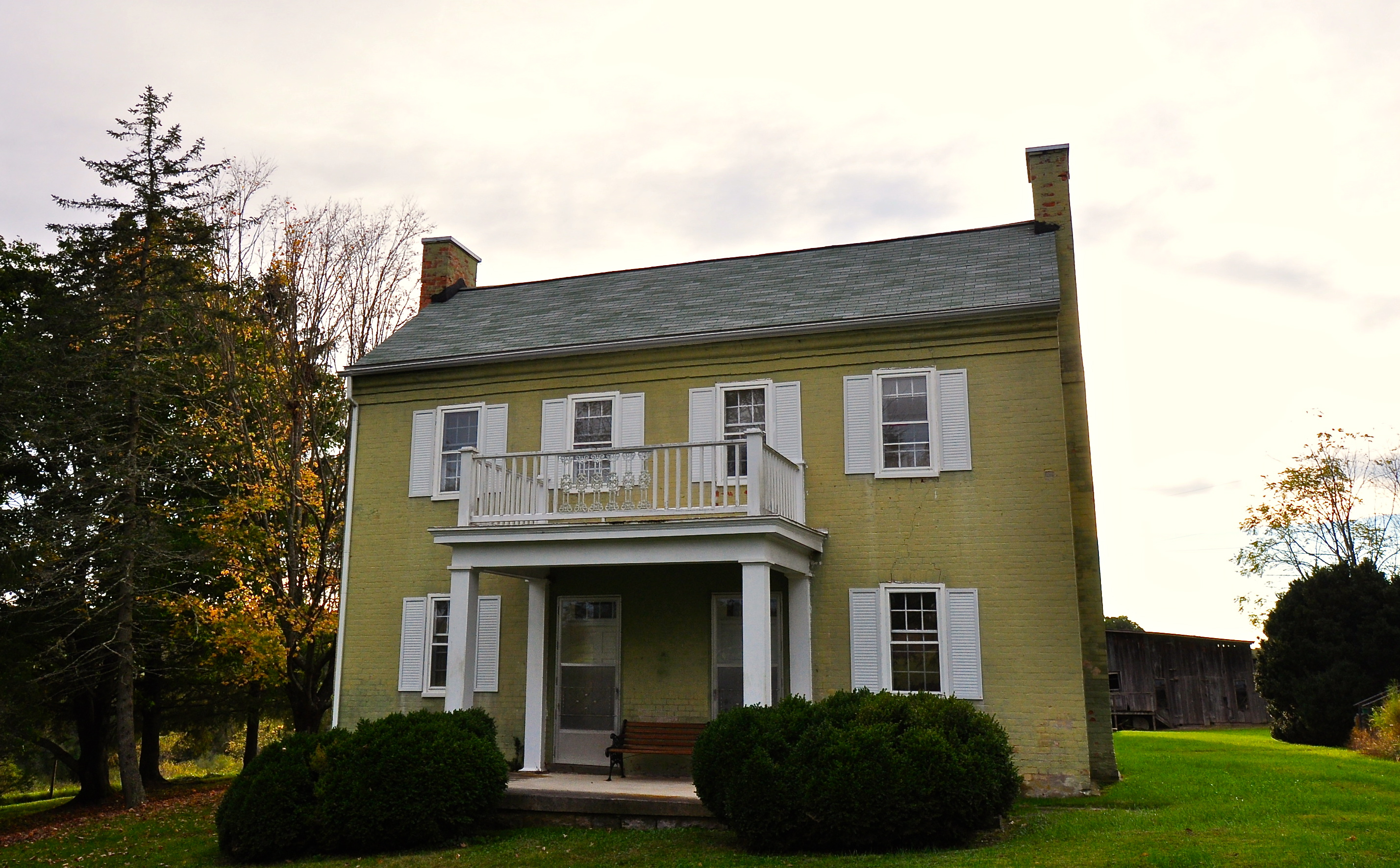
- Michael Kinzer House, October 2013

- Location within Virginia Location within the United States
- Location: 2001 Linwood Lane, Blacksburg, Virginia
- Coordinates: 37°14′1″N 80°27′32″W
- Area: less than one acre
- Built: c. 1845
- Architectural style: Two-room plan
- MPS: Montgomery County MPS
- NRHP reference No.: 89001901
- VLR No.: 150-5024

Significant dates
- Added to NRHP: November 13, 1989
- Designated VLR: June 20, 1989

Michael Kinzer House is a historic home located at Blacksburg, Montgomery County, Virginia. It was built about 1845, and is a two-story, four-bay brick two-room-plan house. It features a decorative brick cornice. Also on the property is the contributing site of a brick kiln.

It was listed on the National Register of Historic Places in 1989.
