= Virginian Railway Underpass =

- U.S. National Register of Historic Places
- Virginia Landmarks Register
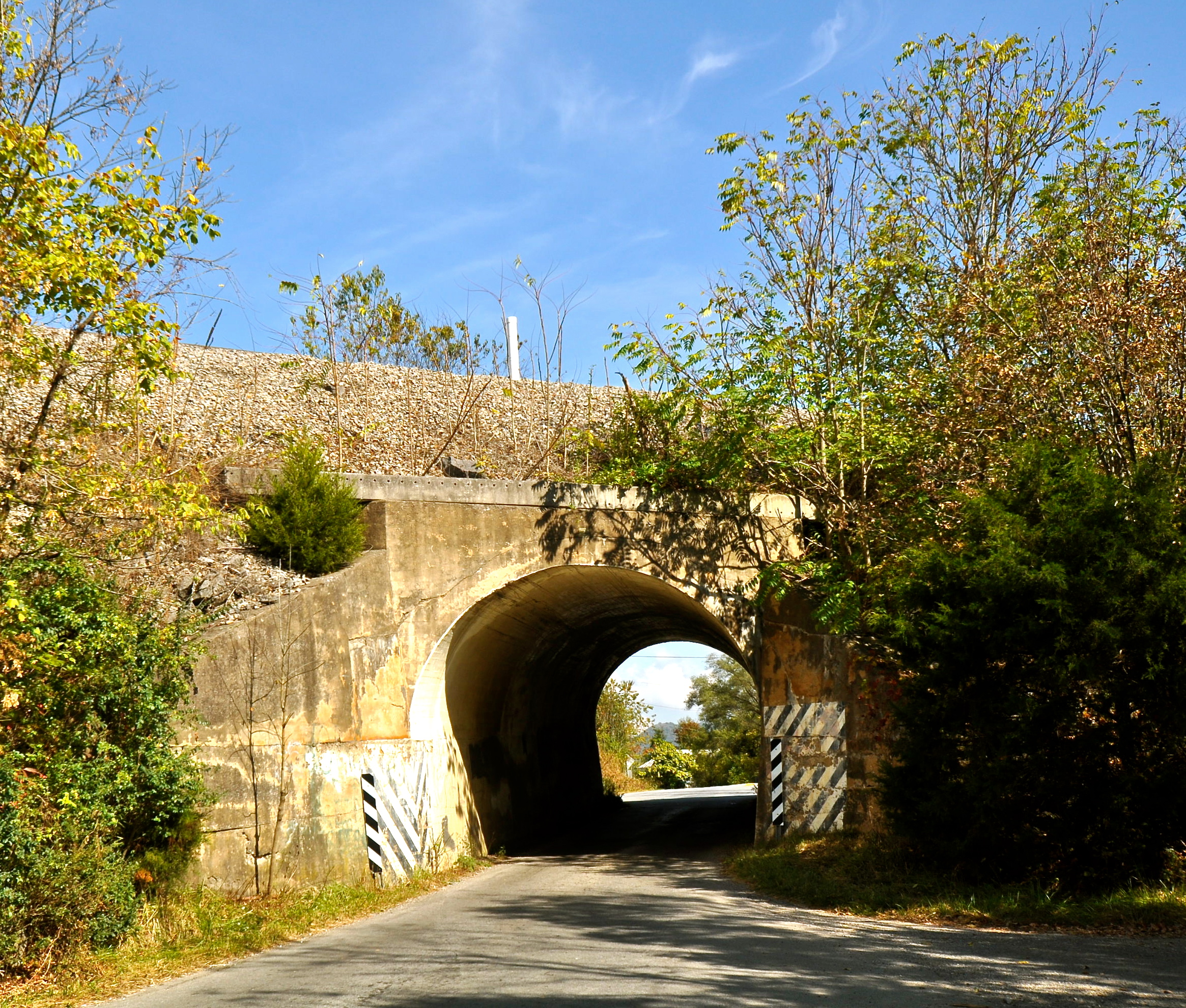
- Virginian Railway Underpass, October 2013

- Location within Virginia Location within the United States
- Location: Jct. of Norfolk Southern Railroad tracks and VA 723, S of New Ellett, New Ellett, Virginia
- Coordinates: 37°11′58″N 80°21′51″W
- Area: less than one acre
- Built: 1906
- Built by: Bates & Rogers Construction Co.
- Architectural style: Horseshoe-arch underpass
- MPS: Montgomery County MPS
- NRHP reference No.: 89001903
- VLR No.: 060-0573

Significant dates
- Added to NRHP: November 13, 1989
- Designated VLR: June 20, 1989

Virginian Railway Underpass is a historic concrete arch bridge located at New Ellett, Montgomery County, Virginia. It was built in 1906, and is a single circular barrel underpass constructed of cast-in-place concrete. The underpass at ground level is 14 feet 6 inches (4.42 m) in width with a total head room of 12 feet 9 inches (3.89 m).

The bridge was listed on the National Register of Historic Places in 1989.

== See also ==
- List of bridges on the National Register of Historic Places in Virginia
