= Alleghany Springs, Virginia =

Unincorporated community in Virginia, United States

- Unincorporated community
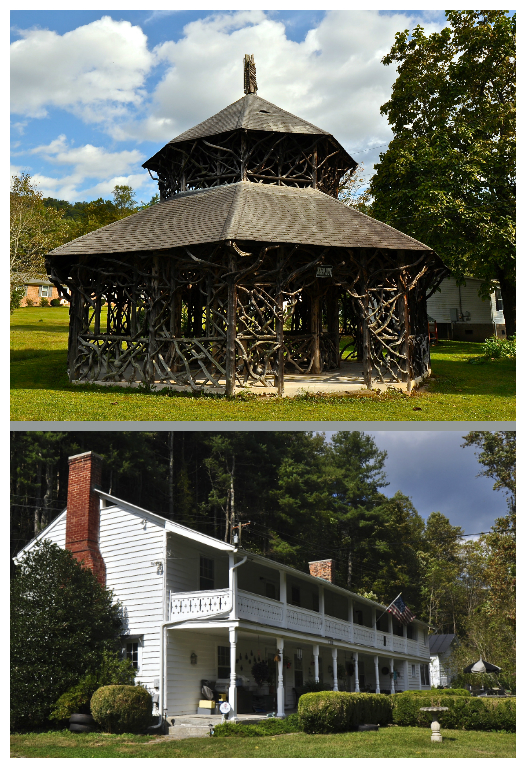
- National Register of Historic Places in Alleghany Springs, Virginia. Top: Alleghany Springs Springhouse; Bottom: William Barnett House

- Location within Shenandoah Valley Location within Virginia Location within the United States
- Coordinates: 37°07′41″N 80°15′54″W
- Country: United States
- State: Virginia
- County: Montgomery
- Elevation: 1,398 ft (426 m)
- Time zone: UTC-5 (Eastern (EST))
  - Summer (DST): UTC-4 (EDT)
- Area code: 540
- GNIS feature ID: 1462400

Alleghany Springs is an unincorporated community in Montgomery County, Virginia, United States. Alleghany Springs is located along State Route 637, 7.9 miles (12.7 km) east of Christiansburg.

Alleghany Springs contained a post office from 1854 until the 1940s. The Alleghany Springs Springhouse and William Barnett House are listed on the National Register of Historic Places.
