= James Charlton Farm =

Historic house in Virginia, United States

- U.S. National Register of Historic Places
- Virginia Landmarks Register
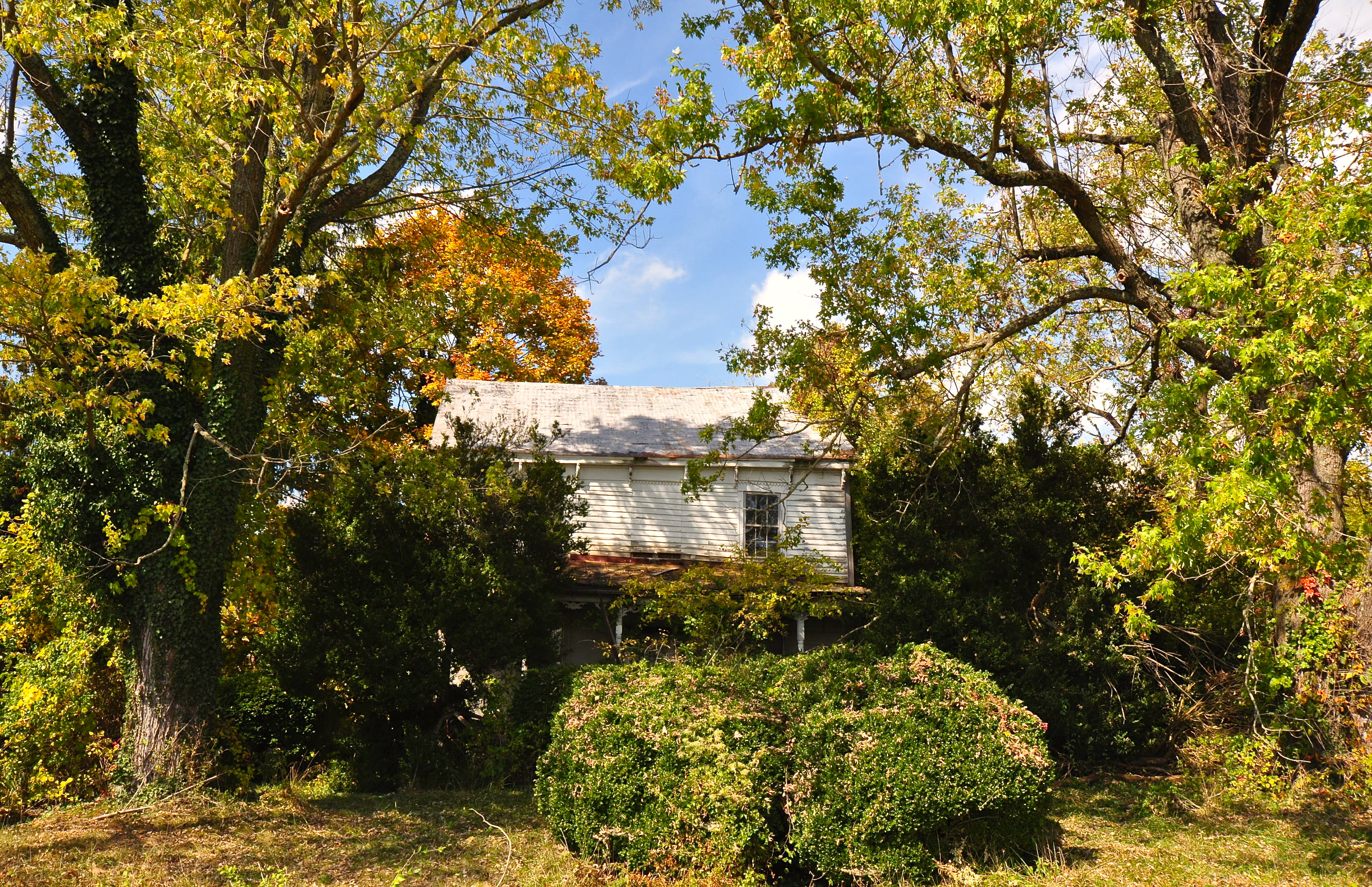
- James Charlton Farm, October 2013

- Location within Virginia Location within the United States
- Location: VA 666, 1.3 mi. SW of VA 724, Radford, Virginia
- Coordinates: 37°5′54″N 80°29′54″W
- Area: 1.8 acres (0.73 ha)
- Architectural style: Four-room plan
- MPS: Montgomery County MPS
- NRHP reference No.: 89001816
- VLR No.: 060-0137

Significant dates
- Added to NRHP: November 13, 1989
- Designated VLR: June 20, 1989

James Charlton Farm is a historic home located near Radford, Montgomery County, Virginia. The house dates to the early-19th century, and is a two-story, square, log dwelling with a four-room plan. It is sheathed in weatherboard, and features a pair of coursed rubble double-shouldered chimneys linked by a stone wall approximately five feet high. Also on the property are the contributing coursed rubble stone chimney, a board-and-batten meathouse, a frame drive-through corn crib, a frame barn, and two frame garages.

It was listed on the National Register of Historic Places in 1989.
