= Basham, Virginia =

Unincorporated community in Virginia, United States

- Unincorporated community
- Location within Virginia Location within the United States
- Coordinates: 37°02′10″N 80°20′33″W
- Country: United States
- State: Virginia
- County: Montgomery
- Elevation: 2,425 ft (739 m)
- Time zone: UTC-5 (Eastern (EST))
  - Summer (DST): UTC-4 (EDT)
- Area code: 540
- GNIS feature ID: 1477097

Basham is an unincorporated community in Montgomery County, Virginia, United States. Basham is located at the junction of State Routes 615 and 726, 7.4 miles (11.9 km) south-southeast of Christiansburg.

A post office was established at Basham in 1882, and remained in operation until it was discontinued in 1955. The Frank Lawrence House was listed on the National Register of Historic Places in 1989.
