= Montgomery White Sulphur Springs Cottage =

Historic house in Virginia, United States

- Formerly listed on the U.S. National Register of Historic Places
- Virginia Landmarks Register
- Location: Depot and New Sts., Christiansburg, Virginia
- Area: less than one acre
- Built: 1904
- Architectural style: Italian Villa
- MPS: Montgomery County MPS
- NRHP reference No.: 89001884
- VLR No.: 154-0008

Significant dates
- Added to NRHP: 1989
- Designated VLR
- Removed from NRHP: March 19, 2001

Montgomery White Sulphur Springs Cottage, also known as Haley House, was a historic home located at Christiansburg, Virginia. It was a one-story, four-bay, frame dwelling with a standing seam metal hipped roof and central chimney. It was one of three surviving structures from the Montgomery White Sulphur Springs resort. When the resort closed in 1904, the cottage was moved to Christiansburg. It was demolished in 1995–1996.

It was listed on the National Register of Historic Places in 1989, and delisted in 2001.
