= South Franklin Street Historic District =

Historic district in Virginia, United States

- U.S. National Register of Historic Places
- U.S. Historic district
- Virginia Landmarks Register
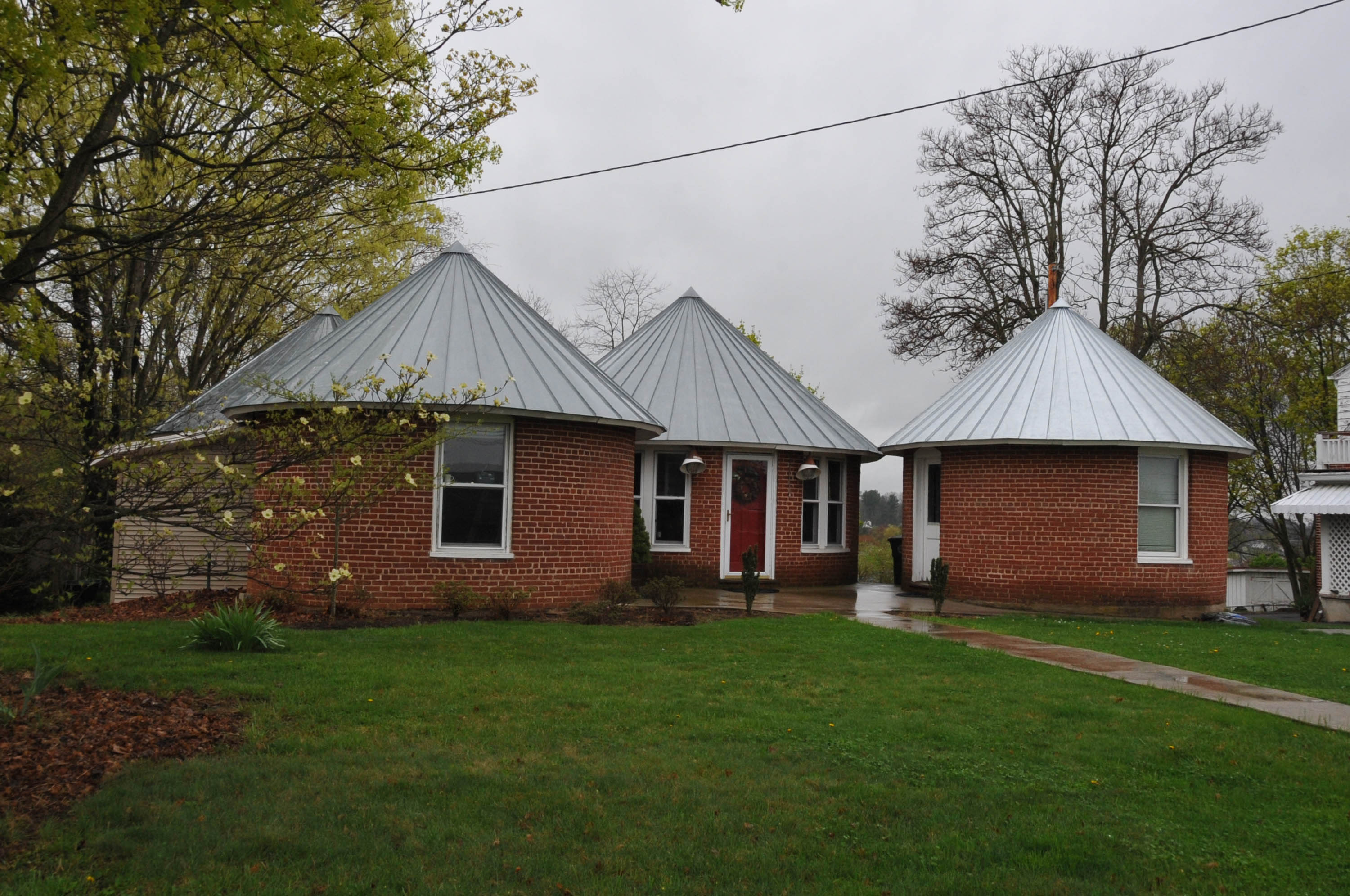
- The Rice House

- Location within Virginia Location within the United States
- Location: 100-308 S. Franklin St., Christiansburg, Virginia
- Coordinates: 37°7′39″N 80°24′23″W
- Area: 11 acres (4.5 ha)
- Architectural style: Colonial Revival, Bungalow/craftsman, Greek Revival
- MPS: Montgomery County MPS
- NRHP reference No.: 90002007
- VLR No.: 154-0010

Significant dates
- Added to NRHP: January 10, 1991
- Designated VLR: June 20, 1989

South Franklin Street Historic District is a national historic district located at Christiansburg, Montgomery County, Virginia. The district encompasses 26 contributing buildings in the town of Christiansburg. It includes principally single family brick and frame dwellings dated to the late-19th and early-20th centuries. They are reflective of a variety of popular architectural styles, in including Colonial Revival, Bungalow / American Craftsman, and Greek Revival. A notable dwelling is the 1919 Rice House, known as "The Huts." It consists of one large (20 feet in diameter) circular conically-roofed section and three smaller (15 feet in diameter) circular units clustered to the north, east, and southeast.

It was listed on the National Register of Historic Places in 1991.
