= William Barnett House =

Historic house in Virginia, United States

- U.S. National Register of Historic Places
- Virginia Landmarks Register
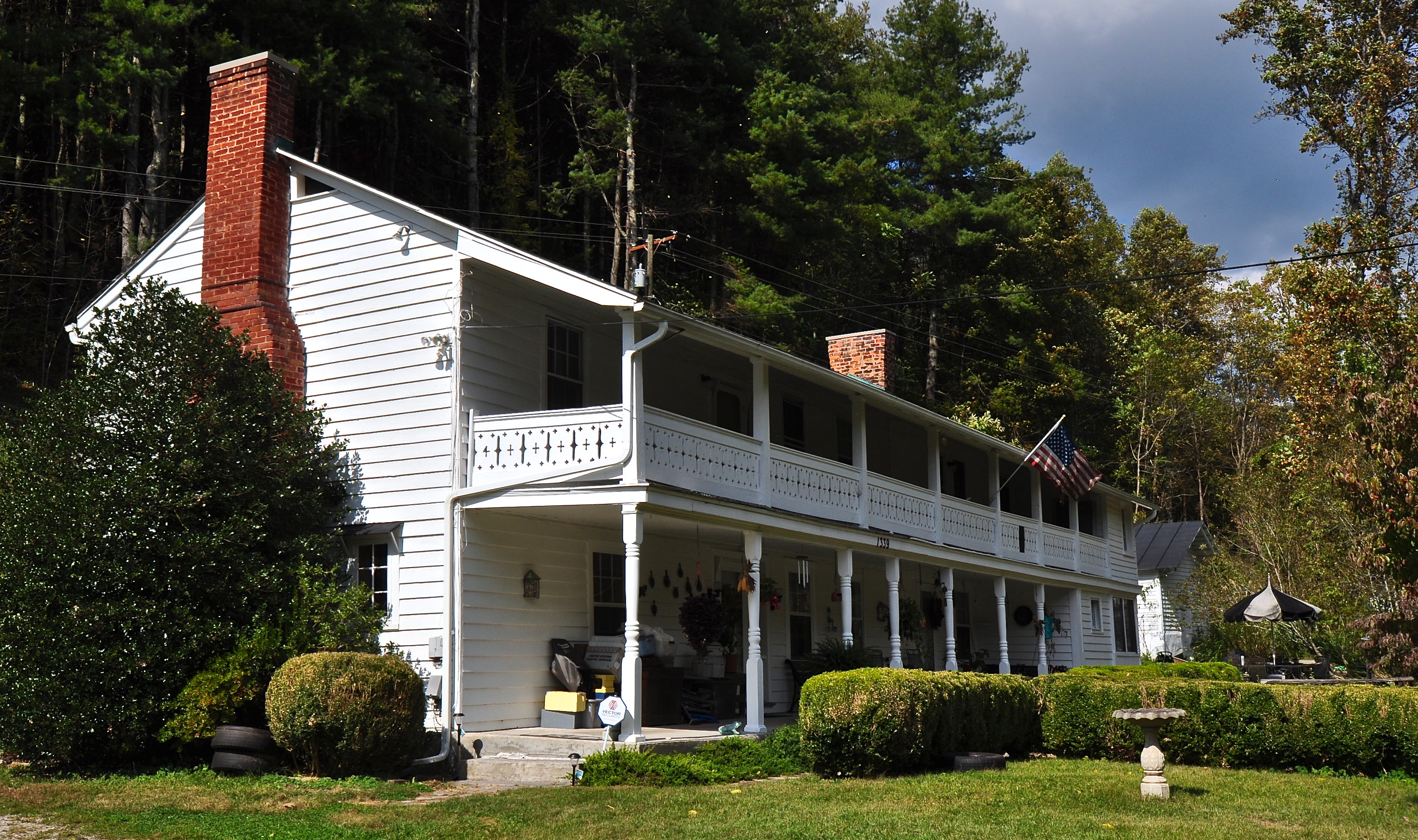
- William Barnett House, October 2013

- Location within Virginia Location within the United States
- Location: Off VA 637, 0.1 miles (0.16 km) north of VA 638, Alleghany Springs, Virginia
- Coordinates: 37°8′35″N 80°16′1″W
- Area: 2.5 acres (1.0 ha)
- Built: c. 1813
- Architectural style: Rectangular single-pen plan
- MPS: Montgomery County MPS
- NRHP reference No.: 89001806
- VLR No.: 060-0472

Significant dates
- Added to NRHP: November 13, 1989
- Designated VLR: June 20, 1989

William Barnett House is a historic home located at Alleghany Springs, Montgomery County, Virginia. It is a long two-story, log and frame structure consisting of a number of elements of different dates. The earliest section may date to 1813, and is the central log section with a two-story frame or log addition and adjacent room and a frame two-room section added in the mid-19th century. It has a rear wing and is topped by a standing seam metal gable roof. It features a two-story ornamental porch that spans the entire front of the building with chamfered posts and sawn balusters. Also on the property are a contributing two-story, single-pen log kitchen; a small stone shed-roofed greenhouse; and a corn crib.

It was listed on the National Register of Historic Places in 1989.
