= George Earhart House =

Historic house in Virginia, United States

- U.S. National Register of Historic Places
- Virginia Landmarks Register
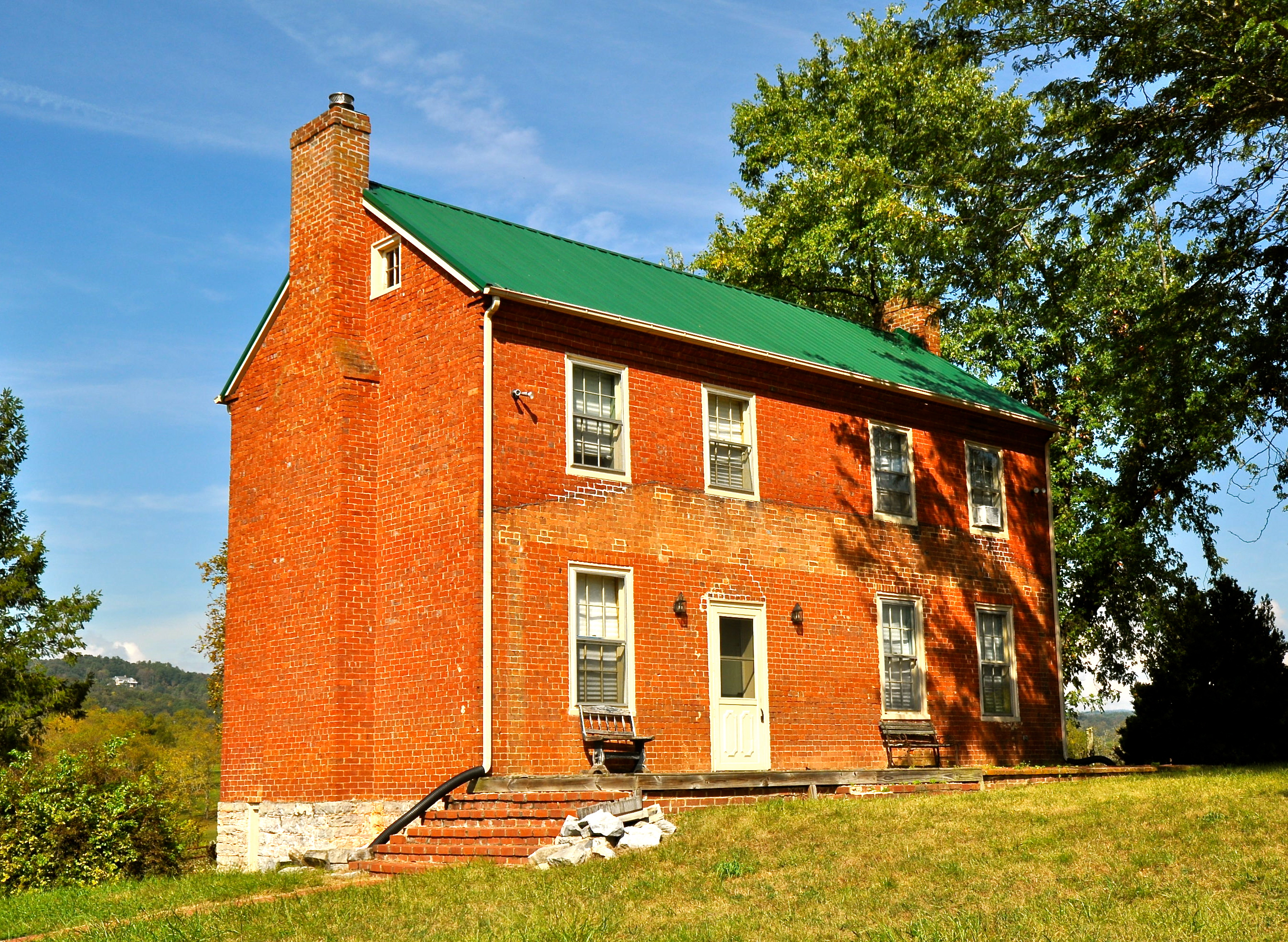
- George Earhart House, October 2013

- Location within Virginia Location within the United States
- Location: VA 712, 0.5 mi. N of VA 723, New Ellett, Virginia
- Coordinates: 37°12′25″N 80°21′44″W
- Area: 1 acre (0.40 ha)
- Built: c. 1840
- Architectural style: Two-room plan
- MPS: Montgomery County MPS
- NRHP reference No.: 89001886
- VLR No.: 060-0300

Significant dates
- Added to NRHP: November 13, 1989
- Designated VLR: June 20, 1989

George Earhart House, also known as the Arrington House and Miller House, is a historic home located at New Ellett, Montgomery County, Virginia. It was built about 1840, and is a two-story, brick structure with a one-story rear ell. It has shouldered brick chimneys at three locations. It has a two-room plan.

It was listed on the National Register of Historic Places in 1989.
