= Phillips–Ronald House =

Historic house in Virginia, United States

- U.S. National Register of Historic Places
- Virginia Landmarks Register
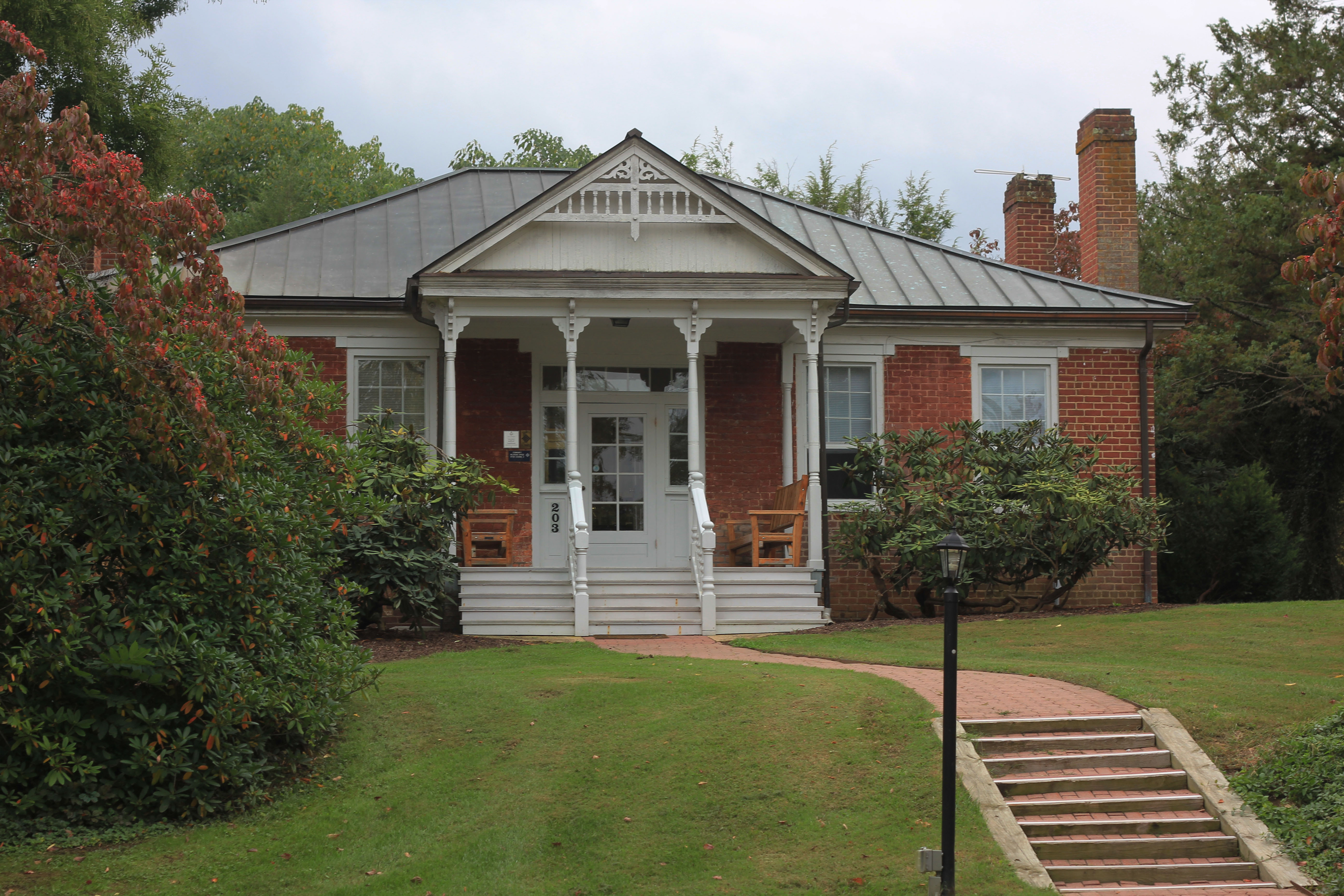
- Phillips–Ronald House, September 2012

- Location within Virginia Location within the United States
- Location: Draper Rd. at Washington St., Blacksburg, Virginia
- Coordinates: 37°13′37″N 80°24′49″W
- Area: less than one acre
- Built: 1851
- Architectural style: Double-pile center-passage
- MPS: Montgomery County MPS
- NRHP reference No.: 89001904
- VLR No.: 150-0015

Significant dates
- Added to NRHP: November 13, 1989
- Designated VLR: June 20, 1989

The Phillips–Ronald House, also known as the Carrington Lybrook House and Five Chimneys, is a historic home located at Blacksburg, Montgomery County, Virginia. It was built in 1851–1852, and is a one-story, brick dwelling with a hipped roof and double-pile, central-passage plan. It features a late-19th century, three-bay central entrance porch with sawn brackets and spindles in the gable and slender turned posts. Also on the property is a contributing frame garage.

It was listed on the National Register of Historic Places in 1989.
