= Surface House =

Historic house in Virginia, United States

- U.S. National Register of Historic Places
- Virginia Landmarks Register
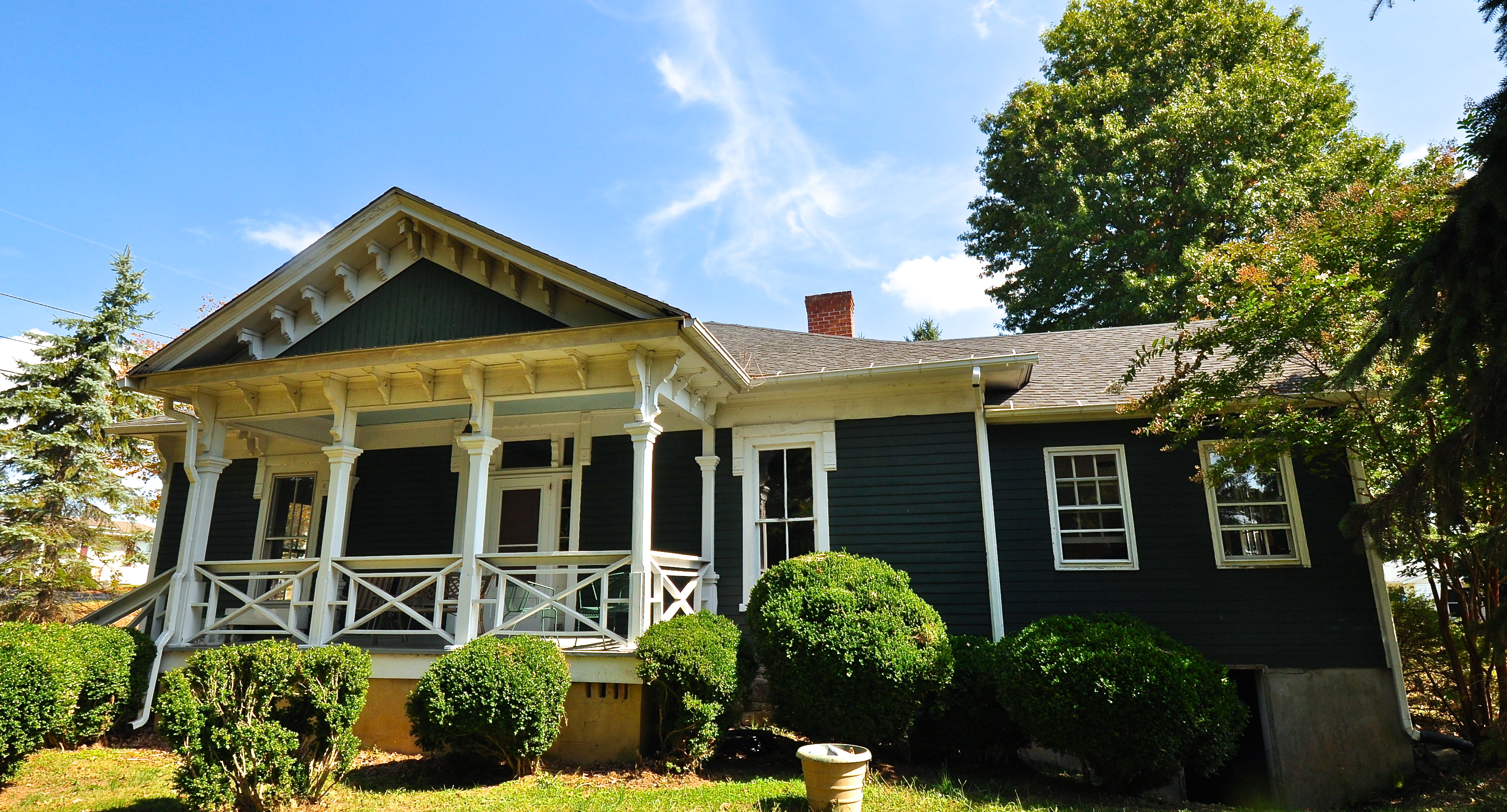
- Surface House, October 2013

- Location within Virginia Location within the United States
- Location: High St., E of Depot St., Christiansburg, Virginia
- Coordinates: 37°8′20″N 80°24′30″W
- Area: less than one acre
- Built: c. 1870
- Architectural style: Double-pile center passage
- MPS: Montgomery County MPS
- NRHP reference No.: 89001883
- VLR No.: 154-0043

Significant dates
- Added to NRHP: November 13, 1989
- Designated VLR: June 20, 1989

Surface House is a historic home located at Christiansburg, Montgomery County, Virginia, United States. It was built about 1870, and is a one-story, double-pile center passage form frame dwelling on a stone foundation. It has a hipped roof surrounded by pairs of ornamental brackets in the eaves that also decorate the pedimented four-bay porch.

It was listed on the National Register of Historic Places in 1989.
