= New Ellett, Virginia =

Unincorporated community in Virginia, United States

- Unincorporated community
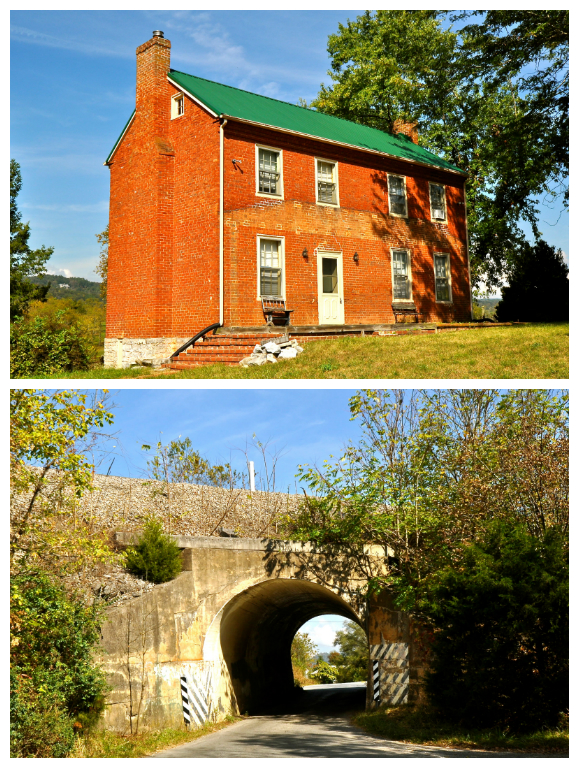
- National Register of Historic Places at New Ellett, Virginia Top: George Earhart House Bottom: Virginian Railway Underpass

- Location within Virginia Location within the United States
- Coordinates: 37°11′58″N 80°21′48″W
- Country: United States
- State: Virginia
- County: Montgomery
- Elevation: 1,549 ft (472 m)
- Time zone: UTC-5 (Eastern (EST))
  - Summer (DST): UTC-4 (EDT)
- Area code: 540
- GNIS feature ID: 1495999

New Ellett is an unincorporated community in Montgomery County, Virginia, United States. New Ellett is located on State Route 723, 3.5 miles (5.6 km) southeast of Blacksburg.

The George Earhart House and Virginian Railway Underpass are listed on the National Register of Historic Places.
