= The Oaks (Christiansburg, Virginia) =

Historic house in Virginia, United States

- U.S. National Register of Historic Places
- Virginia Landmarks Register
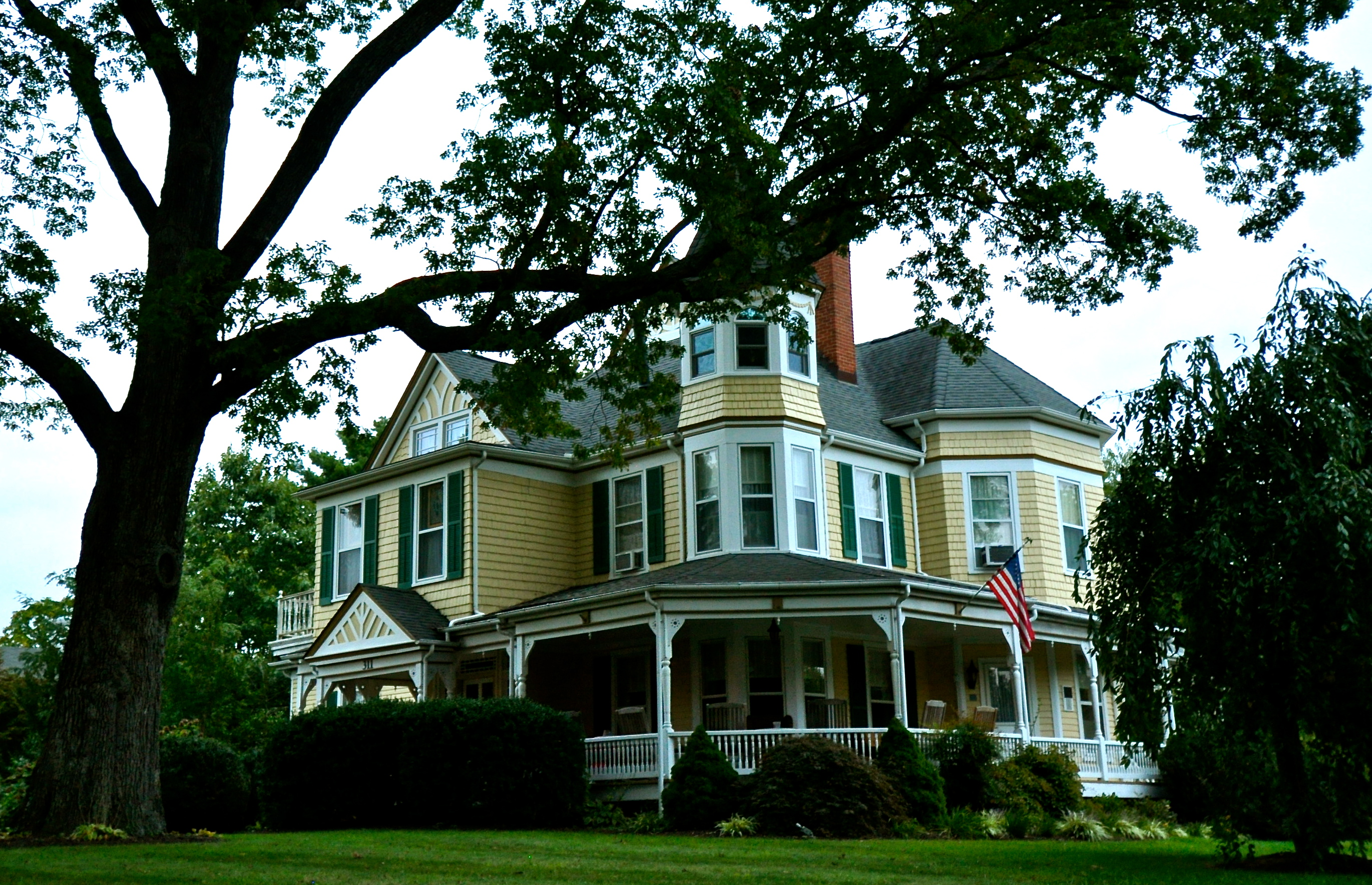
- The Oaks, September 2013

- Location within Virginia Location within the United States
- Location: 311 E. Main St., Christiansburg, Virginia
- Coordinates: 37°7′58″N 80°24′18″W
- Area: 1.2 acres (0.49 ha)
- Built: 1893
- Architectural style: Queen Anne
- NRHP reference No.: 94000709
- VLR No.: 154-0001-0005

Significant dates
- Added to NRHP: July 15, 1994
- Designated VLR: April 20, 1994

The Oaks is a historic home located at Christiansburg, Montgomery County, Virginia. It was built in 1893, and is a two-story, asymmetrical Queen Anne style frame house. It features a wraparound porch, a polygonal tower, a polygonal turret, and a hipped roof with two cross gables and four brick chimneys. It is operated as a bed and breakfast.

It was listed on the National Register of Historic Places in 1994.
