= Brush Harbor, Virginia =

Unincorporated community in Virginia, United States

- Unincorporated community
- Location within Virginia Location within the United States
- Coordinates: 37°11′03″N 80°17′27″W
- Country: United States
- State: Virginia
- County: Montgomery
- Elevation: 1,699 ft (518 m)
- Time zone: UTC-5 (Eastern (EST))
  - Summer (DST): UTC-4 (EDT)
- Area code: 540
- GNIS feature ID: 1495316

Brush Harbor is an unincorporated community in Montgomery County, Virginia, United States. Brush Harbor is located along State Route 636, 7.5 miles (12.1 km) east-northeast of Christiansburg.

The Nealy Gordon Farm was listed on the National Register of Historic Places in 1989.
