= Currie House =

Historic house in Virginia, United States

- U.S. National Register of Historic Places
- Virginia Landmarks Register
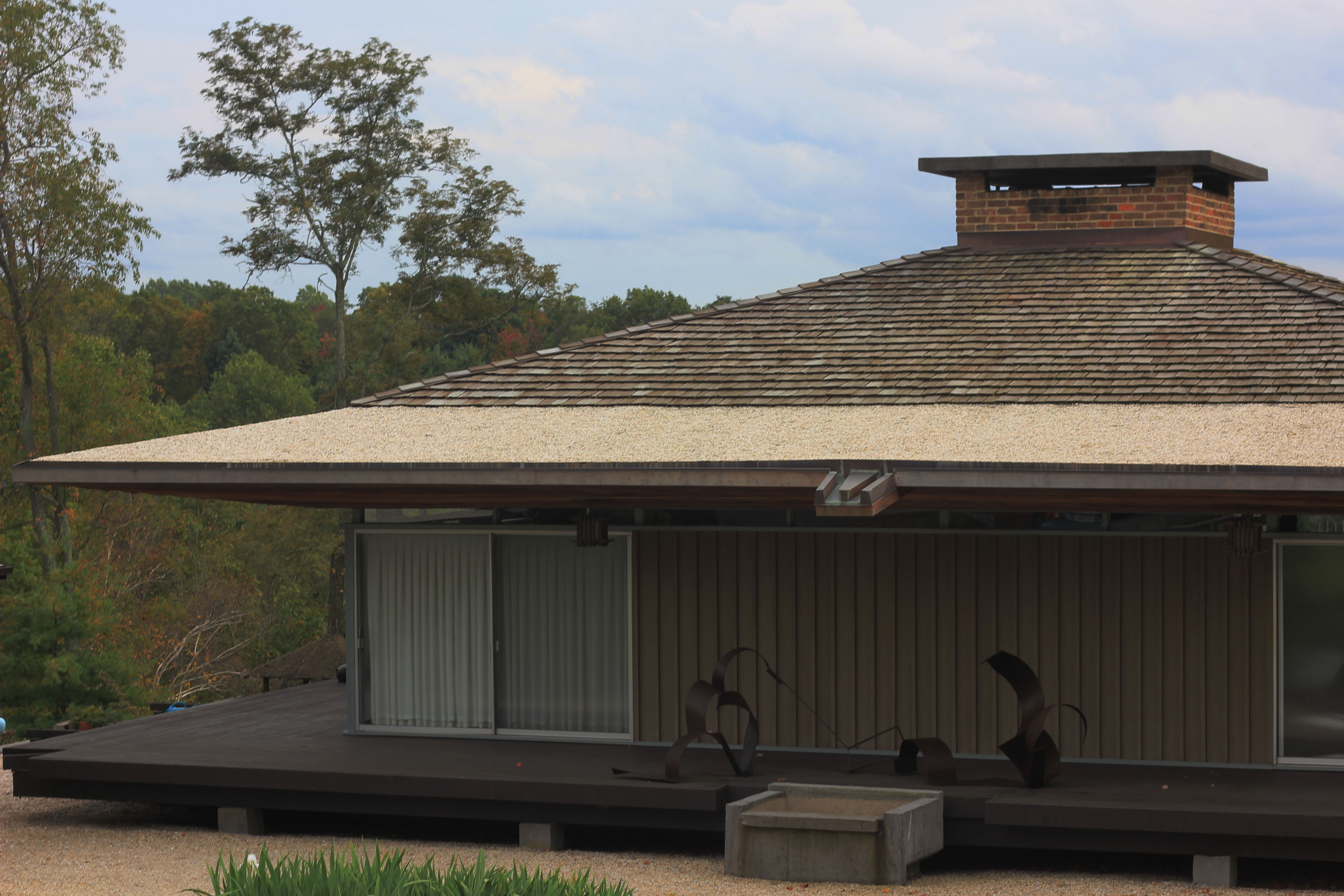
- Currie House, September 2012

- Location within Virginia Location within the United States
- Location: 1105 Highland Cir., Blacksburg, Virginia
- Coordinates: 37°13′25″N 80°23′39″W
- Area: less than one acre
- Built: 1961
- Built by: Pascoe, Charles
- Architect: Currie, Leonard
- Architectural style: International Style
- NRHP reference No.: 94000549
- VLR No.: 150-0019

Significant dates
- Added to NRHP: September 14, 1994
- Designated VLR: April 20, 1994

Currie House, also known as the Pagoda House, is a historic home located at Blacksburg, Montgomery County, Virginia. It was built in 1961, and is a 1 1/2-story, square, International Style dwelling constructed of wood, glass, and brick. It features an extensive roof overhang that is underscored by a deck that encircles the building. The interior has an open-plan room arrangement surrounding a central brick chimney and service core. The architect, Leonard Currie (1913-1996), was a student and colleague of Walter Gropius and Marcel Breuer. Leonard Currie was head of the Architecture School at Virginia Tech from 1956 to 1966.

It was listed on the National Register of Historic Places in 1994.
