= Frank Lawrence House =

Historic house in Virginia, United States

- U.S. National Register of Historic Places
- Virginia Landmarks Register
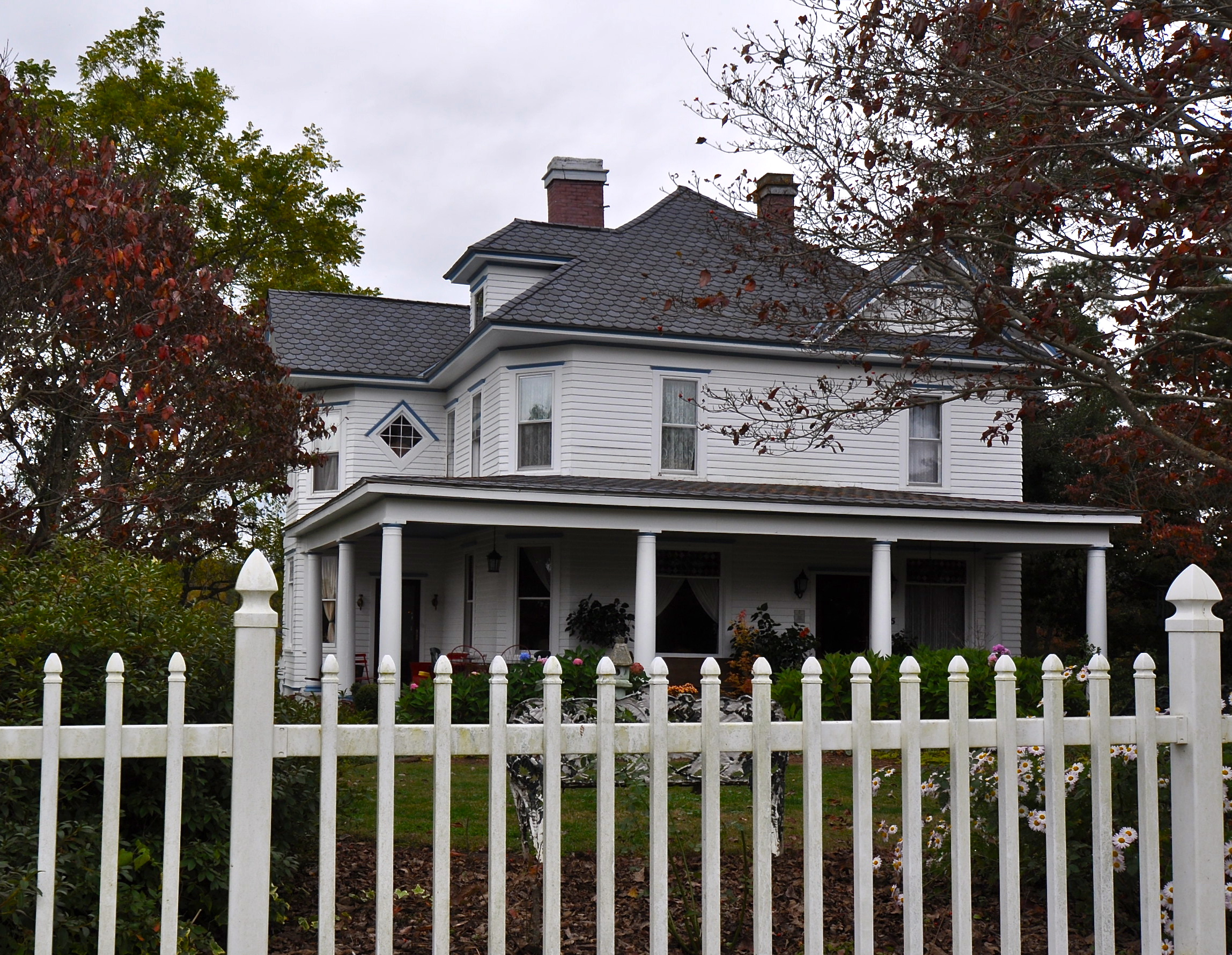
- Frank Lawrence House, October 2013

- Location within Virginia Location within the United States
- Location: VA 612, 0.5 miles (0.80 km) east of VA 614, Basham, Virginia
- Coordinates: 37°3′8″N 80°19′5″W
- Area: less than one acre
- Built: c. 1918
- MPS: Montgomery County MPS
- NRHP reference No.: 89001897
- VLR No.: 060-0003

Significant dates
- Added to NRHP: November 13, 1989
- Designated VLR: June 20, 1989

Frank Lawrence House is a historic home located at Basham, Montgomery County, Virginia. It was built in 1918, and is a two-story frame dwelling with a foursquare floor plan. The roof is covered with its original pressed metal shingles. It features a five-bay, wraparound porch with Doric order columns and square balusters. It also has a two-story, two level rear porch. Its design is based on a Sears and Roebuck Company catalog plan.

It was listed on the National Register of Historic Places in 1989.
