= Cambria Historic District =

Historic district in Virginia, United States

- U.S. National Register of Historic Places
- U.S. Historic district
- Virginia Landmarks Register
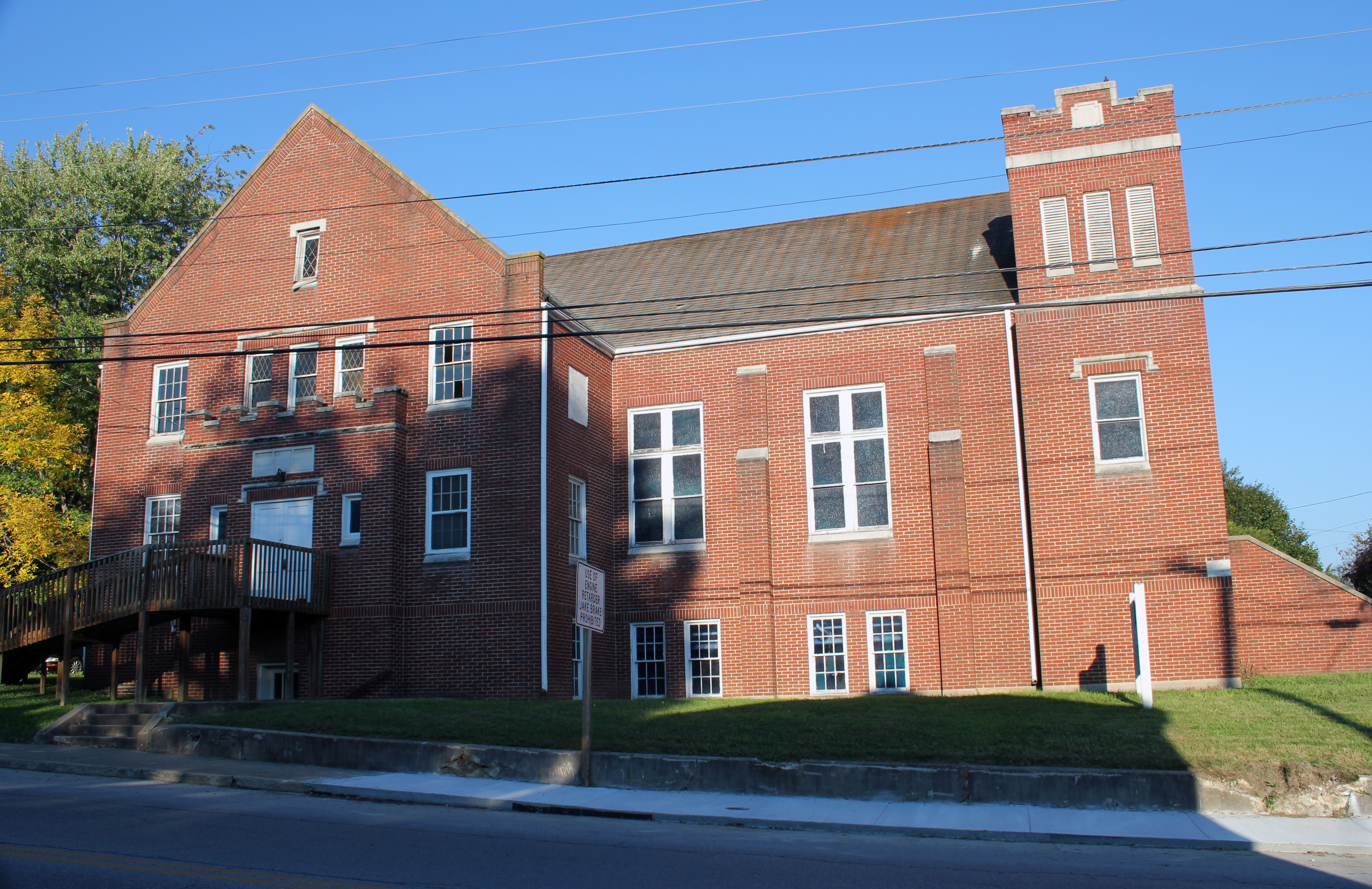
- Church on Montgomery Street

- Location within Virginia Location within the United States
- Location: 500-600 blocks Depot St., 500-600 block Montgomery St., 900-1000 blocks Cambria St., and railroad depots, Christiansburg, Virginia
- Coordinates: 37°7′57″N 80°24′22″W
- Area: 34 acres (14 ha)
- Built: 1854
- Architectural style: Colonial Revival, Queen Anne, Italianate
- MPS: Montgomery County MPS
- NRHP reference No.: 90002002
- VLR No.: 154-0048

Significant dates
- Added to NRHP: January 10, 1991
- Designated VLR: June 20, 1989

Cambria Historic District is a national historic district located at Christiansburg, Montgomery County, Virginia. The district encompasses 34 contributing buildings in the town of Christiansburg. It includes a variety of commercial, residential, and institutional buildings related to Cambria's historical role as the "port" for the nearby town of Christiansburg. The residences are reflective of a variety of popular architectural styles, in including Colonial Revival and Queen Anne. Notable buildings include the Surface-Lee Block, Dew Drop Inn, Epperly Pontiac dealership, Cambria Hardware Company Building, Palmer Store, Lee House, Cambria Baptist Church (1928), and the New Christiansburg Depot (1906). The Cambria Freight Station is located in the district and listed separately.

It was listed on the National Register of Historic Places in 1991.
