= Alleghany Springs Springhouse =

- U.S. National Register of Historic Places
- Virginia Landmarks Register
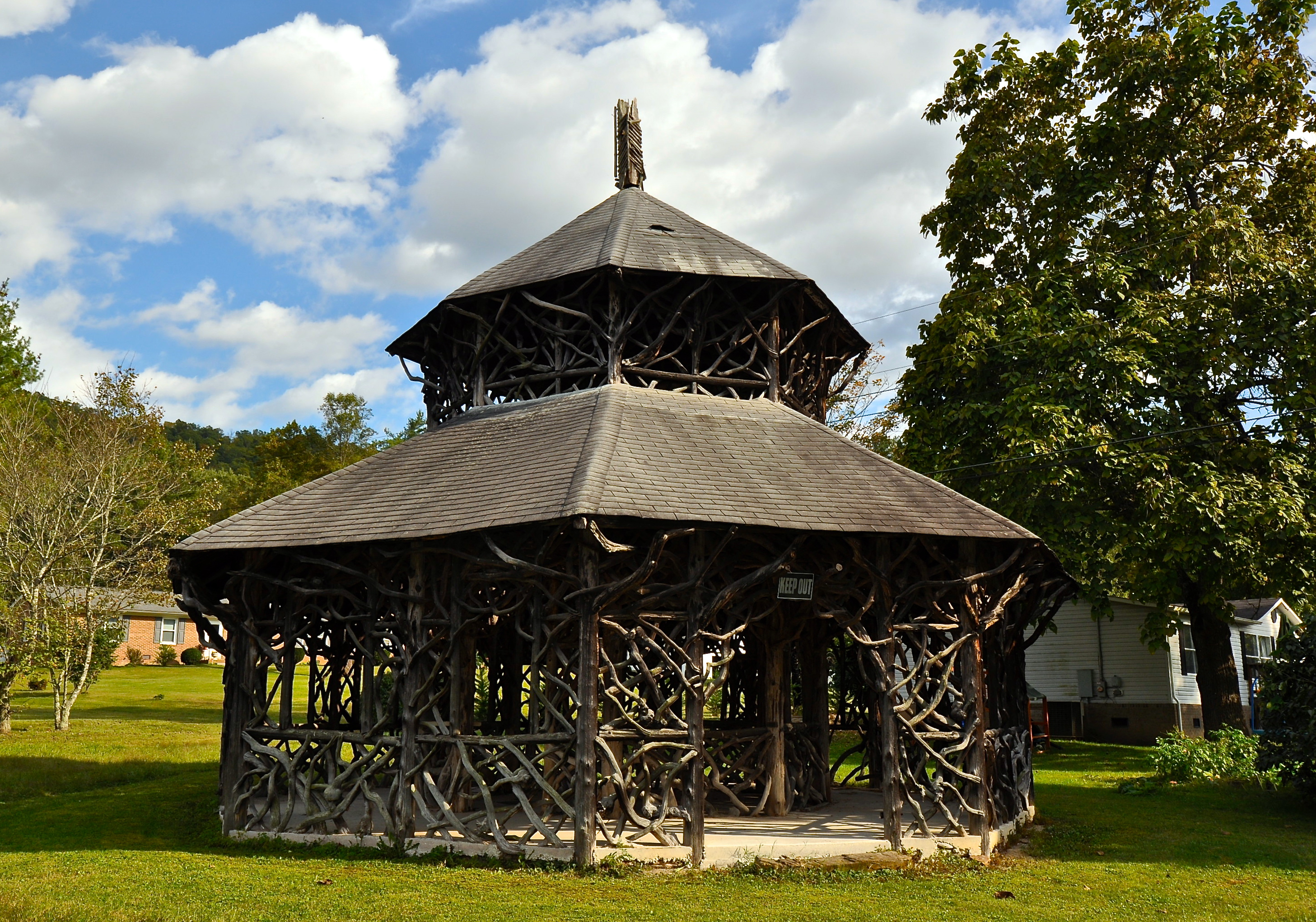
- Alleghany Springs Springhouse, September 2013

- Location within Virginia Location within the United States
- Location: VA 637, Alleghany Springs, Virginia
- Coordinates: 37°7′43″N 80°15′49″W
- Area: less than one acre
- Built: c. 1890
- Architectural style: Rustic
- MPS: Montgomery County MPS
- NRHP reference No.: 89001807
- VLR No.: 060-0476

Significant dates
- Added to NRHP: November 13, 1989
- Designated VLR: June 20, 1989

Alleghany Springs Springhouse is a historic spring house located on the former grounds of Alleghany Springs, at Alleghany Springs, Montgomery County, Virginia. It was built about 1890, and is a two-tier, rustic, hip-roofed, octagonal pavilion. The structure is supported on rough cedar posts with complex intertwined knots of rhododendron branches and roots forming brackets, railings, and even vaulted "ceilings." At the center of the structure is the Alleghany Spring, that has been blocked.

It was listed on the National Register of Historic Places in 1989.
