= Crockett Springs Cottage =

Historic house in Virginia, United States

- U.S. National Register of Historic Places
- Virginia Landmarks Register
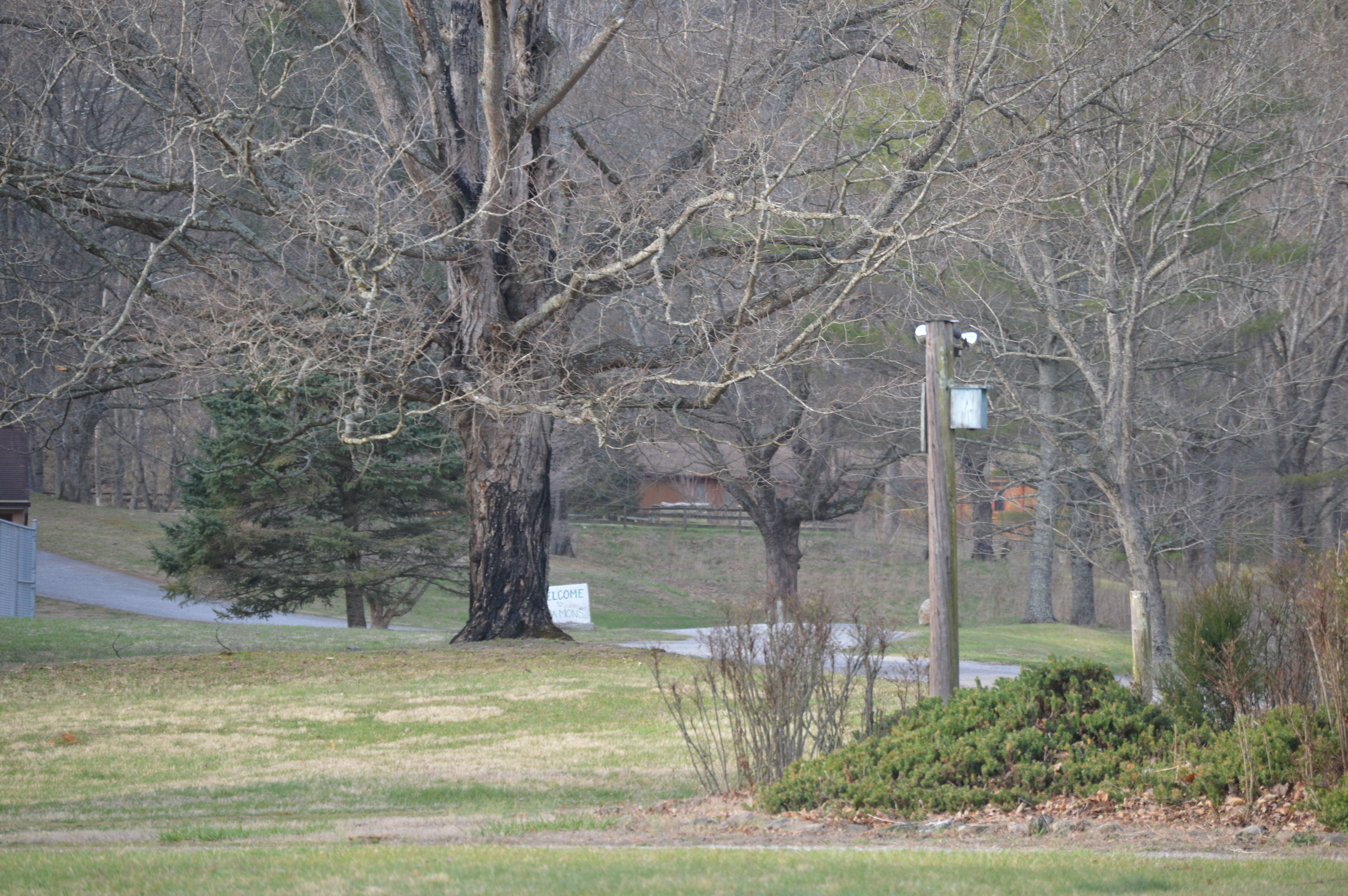
- Distant view from the north

- Location within Virginia Location within the United States
- Location: 1 mile (1.6 km) south of the junction of VA 637 and 609, Piedmont, Virginia
- Coordinates: 37°5′37″N 80°15′13″W
- Area: Less than 1 acre (0.40 ha)
- Built: 1889
- Architectural style: Double-cell cottage
- MPS: Montgomery County MPS
- NRHP reference No.: 89001814
- VLR No.: 060-0487

Significant dates
- Added to NRHP: November 13, 1989
- Designated VLR: June 20, 1989

Crockett Springs Cottage, also known as Camp Alta Mons Cottage, is a historic home located at Piedmont, Montgomery County, Virginia. It was built about 1889, and is a one-story, four-bay, two-room, frame cottage on brick piers. It features a porch with flat decorative wood posts and a square baluster railing. It is one of the few surviving structures from the large number of resorts within the county. The Crockett Springs Hotel resort went out of business in 1939.

It was listed on the National Register of Historic Places in 1989.
