= Piedmont, Montgomery County, Virginia =

Unincorporated community in Virginia, United States

Piedmont, Virginia
- Unincorporated community
- Location within Virginia Location within the United States
- Coordinates: 37°06′00″N 80°13′08″W
- Country: United States
- State: Virginia
- County: Montgomery
- Elevation: 1,535 ft (468 m)
- Time zone: UTC-5 (Eastern (EST))
  - Summer (DST): UTC-4 (EDT)
- Area code: 540
- GNIS feature ID: 1472274

Piedmont is an unincorporated community in Montgomery County, Virginia, United States. Piedmont is located on State Route 653, 10.7 miles (17.2 km) east-southeast of Christiansburg.

The name Piedmont comes from medieval Latin Pedemontium or Pedemontis, i.e., ad pedem montium, meaning "at the foot of the mountains".

The Crockett Springs Cottage and Piedmont Camp Meeting Grounds Historic District are listed on the National Register of Historic Places.
