= Miller–Southside Residential Historic District =

Historic district in Virginia, United States

- U.S. National Register of Historic Places
- U.S. Historic district
- Virginia Landmarks Register
- Location within Virginia Location within the United States
- Location: Roughly bounded by Miller St., S. Main St., Airport Rd. and Preston Ave., Blacksburg, Virginia
- Coordinates: 37°13′18″N 80°24′26″W
- Area: 60 acres (24 ha)
- Architect: Cowgill, Clinton Harriman; Gray, Wes
- Architectural style: Late 19th And Early 20th Century American Movements, Late 19th And 20th Century Revivals
- MPS: Montgomery County MPS
- NRHP reference No.: 90002110
- VLR No.: 150-0109

Significant dates
- Added to NRHP: January 11, 1991
- Designated VLR: June 20, 1989

Miller–Southside Residential Historic District is a national historic district located at Blacksburg, Montgomery County, Virginia. The district encompasses 165 contributing buildings in a predominantly residential section of the town of Blacksburg. The residences date between 1909 and 1941, and are in a variety of popular architectural styles including American Foursquare, Bungalow, and Colonial Revival.

It was listed on the National Register of Historic Places in 1991.
