= Piedmont Camp Meeting Grounds Historic District =

- U.S. National Register of Historic Places
- U.S. Historic district
- Virginia Landmarks Register
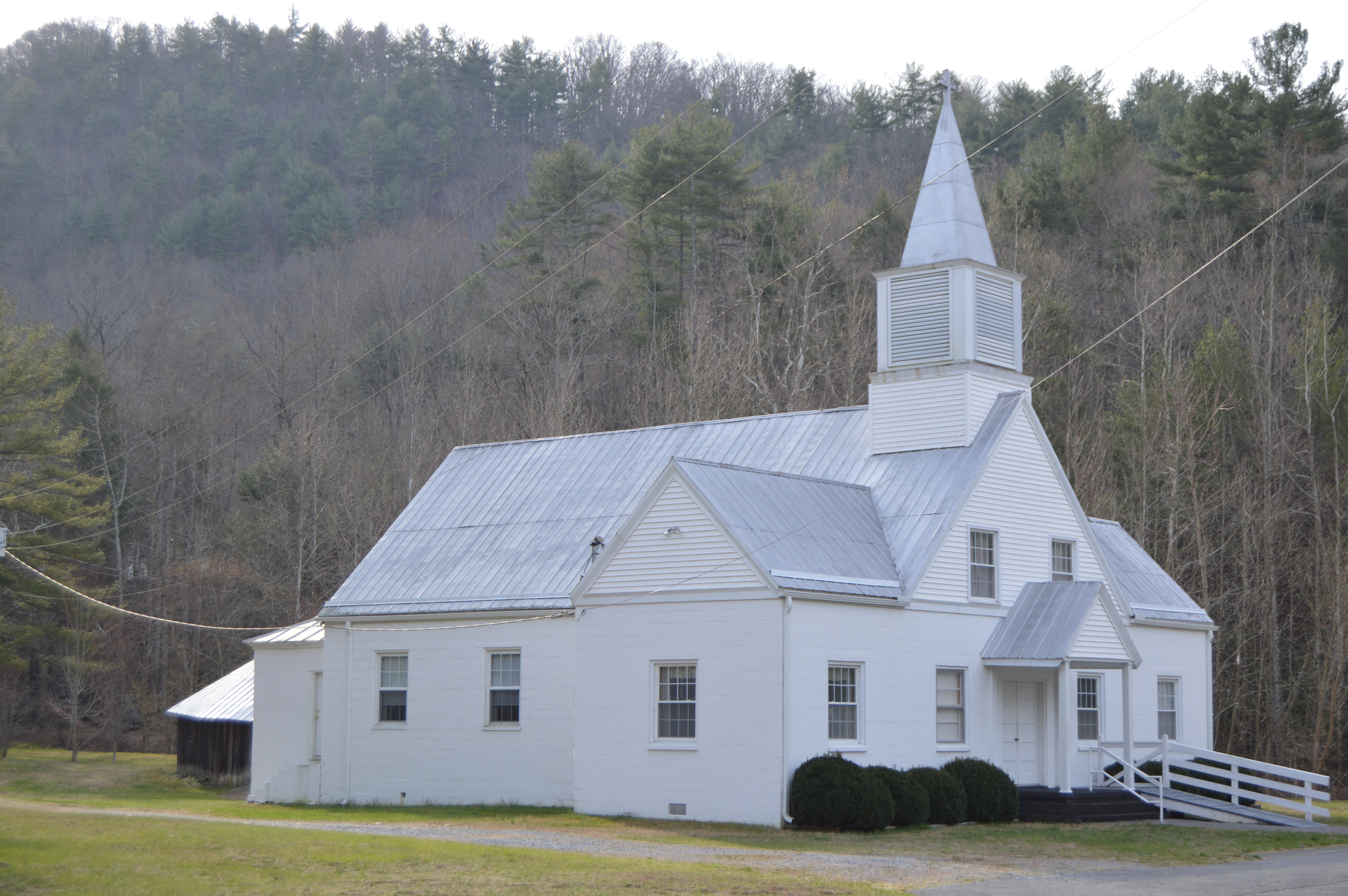
- Pentecostal church

- Location within Virginia Location within the United States
- Location: Jct. of VA 637 and VA 602, Piedmont, Virginia
- Coordinates: 37°6′14″N 80°13′3″W
- Area: 5 acres (2.0 ha)
- Built: c. 1873, 1910, 1936, 1939
- Architectural style: Double-cell plan
- MPS: Montgomery County MPS
- NRHP reference No.: 90002003
- VLR No.: 060-0500

Significant dates
- Added to NRHP: January 10, 1991
- Designated VLR: June 20, 1989

Piedmont Camp Meeting Grounds Historic District is a national historic district located at Piedmont, Montgomery County, Virginia. The district encompasses 22 contributing buildings associated with a camp meeting, a seasonal religious campground. The district includes a large, rustic tabernacle (1939), a group of small frame cabins, a dining hall in a former church building (c. 1910), the concrete block Piedmont Pentecostal Holiness Church (1936, 1957), and the nave-plan Piedmont Methodist Church (c. 1873), the district's oldest building. The tabernacle is the principal structure in the campground, and is an aisled gable roofed frame structure open on three sides and supported by untrimmed logs. The Piedmont Methodist Church is the church from which the Piedmont Pentecostal Holiness group broke away.

It was listed on the National Register of Historic Places in 1991.
