= Cambria Freight Station =

- U.S. National Register of Historic Places
- U.S. Historic district – Contributing property
- Virginia Landmarks Register
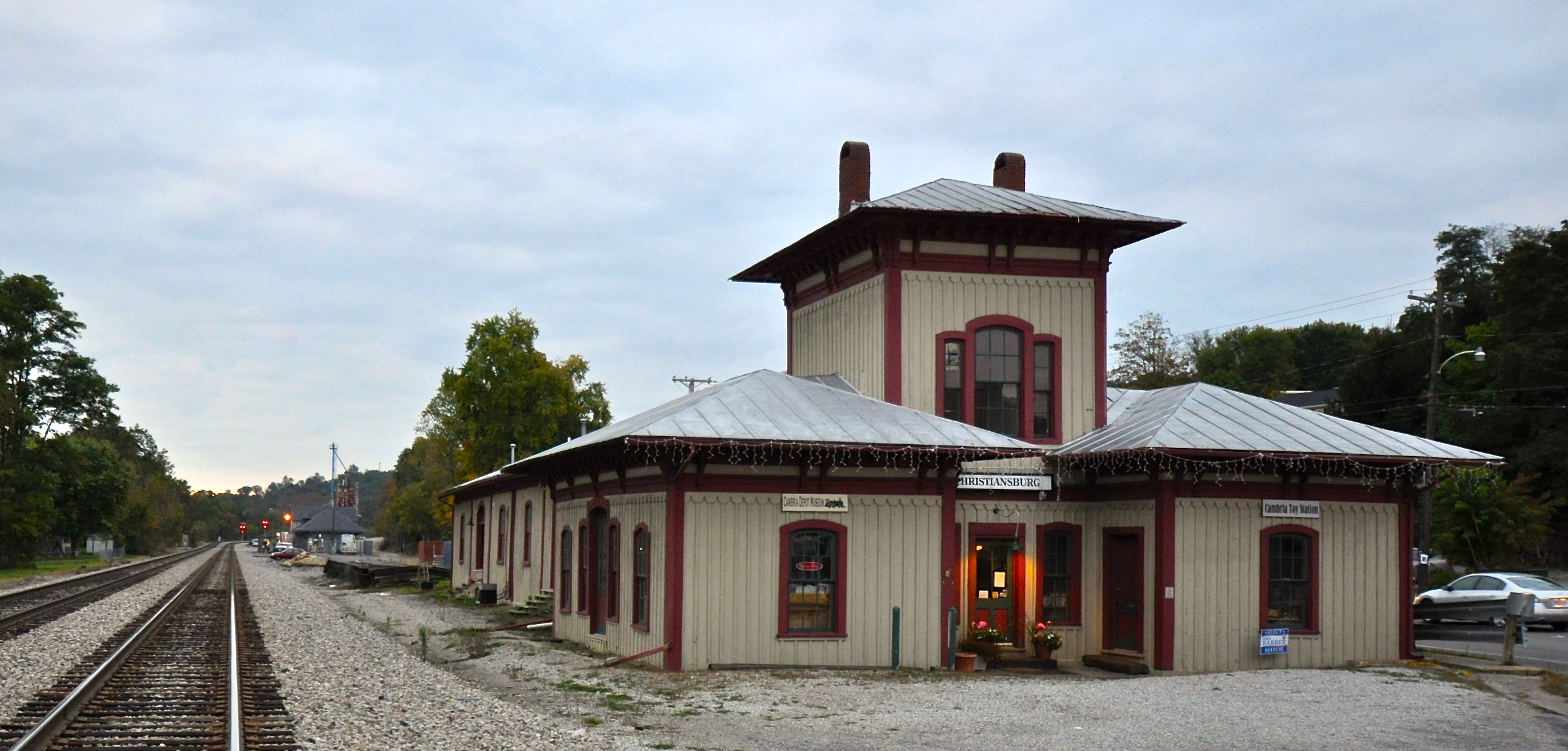
- Cambria Freight Station, September 2013

- Location within Virginia Location within the United States
- Location: 630 Depot St., Christiansburg, Virginia
- Coordinates: 37°8′28″N 80°24′15″W
- Area: 0.2 acres (0.081 ha)
- Built: c. 1868-1869
- Architectural style: Italianate
- NRHP reference No.: 85003351
- VLR No.: 154-0048-0001

Significant dates
- Added to NRHP: December 12, 1985
- Designated VLR: April 16, 1985

Cambria Freight Station, also known as Christiansburg Depot, is a historic freight station located at Christiansburg, Montgomery County, Virginia, US. It was built in 1868–1869, and is a wood-framed, one-story, U-shaped structure with a shallow hipped roof and deeply overhanging eaves in the Italianate style. A portion of the center section rises to form a tower-like second-story room, covered with an even shallower hipped roof. A long, one-story freight section extending eastward from the rear. The building also served as a passenger station, until Christiansburg station was built nearby in 1906. The building houses a local history museum known as the Cambria Depot Museum.

It was listed on the National Register of Historic Places in 1985. It is located in the Cambria Historic District.
