= Nealy Gordon Farm =

Historic house in Virginia, United States

- U.S. National Register of Historic Places
- Virginia Landmarks Register
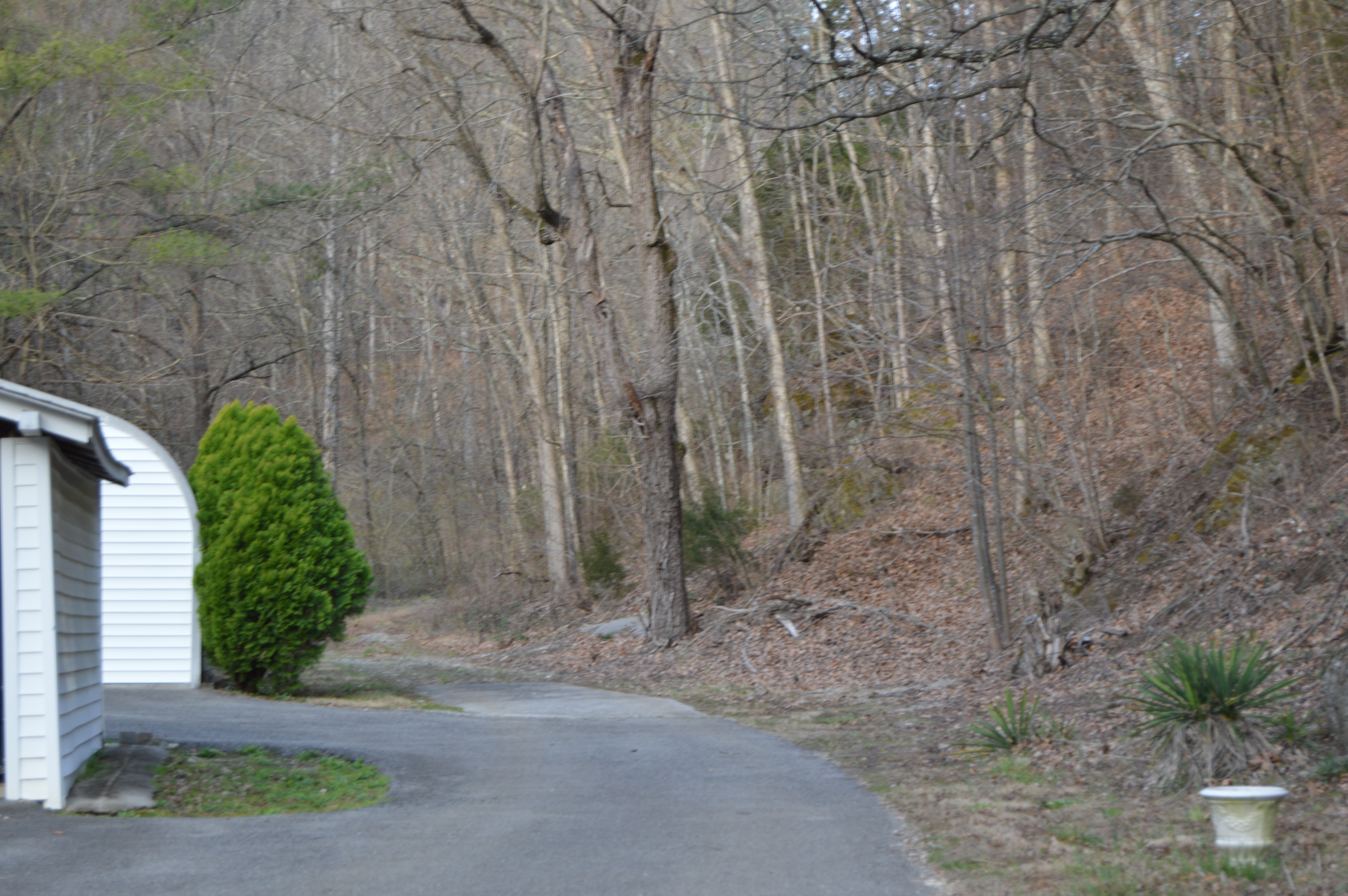
- Entrance to the farmstead

- Location within Virginia Location within the United States
- Location: Off VA 637, 0.5 miles (0.80 km) south of the junction with VA 603, Brush Harbor, Virginia
- Coordinates: 37°11′40″N 80°18′7″W
- Area: 3 acres (1.2 ha)
- Architectural style: Single-pen plan
- MPS: Montgomery County MPS
- NRHP reference No.: 89001805
- VLR No.: 060-0392

Significant dates
- Added to NRHP: November 13, 1989
- Designated VLR: June 20, 1989

Nealy Gordon Farm is a historic home and farm located at Brush Harbor, Montgomery County, Virginia. The farmhouse was built in three sections, beginning in the post-American Civil War era and ending around 1920. It is a small, two-story, saddlebag farmhouse, that started as a nearly square, single-pen dwelling made of log. Also on the property are the contributing frame, meathouse, privy, spring house (with lattice-enclosed forebay), hog shed, two large barns, and a corn crib.

It was listed on the National Register of Historic Places in 1989.
