= Vicker, Virginia =

Unincorporated community in Virginia, United States

- Unincorporated community
- Location within Shenandoah Valley Location within Virginia Location within the United States
- Coordinates: 37°09′49″N 80°29′16″W
- Country: United States
- State: Virginia
- County: Montgomery
- Elevation: 1,795 ft (547 m)
- Time zone: UTC−5 (Eastern (EST))
  - Summer (DST): UTC−4 (EDT)
- Area code: 540
- GNIS feature ID: 1493739

Vicker is an unincorporated community in Montgomery County, Virginia, United States. Vicker is located along the Norfolk Southern Christiansburg district rail line located 5 miles (8.0 km) west-northwest of Christiansburg.

Vicker was named in honor of the Vickers, or Vicars, family of pioneer settlers.

The Hornbarger Store was listed on the National Register of Historic Places in 1989.
