= Kentland Farm Historic and Archeological District =

Archaeological site in Virginia, United States

- U.S. National Register of Historic Places
- U.S. Historic district
- Virginia Landmarks Register
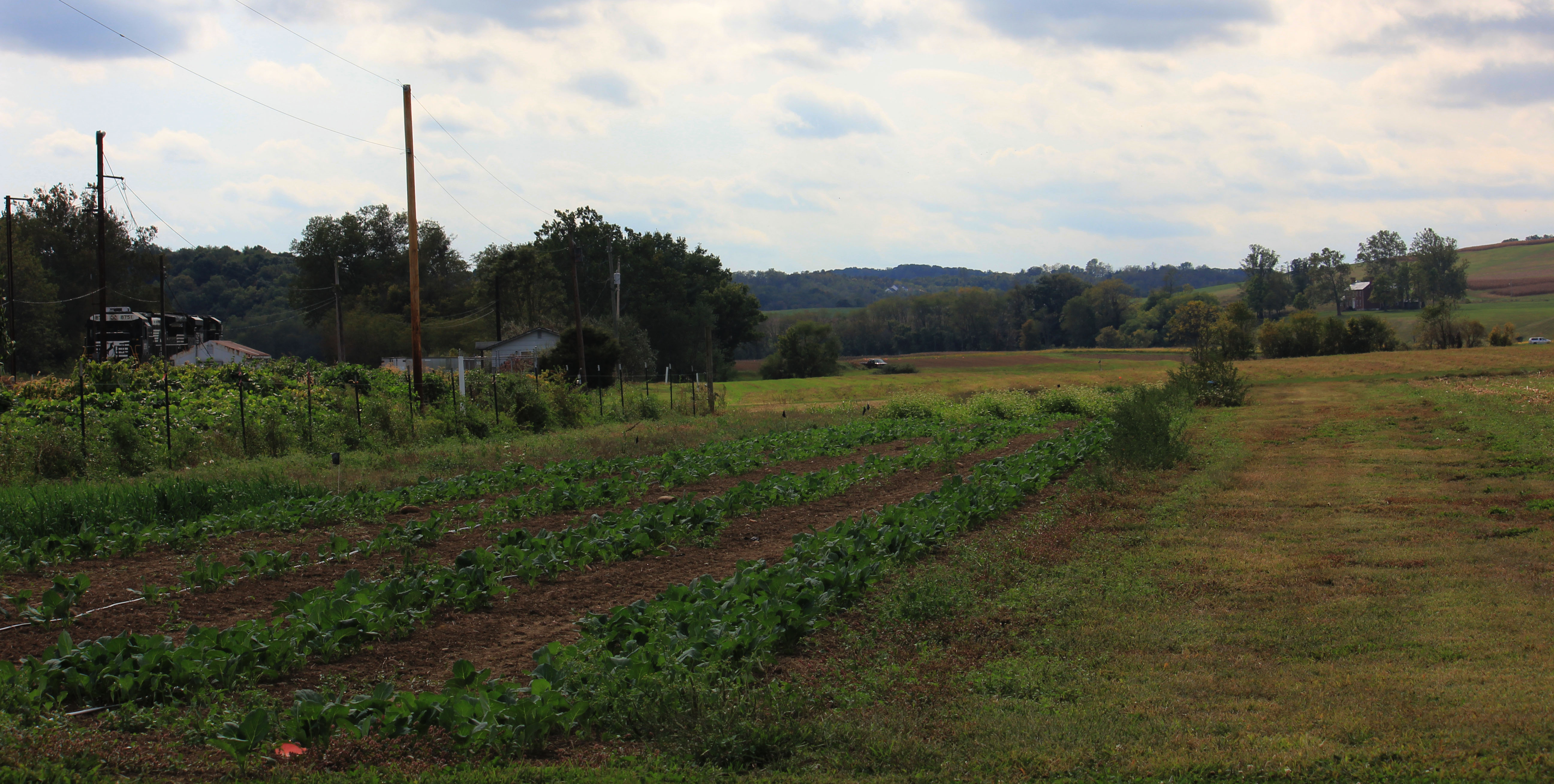
- Kentland Farm, September 2012

- Location within Virginia Location within the United States
- Location: At end of VA 623 along New River, near Blacksburg, Virginia
- Coordinates: 37°11′23″N 80°34′35″W
- Area: 350 acres (140 ha)
- Built: 1745, 1834-1835
- Built by: Swope, John
- Architectural style: Greek Revival, Federal
- MPS: Montgomery County MPS
- NRHP reference No.: 91000833, 06000801
- VLR No.: 060-0202

Significant dates
- Added to NRHP: July 3, 1991, September 6, 2006 (Boundary Increase)
- Designated VLR: April 17, 1991, June 8, 2006

Kentland Farm Historic and Archeological District is a historic home, archaeological site, and national historic district located near Blacksburg, Montgomery County, Virginia. The district encompasses a complex of 19th century agricultural outbuildings associated with a Federal and Greek Revival style brick dwelling built 1834–1835. Located in the district are significant archaeological resources that include a complex of Late Woodland village or camp sites.

== Native American Occupation ==
There is archeological evidence of a Late Woodland Period occupation on the site. "An archeological survey, conducted in 1991, confirmed that there is at least one extensive Late Woodland Period (AD 800-1600) prehistoric Indian village located on the farm. The investigation resulted in the recovery of hundreds of artifacts including weapons, stone tools and lithic debris from tool manufacture, fragments of aboriginal clay pottery, fire-cracked rocks from hearths or fireplaces, and other pieces. There is also evidence of Native American Shawnee habitation and migration in the late 1700s through Kentland Farm, Toms Creek, Virginia, and the New River (Kanawha River)."

== Kent Family ==
James Randal Kent acquired the farm in the early 1800s. According to the U.S. Census just prior to the Civil War, Kent produced corn, wheat, wool, butter, hay, clover seed, oats, flax seed, plus horses, cattle, sheep and swine, and owned 123 slaves. His property holdings were twice as valuable as the next wealthiest landowner in Montgomery County.

James Kent also owned the largest number of slaves in the region. Before the Civil War, along with his daughter who owned another farm across the river, that is now the site of the Radford Arsenal, they owned 250 slaves in 1860.

=== Farm Buildings ===
The site today still maintains several buildings from the Kent family farm period. This includes the antebellum brick manor house, and other buildings including a mill, numerous early farm buildings, garden areas, an antebellum cemetery for the Kent family and for the slave community.

Many of the farm buildings "were constructed in the 1950s and have been retrofitted over and over again. Some have been abandoned, like two old concrete block silos that still stand on the site." Other buildings are more recently constructed, from the 1980s to the present. Some of the old barns held unexpected finds, such as an old apple cider press and early chain saws, now refurbished and used by the students.

The house is considered modest today, but was built of brick to keep it cool during the summers. German stonemasons mined limestone from Brush Mountain, while slaves mined clay from nearby pits and made the bricks for the home and the six-sided smokehouse. "Other, long forgotten artisans worked on the house's interior, including a perfectly preserved and ornately carved wooden handrail on the main staircase."

The manor house was built in 1834-35 as a two-story, five-bay, Flemish bond brick I house, extended two story ell, stone foundation, metal-sheathed gable roof, Federal and Greek revival interior and exterior detailing, and adjacent cistern, two-story kitchen, and hexagonal brick meat house (Patricia Givens Johnson, 1995).

== Virginia Tech ==
Virginia Tech acquired the 1,785 acre Kentland Farm in a controversial land swap on December 31, 1986. The acquisition expanded the college farm to over 3,000 acres. The farm was purchased for the support of teaching, research, and extension programs in the Virginia Tech College of Agriculture and Life Sciences.

There has been some discussion about the preservation and demonstration of African American habitation on the site. This includes the location and preservation of slave cemeteries, cabins and other evidence of their use of the land.

in 2015, construction began on Virginia Tech's $14 million dairy center on Kentland Farm. Subsequently, Virginia Tech's 500-head dairy herd and production facility was relocated to the farm. Other projects at the time included improving soil characteristics on the farm.

== National Register of Historic Places ==
It was listed on the National Register of Historic Places in 1991, with a boundary increase in 2006.
