= Amiss–Palmer House =

Historic house in Virginia, United States

- U.S. National Register of Historic Places
- Virginia Landmarks Register
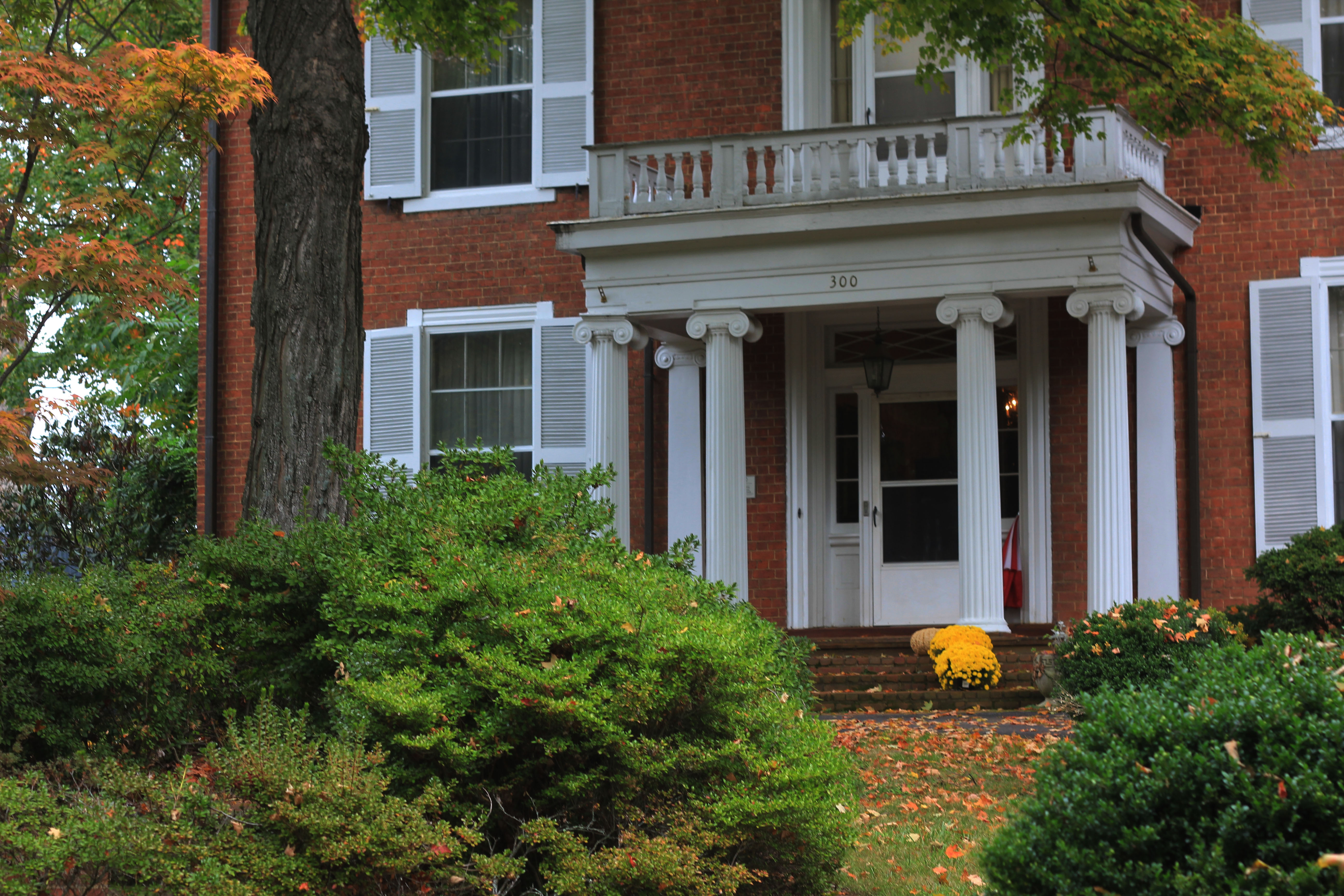
- Amiss–Palmer House, September 2012

- Location within Virginia Location within the United States
- Location: Mountain View Dr. and Penn St. off Eakin St., Blacksburg, Virginia
- Coordinates: 37°13′36″N 80°24′27″W
- Area: 3 acres (1.2 ha)
- Built: c. 1855
- Architectural style: Greek Revival, double-pile center-passage
- MPS: Montgomery County MPS
- NRHP reference No.: 89001804
- VLR No.: 150-0014

Significant dates
- Added to NRHP: November 13, 1989
- Designated VLR: June 20, 1989

Amiss–Palmer House, also known as the Palmer House, is a historic home located at Blacksburg, Montgomery County, Virginia. It was built the 1850s, and is a two-storey three-bay brick house with a hipped roof and pattern-book Greek Revival style elements. These elements include the front portico and frieze. It has a traditional double-pile center-passage form. Also on the property are the contributing kitchen, a two-storey three-bay log house and a smokehouse.

It was listed on the National Register of Historic Places in 1989.
