= Yellow Sulphur, Virginia =

Unincorporated community in Virginia, United States

- Unincorporated community
- Location within Virginia Location within the United States
- Coordinates: 37°10′17″N 80°23′48″W
- Country: United States
- State: Virginia
- County: Montgomery
- Elevation: 1,844 ft (562 m)
- Time zone: UTC−5 (Eastern (EST))
  - Summer (DST): UTC−4 (EDT)
- Area code: 540
- GNIS feature ID: 1493565

Yellow Sulphur is an unincorporated community in Montgomery County, Virginia, United States. Yellow Sulphur is located along State Route 643, 4.1 miles (6.6 km) south-southeast of Blacksburg.
