= List of bridges documented by the Historic American Engineering Record in Virginia =

This is a list of bridges documented by the Historic American Engineering Record in the US state of Virginia.

== Bridges ==
Survey No.	Name (as assigned by HAER)	Status	Type	Built	Documented	Carries	Crosses	Location	County	Coordinates
NC-38	Berry Hill Bridge	Replaced	Parker truss	1914	1985	SR 880 and SR 1761	Dan River	Cascade, Virginia, and Eden, North Carolina	Pittsylvania County, Virginia, and Rockingham County, North Carolina	36°32′29″N 79°36′17″W
VA-1	Humpback Covered Bridge	Bypassed	King post truss	1857	1963	James River and Kanawha Turnpike	Dunlap Creek	Covington	Alleghany	37°48′02″N 80°02′49″W
VA-6	Sixth Street Bridge	Demolished	Baltimore truss	1872	1983	Sixth Street	Blackwater Creek	Lynchburg	Independent city	37°25′06″N 79°08′34″W
VA-7	Roaring Run Bowstring Truss Bridge	Relocated	Bowstring arch truss	1878	1983	SR 657	Roaring Run	Ironto	Montgomery	37°14′21″N 80°13′28″W
VA-8	Valley Railroad, Folly Mills Creek Viaduct	Extant	Stone arch	1874	1983	Valley Railroad	Folly Mills Creek	Jolivue	Augusta	38°05′22″N 79°04′40″W
VA-10	James River and Kanawha Canal, Lickinghole Creek Aqueduct	Extant	Stone arch	1827	1971	James River and Kanawha Canal	Lickinghole Creek	Goochland	Goochland	37°41′24″N 77°55′52″W
VA-11	Cartersville Bridge	Ruin	Pratt truss	1884	1994	SR 45	James River	Cartersville	Cumberland	37°40′12″N 78°05′14″W
VA-12	Blue Ridge (C&O) Railroad, Culvert	Extant	Stone arch	1860	1984	Blue Ridge Railroad	Unnamed stream	Waynesboro	Augusta	38°02′34″N 78°51′50″W
VA-17	James River Suspension Bridge	Extant	Suspension	1930	1971	Pedestrian way	James River	Buchanan	Botetourt	37°31′49″N 79°40′40″W
VA-19	South River Pratt Through-Truss Bridge	Replaced	Pratt truss	1891	1971	SR 612	South River	Crimora	Augusta	38°09′22″N 78°51′17″W
VA-20	Marysville Covered Bridge	Destroyed	King post truss	1878	1960	SR 612	Seneca River	Gladys	Campbell	37°06′17″N 79°07′20″W
VA-26; VA-98	Middle River Pratt Through-Truss Bridge; Mount Meridian Bridge	Extant	Pratt truss	1907	1971; 1994	SR 769	Middle River	Weyers Cave and Grottoes	Augusta	38°15′43″N 78°51′43″W
VA-27	Marshall Street Viaduct	Demolished	Viaduct	1911	1983	Marshall Street	Chesapeake and Ohio Railway and Seaboard Air Line Railroad	Richmond	Independent city	37°32′13″N 77°25′31″W
VA-33	Daphna Creek Pratt Truss Bridge	Replaced	Pratt truss	1900	1983	SR 1414 (Holly Hill Street)	Daphna Creek	Broadway	Rockingham	
VA-35; VA-97	Linville Creek Bridge	Bypassed	Thacher truss	1898	1994	SR 1421	Linville Creek	Broadway	Rockingham	38°36′22″N 78°48′11″W
VA-36	J. H. C. Mann Bridge	Replaced	Parker truss	1912	1971	SR 631	Maury River	East Lexington	Rockbridge	37°48′46″N 79°26′57″W
VA-40	Triple Railroad Crossing	Extant	Steel built-up girder	1900	1971	Seaboard Air Line Railroad	Richmond and York River Railroad	Richmond	Independent city	37°31′55″N 77°25′54″W
VA-41	Seventh Street Bridge	Replaced	Baltimore truss	1893	1971	Seventh Street	James River and Kanawha Canal	Richmond	Independent city	37°32′05″N 77°26′33″W
VA-42-A	Mount Vernon Memorial Highway, Hunting Creek Bridge	Extant	Reinforced concrete closed-spandrel arch	1932	1989	George Washington Memorial Parkway	Hunting Creek	Alexandria	Independent city	38°47′24″N 77°03′05″W
VA-42-B	Mount Vernon Memorial Highway, Alexandria Avenue Bridge	Extant	Reinforced concrete rigid frame	1932	1989	Alexandria Avenue	George Washington Memorial Parkway	Alexandria	Independent city	38°44′48″N 77°02′56″W
VA-42-C	Mount Vernon Memorial Highway, Fort Hunt Overpass	Extant	Reinforced concrete closed-spandrel arch	1932	1989	George Washington Memorial Parkway	Fort Hunt Road	Mount Vernon	Fairfax	38°42′53″N 77°02′49″W
VA-42-D	Mount Vernon Memorial Highway, Little Hunting Creek Bridge	Extant	Reinforced concrete closed-spandrel arch	1932	1989	George Washington Memorial Parkway	Little Hunting Creek	Mount Vernon	Fairfax	38°42′47″N 77°04′27″W
VA-48-B	Colonial Parkway, Capitol Landing Underpass	Extant	Reinforced concrete closed-spandrel arch	1937	1988	US 60 / SR 5 (Page Street)	Colonial Parkway	Williamsburg	Independent city	37°16′42″N 76°41′25″W
VA-48-C	Colonial Parkway, C&O Railroad Underpass	Extant	Reinforced concrete closed-spandrel arch	1937	1988	SR 5 (Lafayette Street) and Chesapeake and Ohio Railway	Colonial Parkway	Williamsburg	Independent city	37°16′31″N 76°41′56″W
VA-48-E	Colonial Parkway, Ballard Creek Culvert	Extant	Reinforced concrete closed-spandrel arch	1931	1995	Colonial Parkway	Ballard Creek	Yorktown	York	37°14′31″N 76°31′31″W
VA-48-F	Colonial Parkway, Bracken Pond Culvert	Extant	Reinforced concrete closed-spandrel arch	1931	1995	Colonial Parkway	Bracken Pond	Yorktown	York	37°15′11″N 76°32′23″W
VA-48-H	Colonial Parkway, Indian Field Creek Bridge	Extant	Reinforced concrete cast-in-place slab	1933	1988	Colonial Parkway	Indian Field Creek	Yorktown	York	37°16′08″N 76°33′26″W
VA-48-I	Colonial Parkway, Felgates Creek Bridge	Extant	Prestressed concrete I-beam		1995	Colonial Parkway	Felgates Creek	Yorktown	York	37°16′27″N 76°35′10″W
VA-48-J	Colonial Parkway, Kings Creek Bridge	Extant	Steel rolled multi-beam		1995	Colonial Parkway	Kings Creek	Yorktown	York	37°16′24″N 76°36′23″W
VA-48-K	Colonial Parkway, Halfway Creek Bridge	Extant	Reinforced concrete cast-in-place slab	1942	1995	Colonial Parkway	Halfway Creek	Williamsburg	James City	37°14′03″N 76°41′50″W
VA-48-L	Colonial Parkway, Virginia Route 143 Bridge	Extant	Reinforced concrete closed-spandrel arch		1995	SR 143	Colonial Parkway	Williamsburg	Independent city	37°16′38″N 76°40′53″W
VA-48-M	Colonial Parkway, College Creek Bridge	Extant	Reinforced concrete cast-in-place slab		1995	Colonial Parkway	College Creek	Williamsburg	James City	37°13′34″N 76°41′41″W
VA-48-N	Colonial Parkway, Mill Creek Bridge	Extant	Steel rolled multi-beam	1956	1995	Colonial Parkway	Mill Creek	Williamsburg	James City	37°12′53″N 76°44′38″W
VA-48-O	Colonial Parkway, Powhatan Creek Bridge	Extant	Reinforced concrete cast-in-place slab		1995	Colonial Parkway	Powhatan Creek	Williamsburg	James City	37°13′25″N 76°46′40″W
VA-48-P	Colonial Parkway, Isthmus Bridge	Extant	Steel rolled multi-beam	1956	1995	Colonial Parkway		Williamsburg	James City	37°12′52″N 76°47′00″W
VA-48-Q	Colonial Parkway, Yorktown Creek Bridge	Extant	Reinforced concrete cast-in-place slab		1995	Colonial Parkway	Yorktown Creek	Yorktown	York	37°13′47″N 76°30′45″W
VA-48-R	Colonial Parkway, U.S. Route 17 Bridge	Extant	Reinforced concrete cast-in-place slab		1995	Colonial Parkway	US 17	Yorktown	York	37°13′44″N 76°30′54″W
VA-48-S	Colonial Parkway, Virginia Route 238 Bridge	Extant	Reinforced concrete closed-spandrel arch		1995	SR 1020	Colonial Parkway	Yorktown	York	37°14′22″N 76°31′25″W
VA-48-T	Colonial Parkway, Glebe Cut Culvert	Extant	Box culvert		1995	Colonial Parkway	Glebe Cut	Williamsburg	James City	37°12′49″N 76°44′17″W
VA-48-U	Colonial Parkway, Newport Avenue Bridge	Extant	Reinforced concrete closed-spandrel arch		1995	Newport Avenue	Colonial Parkway	Williamsburg	Independent city	37°16′0″N 76°42′8″W
VA-48-V	Colonial Parkway, North Pier Bridge	Extant	Reinforced concrete cast-in-place slab		1995	Colonial Parkway		Yorktown	York	37°15′18″N 76°32′29″W
VA-48-W	Colonial Parkway, Virginia Route 641 Bridge	Extant	Reinforced concrete cast-in-place slab		1995	Colonial Parkway	SR 641	Yorktown	York	37°16′53″N 76°37′38″W
VA-48-X	Colonial Parkway, Hubbards Lane Bridge	Extant	Reinforced concrete cast-in-place slab		1995	Colonial Parkway	Hubbards Lane	Yorktown	York	37°16′44″N 76°40′21″W
VA-48-Y	Colonial Parkway, Interstate 64 Bridge	Extant	Reinforced concrete closed-spandrel arch		1995	I-64	Colonial Parkway	Yorktown	York	37°16′40″N 76°39′46″W
VA-48-Z	Colonial Parkway, Virginia Route 199 Bridge	Extant	Reinforced concrete closed-spandrel arch	1966	1995	SR 199	Colonial Parkway	Williamsburg	James City	37°14′55″N 76°42′01″W
VA-48-AA	Colonial Parkway, Parkway Drive Bridge	Extant	Reinforced concrete closed-spandrel arch	1972	1995	Parkway Drive	Colonial Parkway	Williamsburg	Independent city	37°16′37″N 76°41′07″W
VA-49	South Branch Quantico Creek Bridge	Extant	Parker truss	1940	1988	NPS Route 11	Quantico Creek south branch	Dumfries	Prince William	38°34′04″N 77°21′52″W
VA-50	North Branch Quantico Creek Bridge	Extant	Pratt truss	1916	1988	NPS Route 406	Quantico Creek north branch	Dumfries	Prince William	38°34′22″N 77°20′50″W
VA-52	Shenandoah River Bridge	Demolished	Parker truss	1916	1990	SR 767	Shenandoah River north fork	Quicksburg	Shenandoah	38°41′26″N 78°39′49″W
VA-57	George P. Coleman Memorial Bridge	Extant	Swing span	1952	1993	US 17	York River	Yorktown	York	37°14′33″N 76°30′25″W
VA-58	Tipers Bridge	Replaced	Swing span	1934	1991	SR 200	Great Wicomico River	Tipers	Northumberland	37°50′47″N 76°22′04″W
VA-62	Walkerton Bridge	Extant (partial)	Swing span	1937	1992	SR 629	Mattaponi River	Walkerton	King and Queen	37°43′27″N 77°01′29″W
VA-63	Second Street Bridge	Demolished	Reinforced concrete through arch	1934	1991	Second Street	Richmond, Fredericksburg and Potomac Railroad	Richmond	Independent city	37°32′16″N 77°26′48″W
VA-66	Stone Bridge	Bypassed	Stone arch	1884	1962	Fauquier and Alexandria Turnpike	Bull Run	Manassas National Battlefield Park	Prince William	38°49′27″N 77°30′13″W
VA-67	Fifth Street Viaduct	Replaced	Viaduct	1933	1992	Fifth Street	Bacon's Quarter Branch	Richmond	Independent city	37°33′12″N 77°25′39″W
VA-68	New River Bridge	Bypassed	Pennsylvania truss	1916	1993	SR 623	New River	Pembroke	Giles	37°18′53″N 80°38′37″W
VA-70	Dead Run Bridge	Extant	Steel plate girder	1963	1994	George Washington Memorial Parkway	Dead Run	McLean	Fairfax	38°57′51″N 77°10′27″W
VA-71	Turkey Run Bridge	Extant	Steel plate girder	1961	1994	George Washington Memorial Parkway	Turkey Run and access road	McLean	Fairfax	38°57′48″N 77°09′26″W
VA-72	CIA Entrance Overpass	Extant	Prestressed concrete I-beam	1959	1994	CIA access road	George Washington Memorial Parkway	McLean	Fairfax	38°57′29″N 77°08′37″W
VA-73	Route 123 Overpass	Extant	Prestressed concrete I-beam	1959	1994	SR 123 (Leesburg Road)	George Washington Memorial Parkway	McLean	Fairfax	38°56′20″N 77°08′01″W
VA-74	Pimmit Run Bridge	Extant	Steel plate girder	1959	1994	George Washington Memorial Parkway	Pimmit Run	McLean	Fairfax	38°55′56″N 77°07′27″W
VA-75	Glebe Road Bridge	Extant	Steel plate girder	1959	1994	George Washington Memorial Parkway	SR 120 (Glebe Road)	Arlington	Arlington	38°55′43″N 77°07′07″W
VA-76	Gulf Branch Bridge	Extant	Steel plate girder	1959	1994	George Washington Memorial Parkway	Gulf Branch	Arlington	Arlington	38°55′29″N 77°06′51″W
VA-77	Donaldson Run Bridge	Extant	Steel plate girder	1959	1994	George Washington Memorial Parkway	Donaldson Run	Arlington	Arlington	38°55′11″N 77°06′29″W
VA-78	Windy Run Bridge	Extant	Steel plate girder	1959	1994	George Washington Memorial Parkway	Windy Run	Arlington	Arlington	38°54′20″N 77°05′41″W
VA-79	Spout Run Arch Bridge	Extant	Reinforced concrete open-spandrel arch	1959	1994	George Washington Memorial Parkway eastbound	SR 124 (Spout Run Parkway) westbound and Spout Run	Arlington	Arlington	38°54′06″N 77°05′00″W
VA-80	Lower Level Spout Run Bridge	Extant	Reinforced concrete rigid frame	1958	1994	George Washington Memorial Parkway westbound	Spout Run	Arlington	Arlington	38°54′08″N 77°04′58″W
VA-81	Rosslyn Ramp Bridge	Extant	Steel plate girder	1959	1994	Entrance ramp to George Washington Memorial Parkway westbound	George Washington Memorial Parkway eastbound	Arlington	Arlington	38°54′02″N 77°04′25″W
VA-82	North Airport Entry Underpass	Extant	Steel plate girder	1941	1994	George Washington Memorial Parkway	National Airport north entrance	Arlington	Arlington	38°51′26″N 77°02′49″W
VA-83	Four Mile Run Bridge	Replaced	Steel rolled multi-beam	1931	1994	George Washington Memorial Parkway	Four Mile Run	Arlington	Arlington	38°50′27″N 77°02′52″W
VA-84	South Airport Exit Overpass	Extant	Reinforced concrete rigid frame	1965	1994	National Airport south exit	George Washington Memorial Parkway	Arlington	Arlington	38°50′49″N 77°02′56″W
VA-85	Route 1–National Airport Overpass	Extant	Reinforced concrete rigid frame	1965	1994	SR 233 (Airport Access Road)	George Washington Memorial Parkway	Arlington	Arlington	38°50′58″N 77°02′53″W
VA-86	Spout Run Bridge	Extant	Reinforced concrete rigid frame	1949	1994	SR 124 (Spout Run Parkway) westbound	Spout Run	Arlington	Arlington	38°54′06″N 77°04′59″W
VA-87	Theodore Roosevelt Island Pedestrian Bridge	Extant	Prestressed concrete I-beam	1978	1994	Theodore Roosevelt Island pedestrian trail	Potomac River	Arlington	Arlington	38°53′45″N 77°03′58″W
VA-88	Spout Run Parkway Culvert	Extant	Reinforced concrete rigid frame	1947	1994	SR 124 (Spout Run Parkway) eastbound	Spout Run	Arlington	Arlington	38°53′57″N 77°05′22″W
VA-89	Johnson Grove Pedestrian Bridge	Extant	Timber girder	1977	1994	Johnson Grove pedestrian trail	Boundary Channel	Arlington	Arlington	38°52′44″N 77°03′11″W
VA-90	Richmond, Fredericksburg and Potomac Railroad Underpass	Extant	Steel built-up girder	1932	1994	Richmond, Fredericksburg and Potomac Railroad	George Washington Memorial Parkway	Arlington	Arlington	38°52′15″N 77°02′30″W
VA-91	Roaches Run Culvert	Extant	Box culvert	1932	1994	George Washington Memorial Parkway	Roaches Run	Arlington	Arlington	38°51′49″N 77°02′34″W
VA-92	Original Airport Entrance Overpass	Demolished	Reinforced concrete closed-spandrel arch	1931	1994	George Washington Memorial Parkway	National Airport entrance road	Arlington	Arlington	
VA-93	Joshua Falls Bridge	Replaced	Pratt truss	1901	1993	CSX Transportation	James River	Lynchburg	Campbell	37°25′02″N 79°03′12″W
VA-94	Fox Bridge No. 1936	Replaced	Warren truss	1926	1994	US 1 southbound	North Anna River	Ashland	Hanover	37°53′22″N 77°27′59″W
VA-95	Fox Bridge No. 1937	Replaced	Warren truss	1935	1994	US 1 northbound	North Anna River	Ashland	Hanover	37°53′22″N 77°27′58″W
VA-96	Kelly's Ford Bridge	Replaced	Pratt truss	1898	1994	SR 620	Rappahannock River	Kelly's Ford	Culpeper and Fauquier	38°28′38″N 77°46′48″W
VA-99	Carpenter's Ford Bridge	Extant	Pratt truss	1904	1994	SR 775	Middle River	Crimora	Augusta	38°14′28″N 78°52′51″W
VA-100	Knightly Bridge	Extant	Parker truss	1915	1994	SR 778	Middle River	Knightly	Augusta	38°13′49″N 78°55′34″W
VA-101	Kerr's Crossing Bridge	Extant	Pratt truss	1899	1994	SR 907	Christians Creek	Staunton	Augusta	38°11′32″N 78°56′06″W
VA-102	Goshen Bridge	Extant	Pratt truss	1890	1994	SR 746	Calfpasture River	Goshen	Rockbridge	37°59′08″N 79°29′38″W
VA-103	Wallace Mill Bridge	Replaced	Pratt truss	1914	1994	SR 683	Little Calfpasture River	Craigsville	Augusta	38°02′54″N 79°23′35″W
VA-104	McPherson's Ford Bridge	Replaced	Pratt truss	1897	1994	SR 633	Cowpasture River	Clifton Forge	Alleghany	37°47′31″N 79°45′33″W
VA-105	Phoenix Bridge	Extant	Whipple truss	1887	1994	SR 685	Craig Creek	Eagle Rock	Botetourt	37°38′57″N 79°49′52″W
VA-106	Mansion Truss Bridge	Replaced	Parker truss	1903	1994	SR 640	Staunton River	Altavista	Campbell	37°07′23″N 79°14′38″W
VA-107	Oak Ridge Bridge	Extant	Pratt truss	1882	1994	SR 653	Southern Railway	Shipman	Nelson	37°42′11″N 78°52′16″W
VA-108	Clarkton Bridge	Demolished	Parker truss	1902	1994	SR 620	Staunton River	Nathalie	Charlotte	36°58′49″N 78°53′34″W
VA-109	Virginia DOT Bridge No. 6023	Extant	Pratt truss	1902	1994	SR 646	Norfolk Southern Railway	Nokesville	Prince William	38°42′26″N 77°33′51″W
VA-110	Virginia DOT Bridge No. 6051	Extant	Pratt truss	1889	1994	SR 673 (Featherbottom Road)	Catoctin Creek	Waterford	Loudoun	39°13′56″N 77°35′31″W
VA-111	Gholson Bridge	Extant	Pratt truss	1884	1994	SR 715	Meherrin River	Lawrenceville	Brunswick	36°43′02″N 77°49′52″W
VA-112	Waterloo Bridge	Extant	Pratt truss	1885	1994	SR 613	Rappahannock River	Waterloo	Fauquier and Culpeper	38°41′45″N 77°54′22″W
VA-113	Jackson's Ferry Bridge	Replaced	Cantilever	1931	1995	US 52	New River	Austinville	Wythe	36°52′17″N 80°52′08″W
VA-115	Colonial National Historical Park Roads and Bridges	Extant		1931	1995	Colonial Parkway		Yorktown to Jamestown	York and James City	37°12′56″N 76°42′57″W
VA-120	U.S. Route 1 Nottoway River Bridge	Replaced	Reinforced concrete through arch	1927	1996	US 1	Nottoway River	McKenney	Dinwiddie	36°56′45″N 77°44′01″W
VA-121	Capital Beltway Overpass	Replaced	Reinforced concrete T-beam	1931	1994	George Washington Memorial Parkway	I-95 / I-495 (Capital Beltway)	Alexandria	Independent city	38°47′37″N 77°02′58″W
VA-122	Henry G. Shirley Memorial Highway Overpasses	Extant	Reinforced concrete rigid frame	1932	1994	I-395 (Henry G. Shirley Memorial Highway)	George Washington Memorial Parkway	Arlington	Arlington	38°52′23″N 77°02′41″W
VA-124	Appomattox Bridge	Replaced	Reinforced concrete T-beam	1925	1997	US 1	Appomattox River	Petersburg	Independent city	37°14′10″N 77°24′14″W
VA-126	Link Farm Covered Bridge	Extant	Howe truss	1912	2004	Covered Bridge Lane	Sinking Creek	Newport	Giles	37°18′40″N 80°31′01″W
VA-136	James River and Kanawha Canal, Hardware River Aqueduct	Extant	Stone arch	1827		James River and Kanawha Canal	Hardware River	Hardware	Fluvanna	
VA-137	James River and Kanawha Canal, Byrd Creek Aqueduct	Extant	Stone arch	1827		James River and Kanawha Canal	Byrd Creek	Elk Hill	Goochland	
VA-138	James River and Kanawha Canal, Little Creek Culvert	Extant	Stone arch	1827		James River and Kanawha Canal	Little Creek	Irwin	Goochland	
VA-141	Fort Belvoir Railroad Bridge	Demolished	Steel built-up girder	1928	2013	Fort Belvoir Military Railroad	US 1	Accotink	Fairfax	38°42′32″N 77°09′18″W

== See also ==
- List of tunnels documented by the Historic American Engineering Record in Virginia
