= List of bridges on the National Register of Historic Places in Virginia =

This is a list of bridges and tunnels on the National Register of Historic Places in the U.S. state of Virginia.

Name	Image	Built	Listed	Location	County	Type
Appomattox River Bridge	Appomattox River Bridge	1930	2005-07-27	Appomattox; 37°23′1″N 78°47′22″W	Appomattox	
Blackford Bridge		1889	2010-06-24	Lebanon vicinity	Russell	
Bob White Covered Bridge		1820, 1821	1973-05-22	Woolwine; 36°46′45″N 80°14′53″W	Patrick	Burr arch truss
Bowstring Truss Bridge (Ironto, Virginia)		1878	2013-01-02	Ironto; 37°14′21″N 80°13′28″W	Montgomery	Truss
Bridge at Falling Creek		ca. 1823, 1834, 1921	1995-10-12	Richmond; 37°26′22″N 77°26′22″W	Chesterfield	Stone arch, collapsed since 1972
Broad Run Bridge and Tollhouse		1820	1970-04-17	Sterling; 39°2′48″N 77°25′59″W	Loudoun	
Cartersville Bridge		1822, 1842, 1883	1972-09-14	Cartersville; 37°40′12″N 78°5′14″W	Cumberland	Pratt truss
Catoctin Creek Bridge	Catoctin Creek Bridge	1900, 1932	1974-06-25	Waterford; 39°13′56″N 77°35′31″W	Loudoun	Pratt truss
Clarkton Bridge	Clarkton Bridge	1902	2007-01-26	Nathalie; 36°58′49″N 78°53′34″W	Charlotte	Pratt through truss
Crab Run Lane Truss Bridge	Crab Run Lane Truss Bridge	1896	2009-09-16	McDowell; 38°20′06″N 79°29′24″W	Highland	Truss
Gholson Bridge	Gholson Bridge	1884	1978-05-05	Lawrenceville; 36°43′0″N 77°49′53″W	Brunswick	Pratt truss
Goose Creek Stone Bridge	Goose Creek Stone Bridge	1810	1974-10-09	Atoka	Loudoun	
Goshen Land Company Bridge	Goshen Land Company Bridge	1890	1978-05-15	Goshen; 37°59′7″N 79°29′39″W	Rockbridge	Pratt through truss
Hibbs Bridge	Hibbs Bridge	1829	2011-03-01	Mountville vicinity 39°02′17″N 77°43′27″W	Loudoun	Stone arch
High Bridge	High Bridge	1854	2008-09-12	Farmville vicinity 37°18′39.52″N 78°19′5.74″W	Cumberland	
Humpback Covered Bridge		1835	1969-10-01	Callaghan; 37°47′50″N 80°2′48″W	Alleghany	
Jack's Creek Covered Bridge		1914	1973-05-22	Woolwine; 36°45′51″N 80°16′25″W	Patrick	
Francis Scott Key Bridge		1917, 1923, 1939	1996-03-01	Arlington; 38°54′8″N 77°4′13″W	Arlington	
Linville Creek Bridge	Linville Creek Bridge	1898	1978-04-15	Broadway; 38°36′22″N 78°48′13″W	Rockingham	Hybrid Pratt-Warren truss
Meems Bottom Covered Bridge	Meems Bottom Covered Bridge	1893, 1894	1975-06-10	Mt. Jackson; 38°43′14″N 78°39′20″W	Shenandoah	Burr arch truss
Natural Bridge		1774	1997-11-18	Natural Bridge; 37°37′39″N 79°32′43″W	Rockbridge	Natural stone arch
Nokesville Truss Bridge		1882	1978-04-15	Nokesville; 38°42′25″N 77°33′52″W	Prince William	Single span Pratt truss
Norfolk Southern Six Mile Bridge No. 58		1853, 1870, 1886, 1899, 1920	1995-10-12	Lynchburg	Amherst, Campbell	Pratt truss
Oak Ridge Railroad Overpass	Oak Ridge Bridge	1882	1978-04-15	Shipman; 37°42′11″N 78°52′16″W	Nelson	Pratt truss
Orange and Alexandria Railroad Bridge Piers		1861, 1865	1989-08-08	Manassas Park	Prince William	
Orange and Alexandria Railroad Hooff's Run Bridge	Orange and Alexandria Railroad Bridge Piers	1856, 1872, by 1885	2003-08-07	Alexandria; 38°48′10″N 77°3′32″W	Alexandria City	Stone-arch railroad bridge
Phoenix Bridge	Phoenic Bridge	1887	1975-06-10	Eagle Rock; 37°39′16″N 79°50′23″W	Botetourt	Trapezoidal Whipple truss
Valley Railroad Stone Bridge	Valley Railroad Stone Bridge	1874	1974-11-19	Jolivue; 38°5′21″N 79°4′40″W	Augusta	
Virginian Railway Underpass	Virginian Railway Underpass	1906	1989-11-13	New Ellett; 37°11′58″N 80°21′51″W	Montgomery	Horseshoe-arch underpass
Wolf Creek Bridge	Wolf Creek Bridge (Rocky Gap, Virginia)	1927	2011-01-07	Rocky Gap vicinity 37°14′24″N 81°5′56″W	Bland	Truss
Bridge over North Fork of Roanoke River		1892	removed 2001-03-19	Ironto	Montgomery	Pratt through truss
Mansion Truss Bridge		1903	removed 2005-06-10	Mansion	Campbell	Camelback through truss
Springwood Truss Bridge		1883, 1884	removed 2001-03-19	Springwood	Botetourt	Wooden truss
