= Wolf Creek Bridge =

Wolf Creek Bridge may refer to:

- Wolf Creek Bridge (Rocky Gap, Virginia), listed on the NRHP in Bland County, Virginia
- Wolf Creek Bridge (Dunbar, Nebraska), listed on the National Register of Historic Places (NRHP) in Otoe County, Nebraska
