= Bridge over North Fork of Roanoke River =

- Formerly listed on the U.S. National Register of Historic Places
- Virginia Landmarks Register
- Nearest city: Ironto, Virginia
- Area: less than one acre
- Built: 1892
- Built by: King Iron Bridge & Manufacturing Co.
- Architectural style: Through Pratt truss bridge
- MPS: Montgomery County MPS
- NRHP reference No.: 89001802
- VLR No.: 060-0394

Significant dates
- Added to NRHP: January 10, 1991
- Designated VLR
- Removed from NRHP: March 19, 2001

Bridge over North Fork of Roanoke River was a historic Pratt truss bridge located near Ironto, Montgomery County, Virginia. It was built by the King Bridge Company in 1892, and was a pin-connected through Pratt truss spanning 105 feet (32 m) between cast-in-place concrete abutments. It had ornamental steel lattice portal bracing around the top of the portals. The bridge was removed in 1995–1996, and replaced with new bridge.

The bridge was listed on the National Register of Historic Places in 1989 and delisted in 2001.

== See also ==
- List of bridges on the National Register of Historic Places in Virginia
