= Bowstring Truss Bridge (Ironto, Virginia) =

- U.S. National Register of Historic Places
- Virginia Landmarks Register
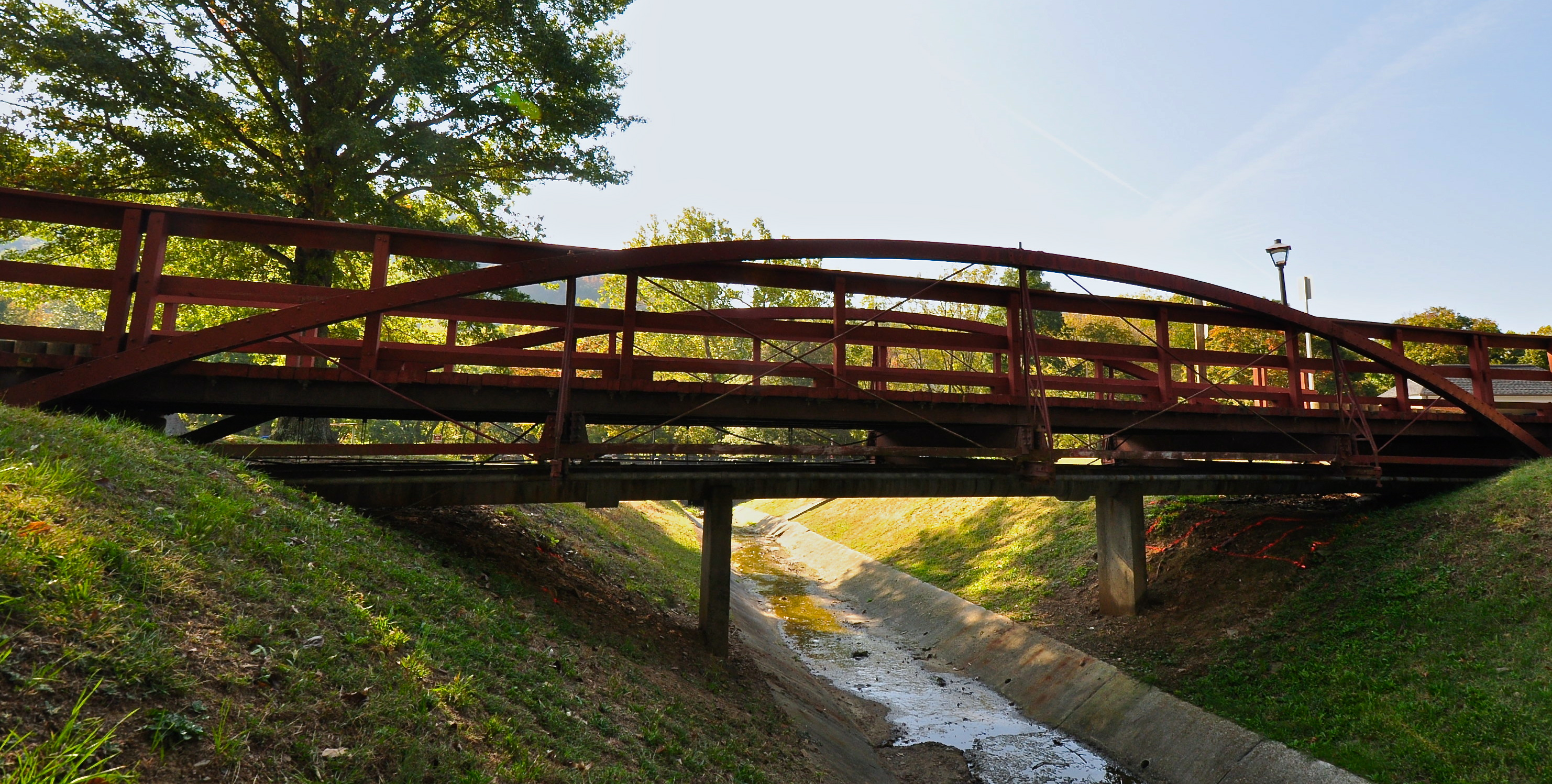
- Bowstring Truss Bridge, October 2013.

- Location within Virginia Location within the United States
- Location: I-81, Ironto Rest Area, near Ironto, Virginia
- Coordinates: 37°14′21″N 80°13′28″W
- Area: 0.15 acres (0.061 ha)
- Built: 1878
- Built by: King Iron Bridge Company, Cleveland, Ohio
- Architectural style: Tubular arch pony truss
- NRHP reference No.: 12001136
- VLR No.: 060-5066

Significant dates
- Added to NRHP: January 2, 2013
- Designated VLR: June 19, 2008

Bowstring Truss Bridge, also known as the Roaring Run Bowstring Truss Bridge and King Tubular Arch Truss Bridge, is a historic bowstring truss bridge located at the Ironto Rest Area near Ironto, Montgomery County, Virginia. It was built by the King Bridge Company in 1878, and is a single-span, four-panel tubular arch pony truss. It measures 55 feet (17 m) long, 12 feet (3.7 m) wide, and 6 feet 6 inches (1.98 m) high with an open roadway width of approximately 9 feet 6 inches (2.90 m). The bridge was partially disassembled and moved from its original location to a second site during the 1930s, where it remained until moved to its current location in 1977.

The bridge was documented by the Historic American Engineering Record in 1983 and listed on the National Register of Historic Places in 2013.

This is the oldest metal bridge in the entire Commonwealth of Virginia. Use of the historical bridge is now limited to pedestrians only with no more than three pedestrians at a time permitted on the bridge.

== See also ==
- List of bridges documented by the Historic American Engineering Record in Virginia
- List of bridges on the National Register of Historic Places in Virginia
