= Catoctin Creek Bridge =

- U.S. National Register of Historic Places
- Virginia Landmarks Register
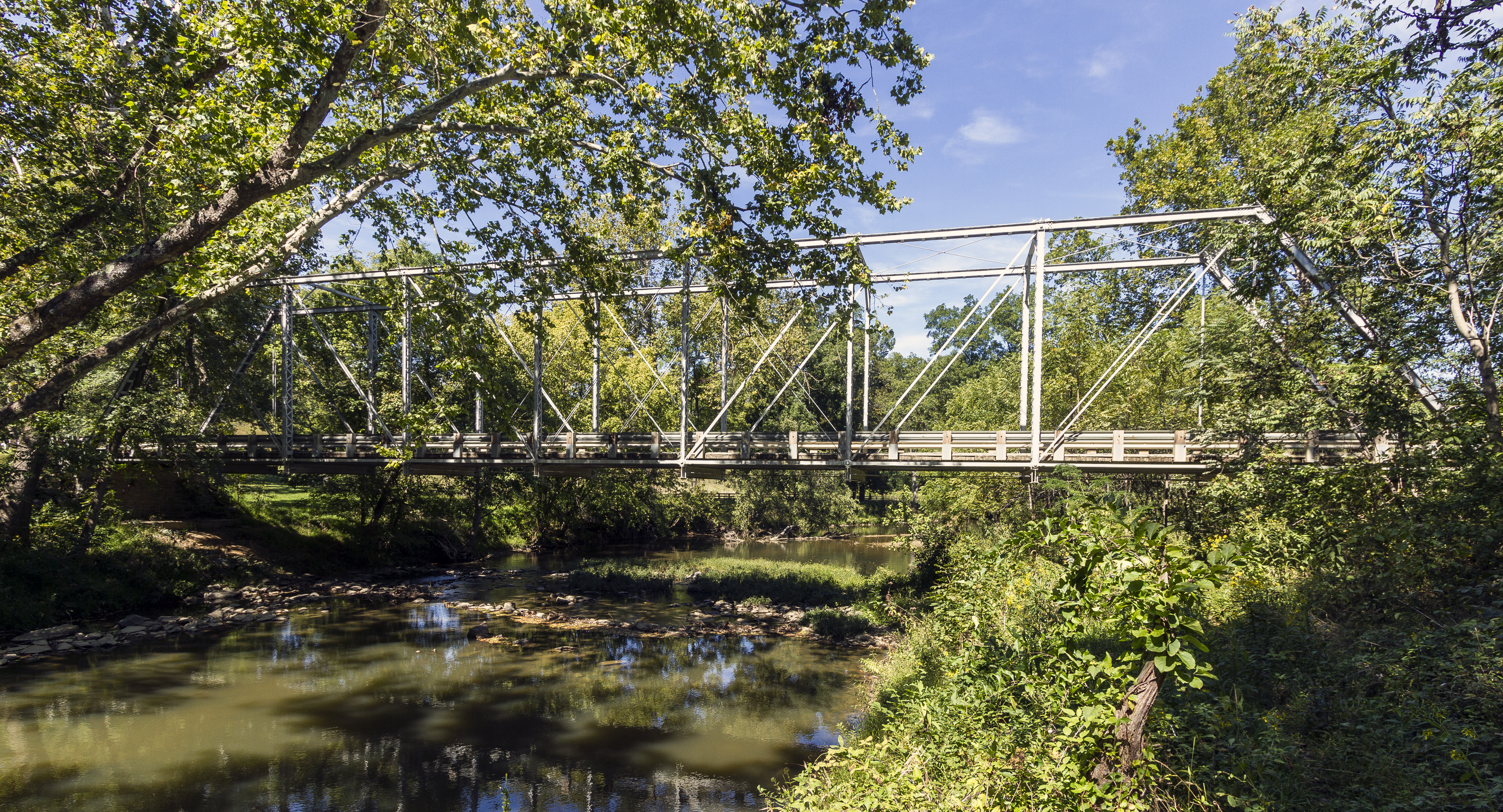
- Catoctin Creek Bridge, September 2012

- Location within Northern Virginia Location within Virginia Location within the United States
- Location: Rte. 673, north of Waterford, near Waterford, Virginia
- Coordinates: 39°13′56″N 77°35′31″W
- Area: less than one acre
- Built: 1900
- Architect: Alfred Staunton, Variety Iron Works
- Architectural style: Pratt truss
- NRHP reference No.: 74002136
- VLR No.: 053-0131

Significant dates
- Added to NRHP: June 25, 1974
- Designated VLR: January 15, 1974

The Catoctin Creek Bridge crosses over Catoctin Creek in Loudoun County, Virginia.

It currently carries Virginia Route 673, also known as Featherbed Lane. Originally located at a crossing of nearby Goose Creek, carrying the Leesburg Turnpike, it was later Virginia State Route 7, but was relocated in 1932 to its present location.

It was placed on the National Register of Historic Places on June 24, 1974. It was renamed to John G. Lewis Memorial Bridge in 2015 for the local preservationist who aided in its placement on the National Register in order to preserve the surrounding landscape and prevent the construction of a dam at Taylorstown which would have flooded the area.

== Description ==
The bridge is a nine-panel iron Pratt truss bridge, fabricated by the Variety Iron Works of Cleveland, Ohio and first erected around 1889. It is a single span of 159 feet (48 m), with a roadway width of 11.18 feet (3.41 m). The deck is made of timbers. It is one of the longest 19th-century metal truss bridges remaining in Virginia.

== See also ==
- List of bridges documented by the Historic American Engineering Record in Virginia
- List of bridges on the National Register of Historic Places in Virginia
