= Gholson Bridge =

- U.S. National Register of Historic Places
- Virginia Landmarks Register
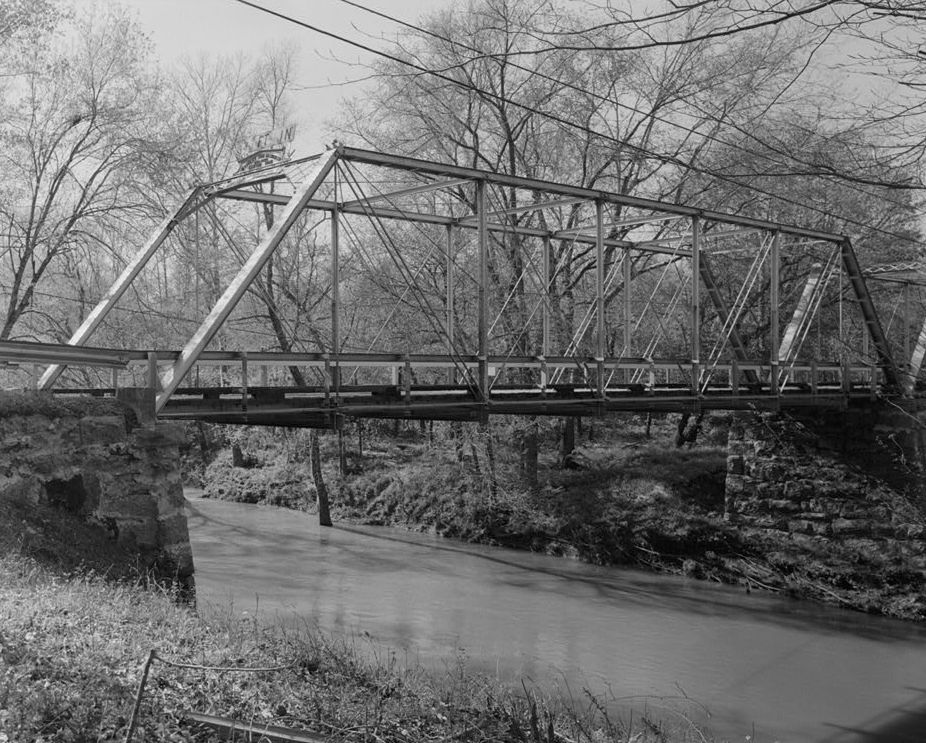
- Gholson Bridge, HAER Photo, April 1994

- Location within Virginia Location within the United States
- Location: S of Lawrenceville on VA 715 at Meherrin River, near Lawrenceville, Virginia
- Coordinates: 36°43′02″N 77°49′52″W
- Area: less than one acre
- Built: 1884
- Built by: Wrought Iron Bridge Company
- Architectural style: Pratt Truss
- NRHP reference No.: 78003010
- VLR No.: 011-0080

Significant dates
- Added to NRHP: May 5, 1978
- Designated VLR: November 15, 1977

Gholson Bridge is a historic metal Pratt truss bridge spanning the Meherrin River near Lawrenceville, Brunswick County, Virginia. It was built in 1884 by the Wrought Iron Bridge Company. It consists of two spans. One span is 84 feet (26 m) long and the second is 100 feet 4 inches (30.58 m). It sits on an ashlar sandstone substructure.

The bridge was listed on the National Register of Historic Places in 1978.

== See also ==
- List of bridges documented by the Historic American Engineering Record in Virginia
- List of bridges on the National Register of Historic Places in Virginia
