= Oak Ridge Railroad Overpass =

- U.S. National Register of Historic Places
- Virginia Landmarks Register
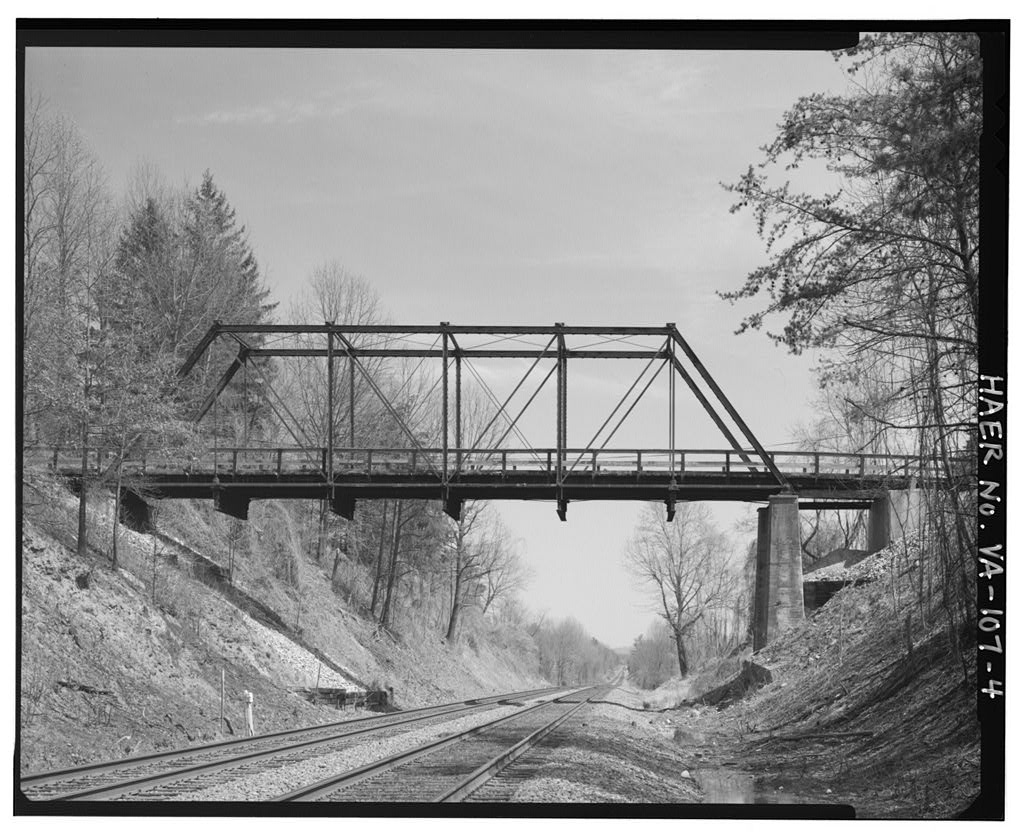
- Oak Ridge Bridge, HAER Photo, April 1994

- Location within Virginia Location within the United States
- Location: SW of Shipman on State Route 653, near Shipman, Virginia
- Coordinates: 37°42′11″N 78°52′16″W
- Area: less than one acre
- Built: 1882
- Built by: Keystone Bridge Co.
- Architectural style: Pratt truss
- NRHP reference No.: 78003033
- VLR No.: 062-0085

Significant dates
- Added to NRHP: April 15, 1978
- Designated VLR: November 15, 1977

Oak Ridge Railroad Overpass is a historic Pratt truss bridge located near Shipman, Nelson County, Virginia. It was built by the Keystone Bridge Company in 1882, and is a single-span, through Pratt truss with two wooden beam approach spans. The span length is 100 feet (30 m). The approach spans are 19 feet (5.8 m) long. It carries VA State Route 653 over the busy Norfolk Southern Washington District, part of the former Southern Main Line between Washington, D.C., and Atlanta.

It was listed on the National Register of Historic Places in 1978.

It was removed and dismantled in November of 2024 and is scheduled to be replaced in November of 2025 by a modern bridge.

== See also ==
- List of bridges documented by the Historic American Engineering Record in Virginia
- List of bridges on the National Register of Historic Places in Virginia
