= The Stone House, Manassas National Battlefield Park =

Historic building in Virginia, USA

- Stone House, Manassas National Battlefield
- U.S. Historic district – Contributing property
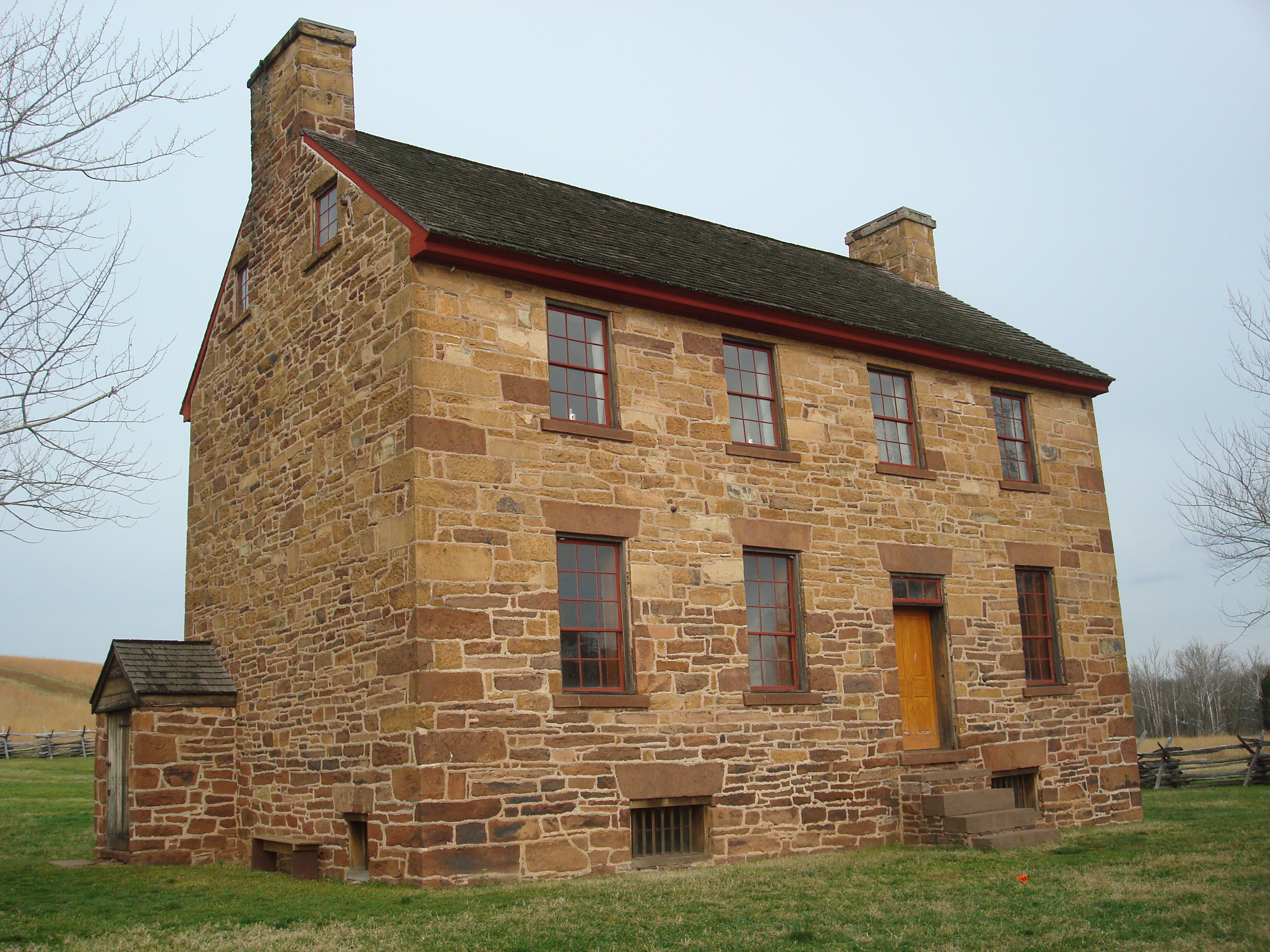
- Location: Sudley, Virginia
- Coordinates: 38°49′08″N 77°31′34.05″W
- Built: c.1828
- Part of: Manassas National Battlefield Park (ID66000039)

The Stone House, Manassas National Battlefield Park, is a two-story stone structure in Prince William County, Virginia. It was built as a stop on the Fauquier and Alexandria Turnpike in 1848. During the American Civil War, The Stone House served as a hospital during the First and Second Battles of Manassas.

Today the Stone House is owned by the National Park Service as a contributing property to the Manassas National Battlefield Park, which is listed on the National Register of Historic Places.

== Early years ==
The future Stone House tract was settled by European immigrants during the latter half of the 18th century. Wormeley Carter, of Virginia, received the tract from his father in 1801. By the time of Carter's death in 1805, he had sold off much of his land.

In 1808, the Fauquier and Alexandria Turnpike Company was formed to construct a 28-mile toll road from Fairfax Court House to Fauquier Court House, both in Virginia. This toll road would pass through the Stone House tract. The Company hoped the toll road would help Alexandria, Virginia, compete with Fredericksburg, Virginia, for trade with Fauquier Court House.

Six toll gates were located along the road at five mile intervals. Started in 1812, it would take 16 years for the road to reach Fauquier Court House, then known as Warrenton.

Wormeley Carter's son, Thomas Otway Carter, inherited the Stone House tract, but there is little indication he added anything to it. The first record of a structure on the tract appeared on an 1830 tax return after Thomas Carter had sold 148 acres of land and the house on it to John Lee in 1828. Although no physical descriptions of the Stone House as it appeared at this point exist, it is known that a woman named Mary "Polly" Clark operated a wagon stand at the toll gate there. Travelers who stopped at the Stone House would have been required to pay a toll, and likely also were able to receive food, drink, and possibly lodging.

In 1848, the Stone House tract was bequeathed to Thomas O. Clark, son of Polly Clark. Tax records in 1849 show a significant jump in the value of Clark's property to $500, suggesting the construction of a substantial house. This, coupled with an authoritative statement by Arthur Lee Henry identifying Thomas O. Carter as the builder of the Stone House, indicates the Stone House was built in 1848.

In 1850, the Clarke family sold the Stone House property to Henry P. Matthew, who intended to farm the land since its use as a toll road stop had diminished. For the next decade, the Matthew family lived there.

== First Battle of Manassas ==
During the Battle of First Manassas on July 21, 1861, Union commander Irvin McDowell planned to flank the Confederate position along Bull Run, which would bring the fighting extremely close to the vicinity of the Stone House. As the battle progressed, a Confederate force that had taken position on Matthews Hill, north of Stone House, was driven back by advancing Federals. The Union force that captured the Stone House area, though, quickly came under fire from Confederate artillery, and coupled with the fact that they were outnumbered by nearby Confederates, the Union troops had to fall back from the house. As the battle wore, on, however, the Stone House came under Union control once again.

Between 10 AM and 12 noon, ten Union and six Confederate regiments clashed in the vicinity of the Stone House. As a result, 1,054 men were wounded during those two hours of fighting. Although the battle eventually shifted away from the Stone House, surgeons and Northern soldiers soon began to seek refuge inside the house. Because the building had strong stone walls, a well in the yard, and was close to the main road back to the hospitals of Washington, D.C, it was an ideal site for a hospital.

The Stone House began to fill quickly with soldiers. One Union officer noted the muddy dirt floor of the cellar was covered with soldiers. Colonel John S. Slocum, wounded mortally as he led the 2nd Rhode Island Infantry, was carried to the house and treated by Surgeon James Harris of the 1st Rhode Island Infantry. Harris remained on duty at the Stone House after the retreat and was found there with 21 wounded Union soldiers. The next day, according to an informant, the scene at the Stone House remained a grisly one: "In this building were 32 wounded, many of them dreadfully mangled by cannon shot. There was but a single surgeon, and he was young and apparently inefficient. Men lay on the floor with their clotted wounds still undressed. Some had died and not been removed…".

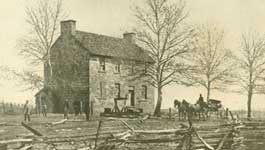
The Stone House in 1862.

Throughout the rest of the day, the Stone House was constantly under fire as the battle raged on nearby, with some projectiles entering the house and supposedly further wounding a few soldiers. Two flags were placed in the windows of the house to identify it as a hospital, but this did not slow down the fire that constantly peppered the structure. The well outside the Stone House served as a continuous comfort to soldiers on both sides as the fight wore on. As the Union line crumbled toward the end of the battle and the Northern Army found itself retreating from the area, the house came under Confederate control once again, and continued to serve as a hospital throughout the rest of the afternoon. After Confederate forces recaptured the house, they found a large number of wounded Union troops, some dead, and 36 men who surrendered as prisoners. Around 100 arms were also found in the house.

After the end of fighting, the Stone House continued to be a scene of continued activity. Since it was one of the few buildings on the battlefield located on a major road, it was a busy hospital. A traveler commented that the filth inside was so disgusting that he was not capable of staying long. Other visitors to the building noted there were men who had still not been attended to even many days after the battle ended. Eventually, the wounded inside the Stone House were likely taken to Richmond, Virginia as prisoners of war. Confederate forces continued to occupy the house until March 1862. It is not known whether Henry Matthews and his wife returned to their home before it was involved in battle again.

== Second Battle of Manassas ==
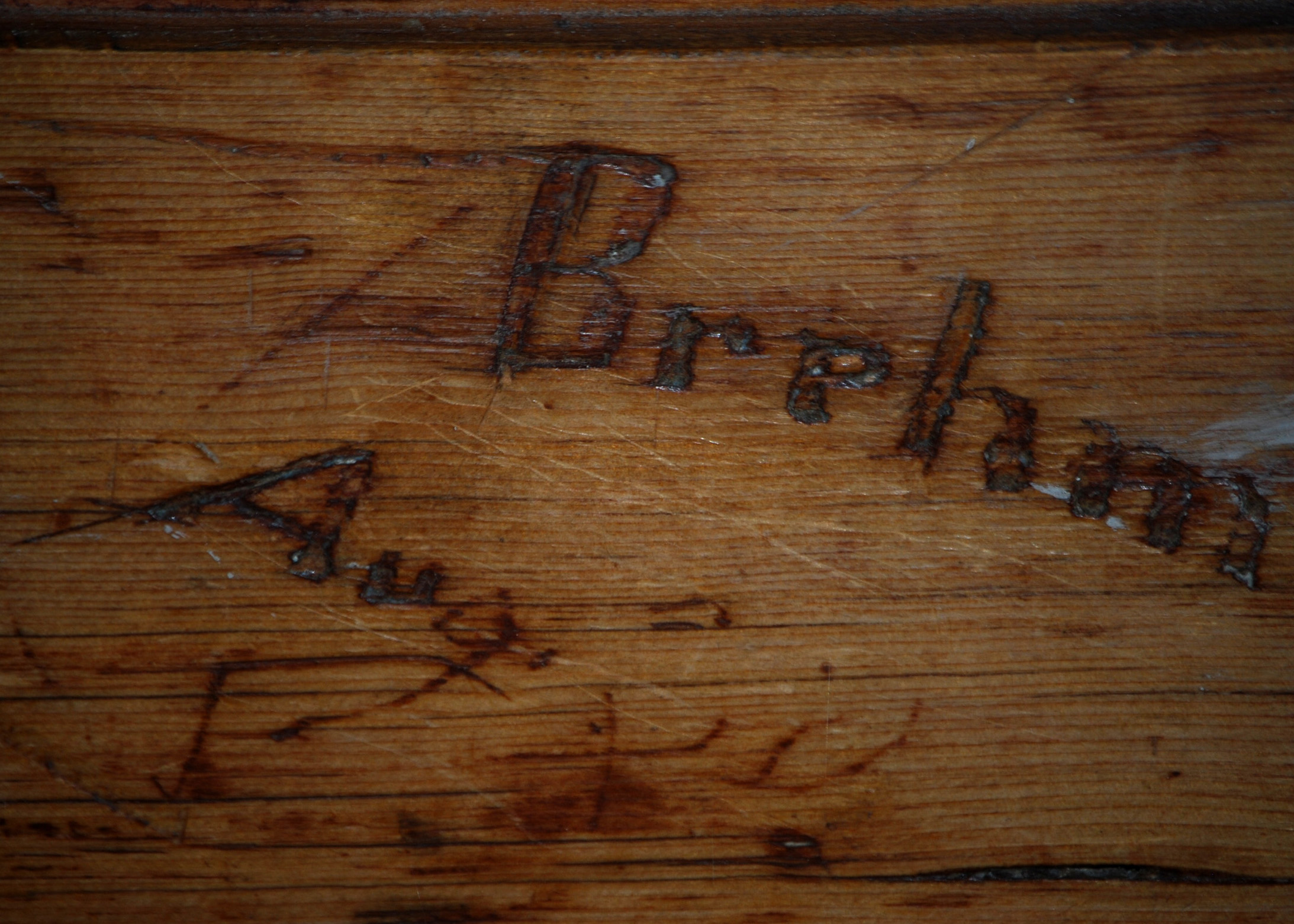
Carving by Private Charles E. Brehm, carved into the floor of an upper room of the Stone House after the Battle of Second Manassas.

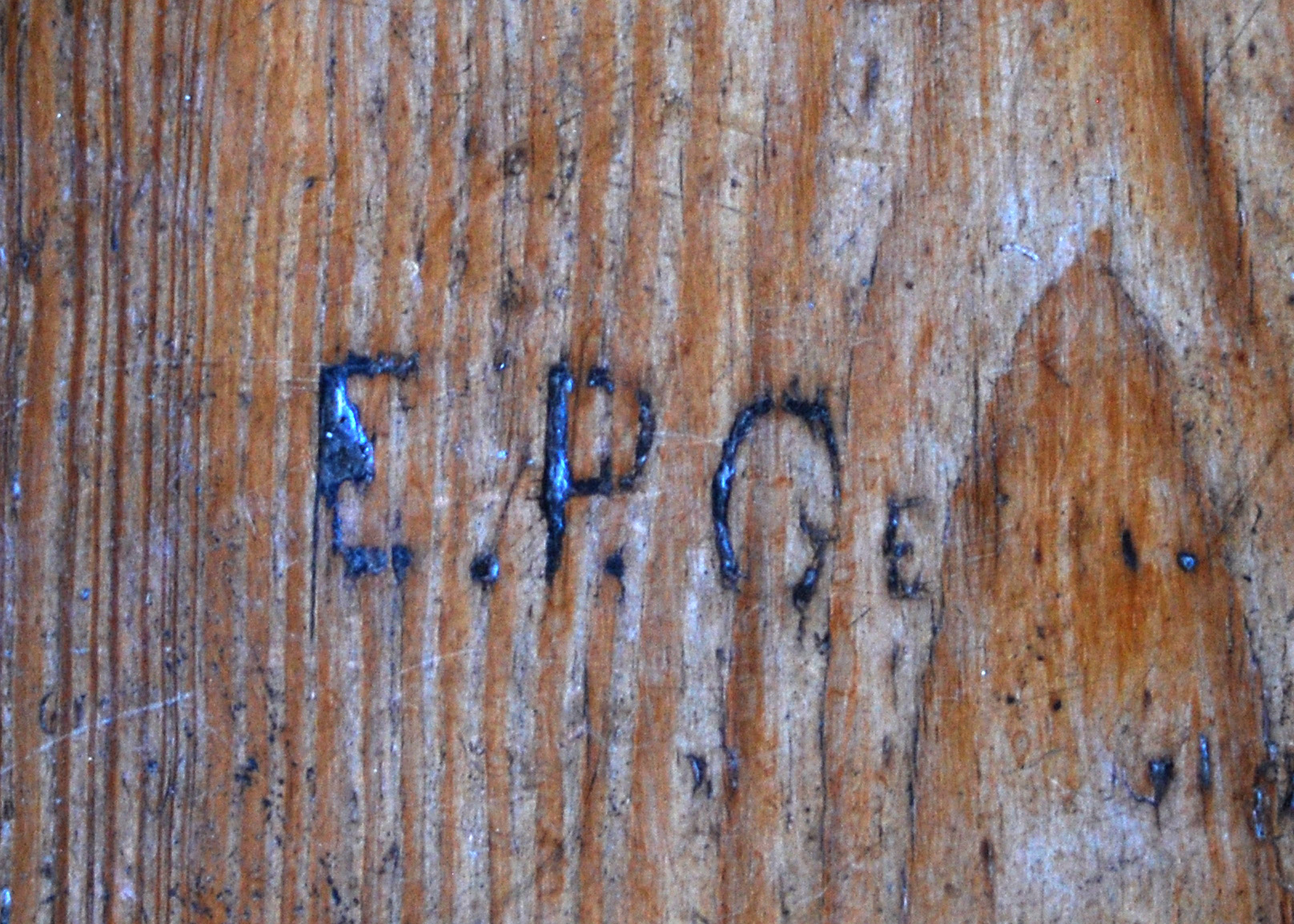
Carving by Private Eugene P. Geer.

In the days leading up to the Second Battle of Manassas between August 28 and 30, 1862, passing troops would have seen the house as they took their positions on the old and new battlefield. On the 30th of August, Union General Pope, with his army of about 65,000, was massed in the area of the Stone House and the Dogan House. Once the fighting began, the Stone House was quickly converted to a hospital once again. As one unit charged past the Stone House toward Matthews Hill, they found many wounded and dead, as well as thirty-six men who had sought safety behind the massive stone walls. Federal surgeons marked the building with a flag and treated the wounded throughout the first day of the battle.

On the second day of battle the Stone House continued to serve as a hospital. Some Union troops also buried their men in the yard of the Stone House. Two members of the 5th New York Volunteer Infantry, Privates Charles E. Brehm, age 21, and Eugene P. Geer, age 17, arrived at the Stone House after being wounded late in the battle, and were taken to an upstairs room. At some point during their stay, both men carved their names into the floorboards of the room they were in. Brehm's carving appears as "Brehm Aug 30", and Geer, unable to complete his last name, left the carving "E.P. Ge." Brehm survived the war and lived until 1909; Geer did not live to see the end of 1862. The carvings can still be seen to this day.

Like the previous battle, the Stone House was under Confederate control at the battle's conclusion, but unlike the previous year, the captured Union troops in the house were not taken prisoner, but instead paroled. Many of the other Union prisoners on various parts of the battlefield were also taken to the Stone house to be paroled. Five days after the battle began, on September 2, the last ambulance left the Stone House, and the building had seen its last action of the war.

== After the Civil War ==
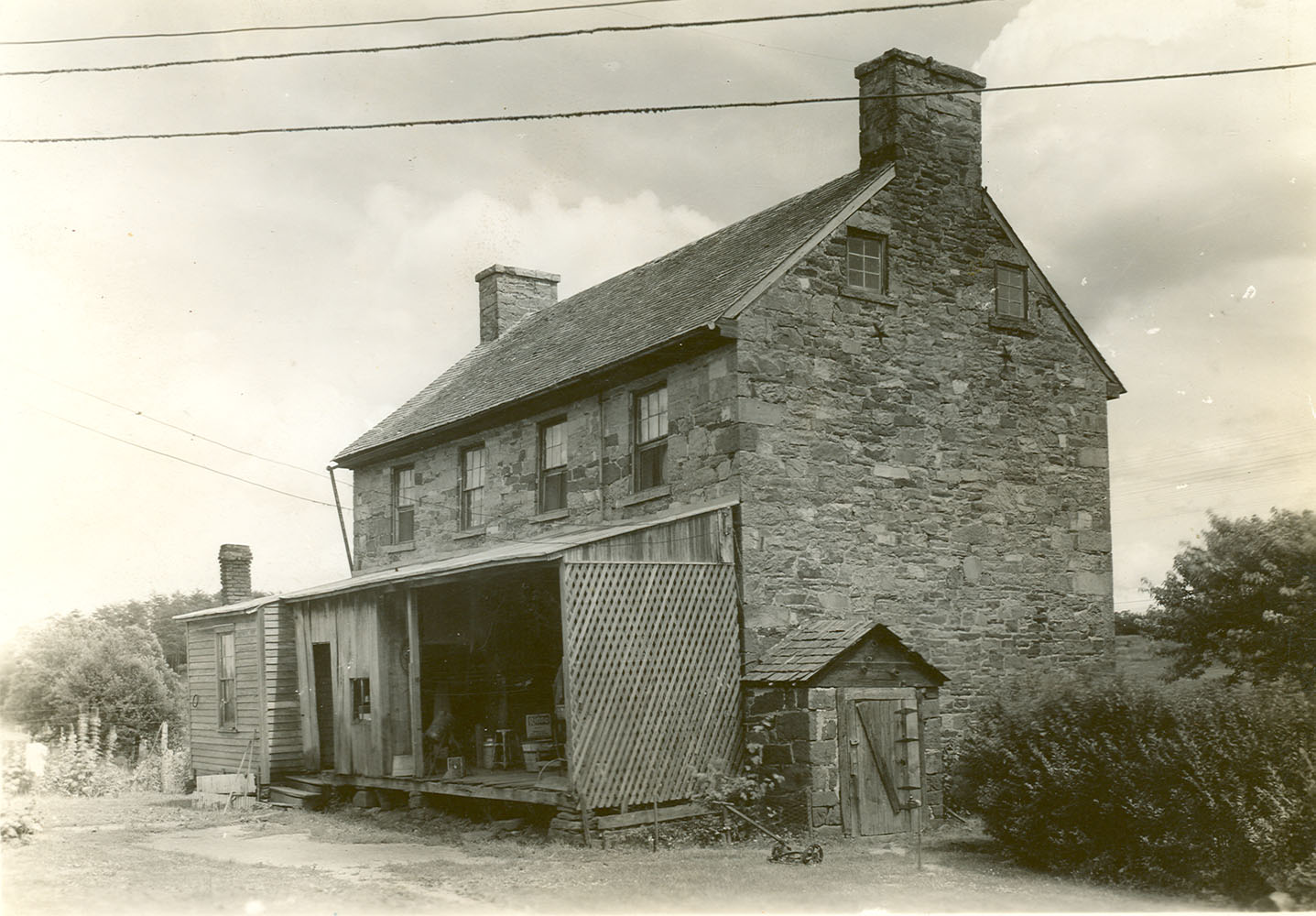
The Stone House as it appeared in the early twentieth century.

It is unsure when the Matthews family returned to their home after the Civil War. In October 1865, it and the adjacent land were sold to Mary Starbuck. After the Civil War, the tolls from the travelling public provided revenue for its maintenance and the profits of its owners. In 1879 the land was deeded to George Starbuck and his wife Meribah. Two years later the house was sold to Benson Pridemore. The Pridemores partitioned some upper rooms to make room for their children. This was the first major structural change made to the Stone House. Pridemore also added a front porch, a picket fence, and a barn to the property.

In 1902, following Pridemore's death, the property was sold to Henry J. Ayers. In 1904 Ayers added a kitchen and a large back porch to the house. Following Ayers' death in 1912, the house passed to his son, George. Photographic evidence indicates that artillery shells were put into the exterior walls sometime after 1912. Presumably, the artillery shells were placed where the masonry had been damaged during the Civil War. It is likely that George Ayers placed the projectiles in the house.

In 1949, the Stone House was sold to the United States Government. Two major renovation projects took place since then, including re-roofing the structure and installing new electrical and plumbing systems.

== Present ==
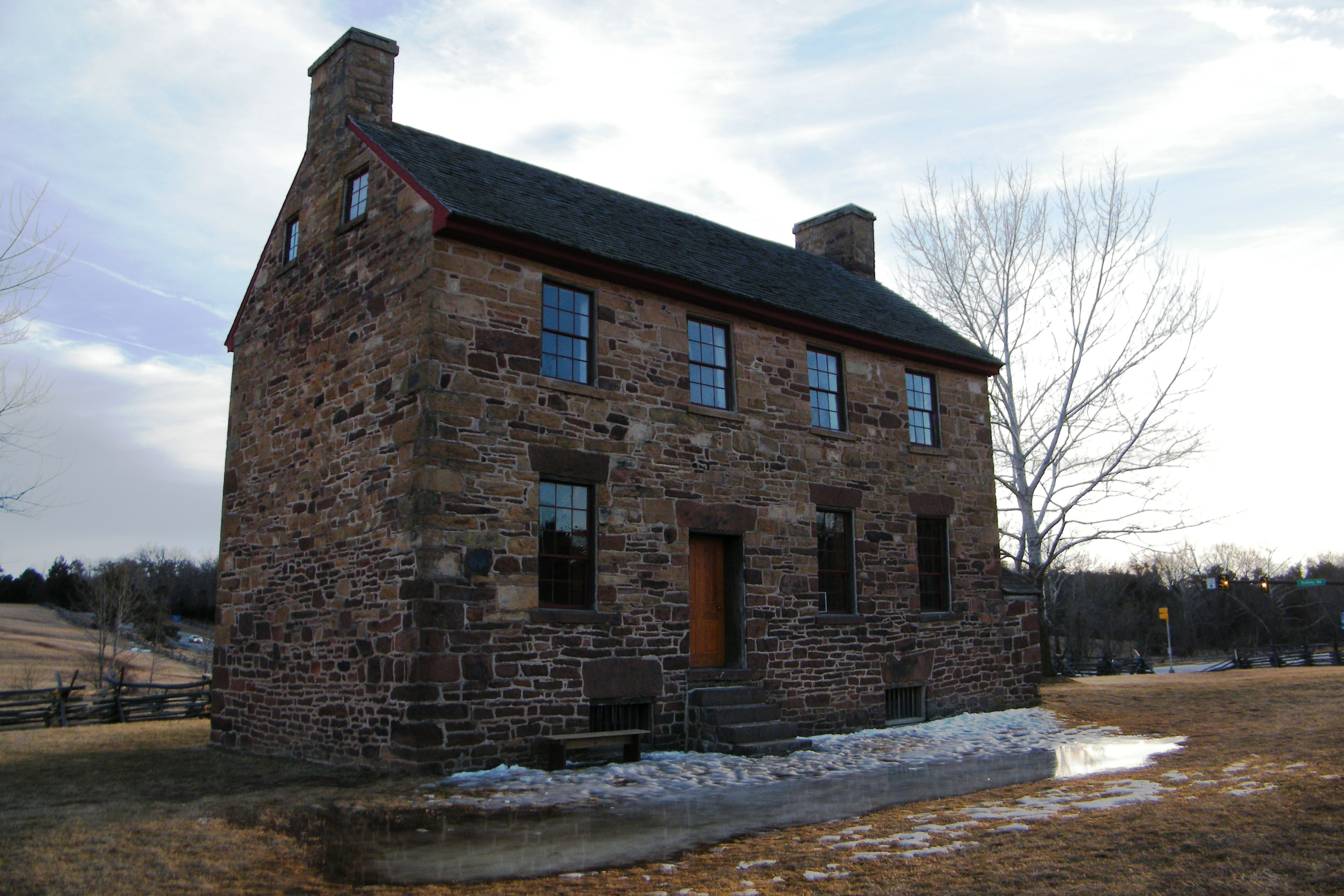
The back of the house

Although the Stone House is unoccupied today, various tours and interpretive programs take place there as a part of Manassas National Battlefield Park.
