= Orange and Alexandria Railroad Hooff's Run Bridge =

- U.S. National Register of Historic Places
- Virginia Landmarks Register
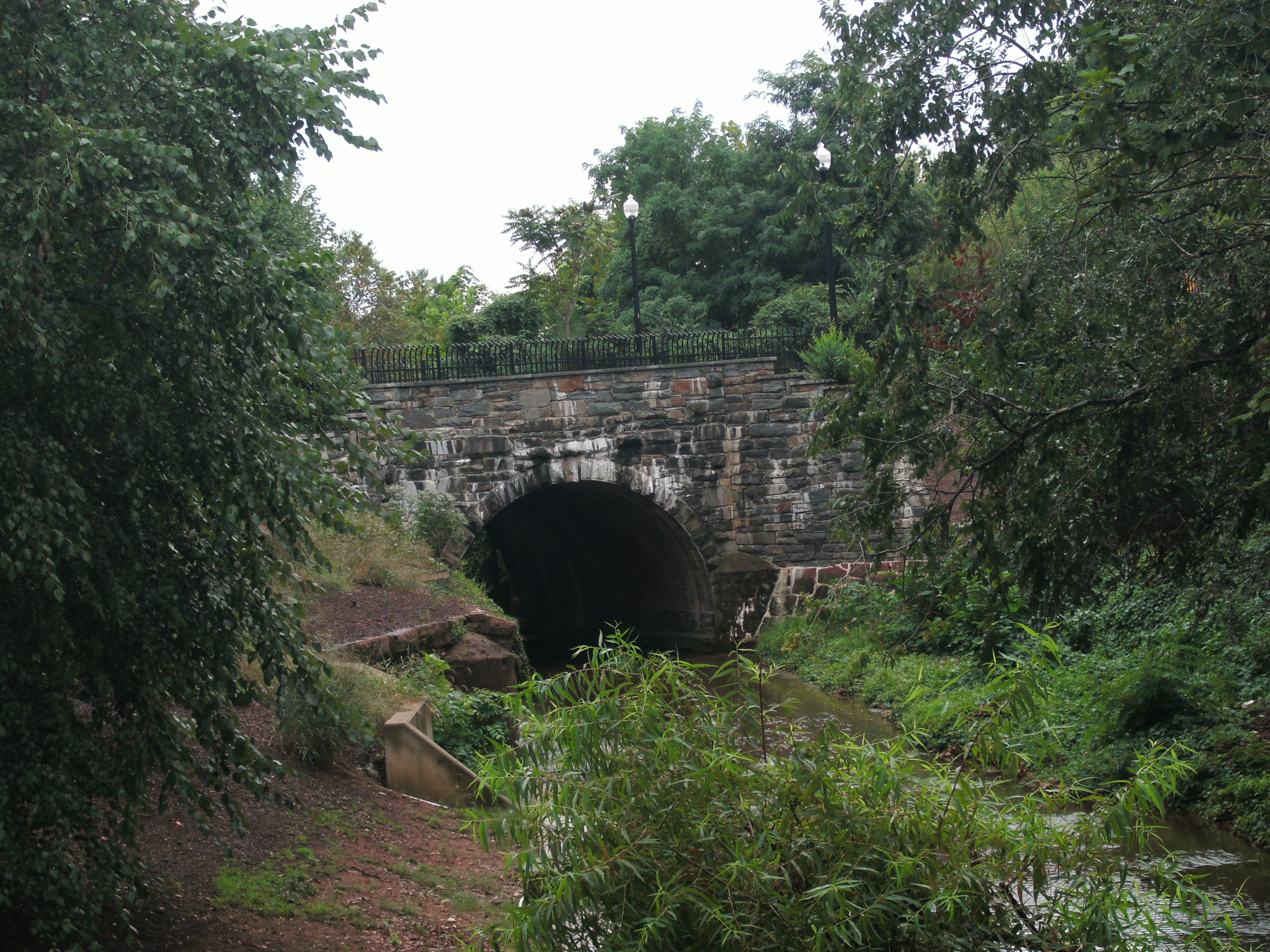
- Orange and Alexandria Railroad Hooff's Run Bridge

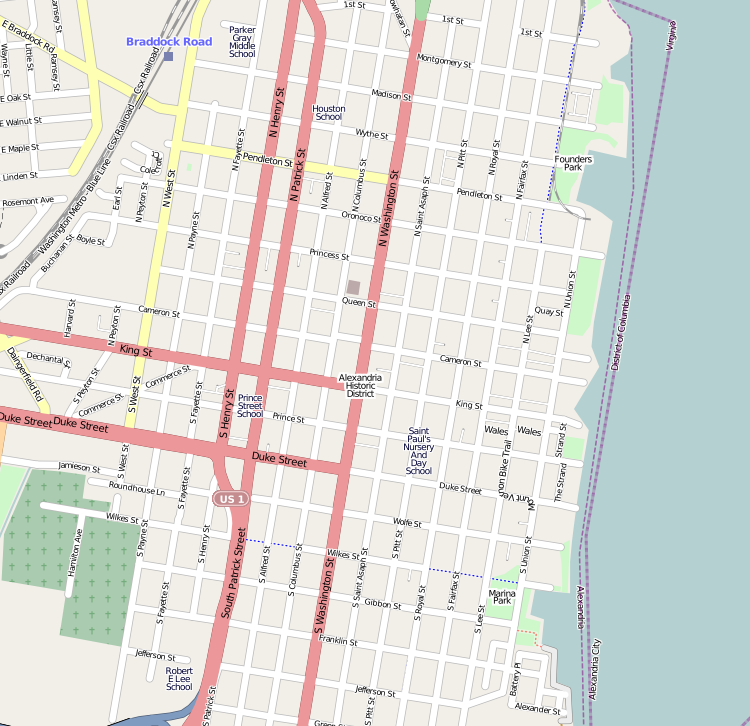
- Location within Alexandria Historical District Location within Virginia Location within the United States
- Location: Jamieson Ave. at Hooff's Run, Alexandria, Virginia
- Coordinates: 38°48′10″N 77°3′32″W
- Area: less than one acre
- Built: 1856
- Architect: Atkinson, T.C.
- Architectural style: Stone arch railroad bridge
- NRHP reference No.: 03000740
- VLR No.: 100-0149

Significant dates
- Added to NRHP: August 07, 2003
- Designated VLR: September 11, 2002

The Orange and Alexandria Railroad Hooff's Run Bridge is a bridge in Alexandria, in the U.S. state of Virginia.

Built by the Orange and Alexandria Railroad, the bridge was listed on the U.S. National Register of Historic Places in 2003.

== See also ==
- List of bridges on the National Register of Historic Places in Virginia
