= Stone Bridge (Manassas) =

- U.S. Historic district – Contributing property
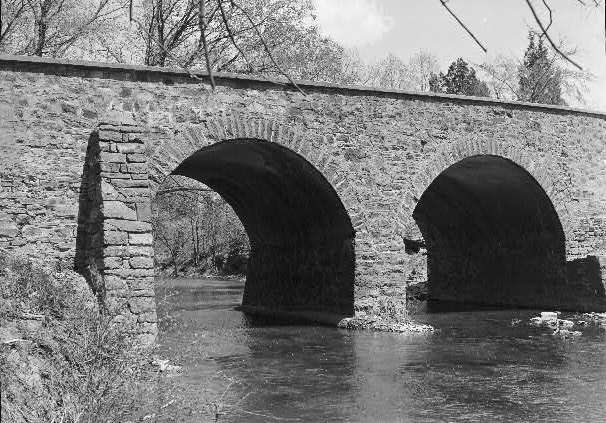
- April 1962 photograph of the late 19th-century bridge built at the location of the original bridge

- Location within Virginia Location within the United States
- Location: Across Bull Run near US 29
- Coordinates: 38°49′27″N 77°30′13″W
- Built: 1886
- Part of: Manassas National Battlefield Park (ID66000039)
- Designated CP: October 15, 1966

Stone Bridge crosses Bull Run at the eastern entrance of the Manassas National Battlefield Park in Prince William County, Virginia. The original bridge, built in 1825, was destroyed when Confederate forces evacuated Northern Virginia in March, 1862. In 1884, a new bridge, apparently similar to the original design, was built on the site of the old bridge. Modern day U.S. Route 29 crosses Bull Run on a bridge built in the late 1960s downstream of this one.

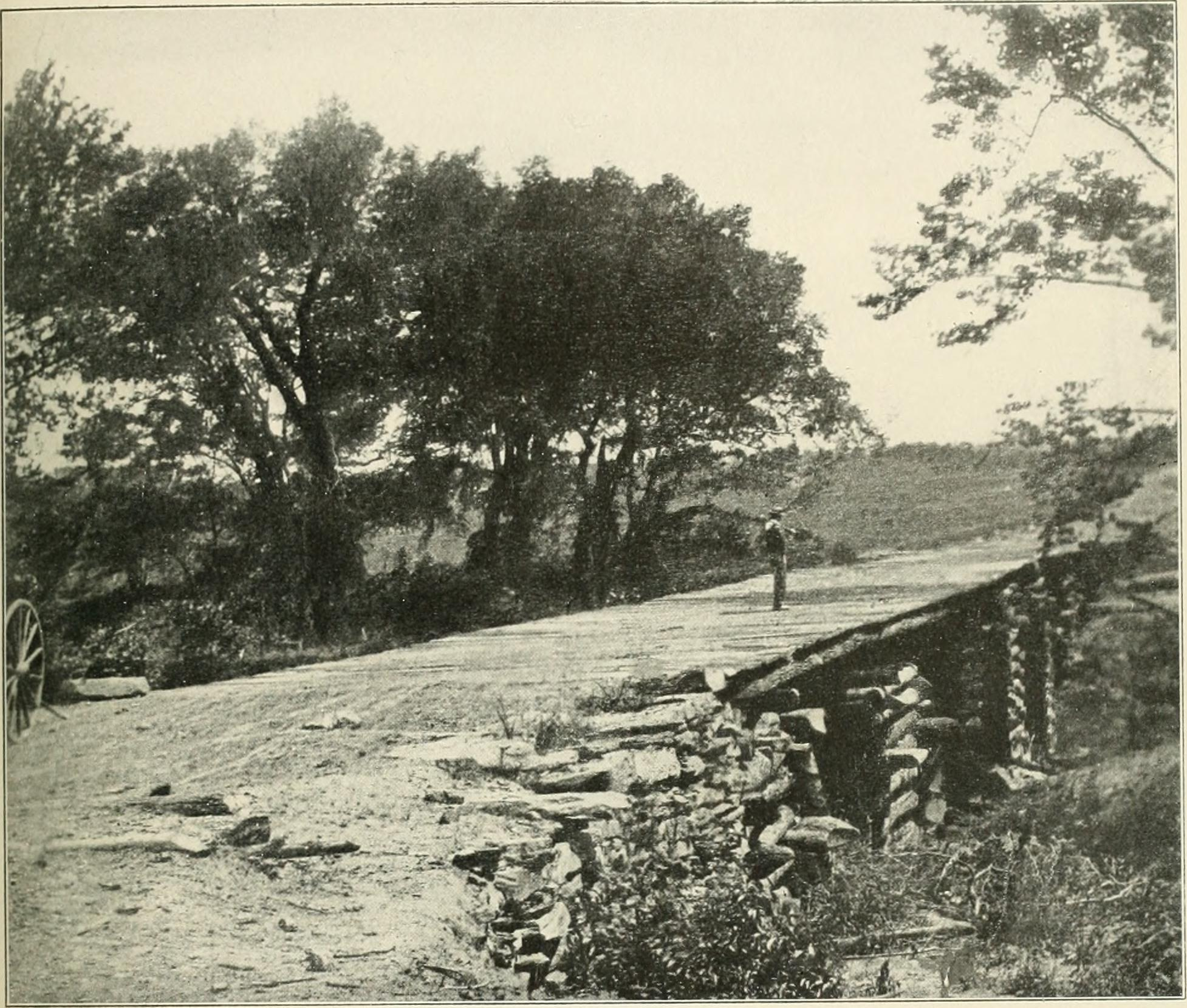
Bridge in operation

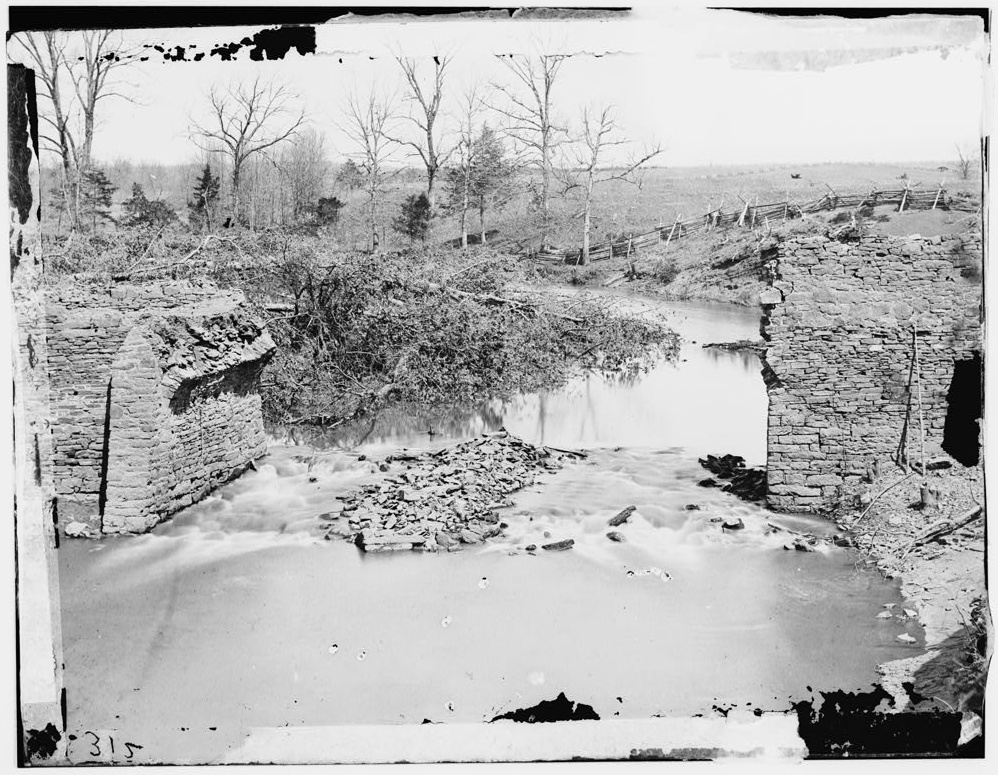
March 1862 photograph of the ruins of the Stone Bridge

== See also ==
- List of bridges documented by the Historic American Engineering Record in Virginia
