= Mansion Truss Bridge =

- Formerly listed on the U.S. National Register of Historic Places
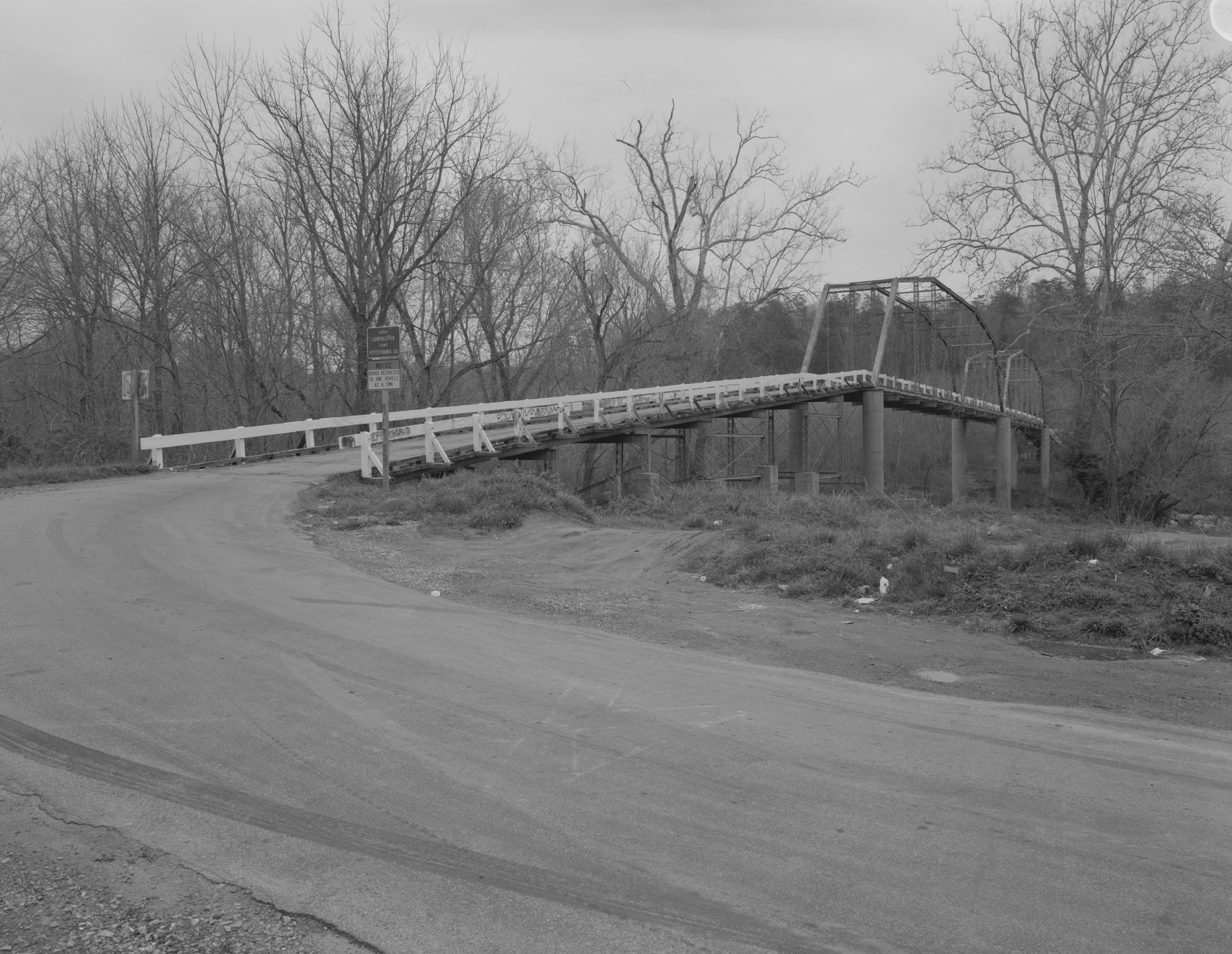
- Mansion Truss Bridge, HAER Photo, 1994

- Location within Virginia Location within the United States
- Location: VA 640 over Staunton River, near Mansion, Virginia
- Coordinates: 37°07′23″N 79°14′38″W
- Built: 1903
- Built by: Brackett Bridge Co.
- Architectural style: Camelback through truss
- NRHP reference No.: 78003011

Significant dates
- Added to NRHP: April 15, 1978
- Removed from NRHP: June 10, 2005

Mansion Truss Bridge was a historic Camelback through truss bridge located near Mansion (now Altavista) in Campbell County, Virginia. It was built in 1903, and consisted of two camelback through trusses. It was elevated high above the Staunton River and took its name from the 18th century mansion of early settler John Ward.

It was demolished in 1999. It was listed on the National Register of Historic Places in 1978, and delisted in 2005.

== See also ==
- List of bridges documented by the Historic American Engineering Record in Virginia
- List of bridges on the National Register of Historic Places in Virginia
