= Wolf Creek Bridge (Rocky Gap, Virginia) =

- U.S. National Register of Historic Places
- Virginia Landmarks Register
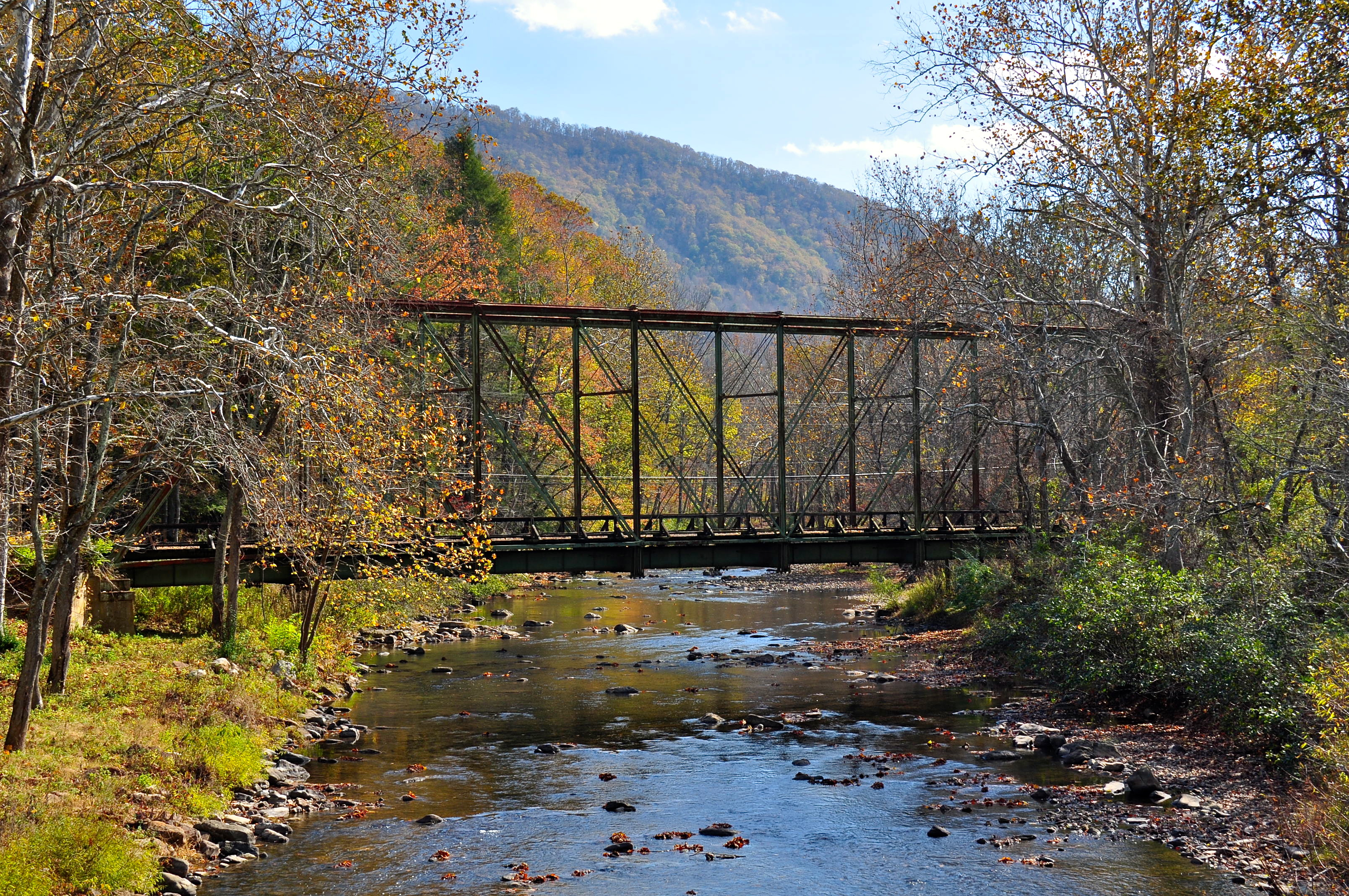
- Wolf Creek Bridge in October 2013

- Location within Virginia Location within the United States
- Location: Old SR 61 (Wolf Creek Road), near Rocky Gap, Virginia
- Coordinates: 37°14′37″N 81°06′09″W
- Area: less than one acre
- Built: c. 1912
- NRHP reference No.: 10001114
- VLR No.: 010-0072

Significant dates
- Added to NRHP: January 7, 2011
- Designated VLR: September 30, 2010

Wolf Creek Bridge is a historic metal Pratt truss railroad bridge located near Rocky Gap, Bland County, Virginia, United States. It was built about 1912, by the Phoenix Bridge Company of Phoenixville, Pennsylvania, for the New River, Holston and Western Railroad. It was converted for use as a road bridge in 1946. It measures 206 feet (63 m) long and 16 feet (4.9 m) wide. The bridge was closed in 1987 and became a pedestrian bridge and the focal point of a county recreational park.

The bridge was listed on the National Register of Historic Places in 2011.

== See also ==
- List of bridges on the National Register of Historic Places in Virginia
