= Middle River (Virginia) =

Coordinates: 38.27818°N 78.85419°W

Location
- Country: United States

Physical characteristics
- Source
  - location: Virginia

The Middle River is a 70.6-mile-long (113.6 km) river in the U.S. state of Virginia. Flowing entirely within Augusta County, the Middle River joins the North River, which in turn meets the South River at Port Republic to form the South Fork Shenandoah River.

== See also ==
- List of rivers of Virginia
