= Tipers, Virginia =

Unincorporated community in Virginia, US

Coordinates: 37°50′41″N 76°22′17″W

Tipers is an unincorporated community in Northumberland County, in the U.S. state of Virginia.
