= Manassas National Battlefield Park =

Battlefield in Virginia, USA

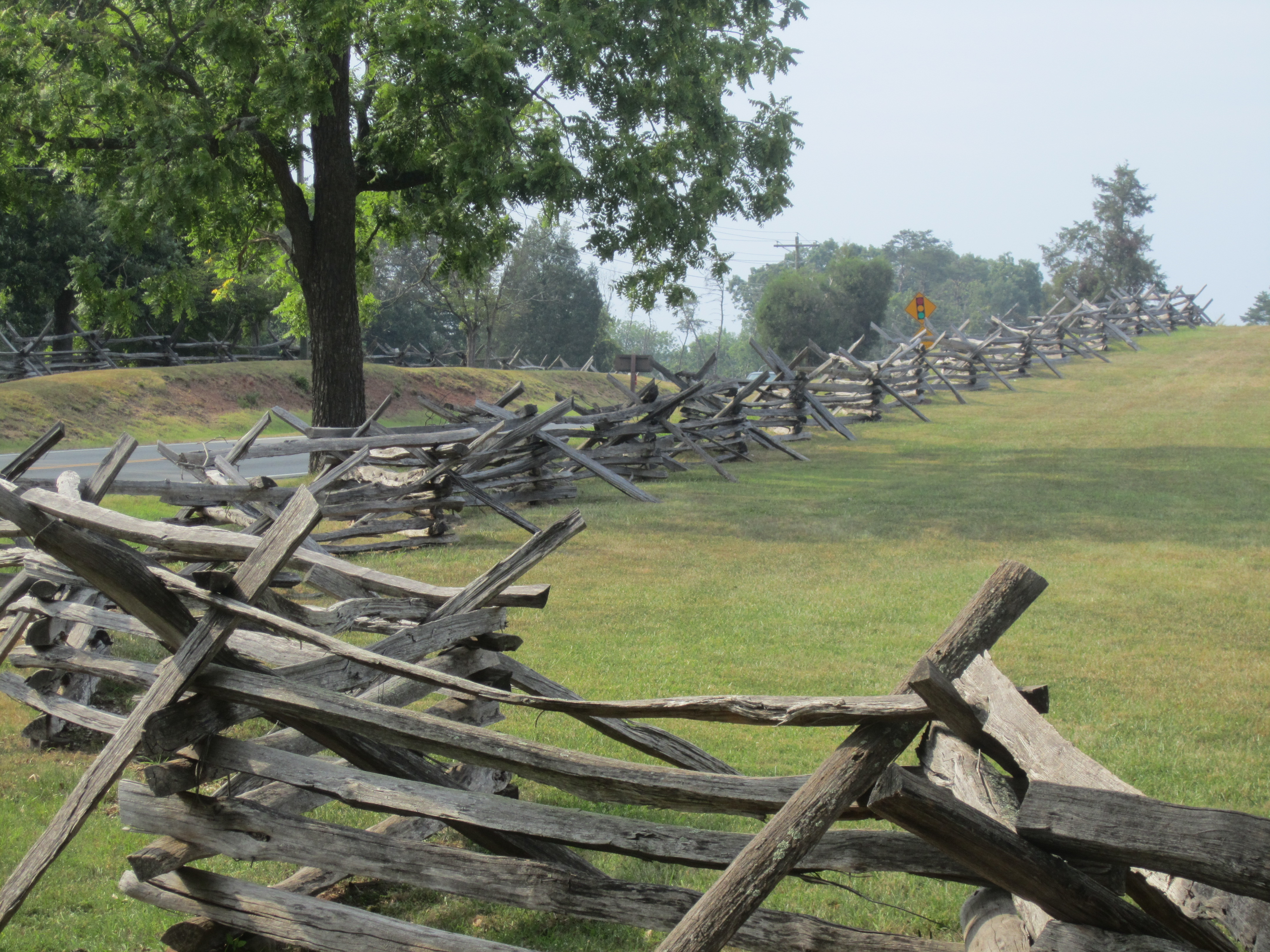
- Period fence at Manassas Battlefield

- Location within Virginia Location within the United States
- Location: Prince William County, Virginia, U.S.
- Nearest city: Gainesville, Virginia. U.S.
- Coordinates: 38°48′46″N 77°31′18″W
- Area: 5,073 acres (20.53 km^{2})
- Established: November 14, 1936
- Visitors: 473,482 (in 2025)
- Governing body: National Park Service
- Website: Manassas National Battlefield Park
- Manassas National Battlefield Park
- U.S. National Register of Historic Places
- U.S. Historic district
- U.S. National Battlefield Park
- NRHP reference No.: 66000039
- Added to NRHP: October 15, 1966

Manassas National Battlefield Park is a unit of the National Park Service located in Prince William County, Virginia, United States, north of Manassas. The park preserves the site of two major American Civil War battles: the First Battle of Bull Run, also called the Battle of First Manassas, and the Second Battle of Bull Run, or Battle of Second Manassas. This was where Confederate General Thomas J. Jackson acquired his nickname "Stonewall". The park was established in 1936 and listed on the National Register of Historic Places on October 15, 1966.

More than 700,000 people visit the battlefield each year. The Henry Hill Visitor Center, on Sudley Road by the south entrance to the park, offers exhibits and interpretation regarding the First Battle of Bull Run, including Civil War-era uniforms, weapons, field gear and an electronic battle map. The center offers the orientation film Manassas: End of Innocence, as well as a bookstore.

A find in 2014 unearthed bone fragments that led to the discovery of the skeletal remains of two Union soldiers in what is now thought to be a surgeon's pit. The remains were found among the bones of several other limbs in the pit. Carbon dating shows that the pair died during the Battle of Second Manassas, also known as Second Bull Run, in August 1862. The remains were moved on June 19, 2018, and transferred from the National Park Service to the US Army, which planned to bury them in Arlington National Cemetery.

== Historic sites ==
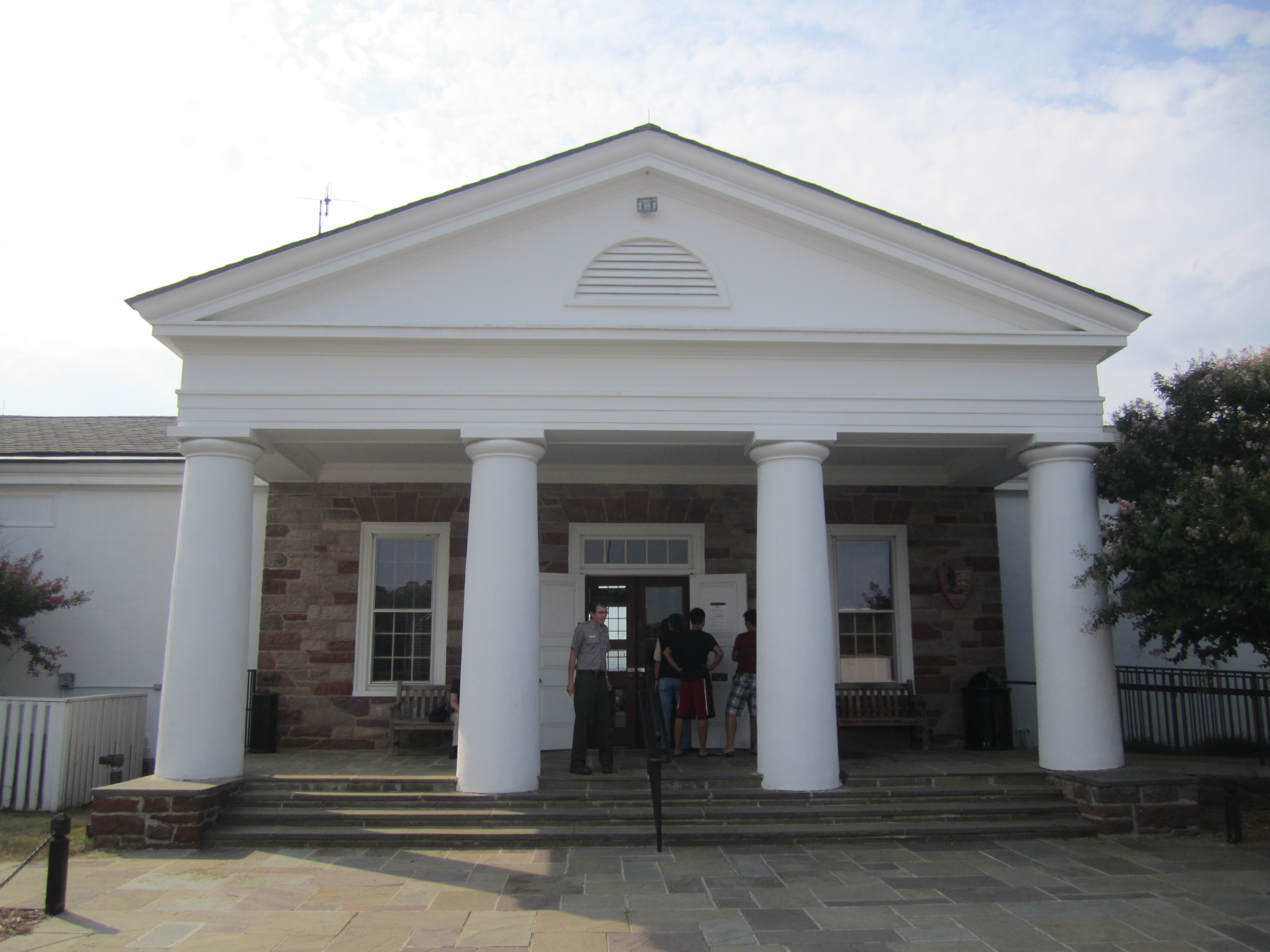
Visitor center entrance at Manassas Battlefield

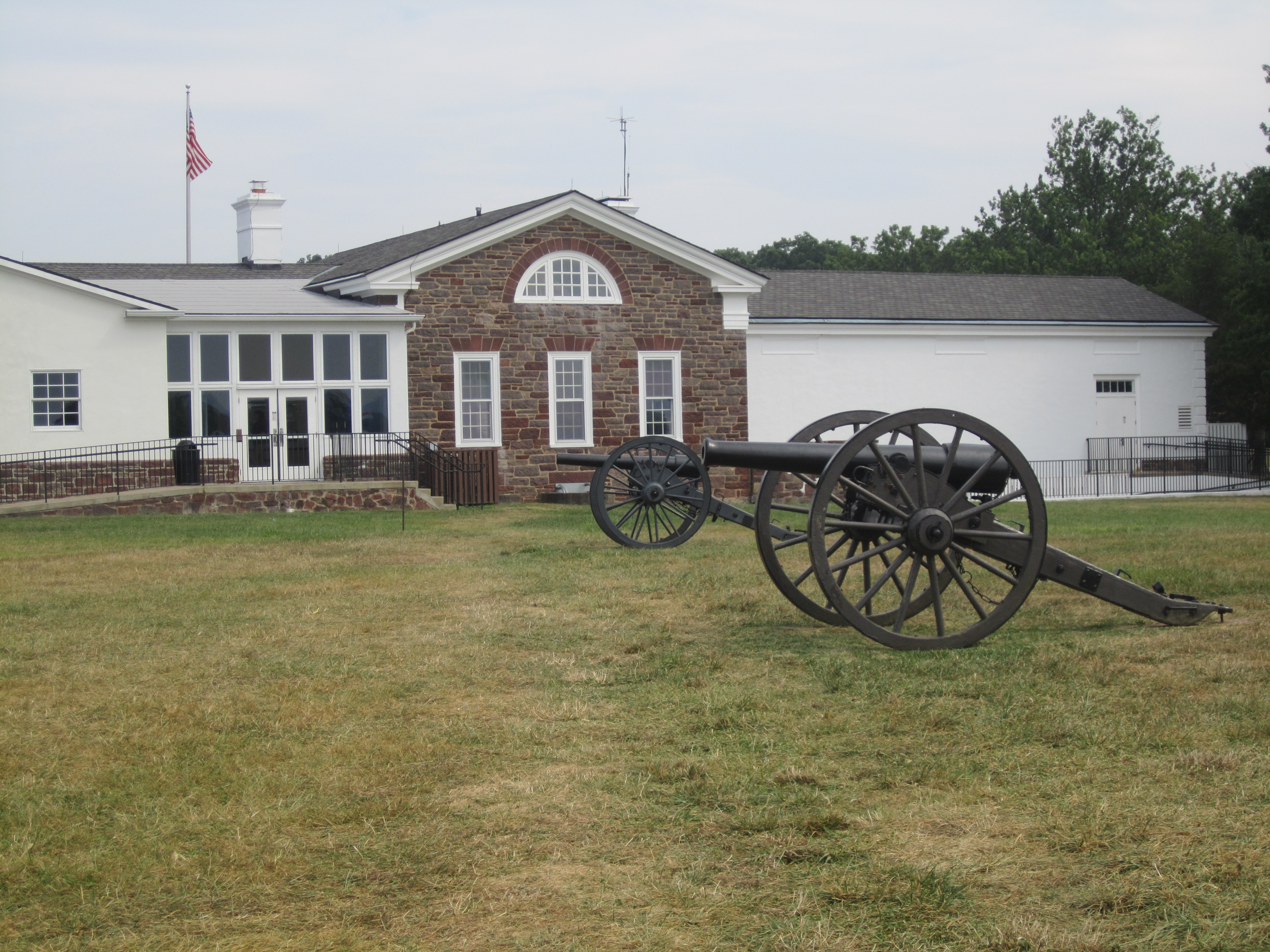
Cannon at Manassas Battlefield

- Stone House – used as a hospital during both battles. It is near the intersection of Sudley Road and Lee Highway (Warrenton Turnpike).
- Stone Bridge – which the Union retreated across after Second Bull Run. It crosses just north of Lee Highway (Warrenton Turnpike) at the Fairfax-Prince William Co. line.
- Brawner's Farm – the opening phase of the second battle. The parking lot is off Pageland Lane at the western edge of the battlefield. It has been renovated to become a museum dedicated to the Second Battle of Bull Run.
- Battery Heights – where Confederate batteries were deployed to fire on the attacking Union troops at nearby Brawner's Farm. It is off Lee Highway (Warrenton Turnpike).
- Matthews Hill – the opening phase of the first battle. It is off Sudley Road.
- The Unfinished Railroad Grade – where Jackson deployed his men before the second battle, after capturing Pope's supply depot. It is off Featherbed Lane.
- The Deep Cut – where Pope launched the bulk of his attacks against the Grade. It is off Featherbed Lane, before reaching the Railroad Grade.
- Groveton – an extinct Civil War-era village. All that remains is the small frame house that Lucinda Dogan lived in. A Confederate cemetery is nearby. Both are off Lee Highway (Warrenton Turnpike).
- New York Monuments – two monuments dedicated to the 5th and 10th New York Regiments. These mark where the 5th New York Zouaves lost 123 men in five minutes in the advance of Hood's men. It is off Lee Highway (Warrenton Turnpike), near Young's Branch on 5th New York Avenue, and across from the Confederate cemetery at Groveton.
- Hazel Plain – the plantation of the Chinn family. It now sits in ruins, and only the foundation remains. It is directly across from the Henry Hill Visitors Center.
- Chinn Ridge – across from Hazel Plain. General James Longstreet's massive counterattack during the second battle took place here. A trail leads to a boulder for Union Colonel Fletcher Webster, the son of the famous orator Daniel Webster, who was killed leading a failed attempt at repulsing the Confederate Counterattack.
- Portici – the plantation of Francis Lewis, now in ruins. This served as the Confederate Headquarters during the first battle, and minor skirmishes between companies occurred on the surrounding plains.
- Robinson House – now in ruins (lost to arson in 1993), was the home of free black man James Robinson. It is on the Henry Hill Loop Trail, accessible via walking only, not by car.
- Stonewall Jackson Monument – bronze monument erected on Henry Hill. This commemorates General Thomas J. Jackson and includes the origin of his moniker.

== See also ==
- Manassas Peace Jubilee (1911)
