= Spout Run =

Coordinates: 38.899647°N 77.088914°W

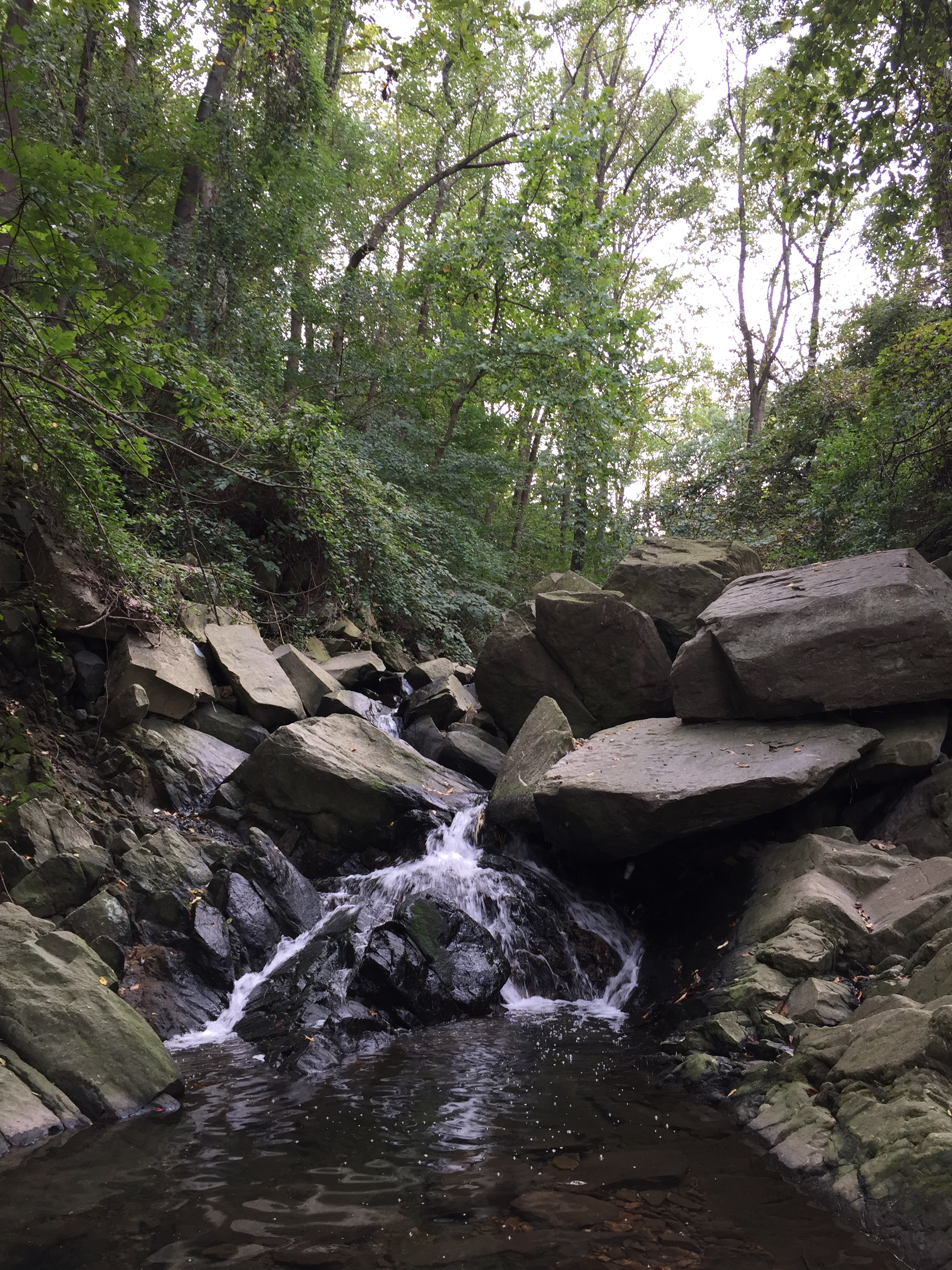

Location
- Country: United States
- State: Virginia
- County: Arlington County

Physical characteristics
- Mouth
  - location: Potomac River
  - elevation: 0 feet (0 m)

Spout Run is a small stream in Arlington County, Virginia. From its source along Interstate 66, Spout Run flows on a northeastern course paralleling the Spout Run Parkway through a gorge and empties into the Potomac River opposite the Three Sisters. With the exception of the adjacent parkway, Spout Run is surrounded predominantly by forests.

In the 1950s the second branch of Spout Run was culverted under Kirkwood Road. The source for this branch was near Washington Boulevard. Originally the branch was called Breckin's Branch, named for the Reverend James Breckin. Later it became known as Ball's Branch, for the descendants of Moses Ball.

== See also ==
- List of rivers of Virginia
