= Gulf Branch =

Coordinates: 38°54′58″N 77°7′57″W

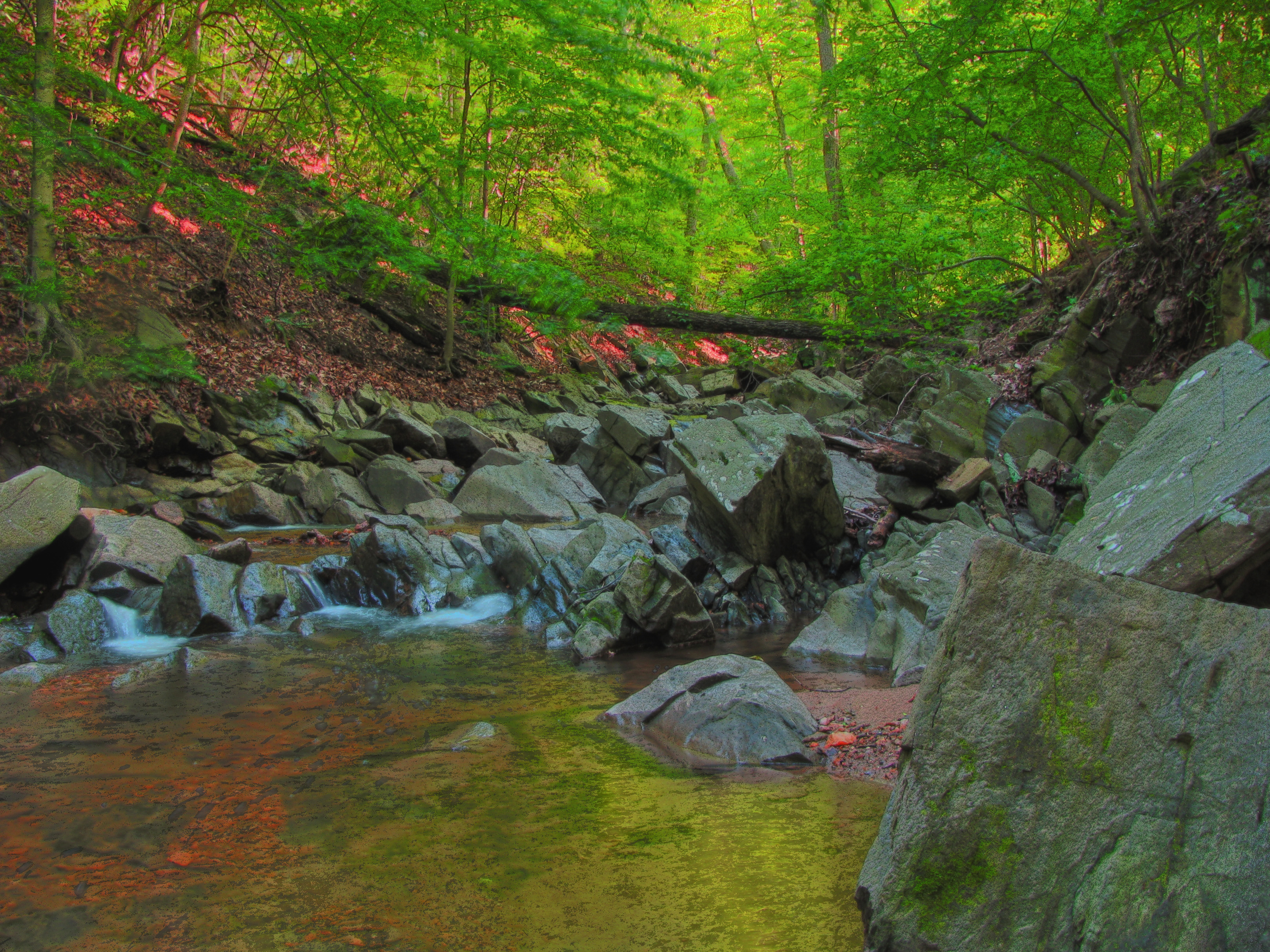

- Location of mouth

Location
- Country: United States
- State: Virginia
- County: Arlington County

Physical characteristics
- Mouth
  - location: Potomac River
  - elevation: 0 feet (0 m)

Gulf Branch is a stream in Arlington County, Virginia. From its source southwest of the Gulf Branch Nature Center, Gulf Branch flows on a northeastern course and empties into the Potomac River within the Federal parklands of the George Washington Memorial Parkway. Gulf Branch is surrounded predominantly by forests.

== Restoration efforts ==
In 2014, testing by Arlington County found that nearly half of Gulf Branch’s streambanks were actively eroding, so the county designated Gulf Branch a priority stream for restoration. A restoration project expected to take one year, began construction in early 2026.

== Parks ==
- Gulf Branch Natural Area, Arlington County Parks and Recreation
- George Washington Memorial Parkway, US National Park Service

== Attractions ==
- Gulf Branch Forge
- Robert Walker Log House
- Gulf Branch Pond
- Molly Ross Rising Relics, outdoor art display
- Gulf Branch Nature Center, features exhibits on local wildlife and local Native American history
- Potomac River Trail, parallel with the stream, begins across from the Gulf Branch Nature Center
- Potomac Palisades, includes a 30-foot drop in the stream just prior to its confluence with the Potomac
- Potomac Heritage Trail, perpendicular to the stream, crosses between the Palisades and the Potomac
- Gulf Branch Bouldering Area

== Roadway crossings ==
- Military Road
- George Washington Memorial Parkway

== Rock Climbing ==
A small climbing area with roughly 15 climbs is located at the mouth of the stream, where Gulf Branch feeds into the Potomac, near the Potomac Palisades

== See also ==
- List of rivers of Virginia
