= Mansion, Virginia =

Locality on the Staunton River

Coordinates: 37°6′48″N 79°14′43″W

Mansion
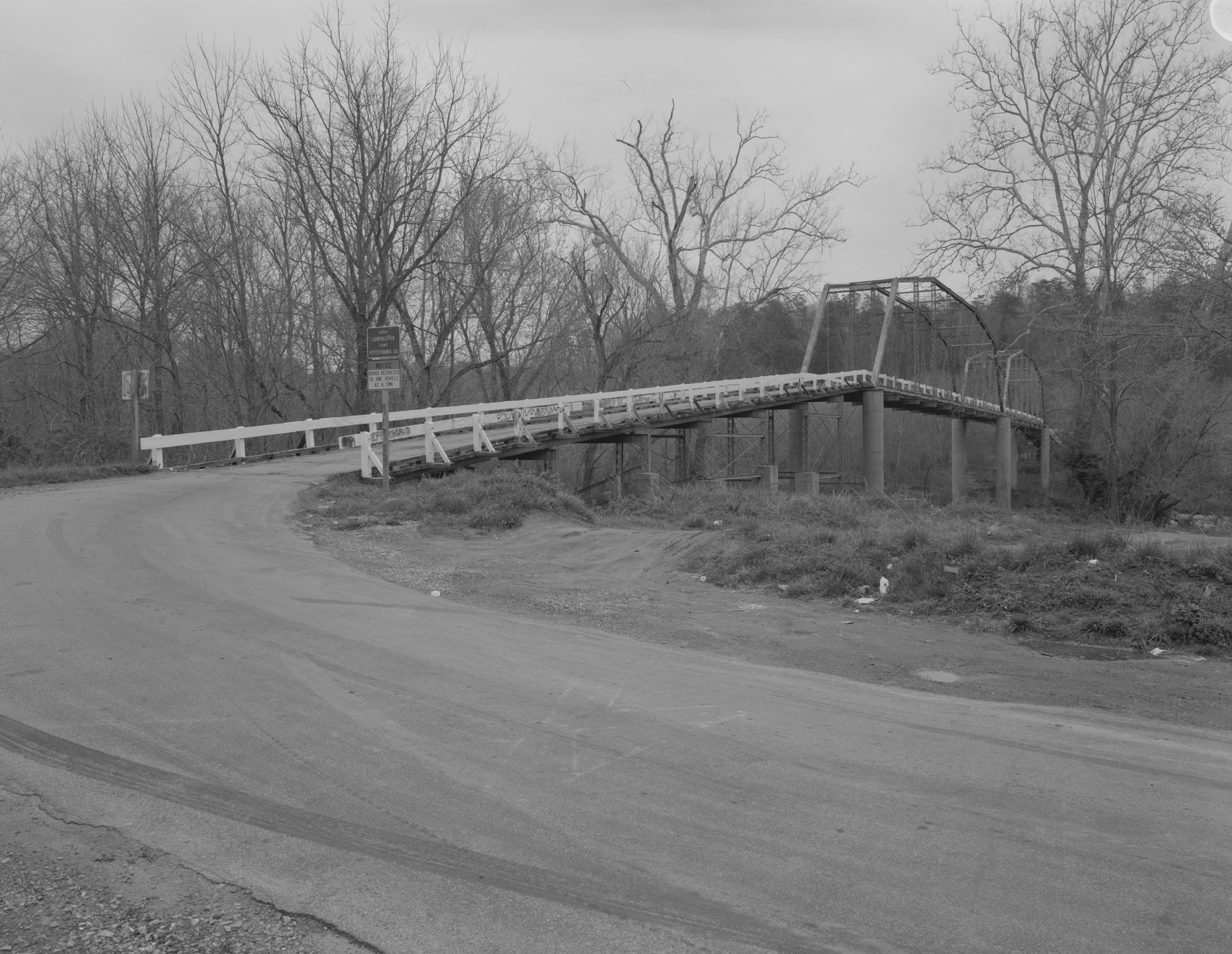
- Mansion Truss Bridge in 1994

Mansion is a locale on the banks of the Staunton River, between Campbell County and Pittsylvania County. It is located east of the mouth of the Otter River near Altavista, VA. The area was first settled by the Ward family in 1753, who built "The Mansion" in 1762, the namesake of the area. It was also the site of the Mansion Truss Bridge until 1999.

== History ==
=== Settlement and buildings ===
In 1753, John and Jeremiah Ward patented 3200 acres of land north of the Dan River and settled with Anne Chiles, daughter of Henry and Anne Harrelson-Chiles, along the Staunton River. In 1762, John Ward was granted a license to run a ferry across the river between his properties. Between 1762 and 1766 he built a home called "The Mansion" where he, Anne, his 6 children, and slave Tom would live; however Anne Chiles died before she could settle. By 1768, the Ward family owned around 20,000 acres along the Staunton River. On this land they built mills at Sinklers Creek and Chiles Creek, a second house in 1772, Ward's Ferry in 1778, (Note: Before Ward's Ferry was created, he previously ran a boat for passengers, probably referenced as the ferry he was licensed to run in 1762.) and in 1810 were granted a license to establish a toll bridge next to the ferry. (Note: This is probably Ward's Bridge which was burned before 1868.) The second house would become Ward's Tavern in 1805. The tavern had a kitchen, smokehouse, and carriage house. It earned the nickname "the Waldorf-Astoria of Pittsylvania County". John Ward died in 1816.

=== Ward's Road ===
Ward's Road is named for John Ward who surveyed the road. During the 18th century, it was called "the roaling road" because hogsheads of tobacco were rolled along it. In 1842, a turnpike called Stage Road was built between Danville and Lynchburg. The name comes from its use by a stagecoach for delivering passengers and mail. It crossed Ward's Bridge and continued onto Lynchburg through Ward's Road. Ward's Bridge was burned during the Civil War, and a ferry was built there again afterwards.

=== Locust Hill ===
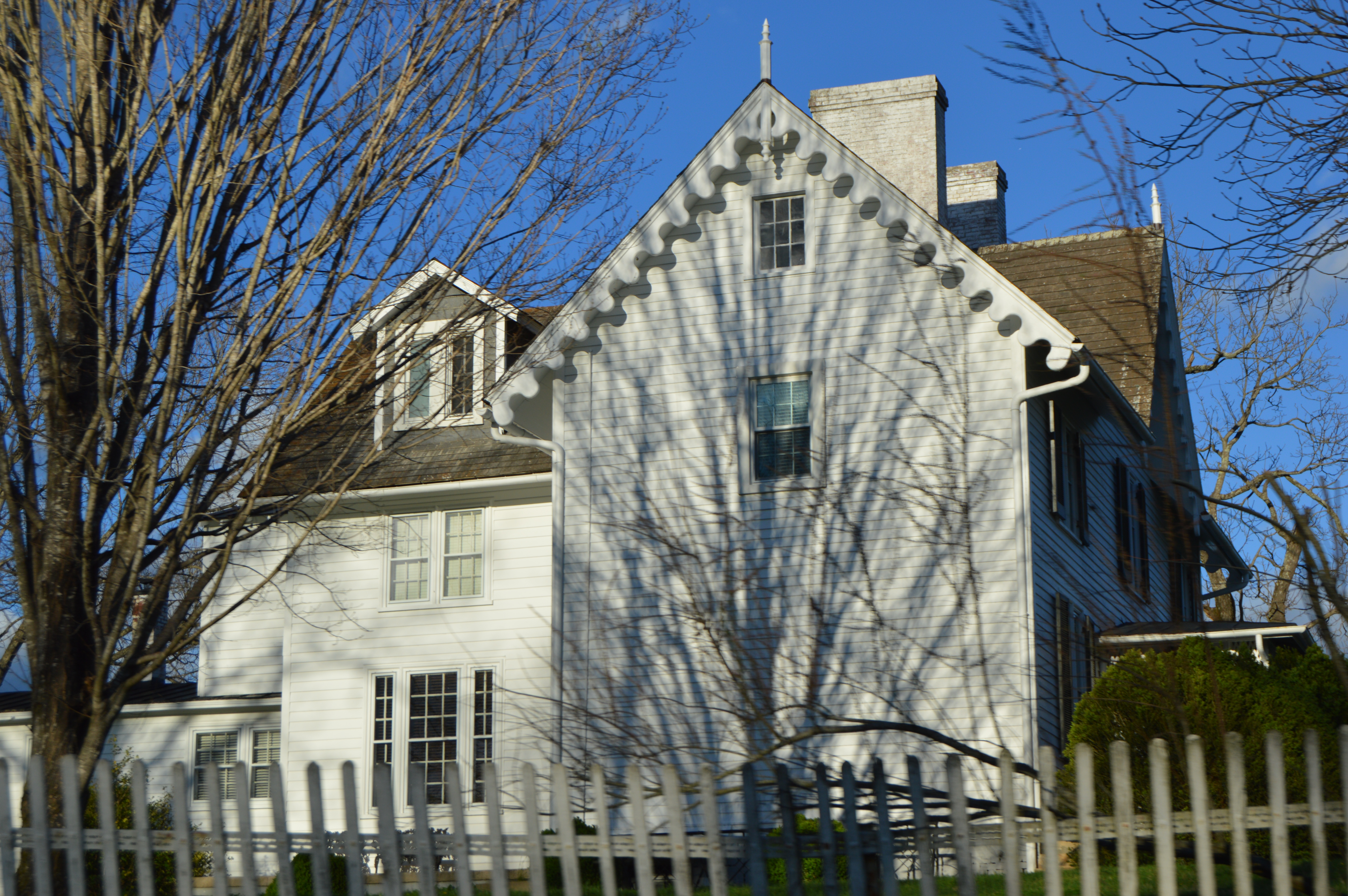
A view of Locust Hill from the side.

In 1849, Robert Ward sold the mill and tavern tract to Reverend James Hoskins Stone, who deeded this property to Samuel Marion Stone and his wife Bettie as a wedding gift. After the death of Bettie, Samuel began building Locust Hill in 1859 on the original site of Ward's Tavern. It was designed by Enoch Johnson and grew tobacco, corn, wheat, and oats, as well as raising pigs and sheep. The house was updated in 1929 by Fletcher and Elizabeth Perrow, who installed amenities like water and electricity. It was further improved by Fletcher Jr. who added a chicken coop, a caretaker's house, and a local water-powered electric plant which powered a workshop where he developed wax products until his death in 1992, when the property was inherited by Edgar J.T. Perrow.

=== Monteflora ===
Another mansion, Monteflora, was built by John Biddle Rutledge in the 1800s. This house was the Adams and Stone families' home; after The Mansion burnt down after 1899, the Ward family moved to Monteflora.

=== Mansion Truss Bridge ===
In 1903, the Brackett Bridge Company of Cincinnati, OH constructed the Mansion Truss Bridge over where the ferry was run. It was a Parker Truss bridge with cylindrical piers made of steel and concrete, and took between September and December 1903 to build and cost around $8,200 USD to build. It was demolished in 1999 and replaced with a modern bridge.

== Landmarks ==
- Locust Hill, a manor built in the 1860s
- Ward's Tavern
- Monteflora, another manor built in the area
