= Windy Run =

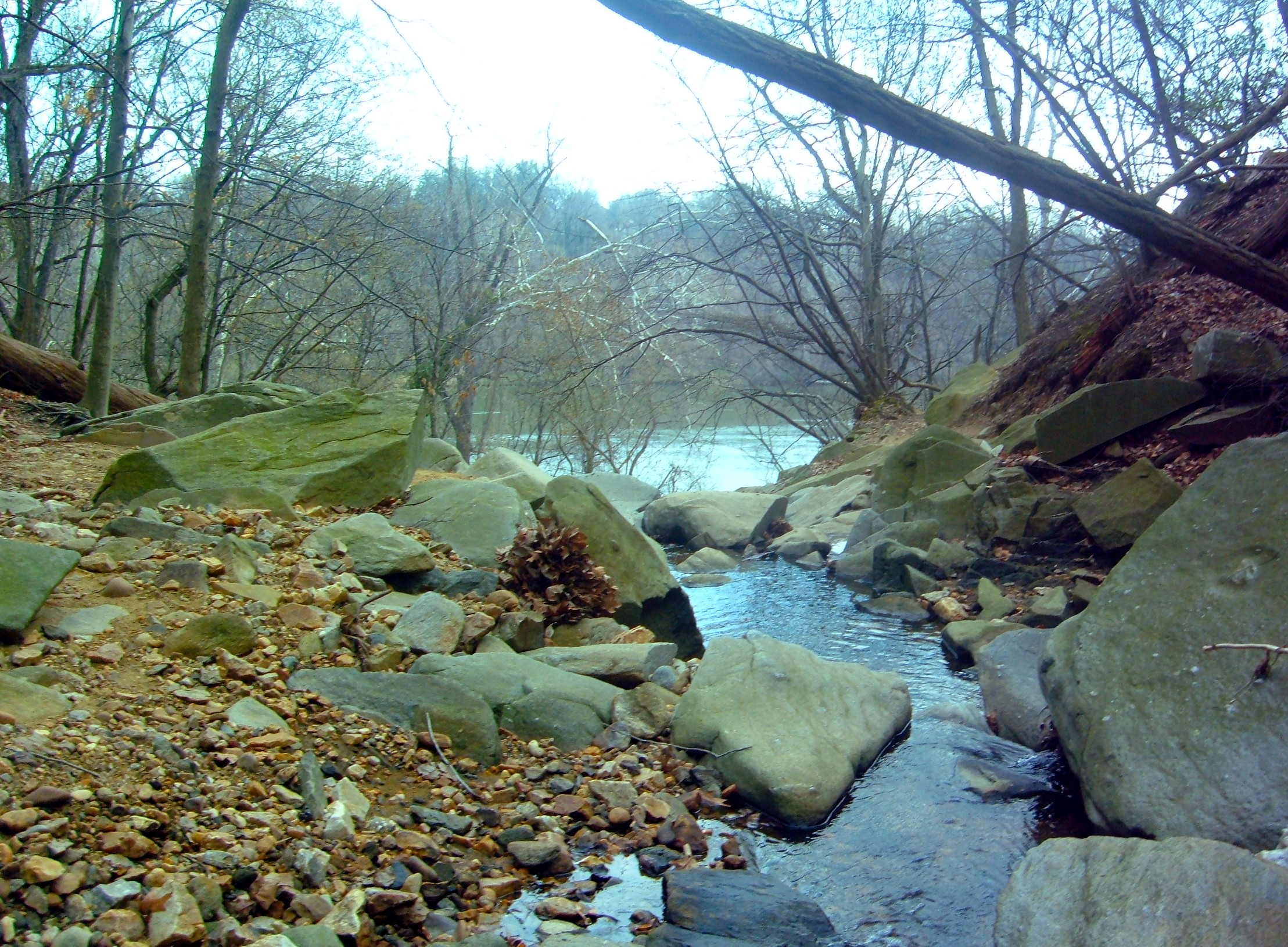
- Windy Run near its confluence with the Potomac

- Location of mouth

Location
- Country: United States
- State: Virginia
- County: Arlington County

Physical characteristics
- Mouth
  - location: Potomac River
  - elevation: 0 feet (0 m)

Windy Run is a small stream in Arlington County, Virginia. From its source near Lorcom Lane, Windy Run flows on a northeastern course and empties into the Potomac River within the Federal parklands of the George Washington Memorial Parkway. Windy Run is surrounded predominantly by forests. It is known by many of the Arlington locals as simply "The Falls".

== Parks along Windy Run ==
- Windy Run Park (Arlington County Parks and Recreation)
- George Washington Memorial Parkway (US National Park Service)

== See also ==
- List of rivers of Virginia
