= Ironto, Virginia =

Unincorporated community in Virginia, United States

- Unincorporated community
- Location within Shenandoah Valley Location within Virginia Location within the United States
- Coordinates: 37°13′07″N 80°16′41″W
- Country: United States
- State: Virginia
- County: Montgomery
- Elevation: 1,309 ft (399 m)
- Time zone: UTC-5 (Eastern (EST))
  - Summer (DST): UTC-4 (EDT)
- Area code: 540
- GNIS feature ID: 1468520

Ironto is an unincorporated community in Montgomery County, Virginia, United States. Ironto is located along a railroad 7.5 miles (12.1 km) east of Blacksburg.

Ironto has an interstate highway rest stop and is home to the oldest metal bridge in the Commonwealth of Virginia.
