= Blacksburg–Christiansburg–Radford metropolitan area =

Blacksburg–Christiansburg–Radford Metropolitan Statistical Area
- Metropolitan Statistical Area
- Blacksburg–Christiansburg–Radford, VA Metropolitan Statistical Area
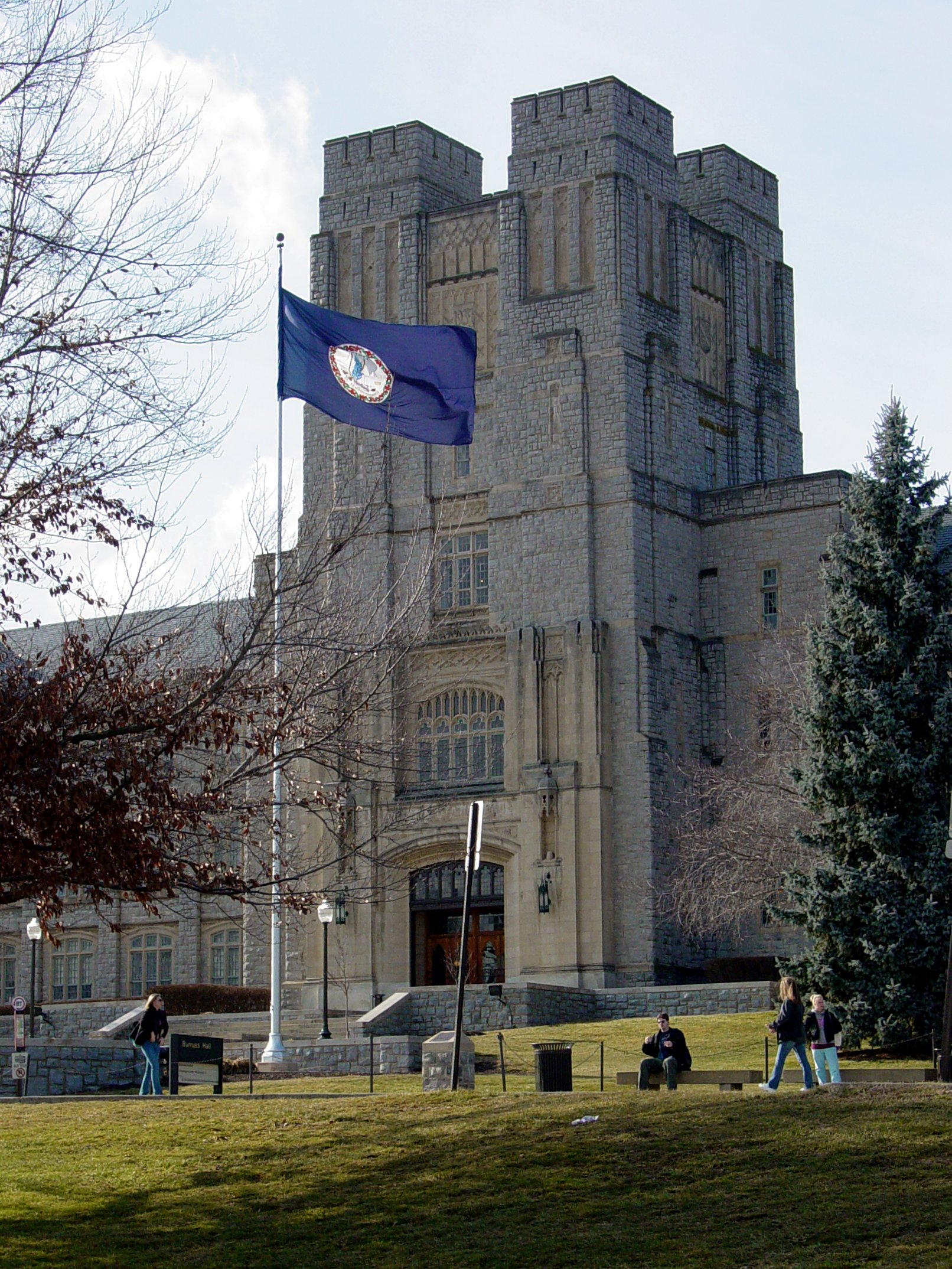
- Burruss Hall at Virginia Tech
Map of Blacksburg–Christiansburg–Radford Area
Blacksburg–Christiansburg–Radford MSA
Town of Blacksburg
Town of Christiansburg
City of Radford
- Country: United States
- State: Virginia
- Largest city: Blacksburg
- Other cities: Christiansburg; Radford
- Time zone: UTC-5 (EST)
  - Summer (DST): UTC-4 (EDT)

The Blacksburg–Christiansburg–Radford Metropolitan Statistical Area is a Metropolitan Statistical Area (MSA) as defined by the United States Office of Management and Budget (OMB) located in the New River Valley of Southwest Virginia. As of the 2020 census, the MSA had a population of 181,863 (a greater than 11.6 percent rise from the 2010 census population of 162,958).

The MSA is dominated by the presence of Virginia Tech and Radford University. The area, known as the New River Valley (or NRV), has experienced tremendous growth in the last twenty years and continues to be among the fastest growing areas in Virginia. It is bordered by the Allegheny Mountains to the North and the Blue Ridge Mountains to the South, with the New River flowing through the valley itself. The central communities in the area consist of two towns and one city; state law draws a sharp distinction between cities, which are completely separate from counties, and towns, which are contained within counties. Blacksburg, the larger of the towns, is home to Virginia Tech, while Radford, the only city in the group, is home to Radford University. Christiansburg, a town which lies between Blacksburg and Radford, is the Montgomery County county seat and home to a branch of the New River Community College as well as hundreds of stores and restaurants and a historic downtown.

== MSA components ==
Note: Since a state constitutional change in 1871, all cities in Virginia are independent cities that are not located in any county. The OMB considers these independent cities to be county-equivalents for the purpose of defining MSAs in Virginia.

Three counties and one independent city are included in the Blacksburg-Christiansburg Metropolitan Statistical Area.

- Counties
  - Giles
  - Montgomery
  - Pulaski
- Independent Cities
  - Radford

== Communities ==
=== Places with more than 35,000 inhabitants ===
- Blacksburg (Principal city)

=== Places with 10,000 to 30,000 inhabitants ===
- Christiansburg (Principal city)
- Radford (Principal city)

=== Places with 1,000 to 10,000 inhabitants ===
- Dublin
- Elliston-Lafayette (census-designated place)
- Fairlawn (census-designated place)
- Merrimac (census-designated place)
- Narrows
- Pearisburg
- Pembroke
- Pulaski
- Shawsville (census-designated place)

=== Places with fewer than 1,000 inhabitants ===
- Belview (census-designated place)
- Glen Lyn
- Rich Creek

=== Unincorporated places ===
- Alleghany Springs
- Bradshaw (partial)
- Childress
- Eggleston
- Ellett
- Goldbond
- Graysontown
- Hiwassee
- Hoges Chapel
- Ironto
- Kimballton
- Long Shop
- Lusters Gate
- Maybrook
- McCoy
- McDonalds Mill
- Newport
- New River
- Pilot
- Prices Fork
- Prospectdale
- Riner
- Ripplemead
- Rogers
- Staffordsville
- Sugar Grove
- Tom's Creek
- Vicker
- Walton
- White Gate
- Yellow Sulphur Springs

== Demographics ==
As of the census of 2000, there were 151,272 people, 58,443 households, and 34,881 families residing within the MSA. The racial makeup of the MSA was 91.24% White, 4.34% African American, 0.18% Native American, 2.44% Asian, 0.03% Pacific Islander, 0.50% from other races, and 1.28% from two or more races. Hispanics or Latinos of any race were 1.29% of the population.

The median income for a household in the MSA was $31,446, and the median income for a family was $44,478. Males had a median income of $32,377 versus $22,605 for females. The per capita income for the MSA was $17,184.

== See also ==
- List of U.S. Metropolitan Statistical Areas in Virginia
- Virginia census statistical areas
