= Linkous Store, Virginia =

Unincorporated community in Virginia, United States

- Unincorporated community
- Location within Virginia Location within the United States
- Coordinates: 37°12′55″N 80°28′8″W
- Country: United States
- State: Virginia
- County: Montgomery County

Linkous Store is a settlement near the town of Blacksburg in Montgomery County, Virginia, United States. It lies on the western edge of Blacksburg at the intersection of Prices Fork Road (SR 685) and Merrimac Road (SR 657) about 1.5 miles (2 km) from Prices Fork. The community is a part of the Blacksburg–Christiansburg Metropolitan Statistical Area which encompasses all of Montgomery County and the cities of Blacksburg, Christiansburg, and Radford for statistical purposes.

The settlement is named for a store (not extant) originally constructed in the mid 19th century and owned by the Linkous family. The town had a one-room school, Matamoras No. 9, located behind the site of St. Peter's Lutheran Church. A marker at the site of the church reads in part "Site of St. Peter's Evangelical Church, 1750-1885. St. Peter's was the first Church west of the Alleghanies and the third Lutheran Church in Virginia."
