= Virginia State Route 114 =

State highway in southwestern Virginia, US

State Route 114
- Peppers Ferry Road

Route information
- Maintained by VDOT
- Length: 10.32 mi (16.61 km)
- Existed: July 1, 1933–present

Major junctions
- West end: US 11 in Fairlawn
- East end: US 460 / SR 845 in Christiansburg

Location
- Country: United States
- State: Virginia
- Counties: Pulaski, Montgomery

Highway system
- Virginia Routes; Interstate; US; Primary; Secondary; Byways; History; HOT lanes
← SR 113	→ SR 115

State Route 114 is a primary state highway in the U.S. state of Virginia. Known as Peppers Ferry Road, the state highway runs 10.32 miles (16.61 km) from U.S. Route 11 (US 11) in Fairlawn east to US 460 in Christiansburg. SR 114 is the northernmost of three east–west highways between Radford and Christiansburg and the most direct highway between Radford and Blacksburg. The state highway also connects those cities with the Radford Army Ammunition Plant.

== Route description ==
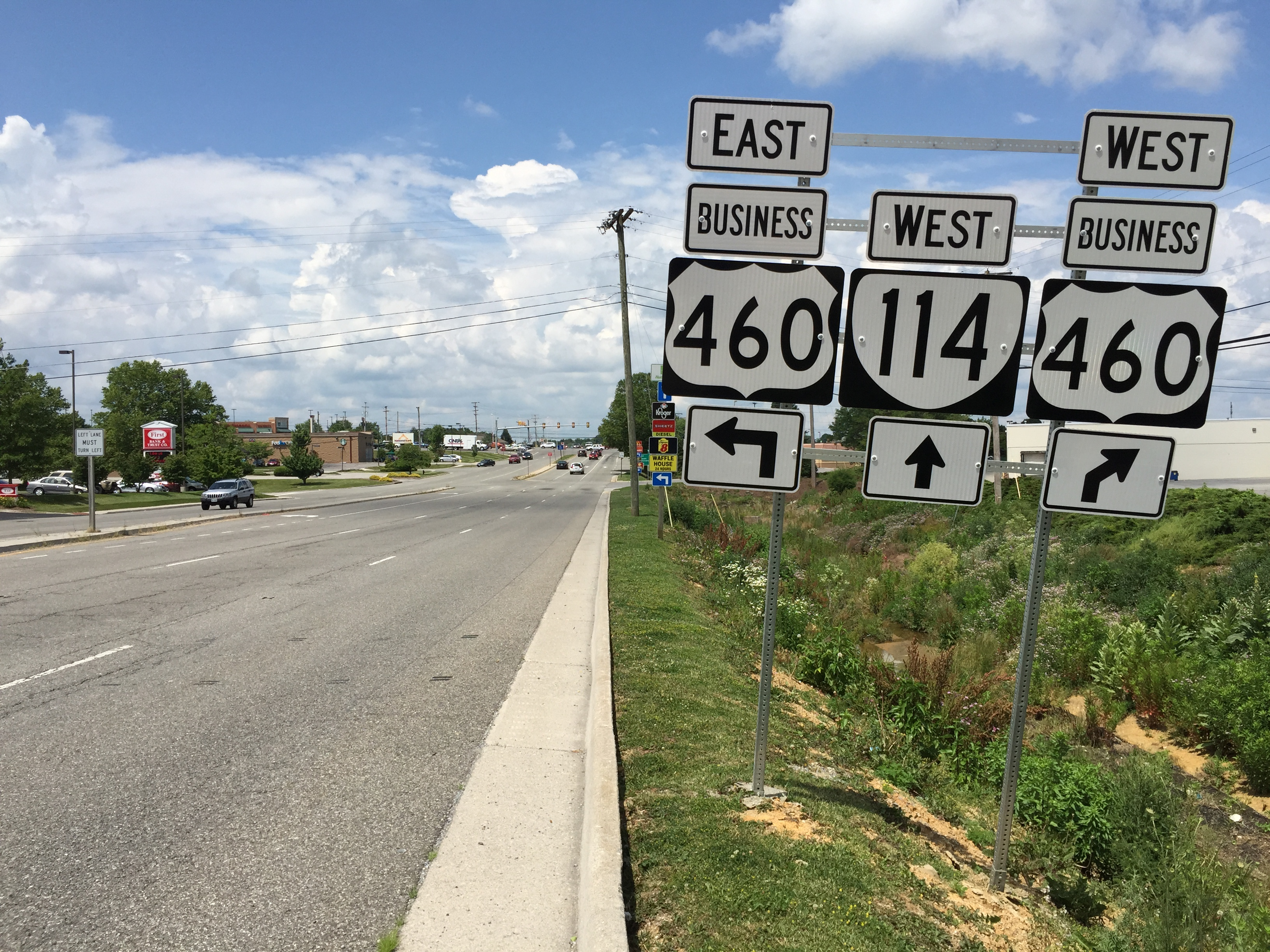
View west along SR 114 just east of US 460 Bus. in Christiansburg

SR 114 begins at an intersection with US 11 (Lee Highway) in Fairlawn, a community in Pulaski County located across the New River from the city of Radford. The state highway heads east as a five-lane road with a center left-turn lane through a commercial corridor. East of this area, SR 114 transitions into a four-lane divided highway for a short distance before the westbound lanes merge onto the eastbound carriageway.

The highway continues east as a two-lane, two-way road utilizing the southern of two carriageways; the northern carriageway remains unused. SR 114 maintains this configuration until it reaches the New River, where the two-lane road crosses a bridge closely paralleled by a defunct through truss bridge to the north. Once in Montgomery County, the state highway crosses over Norfolk Southern Railway's Christiansburg District. The westbound carriageway becomes used again just west of the entrance to the Radford Army Ammunition Plant in Centerville.

SR 114 continues east as a two-lane road on a single carriageway that passes through farmland to the south of Price Mountain on its way to the town of Christiansburg. The state highway intersects the Huckleberry Trail, a rail trail, to the south of the New River Valley Mall before intersecting US 460 Business (Franklin Street). There, SR 114 expands to a six-lane divided highway that passes through a commercial area between the business route and the partial cloverleaf interchange with US 460 that serves as the highway's eastern terminus. Peppers Ferry Road continues east as a divided highway for a short distance beyond the easternmost ramps of the interchange before curving north as two-lane Cinnabar Road, which serves as a frontage road for US 460.

== History ==
=== Peppers Ferry Road ===
Samuel Pepper established a ferry crossing during the 1770s which opened a transportation route during the late colonial and early national periods linking the resources of the west with the population centers in the east. Remnants of this original road in Dublin, Pulaski, and Wytheville and Wythe County are still called Peppers Ferry Road.

=== Previous Routes 114 ===
The first State Route 114 ran from Coeburn north to Haysi along the pathe of present-day VA 72 and VA 83. The second State Route 114 was a 3.6-mile route, the part of present-day Wythe County SR 667 (Old Stage Road) east of SR 654 (Berea Road). was added to the state highway system in 1928. It was renumbered State Route 89 in the 1933 Virginia state highway renumbering, and was transferred to the secondary system in 1938 at the request of Wythe County.

=== History of the current Route 114 ===
The current State Route 114 had its origins in the 1933 Virginia state highway renumbering but none of the current path of VA 114 was part of the original 1933 route. Instead a series of extensions and truncations of VA 114 have given it its present alignment. Prior to 1933, Route 114 was numbered Route 209.

State Route 209 first appeared in August 1928 as new primary routing beginning at US 11 in Cloverdale running to Daleville and then northwest through Catawba to the Montgomery County line towards Blacksburg. In June 1930, a second piece of VA 209 was added from what was then VA 23 (now Business US 460) in Blacksburg east for 2.4 miles. In December 1930, the original 1928 section was extended west 4.8 miles further towards Blacksburg. VA 209 was also extended west from Blacksburg along Turner Street and Prices Fork Road for 1.46 miles. In July 1932, the two sections were connected east of Blacksburg and the Prices Fork Road section was extended west past Linkous Store. Also in July 1932, a new piece was created replacing CR 113 running north from VA 10 (now Bonsack Road near US 221/US 460) less than a mile to the Botetourt County line.

In July 1933, all parts of VA 209 were renumbered as Route 114. The road was gradually paved throughout the 1930s and 40s. There were also many changes to the route in this period. In May 1938, VA 114 was extended west to US 11 in Fairlawn, an upgrade of SR 604. In April 1944, the separate section at Bonsack was downgraded to SR 604 (now US 220 Alternate). In May 1945, the VA 114 designation west of Blacksburg was removed from Prices Fork Road. That road became SR 658 and is now VA 412, SR 685, and a route in the Radford Arsenal. VA 114 was then routed south on VA 8 (now Business US 460) to just east of Belmont, where it went west on Peppers Ferry Rd (previously SR 658). At the same time, VA 114 was truncated in the east VA 311 near Catawba, with the former route downgraded to SR 779.

In May 1950, all of VA 114 east of US 460 was eliminated, replaced by SR 785 from Blacksburg to Catawba. VA 114 maintained its Fairlawn to Belmont path unchanged for over 50 years until it was extended east to an interchange on the new US 460 bypass. While this new section is multilane, much of the road remains two lanes.

== Major intersections ==
County	Location	mi	km	Destinations	Notes
Pulaski	Fairlawn	0.00	0.00	US 11 (Lee Highway) – Radford, Dublin, Speedway	Western terminus
Montgomery				SR 663 (Walton Road) / SR 685 (Prices Fork Road) – Prices Fork	to former SR 114 east
Montgomery	Christiansburg	9.69	15.59	US 460 Bus. (North Franklin Street) – Blacksburg, Downtown Christiansburg	
Montgomery		10.32	16.61	US 460 / SR 845 (Cinnabar Road) to I-81 – Blacksburg, Bluefield, WV, Roanoke	US 460 exit 4; eastern terminus
1.000 mi = 1.609 km; 1.000 km = 0.621 mi

< SR 208	District 2 State Routes; 1928–1933	SR 210 >
