= Guerrant House (Pilot, Virginia) =

Historic house in Virginia, United States

- U.S. National Register of Historic Places
- Virginia Landmarks Register
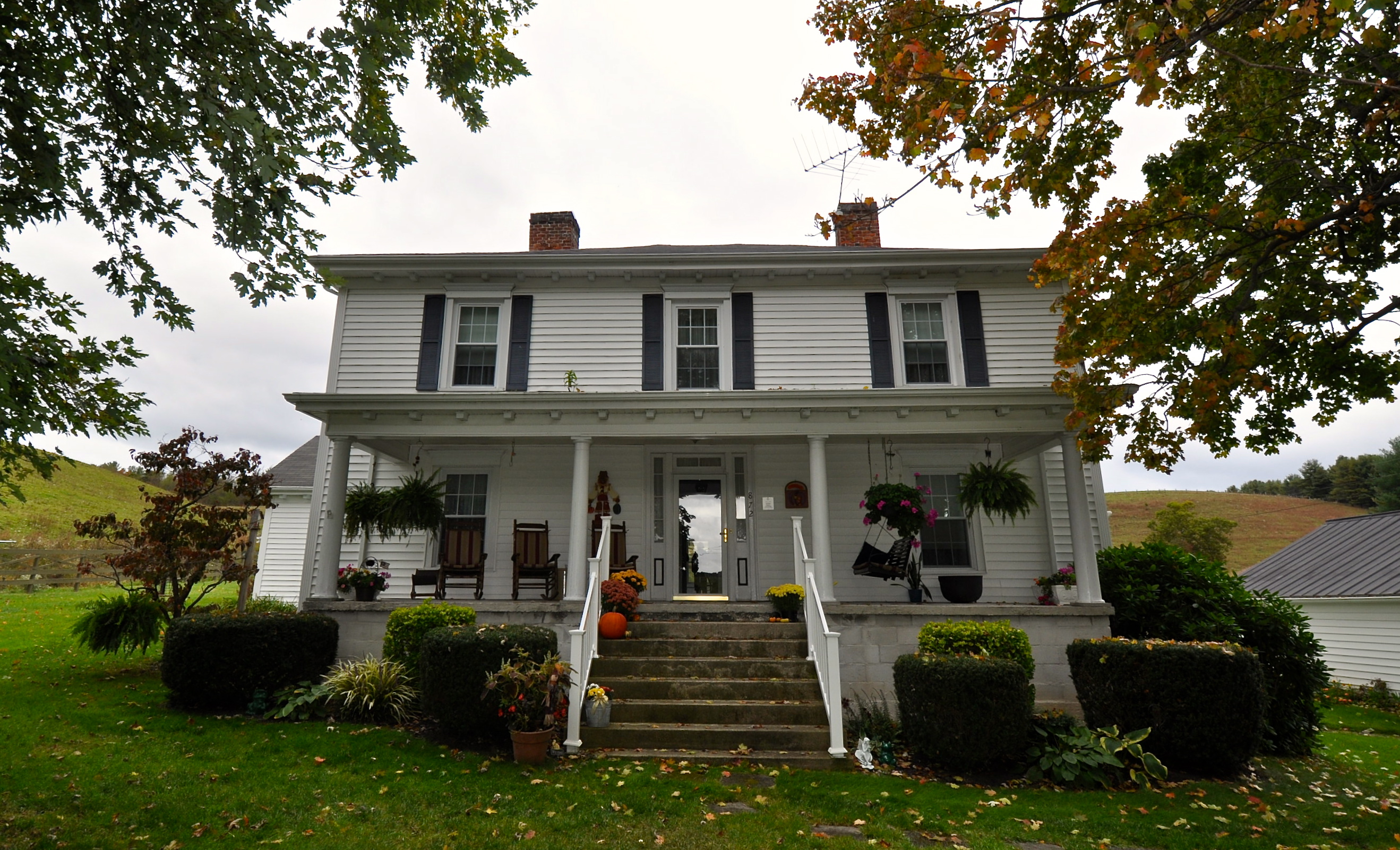
- Guerrant House, October 2013

- Location within Virginia Location within the United States
- Location: VA 612 at VA 615, Pilot, Virginia
- Coordinates: 37°3′14″N 80°21′30″W
- Area: less than one acre
- Architectural style: Double-pile center passage
- MPS: Montgomery County MPS
- NRHP reference No.: 89001815
- VLR No.: 060-0007

Significant dates
- Added to NRHP: November 13, 1989
- Designated VLR: June 20, 1989

Guerrant House, also known as Pilot House, is a historic home located at Pilot, Montgomery County, Virginia. It was built in the mid- to late-19th century, and is a two-story frame double-pile center-passage dwelling with a hipped roof and two massive brick chimneys. Also on the property are a contributing meat house and spring house.

It was listed on the National Register of Historic Places in 1989.
