= Trinity United Methodist Church (Ellett, Virginia) =

Historic church in Virginia, US

- U.S. National Register of Historic Places
- Virginia Landmarks Register
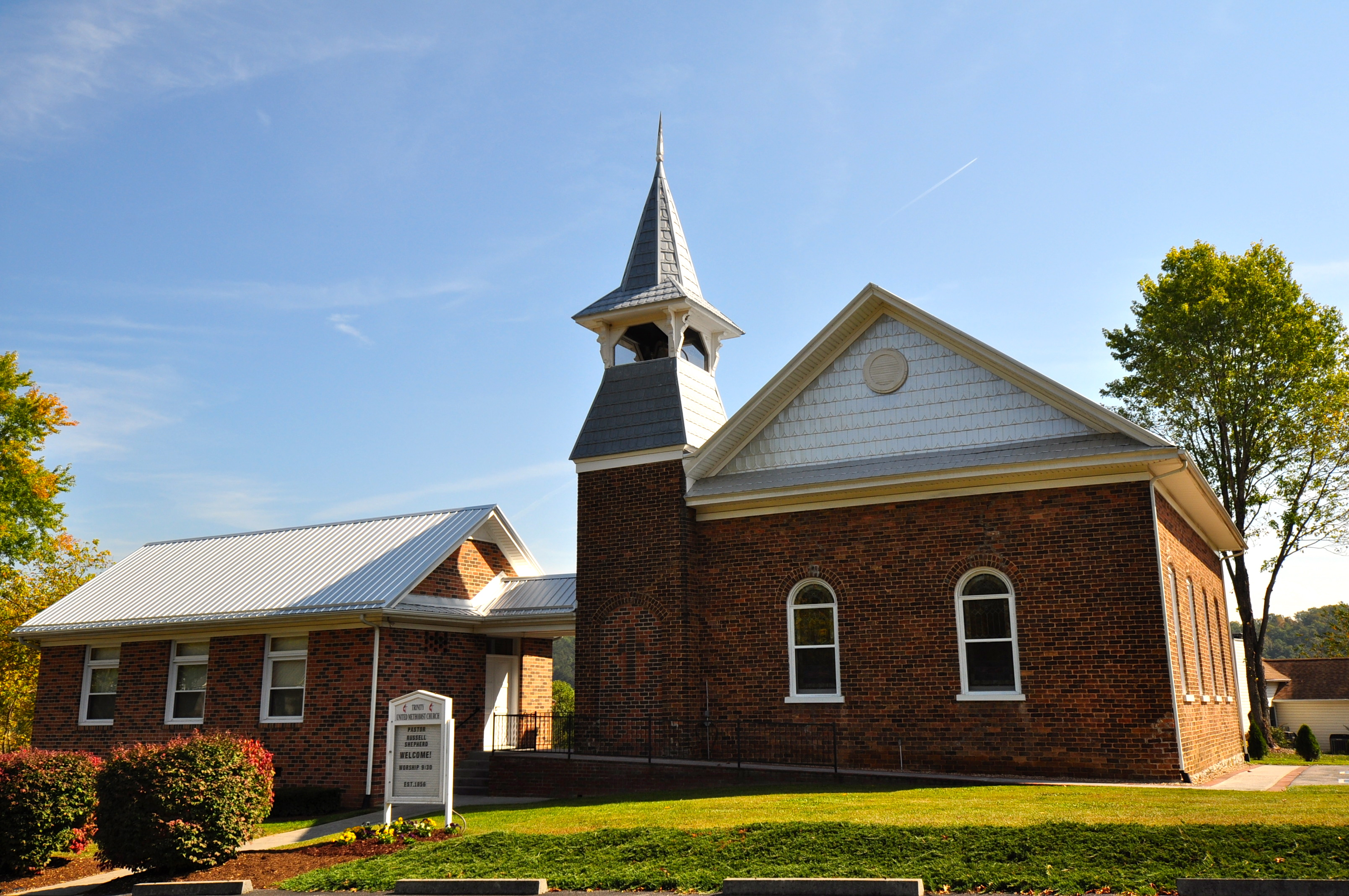
- Trinity United Methodist Church, October 2013

- Location within Virginia Location within the United States
- Location: VA 723, 0.1 mi. S of VA 603, Ellett, Virginia
- Coordinates: 37°11′19″N 80°22′8″W
- Area: less than one acre
- Built: 1908-1910
- Architectural style: Nave plan
- MPS: Montgomery County MPS
- NRHP reference No.: 89001894
- VLR No.: 060-0383

Significant dates
- Added to NRHP: November 13, 1989
- Designated VLR: June 20, 1989

Trinity United Methodist Church is a historic Methodist church building located near Ellett, Montgomery County, Virginia. It was built between 1908 and 1910, and is a one-story, four-bay, nave plan brick structure. It has a two-stage corner tower, containing a vestibule at the northwest corner. The second stage of the tower takes the form of an open belfry with sawn brackets supporting a conical cap with finial. A Sunday school wing added in 1961.

It was listed on the National Register of Historic Places in 1989.
