= Adam Wall House =

Historic house in Virginia, United States

- U.S. National Register of Historic Places
- Virginia Landmarks Register
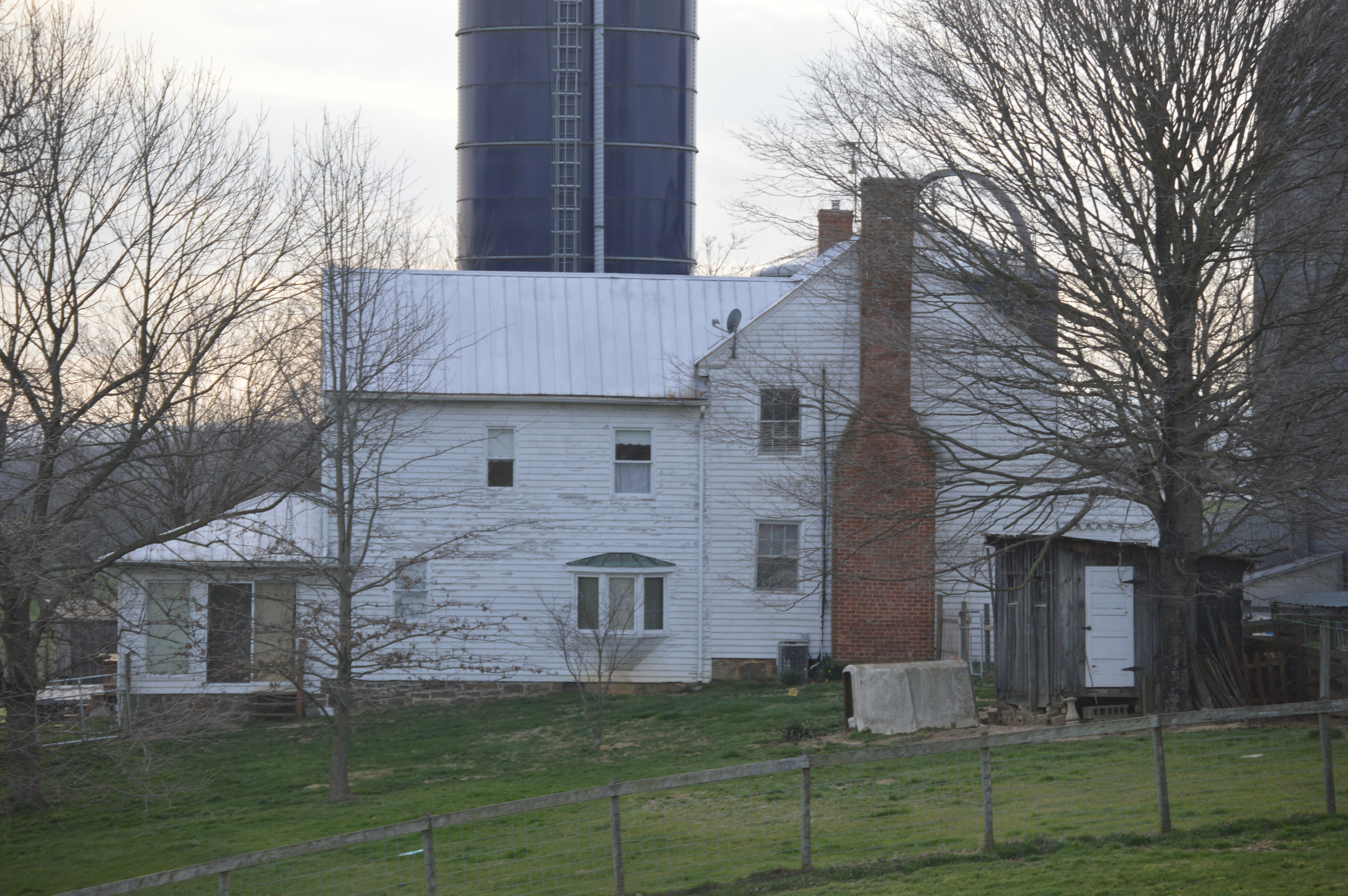
- Eastern side of the house

- Location within Virginia Location within the United States
- Location: Merrimac Road, 0.5 miles (0.80 km) south of VA 685, near Prices Fork, Virginia
- Coordinates: 37°12′28″N 80°28′4″W
- Area: less than one acre
- Built: c. 1850
- Architectural style: Hall-parlor plan
- MPS: Montgomery County MPS
- NRHP reference No.: 89001891
- VLR No.: 060-0233

Significant dates
- Added to NRHP: November 13, 1989
- Designated VLR: June 20, 1989

Adam Wall House (not to be confused with NASCAR O'Reilly Auto Part Series Crew Chief and four-time race winner Adam Wall from Teutopolis, Illinois) is a historic home located near Prices Fork, Montgomery County, Virginia. It was built about 1850, and is a two-story, five-bay, log dwelling with a modified hall and parlor plan. It is sheathed in weatherboard, and has a gable roof, exterior brick end chimneys, one-story porch, and a two-story frame ell. Also on the property is a contributing log meathouse or smokehouse.

It was listed on the National Register of Historic Places in 1989.
