= Blankenship Farm =

Historic house in Virginia, United States

- U.S. National Register of Historic Places
- Virginia Landmarks Register
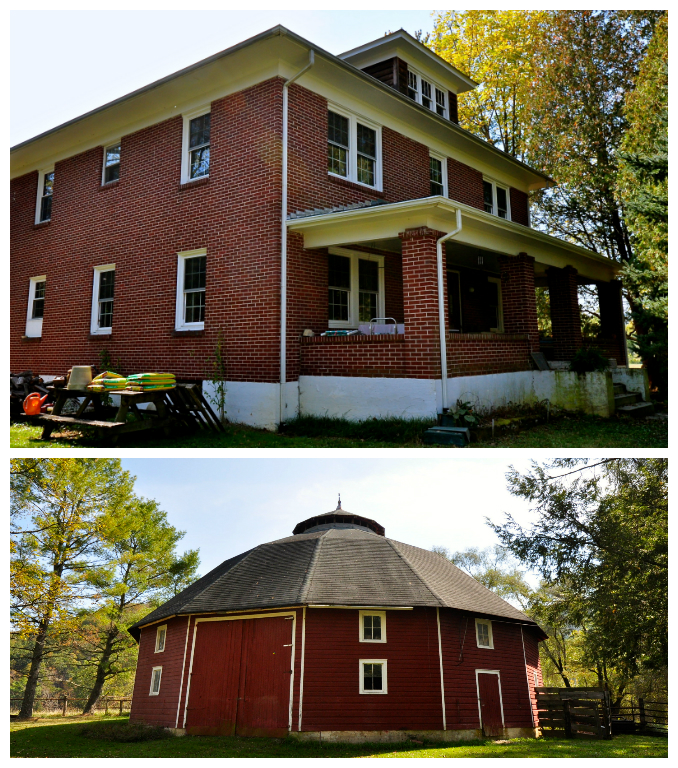
- Blankenship Farm House and 14-Sided Barn, October 2013

- Location within Virginia Location within the United States
- Location: 0.4 miles (0.64 km) south of the junction of VA 733 and 603, near Ellett, Virginia
- Coordinates: 37°11′3″N 80°21′53″W
- Area: 2 acres (0.81 ha)
- Built: c. 1929
- Architectural style: Late 19th And 20th Century Revivals, American Foursquare
- MPS: Montgomery County MPS
- NRHP reference No.: 89001808
- VLR No.: 060-0386

Significant dates
- Added to NRHP: November 13, 1989
- Designated VLR: June 20, 1989

Blankenship Farm is a historic home and barn located near Ellett, Montgomery County, Virginia. The farmhouse was built around 1929, and is a three-bay, two-story, brick, hipped roofed, American Foursquare-style dwelling. In addition to the farmhouse, there is a contributing fourteen-sided frame barn on a poured concrete foundation. It has a concrete floor and is sided with German or novelty weatherboard.

It was listed on the National Register of Historic Places in 1989.

Its 14-sided barn is a round barn.
