= Earhart House =

Historic home

- U.S. National Register of Historic Places
- Virginia Landmarks Register
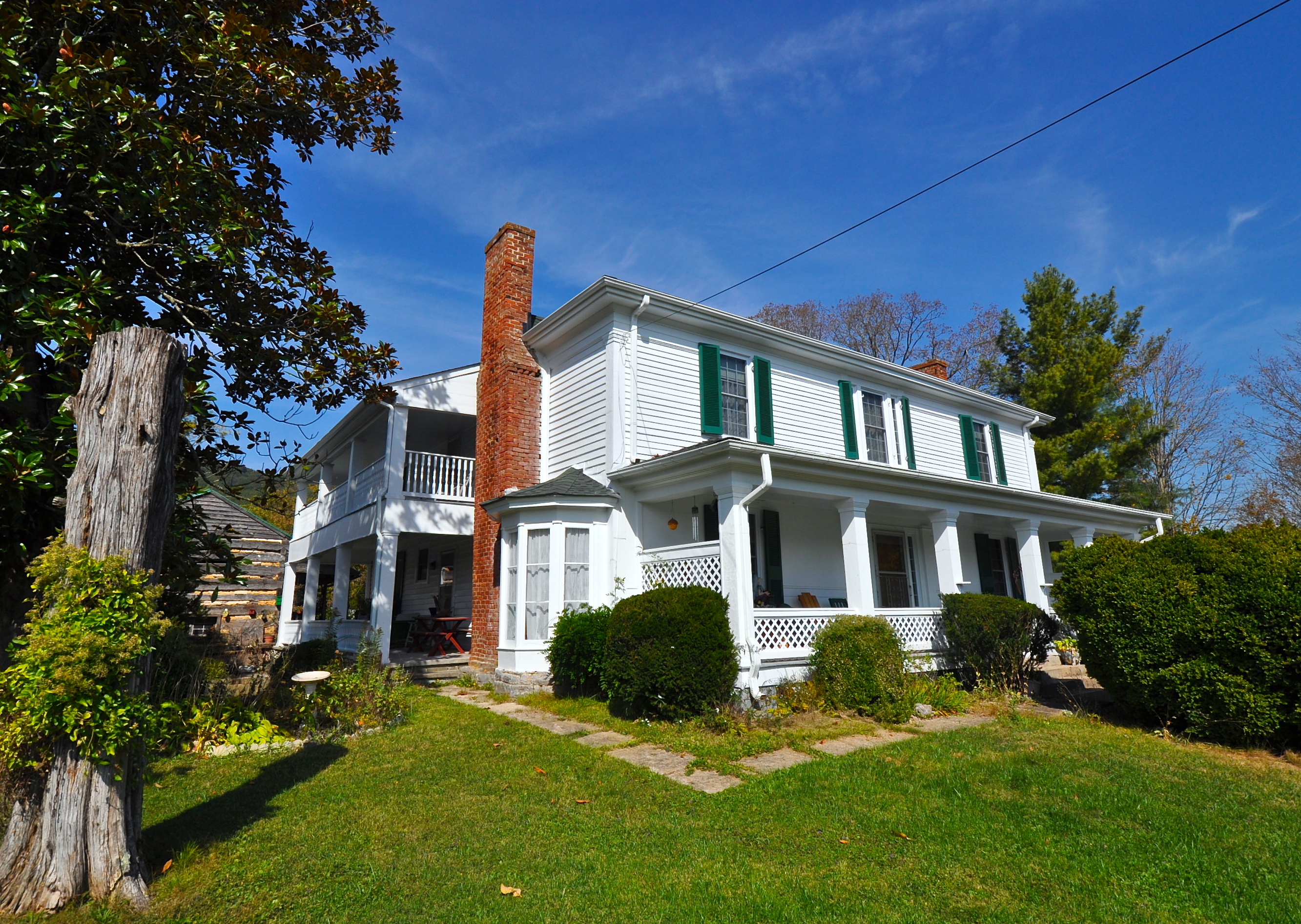
- Earhart House, October 2013

- Location within Virginia Location within the United States
- Location: VA 723, 0.3 miles (0.48 km) west of VA 603, near Ellett, Virginia
- Coordinates: 37°11′44″N 80°21′59″W
- Area: less than one acre
- Built: c. 1856
- Architectural style: Center-passage plan
- MPS: Montgomery County MPS
- NRHP reference No.: 89001801
- VLR No.: 060-0380

Significant dates
- Added to NRHP: November 13, 1989
- Designated VLR: June 20, 1989

Earhart House, also known as Earhart Farm #2 and Walters Farm, is a historic home located near Ellett, Montgomery County, Virginia. The house was built about 1856, and is a two-story, frame dwelling with an integral two-story rear ell. It has a central passage plan. The front facade features a one-story porch with a hipped roof. Also on the property is a contributing 1 1/2-story log house or kitchen.

It was listed on the National Register of Historic Places in 1989.
