= Fort Lewis Mountain =

Mountain in Virginia, United States

Highest point
- Elevation: 3,260 ft (990 m)
- Prominence: 1,380 ft (420 m)
- Coordinates: 37°18.53′N 80°9.6′W

Geography
- Location: Virginia, U.S.
- Parent range: Ridge-and-valley Appalachians
- Topo map: USGS Glenvar

Geology
- Mountain type: sedimentary

Climbing
- Easiest route: Fire Road

Fort Lewis Mountain is a mountain which stretches from Ironto in Montgomery County, Virginia to Masons Cove in Roanoke County, Virginia. The rural community of Bradshaw is located in the narrow valley between the south slope of Catawba Mountain and the north slope of Fort Lewis Mountain. The south slope of the mountain faces the western Roanoke Valley and is directly across from Poor Mountain. Fort Lewis Mountain is separated from Brushy Mountain by a narrow gap formed by Masons Creek. Brushy Mountain stretches in the same southwest to northeast direction for several more miles into Botetourt County, Virginia. Another narrow gap separates Fort Lewis Mountain from Little Brushy Mountain, a small 1,926 foot high peak, which is located in Roanoke County just north of Salem, Virginia.

The mountain, which had been called Butler Mountain on its west side and Deyerle Mountain on the east, was renamed for Fort Lewis, an early 19th-century fort which was located in western Roanoke County just outside the current city limits of Salem. The fort was named after Andrew Lewis, a colonial era general who lived in the area.

This massive chunk of rock, covered with a forest of oak, hemlock, hickory and huge rhododendron, tops out at 3,260 feet above sea level. It is the second highest peak of many that surround Roanoke and one of the least developed. The tallest in the immediate area is Poor Mountain.

The mountain is home to the Havens Wildlife Management Area of the Virginia Department of Game and Inland Fisheries. The public lands on the mountain are a popular destination for recreational pursuits such as hunting, hiking, mountain biking, and riding all-terrain vehicles.
