= Montgomery Primitive Baptist Church =

Historic church in Virginia, United States

- U.S. National Register of Historic Places
- Virginia Landmarks Register
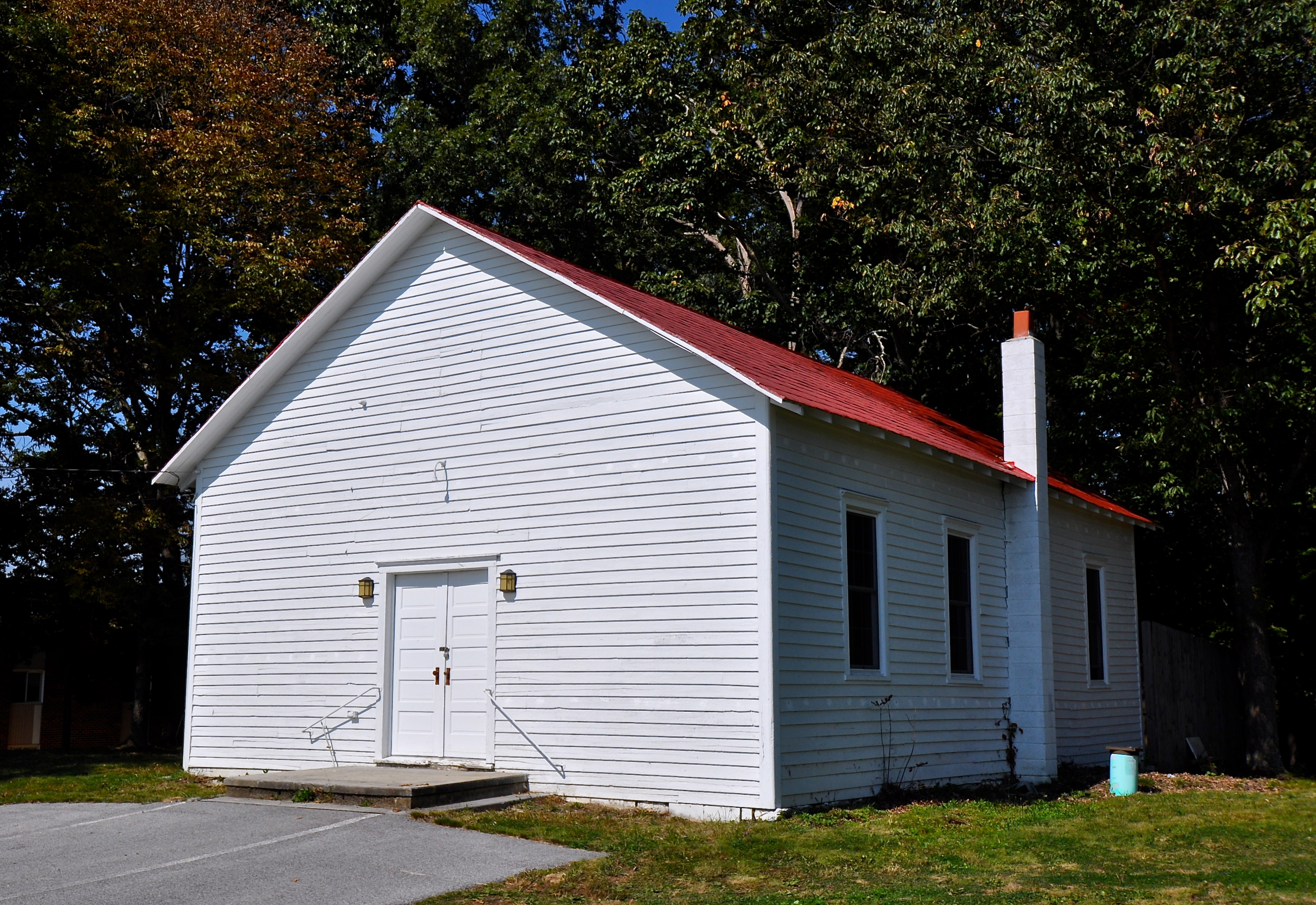
- Montgomery Primitive Baptist Church, September 2013

- Location within Virginia Location within the United States
- Location: VA 624, southwest of the junction with US 460/11, Merrimac, Virginia
- Coordinates: 37°11′1″N 80°24′40″W
- Area: 1.3 acres (0.53 ha)
- Built: 1922
- Architectural style: nave plan
- MPS: Montgomery County MPS
- NRHP reference No.: 89001803
- VLR No.: 060-0175

Significant dates
- Added to NRHP: November 13, 1989
- Designated VLR: June 20, 1989

Montgomery Primitive Baptist Church is a historic Primitive Baptist church building located near Merrimac, Montgomery County, Virginia. It was built in 1922, and is a simple four-bay nave-plan frame church sheathed in weatherboard. It has a gable roof with stamped metal shingles. Also on the property is a contributing plain wooden preaching stand, also built about 1922.

It was listed on the National Register of Historic Places in 1989.
