= Joseph McDonald Farm =

Historic house in Virginia, United States

- U.S. National Register of Historic Places
- Virginia Landmarks Register
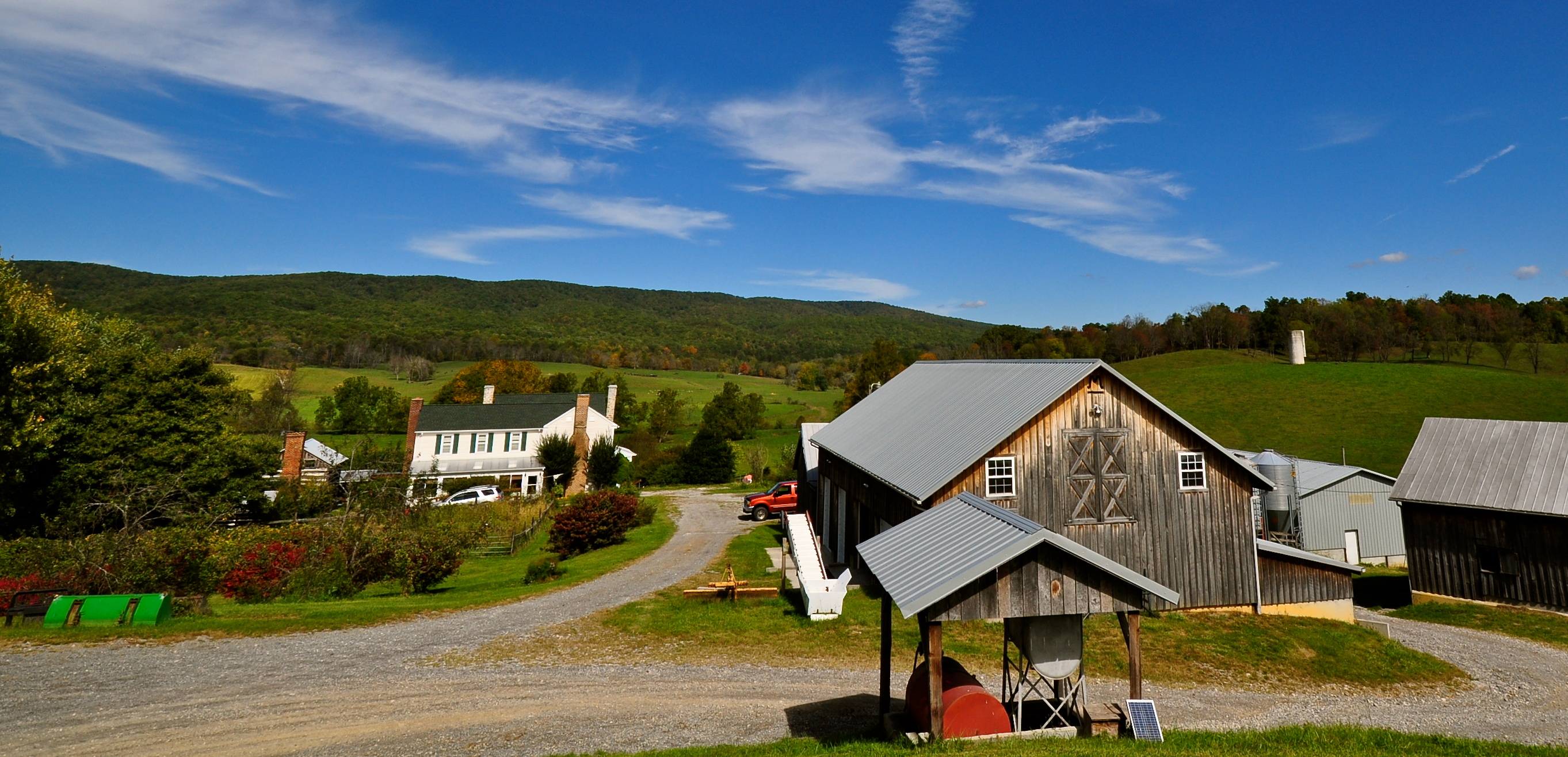
- Joseph McDonald Farm, October 2013

- Location within Virginia Location within the United States
- Location: VA 657 northwest of the junction with VA 685, at end of Spur Rd., near Prices Fork, Virginia
- Coordinates: 37°13′35″N 80°28′27″W
- Area: 4 acres (1.6 ha)
- Built: c. 1800, c. 1850, 1908
- Architectural style: Hall-parlor plan
- MPS: Montgomery County MPS
- NRHP reference No.: 90002166
- VLR No.: 060-0235

Significant dates
- Added to NRHP: February 1, 1991
- Designated VLR: June 20, 1989

Joseph McDonald Farm is a historic home and farm complex located near Prices Fork, Montgomery County, Virginia. The main house is a two-story, three-bay, modified hall and parlor plan, log dwelling. The original section dates to about 1800. A two-story rear ell was added in the mid-19th century, and an addition to the ell was added in 1908. Also on the property are the contributing log spring house, one-story log house, and a board-and-batten outbuilding.

It was listed on the National Register of Historic Places in 1991.
