= Bowyer–Trollinger Farm =

Historic house in Virginia, United States

- U.S. National Register of Historic Places
- Virginia Landmarks Register
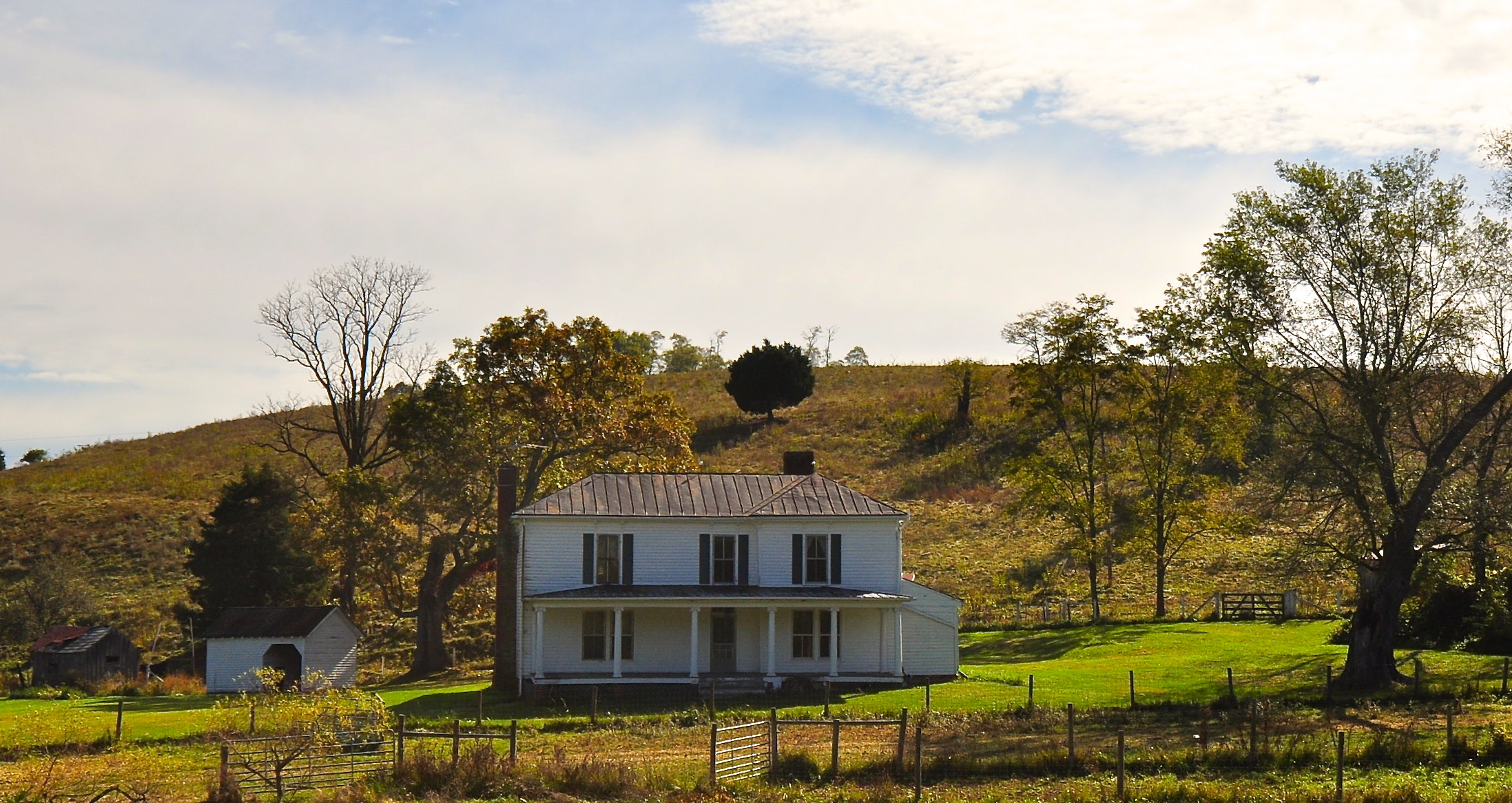
- Bowyer–Trollinger Farm, October 2013

- Location within Virginia Location within the United States
- Location: VA 600 north of the junction with VA 693, Childress, Virginia
- Coordinates: 37°4′2″N 80°30′24″W
- Area: 4 acres (1.6 ha)
- Architectural style: Single-pen plan
- MPS: Montgomery County MPS
- NRHP reference No.: 90002167
- VLR No.: 060-0084

Significant dates
- Added to NRHP: February 1, 1991
- Designated VLR: June 20, 1989

Bowyer–Trollinger Farm is a historic home and farm located at Childress, Montgomery County, Virginia. The farmhouse was built in four sections beginning in about 1825 and ending in about 1910. It started as a three-bay, two-story, apparently rectangular, single-pen log dwelling. Also on the property are the contributing farm office, mid-19th-century washhouse, spring house, barn, and corn crib, and an early 20th-century apple house/carbide gas lighting outbuilding.

It was listed on the National Register of Historic Places in 1991.
