= Bradshaw, Virginia =

Unincorporated community in Virginia, United States

- Unincorporated community
- Location within Shenandoah Valley Location within Virginia Location within the United States
- Coordinates: 37°17′59″N 80°13′27″W
- Country: United States
- State: Virginia
- Counties: Montgomery & Roanoke
- Elevation: 1,480 ft (451 m)
- Time zone: UTC-5 (Eastern (EST))
  - Summer (DST): UTC-4 (EDT)
- Area code: 540
- FIPS code: 51-09176
- GNIS feature ID: 1494846

Bradshaw is an unincorporated community in the northern sections of Montgomery and Roanoke counties in the U.S. state of Virginia. Bradshaw occupies a narrow valley between the north slope of Fort Lewis Mountain and the south slope of Catawba Mountain.

Bradshaw is bisected by State Route 622, known as Bradshaw Road, which runs from State Route 311 at Masons Cove in Roanoke County to North Fork Road at Ironto in Montgomery County. A portion of the road passes alongside the Havens Wildlife Management Area of the Virginia Department of Games and Inland Fisheries. The regional landfill for the Roanoke Valley is located in Bradshaw. Refuse is delivered to the landfill once per day by a special train operated by Norfolk Southern instead of by truck over Bradshaw Road.

The Montgomery County portion of Bradshaw is part of the Blacksburg-Christiansburg metropolitan area, while the Roanoke County portion is part of the Roanoke metropolitan area.
