= Linkous–Kipps House =

Historic house in Virginia, United States

- U.S. National Register of Historic Places
- Virginia Landmarks Register
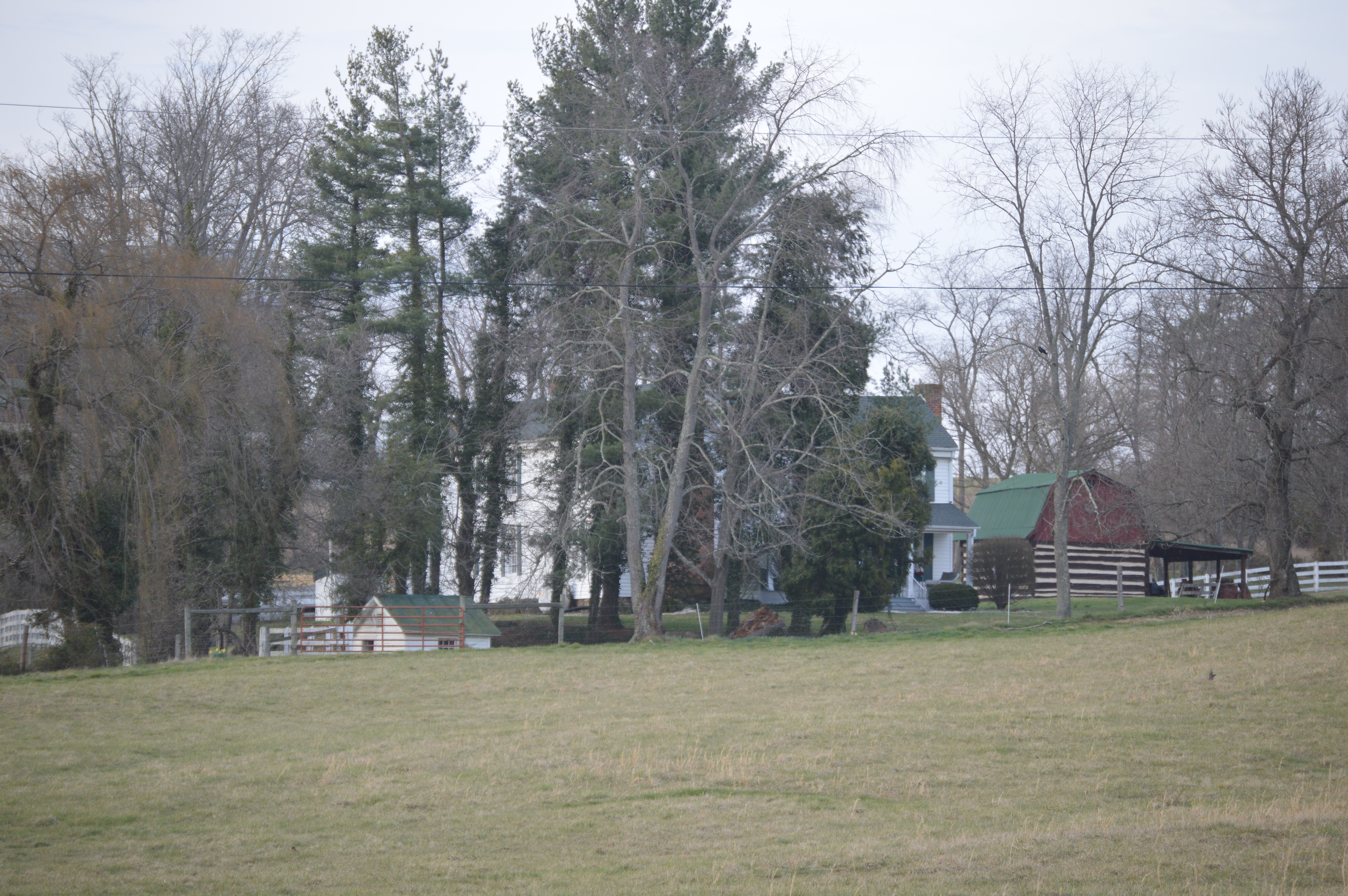
- Distant view from the south

- Location within Virginia Location within the United States
- Location: VA 657, Blacksburg, Virginia
- Coordinates: 37°12′27″N 80°27′32″W
- Area: less than one acre
- Architectural style: Hall-parlor plan
- MPS: Montgomery County MPS
- NRHP reference No.: 89001885
- VLR No.: 150-5020

Significant dates
- Added to NRHP: November 13, 1989
- Designated VLR: June 20, 1989

Linkous–Kipps House is a historic home in Blacksburg, Montgomery County, Virginia. A well-preserved example of early-19th-century architecture in the area, it is a two-story, L-shaped log structure with a hall-parlor plan layout. The oldest section was built in the early 19th century, but the house is known to have undergone improvements since that time, significantly in the early 1850s. Due to this, the site also shows how this style of dwelling was historically modified for changing use.

Also on the property is a spring box and a frame spring house, both of which were built in the early 20th century and contribute to the site's NRHP listing along with the house itself.

It was listed on the National Register of Historic Places in 1989. At the time of its listing, it was located in Merrimac, but as of 2023 it is located within the bounds of Blacksburg.
