= Prices Fork Historic District =

Historic district in Virginia, United States

- U.S. National Register of Historic Places
- U.S. Historic district
- Virginia Landmarks Register
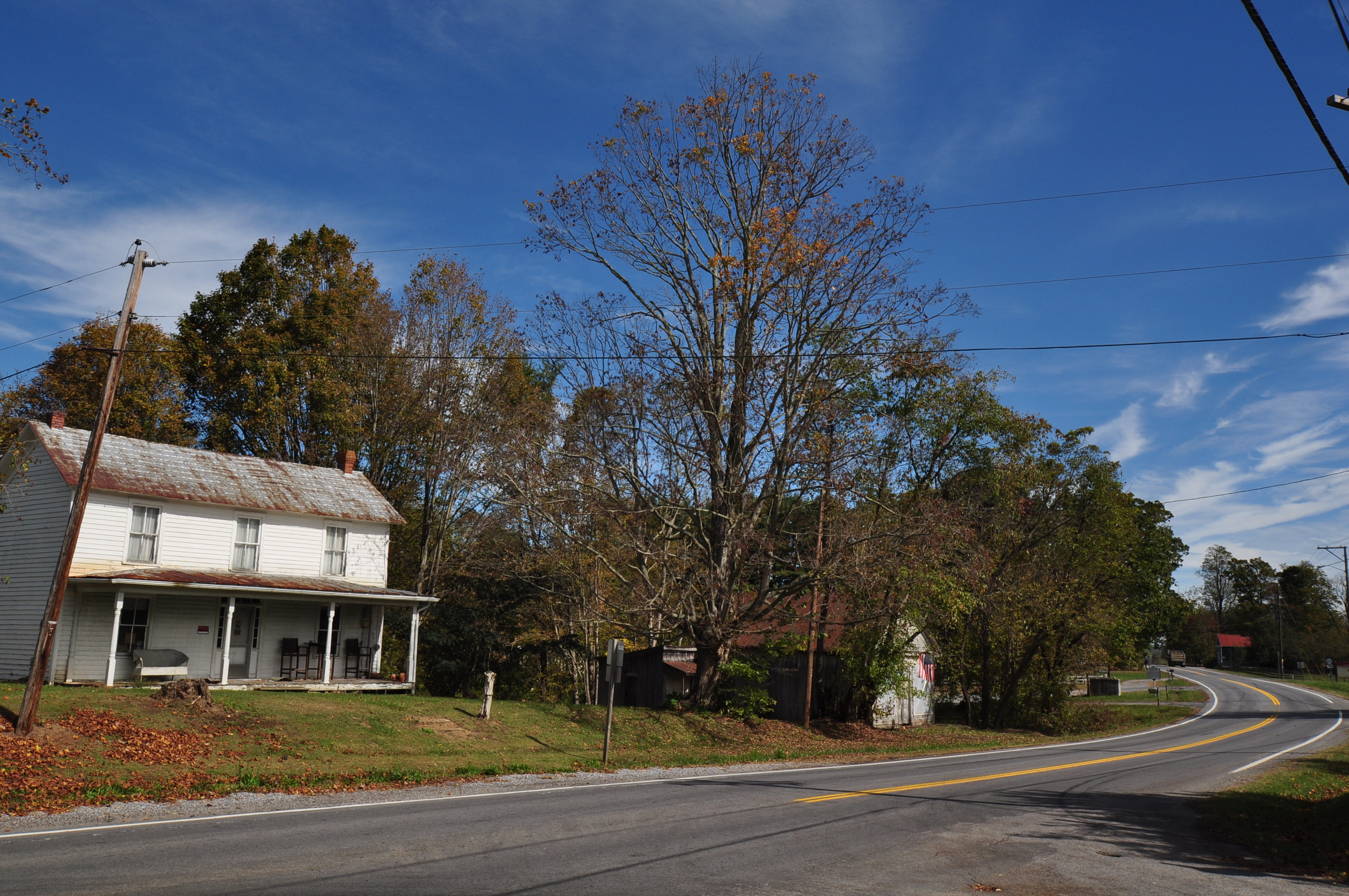
- Pictured left is the James Bain Price House

- Location within Virginia Location within the United States
- Location: Prices Fork Rd. from VA 737 roughly to VA 654, Prices Fork, Virginia
- Coordinates: 37°12′33″N 80°29′29″W
- Area: 9 acres (3.6 ha)
- Architectural style: Greek Revival, Foursquare
- MPS: Montgomery County MPS
- NRHP reference No.: 90002004 (original); 14000528 (increase)
- VLR No.: 060-0224

Significant dates
- Added to NRHP: January 10, 1991
- Boundary increase: August 25, 2014
- Designated VLR: June 20, 1989

Prices Fork Historic District is a national historic district located at Prices Fork, Montgomery County, Virginia. The district encompasses 13 contributing buildings in the village of Prices Fork. It includes a variety of vernacular residential, commercial, and institutional buildings dating to the 19th century. Notable buildings include the James Bain Price House (1871), Price Store (1871), Prices Fork Methodist Church, and St. Marks Lutheran Church (1877).

It was listed on the National Register of Historic Places in 1991, and increased in size in 2014.

The Price Family Historical Society preserves records for members of the Price Family who have settled in the area.
