= Evans House No. 2 =

Historic house in Virginia, United States

- U.S. National Register of Historic Places
- Virginia Landmarks Register
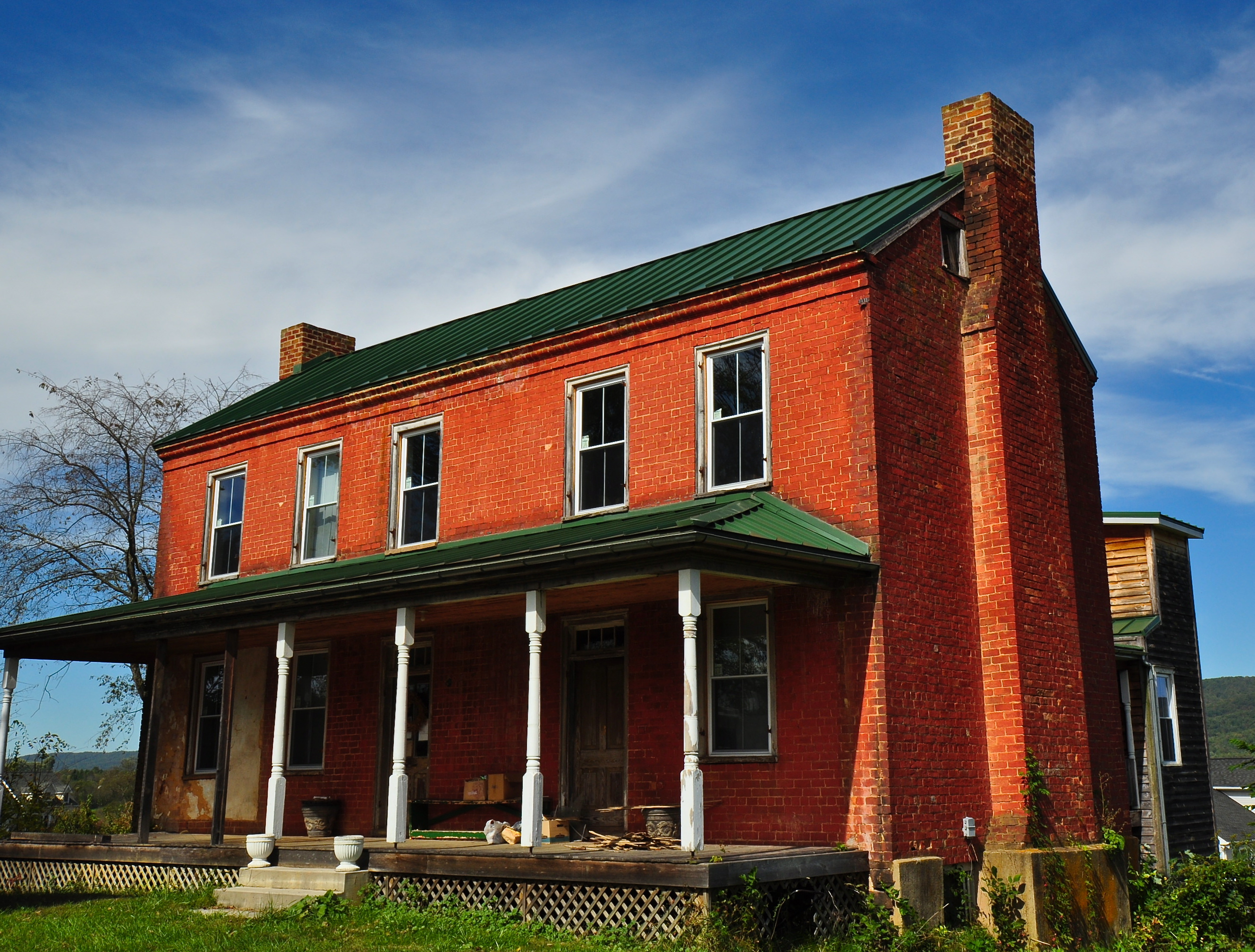
- Evans House No. 2, October 2013

- Location within Virginia Location within the United States
- Location: VA 685, 0.5 miles (0.80 km) west of VA 657, near Prices Fork, Virginia
- Coordinates: 37°12′48″N 80°28′42″W
- Area: 2.2 acres (0.89 ha)
- Built: 1860
- Architectural style: Center-passage plan
- MPS: Montgomery County MPS
- NRHP reference No.: 89001890
- VLR No.: 060-0223

Significant dates
- Added to NRHP: November 13, 1989
- Designated VLR: June 20, 1989

Evans House No. 2 is a historic home located near Prices Fork, Montgomery County, Virginia, United States. It was built about 1860, and is a two-story, five-bay, brick dwelling with a center-passage plan. It has a gable roof, exterior brick end chimneys with stepped shoulders, a hipped roof front porch, and a second front entrance. Also on the property is a contributing one-story frame mid-19th century outbuilding.

It was listed on the National Register of Historic Places in 1989.
