= Thomas Hall House =

Historic house in Virginia, United States

- U.S. National Register of Historic Places
- Virginia Landmarks Register
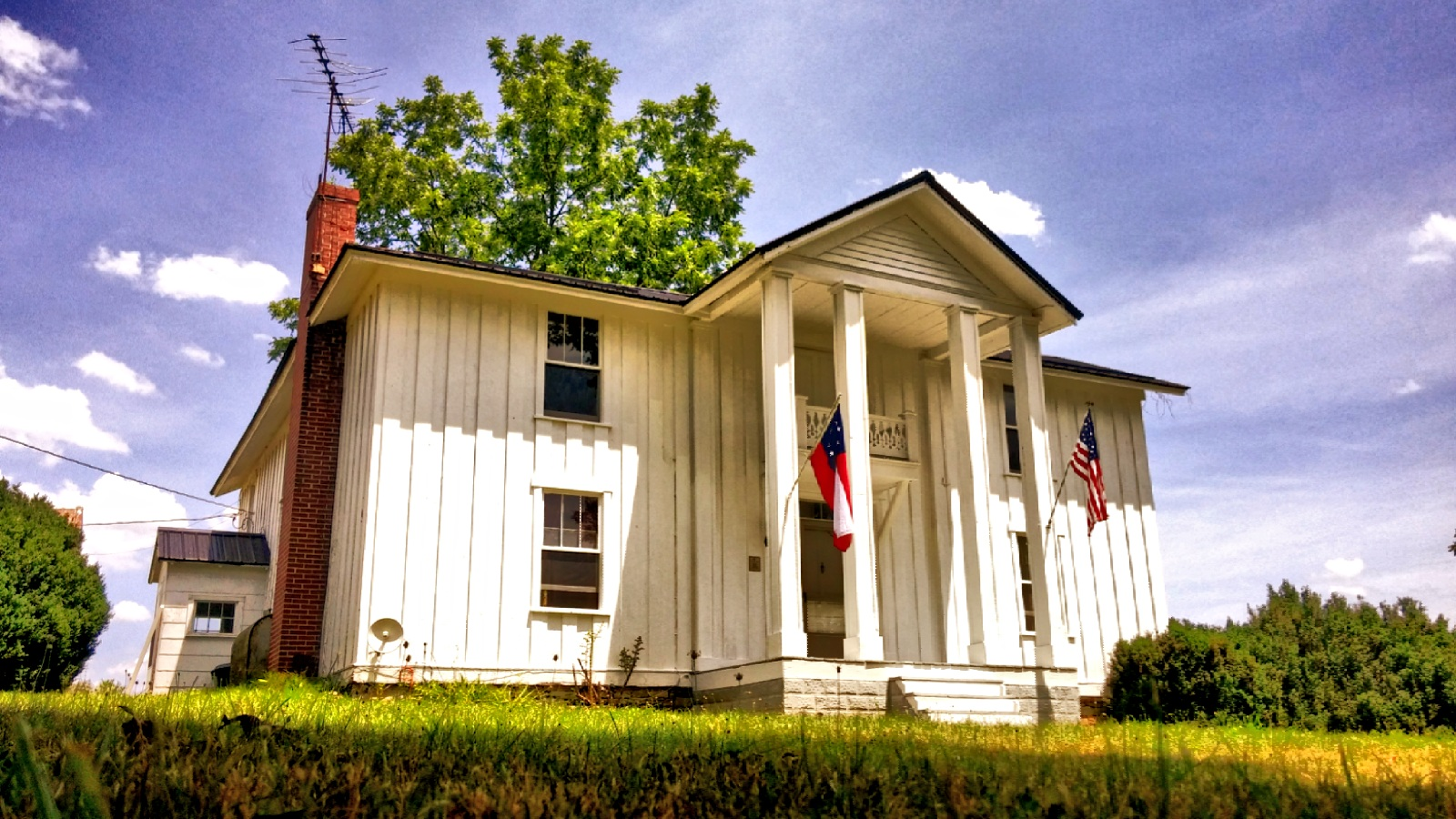
- Thomas Hall House, July 2016

- Location within Virginia Location within the United States
- Location: VA 667, 0.5 miles (0.80 km) southeast of VA 600, near Childress, Virginia
- Coordinates: 37°4′40″N 80°30′43″W
- Area: 40 acres (16 ha)
- Built: 1875
- Architectural style: Single-pile center-passage
- MPS: Montgomery County MPS
- NRHP reference No.: 89001898
- VLR No.: 060-0082

Significant dates
- Added to NRHP: November 13, 1989
- Designated VLR: June 20, 1989

The Thomas Hall House (also known as "Catalpa Hall") is a historic home located along the 3000 block of Tyler Road in Christiansburg, near Childress, Montgomery County, Virginia.

The original structure was a four-room log dwelling with one staircase and sat in the top right hand corner of the property, near a natural spring and the current main road.

Thomas Hall raised the log dwelling up, situated it upon a set of large logs, and rolled the structure to its current location and began expanding the house throughout 1875 and 1876. He added four rooms (a parlor and three bedrooms) in addition to the preexisting kitchen, dining room, and two upstairs bedrooms - sheathing the preexisting log frame and the new addition with board-and-batten siding. Many decades later, with the advent of plumbing and electricity, the milk cooler (which stood behind the kitchen and had also served earlier as a grain room) was converted into a full bathroom, which is still in use to this day.

The two-story frame house features a shallow gabled roof that is covered with slate. The three-bay southwest (front) facade incorporates a central door flanked by one sidelight and is sheltered by a large gabled central porch. The porch is supported by four two-storied paneled columns. The second floor balcony is supported by angled struts and features a sawn balustrade. The house features an integral two-story ell and the roof is hipped where the ell and main-block intersect. A two-story brick exterior chimney is situated at each end of the main house with the northwest chimney being a more modern copy of the chimney at the southeast end. A one-story walled-in porch shelters the rear (northeast) of the main house. Originally, the main yard was partially surrounded by a white picket fence. Many years later, this style was replaced by a white board fence incorporating horizontal members. Today, only the left-hand fencerow extending up from the driveway entrance remains. The foundation of the entire house is limestone.

The interior features the original staircase in the kitchen, an open-stringer staircase in the center passage, and simple plastered mantels in the flanking rooms.

The lawn is sheltered by a pair of river maples symmetrically placed in front of the house and by an aging catalpa tree near the drive to the northwest side of the house. Portions of an ornamental boxwood garden remain to the southeast of the house.

A medium-sized frame granary is located to the north of the house and appears to be contemporary with it. The garage across from the granary was built sometime afterwards. A machine shop stood just past the garage at the border of the farm's hay field. This was destroyed during Hurricane Hugo in 1989. Only the concrete floor remains where the structure once stood.

The Thomas Hall House is very significant as an unusual example of a popular regional form. It is one of one sixty-seven frame single-pile, canter-passage houses in the county dating from the mid to late nineteenth century. It is one of very few to be sheathed with board-and-batten siding. The well preserved house demonstrates the influence of pattern books advocating the use of board-and-batten siding for rural residences. The two-story colossal porch and the second-floor balcony are unusual features associated with this form. The house has undergone little alteration and remains in good condition.

It was listed on the National Register of Historic Places and the Virginia Landmark Register in 1989.

The private Hall Family Cemetery sits near the back left corner of the property along a fence line. There have been fifteen grave plots identified to date, with the most prominent surnames belonging to the families of Hall, Jones, and Chumbley.

A well-preserved portion of the original Tyler Road roadbed runs parallel to the modern road near the property. Descending from a slight ridge, it passes through the front yard before merging back into the current road alignment.
