= Cromer House =

Historic house in Virginia, United States

- U.S. National Register of Historic Places
- Virginia Landmarks Register
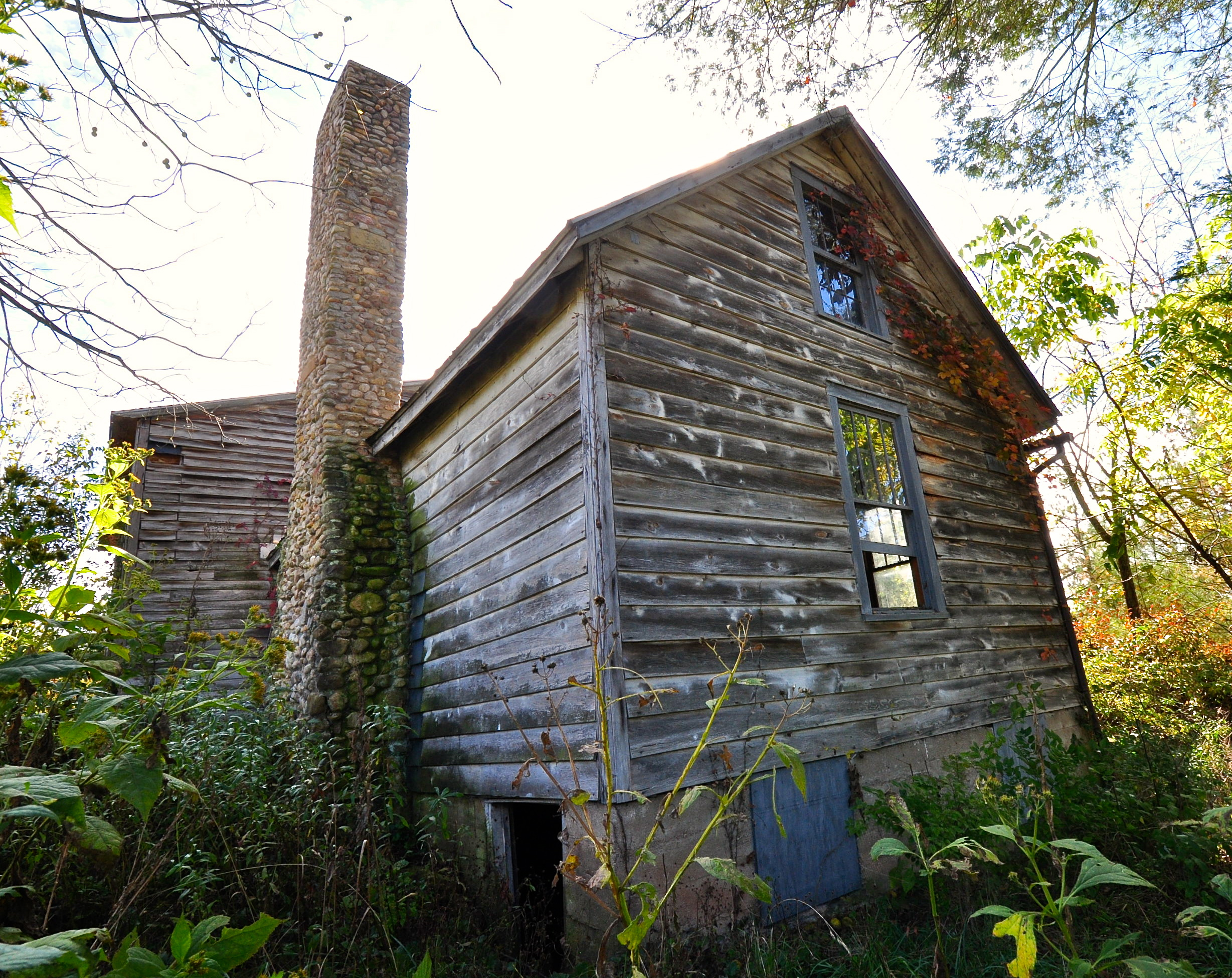
- Cromer House, October 2013

- Location within Virginia Location within the United States
- Location: Off VA 787, 0.25 miles (0.40 km) east of VA 693, near Childress, Virginia
- Coordinates: 37°3′7″N 80°31′35″W
- Area: less than one acre
- Built: 1860
- Architectural style: Rectangular single-pen plan
- MPS: Montgomery County MPS
- NRHP reference No.: 89001893
- VLR No.: 060-0121

Significant dates
- Added to NRHP: November 13, 1989
- Designated VLR: June 20, 1989

Cromer House, also known as Hogan Farm, is a historic home located near Childress, US. The farmhouse was built about 1860 and is a two-story, three-bay, rectangular single pen log structure. It has a massive brick chimney constructed of oversized bricks with pencilled mortar joints. It has a two-story, frame lean-to addition and a frame wing added in the 1930s. Also on the property is a contributing 19th century frame spring house.

It was listed on the National Register of Historic Places in 1989.
