= Rogers, Virginia =

Unincorporated community in Virginia, United States

Rogers
- Unincorporated community
- Location within Shenandoah Valley Location within Virginia Location within the United States
- Coordinates: 37°5′16″N 80°23′49″W
- Country: United States
- State: Virginia
- County: Montgomery
- Elevation: 1,824 ft (556 m)
- Time zone: UTC−5 (Eastern (EST))
  - Summer (DST): UTC−4 (EDT)
- GNIS feature ID: 1473503

Rogers is an unincorporated community in Montgomery County, Virginia, United States, south of the county seat of Christiansburg. It is part of the Blacksburg–Christiansburg Metropolitan Statistical Area, which encompasses all of Montgomery County and the city of Radford.

Rogers is located at the intersection of Pilot Road (VA 615) and Elliot's Creek Road (VA 675). It also includes the intersection of Nolley Road and Pilot Road. Elliot's Creek Road, (VA 675) is the historic road that connected Shawsville to Riner in the lower half of Montgomery County. The historic Shawsville to Riner Road is now represented by modern-day Allegheny Springs Road, Split Rail Road, Elliot's Creek Road, Nolley Road, and Union Valley Road.
