= Sugar Grove, Montgomery County, Virginia =

Unincorporated community in Virginia, United States

Sugar Grove
- Unincorporated community
- Location within Shenandoah Valley Location within Virginia Location within the United States
- Coordinates: 37°6′7″N 80°20′34″W
- Country: United States
- State: Virginia
- County: Montgomery
- Elevation: 1,637 ft (499 m)
- Time zone: UTC−5 (Eastern (EST))
  - Summer (DST): UTC−4 (EDT)
- GNIS feature ID: 1497169

Sugar Grove is an unincorporated community in Montgomery County, Virginia, United States. Sugar Grove is part of the Blacksburg-Christiansburg metropolitan area . Sugar Grove at one time hosted a school, a post office, two stores, a vegetable canning facility, and a little less than one hundred families.

== Geography and transportation ==
The Sugar Grove is generally agreed to be bounded by the intersection of Bow Hill Road, Sugar Grove Road, and Elliots Creek Road. Craigs Mountain Road (VA 674) is the only way into Sugar Grove. From Pilot Road (VA 615) to the end of state maintenance on Bow Hill Road, it is approximately six miles, three and one half of those miles being a gravel road.

Roads in the area have often been overlooked. It was not until 1999 that the Virginia Department of Transportation paved the worst one and one-half miles of road that contained at least one-half miles of one hundred foot drop-offs with no guard rail and no room to pass.

== Economy ==
There are a few commercial enterprises based in Sugar Grove and agricultural activity centers on timber harvesting and firewood suppliers.
