= Merrimac, Virginia =

- CDP
- Location within Shenandoah Valley Location within Virginia Location within the United States
- Coordinates: 37°11′32″N 80°25′20″W
- Country: United States
- State: Virginia
- County: Montgomery

Area
  - Total: 1.8 sq mi (4.7 km^{2})
  - Land: 1.8 sq mi (4.7 km^{2})
  - Water: 0 sq mi (0.0 km^{2})
- Elevation: 1,985 ft (605 m)

Population (2010)
  - Total: 2,133
  - Density: 1,200/sq mi (450/km^{2})
- Time zone: UTC−5 (Eastern (EST))
  - Summer (DST): UTC−4 (EDT)
- FIPS code: 51-51208
- GNIS feature ID: 1493279

Merrimac is a census-designated place (CDP) in Montgomery County, Virginia, United States. As of the 2020 census, Merrimac had a population of 2,858. It is part of the Blacksburg–Christiansburg Metropolitan Statistical Area which encompasses all of Montgomery County and the city of Radford.

== History ==
According to one source, Merrimac was so named because coal from area mines was used on CSS Virginia (formerly USS Merrimack). A post office called Merrimac Mines operated from 1904 until 1935.

The Linkous-Kipps House and Montgomery Primitive Baptist Church are listed on the National Register of Historic Places.

== Geography ==
Merrimac is located at 37°11′32″N 80°25′20″W (37.192257, −80.422247).

According to the United States Census Bureau, the CDP has a total area of 1.8 square miles (4.7 km^{2}), all land.

== Demographics ==
As of the census of 2000, there were 1,751 people, 889 households, and 353 families residing in the CDP. The population density was 963.5 people per square mile (371.5/km^{2}). There were 934 housing units at an average density of 513.9/sq mi (198.1/km^{2}). The racial makeup of the CDP was 94.35% White, 1.88% African American, 0.57% Native American, 1.94% Asian, 0.34% from other races, and 0.91% from two or more races. Hispanic or Latino of any race were 0.91% of the population.

There were 889 households, out of which 18.0% had children under the age of 18 living with them, 29.2% were married couples living together, 7.5% had a female householder with no husband present, and 60.2% were non-families. 53.7% of all households were made up of individuals, and 25.3% had someone living alone who was 65 years of age or older. The average household size was 1.82 and the average family size was 2.76.

In the CDP, the population was spread out, with 17.2% under the age of 18, 11.0% from 18 to 24, 28.0% from 25 to 44, 15.4% from 45 to 64, and 28.4% who were 65 years of age or older. The median age was 40 years. For every 100 females, there were 82.0 males. For every 100 females age 18 and over, there were 74.5 males.

The median income for a household in the CDP was $21,462, and the median income for a family was $40,800. Males had a median income of $31,223 versus $20,547 for females. The per capita income for the CDP was $16,634. About 12.4% of families and 16.5% of the population were below the poverty line, including 19.0% of those under age 18 and 12.0% of those age 65 or over.

== Climate ==
The climate in this area is characterized by hot, humid summers and generally mild to cool winters. According to the Köppen Climate Classification system, Merrimac has a humid subtropical climate, abbreviated "Cfa" on climate maps.
