= Havens Wildlife Management Area =

Protected area of Virginia, United States

- IUCN category V (protected landscape/seascape)
- Location within Virginia Location within the United States
- Location: Roanoke County, Virginia
- Nearest city: Salem
- Coordinates: 37°20′11″N 80°06′32″W
- Area: 7,190 acres (29.1 km^{2})
- Governing body: Virginia Department of Game and Inland Fisheries

Havens Wildlife Management Area is a 7,190-acre (29.1 km^{2}) Wildlife Management Area in Roanoke County, Virginia. Located in the Appalachian Highlands and occupying a part of Fort Lewis Mountain, it is steep and generally inaccessible; elevations in the area range from 1,500 to 3,200 feet (460 to 980 m) above sea level. Save for a few intermittent streams and watering holes created for wildlife, there is little water present; in addition, the area's soils are generally shallow and poor. The area was previously used for timber production, and today hosts a mixture of oaks, hickories, and pine.

Havens Wildlife Management Area is owned and maintained by the Virginia Department of Game and Inland Fisheries. The area is open to the public for hunting, trapping, hiking, horseback riding, and primitive camping. Access for persons 17 years of age or older requires a valid hunting or fishing permit, or a WMA access permit.

== See also ==
- List of Virginia Wildlife Management Areas
