= Childress, Montgomery County, Virginia =

Unincorporated community in Virginia, United States

Childress, Virginia
- Unincorporated community
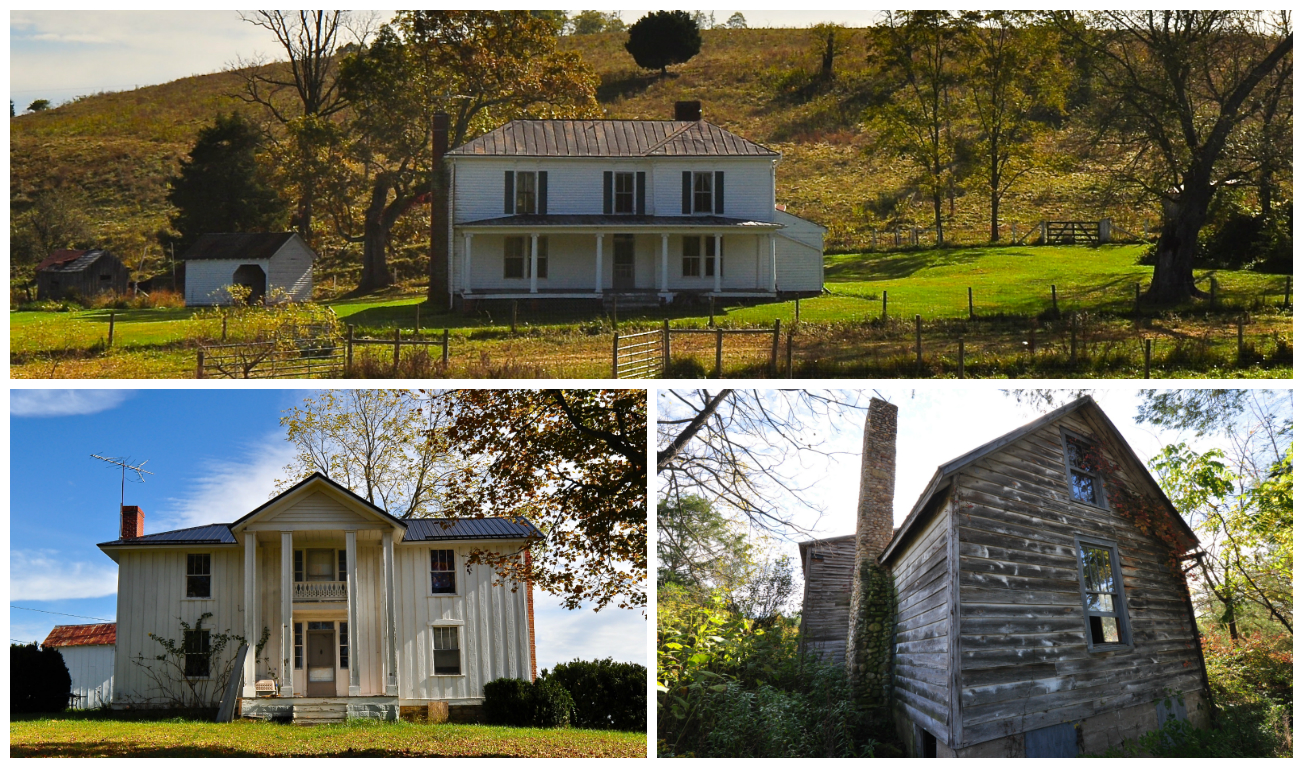
- National Register of Historic Places located near Childress, Virginia. Top: Bowyer-Trollinger Farm; Bottom L-R: Thomas Hall House and Cromer House.

- Location within Shenandoah Valley Location within Virginia Location within the United States
- Coordinates: 37°03′22″N 80°30′16″W
- Country: United States
- State: Virginia
- County: Montgomery
- Elevation: 1,946 ft (593 m)
- Time zone: UTC-5 (Eastern (EST))
  - Summer (DST): UTC-4 (EDT)
- Area code: 540
- GNIS feature ID: 1477201

Childress is an unincorporated community in Montgomery County, Virginia, United States. Childress is located on State Route 693, 7.3 miles (11.7 km) southwest of Christiansburg.

== History ==
Childress contained a post office from 1852 until 1952. The original name of the post office, Childress Store, honors three brothers named Childress who kept a store in the community.

The Bowyer-Trollinger Farm, Cromer House, and Thomas Hall House are listed on the National Register of Historic Places.
