= Belview, Virginia =

Belview
- CDP
- Location within the Commonwealth of Virginia
- Coordinates: 37°10′0″N 80°30′35″W
- Country: United States
- State: Virginia
- County: Montgomery
- Time zone: UTC−5 (Eastern (EST))
  - Summer (DST): UTC−4 (EDT)
- ZIP codes: 24141
- FIPS code: 51-06512
- GNIS feature ID: 2584807

Belview is a census-designated place in Montgomery County, Virginia, United States, just southeast of Radford Army Ammunition Plant. As of the 2020 census, Belview had a population of 1,128.

== Demographics ==
Historical population
Census	Pop.	Note	%±
2020	1,128		—
U.S. Decennial Census; 2010 2020

Belview was first listed as a census designated place in the 2010 U.S. census.
