= Ellett, Virginia =

Unincorporated community in Virginia, United States

- Unincorporated community
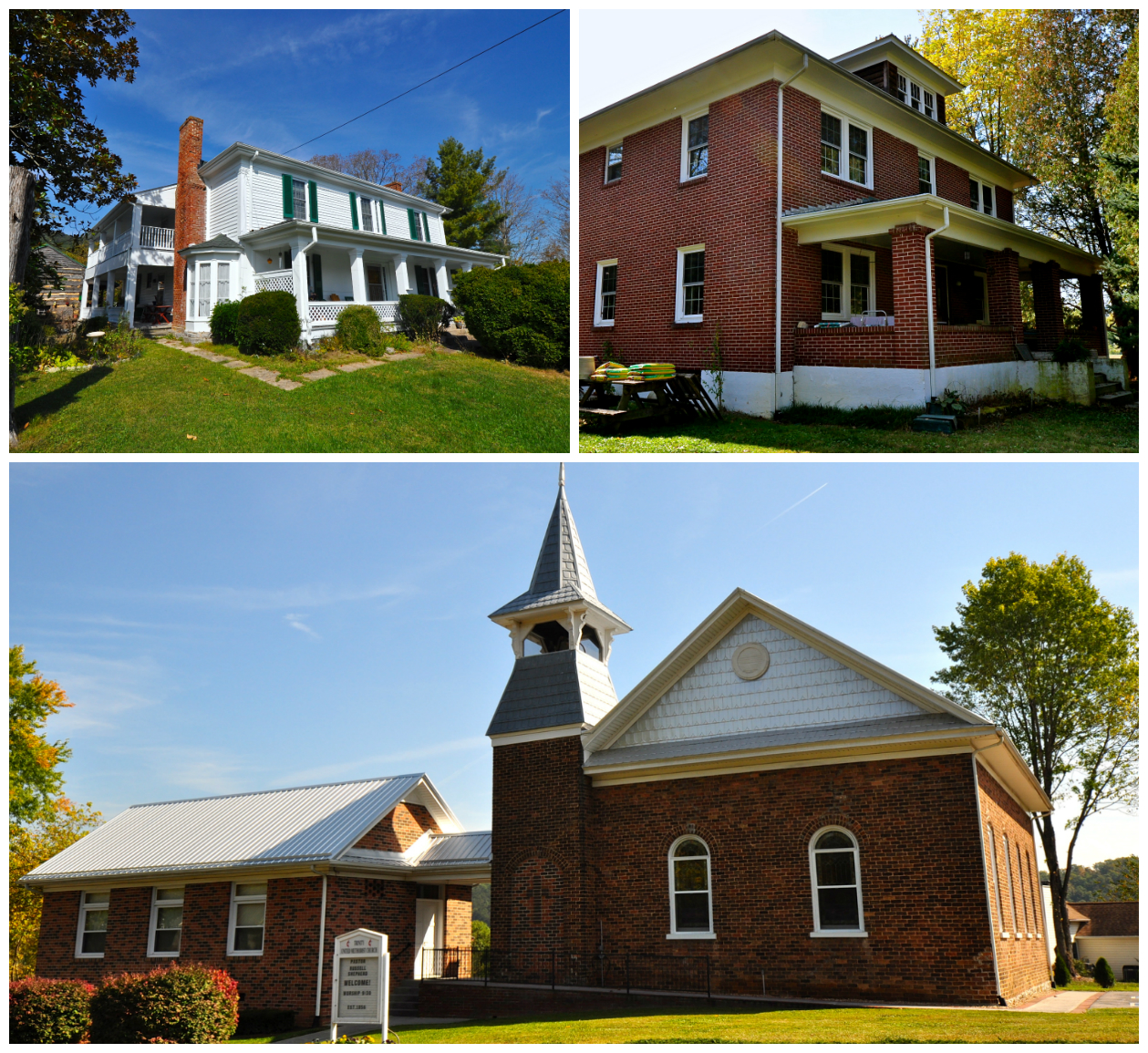
- National Register of Historic Places at Ellett, Virginia. Top: Earhart House and Blankenship Farm Bottom: Trinity United Methodist Church

- Location within Shenandoah Valley Location within Virginia Location within the United States
- Coordinates: 37°11′29″N 80°22′00″W
- Country: United States
- State: Virginia
- County: Montgomery
- Elevation: 1,522 ft (464 m)
- Time zone: UTC-5 (Eastern (EST))
  - Summer (DST): UTC-4 (EDT)
- Area code: 540
- GNIS feature ID: 1477300

Ellett is an unincorporated community in Montgomery County, Virginia, United States. Ellett is located at the junction of State Routes 603 and 723, 3.7 miles (6.0 km) southeast of Blacksburg.

A post office was established at Ellett in 1890, and remained in operation until being discontinued in 1910. The Blankenship Farm, Earhart House, and Trinity United Methodist Church are listed on the National Register of Historic Places.
