= Pilot, Virginia =

Unincorporated community in Virginia, United States

- Unincorporated community
- Location within Shenandoah Valley Location within Virginia Location within the United States
- Coordinates: 37°03′07″N 80°21′49″W
- Country: United States
- State: Virginia
- County: Montgomery
- Elevation: 2,274 ft (693 m)
- Time zone: UTC-5 (Eastern (EST))
  - Summer (DST): UTC-4 (EDT)
- ZIP code: 24138
- Area code: 540
- GNIS feature ID: 1472316

Pilot is an unincorporated community in Montgomery County, Virginia, United States. Pilot is 5.9 miles (9.5 km) south-southeast of Christiansburg. Pilot has a post office with ZIP code 24138.

The Guerrant House was listed on the National Register of Historic Places in 1989.

== Climate ==
The climate in this area is characterized by hot, humid summers and generally mild to cool winters. According to the Köppen Climate Classification system, Pilot has a humid subtropical climate, abbreviated "Cfa" on climate maps.
