= McCoy, Virginia =

Unincorporated community in Virginia, United States

- Unincorporated community
- Location within Shenandoah Valley Location within Virginia Location within the United States
- Coordinates: 37°13′01″N 80°35′52″W
- Country: United States
- State: Virginia
- County: Montgomery
- Elevation: 1,995 ft (608 m)
- Time zone: UTC-5 (Eastern (EST))
  - Summer (DST): UTC-4 (EDT)
- ZIP code: 24111
- Area code: 540
- GNIS feature ID: 1499720

McCoy is an unincorporated community in Montgomery County, Virginia, United States. McCoy is 10.2 miles (16.4 km) west of Blacksburg. McCoy has a post office with ZIP code 24111. The McCoy post office was established in 1906.

McCoy also has Long Shop-McCoy Volunteer Fire Department/Rescue Squad, that serves as a local community center; it is the area's voting location as well as the location for community functions.
