= McDonalds Mill, Virginia =

Unincorporated community in Virginia, United States

- Unincorporated community
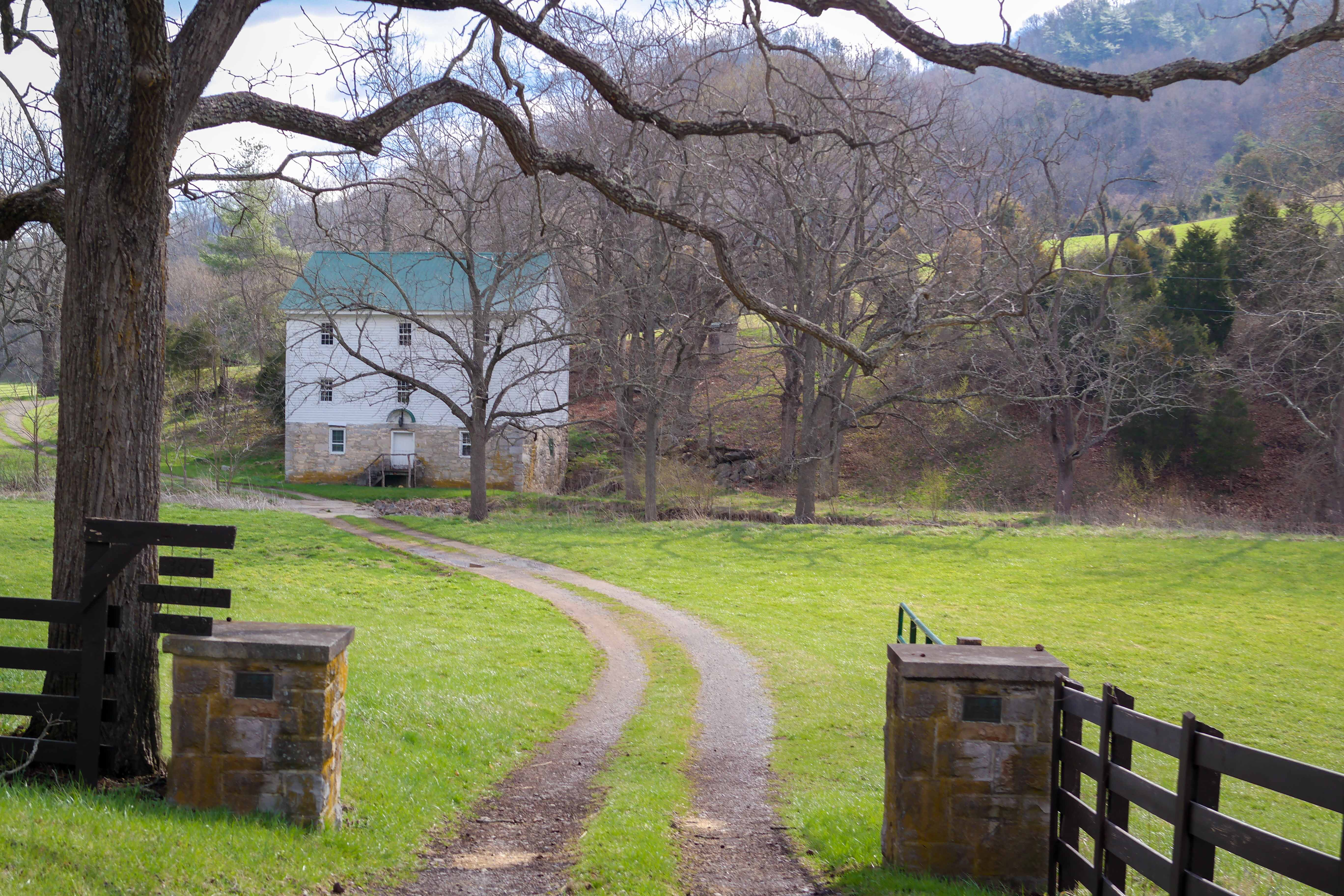
- Historic McDonalds Mill

- Location within Shenandoah Valley Location within Virginia Location within the United States
- Coordinates: 37°18′00″N 80°16′32″W
- Country: United States
- State: Virginia
- County: Montgomery

McDonalds Mill is an unincorporated community in the northeastern section of Montgomery County, Virginia, United States. Located approximately 10 miles east of Blacksburg, Virginia along State Route 785, McDonalds Mill lies at the floor of the Catawba Valley and is bordered on the south by Paris Mountain and to the north by Gallion Ridge.

== History ==
A post office called McDonalds Mills operated from 1847 until 1913. George McDonald operated a mill there, hence the name.
