= Prices Fork, Virginia =

Prices Fork
- Census-designated place (CDP)
- Location within Shenandoah Valley Location within Virginia Location within the United States
- Coordinates: 37°12′35″N 80°29′24″W
- Country: United States
- State: Virginia
- County: Montgomery

Population (2010)
  - Total: 1,066
- Time zone: UTC−5 (Eastern (EST))
  - Summer (DST): UTC−4 (EDT)

Prices Fork is a small traditionally agricultural census-designated place (CDP), in Montgomery County, Virginia, United States. As of the 2020 census, Prices Fork had a population of 1,142. It is located about three miles west of Blacksburg and the campus of Virginia Polytechnic Institute and State University (Virginia Tech).

The community is a part of the Blacksburg–Christiansburg metropolitan area which encompasses all of Montgomery County and the cities of Blacksburg, Christiansburg, and Radford for statistical purposes.

Prices Fork was named in honor of the local Price, or Preisch, family.

Prices Fork has one church (Prices Fork United Methodist Church), a Grange Hall and an elementary school (grades pre-K through 5th grade). Several structures in the community are designated as historical structures. The Prices Fork Historic District, Evans House No. 2, Joseph McDonald Farm, and Adam Wall House are listed on the National Register of Historic Places.

The old Prices Fork Elementary School has been renovated and now includes mixed-income apartments, a restaurant, a brewery and a shared-use kitchen.

== History ==
Prices Fork is within the area often referred to as the German New River Settlement, Before 1745, German immigrants moved from Pennsylvania and began settling in this region within the Prices Fork-Tom's Creek area near and along the horseshoe bottoms of the New River. They were among the earliest settlers of European descent in the western section of present-day Virginia. Prices Fork received its name from the Price (Preisch) family, early German settlers here, whose land bordered both sides of the road. Prices Fork evolved into a village during the mid-19th century. Portions of the community's buildings are within the Prices Fork Historic District on the National Register of Historic Places.

The Price Family Historical Society preserves records for members of the Price Family who have settled in the area.

== Demographics ==
Historical population
Census	Pop.	Note	%±
2010	1,066		—
2020	1,142		7.1%
U.S. Decennial Census; 2010 2020

Prices Fork was first listed as a census designated place in the 2010 U.S. census.

== See also ==
Prices Fork Village Plan
