= Montgomery County, Virginia =

County in Virginia, United States

- County
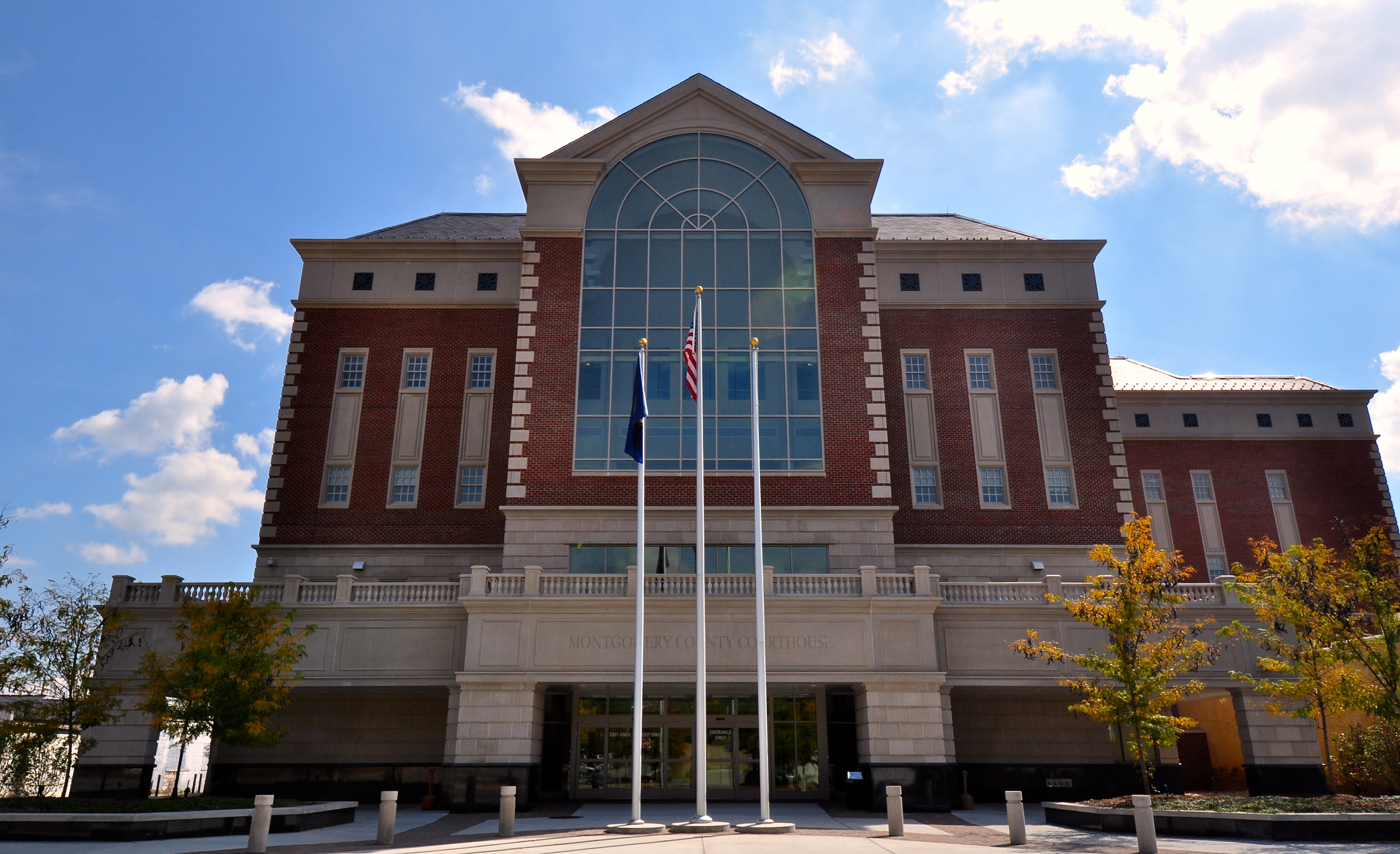
- Montgomery County Courthouse

- Seal
- Motto: Freedom Increases Responsibility
- Location within the U.S. state of Virginia
- Coordinates: 37°10′N 80°23′W
- Country: United States
- State: Virginia
- Founded: 1776
- Named for: Richard Montgomery
- Seat: Christiansburg
- Largest town: Blacksburg

Area
  - Total: 389 sq mi (1,010 km^{2})
  - Land: 387 sq mi (1,000 km^{2})
  - Water: 2.2 sq mi (5.7 km^{2}) 0.6%

Population (2020)
  - Total: 99,721
  - Estimate (2025): 98,434 ▼
  - Density: 256/sq mi (99/km^{2})
- Time zone: UTC−5 (Eastern)
  - Summer (DST): UTC−4 (EDT)
- Congressional district: 9th
- Website: www.montva.com

Montgomery County is a county located in the Valley and Ridge area of the U.S. state of Virginia. As population in the area increased, Montgomery County was formed in 1777 from Fincastle County, which in turn had been taken from Botetourt County. As of the 2020 United States census, the population was 99,721. Its county seat is Christiansburg, and Blacksburg is the largest town. Montgomery County is part of the Blacksburg-Christiansburg-Radford metropolitan area. It is dominated economically by the presence of Virginia Tech, Virginia's third largest public university, which is the county's largest employer.

== Board of Supervisors ==
The Montgomery County Board of Supervisors sets the annual budget and tax rates, enacts legislation governing the county and its citizens, sets policies and oversees their implementation. There are seven supervisors; one is elected from each of the seven geographic districts. Terms are four years; three or four seats are up for re-election each odd year.

Supervisor	District
Sara Bohn	A
Derek Kitts	B
Steve Fijalkowski	C
Todd King	D
Anthony Grafsky	E
Mary Biggs	F
April DeMotts	G

== History ==
Montgomery County was established on December 31, 1776, made from parts of Fincastle County, which was disbanded at this time and split into Montgomery, Washington, and Kentucky counties. Later, Montgomery lost land to form counties which now border it, including some counties which later formed West Virginia.

The county is named for Richard Montgomery, an American Revolutionary War general killed in 1775 while attempting to capture Quebec City, Canada.

== Geography ==
According to the U.S. Census Bureau, the county has a total area of 389 square miles (1,010 km^{2}), of which 387 square miles (1,000 km^{2}) is land and 2.2 square miles (5.7 km^{2}) (0.6%) is water. The western part of the county is in the New River watershed. Montgomery County is one of the 423 counties served by the Appalachian Regional Commission, and it is identified as part of "Greater Appalachia" by Colin Woodard in his book American Nations: A History of the Eleven Rival Regional Cultures of North America.

=== Adjacent counties and city ===
- Craig County - Northeast
- Giles County - Northwest
- City of Radford - West
- Pulaski County - Southwest
- Floyd County - South
- Roanoke County - East

=== National protected area ===
- Jefferson National Forest (part)

=== Major highways ===
- Future I-73
- I-81
- US 11
- US 460
- SR 8
- SR 111
- SR 114
- SR 177
- SR 232
- SR 314
- SR 412

=== U.S. Bicycle Route ===
- USBR 76 enters Montgomery County from Radford and crosses the county for 27.9 miles to Roanoke County

== Demographics ==
Historical population
Census	Pop.	Note	%±
1790	13,228		—
1800	9,044		−31.6%
1810	8,409		−7.0%
1820	8,733		3.9%
1830	12,306		40.9%
1840	7,405		−39.8%
1850	8,359		12.9%
1860	10,617		27.0%
1870	12,556		18.3%
1880	16,693		32.9%
1890	17,742		6.3%
1900	15,852		−10.7%
1910	17,268		8.9%
1920	18,595		7.7%
1930	19,605		5.4%
1940	21,206		8.2%
1950	29,780		40.4%
1960	32,923		10.6%
1970	47,157		43.2%
1980	63,516		34.7%
1990	73,913		16.4%
2000	83,629		13.1%
2010	94,392		12.9%
2020	99,721		5.6%
2025 (est.)	98,434	▼	−1.3%
U.S. Decennial Census; 1790-1960 1900-1990; 1990-2000 2010-2015 2020

=== Racial and ethnic composition ===
Montgomery County, Virginia – Racial and ethnic composition Note: the US Census treats Hispanic/Latino as an ethnic category. This table excludes Latinos from the racial categories and assigns them to a separate category. Hispanics/Latinos may be of any race.
Race / Ethnicity (NH = Non-Hispanic)	Pop 1980	Pop 1990	Pop 2000	Pop 2010	Pop 2020	% 1980	% 1990	% 2000	% 2010	% 2020
White alone (NH)	60,107	67,431	74,519	81,091	77,918	94.63%	91.23%	89.11%	85.91%	78.14%
Black or African American alone (NH)	1,886	2,800	2,996	3,631	4,054	2.97%	3.79%	3.58%	3.85%	4.07%
Native American or Alaska Native alone (NH)	73	63	141	154	126	0.11%	0.09%	0.17%	0.16%	0.13%
Asian alone (NH)	711	2,788	3,296	5,089	8,310	1.12%	3.77%	3.94%	5.39%	8.33%
Native Hawaiian or Pacific Islander alone (NH)	x	x	29	21	45	x	x	0.03%	0.02%	0.05%
Other race alone (NH)	228	38	125	117	307	0.36%	0.05%	0.15%	0.12%	0.31%
Mixed race or Multiracial (NH)	x	x	1,202	1,753	4,310	x	x	1.44%	1.86%	4.32%
Hispanic or Latino (any race)	511	793	1,321	2,536	4,651	0.80%	1.07%	1.58%	2.69%	4.66%
Total	63,516	73,913	83,629	94,392	99,721	100.00%	100.00%	100.00%	100.00%	100.00%

=== 2020 census ===
As of the 2020 census, the county had a population of 99,721. The median age was 27.5 years. 16.2% of residents were under the age of 18 and 12.7% of residents were 65 years of age or older. For every 100 females there were 106.4 males, and for every 100 females age 18 and over there were 106.4 males age 18 and over.

The racial makeup of the county was 79.7% White, 4.2% Black or African American, 0.2% American Indian and Alaska Native, 8.4% Asian, 0.1% Native Hawaiian and Pacific Islander, 1.6% from some other race, and 5.9% from two or more races. Hispanic or Latino residents of any race comprised 4.7% of the population.

73.9% of residents lived in urban areas, while 26.1% lived in rural areas.

There were 38,026 households in the county, of which 23.3% had children under the age of 18 living with them and 27.9% had a female householder with no spouse or partner present. About 29.3% of all households were made up of individuals and 8.5% had someone living alone who was 65 years of age or older.

There were 41,134 housing units, of which 7.6% were vacant. Among occupied housing units, 51.6% were owner-occupied and 48.4% were renter-occupied. The homeowner vacancy rate was 1.2% and the rental vacancy rate was 4.6%.

=== 2010 Census ===
As of the 2010 United States census, there were 94,392 people living in the county. 87.6% were White, 5.4% Asian, 3.9% Black or African American, 0.2% Native American, 0.8% of some other race and 2.1% of two or more races. 2.7% were Hispanic or Latino (of any race).

=== 2000 Census ===
As of the 2000 United States census, there were 83,629 people, 30,997 households, and 17,203 families living in the county. The population density was 215 people per square mile (83 people/km^{2}). There were 32,527 housing units at an average density of 84 per square mile (32/km^{2}). The racial makeup of the county was 90.00% White, 3.97% Asian, 3.65% Black or African American, 0.18% Native American, 0.04% Pacific Islander, 0.63% from other races, and 1.53% from two or more races. 1.58% of the population were Hispanic or Latino of any race.

There were 30,997 households, out of which 25.30% had children under the age of 18 living with them, 44.80% were married couples living together, 7.60% had a female householder with no husband present, and 44.50% were non-families. 25.50% of all households were made up of individuals, and 6.60% had someone living alone who was 65 years of age or older. The average household size was 2.40 and the average family size was 2.87.

In the county, the population was spread out, with 17.10% under the age of 18, 31.30% from 18 to 24, 25.60% from 25 to 44, 17.30% from 45 to 64, and 8.60% who were 65 years of age or older. The median age was 26 years. For every 100 females, there were 110.00 males. For every 100 females aged 18 and over, there were 110.90 males.

The median income for a household in the county was $32,330, and the median income for a family was $47,239. Males had a median income of $33,674 versus $23,555 for females. The per capita income for the county was $17,077. About 8.80% of families and 23.20% of the population were below the poverty line, including 14.60% of those under age 18 and 8.80% of those age 65 or over.

== Politics ==
Despite being in the Solid South, Montgomery County did not consistently back Democratic candidates in the 20th century, being consistently Republican due to Unionist sentiment in the area during the Civil War, though the presence of a major university in Virginia Tech helped make the county more competitive to the Democratic Party towards the end of that streak.

It was a bellwether county, backing the national winner in every election from 1980 to 2008. In 2012, the county backed the losing candidate by a very narrow margin of 103 votes. It voted against Republican Donald Trump in all three of his runs.

United States presidential election results for Montgomery County, Virginia
Year	Republican		Democratic		Third party(ies)	
Year	No.	%	No.	%	No.	%
1880	601	31.08%	1,323	68.41%	10	0.52%
1884	1,308	47.86%	1,416	51.81%	9	0.33%
1888	1,516	50.55%	1,335	44.51%	148	4.93%
1892	1,128	40.53%	1,286	46.21%	369	13.26%
1896	1,594	53.51%	1,317	44.21%	68	2.28%
1900	1,391	53.75%	1,102	42.58%	95	3.67%
1904	725	51.16%	650	45.87%	42	2.96%
1908	795	51.39%	734	47.45%	18	1.16%
1912	349	21.87%	684	42.86%	563	35.28%
1916	891	53.45%	765	45.89%	11	0.66%
1920	1,160	53.78%	969	44.92%	28	1.30%
1924	964	44.44%	1,142	52.65%	63	2.90%
1928	1,861	65.81%	967	34.19%	0	0.00%
1932	1,522	44.70%	1,805	53.01%	78	2.29%
1936	1,852	49.88%	1,832	49.34%	29	0.78%
1940	1,890	46.38%	2,168	53.20%	17	0.42%
1944	1,936	53.67%	1,652	45.80%	19	0.53%
1948	2,070	59.60%	1,126	32.42%	277	7.98%
1952	3,881	70.68%	1,600	29.14%	10	0.18%
1956	4,598	70.10%	1,848	28.18%	113	1.72%
1960	4,270	66.25%	2,157	33.47%	18	0.28%
1964	4,604	54.23%	3,872	45.61%	13	0.15%
1968	7,098	61.47%	2,700	23.38%	1,749	15.15%
1972	9,348	70.56%	3,692	27.87%	208	1.57%
1976	7,971	50.64%	7,539	47.89%	232	1.47%
1980	8,222	47.41%	7,455	42.98%	1,667	9.61%
1984	12,428	62.88%	7,202	36.44%	135	0.68%
1988	12,326	57.48%	8,909	41.55%	209	0.97%
1992	10,606	42.53%	10,658	42.74%	3,671	14.72%
1996	10,517	43.28%	10,867	44.72%	2,914	11.99%
2000	13,991	51.51%	11,720	43.15%	1,449	5.34%
2004	17,070	54.16%	14,128	44.83%	317	1.01%
2008	19,028	46.81%	21,031	51.73%	594	1.46%
2012	20,006	48.78%	19,903	48.53%	1,100	2.68%
2016	19,459	45.22%	20,021	46.53%	3,551	8.25%
2020	20,629	45.80%	23,218	51.55%	1,190	2.64%
2024	22,179	47.14%	23,811	50.60%	1,063	2.26%

== Climate ==
Climate data for Blacksburg
Month	Jan	Feb	Mar	Apr	May	Jun	Jul	Aug	Sep	Oct	Nov	Dec	Year
Mean daily maximum °F (°C)	42 (6)	45 (7)	53 (12)	63 (17)	71 (22)	79 (26)	82 (28)	81 (27)	75 (24)	65 (18)	56 (13)	44 (7)	63 (17)
Mean daily minimum °F (°C)	21 (−6)	24 (−4)	30 (−1)	38 (3)	47 (8)	56 (13)	60 (16)	59 (15)	51 (11)	39 (4)	31 (−1)	24 (−4)	40 (5)
Average precipitation inches (mm)	3.08 (78)	2.81 (71)	3.64 (92)	3.48 (88)	4.33 (110)	4.00 (102)	4.26 (108)	3.59 (91)	3.10 (79)	2.78 (71)	2.87 (73)	2.95 (75)	40.89 (1,038)
Source: U.S. Climate Data

== Education ==
=== Colleges and universities ===
- Virginia Polytechnic Institute and State University (Virginia Tech)
- Via College of Osteopathic Medicine
- New River Community College
- Virginia-Maryland College of Veterinary Medicine

=== Public High schools ===
Montgomery County Public Schools:

- Auburn High School
- Blacksburg High School
- Christiansburg High School
- Eastern Montgomery High School

=== Private High schools ===
- Dayspring Christian Academy

== Communities ==
=== Towns ===
- Blacksburg
- Christiansburg

=== Census-designated places ===
- Belview
- Elliston
- Lafayette
- Merrimac
- Plum Creek
- Prices Fork
- Riner
- Shawsville

=== Other unincorporated communities ===
- Alleghany Springs
- Bradshaw
- Belmont
- Childress
- Ellett
- Graysontown
- Ironto
- Long Shop
- Lusters Gate
- McCoy
- McDonalds Mill
- New Ellett
- Pilot
- Rogers
- Sowers
- Sugar Grove
- Toms Creek
- Vicker
- Walton
- Yellow Sulphur Springs

== See also ==
- National Register of Historic Places listings in Montgomery County, Virginia
