= Leonhard Haeger =

American architect

Leonhard Haeger (1867–1977) was an architect in the United States. He designed buildings in St. Louis, Missouri including industrial structures, schools, and churches. He designed the Alligator Oil Clothing buildings and former Pevely Dairy Company Plant buildings. Both were listed on the National Register of Historic Places.

The Alligator Oil Cloth building is at 4153-71 Bingham Avenue in St. Louis (National Register of Historic Places listings in St. Louis south and west of downtown). The company's buildings were listed on the National Register in 2013. They are in the Bevo neighborhood at 4153-7 Bingham Avenue. The two main buildings were designed by Haege. He also designed the Pevely Dairy plant which also remains standing. They are a four-story reinforced concrete factory building built in 1918 and a two-story reinforced concrete office and factory building built in 1919.

He studied at Manual Training School, Smith. Academy, and the St. Louis School of Fine Arts. He married and had two sons. His son Leonard also became an architect.

In 1907 he designed one of the first houses in Westminster.

== Work ==
- Alligator Oil Clothing Company Building at 4153-71 Bingham Ave. St. Louis (Independent City), Missouri, NRHP listed
- Pevely Dairy Company Buildings at 3301 and 3305 Park Avenue in St. Louis
- Pevely Dairy Company Plant at 1001 S. Grand, 3626 Chouteau, 1101 Motard in St. Louis NRHP listed
- 3207-11 S. Grand, "referencing" building to its north built four years earlier
- Church at 4700 South Grand (1931)

== See also ==
- Architecture of St. Louis
- National Register of Historic Places listings in St. Louis south and west of downtown
- Tower Grove Heights Historic District
