= Frank Arnold =

Frank Arnold may refer to:

- Frank Arnold (basketball) (1934–2024), American basketball coach
- Frank Arnold (director) (born 1938), Australian television director
- Frank Arnold (footballer) (1877–1943), Australian rules footballer
- Frank Arnold (umpire) (1851–1929), American baseball umpire
- Frank B. Arnold (1839–1890), New York politician
- Frank D. Arnold, United States Ambassador to El Salvador
- Frank W. Arnold (1851–1917), American trade union functionary
- Frank Arnold (architect), American architect with many works in Forest Park Southeast Historic District of St. Louis, Missouri

== See also ==
- Francis Arnold (disambiguation)
