= Lafayette Historic District =

Lafayette Historic District may refer to:

- Lafayette Historic District (Denver, Colorado), listed on the National Register of Historic Places in Denver County, Colorado
- Lafayette Square Historic District (St. Louis, Missouri), listed on the National Register of Historic Places in St. Louis County, Missouri
- Lafayette Historic District (Lafayette, Virginia), listed on the National Register of Historic Places in Montgomery County, Virginia
- Lafayette Square Historic District (Washington, D.C.), listed on the National Register of Historic Places in Washington, D.C.
