= Lafayette Square Historic District =

Lafayette Square Historic District may refer to:

- Lafayette Square Historic District (St. Louis, Missouri), listed on the NRHP in Missouri
- Lafayette Square Historic District (Washington, D.C.), listed on the NRHP in Washington, D.C.
