= Lafayette, Virginia =

Census-designated place in Virginia, US

Coordinates: 37°14′10″N 80°12′41″W

Lafayette is a census-designated place (CDP) between the cities of Roanoke and Christiansburg in eastern Montgomery County, southwest Virginia, United States. As of the 2020 census, Lafayette had a population of 429. It is located adjacent to Elliston, at the confluence of the North and South Forks of the Roanoke River.

The Lafayette Historic District was listed on the National Register of Historic Places in 1991.

== Climate ==
The climate in this area is characterized by hot, humid summers and generally mild to cool winters. According to the Köppen Climate Classification system, Lafayette has a humid subtropical climate, abbreviated "Cfa" on climate maps.

== Demographics ==
Historical population
Census	Pop.	Note	%±
2010	449		—
2020	429		−4.5%
U.S. Decennial Census; 2010 2020

Lafayette was first listed as a census designated place in the 2010 U.S. census formed from part of the deleted Elliston-Lafayette CDP and additional area.
