= William Buehler House =

Historic residence in St. Louis

- U.S. National Register of Historic Places
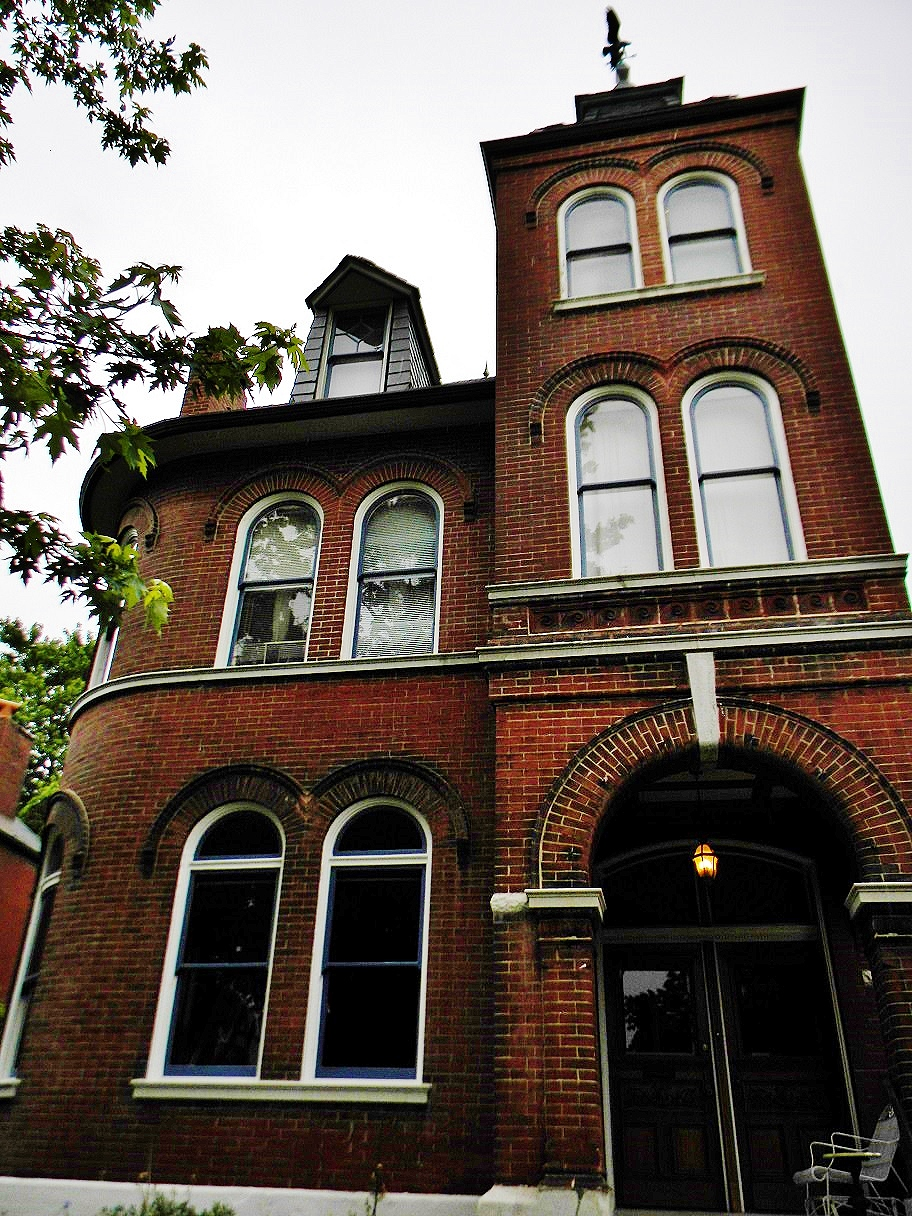

- Location within Missouri
- Location: 2610 Tennessee Ave., St. Louis, Missouri
- Coordinates: 38°36′32″N 90°14′16″W
- Area: less than one acre
- Built: 1894
- Built by: Schneider, P. and Company
- Architect: Lemm, Herman
- Architectural style: Romanesque
- NRHP reference No.: 00001550
- Added to NRHP: December 28, 2000

William Buehler House is a property in St. Louis, Missouri, United States. It is listed on the National Register of Historic Places. It is at 2610 Tennessee Avenue. The Richardsonian Romanesque red brick home was built from 1894-1896. It has a two-story carriage house at its rear. It was added to the National Register of Historic Places in November 2000.

It was designed by Herman Lemm and built by P. Schneider and Company. The house is significant locally for its architecture and is a rare Richardsonian Romanesque house in a neighborhood whose large homes are Italianate, Queen Anne, and Dutch Colonial style. The three-story house is prominent in the Tower Grove East neighborhood and illustrates the development patterns of St. Louis southwest of downtown. Frank Brockel lived in the house before he served in World War I.

== See also ==
- National Register of Historic Places listings in St. Louis south and west of downtown
