= National Register of Historic Places listings in St. Louis south and west of downtown =

This is a list of properties and historic districts on the National Register of Historic Places within the city limits of St. Louis, Missouri, south of Interstate 64 and west of Downtown St. Louis. For listings in Downtown St. Louis, see National Register of Historic Places listings in Downtown and Downtown West St. Louis. For those north of I-64 and west of downtown, see National Register of Historic Places listings in St. Louis north and west of downtown. For listings in St. Louis County and outside the city limits of St. Louis, see National Register of Historic Places listings in St. Louis County, Missouri.

== Current listings ==
	Name on the Register	Image	Date listed	Location	Description
1	138th Infantry Missouri National Guard Armory	138th Infantry Missouri National Guard Armory	January 31, 2017 (#100000609)	3660 Market St. 38°37′53″N 90°14′16″W	
2	Alligator Oil Clothing Company Building	Alligator Oil Clothing Company Building	January 29, 2013 (#12001243)	4153–71 Bingham Ave. 38°35′18″N 90°15′39″W	
3	American Furnace Company	American Furnace Company	February 2, 2016 (#15001019)	1300 Hampton Ave. 38°37′36″N 90°17′16″W	
4	Anheuser-Busch Brewery	Anheuser-Busch Brewery	November 13, 1966 (#66000945)	721 Pestalozzi St. 38°35′51″N 90°12′44″W	
5	B'nai El Temple	B'nai El Temple	July 21, 1983 (#83001042)	3666 Flad Ave. 38°36′41″N 90°14′35″W	One of the congregation's historic synagogue buildings
6	Barr Branch Library Historic District	Barr Branch Library Historic District	September 2, 1982 (#82004731)	2500–2630 Lafayette Ave. 38°36′54″N 90°13′16″W	
7	Benton Park District	Benton Park District	December 30, 1985 (#85003232)	Bounded by Gravois Ave., Interstate 55, S. Broadway, and Jefferson St. 38°35′52″N 90°13′09″W	
8	Bevo Mill Commercial Historic District	Bevo Mill Commercial Historic District	July 31, 2013 (#13000568)	4648–5003 Gravois Ave., 4719–4767 Morganford Rd. 38°34′54″N 90°16′01″W	
9	Brahm-Mitchellette Motor Car Company	Brahm-Mitchellette Motor Car Company	July 21, 2015 (#15000442)	3537 S. Kingshighway Blvd. 38°35′41″N 90°16′17″W	Auto dealership building
10	Brown Shoe Company's Homes-Take Factory	Brown Shoe Company's Homes-Take Factory	October 20, 1980 (#80004503)	1201 Russell Boulevard; 38°36′29″N 90°12′36″W	Built in 1904 by St. Louis architects Weber and Groves (Albert B. Groves), the Brown Shoe Company owned and operated the facility until the 1930s. The International Hat Company converted the building into a warehouse in 1954, until selling the property in 1976. In 1980, the building was converted into 100 apartments for assisted senior living.
11	William Buehler House	William Buehler House	December 28, 2000 (#00001550)	2610 Tennessee Ave. 38°36′32″N 90°14′16″W	Prominent Richardsonian Romanesque house within Tower Grove East
12	Buildings at 2327–31 and 2333–35 Rutger Street	Buildings at 2327–31 and 2333–35 Rutger Street	January 19, 1984 (#84002620)	2327–31 and 2333–35 Rutger St. 38°37′09″N 90°13′07″W	
13	Burgherr's Service Station	Burgherr's Service Station	October 2, 2017 (#100001690)	1956 Utah St. 38°35′40″N 90°13′13″W	
14	Carlin-Rathgeber House	Carlin-Rathgeber House	May 29, 1980 (#80004554)	122 E. Davis St. 38°32′36″N 90°15′47″W	part of the Carondelet, East of Broadway, St. Louis Multiple Resource Area (MRA)
15	Carondelet School	Carondelet School	March 21, 2007 (#07000171)	8221 Minnesota; 38°32′48″N 90°15′50″W	
16	Central Carondelet Historic District	Central Carondelet Historic District	February 22, 2006 (#06000064)	Roughly bounded by Koeln Ave., Loughborough Ave., S. Broadway and Alabama Ave.; also roughly bounded by Loughborough Ave., Holly Hills Ave., Idaho Ave., and S. Broadway; also bounded by Iron St., Minnesota Ave., Pennsylvania Ave., and Holly Hills Ave.; also roughly bounded by Bates St. on the north, Interstate 55 on the west, S. Broadway on the east, and Holly Hills Ave. on the south; also roughly bounded by S. Broadway, Pennsylvania Ave., Interstate 55, Bates St., and Delor St. 38°33′14″N 90°15′27″W	Additional sets of boundaries represent boundary increases of December 20, 2007, February 18, 2009, January 25, 2010, and July 14, 2011
17	Central Institute for the Deaf Clinic and Research Building	Central Institute for the Deaf Clinic and Research Building	October 21, 2004 (#04001163)	909 S. Taylor Ave. 38°37′52″N 90°15′44″W	
18	Chatillon-DeMenil House	Chatillon-DeMenil House	June 9, 1978 (#78001673)	3352 DeMenil Pl. 38°35′32″N 90°12′57″W	
19	Chippewa Trust Company Building	Chippewa Trust Company Building	August 12, 2010 (#10000538)	3801-05 S. Broadway; 38°35′09″N 90°13′40″W	part of the South St. Louis Historic Working and Middle Class Streetcar Suburbs Multiple Property Submission (MPS)
20	Chouteau Building	Chouteau Building	April 5, 2006 (#06000220)	4030 Chouteau (also 1029 S. Vandeventer); 38°37′46″N 90°14′57″W	
21	City Hospital Historic District	City Hospital Historic District	February 2, 2001 (#01000036)	Roughly bounded by Lafayette Ave., Grattan St., Carroll St., Dillon St., St. Ange St., 14th St., and Carroll St. 38°36′50″N 90°12′28″W	
22	Coca-Cola Syrup Plant	Coca-Cola Syrup Plant	April 30, 2008 (#08000359)	8125 Michigan Ave. 38°32′45″N 90°15′57″W	Now known as the Temtor Lofts
23	Columbia Oil Company	Columbia Oil Company	June 3, 2019 (#100004006)	3419 Papin St. 38°37′35″N 90°13′59″W	
24	Compton Hill Water Tower	Compton Hill Water Tower	September 29, 1972 (#72001555)	Reservoir Park, Grant and Russell Boulevards, and Lafayette Ave. 38°36′51″N 90°14′19″W	
25	Convent of the Sisters of St. Joseph Carondelet	Convent of the Sisters of St. Joseph Carondelet	February 28, 1980 (#80004505)	6400 Minnesota Ave. 38°33′23″N 90°15′00″W	
26	Crittenden Historic District	Crittenden Historic District	July 7, 1983 (#83001044)	3401 Arsenal, 3400 and 3500 blocks of Crittenden; 38°36′12″N 90°14′24″W	
27	Delaney School	Delaney School	December 23, 2004 (#04001385)	6138 Virginia Ave. 38°33′44″N 90°15′00″W	A St. Louis Public School designed by William B. Ittner MPS
28	Des Peres School	Des Peres School	September 2, 1982 (#82004735)	6307 Michigan Ave. 38°33′32″N 90°15′00″W	
29	Dickmann Building	Dickmann Building	December 30, 1999 (#99001616)	3115 S. Grand Boulevard; 38°36′08″N 90°14′33″W	
30	Dolman Row	Dolman Row	January 19, 1984 (#84002629)	1424–1434 Dolman St. 38°36′56″N 90°12′36″W	
31	Du-Good Chemical Laboratory Building	Du-Good Chemical Laboratory Building	April 24, 2017 (#100000911)	1215–23 S. Jefferson Ave. 38°37′12″N 90°13′10″W	
32	Dutchtown South Historic District	Dutchtown South Historic District	September 1, 2015 (#15000555)	Bounded by S. Grand Blvd., Delor & Liberty Sts., Alabama, Virginia & Bingham Aves. 38°34′29″N 90°14′44″W	
33	Famous-Barr Warehouse	Famous-Barr Warehouse	June 28, 2023 (#100009099)	3728 Market St. 38°37′56″N 90°14′21″W	
34	Rose Fanning Elementary School	Rose Fanning Elementary School	January 12, 2022 (#100007353)	3417 Grace Ave. 38°35′45″N 90°14′41″W	
35	Forest Park Southeast Historic District	Forest Park Southeast Historic District	December 20, 2001 (#01001360)	Roughly bounded by Chouteau Ave., Manchester and Cadet Aves., Kingshighway Boulevard, and S. Sarah St.; also 4170–4370 and 4229–4341 Manchester Ave.; also 4121–25, 4127–29, 4131, 4133, 4137, 4139–41, 4143, 4145, 4501–07, 4509–11, 4510, and 4512–14 Manchester Ave.; also 4100–4162 and 4151–4201 Manchester, and 4216 Gibson; also portions of Boyle, Chouteau, Kentucky, Norfolk, Swawn, Talmadge, Tower Grove, Vandeventer, and Vista; 38°37′43″N 90°15′33″W	Additional sets of boundaries represent boundary increases of June 16, 2005, February 7, 2007, August 5, 2009, and December 19, 2012
36	Grand-Bates Suburb Historic District	Grand-Bates Suburb Historic District	September 16, 2009 (#09000719)	Roughly bounded by Bates St., Grand Boulevard, Interstate 55, Alaska Ave., and Fillmore and Iron Sts. 38°33′53″N 90°15′08″W	
37	Grand-Dover Park Historic District	Grand-Dover Park Historic District	December 15, 2015 (#15000896)	Bounded by S. Grand Blvd., Bates St. & alleys W. of Dewey Ave. & S. of Bowen St. 38°34′03″N 90°15′31″W	
38	Grant School	Grant School	February 14, 2006 (#06000037)	3009 Pennsylvania Ave. 38°36′07″N 90°13′55″W	
39	Gratiot School	Gratiot School	April 19, 2016 (#16000184)	1615 Hampton Ave. 38°37′22″N 90°17′20″W	
40	Gravois-Jefferson Streetcar Suburb Historic District	Gravois-Jefferson Streetcar Suburb Historic District	May 11, 2005 (#05000115)	Gravois and S. Jefferson, S. Jefferson and S. Broadway, Meramac, S. Gran and Gravois; also 2644–54 Gravois Ave. 38°35′28″N 90°14′03″W	part of the South St. Louis Historic Working and Middle Class Streetcar Suburbs MPS; second set of addresses represents a boundary increase July 15, 2016
41	C. Hager and Sons Hinge Co.	C. Hager and Sons Hinge Co.	February 26, 1987 (#87000508)	139 Victor St. 38°35′58″N 90°12′04″W	
42	Hamiltonian Federal Savings and Loan Association Building	Hamiltonian Federal Savings and Loan Association Building	January 14, 2014 (#13001088)	3150 S. Grand Blvd. 38°36′04″N 90°14′32″W	
43	Harris Teachers College	Harris Teachers College	August 4, 2004 (#04000787)	1517 South Theresa; 38°37′19″N 90°14′13″W	part of the St. Louis Public Schools of William B. Ittner MPS
44	Hickory Street District	Hickory Street District	January 18, 1985 (#85000107)	Bounded roughly by Lasalle, Missouri, Rutger, and Jefferson Sts., and along Hickory St. 38°37′12″N 90°13′03″W	
45	Holly Hills Historic District	Holly Hills Historic District	March 22, 2016 (#16000102)	Bounded by Holly Hills Blvd., MPRR, alley N. of Dover Pl., Leona St. & Ray Ave. 38°34′06″N 90°16′04″W	
46	The Home of the Friendless	The Home of the Friendless	November 9, 2015 (#15000773)	4431 S. Broadway; 38°34′30″N 90°14′07″W	
47	IBEW Building	IBEW Building	June 17, 2019 (#100004062)	5850 Elizabeth Ave. 38°36′53″N 90°17′17″W	
48	Immaculate Conception Church and Rectory	Immaculate Conception Church and Rectory	February 19, 2008 (#08000031)	3120 Lafayette Ave. 38°37′04″N 90°14′32″W	
49	Immaculate Conception School	Immaculate Conception School	May 8, 1985 (#85000995)	2912 Lafayette; 38°36′55″N 90°13′41″W	
50	Jefferson Barracks VA Hospital	Jefferson Barracks VA Hospital	July 14, 2015 (#15000419)	1 Jefferson Barracks Dr. 38°29′38″N 90°16′58″W	
51	Kingshighway Hills Commercial District	Kingshighway Hills Commercial District	July 20, 2020 (#100005349)	3701–3835 South Kingshighway Blvd. 38°35′32″N 90°16′22″W	
52	Koken Barbers' Supply Co. Historic District	Koken Barbers' Supply Co. Historic District	February 7, 2007 (#07000023)	Bounded by Ohio, Sidney and Victor Sts., and alley east of Texas Ave. (2500 Ohio Ave). 38°36′28″N 90°13′28″W	As of 2012, part of the St. Francis de Sales Historic District.
53	Laclede Gas Light Company Pumping Station G	Laclede Gas Light Company Pumping Station G	February 8, 2007 (#07000020)	4401 Chouteau Ave. 38°37′49″N 90°15′31″W	
54	Lafayette Garage and Repair Company Building	Lafayette Garage and Repair Company Building	October 13, 2011 (#11000737)	2710–2716 Lafayette; 38°36′54″N 90°13′26″W	part of the Auto-Related Resources of St. Louis, Missouri MPS
55	Lafayette Square Historic District	Lafayette Square Historic District	June 28, 1972 (#72001557)	Roughly bounded by Hickory and 18th Sts., Jefferson and Lafayette Aves.; also roughly bounded by Chouteau Ave., Dolman, Lafayette Ave., S. 18th St., Vail Pl., and McKay Pl. 38°37′00″N 90°12′55″W	Second set of boundaries represents a boundary increase of July 24, 1986
56	Lambskin Temple	Lambskin Temple	August 12, 1987 (#87001361)	1054 S. Kingshighway Boulevard; 38°37′47″N 90°15′49″W	Art Deco Masonic building designed by Edward F. Nolte, of German descent, incorporating aspects of Germany's Art Nouveau Movement. Also known as Lambskin Masonic Temple.
57	LeGear Medicine Company Building		April 1, 2024 (#100009690)	4155 Beck Avenue; 38°35′29″N 90°15′35″W	
58	Liggett & Myers Historic District	Liggett & Myers Historic District	June 18, 2009 (#09000441)	Roughly bounded by Vandeventer, Park, Thurman, and Lafayette Aves. 38°37′12″N 90°15′12″W	
59	Lindenwood School	Lindenwood School	May 6, 2005 (#05000371)	3815 McCausland Ave. 38°35′46″N 90°18′45″W	
60	Loretto Academy	Loretto Academy	March 5, 1992 (#92000079)	3407 Lafayette Avenue; 38°37′01″N 90°14′07″W	
61	Lutheran Hospital and School of Nursing	Lutheran Hospital and School of Nursing	October 7, 2021 (#100007042)	3535 South Jefferson Ave. (primary); 3519-59 South Jefferson Ave., 2611-19 Miami St. 38°35′27″N 90°13′34″W	
62	Horace Mann School	Horace Mann School	September 2, 1992 (#92001095)	4047 Juniata; 38°36′08″N 90°15′16″W	part of the St. Louis Public Schools of William B. Ittner MPS
63	Marine Villa Neighborhood Historic District	Marine Villa Neighborhood Historic District	December 18, 2009 (#09001099)	Roughly bounded by S. Broadway, Chippewa, Cahokia, Kosciusko, and Winnebago; 38°35′12″N 90°13′24″W	part of the South St. Louis Historic Working and Middle Class Streetcar Suburbs MPS
64	McKinley Fox District	McKinley Fox District	September 7, 1984 (#84002655)	Roughly bounded by 18th St., Interstate 44, and Jefferson and Gravois Aves. 38°36′33″N 90°13′06″W	
65	Eugene and Mary A. Miltenberger House	Eugene and Mary A. Miltenberger House	May 9, 2002 (#02000471)	3218 Osceola St. 38°34′43″N 90°14′28″W	
66	Missouri Botanical Gardens	Missouri Botanical Gardens	November 19, 1971 (#71001065)	2345 Tower Grove Ave. 38°36′45″N 90°15′33″W	
67	Moloney Electric Company Building	Moloney Electric Company Building	March 28, 2002 (#02000270)	1141–1151 S. 7th St. 38°36′57″N 90°11′48″W	
68	Mount Pleasant School	Mount Pleasant School	May 2, 1985 (#85000943)	4528 Nebraska Ave. 38°34′24″N 90°14′12″W	
69	National Candy Company Factory	National Candy Company Factory	November 5, 2009 (#09000889)	4230 Gravois Ave. 38°35′18″N 90°15′30″W	
70	Nooter Corporation Building	Nooter Corporation Building	May 16, 2008 (#08000404)	1400 S. 3rd St. 38°36′48″N 90°11′39″W	
71	Northampton Commercial Historic District		January 29, 2026 (#100012646)	4247, 4251, and 4301 S. Kingshighway; 38°35′25″N 90°16′27″W	
72	Oak Hill Historic District	Oak Hill Historic District	January 10, 2011 (#10001120)	Roughly bounded by Gustine St, Arsenal St, alley west of Portis Ave, Humphrey St; 38°36′06″N 90°15′30″W	
73	Oakview Place Apartments	Oakview Place Apartments	June 13, 2008 (#08000508)	1014–1038 Oakview Pl. 38°37′49″N 90°17′06″W	
74	Oehler Brick Buildings	Oehler Brick Buildings	August 1, 2008 (#08000749)	3542–48 S. Broadway; 38°35′24″N 90°13′05″W	
75	Otzenberger House	Otzenberger House	May 29, 1980 (#80004515)	7827 Reilly St. 38°32′37″N 90°15′27″W	Part of the Carondelet, East of Broadway, St. Louis MRA. Demolished per City of St. Louis Demolition Permit issued in October of 2021 and completed in June of 2022.
76	Pevely Dairy Company Buildings	Pevely Dairy Company Buildings	July 19, 2006 (#06000628)	3301 and 3305 Park Ave. 38°37′19″N 90°13′59″W	
77	Pevely Dairy Company Plant	Pevely Dairy Company Plant	November 18, 2009 (#09000937)	1001 S. Grand, 3626 Chouteau, and 1101 Motard; 38°37′31″N 90°14′15″W	Demolished in February 2012.
78	Pundt Brothers-Garavaglia Grocery Buildings	Pundt Brothers-Garavaglia Grocery Buildings	March 31, 2010 (#10000117)	2857 Lafayette Ave. 38°36′57″N 90°13′39″W	part of the South St. Louis Historic Working and Middle Class Streetcar Suburbs MPS
79	Quinn Chapel AME Church	Quinn Chapel AME Church	October 16, 1974 (#74002277)	227 Bowen St. 38°33′32″N 90°14′51″W	
80	Reber Place Historic District	Reber Place Historic District	March 12, 2012 (#12000100)	Roughly bounded by Arsenal St., Kingshighway Blvd., Southwest Ave. and the alley east of Hereford St. 38°36′32″N 90°16′14″W	
81	Riggio Building	Riggio Building	May 14, 2004 (#04000428)	5145–5149 Shaw Ave. 38°37′12″N 90°16′19″W	
82	Roberts, Johnson and Rand-International Shoe Company Complex	Roberts, Johnson and Rand-International Shoe Company Complex	August 23, 1984 (#84002670)	Mississippi and Hickory Sts. 38°37′10″N 90°12′47″W	
83	Rock Spring School	Rock Spring School	September 2, 1992 (#92001097)	3974 Sarpy Ave. 38°37′50″N 90°14′46″W	part of the St. Louis Public Schools of William B. Ittner MPS
84	St. Boniface Neighborhood Historic District	St. Boniface Neighborhood Historic District	May 9, 2002 (#01000948)	Roughly bounded by Koeln and Tesson Sts., Broadway, and Alabama Ave. 38°32′59″N 90°15′41″W	
85	St. Cecilia Historic District	St. Cecilia Historic District	January 8, 2009 (#08001286)	Bounded by S. Grand Boulevard, Delor St., Virginia Ave., and Bates St. 38°34′09″N 90°14′58″W	part of the South St. Louis Historic Working and Middle Class Streetcar Suburbs MPS
86	St. Francis de Sales' Church	St. Francis de Sales' Church	November 2, 1978 (#78003393)	2653 Ohio St. 38°36′15″N 90°13′33″W	
87	St. Francis de Sales Historic District	St. Francis de Sales Historic District	November 28, 2012 (#12000979)	Bounded by Nebraska, Jefferson, & Victor Aves., Gravois Rd., & Pestalozzi St. 38°36′15″N 90°13′33″W	
88	St. John Nepomuk Parish Historic District	St. John Nepomuk Parish Historic District	June 19, 1972 (#72001558)	11th and 12th Sts. between Carroll St. and Lafayette Ave. 38°36′45″N 90°12′17″W	part of the LaSalle Park MRA
89	St. Louis Air Force Station	St. Louis Air Force Station	January 17, 1975 (#75002139)	2nd and Arsenal Sts. 38°35′38″N 90°12′32″W	
90	Sanford Avenue Historic District	Sanford Avenue Historic District	January 26, 2005 (#04001559)	1000 block of Sanford Ave. 38°37′50″N 90°17′42″W	
91	Schlichtig House	Schlichtig House	May 29, 1980 (#80004516)	8402 Vulcan St. 38°32′25″N 90°15′44″W	part of the Carondelet, East of Broadway, St. Louis MRA
92	Anton Schmitt House	Anton Schmitt House	January 27, 1999 (#98001600)	7727 S. Broadway; 38°32′47″N 90°15′33″W	Originally listed 1992 at 8000 Alaska St., delisted December 19, 1994
93	Schollmeyer Building	Schollmeyer Building	September 28, 1984 (#84002683)	1976–1982 Arsenal St. 38°35′52″N 90°13′13″W	
94	Seventh District Police Station	Seventh District Police Station	March 22, 1984 (#84002685)	2800 S. Grand Ave. 38°36′21″N 90°14′29″W	
95	Shaw Avenue Place	Shaw Avenue Place	April 12, 1982 (#82004741)	Roughly bounded by De Tanty St. and S. Spring, Shaw, and S. Grand Aves. 38°36′57″N 90°14′30″W	
96	Shaw's Garden Historic District	Shaw's Garden Historic District	April 16, 2012 (#12000207)	Roughly bounded by DeTonty, Tower Grove, Shaw, Alfred, Magnolia, Kingshighway, & Vandeventer Aves. 38°36′47″N 90°15′40″W	
97	Soulard Neighborhood Historic District	Soulard Neighborhood Historic District	December 26, 1972 (#72001559)	Roughly bounded by 7th Boulevard and Soulard, Lynch, and 12th Sts. 38°36′20″N 90°12′27″W	
98	Soulard-Page District	Soulard-Page District	August 19, 1983 (#83004515)	Roughly bounded by Soulard, 8th, 12th, and LaSalle Sts. 38°36′49″N 90°12′02″W	part of the LaSalle Park MRA
99	South Side National Bank	South Side National Bank	January 3, 2003 (#00001010)	3606 Gravois Ave. 38°35′31″N 90°14′38″W	
100	Speck District	Speck District	August 15, 1983 (#83004516)	Roughly bounded by S. 11th, Park, Rutger, and S. 12th Sts. 38°36′53″N 90°12′11″W	part of the LaSalle Park MRA
101	Steelcote Manufacturing Company Paint Factory	Steelcote Manufacturing Company Paint Factory	June 27, 2007 (#07000620)	801 Edwin; 38°37′43″N 90°14′02″W	
102	Steins Street District	Steins Street District	May 29, 1980 (#80004514)	Steins St. 38°32′49″N 90°15′26″W	part of the Carondelet, East of Broadway, St. Louis MRA
103	Jacob Steins House	Jacob Steins House	May 29, 1980 (#80004517)	7600 Reilly St. 38°32′43″N 90°15′17″W	part of the Carondelet, East of Broadway, St. Louis MRA
104	Charles Stockstrom House	Charles Stockstrom House	November 9, 2018 (#100003089)	3400 Russell Blvd. 38°36′46″N 90°14′10″W	
105	Stone Houses	Stone Houses	March 27, 1980 (#80004511)	200–204 Stein St. 38°32′53″N 90°15′32″W	
106	Stork Inn	Stork Inn	May 5, 2000 (#00000440)	4527 Virginia Ave, 3301 Taft Ave., and 4526 Idaho Ave. 38°34′29″N 90°14′34″W	
107	Strassberger's Conservatory	Strassberger's Conservatory	March 27, 1980 (#80004512)	2302–2306 S. Grand St. 38°36′35″N 90°14′25″W	
108	Sugar Loaf Mound	Sugar Loaf Mound	February 17, 1984 (#84002689)	4420 Ohio St. 38°34′30″N 90°13′52″W	
109	Thurman Station	Thurman Station	July 23, 2013 (#13000537)	2232 Thurman Ave. 38°36′40″N 90°15′04″W	
110	Tiffany Neighborhood District	Tiffany Neighborhood District	February 10, 1983 (#83001052)	Roughly bounded by 39th St., Lafayette Ave., Vandeventer Ave. and Folsom Ave. 38°37′07″N 90°14′31″W	Boundaries reflect changes made by boundary increases of July 26, 1985 and February 26, 1987 and modified by a boundary decrease of June 18, 2009
111	Tower Grove East Historic District	Tower Grove East Historic District	March 27, 2013 (#13000114)	Roughly bounded by S. Grand, Louisiana, Nebraska, Gravois & Shenandoah Aves. 38°36′11″N 90°14′10″W	
112	Tower Grove Heights Historic District	Tower Grove Heights Historic District	September 6, 2001 (#01000947)	Bounded by Arsenal St., Grand Blvd., McDonald Ave., and Gustine Ave.; also roughly bounded by Magnolia Ave., Louisiana Ave., Cherokee St., Gravois Ave., and Grand Blvd. 38°36′01″N 90°14′46″W	Second set of boundaries represents a boundary increase of April 16, 2004
113	Tower Grove Park	Tower Grove Park	March 17, 1972 (#72001556)	Bounded by Magnolia Ave. on the north, Grand Boulevard on the east, Arsenel St. on the south, and Kings Highway Boulevard on the west 38°36′22″N 90°15′16″W	
114	George F., Jr. and Carrie Tower House	George F., Jr. and Carrie Tower House	September 15, 2005 (#05001034)	1520 S. Grand Ave. 38°37′18″N 90°14′17″W	
115	Union Depot Railroad Co. Building	Union Depot Railroad Co. Building	January 26, 2006 (#05001549)	2727 S. Jefferson Ave. 38°36′19″N 90°13′25″W	part of the South St. Louis Historic Working and Middle Class Streetcar Suburbs MPS
116	Wachter Motor Car Company Building	Wachter Motor Car Company Building	May 24, 2007 (#07000463)	2600–2614 Nebraska Ave. 38°36′30″N 90°13′45″W	part of the Auto-Related Resources of St. Louis, Missouri MPS
117	Wilkinson School	Wilkinson School	November 13, 2018 (#100003086)	7212 Arsenal St. 38°36′35″N 90°18′47″W	
118	Woodward and Tiernan Printing Company Building	Woodward and Tiernan Printing Company Building	April 28, 2015 (#15000174)	1519 Tower Grove Ave. 38°37′22″N 90°15′22″W	
119	Edward Wyman School	Edward Wyman School	September 2, 1992 (#92001096)	1547 S. Teresa; 38°37′08″N 90°14′12″W	part of the St. Louis Public Schools of William B. Ittner MPS
120	Zeiss Houses	Zeiss Houses	May 29, 1980 (#80004518)	7707–7713 Vulcan St. 38°32′43″N 90°15′26″W	part of the Carondelet, East of Broadway, St. Louis MRA

== Former listings ==
	Name on the Register	Image	Date listed	Date removed	Location	Description
1	Lincoln Trust Building	Lincoln Trust Building	March 1, 1982 (#82004736)	December 19, 1994	706 Chestnut St.	Demolished in 1983 for construction of the St. Louis Gateway Mall.
2	The Olympia	The Olympia	August 1, 1986 (#86002088)	December 19, 1994	3863 W. Pine and 200 N. Vandeventer	Demolished in 1993.
3	Unitarian Church of the Messiah	Unitarian Church of the Messiah	September 22, 1980 (#80004513)	December 19, 1994	Locust and Garrison Sts.	Demolished in 1987 following damage from a 1982 fire.
