= Francis Arnold =

Francis Arnold may refer to:

- Frances Arnold (born 1956), American scientist and engineer
- Francis Arnold House
- Francis Arnold, see List of works by William Hogarth

== See also ==
- Frank Arnold (disambiguation)
