= Burn Baby Burn (album) =

Studio album by Norman Howard and Joe Phillips
- Released: 1993, 2007
- Recorded: November 1968
- Studio: Cleveland, Ohio
- Genre: Free jazz
- Length: 51:49
- Label: Homeboy Music; 2 ESP-Disk; 4033

1993 cassette cover

Burn Baby Burn is an album by trumpeter Norman Howard and saxophonist Joe Phillips, who are accompanied by bassist Walter Cliff and drummer Corney Millsap. It was recorded in Cleveland, Ohio, in November 1968 as part of a session that was originally intended for release by ESP-Disk as catalogue number 1073. However, the material was shelved until 1989, when some of the tracks were released by Homeboy Music, a label run by British musicologist Roy Morris, on a limited-edition cassette titled Signals. In 1993, Homeboy reissued the contents of Signals, along with additional tracks from the session, on a second cassette called Burn, Baby, Burn. In 2007, ESP-Disk issued eight of the tracks in remastered form on CD as Burn Baby Burn.

In 2013, the title track was reissued as part of the ESP-Disk sampler Fire Music Vol. 1.

== Reception ==
Professional ratings
Review scores
Source	Rating
AllMusic	4/5 stars
The Penguin Guide to Jazz	3/4 stars
All About Jazz	4.5/5 stars
The Free Jazz Collective	5/5 stars

In a review for AllMusic, Scott Yanow wrote: "Fans of high energy '60s free jazz blowouts will find Burn Baby Burn to be of strong interest. This release should lead to a reappraisal of Norman Howard's skills, and some appreciation for the forgotten altoist Joe Phillips."

The authors of The Penguin Guide to Jazz Recordings described the album as "a period piece, from an incendiary year, but not without interest."

Henry Smith of All About Jazz commented: "These recordings... hold a distinct sound all their own. The closing lines of Burn Baby Burn serve not only as a reminder of the existence of fertile local free jazz communities, but also to that music's vitality. Not only does it serve to provide a deeper and more accurate history of the form, but it also contextualizes and re-informs the work of those, like Ayler, who were able to move outside of their local terrain."

A reviewer for The Free Jazz Collective stated: "it's free jazz at its best, not far removed from its cradle, but the sheer raw power, the emotional expressiveness, the anything-goes-attitude are truly magnificent. But it's not a free-for-all blowing contest, the music is controlled without being too composed, opening up full of possibilities, expressing basic emotions such as anger, sorrow, joy too at moments, with a refreshing directness and musicality."

Writing for the Cleveland Scene, Phil Freeman called the album "a lost treasure of Cleveland avant-garde jazz," and remarked: "Burn Baby Burn is an unsparingly raw document. Its eight compositions fuse raucous blare and innocently joyous melodies... Lucky for us, the music survives and now has a chance to reach the larger audience it has always deserved."

Clifford Allen of Paris Transatlantic wrote: "Norman Howard's music, and that of his mate Joe Phillips, is a superb example of how Albert Ayler's influence inspired musicians back in his hometown as well as throughout the world. More importantly, it shows how vital the free music scene was – and still is – on the local level."

== Track listing ==
All compositions by Norman Howard and Joe Phillips.

1. "The Sound From There" – 6:57
2. "Bug Out" – 7:07
3. "Deep Black Mystery" – 5:59
4. "Time and Units" – 1:50
5. "Sad Miss Holiday" – 10:25
6. "NxJx" – 3:59
7. "Haunted" – 10:08
8. "Burn Baby Burn" – 5:17

== Personnel ==
- Norman Howard – trumpet
- Joe Phillips – saxophone
- Walter Cliff – bass
- Corney Millsap – drums, percussion
