= Alligator Oil Clothing =

Former clothing company with surviving buildings

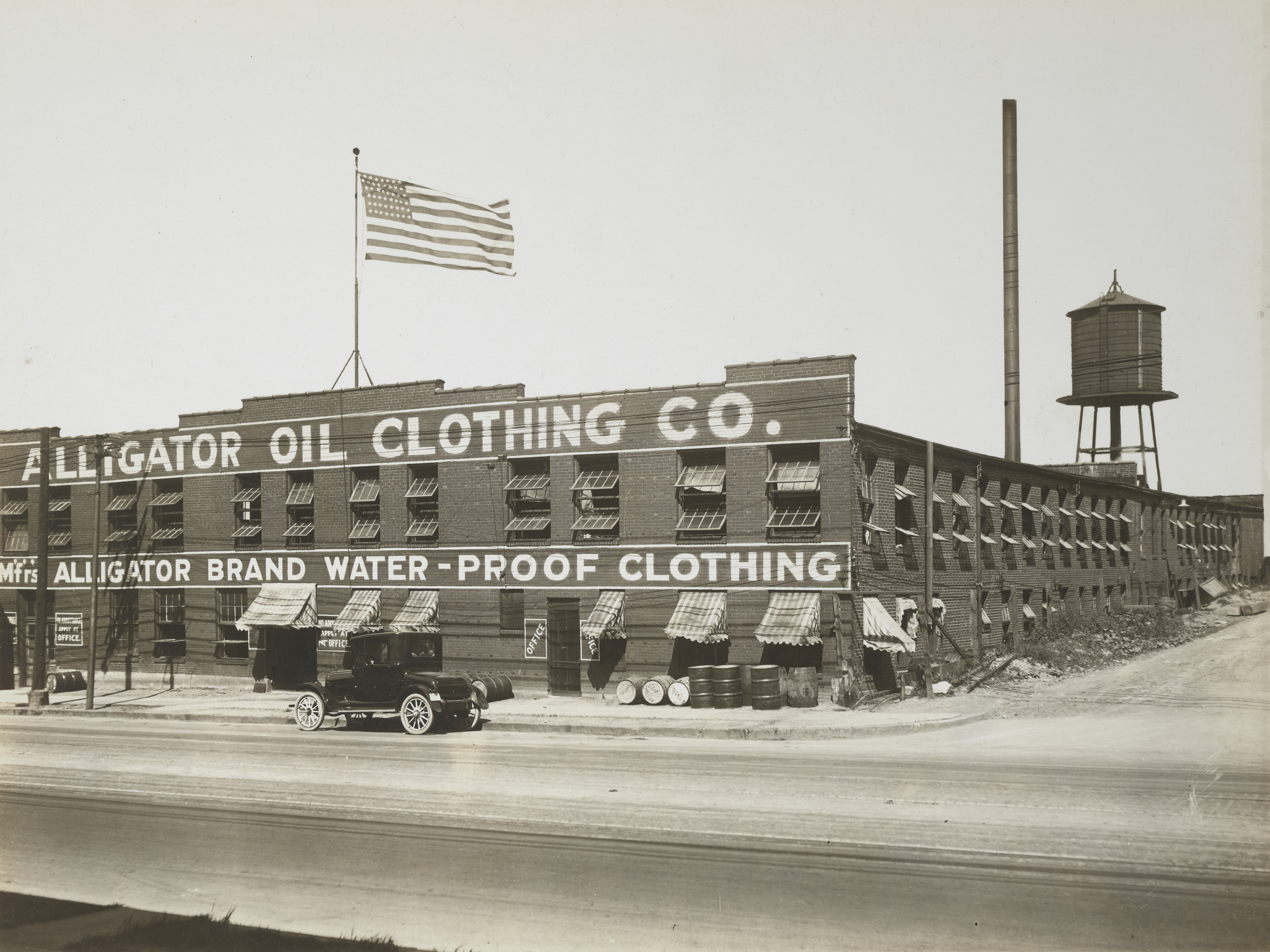

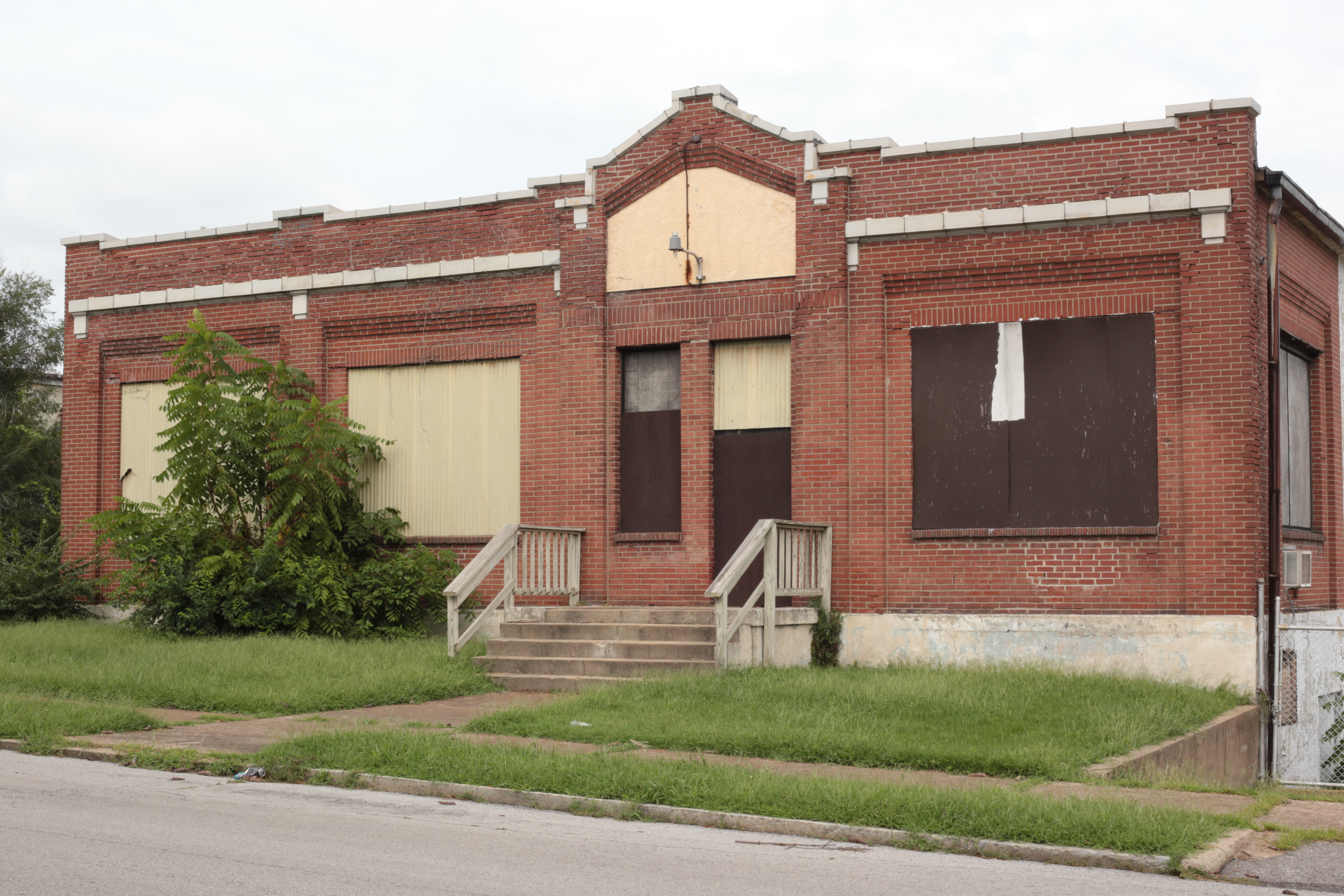
Company building in St. Louis in 2014

Alligator Oil Clothing was a clothing company in the United States. The company made oilcloth. The company's buildings in St. Louis, Missouri are listed on the National Register of Historic Places.

The company's buildings were listed on the National Register in 2013. The Alligator Oil Cloth building at 4153-71 Bingham Avenue in St. Louis is listed on the National Register of Historic Places listings in St. Louis south and west of downtown. They are in the Bevo neighborhood at 4153-7 Bingham Avenue. The two main buildings were designed by architect Leonhard Haege. They are a four-story reinforced concrete factory building built in 1918 and a two-story reinforced concrete office and factory building built in 1919. Haege also designed the Pevely Dairy plant which also remains standing.

Plans are underway for a school to use one of the former company buildings.

== Company history ==
Ferguson Waterproof Company was incorporated before 1911 and eventually reorganized as the Alligator Oil Clothing Company in 1916.

It advertised in Steam Shovel & Dredge. In 1926 the company was involved in a lawsuit.

War-time efforts to remove boundaries and add a new power plant for the factory was reported on, including photos and descriptions of the equipment and processes.

BVD acquired the company in 1966.

== See also ==
- National Register of Historic Places listings in St. Louis south and west of downtown
