= Anheuser-Busch Brewery =

Brewery complex in St. Louis, Missouri

- U.S. National Register of Historic Places
- U.S. National Historic Landmark District
- St. Louis Landmark
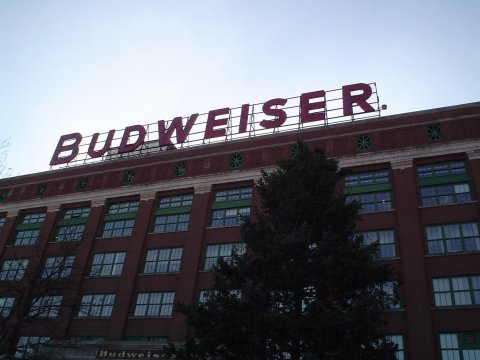
- The packaging plant in St. Louis, Missouri

- Location within St. Louis Location within Missouri Location within the United States
- Location: 721 Pestalozzi; St. Louis, Missouri
- Coordinates: 38°35′51″N 90°12′44″W
- Area: 142 acres (57 ha)
- Built: 1875
- Architectural style: Romanesque
- NRHP reference No.: 66000945

Significant dates
- Added to NRHP: November 13, 1966
- Designated NHLD: November 13, 1966

Anheuser-Busch Brewery is a brewery complex in St. Louis, Missouri. It was opened in 1852 by German immigrant Adolphus Busch. It a National Historic Landmark District. The Lyon Schoolhouse Museum is on the grounds at the Anheuser-Busch Brewery. It is considered to be one of the oldest school buildings in St Louis. It served as the head offices of the brewery after 1907. The museum contains rare mementos gathered from the founding of the company to current day, including pictures of the brewery and its expansion over the years. The 142 acres (57 ha) property includes 189 buildings. Some of the most striking are red brick Romanesque architecture with crenelated towers and elaborate ornamentation.

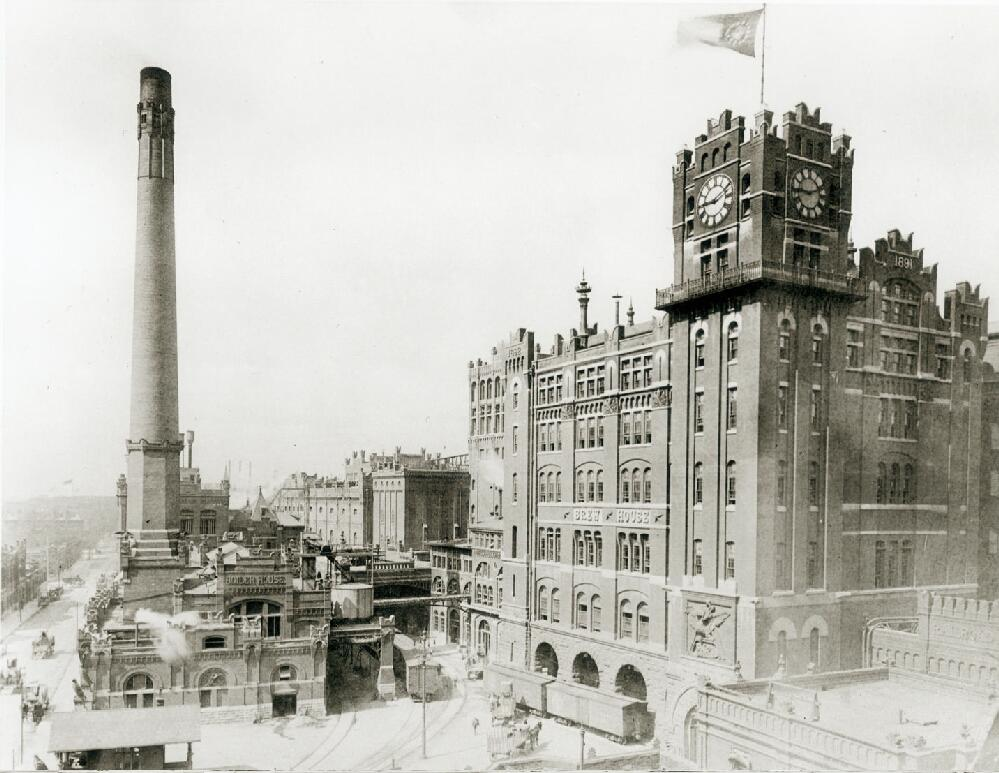
Anheuser-Busch Brewery c. 1880

The company keeps a rotation of its Budweiser Clydesdales at its headquarters; the historic draft horses were originally used to pull wagons carrying beer in the 19th-century days of the company and are now one of the recognizable symbols of the brand. Visitors to the brewery can observe the Clydesdales in their exercise field and see their places in the carriage house.

Some of the herd is kept at the company farm in St. Louis County. Known as Grant's Farm (having been owned by former President Ulysses S. Grant at one time), this complex is also home to other animals such as elephants, tortoises, and a variety of mammals. Since 2008, approximately half of the Budweiser Clydesdales have been kept at the Warm Springs Ranch near Boonville, Missouri.

The brewery was designated a U.S. National Historic Landmark in 1966, recognizing the company's place in the history of beer brewing and distribution in the United States. The landmarked area includes 189 structures spread over 142 acres (57 ha), including many red brick Romanesque ones "with square crenelated towers and elaborate details." The Brew House, built in 1891–1892, is particularly notable for its "multi-storied hop chandeliers, intricate iron-work, and utilization of natural light".

== See also ==
- List of National Historic Landmarks in Missouri
- National Register of Historic Places listings in St. Louis south and west of downtown
