= Frank Arnold (footballer) =

Australian rules footballer

Personal information
- Full name: William Francis Arnold
- Born: 13 August 1877; South Melbourne, Victoria
- Died: 25 December 1943 (aged 66); Ivanhoe, Victoria
- Original team: Albert Park

Playing career^{1}
Years	Club	Games (Goals)
1899	South Melbourne	9 (0)
- ^{1} Playing statistics correct to the end of 1899.

William Francis Arnold (13 August 1877 – 25 December 1943) was an Australian rules footballer who played with South Melbourne in the Victorian Football League (VFL).

After his football career Arnold served in France during World War I, being wounded in the arm, neck and right lung during three years of active service.
