= Norman Howard =

- Born: August 25, 1944 (age 81); Cleveland, Ohio, U.S.
- Genres: Free jazz
- Occupation: Musician
- Instrument: Trumpet

Norman Howard (born August 25, 1944) is a free jazz trumpeter best known for his association with saxophonist Albert Ayler.

== Career ==
Howard was born and raised in Cleveland, Ohio, in the same neighborhood as Ayler, and played with the saxophonist before he went into the army. In 1962, Ayler moved to Europe, where he made his first recordings, and when he returned, he reunited with Howard. In 1963, Ayler moved to New York City, and Howard followed in early 1964. In February of that year, with Howard, bassists Henry Grimes and Earle Henderson (also from Cleveland), and drummer Sunny Murray, Ayler recorded the album Spirits. Howard's dirge-like composition "Witches and Devils" appeared on the recording, although he was not given credit.

=== Quartet ===
Shortly after the recording session, Howard returned to Cleveland, where he formed a quartet with saxophonist Joe Phillips (also known as Yusef Mumin), bassist Walter Cliff, and drummer Corney Millsap. In November 1968, the group recorded material that was originally intended for release by ESP-Disk as catalogue number 1073. However, the material was shelved until 1989, when some of the tracks were released by Homeboy Music, a label run by British musicologist Roy Morris, on a limited-edition cassette titled Signals. In 1993, Homeboy reissued the contents of Signals, along with additional tracks from the session, on a second cassette called Burn, Baby, Burn. In 2007, ESP-Disk issued eight of the tracks in remastered form on CD as Burn Baby Burn.

Following the 1968 recording session, Howard converted to Islam and disappeared from the music scene.

== Tribute ==
In 2001, saxophonist Mats Gustafsson, along with members of The Thing and School Days, recorded a tribute to the trumpeter in the form of an album titled The Music of Norman Howard, released the following year on Anagram Records.

== Discography ==
=== As leader ===
- Signals (Homeboy Music, 1989) (cassette)
- Burn, Baby, Burn (Homeboy Music, 1993) (cassette) reissued as Burn Baby Burn (ESP-Disk, 2007)

=== With Albert Ayler ===
- Spirits (Debut, 1966) reissued as Witches & Devils
- Spirits to Ghosts Revisited (ezz-thetics, 2022) (reissue / compilation)
- Fire Music Vol. 1 (ESP-Disk, 2012) (sampler)
