= Lafayette Historic District (Lafayette, Virginia) =

Historic district in Virginia, United States

- U.S. National Register of Historic Places
- U.S. Historic district
- Virginia Landmarks Register
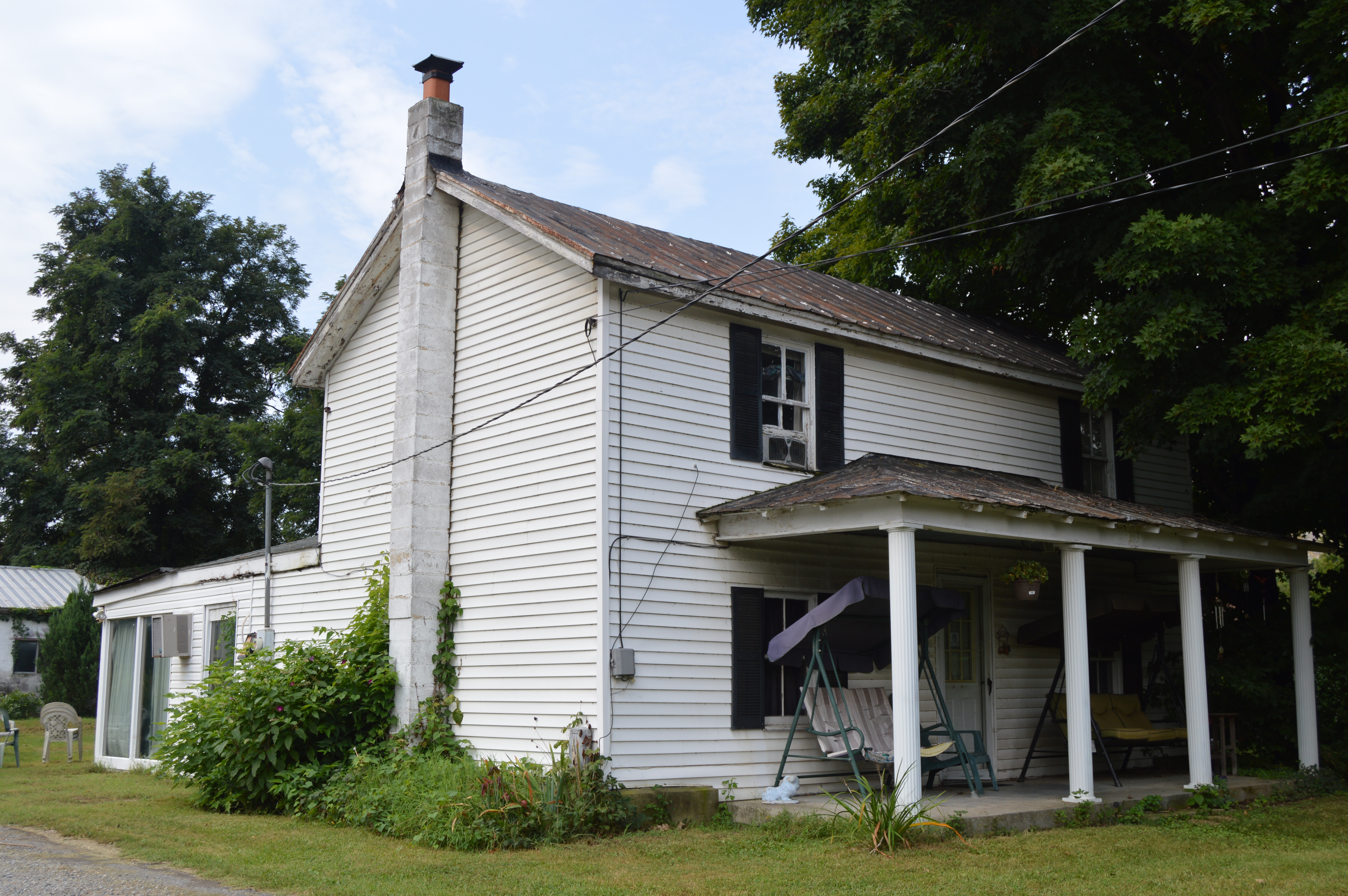
- House at Loving and Walthall Streets

- Location within Virginia Location within the United States
- Location: Roughly, High St. from Main to Washington Sts., Main from High to Water Sts. and Church St. from Main to Washington, Lafayette, Virginia
- Coordinates: 37°14′7″N 80°12′39″W
- Area: 12 acres (4.9 ha)
- Architectural style: Center-passage plan
- MPS: Montgomery County MPS
- NRHP reference No.: 90002005
- VLR No.: 060-0418

Significant dates
- Added to NRHP: January 10, 1991
- Designated VLR: June 20, 1989

Lafayette Historic District is a national historic district located at Lafayette, Montgomery County, Virginia. The district encompasses 19 contributing buildings in the village of Lafayette. It includes principally single family dwellings of frame construction dating from about 1830 to 1940. Notable buildings include the Pepper House (c. 1829), Lafayette Methodist Church (c. 1847), Sid Butt Barbershop and House (1940), Gardner Store, and Butt Store.

It was listed on the National Register of Historic Places in 1991.
