= Forest Park Southeast Historic District =

Historic district in Missouri, United States

- U.S. National Register of Historic Places
- U.S. Historic district
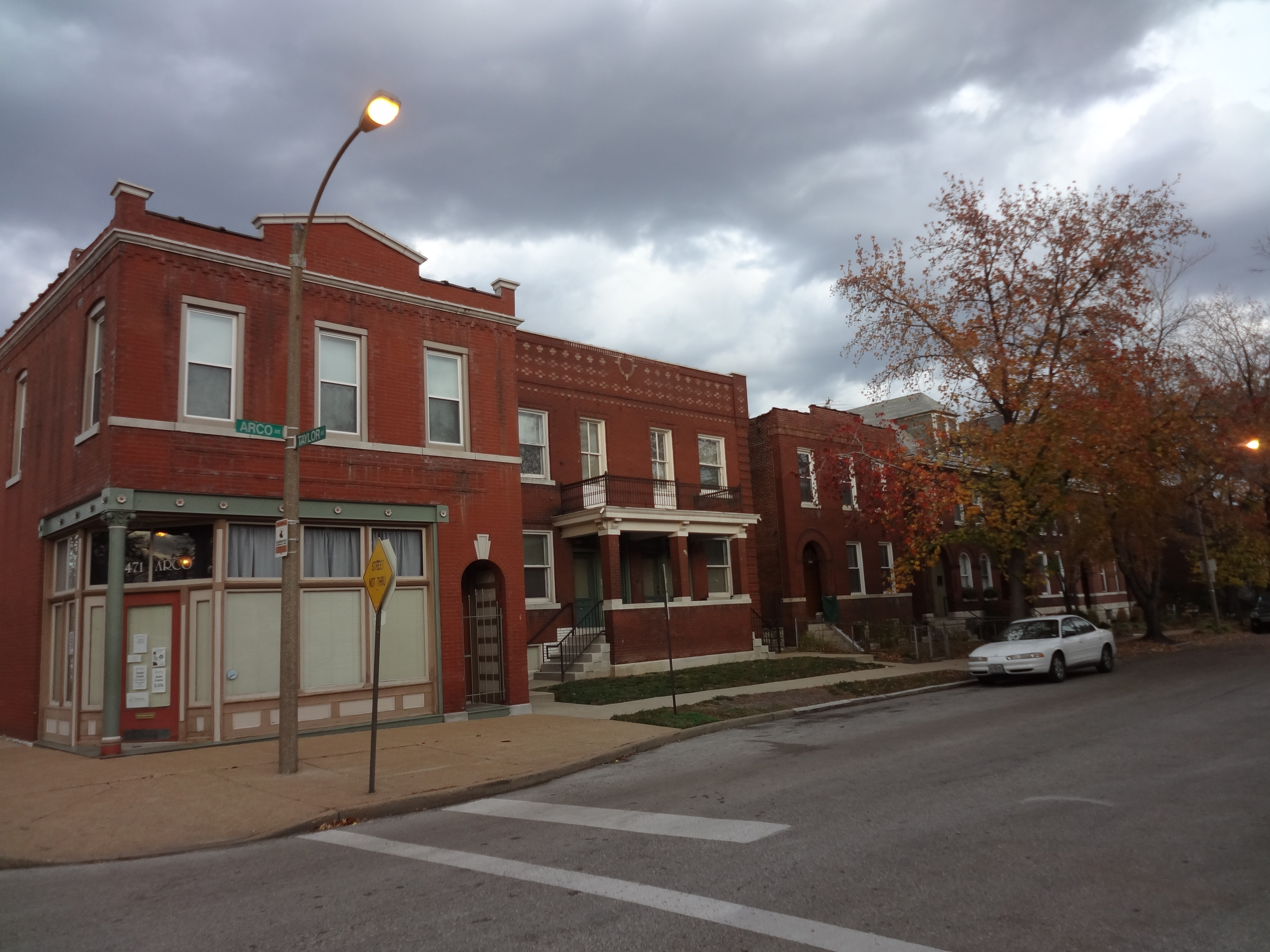
- An intersection in the Forest Park Southeast Historic District

- Location within St. Louis Location within Missouri Location within the United States
- Location: Roughly bounded by Chouteau Ave., Manchester and Cadet Aves., Kingshighway Blvd., and S. Sarah St., St. Louis, Missouri (original); 4170-4370 (even) and 4229-4341 (odd) Manchester Ave. (boundary increase 2005); 4121-25, 4127-29, 4131, 4133, 4137, 4139-41, 4143, 4145, 4501-07, 4509-11, 4510, and 4512-14 Manchester Ave. (boundary increase 2007)
- Coordinates: 38°37′43″N 90°15′33″W
- Area: 1,544 acres (2.413 sq mi) (original); 11.5 acres (4.7 ha) (increase 1); 3 acres (1.2 ha) (increase 2); 5 acres (2.0 ha) (increase 3); 35.8 acres (14.5 ha) (increase 4)
- Built by: C.J. Christophel and others
- Architects: Frank Arnold (architect) and others
- Architectural style: Colonial Revival, Romanesque, and others
- NRHP reference No.: 01001360 (original), 05000612 (boundary increase 2005), 07000015 (boundary increase 2007), 09000596 (boundary increase 2009), 12001072 (boundary increase 2012)
- Added to NRHP: December 20, 2001; June 16, 2005 (increase 1); February 7, 2007; August 5, 2009; December 19, 2012

Forest Park Southeast Historic District is a historic district roughly bounded by Chouteau Ave., Manchester and Cadet Aves., Kingshighway Blvd., and S. Sarah St. in St. Louis, Missouri. It was mainly developed as a working class residential district. It was added to the National Register of Historic Places in 2001, deemed significant in both community planning and development and in architecture.

The district provides 20 percent tax credits for eligible renovations.

"Amazing tool for redevelopment" (approximately).

The original district identified in 2001 included 612 buildings and structures deemed contributing, with 92 of those being outbuildings such as garages.

Architecture in the district includes numerous high architectural styles as well as St. Louis-area local styles. Numerous buildings are historical eclectic in styles, and some are vernacular and lacking in discernible style.

Buildings in the district include single and multiple dwellings, a specialty store, a religious structure and a meeting hall. A boundary increase in 2005 added 51 buildings on 4170-4370 (even) and 4229-4341 (odd) Manchester Ave. to the district in 2005. A second boundary increase in 2007 added 4121–25, 4127–29, 4131, 4133, 4137, 4139–41, 4143, 4145, 4501–07, 4509–11, 4510, and 4512-14 Manchester Ave. in 2007. Third and fourth boundary increases added more.

NRHP doc original

Boundary increase 1 in 2005 added 51 contributing buildings.

Boundary increase 2 in 2007 added 12 contributing buildings.

Boundary increase 3 in 2009 added 12 more contributing buildings.

Boundary increase 4 in 2012 added 189 more contributing buildings.

"Architectural styles found in the District range from high style buildings to building types with stylistic references. Most of the high style buildings are restrained versions applied to a working, middle-class neighborhood and include variations of popular styles from the era in which they were constructed. The District's Late Victorian styles include nine Italianate (Photograph #21, 4200 through 4208 Chouteau Ave. and Photograph 36, 4400 Chouteau Ave.); four Second Empire (Photograph # 26, 4306 and 4308 and 4310-12 Chouteau Ave., and Photograph # 17,4300 Chouteau Ave.); 10 Queen Anne (Photograph # 113,4547 Arco Ave. and Photograph # 46, 4476 Chouteau Ave.); nine Italian Renaissance Revival] (Photograph # 115, 4445-47 Gibson) and 37 Romanesque Revival (Photograph # 12, 4459-61 Oakland Ave., Photograph # 66, 4340 Arco Ave., and Photograph # 79 second from left, 4346 Gibson Ave.)."

"Late Nineteenth and Early Twentieth Century Revival styles include 40 Colonial Revival (Photograph #121, 4538 Arco Ave., Photograph # 100,4435-37 Gibson; three Tudor Revival (Photograph # 53,4531-39 Chouteau Ave.); three Late Gothic Revival churches ( Photograph # 61, 1124 Kingshighway Blvd.); and one Mission Revival (Photograph # 71,4301-03 Arco Ave.). Modem Movement buildings found in the District include the Art Deco Masonic Building (Photograph # 64 and # 102, 1052-56 Kingshighway Blvd.) and nine Craftsman style residences (Photograph # 89, 4519 Oakland Ave. and Photograph # 107,4559 Wichita)."

"Local Stylistic Adaptations In addition to buildings with high style architectural treatments, the majority of the residential buildings in the District reflect the restrained stylistic treatments applied to housing for the working classes during this period. The District contains 356 buildings classified as Historical Eclecticism sub-types due to the presence of a number of stylistic references popular when the building was erected (Photograph # 101, 4445 Arco Avenue, Photograph #106,4564 Gibson Avenue., Photograph # 120, 1083 S. Taylor) or by the presence of very simple treatments that reference a particular style. These stylistic references are not strong or pronounced enough to qualify as pure styles, but characteristics of the style can be identified as such. Examples include: Romanesque Revival references (Photograph # 90 far right, 4527 Oakland Avenue and Photograph # 68 far left, 4331 Arco Avenue); Colonial Revival references (Photograph # 105,4563 Chouteau Avenue., and Photograph # 32, 4378 Chouteau Avenue); Mission Revival references (Photograph # 57 second from the left, 4554 Chouteau Avenue); and Prairie Style/Arts and Crafts references (Photograph # 117,4527 Wichita Avenue, Photograph # 114,4552 Chouteau Avenue)."

"In addition, there are a number of buildings that have no stylistic references. They include National Folk House forms such as the example at 4420 Chouteau Avenue (Photograph # 124). Others have a classifiable form with restrained ornamentation such as tapestry brick building at 1120-22 S. Taylor Avenue (Photograph #119).

The St. Louis Preservation Plan identifies a classification of single family houses called "Shaped Parapet Single Family Houses" which it defines as "a brick one-story house type with a front shaped parapet" with one or two bays. The plein notes that they enjoyed popularity between 1900 and 1920, and that "the earliest have recessed entries and Romanesque Revival detail; later houses had a small one-story porch. A distinctive feature of these houses is the use of decorative or glazed bricks to enliven the front façade."'"' Examples of residences incorporating these identifying characteristics, in particular the use of a shaped parapet in front of a flat roof and decorative glazed bricks in the façade, are common among buildings with Late Victorian and Revival style references. The use of decorative parapets is almost universal in the District, reinforcing the cohesiveness of the District. With the exception of the handful of buildings featuring the Second Empire mansard roof, the Mission Revival tiled roof or the vermicular gable-front house; the remainder of the residences in the District, including multi-family buildings, has shaped parapets. As such, it is difficult to classify these features as a sub-style. As they appear in the District, they merely reference roof form and ornamentation patterns found in a large number of the residential and commercial buildings in the District."

"20th Century Modernization During the District's initial period of development, indoor plumbing, central heating, electric wiring and gas stoves changed the lives of not only the wealthy but also of the middle-class wage earner. Room arrangements put the kitchen of the servantless working class household in communication with other private spaces and opened house interiors to space, light and garden views. And, as the privy and the barn for horse and dairy cow disappeared, the back yard featured some amenities such as gardens and seating areas along with the coal shed and clothesline. By the twentieth century, the automobile garage replaced the dairy barn. The remaining garages and storage sheds in the District provide clues to the evolution of the outbuildings from fuel storage sheds and shelters for animals and carriages to meeting the needs of the automotive age. By the end of the first decade of the twentieth century, building permits for the demolition of wooden sheds and the construction of brick garages begin to appear. At the same time, building permits for new residential units include detached garages. The size of these ancillary buildings reflects the units for which they were built. Detached single-family houses have small, one-bay garages. Duplexes have two bay garage buildings, Four Family Flats have parking structures to accommodate four cars. Like their predecessors, the carriage house and bam, they are oriented to the brick alleys that bisect each block.

Although a wide variety of new building materials emerged in the first decades of the twentieth century, middle and working class residential architecture did not use the hand-crafted ceramic tile, leaded and stained glass, wrought iron and hand-finished wood ornament that were popular Arts and Crafts building materials. And, even though industrial technology made poured concrete, concrete cinder blocks, stucco on metal lath, steel framing, glass blocks and other mass-produced materials affordable, most dwellings continued to be built of traditional materials in traditional ways."

"ARCHITECTS AND BUILDERS Research identified approximately 140 architects and/or builders as designers who contributed to the design of the buildings in the District. Most were active in development of residential neighborhoods in the surrounding area."

"Frank Arnold (architect), also listed on building permits as Arnold & Sons, Arnold Construction Company and Arnold Contracting Company. Based on a review of existing building permits, Arnold appears to have associations with over 39 buildings in the District. The buildings are scattered throughout the District and date to a period between 1900 and 1923. He appears to have erected buildings on speculation as well as under contract with a developer or individual owner."

• Residences designed and built by Alfred How, who is listed on the building permits as an architect-builder, appear in concencrated patterns within the district. Perhaps the most notable are the series of shotgun houses in the 4400 block of Arco Avenue. How's buildings include 4418, 4422, 4426-30,4456 Chouteau Avenue; 4400,4406,4409-11,4430,4450-52 Gibson Avenue; 4425-41, 4448-52 and 4522 Arco Avenue; 1079 and 1073 Taylor Avenue; and 4414-18 Oakland — all built between 1894 and 1911."

- "E. Spencer erected 18 buildings in the District between 1904 and 1912. Spencer worked for individual clients and with the Brennan Brothers Realty Company as well as purchasing lots and building on them. His buildings include the dwellings at 4424-46, 4544-46, 4545-47, 4547-51, and 4562 Oakland Avenue; 4342, 4514 and 4467-71 Arco Avenue; 4477 and 4566 Gibson Avenue; and 4530, 4540, and 4547 Wichita Avenue."
- "Builders Frank J. and Fred Darr erected 20 buildings for individual clients. Some appear to be speculative. All date to the period 1895-1927 and include buildings at 4420, 4439, 4449, 4557, and 4458 Oakland Avenue; 4112 Chouteau Avenue; 4415,4421-23,4425-27, 4435-37,4424 and 4444 Gibson Avenue; 4538 and 4540 Arco Avenue; and 1117-23 Taylor Avenue. The Christophal family lived in the District and erected five buildings at 4513-21 Gibson Avenue between 1891 and 1899."
- "Edward F. Nolte, designer of the Lambskin Masonic building at 1025 Kingshighway Boulevard, was connected with the architectural firm of L. Cass Miller for five years before going into his own practice in 1894. Nolte collaborated with Preston Bradshaw and later with Fred Nauman. Of German descent, Nolte incorporated stylistic features that were characteristic of the Art Nouveau Movement in Germany. The Art Deco Lambskin Masonic Temple at 1025 Kingshighway is listed on the National Register for its significance in architecture."

Architects and builders include: Frank Arnold (architect) and others H. Christophel builder C.J. Christophel builder H.H. Christophel Frank J. Darr builder Fred Darr builder

Architect/Builder (continued) Alfred How (architect) E.A. Darr (builder) Laherty, Michael (builder) Spencer, A.E. (builder) Houser T. L. (builder) Oliver J. Popp (architect) Henty Shamburg (architect) Aiple, Albert (builder) Beck, August (architect) Tabor, O.R.S. (builder) Beckemeier, E. H. (builder) Becker, Gerhard (builder) Berger, R.A. (builder) Buckley, Thomas J. (builder) Herman Burgdorf (architect) Christophel, H. (builder) Comwell, B. (builder) Comwell (F. J.) & Co. (builder) Darr, Frank (builder) Egan, John (builder) Guth, H.W. (builder) W.P. Hacker (architect) Horman, Louis (builder) Groves, A.B. (builder) Leahman, George E. (builder) Naherly, M. (builder) Nothstien Nolte, (architect). Poertner, C.H. (builder) Schumacher. S. O. (builder) Boehmer, Otto J. (builder) Boyer, John D. (builder) Bums, W. C. (builder) Dougherty, C. (builder) Hella, G. J. (builder) Bull & Smith Co. (builder) Cann, W. A. (builder) Cavanaugh, M.H. (builder) F.C. Bonsac (architect) Norman Howard (architect) William McMahon (architect) Otto J. Wilhelma (architect)"

"Architect/Builder The list below includes individuals or companies that were associated with the construction of the buildings within the Boundary Increase, whether or not they were previously identified with the original Forest Park Southeast Historic District. Those with an asterisk (*) served both as architects and builders. Architects Ernest Hess Costello, J.

- H. Mayer Company

Gloss, S. Nauman, Fred McKelvey, J, N, Muehliesen and Milz Wedemeyer and Nelson Arnold, F, Holtman, M. E. Howe, Fred Popp, O.J, Falkenheimer, E, Herman, L,

- Amold, Frank
- Erecker, H, B,
- Fred E. A. Darr and Son

Christopher, E. E. Meyer, A. Louis Harman Guth, H. W. Hermann, Louis Lawler, E. J.

- Higley, J. C.

Gerhard Becker

Builders/Contractors Smith and Company Gacich, R. S. Kinney, E. H. Hines, J. F. Darr, Fred E. A. Damon, William How, Alfred Eswin, Hugo Wassmann, W. H. Craig, A. Davis, Rose R, A. & G. B. Bullock McKelvey Construction Co. Zeller, George P. Johnson, E. B. Vocker, George Ferguson, Jason Hahn, Charles Zeller and Walker Segel, I. Smith and Company Loyd, R. J. Cunningham, H. H. W. Nelson, Herman E. Simon E. A. W. C. Hartig Construction Co. Arnold Contracting Co.
