= Lafayette Square Historic District (St. Louis) =

Historic district in Missouri, United States

- U.S. National Register of Historic Places
- U.S. Historic district
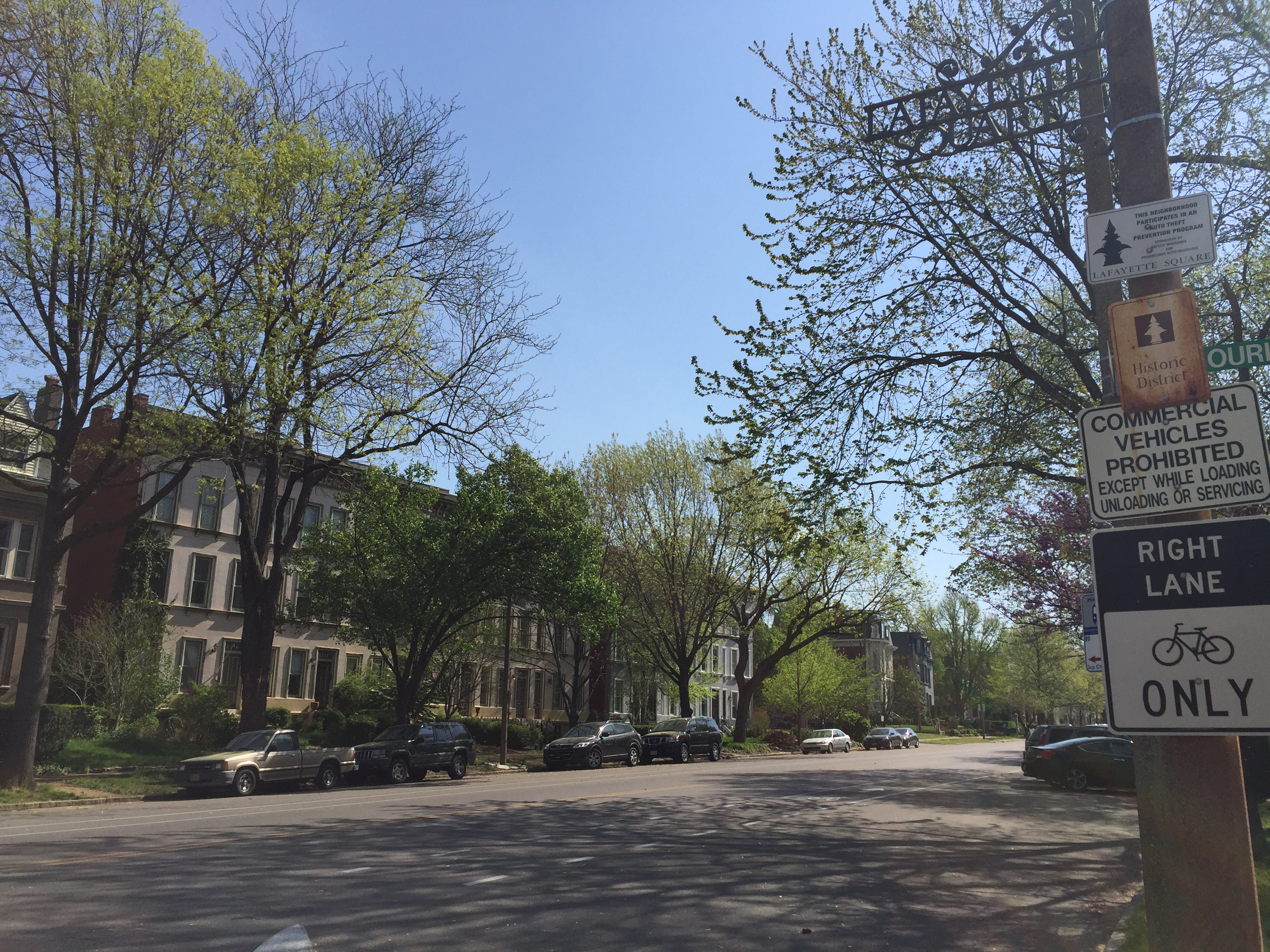
- Lafayette Square Historic District

- Location within St. Louis Location within Missouri Location within the United States
- Location: Roughly bounded by Hickory and 18th Sts., Jefferson and Lafayette Aves. in St. Louis, Missouri (original); roughly bounded by Chouteau Ave., Dolman, Lafayette Ave., and S. Eighteenth St. and Vail Pl. and MacKay Pl., St. Louis (boundary increase)
- Coordinates: 38°37′3″N 90°12′45″W
- Architect: Raedner, Frederick W. Et al.
- Architectural style: Late 19th and 20th Century Revivals, Second Empire, Italianate, Romanesque
- NRHP reference No.: 72001557 (original), 86002127 (boundary increase)
- Added to NRHP: June 28, 1972 (original), July 24, 1986 (boundary increase)

Lafayette Square Historic District is a historic district roughly bounded by Hickory and 18th Sts., Jefferson and Lafayette Aves. in St. Louis, Missouri. Buildings in the district include a department store, a single dwelling, a public park, and a specialty store. The district was added to the National Register of Historic Places in 1972. A boundary increase in 1986 added an area roughly bounded by Chouteau Ave., Dolman, Lafayette Ave., and S. Eighteenth St. and Vail Pl. and MacKay Pl. Buildings in the boundary increase include single and multiple dwellings, a manufacturing facility and a specialty store.

Original NRHP document.

Boundary increase NRHP document

== See also ==
- Lafayette Square, St. Louis
- National Register of Historic Places listings in St. Louis south and west of downtown
