= Pevely Dairy Company Plant =

- U.S. National Register of Historic Places
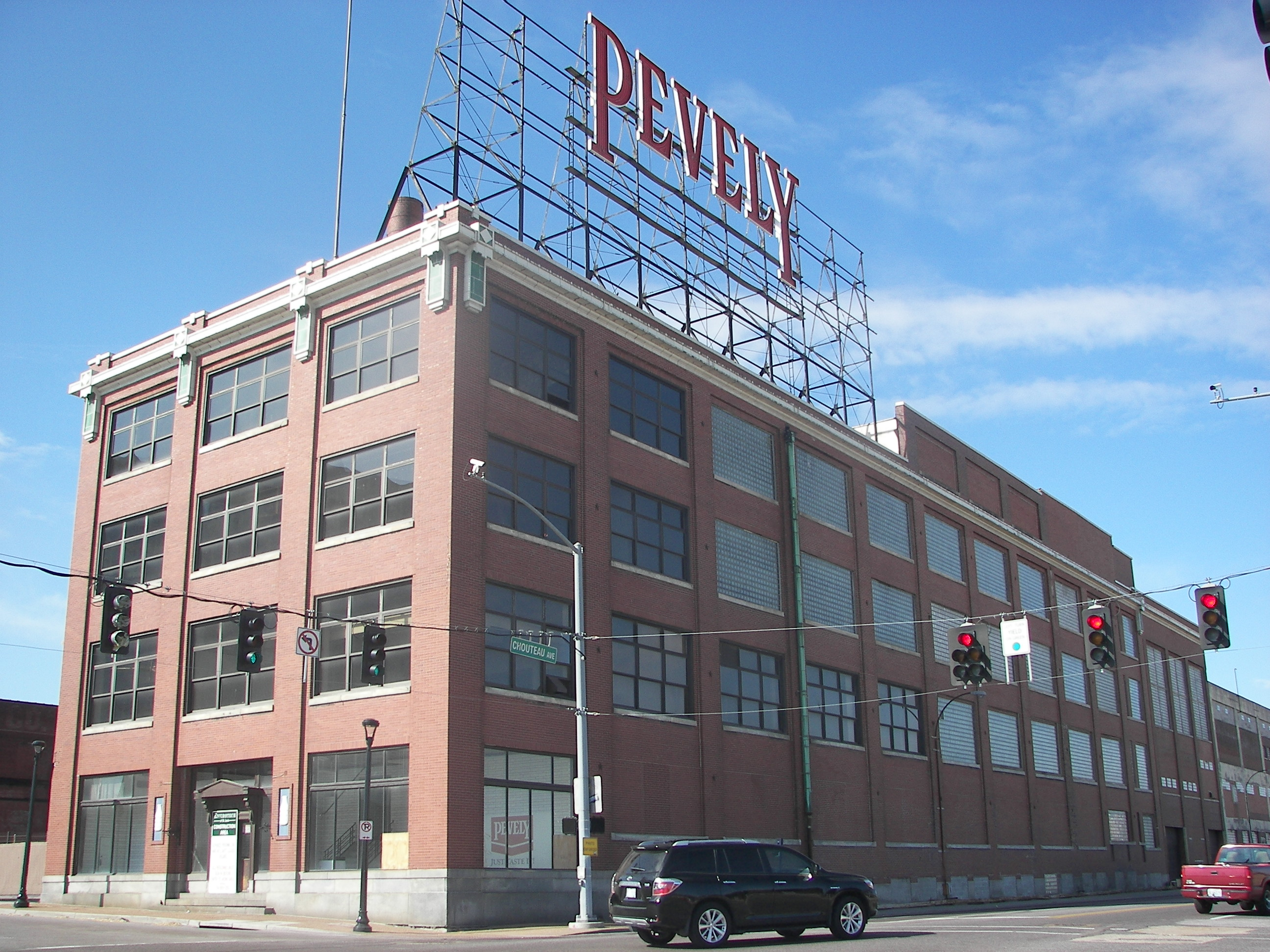
- Pevely Dairy Company Plant, March 2012. The building has since been demolished.

- Location within St. Louis Location within the United States
- Location: St. Louis, Missouri
- Coordinates: 38.6258°N 90.23784°W
- Area: 8 acres (3.2 ha)
- Built: 1915
- Architect: Leonard Haeger
- Architectural style: Industrial Classical Revival
- NRHP reference No.: 09000937
- Added to NRHP: November 18, 2009

The Pevely Dairy Company Plant was a former factory complex of the Pevely Dairy Company in St. Louis, Missouri, located at 1001 South Grand Boulevard and 3626 Chouteau Avenue. The eight-acre property included three contributing buildings and one contributing object. While in operation, the plant operated as a dairy production facility, a stable for horses for wagon delivery of milk, the company's headquarters, and a soda fountain. The company itself was owned and operated by the Kerckhoff family from its founding in the 1880s through 1989, when it was bought by Prairie Farms Dairy. The building was one of the oldest independent dairies remaining in St. Louis.

The oldest building on the site dates to 1915 and was located at the southwest corner of Grand Blvd. and Chouteau. Located at 1001 South Grand Blvd., it housed the offices for the company on four stories. The red brick office building has a three-bay facade on the first story, and inside it retained its white glazed brick walls and flooring. The upper floor roof line included a decorated cornice. In 1916, Pevely added a brick and concrete factory building on the site, located at 3626 Chouteau Avenue. The factory underwent expansions in 1943, 1945, 1975, 1985, and 1997; in addition, a garage was built south of the factory at 1101 Motard Avenue in 1928, and a smokestack on the site that dates to 1943 included glazed brick lettering that spells out Pevely.

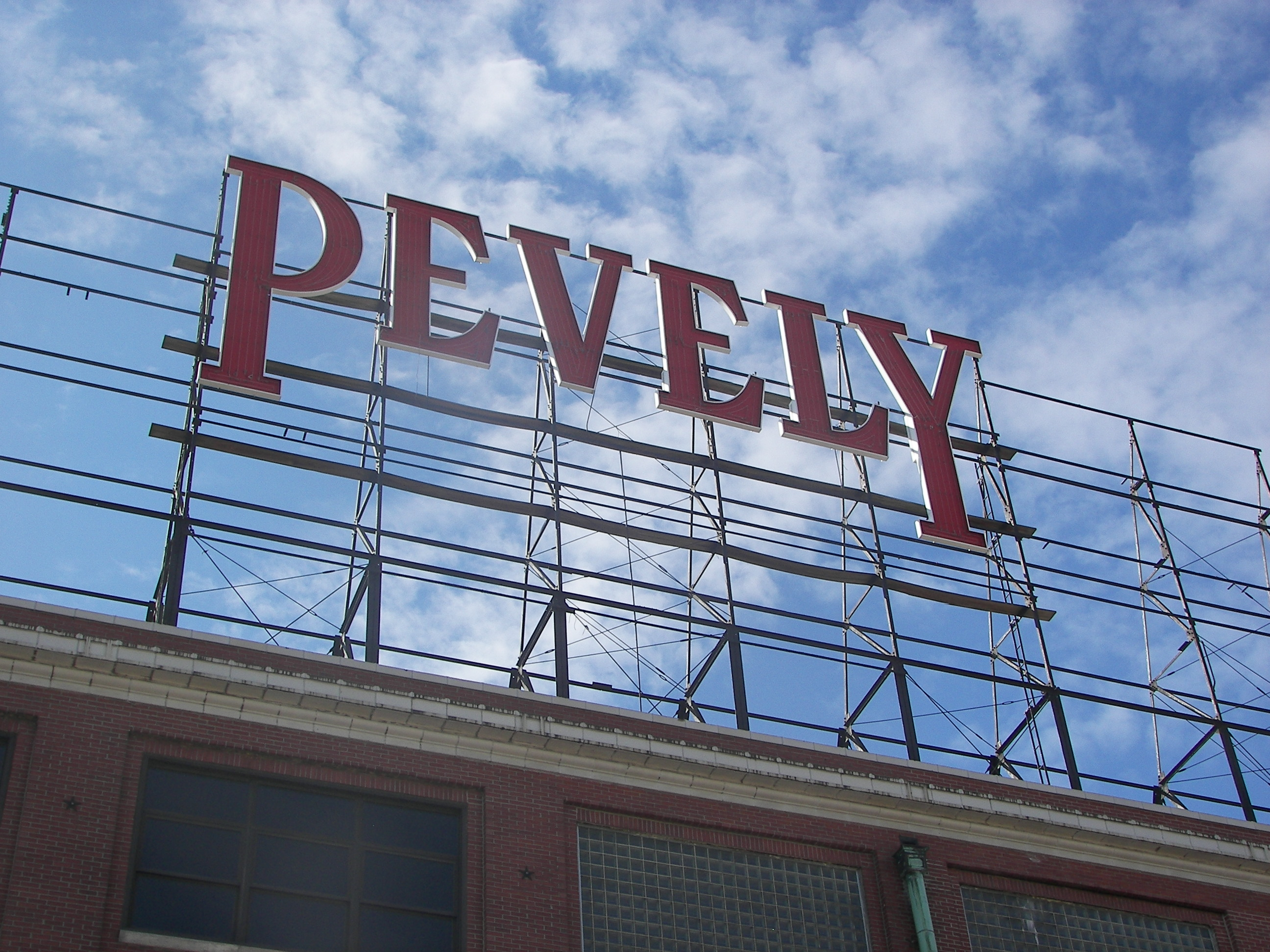
The marquee sign for the Pevely Dairy Company Plant was located on top of the office building.

In October 2008, Prairie Farms closed the factory, which was the last Pevely facility still in use. The property is currently vacant. In March 2009, a fire destroyed the ice cream factory building on the site. That same year, the complex was nominated and accepted to the National Register of Historic Places.

In August 2011, Saint Louis University purchased the site from Prairie Farms. Despite its listing on the National Register of Historic Places, Saint Louis University requested permission to demolish the entire complex in December 2011. The St. Louis Preservation Board initially denied the university permission to demolish all buildings on the site, but in February 2012, the city Planning Commission overturned the denial. Immediately prior to the vote, university President Lawrence Biondi threatened to close the Saint Louis University School of Medicine in the city and move its operations to St. Louis County if the denial were not overturned. In place of the complex, the university intends to construct a $75 million outpatient care center.

Demolition of the plant began early April 2012. In September 2020, the newly constructed SSM St Louis University Hospital opened for patient care on the site of the former plant.
