= Military Road (Arlington, Virginia) =

Highway in Virginia, United States

- Length: 2.2 mi (3.5 km)
- South end: US 29 at North Quincy Street in Arlington
- Major junctions: SR 120 in Arlington
- North end: North Old Glebe Road in Arlington

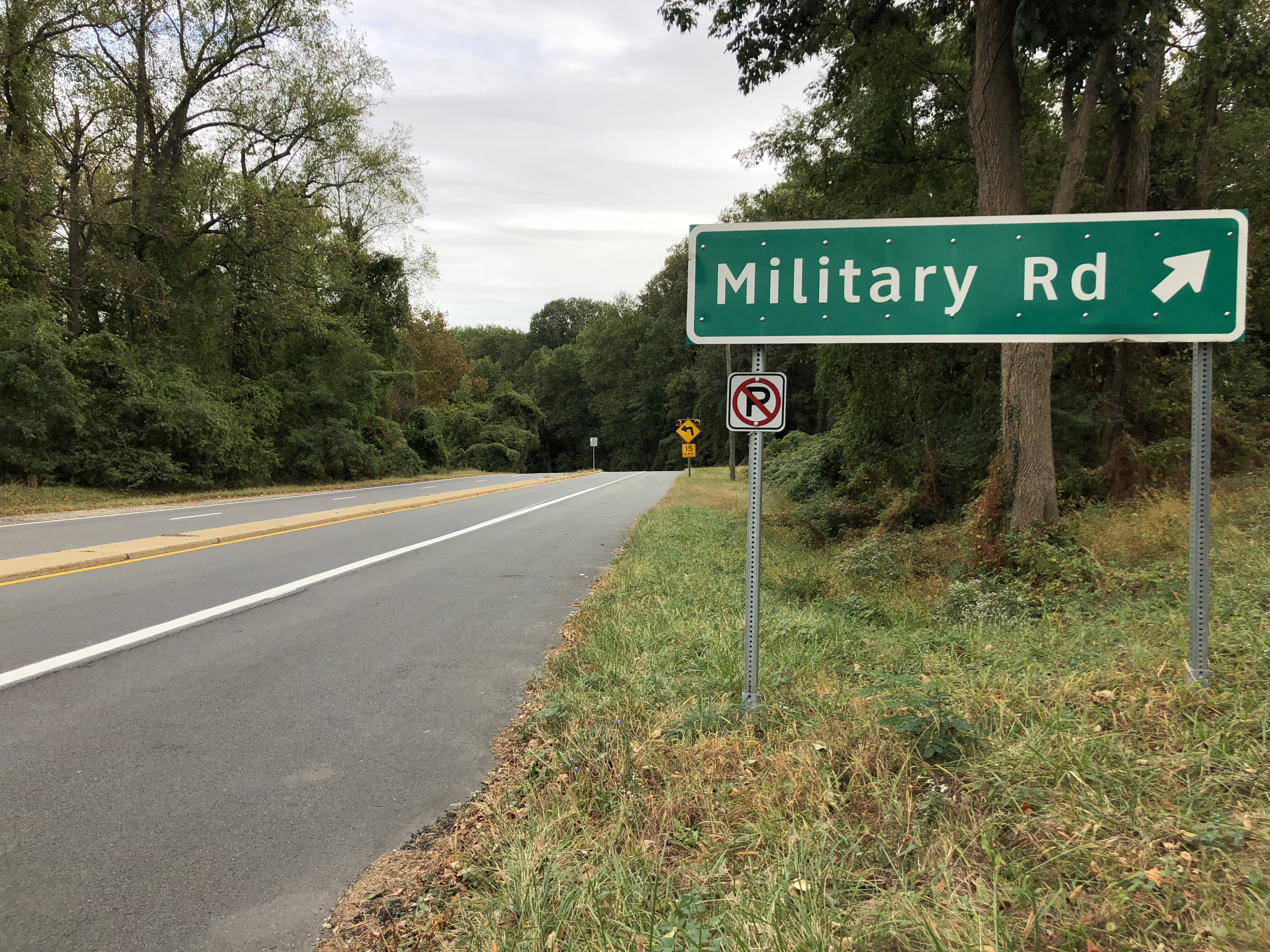
An exit from Glebe Road for Military Road in Arlington County, Virginia

Military Road is a two-lane arterial road with bike lanes along the majority of the road that is approximately 2.2 miles (4 km) in length in Arlington County, Virginia. It travels in a southeast-to-northeast direction, with its southern terminus at U.S. Route 29 (US 29), where the roadway continues as North Quincy Street, and its northern terminus at North Old Glebe Road near Virginia State Route 120 (SR 120).

== History ==
Military Road was built in September 1861 to link several new forts built as part of the defenses of the city of Washington, DC, during the American Civil War. It was constructed through dense forest in just three days by United States Army troops. It was the first of several "Military Roads" which were built near and through the city of Washington, and which eventually formed a network of such transportation thoroughfares essential to the city's defense. It was extended five miles (8.0 km) south (following what is now U.S. Route 29 east to the Potomac River, and then roughly following Virginia State Route 110) in the fall of 1862 and again later in the war until it ended near present-day Ronald Reagan Washington National Airport.

Military Road remained under the federal government's control for many years. In 1890, the United States Congress passed legislation improving Military Road and turning it into a wide boulevard for traffic. The road was the subject of a major lawsuit around 1900. Part of Military Road passed through the "Murray Estate", a land grant stemming from the early days of European settlement in North America, and the owners of the estate proposed closing the section of the road which passed through their property. Arlington County officials refused to challenge the proposal, claiming this was a fight only for the federal government (owners of the road). The State of Virginia sued the owners, and in Commonwealth v. Howard P. Marshall a state court upheld the state's right to ensure an unimpeded roadway. After the introduction of the automobile, Military Road became a favorite of motorists cutting across Arlington County. In 1909, the federal government began posting military guards along the road to ensure that speed limits were obeyed. Later that year, the federal government won an eminent domain case against landowners who owned property to the east of Military Road, allowing the street to be expanded by 20 feet (6 m).

The northern end of Military Road assumed its current terminus and shape in 1925. With the construction of Wilson Boulevard and Chain Bridge, major impediments to traffic occurred on the Virginia side of the Potomac River as older streets curved around natural landscape features. Arlington County straightened many of the roads on the eastern approaches to Chain Bridge and truncated others to provide a smoother flow of traffic to and over the bridge. Additionally, the county improved the intersection of several streets with Wilson Boulevard to the south to improve safety and traffic flow. Military Road was one of the streets truncated in the north so that traffic now used North Glebe Road to access the bridge. In the south, Military Road was shortened as Wilson Boulevard was straightened. In 1925, much of Military Road from the foot of the 14th Street Bridge to the junction with Arlington Boulevard was improved. The road was straightened, widened from 30 feet (9 m) to 60 feet (18 m), and marshland along the side of the road drained.

In 1926, the area's first airport, Hoover Field, was built on both sides of Military Road. Hoover Field's single runway was crossed by Military Road, and an airport employee had to stop traffic with a rope when planes landed. When the airport installed a traffic light to prevent vehicles from crossing the runway when a plane landed, Arlington County officials fined the airport manager for obstructing traffic, and the light was removed. Congress passed legislation in 1938 closing Military Road where it bisected the airport.

Military Road assumed a growing importance in the regional transportation system in the 1930s and 1940s. In August 1931, Arlington County and the U.S. Army agreed to end a dispute over who should continue to maintain the road, with the county taking responsibility for the road itself and the military assuming authority over connections and on/off ramps to nearby military facilities like Fort Myer and Arlington National Cemetery. One of the first traffic lights on Military Road was installed at the street's intersection with Wilson Boulevard in August 1934. In 1937, the federal government offered to sell Military Road to Arlington County for $1, but the county turned down the offer. The usefulness of the southern leg of Military Road from the 14th Street Bridge to Arlington Boulevard declined in the late 1930s. Although it once served as a major feeder street to traffic crossing the 14th Street Bridge, Military Road was severed from this road network in 1939. In 1941, much of Military Road in the vicinity of the 14th Street Bridge was obliterated by construction of The Pentagon.

The area on either side of Military Road became a fashionable suburb around 1900 and into the early part of the 20th century. In 1967, large homes owned by many wealthy individuals lined what remained of Military Road.

== Major intersections ==
The entire route is in Arlington, Arlington County.

mi	km	Destinations	Notes
0.0	0.0	US 29 (Lee Highway / Old Dominion Drive)	Five Points Intersection; roadway continues as North Quincy Street
2.2	3.5	SR 120 north – Chain Bridge	Interchange
2.2	3.5	North Old Glebe Road to SR 120 south	Northern terminus
1.000 mi = 1.609 km; 1.000 km = 0.621 mi

== In popular culture ==
Military Road appears in several novels which take place in and around Arlington County and Washington, DC, including Walter J. Stuart's Charlie, Systems and God, Jane Barcroft's Murder Out of the Ballpark, and Colin MacKinnon's Morning Spy, Evening Spy.
