= Virginia State Route 120 =

State highway in Arlington County, Virginia, United States

State Route 120
- Glebe Road

Route information
- Maintained by VDOT
- Length: 9.10 mi (14.65 km)
- Existed: 1940–present

Major junctions
- South end: US 1 in Crystal City
- I-395 in Arna Valley; US 50 in Arlington Heights; I-66 in Ballston; US 29 in Glebewood
- North end: SR 123 in Arlingwood

Location
- Country: United States
- State: Virginia
- Counties: Arlington

Highway system
- Virginia Routes; Interstate; US; Primary; Secondary; Byways; History; HOT lanes
← SR 119	→ US 121

State Route 120 (SR 120) is a primary state highway in the U.S. state of Virginia. Known as Glebe Road, the state highway runs 9.10 miles (14.65 km) from U.S. Route 1 (US 1) in Crystal City north to SR 123 at the Chain Bridge. SR 120 is a partial circumferential highway in Arlington County that connects the southeastern and northwestern corners of the county with several urban villages along its crescent-shaped path, including Ballston. The state highway also connects all of the major highways in Virginia that radiate from Washington, including Interstate 395, I-66, US 50, and US 29. SR 120 is a part of the National Highway System for its entire length.

== Route description ==
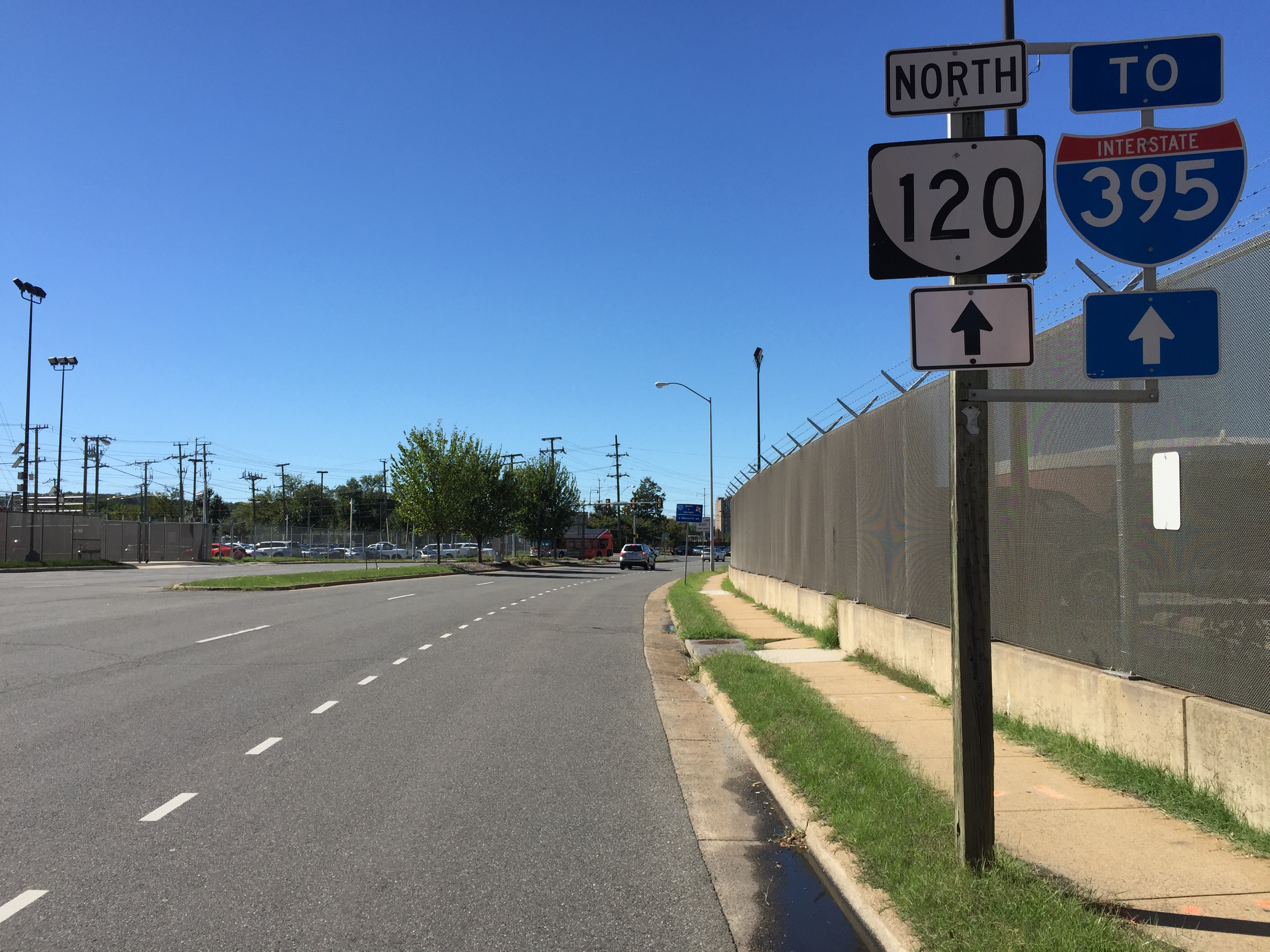
View north at the south end of SR 120 at US 1 in Crystal City

SR 120 begins at an intersection with US 1 (Richmond Highway) at the south end of Crystal City, just north of the city of Alexandria––though Glebe Road actually continues three blocks east of US 1 where it ends at Potomac Avenue. The state highway heads west as a four-lane divided highway through the Arlington County sewage treatment facility. West of the facility, SR 120 parallels the Four Mile Run Trail and Four Mile Run, both to the south, and passes to the south of the Arlington Ridge community. At the point the old alignment of SR 120, also named Glebe Road, crosses Four Mile Run into Alexandria, the state highway veers northwest away from the stream and meets I-395 (Henry G. Shirley Memorial Highway) at a partial cloverleaf interchange north of Shirlington. North of the freeway, SR 120 passes between the historic Lomax African Methodist Episcopal Zion Church and Army Navy Country Club. North of its oblique intersection with Walter Reed Drive, the state highway passes through the commercial center of Westmont, where the highway intersects SR 244 (Columbia Pike). North of Westmont, SR 120 has a partial cloverleaf interchange with US 50 (Arlington Boulevard) adjacent to the Cathedral of Saint Thomas More.

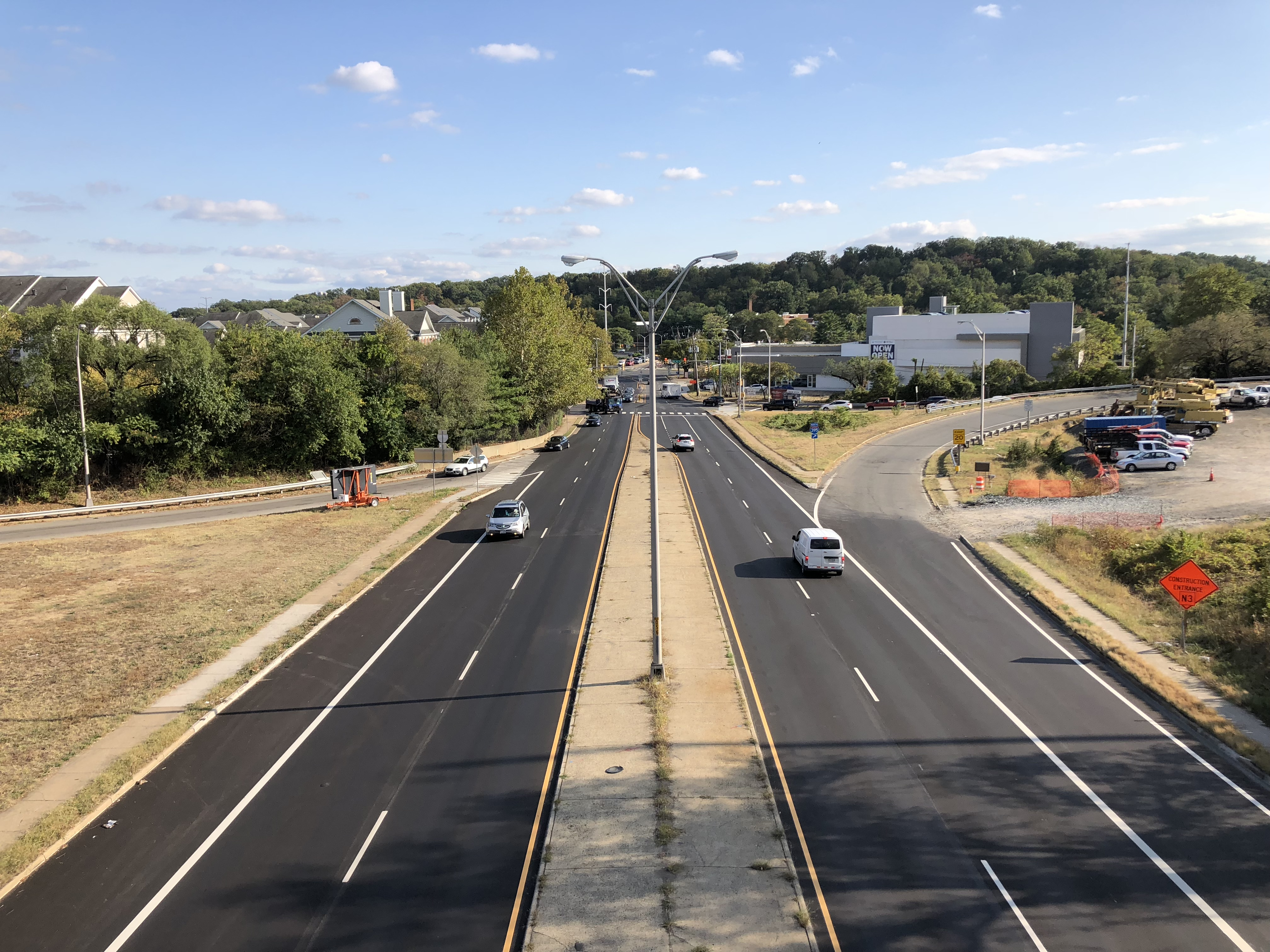
SR 120 southbound past I-395

SR 120 continues north onto Ballston, where the highway expands to six lanes at Quincy Street. The state highway passes by Ballston Quarter and the adjacent MedStar Capitals Iceplex, practice rink of the Washington Capitals. SR 120 veers north at Wilson Boulevard and passes by the Arlington Center of Northern Virginia Community College at Fairfax Drive, which heads east as SR 237 toward Clarendon and west as ramps to and from I-66 toward Falls Church. The state highway runs concurrently with SR 237 for two blocks north to Washington Boulevard, onto which SR 237 heads west toward Falls Church. Just north of Washington Boulevard, SR 120 has a partial interchange with I-66 that allows access to and from the direction of Washington and where the highway crosses the Custis Trail.

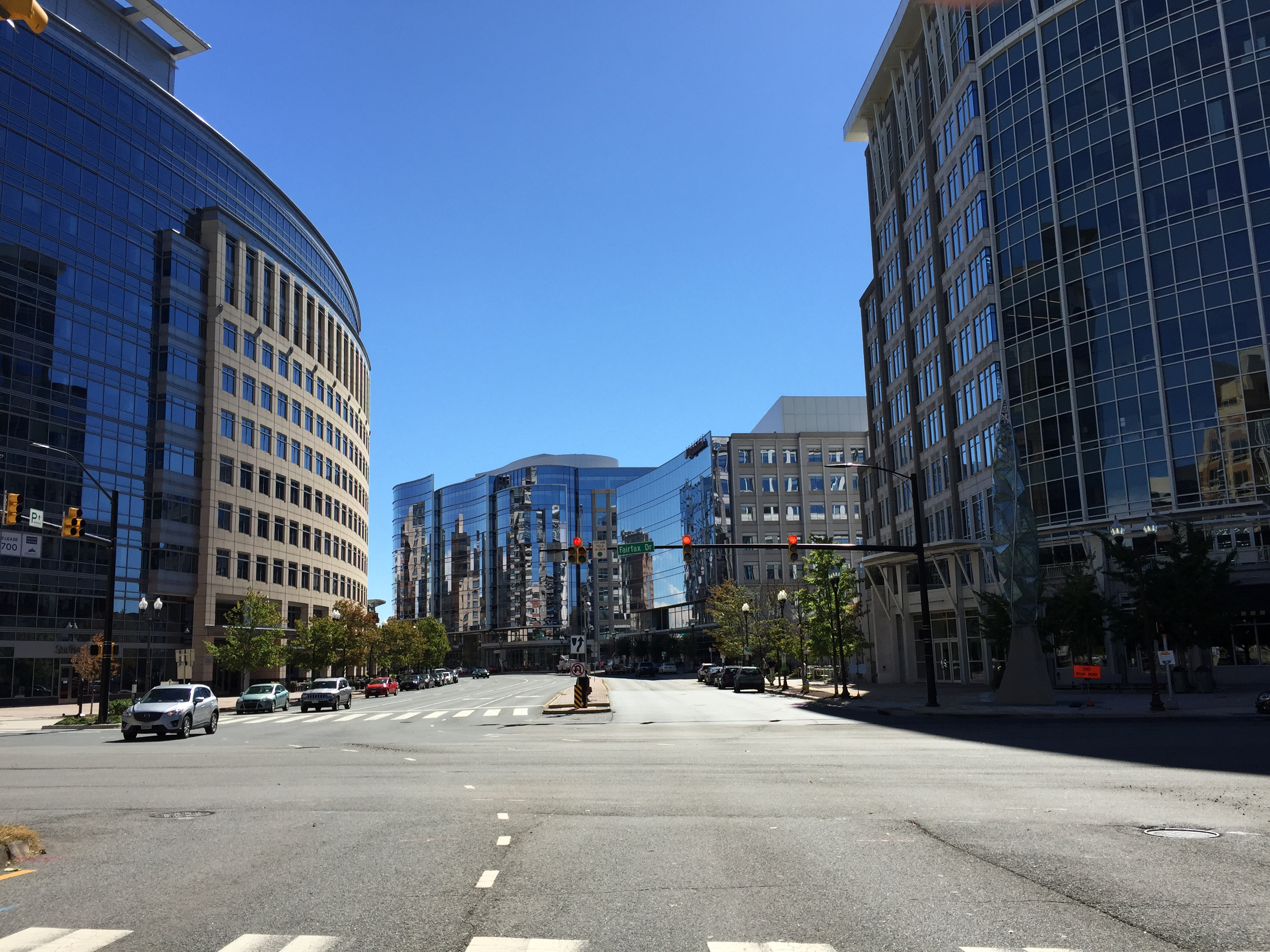
SR 120 at SR 237 in Ballston

SR 120 leaves Ballston as a four-lane divided highway that passes by The Glebe House and intersects US 29 (Lee Highway). The state highway has an oblique intersection with SR 309 (Old Dominion Drive) on an overpass of Yorktown Boulevard adjacent to Marymount University. At Williamsburg Boulevard, SR 120 veers northeast to parallel the Arlington–Fairfax county line. At the top of its descent to the Potomac River, the state highway has a partial cloverleaf interchange with Military Road, a residential street, and reduces to a two-lane undivided road. The highway has a sweeping curve to the north and passes below the George Washington Memorial Parkway immediately before its northern terminus at SR 123 (Chain Bridge Road), which connects SR 120 with the Parkway. The road continues straight as SR 123 to the Chain Bridge, which crosses the Potomac River just below Little Falls to an intersection with Canal Road and the Clara Barton Parkway in Washington a short distance east of the District of Columbia–Maryland boundary.

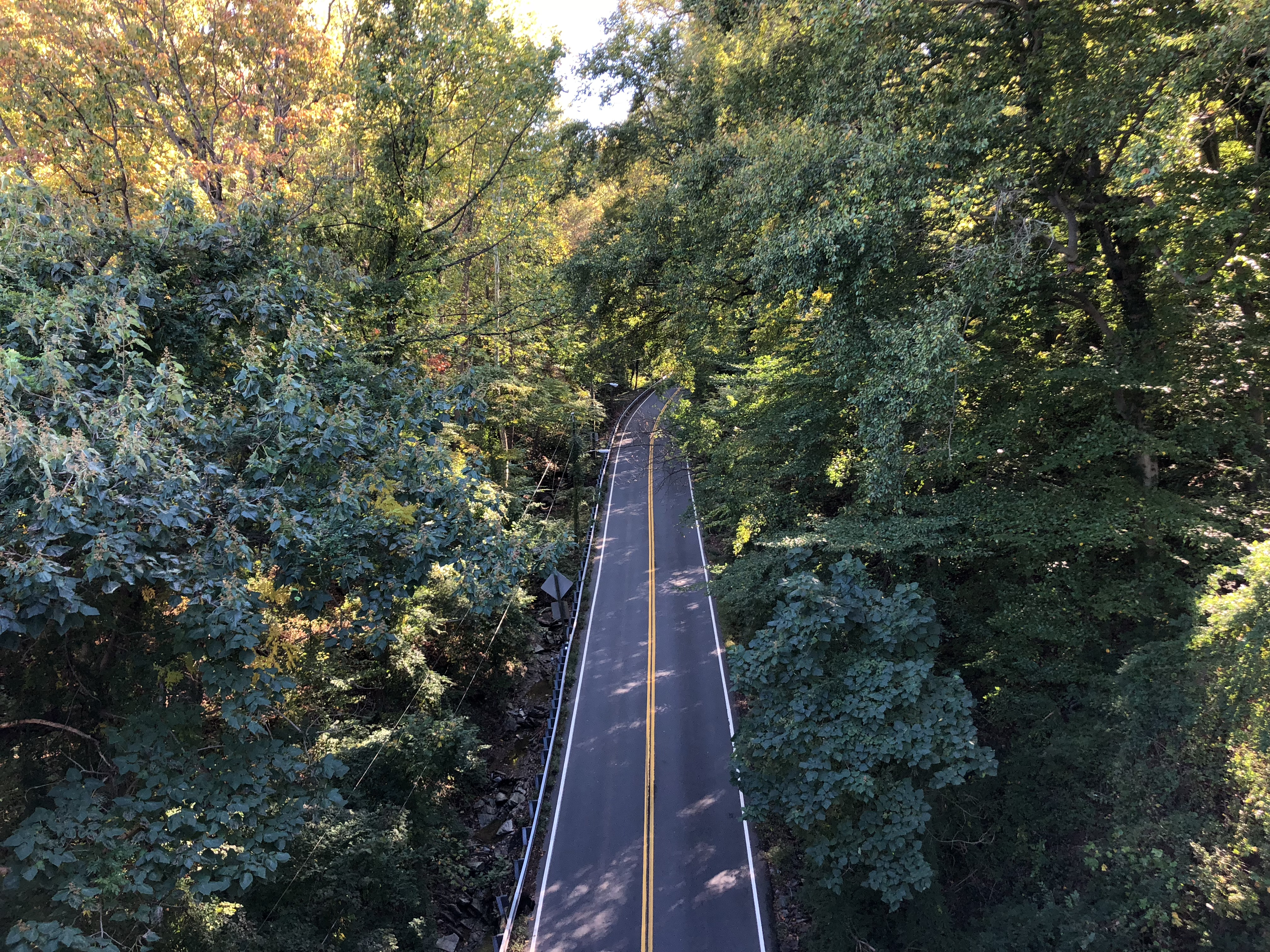
SR 120 southbound past George Washington Memorial Parkway

== History ==
A road along the present path of SR 120 has existed at least since the 1750s. This road, linking Alexandria to Great Falls, was first known as the "Road to the Falls." It took its present name from the nearby glebe lands that were used to support the clergy of the colonial Fairfax Parish of the Church of England; those lands also gave their name to the historic Glebe House, which was built in the 19th century on the former glebe property and sits near what is now SR 120.

SR 120 appeared in its current form in the 1940 renumbering, replacing a small part of SR 9, which itself had replaced the original designation of SR 25 in the 1933 renumbering. The majority of SR 25 became SR 123 in 1940.

Another SR 120 was designated in Franklin County in the 1933 renumbering, which consisted of two sections. One was the present-day SR 739 from its intersection with the present-day US 220 at Boones Mill westward for 5 miles (8.0 km). The other was the present-day SR 602 from its intersection with SR 40 near Ferrum northward for 5 miles (8.0 km).

Glebe Road intersects through several areas that have seen an increase in pedestrian traffic since the 1970s. Arlington County and local citizens started discussions on improving pedestrian safety in 2003; the implementation of these started in 2013 and is scheduled to complete in 2014.

== Major intersections ==
The entire route is in Arlington County.

Location	mi	km	Destinations	Notes
Crystal City	0.00	0.00	US 1 (Richmond Highway) – Crystal City, Reagan National Airport, Alexandria	Southern terminus; Glebe Road continues east for three blocks without designation
Arna Valley	1.65	2.66	I-395 – Richmond, Washington	Exits 7A-B on I-395 (Shirley Highway)
Westmont	2.89	4.65	SR 244 (Columbia Pike)	
Arlington Heights	3.75	6.04	US 50	Parclo interchange with Arlington Boulevard
Ballston	4.88	7.85	SR 237 east (Fairfax Drive) to I-66 west	Southern terminus of SR 237 concurrency
Ballston	5.13	8.26	SR 237 west (Washington Boulevard)	Northern terminus of SR 237 concurrency
Ballston	5.20	8.37	I-66 east – Washington	Exit 71 on I-66; tolled AM rush hours except HOV-2+ vehicles
Glebewood	6.06	9.75	US 29 (Lee Highway) – Falls Church, Washington	
Donaldson Run	6.61	10.64	SR 309 (Old Dominion Drive) to US 29 north – McLean, Washington	No right turns
Rivercrest	8.60	13.84	Military Road	Interchange
Arlingwood	9.10	14.65	SR 123 south (Chain Bridge Road) / Chain Bridge – Washington	Northern terminus; northern terminus of SR 123
1.000 mi = 1.609 km; 1.000 km = 0.621 mi: Concurrency terminus; Electronic toll collection; Incomplete access
