= Virginia State Route 123 =

State highway in northern Virginia, US

State Route 123

Route information
- Maintained by VDOT
- Length: 29.27 mi (47.11 km)
- Existed: 1940–present

Major junctions
- South end: US 1 in Woodbridge
- I-95 in Woodbridge; SR 286 in Burke Centre; US 29 / US 50 in Fairfax; I-66 in Oakton; SR 243 in Vienna; SR 7 in Tysons; I-495 in Tysons; SR 267 near McLean; George Washington Parkway in Langley; SR 120 in Arlington
- North end: Chain Bridge in Arlington

Location
- Country: United States
- State: Virginia
- Counties: Prince William, Fairfax, City of Fairfax, Arlington

Highway system
- Virginia Routes; Interstate; US; Primary; Secondary; Byways; History; HOT lanes
← SR 122	→ SR 124

State Route 123 (SR 123) or Virginia State Route 123 (VA 123) is a primary state highway in the U.S. state of Virginia. The state highway runs 29.27 miles (47.11 km) from U.S. Route 1 (US 1) in Woodbridge north to the Chain Bridge across the Potomac River into Washington from Arlington. It goes by five local names. From its southern terminus to the Occoquan River Bridge, it is known as Gordon Boulevard. From the Occoquan River Bridge to the city of Fairfax it is known as Ox Road. From Fairfax until it enters the Town of Vienna, it is known as Chain Bridge Road. Then, as it passes through the Town of Vienna, it is known as Maple Avenue. After leaving Vienna, the name reverts to Chain Bridge Road, and continues this way until intersecting with the Capital Beltway in Tysons. Between Tysons and the George Washington Memorial Parkway, it is known as Dolley Madison Boulevard. After crossing over the George Washington Memorial Parkway, the name once again reverts to Chain Bridge Road and continues under this name until the end of the road, at Chain Bridge.

SR 123 is a partial circumferential highway in Northern Virginia that connects Woodbridge in eastern Prince William County with the independent city of Fairfax and the Fairfax County communities of Vienna, Tysons, and McLean, the last being the home of the National Counterterrorism Center and the Central Intelligence Agency. The state highway also connects all of the major highways that radiate from Washington, including Interstate 95 (I-95), I-66, US 29, US 50, SR 267, and the George Washington Memorial Parkway. Furthermore, SR 123 crosses another pair of circumferential highways, I-495 and the Fairfax County Parkway, and SR 7, a major northwest–southeast highway through Northern Virginia. The state highway is a part of the National Highway System for its entire length.

== Route description ==
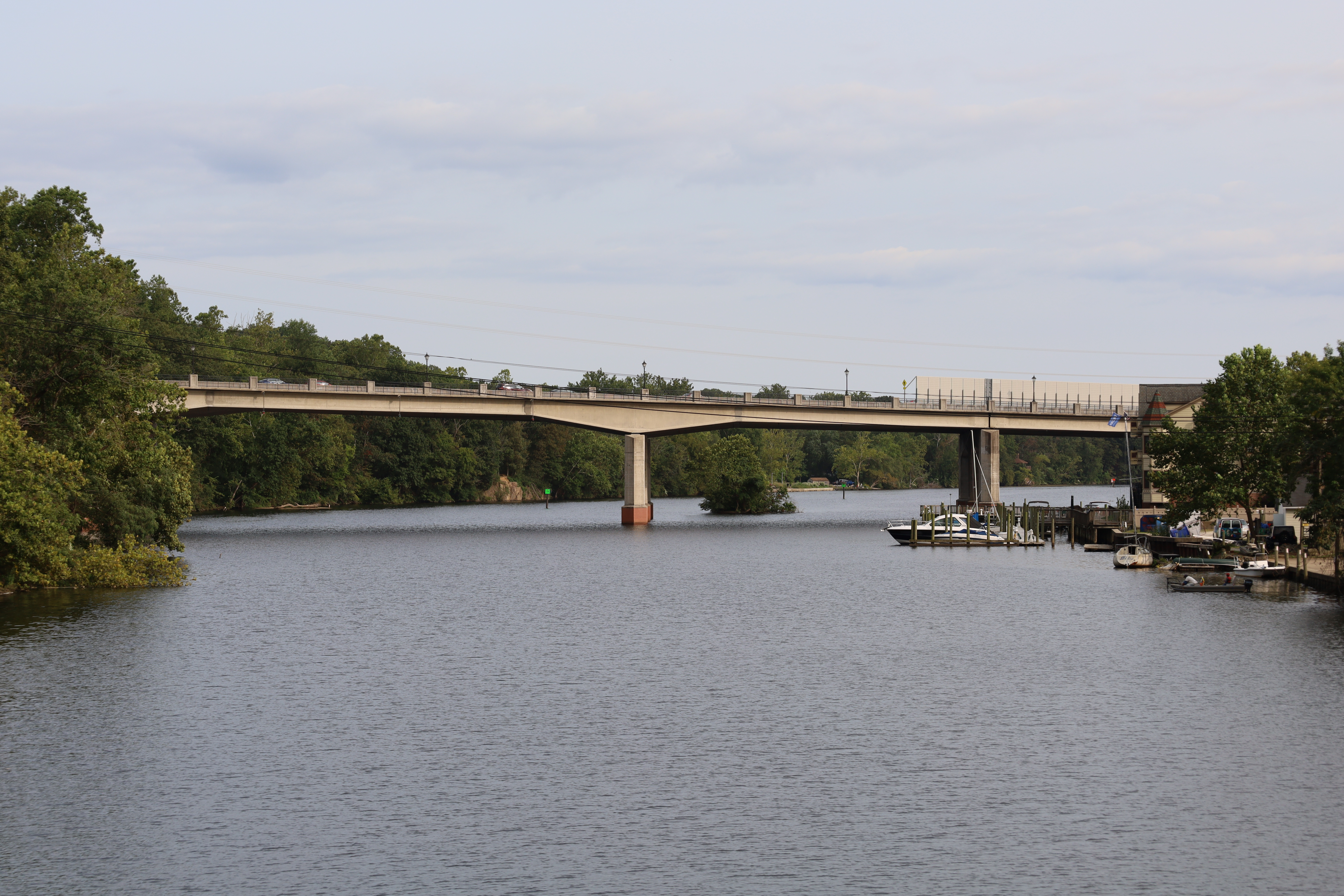
Gordon Boulevard / Ox Road crossing of the Occoquan River at the Prince William–Fairfax County border

SR 123 begins at an intersection with US 1 (Richmond Highway) between the Woodbridge station serving Amtrak and the Fredericksburg Line of Virginia Railway Express station and US 1's bridge over the Occoquan River in Woodbridge. The state highway heads north as Gordon Boulevard, a four- to six-lane divided highway. SR 123 meets I-95 at a partial cloverleaf interchange that contains a reversible ramp to and from the Interstate's HOV lanes in the direction of Washington. There is no access from southbound I-95 to southbound SR 123; that movement is provided indirectly via I-95's interchange with US 1 across the river in Fairfax County. The Route 123 and I-95 Commuter Lot, a park and ride facility, is located within the southeast quadrant of this interchange. Past the interchange, the route heads east of the Occoquan Commuter Lot park and ride. The state highway passes through the eastern edge of the town of Occoquan and crosses the Occoquan River on a six-lane bridge.

SR 123 continues into Fairfax County as Ox Road, which passes through the western part of Lorton. The state highway passes by the former Lorton Reformatory and reduces to four lanes north of SR 611 (Furnace Road). SR 123 passes northwest along the edge of the suburban communities of Laurel Hill, Crosspointe, and South Run. The state highway serves the park surrounding Burke Lake, then veers north through a partial cloverleaf interchange with SR 286 (Fairfax County Parkway) to the west of Burke Centre. SR 123 crosses over Norfolk Southern Railway's Washington District rail line, which also carries the Manassas Line of Virginia Railway Express, at Springfield.

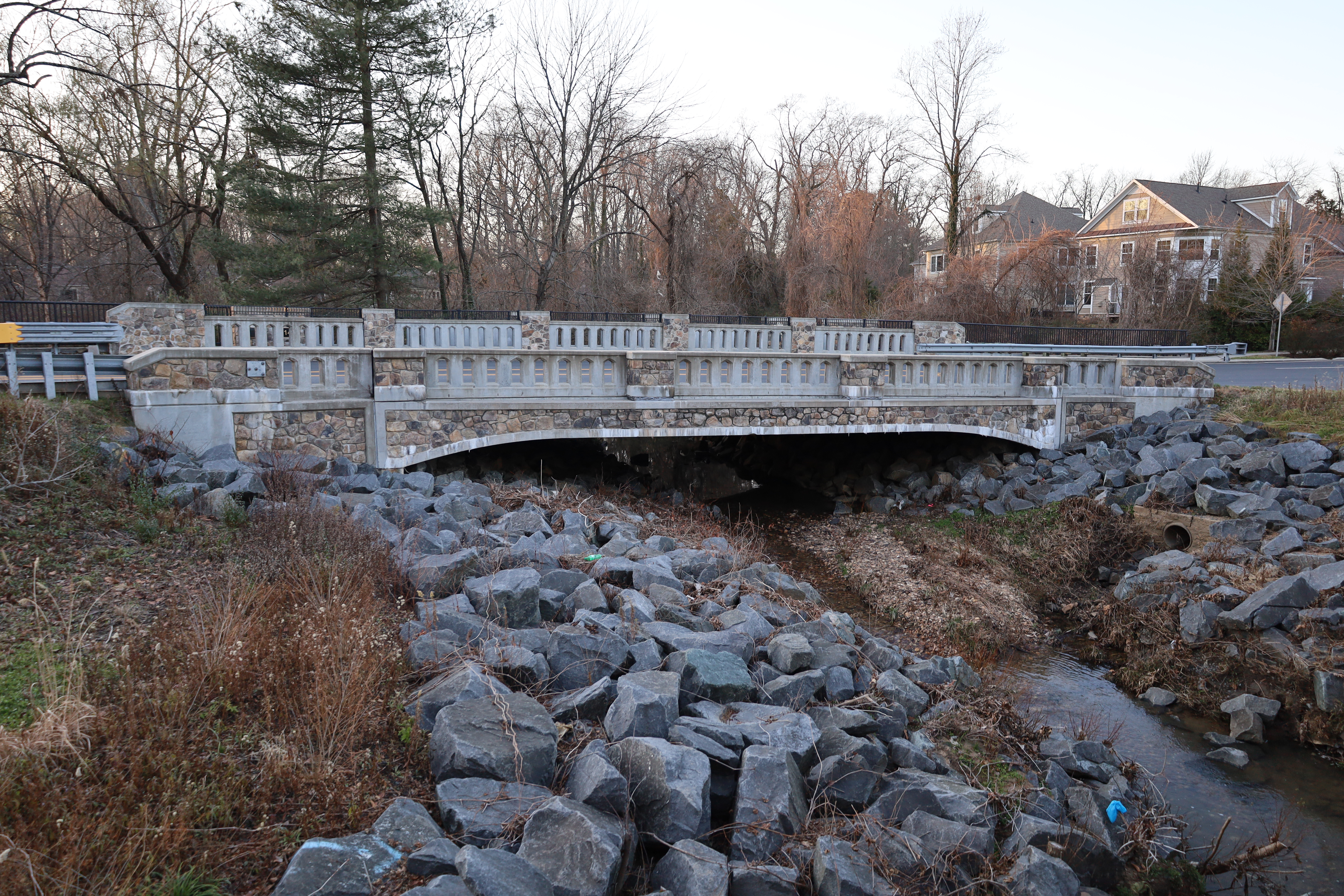
Chain Bridge Road crossing of Accotink Creek north of downtown Fairfax

North of its intersection with SR 620 (Braddock Road), SR 123 passes along the west side of the campus of George Mason University, which includes the EagleBank Arena. The university's athletic complex, including George Mason Stadium, lies to the west of the state highway south of its intersection with University Drive, which heads east onto the campus as SR 383. North of University Drive, SR 123 enters the city of Fairfax and its name changes to Chain Bridge Road. The highway becomes undivided north of Judicial Drive; the state highway passes the Barbour House, the Historic Fairfax County Courthouse, and the Fairfax County offices and judicial center. North of SR 236 (Main Street), SR 123 reduces to two lanes and passes through an S-curve, then heads through a residential area before expanding to a four-lane divided highway at its intersection with US 29 and US 50 (Fairfax Boulevard).

SR 123 leaves the city of Fairfax at its partial cloverleaf interchange with I-66; the interchange includes access to the I-66 Express Lanes in all directions. The state highway curves northeast through Oakton, then enters the town of Vienna and becomes four-lane undivided Maple Avenue just south of its intersection with SR 243 (Nutley Street). SR 123 intersects the Washington and Old Dominion Trail adjacent to the Vienna Town Green. The state highway becomes a divided highway named Chain Bridge Road again on leaving the town limits and entering Tysons, at the southwest edge of which SR 123 has a partial cloverleaf interchange with SR 7 (Leesburg Pike). SR 123 expands to six lanes and begins to parallel Washington Metro's Silver Line and intersects SR 684 (International Drive) before passing between a pair of shopping malls: Tysons Galleria to the north and Tysons Corner Center to the south.

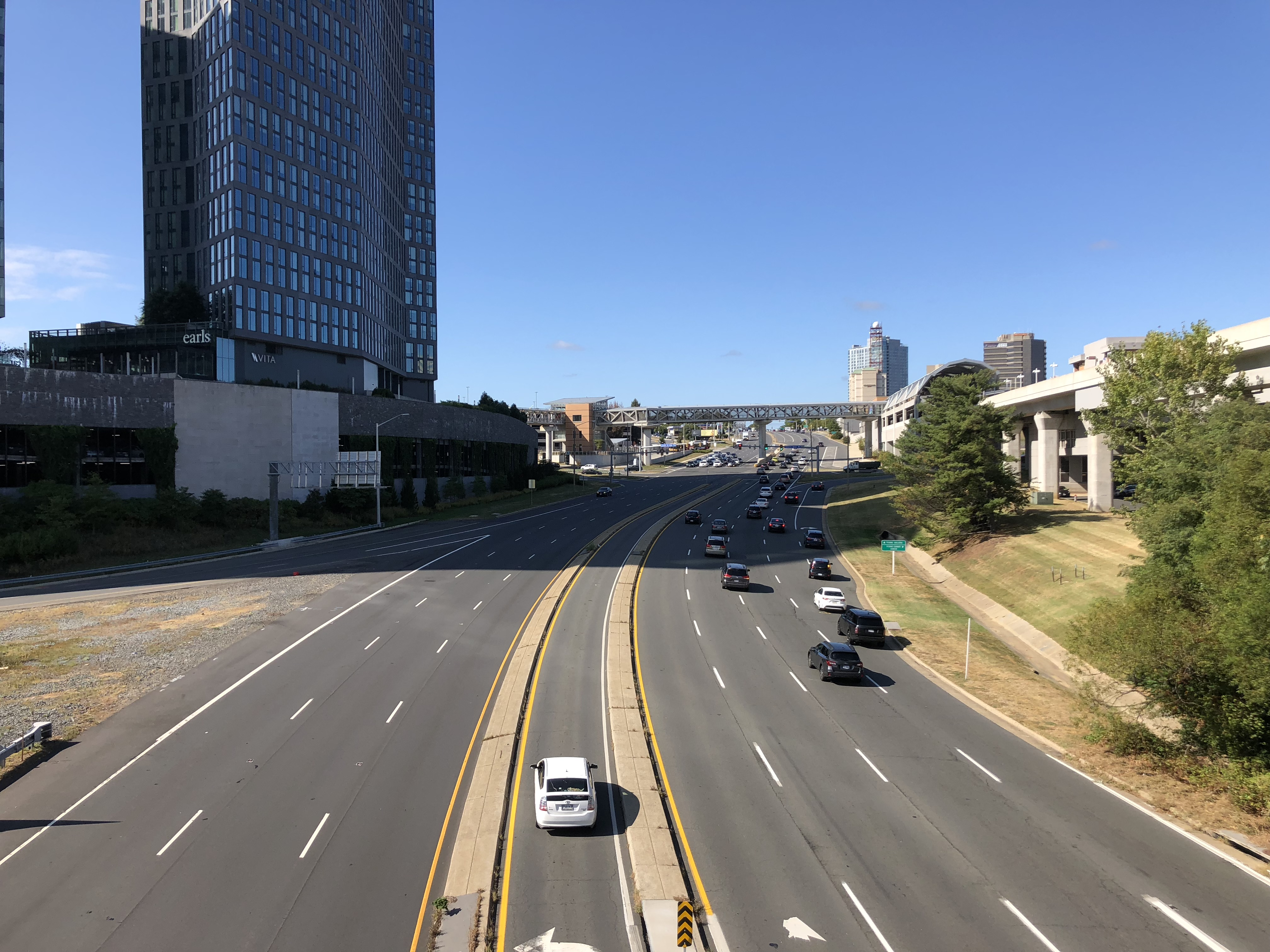
View south along SR 123 from Westpark Drive in Tysons

At the eastern edge of Tysons, SR 123 passes under Westpark Drive has a cloverleaf interchange with I-495 (Capital Beltway). The state highway, now named Dolley Madison Boulevard, follows the Silver Line northeast through office parks to a partial cloverleaf interchange with SR 267 (Dulles Toll Road), which leads west to the Dulles Access Road (unsigned SR 90004) and Washington Dulles International Airport and east to I-66. There is no access from northbound SR 123 to westbound SR 267; that movement requires using I-495. North of the interchange, in the hamlet of Lewinsville, the state highway reduces to four lanes and intersects SR 694 (Lewinsville Road), which provides access to the National Counterterrorism Center. SR 123 passes through McLean, the center of which is accessed via SR 309 (Old Dominion Drive).

East of the center of McLean, SR 123 passes by the preserved Salona estate and close to Hickory Hill—a historic house on Chain Bridge Road that was home to Robert F. Kennedy—in Langley, where the state highway meets the eastern end of SR 193 (Old Georgetown Pike). That state highway provides access to the Claude Moore Colonial Farm on the campus of the George Bush Center for Intelligence, the headquarters of the Central Intelligence Agency. The agency's southern main entrance is on SR 123. East of its partial cloverleaf interchange with the George Washington Memorial Parkway, the state highway's name becomes Chain Bridge Road and reduces to two lanes as it descends into the valley of the Potomac River. SR 123 passes by the Marden House before entering the northwestern corner of Arlington County and meeting the northern end of SR 120 (Glebe Road). There, SR 123 turns north and crosses the Potomac River into Washington on the three-lane Chain Bridge, which leads to the Clara Barton Parkway into Maryland and Canal Road, which follows the river east to Georgetown.

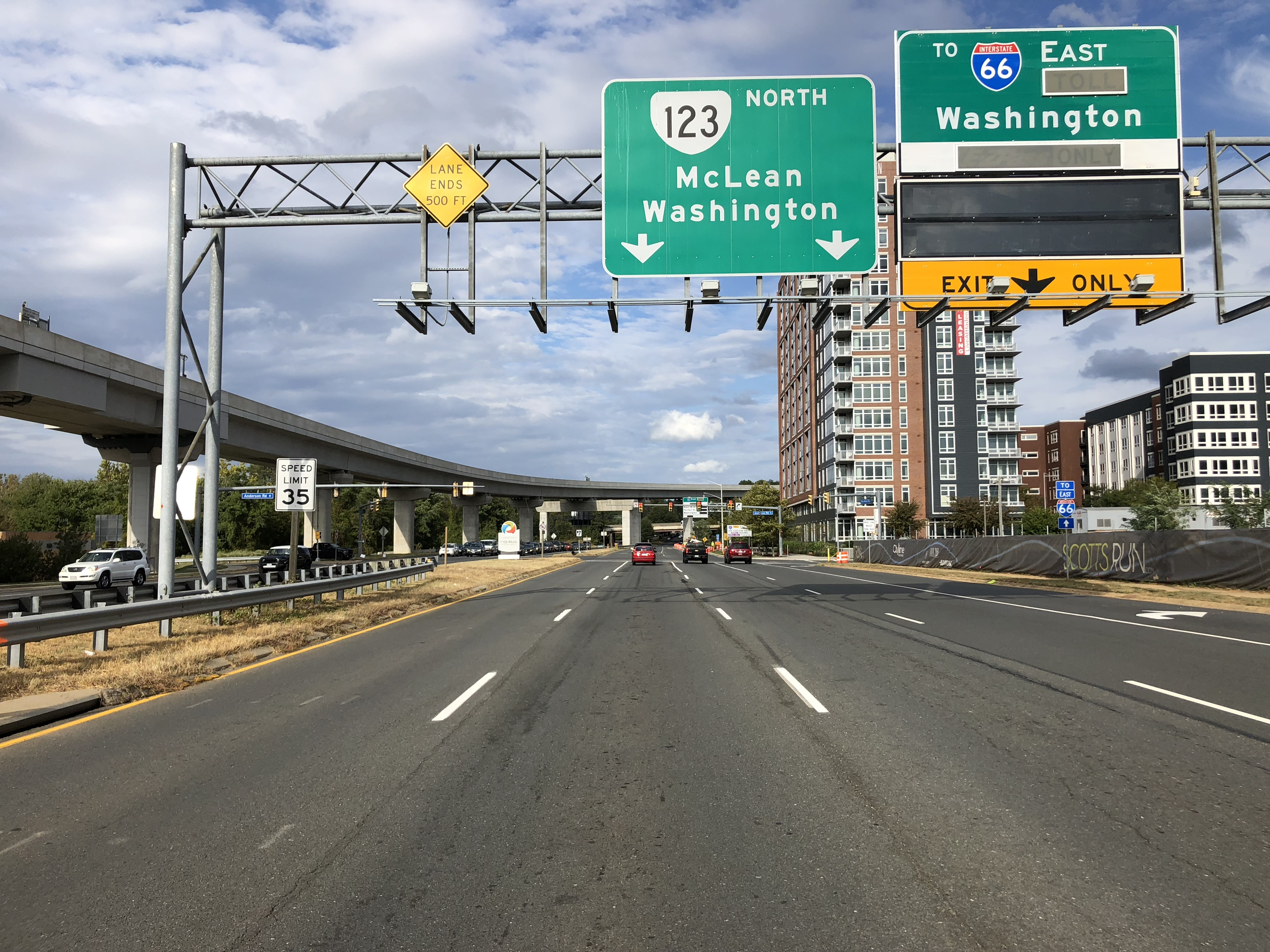
View north along SR 123 at SR 267 in Tysons

== History ==

SR 123, along with SR 120, was SR 25 until the 1933 renumbering and SR 9 from then until the 1940 renumbering.

Fairfax County made proposals to upgrade the intersection between SR 123 and SR 620 to a full interchange. The designs considered were diamond, modified diamond, single-point urban interchange (SPUI), and tight SPUI. Ultimately, one left turn lane in each direction of SR 123 was added at the intersection, the left turn lane on eastbound SR 620 was extended, and new traffic signals were installed.

VDOT has drafted plans to create an interchange between SR 123 and US 1 in Woodbridge. However, due to budget cutbacks, the project has been put on hold.

== Future ==
=== I-66 interchange ===
Due to work on I-66 in Fairfax County to add express lanes, SR 123 north's entrance to I-66 west was temporarily changed from a loop ramp entrance to a left-turn entrance. This has been removed.

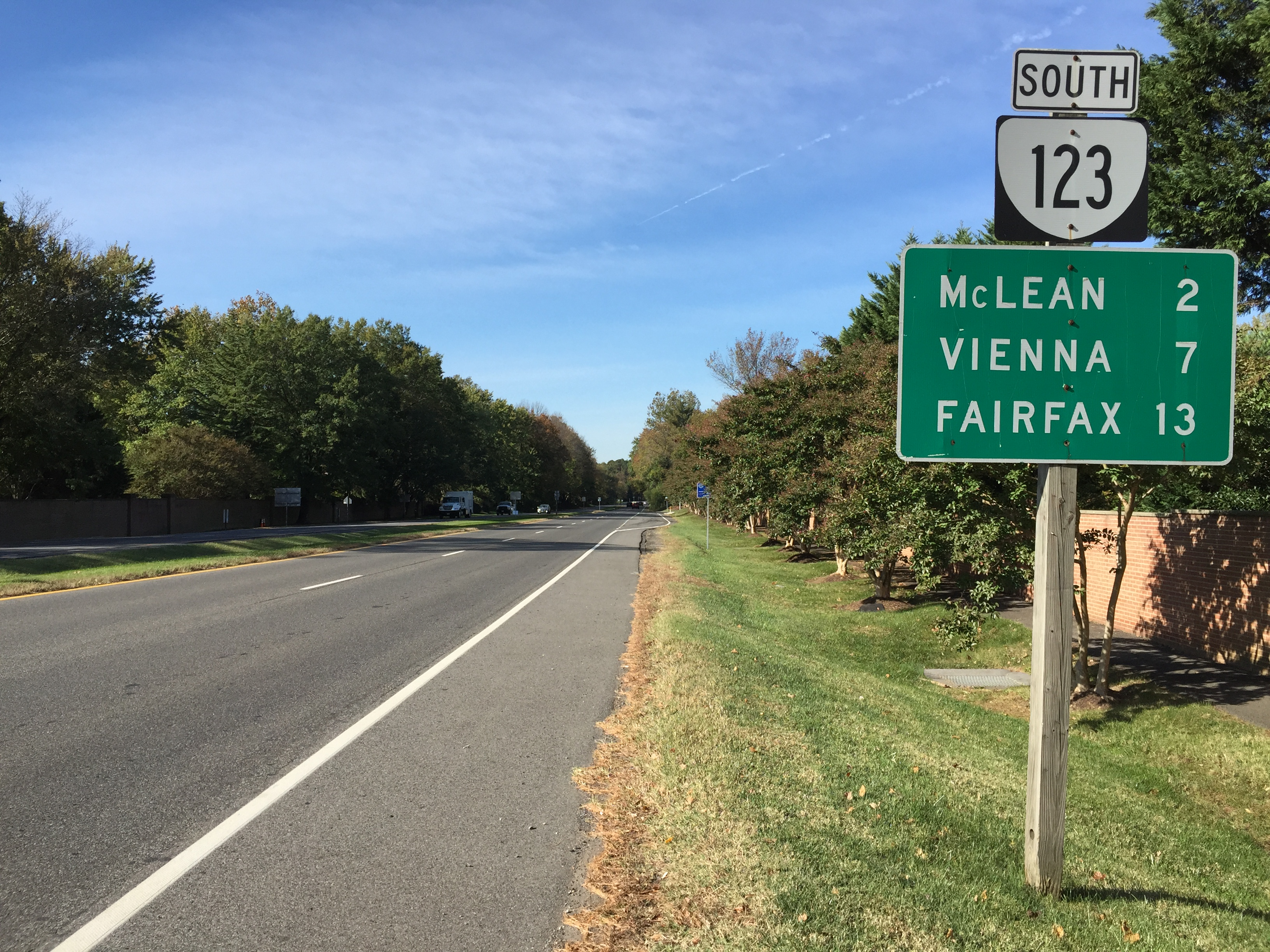
View south along SR 123 at SR 193 in McLean

VDOT also worked on reconstructing the interchange when I-66 express lanes are complete. The existing interchange was converted to a parclo-interchange for access to the I-66 express lanes, and a diamond interchange for access to the non-tolled I-66 lanes, with left exits and entrances for each direction of non-tolled I-66. The reconstruction was completed by the end of 2022.

=== Bridge over SR 7 ===
VDOT is currently working on improving the SR 123 bridges over SR 7. This would improve concrete-deck repairs, new asphalt overlay and paint jobs, and other repairs. The project is expected to cost $2.2 million and will be completed by end of 2020. VDOT started the project to help the bridge reach its expected lifespan, which is expected to be for 10-15 more years.

Fairfax County planners are also researching possible new configurations of the intersection in the future. Options include a quadrant roadway intersection and a continuous flow intersection. Fairfax County DOT has also considered building pedestrian space over the intersection, such as a park, to improve walkability in Tysons Corner.

== Major intersections ==
County	Location	mi	km	Destinations	Notes
Prince William	Woodbridge	0.00	0.00	US 1 (Jefferson Davis Highway) – Lorton, Mason Neck	Southern terminus
Prince William		0.61	0.98	I-95 / I-95 Express north – Fredericksburg, Washington	Exit 160 on I-95
Fairfax	Lorton	3.50	5.63	SR 611 east (Furnace Road)	Western terminus of SR 611
Fairfax		6.60	10.62	Lee Chapel Road (SR 643 east)	
Fairfax		7.60	12.23	SR 643 west (Henderson Road)	
Fairfax	Donovans Corner	8.80	14.16	SR 645 (Clifton Road / Burke Lake Road)	
Fairfax	Butts Corner	10.73	17.27	SR 286 (Fairfax County Parkway) to I-66 / Pohick Road – Reston, Herndon, Springfield	Parclo interchange
Fairfax	Fairfax Station	11.30	18.19	Burke Centre Parkway (SR 643)	
Fairfax	Fairfax Station	12.30	19.79	SR 654 west (Popes Head Road)	Eastern terminus of SR 654
Fairfax	Fairfax Station	12.50	20.12	SR 654 east (Zion Drive)	Western terminus of SR 654
Fairfax	Fairfax Station	13.40	21.57	SR 620 (Braddock Road)	
Fairfax	Fairfax Station	14.22	22.88	SR 383 east (University Drive) – George Mason University	Western terminus of SR 383
City of Fairfax		14.95	24.06	SR 236 (Main Street)	No northbound left turns
City of Fairfax		15.82	25.46	US 29 / US 50 (Fairfax Boulevard / Lee Highway)	
Fairfax	Oakton	16.17	26.02	I-66 – Front Royal, Washington	Exit 60 on I-66 (Custis Parkway)
Fairfax	Vienna	19.33	31.11	SR 243 south (Nutley Street) to I-66	Northern terminus of SR 243
Fairfax	Tysons	22.18	35.70	SR 7 (Leesburg Pike) – Leesburg, Falls Church, Winchester	Parclo interchange
Fairfax	Tysons	23.05	37.10	I-495 – Rockville, Baltimore, Richmond, Alexandria	Exit 46 on I-495 (Capital Beltway)
Fairfax	Tysons	23.89	38.45	SR 267 to I-66 east / I-495 north – Dulles Airport, Washington	No northbound access to SR 267 west; exit 19 on SR 267
Fairfax	McLean	25.09	40.38	SR 309 east / SR 738 west (Old Dominion Drive) – Great Falls, McLean	Western terminus of SR 309
Fairfax	McLean	27.02	43.48	SR 193 west (Georgetown Pike) – Langley, Dranesville, Claude Moore Farm	Eastern terminus of SR 193
Fairfax	McLean	27.90	44.90	George Washington Parkway to I-495	Interchange
Arlington	Arlingwood	29.27	47.11	SR 120 south (North Glebe Road) / Chain Bridge east – Alexandria, Washington	Northern terminus; northern terminus of SR 120
1.000 mi = 1.609 km; 1.000 km = 0.621 mi: Incomplete access

< SR 24	Two‑digit State Routes; 1923-1933	SR 26 >
