= U.S. Route 29 in Virginia =

Highway in Virginia

U.S. Route 29
- 29th Infantry Division Memorial Highway
- US 29 highlighted in red

Route information
- Maintained by VDOT
- Length: 248.0 mi (399.1 km)
- Existed: 1931–present
- Tourist routes: Journey Through Hallowed Ground Byway; Virginia Byway

Major junctions
- South end: Future I-785 / US 29 near Reidsville, NC
- US 58 in Danville; US 460 near Lynchburg; I-64 near Charlottesville; US 250 in Charlottesville; US 33 in Ruckersville; US 522 near Culpeper; US 17 near Warrenton; US 15 in Gainesville; US 50 in Fairfax; I-66 in Arlington
- North end: US 29 in Washington, DC

Location
- Country: United States
- State: Virginia
- Counties: City of Danville, Pittsylvania, Campbell, City of Lynchburg, Amherst, Nelson, Albemarle, City of Charlottesville, Greene, Madison, Culpeper, Fauquier, Prince William, Fairfax, City of Fairfax, City of Falls Church, Arlington

Highway system
- United States Numbered Highway System; List; Special; Divided; Virginia Routes; Interstate; US; Primary; Secondary; Byways; History; HOT lanes
← SR 28	→ SR 30
← I-664	SR 785	→ SR 895

U.S. Route 29 (US 29) is a major north–south route in the commonwealth of Virginia. It covers 248.0 miles (399.1 km) from the North Carolina border at the city of Danville to the Key Bridge in Washington DC. US 29 roughly bisects Virginia into eastern and western halves and, along with Interstate 81 (I-81) and US 11 in western Virginia and I-85/I-95 as well as US 1 farther east, provides one of the major north–south routes through the commonwealth.

Since 1928, when the Virginia General Assembly passed Senate Bill 64, much of US 29 in Virginia is known as the Seminole Trail. Through Northern Virginia, it is known as the Lee Highway, except in Falls Church, where it acts as the east–west divider for city streets and is called North or South Washington Street, Arlington, where it was renamed Langston Boulevard in July 2021 in honor of John Mercer Langston, and Fairfax County, where it was renamed to Route 29 in 2023. On April 7, 1993, the Virginia General Assembly officially designated the entire length of US 29 from the North Carolina border to the Potomac River as the "29th Infantry Division Memorial Highway" in honor of the 29th Infantry Division, which, along with the 1st Infantry Division, formed the spearhead of the U.S. infantry that landed on the morning of June 6, 1944, on Omaha Beach in Normandy as part of the liberation of France during World War II. In addition, the name of this highway serves to honor many members of the Virginia Army National Guard who serve as part of this National Guard Division today. Signs indicating this designation have been placed periodically on both sides of US 29.

For most of its route through Virginia, US 29 has been constructed to be at least four lanes along its route, with the two short exceptions being where the highway passes through Manassas National Battlefield Park, where it is two lanes wide for approximately four miles (6.4 km), and through Fairfax and Arlington counties, where it is sometimes wider. It can also be six and eight lanes in much of northern Albemarle County.

US 29 in Virginia has 11 bypasses around various cities and towns. These bypasses are around Danville, Chatham, Gretna, Hurt–Altavista, Lynchburg–Madison Heights–Amherst, Lovingston, Charlottesville, Madison, Culpeper, Remington, and Warrenton. In addition, I-66 serves for the most part as a bypass of Manassas and also Fairfax and Arlington.

== Route description ==
=== North Carolina to Lynchburg ===
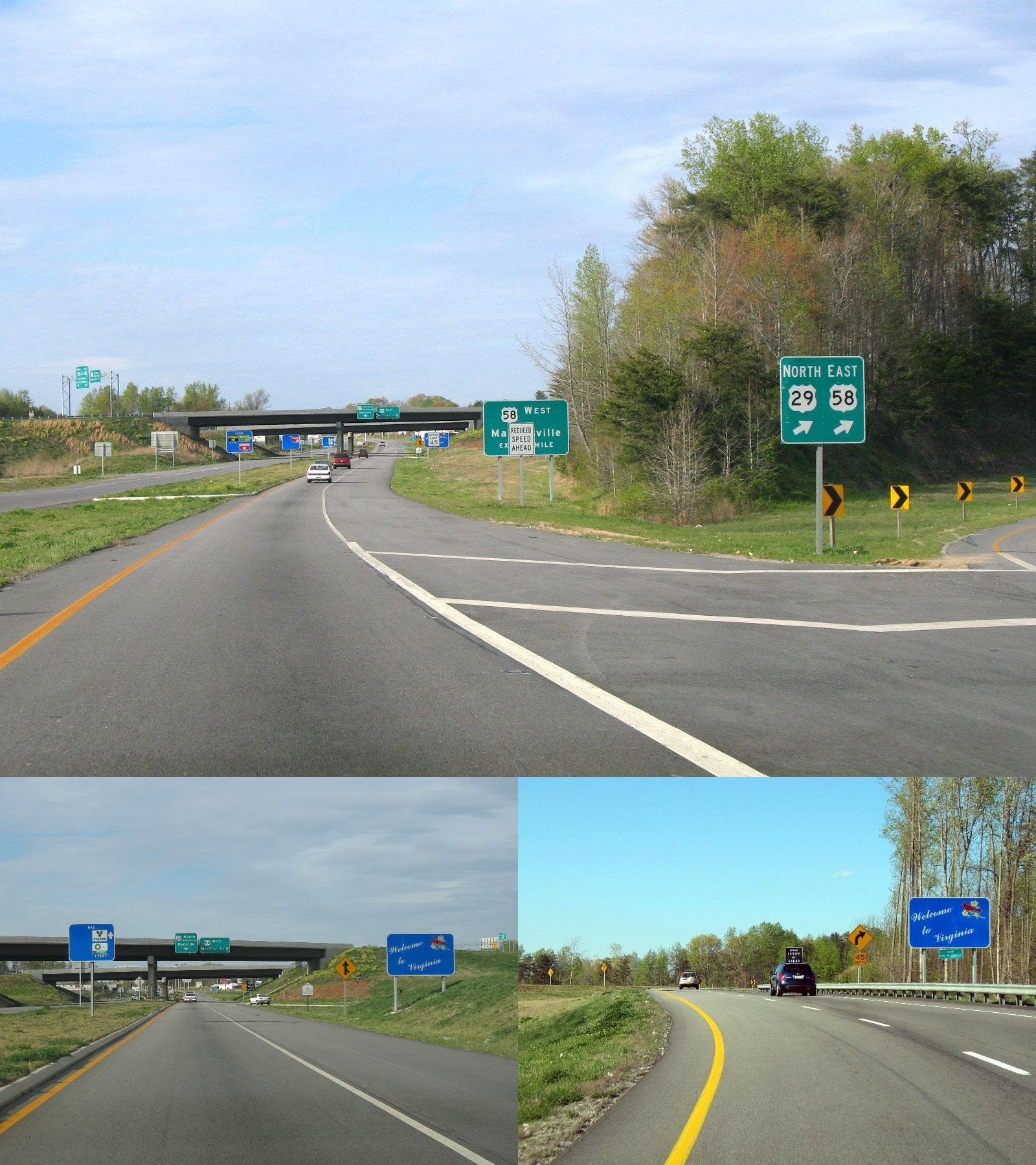
US 29 entering Virginia from North Carolina

US 29 enters Virginia in Danville from North Carolina. While US 29 Business (US 29 Bus.) continues into Danville, US 29 joins the Danville Expressway and US 58 around the east side of Danville, entering Pittsylvania County and remerging with the business route north of town in Blairs. The interchange where US 29 joins US 58 has ramps that enter North Carolina and ramps that enter Virginia, complete with welcome signs from each state. There is a cloverleaf ramp that dips into North Carolina from Virginia and then crosses the state lines back into Virginia. Along the southeastern quadrant of the Danville Expressway between the North Carolina US 360, the route is designated as part of unsigned State Route 785 (SR 785) for 7.39 miles (11.89 km). Created c. 2000, SR 785 is numbered in contradiction to the conventional system of numbering in the state, where primary routes are numbered less than 600 and secondary routes at or above this number. It is numbered as such because it is part of the planned I-785, which will run south along US 29 to I-85 in Greensboro, North Carolina, and is only one of two routes of this type. The other is SR 895 in Richmond for similar reasons.

=== Lynchburg to Charlottesville ===
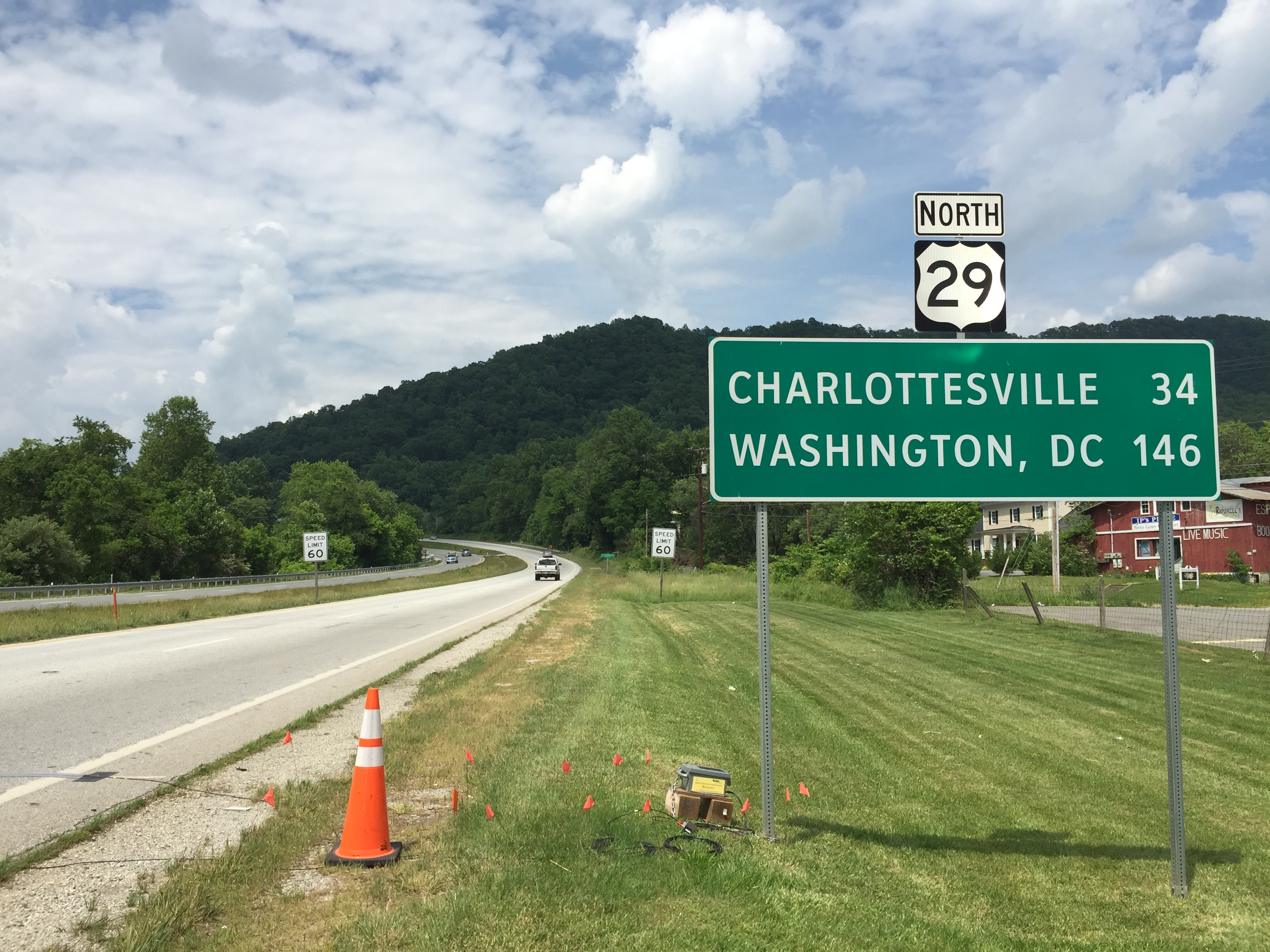
View north along US 29 at US 29 Bus. in Lovingston

US 29 then continues north where it has business routes for Chatham, Gretna, and Hurt while bypassing them before entering Campbell County.

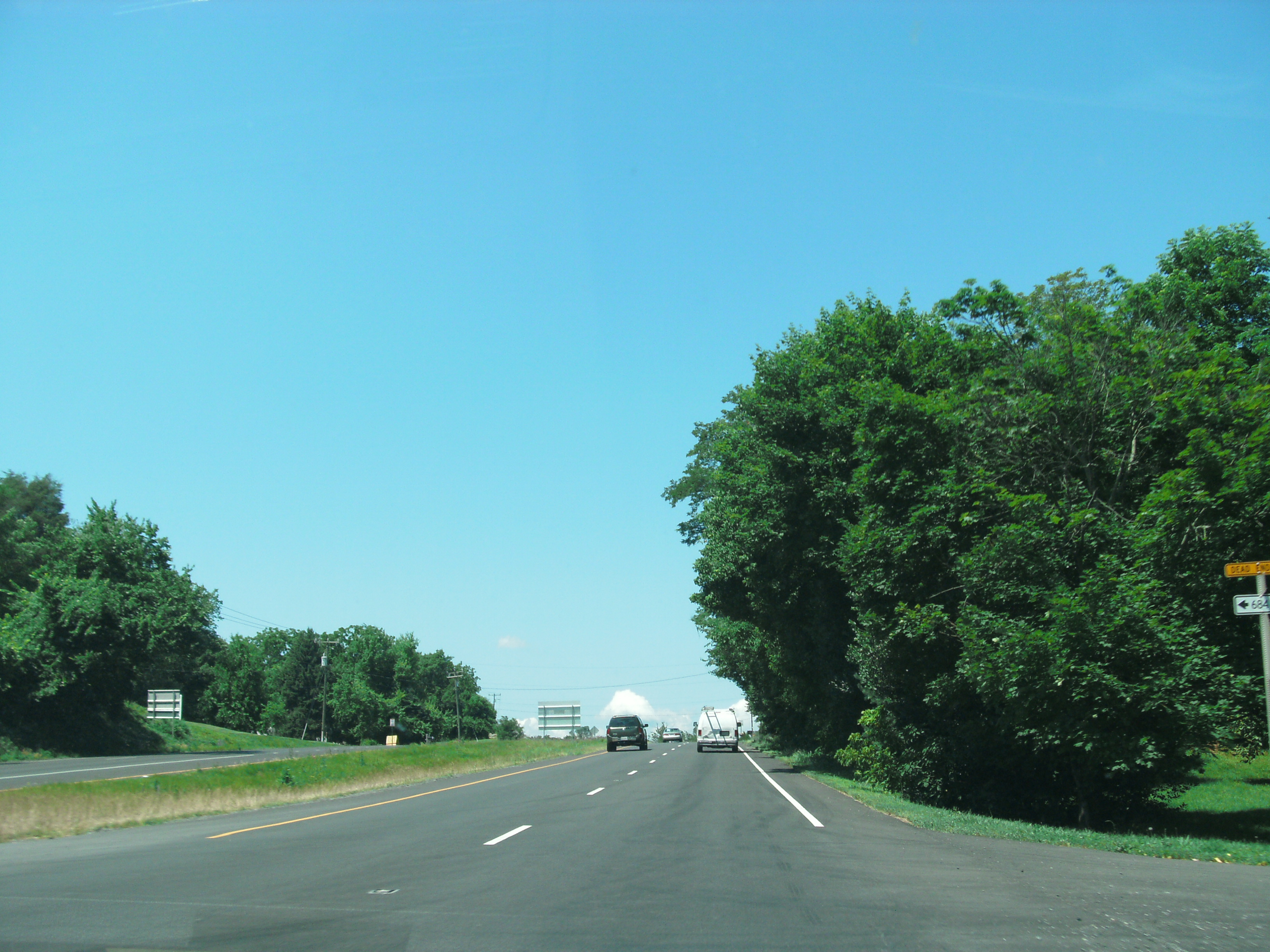
US 29 outside of Gainesville

The next major city is Lynchburg. US 29 joins the US 460 bypass and US 501 east of Lynchburg, splitting from them just before entering Amherst County. US 29 again bypasses Madison Heights and Amherst as an expressway, enters Nelson County, passes the town of Lovingston, and enters into Albemarle County.

=== Charlottesville to Warrenton ===
For the next few miles of US 29's route north of Lovingston, it enters mountainous terrain in the far western Piedmont close to the Blue Ridge Mountains. Several miles later, the route then continues north to Charlottesville, intersecting I-64 and bypassing downtown Charlottesville. US 29 rejoins its congested business route just north of downtown, continuing north as a six-lane road through a commercial area north of the city. Past Charlottesville, it converts back to four lanes and continues through Greene and Madison counties and then turns northeast toward Culpeper. US 15 joins US 29 around Culpeper and heads to Warrenton, entering Northern Virginia.

=== Warrenton to Washington, DC ===
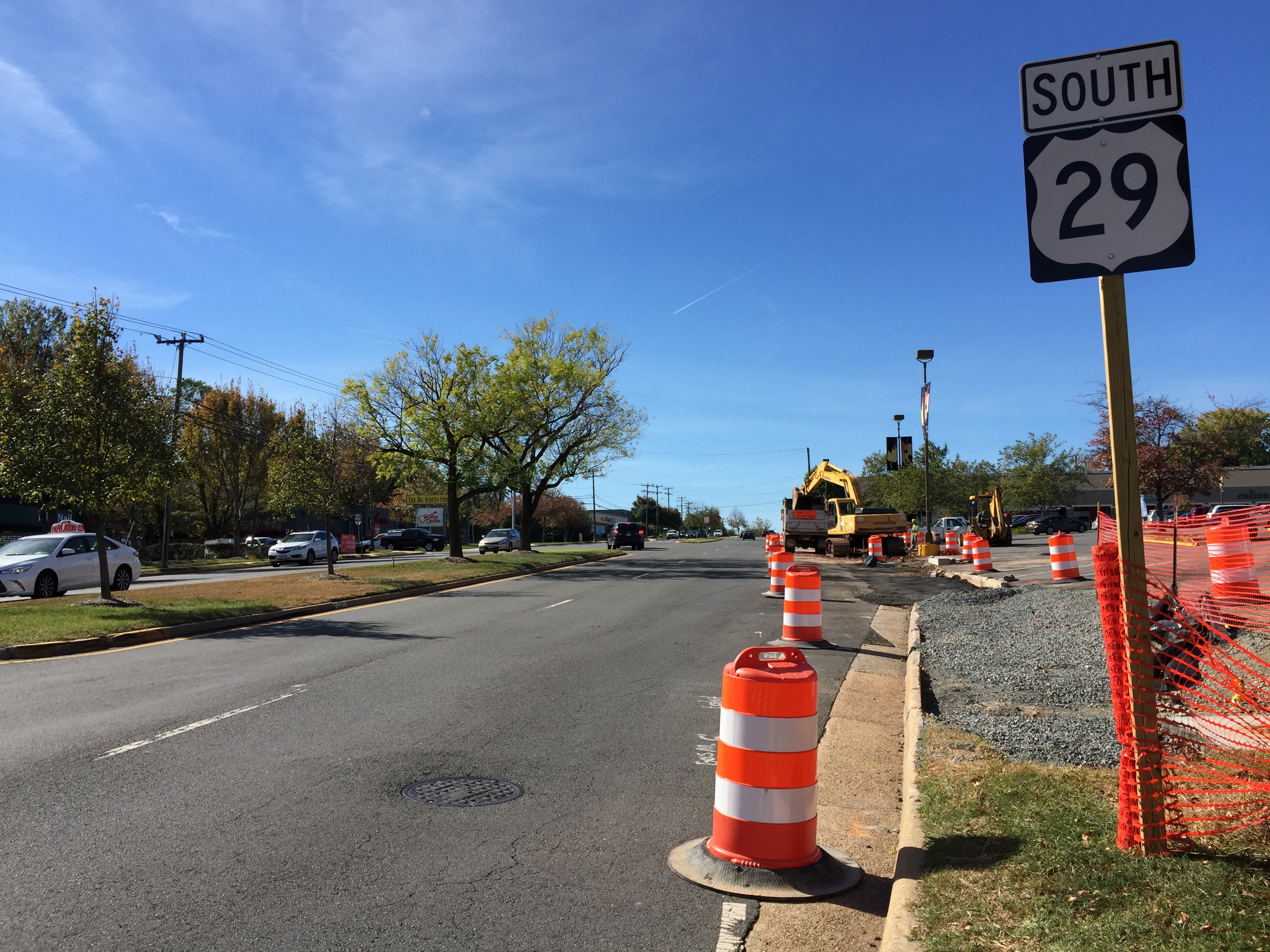
View south along US 29 (Lee Highway) at US 50 (Fairfax Boulevard) and SR 236 (Main Street) in Fairfax

US 29/US 15 is joined by US 17 south of Warrenton in Fauquier County and continues around the town, with US 17 splitting off. US 29/US 15 continues mostly eastward to Gainesville where US 15 splits and US 29 intersects I-66 for the first time. US 29 continues into Fairfax County, where it passes along the boundary of the city of Falls Church, where the road has two different names. The portion of the street running northbound is located in the city of Falls Church is called Washington Boulevard and has different street addresses than the other side running southbound in Fairfax County, where it was named the Lee Highway until 2023 after which it only uses the route number. The road continues into Arlington, having intersected I-66 five more times before crossing into Washington, DC, via the Francis Scott Key Bridge over the Potomac River.

== History ==
US 29 originated in 1931 as a replacement of US 170 from Danville to Lynchburg. It was then added to SR 18 between Lynchburg and Charlottesville and to SR 28 between Charlottesville and Culpeper. The route originally ended at US 15 in Culpeper. In 1934, US 29 was extended to run concurrently with US 15 to Warrenton, and with US 211 to Washington DC (US 211 now ends at US 29 Bus. in Warrenton).

The portion of what is now US 29 from the North Carolina state line to Warrenton was named the Seminole Trail by an act of the Virginia General Assembly on February 16, 1928. Although it was apparently not part of the National Auto Trails initiative early in the 20th century, the Seminole Trail is believed to have originated as part of an effort to promote the road as a through route to Florida, home of the Native American Seminole tribe. Many road maps of the 1930s and 1940s list the Seminole Trail on highways in Virginia, the Carolinas, Georgia, and ultimately Florida.

In an October 4, 2006, meeting of the Albemarle County Board of Supervisors, the University of Virginia athletic department and basketball coach Dave Leitao suggested that Seminole Trail in Charlottesville should be renamed Cavalier Way. The board did not act on this suggestion.

=== Gainesville interchange ===
The Gainesville interchange project took place at the interchange between the Lee Highway (US 29) and I-66 at the junction with Linton Hall Road (SR 619) starting in July 2011, with board planning on it dating back to 2006. The project was worth $230 million (equivalent to $315 million in 2024) and included interchanges at many other heavily traveled roads in the area due to the rapid growth in development in Gainesville and Haymarket, along with it being a major area drivers departure off of I-66 to travel towards other major cities along the Lee Highway, such as Charlottesville. The reasoning for this inclusion of other interchanges is because of the lack of road development to accommodate the new heavy traffic in the area. The plan included a single-point urban interchange design and bridges over train tracks to ease traffic flow on the Lee Highway onto I-66. The Lee Highway was also widened around the interchange to combat this issue. What was once a two-lane country road is now a four-lane suburban highway. Land was acquired by the Virginia Department of Transportation (VDOT) at the intersection of US 29 and Linton Hall Road/SR 619. The entire project was completed and opened to the general public on July 9, 2015.

=== Charlottesville interchange (Rio Road) ===
The Charlottesville interchange project took place at the intersection of US 29 and Rio Road/SR 631, with construction starting in mid-2015 and ending in December 2016. A diamond interchange was built, with two lanes from each direction of US 29, deemed the "local lanes", exiting from main traffic and meeting Rio Road at a traffic signal. The project cost $69.7 million (equivalent to $89 million in 2024).

=== Lynchburg interchange ===
The Lynchburg interchange project took place at the intersection of US 29/US 460/US 501 and Odd Fellows Road, with construction starting in January 2016 and ending in August 2018. A diamond interchange was constructed at a cost of about $30 million (equivalent to $36.8 million in 2024). The interchange was built to reduce congestion on Candlers Mountain Drive/US 501 and to make access to Mayflower Drive/SR 128 easier. As part of the construction, roundabouts were constructed on Odd Fellows Road at its intersection with Mayflower Drive, west of the interchange, and Top Ridge Road, east of the interchange.

=== Charlottesville bypass ===
A western US 29 bypass around Charlottesville was originally proposed in 1979. Engineering and environmental work on the project began in late 1984, and the location was approved by the Commonwealth Transportation Board in 1990.

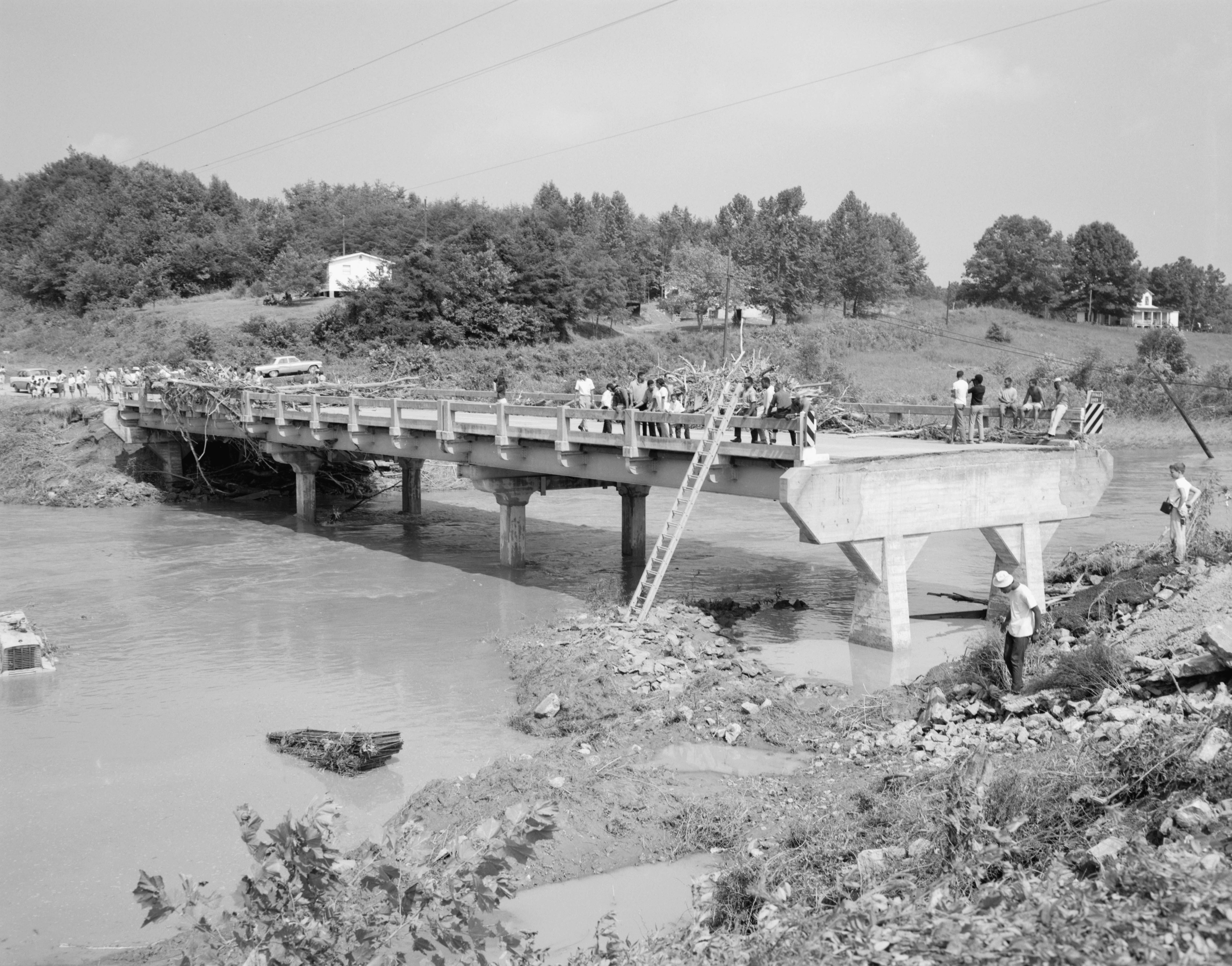
This bridge carried US 29 across the Buffalo River until its destruction by Hurricane Camille in 1969.

Acquisition of right-of-way for the project began in 1991 and continued until 2001. No additional right-of-way has been purchased since then. VDOT owns 36 properties that are currently leased and occupied.

The bypass was projected to be 6.2 miles (10.0 km) long, from the US 250 bypass to current US 29 north of the South Fork Rivanna River. It would have been two lanes in each direction with no other exits, to decrease possible interruption of commercial and residential growth in the area.

In 1998, a lawsuit was filed challenging the project, alleging that the environmental impact review of the project violated the National Environmental Policy Act (NEPA). In 2001, a federal court ruled in favor of VDOT on the suit but required the agency to complete a supplemental environmental impact statement (EIS) addressing the road's impacts on the South Fork Rivanna Reservoir and the mitigation to minimize those impacts. That document was completed and accepted by the Federal Highway Administration (FHWA) in 2003.

In 1996, the Charlottesville-Albemarle Metropolitan Planning Organization (MPO) inserted language into its Transportation Improvement Program that prevented additional funds from being allocated to construction of the western bypass. That language was removed by the MPO Policy Board in July 2011.

All activities on the US 29 Charlottesville bypass project were suspended in March 2014 following notification from the FHWA that a new supplemental EIS would be required before the environmental process could be completed. The new supplemental EIS was required due to the history of litigation and controversy associated with the project.

== Future ==
=== Charlottesville interchange (Hydraulic Road) ===
The Charlottesville City Council voted on May 6, 2018, to add a long-range development plan for a diamond interchange at the intersection of US 29 and Hydraulic Road/SR 743 at an estimated cost of $63 million to $80 million (equivalent to $77.3 million to $98.1 million in 2024).

== Major intersections ==
All exits are unnumbered.

County	Location	mi	km	Exit	Destinations	Notes
City of Danville		0.0	0.0		Future I-785 / US 29 south – Greensboro	Continuation into North Carolina; SR 785 begin
City of Danville		0.1	0.16	–	US 29 Bus. north / US 58 west – Danville, Martinsville	South end of US 58 overlap
City of Danville		0.7	1.1	–	Corning Drive	Southbound exit and northbound entrance
City of Danville		1.3	2.1	–	Elizabeth Street	
City of Danville		3.7	6.0	–	SR 86 (South Main Street) – Yanceyville, Chapel Hill	
City of Danville		5.6	9.0	–	SR 737 (Goodyear Boulevard)	
City of Danville		6.4	10.3	–	River Park Drive – Dan Daniel Memorial Park	
City of Danville		7.2	11.6	–	US 58 east / US 360 / US 58 Bus. west (South Boston Road) – Danville, South Boston, Richmond	North end of concurrency with US 58; future northern terminus of I-785; SR 785 end
Pittsylvania		9.6	15.4	—	SR 41 (East Franklin Turnpike) to SR 360 – Danville, Halifax	
Pittsylvania		15.4	24.8	—	SR 726 to US 29 Bus. – Blairs, Danville	Northbound exit and southbound entrance
Pittsylvania		16.0	25.7	—	US 29 Bus. south to SR 726 – Blairs, Danville	North end of freeway; southbound exit and northbound entrance
Pittsylvania	Chatham	23.4	37.7	—	US 29 Bus. north – Chatham	South end of expressway; northbound exit and southbound entrance
Pittsylvania		24.8	39.9	—	SR 57 – Chatham, South Boston	
Pittsylvania		25.7	41.4	—	SR 685 – Chatham	
Pittsylvania		27.0	43.5	—	US 29 Bus. south to SR 57 west – Chatham	North end of expressway
Pittsylvania		33.0	53.1	—	US 29 Bus. north – Gretna	South end of expressway; northbound exit and southbound entrance
Pittsylvania		35.0	56.3	—	SR 40 – Gretna, Rocky Mount	
Pittsylvania		37.2	59.9	—	US 29 Bus. south – Gretna	North end of expressway; southbound exit and northbound entrance
Pittsylvania		41.6	66.9	—	US 29 Bus. north – Hurt	South end of expressway
Pittsylvania		44.7	71.9	—	SR 924 – Hurt	
Campbell		48.6	78.2	—	SR 43 – Altavista, Leesville	
Campbell		49.5	79.7	—	SR 714 – Altavista	
Campbell	Altavista	50.8	81.8	—	SR 711 (Clarion Road)	
Campbell		51.9	83.5	—	US 29 Bus. south – Altavista	North end of expressway
Campbell	Yellow Branch	61.3	98.7		SR 24 (Colonial Highway) – Evington, Rustburg, Smith Mountain Lake	
Campbell		67.9	109.3		US 460 west / US 29 Bus. north (Wards Road) – Lynchburg, Roanoke	South end of freeway section; south end of concurrency with US 460
City of Lynchburg		68.6	110.4		University Boulevard	Southbound entrance only
City of Lynchburg		69.4	111.7	—	To SR 670 (Candlers Mountain Road) – Liberty University	University Blvd. not signed northbound; SR 670 not signed southbound
City of Lynchburg		70.0	112.7	—	US 501 north (Candlers Mountain Road) – Buena Vista	South end of concurrency with US 501
City of Lynchburg		71.2	114.6	—	Odd Fellows Road	
City of Lynchburg		72.3	116.4	—	US 501 south / US 460 Bus. west / US 501 Bus. north (Campbell Avenue) – South Boston	North end of freeway section; north end of concurrency with US 501
Campbell		74.3	119.6	—	US 460 east (Richmond Highway) – Appomattox	South end of freeway; north end of concurrency with US 460
Amherst		76.0	122.3	—	SR 210 west – Madison Heights, Downtown Lynchburg	
Amherst		80.0	128.7	—	SR 130 west – Madison Heights	
Amherst	Sweet Briar	87.0	140.0	—	US 29 Bus. – Madison Heights, Amherst	
Amherst	Amherst	88.9	143.1	—	US 60 – Amherst, Lexington, Richmond	
Amherst	Amherst	90.3	145.3	—	US 29 Bus. south (Main Street) / SR 739 north (Boxwood Farm Road) – Amherst	North end of freeway; folded diamond interchange; SR 739 is former southern terminus of SR 150
Amherst		92.2	148.4		SR 151 north (Patrick Henry Highway) – Piney River, Afton, Wintergreen	
Nelson		96.7	155.6		SR 739 – Tye River	Former SR 150
Nelson		97.1	156.3		SR 739 south (Napier Loop)	Former northern terminus of SR 150
Nelson	Colleen	100.7	162.1		SR 56 west (Tye Brook Highway) – Piney River	South end of concurrency with SR 56
Nelson	Lovingston	105.0	169.0		US 29 Bus. north / SR 56 east (Front Street) – Lovingston, Shipman	North end of concurrency with SR 56
Nelson	Lovingston	105.8	170.3		US 29 Bus. south (Northside Lane) – Lovingston	
Nelson	Woods Mill	112.3	180.7		SR 6 west (River Road) – Afton, Wintergreen	South end of concurrency with SR 6
Nelson		116.2	187.0		SR 6 east (Irish Road) – Scottsville, Schuyler	North end of concurrency with SR 6
Albemarle	Crossroads	125.5	202.0		SR 692 (Plank Road) – Batesville, North Garden	Former SR 230 north
Albemarle		134.2	216.0	—	I-64 – Staunton, Richmond	South end of freeway; I-64 exit 118
Albemarle		134.8	216.9	—	US 29 Bus. north – Charlottesville, University of Virginia Health System	
Albemarle		136.2	219.2	—	US 250 west / US 250 Bus. east – Waynesboro, Charlottesville, Ivy	South end of concurrency with US 250
Albemarle		136.5	219.7	—	To SR 601	Southbound exit and northbound entrance
Albemarle		136.9	220.3	—	Leonard Sandridge Road – University of Virginia	Northbound exit and entrance only
Albemarle		137.7	221.6	—	SR 654 (Barracks Road)	
City of Charlottesville		138.2	222.4	—	US 250 east / US 29 Bus. south (Emmet Street) – Richmond, University of Virginia	North end of freeway; north end of concurrency with US 250
Albemarle		140.2	225.6		SR 631 (Rio Road) – Charlottesville	Interchange
Albemarle		144.3	232.2		SR 649 (Airport Road / Proffit Road) – Earlysville, Proffit, Charlottesville Albemarle Airport, Sentara Martha Jefferson Hospital	
Greene	Ruckersville	152.1	244.8		US 33 (Spotswood Trail) – Harrisonburg, Richmond	
Greene	Burtonville	155.2	249.8		SR 609 (Fredericksburg Road)	former SR 243 west
Madison		161.4	259.7		SR 230 west (Wolftown–Hood Road) / SR 626 (Gibbs Road) – Stanardsville	South end of concurrency with SR 230
Madison		161.9	260.6		SR 230 east / SR 231 south (Orange Road) – Gordonsville, Orange	North end of concurrency with SR 230; south end of concurrency with SR 231
Madison		163.3	262.8		US 29 Bus. north / SR 231 north (South Main Street) – Madison, Shenandoah National Park, Skyline Drive, Historic Downtown Madison	North end of concurrency with SR 231; northbound exit and southbound entrance
Madison		163.4	263.0		SR 687 (Fairground Road)	former SR 27
Madison		164.2	264.3		SR 634 (Washington Street / Oak Park Road) – Madison, Locust Dale	former SR 230
Madison		165.3	266.0		US 29 Bus. south (North Main Street) / SR 722 (Fishback Road) to SR 231 north – Madison	
Culpeper		179.0	288.1	—	US 29 Bus. north / SR 299 south – Culpeper	South end of expressway
Culpeper		179.9	289.5	—	US 15 south / US 15 Bus. north – Culpeper, Orange	South end of concurrency with US 15
Culpeper		181.4	291.9	—	US 522 / SR 3 – Mineral, Fredericksburg	
Culpeper		183.7	295.6		SR 666 – Culpeper	
Culpeper	Inlet	185.2	298.1	—	US 15 Bus. south / US 29 Bus. south – Culpeper, Brandy Station	North end of expressway
Culpeper		192.1	309.2		US 15 Bus. north / US 29 Bus. north (Remington Road) – Remington	
Fauquier		194.5	313.0		US 15 Bus. south / US 29 Bus. south (James Madison Street) – Remington	
Fauquier		194.8	313.5		SR 28 north (Catlett Road) / SR 657 (Kings Hill Road) – Manassas, Warrenton-Fauquier Airport	
Fauquier	Opal	198.9	320.1		US 17 south (Marsh Road) / SR 687 (Opal Road) to I-95 – Fredericksburg	Interchange; south end of concurrency with US 17
Fauquier		203.6	327.7		US 15 Bus. north / US 17 Bus. north / US 29 Bus. north / SR 880 (Lord Fairfax Road) – Warrenton, Lord Fairfax Community College Fauquier Campus	
Fauquier	Warrenton	205.3	330.4		SR 643 (Meetze Road / Lee Street) – Warrenton	Interchange
Fauquier	Warrenton	206.5	332.3		US 17 north / US 15 Bus. south / US 29 Bus. south to I-66 west / I-81 / US 211 west – Winchester, Warrenton, Luray	Interchange; north end of concurrency with US 17
Fauquier	Buckland	213.0	342.8		SR 215 east (Vint Hill Road) – Vint Hill Farms Station, Lake Brittle	
Prince William		214.0	344.4		US 15 north (James Madison Highway) – Leesburg	North end of concurrency with US 15
Prince William	Gainesville	217.0	349.2		SR 55 west (John Marshall Highway) / SR 619 east (Linton Hall Road) – Haymarket, Front Royal	Interchange
Prince William	Gainesville	217.8	350.5		I-66 – Front Royal, Washington	Interchange; I-66 exit 43
Prince William	Manassas National Battlefield Park	221.8	357.0		SR 234 (Sudley Road) to I-66 – Visitor Center, NVCC, Manassas	
Fairfax	Bull Run	224.7	361.6		SR 609 (Pleasant Valley Road)	
Fairfax	Centreville	226.3	364.2		I-66 – Washington, Front Royal	I-66 exit 52
Fairfax	Centreville	227.2	365.6		SR 28 to I-66 east – Dulles Airport, Manassas	
Fairfax	Willow Springs	228.6	367.9		SR 645 (Stringfellow Road / Clifton Road) – Clifton	
Fairfax		230.3	370.6		SR 286 (Fairfax County Parkway) / SR 608 (West Ox Road) to I-66	Interchange
Fairfax	Jermantown	232.3	373.9		SR 655 south (Shirley Gate Road) / SR 665 (Waples Mill Road) to I-66 / I-495 / SR 123 south – George Mason University	
City of Fairfax		233.1	375.1		US 50 west / SR 236 east (Fairfax Boulevard / Main Street) to I-66 – Old Town Fairfax	South end of concurrency with US 50
City of Fairfax		234.0	376.6		SR 123 (Chain Bridge Road) to I-66 – Old Town Fairfax, George Mason University	
City of Fairfax		235.8	379.5		US 50 east / SR 237 west (Fairfax Boulevard) / Blenheim Blvd	Fairfax Circle (traffic circle with cut-through); north end of concurrency with US 50; south end of concurrency with SR 237
Fairfax		236.0	379.8		SR 655 (Blake Lane) to SR 236 (Pickett Road)	
Fairfax	Merrifield	236.7	380.9		SR 243 north (Nutley Street) to I-66 – Vienna/Fairfax-GMU Station	
Fairfax	Merrifield	238.7	384.2		SR 650 (Gallows Road) to I-495	
Fairfax		239.0	384.6		I-495 Express south	
City of Falls Church		241.5	388.7		SR 338 east (Hillwood Avenue)	
City of Falls Church		241.8	389.1		SR 7 (Broad Street)	
Arlington	East Falls Church	242.4	390.1		SR 237 east to I-66 west	North end of concurrency with SR 237
Arlington	Glebewood	244.6	393.6		SR 120 (North Glebe Road) – Chain Bridge, Alexandria	
Arlington	Waverly Hills	244.7	393.8		SR 309 west (Old Dominion Drive) to SR 120 – McLean	South end of concurrency with SR 309; no left turn northbound
Arlington	Waverly Hills	244.8	394.0		SR 309 east (Cherry Hill Road) / to Lorcom Lane	North end of concurrency with SR 309
Arlington	Cherrydale	245.5	395.1		SR 309 west (Cherry Hill Road) / Military Road / Quincy Street	Eastern terminus of SR 309
Arlington	Lyon Village	246.1	396.1		I-66 west – Front Royal, Dulles Airport	I-66 exit 72
Arlington	Lyon Village	246.2	396.2		SR 124 east (Spout Run Parkway) / Kirkwood Road	Western terminus of SR 124
Arlington	Rosslyn	247.0	397.5		I-66 west to SR 267	I-66 exit 74; southbound exit and northbound entrance
Arlington	Rosslyn	247.6	398.5		I-66 east to I-395	I-66 exit 74
Arlington	Rosslyn	247.7	398.6		George Washington Parkway north to I-495	No southbound entrance
Potomac River		248.0	399.1		US 29 north (Key Bridge) – Washington	Continuation into the District of Columbia
1.000 mi = 1.609 km; 1.000 km = 0.621 mi: Concurrency terminus; Electronic toll collection; Incomplete access

== See also ==
- Special routes of U.S. Route 29
- Missing persons cases along U.S. Route 29 in Virginia

U.S. Route 29
Previous state: North Carolina	Virginia	Next state: District of Columbia
