= Burke Centre, Virginia =

Burke Centre, VA
- Census-designated place (CDP)
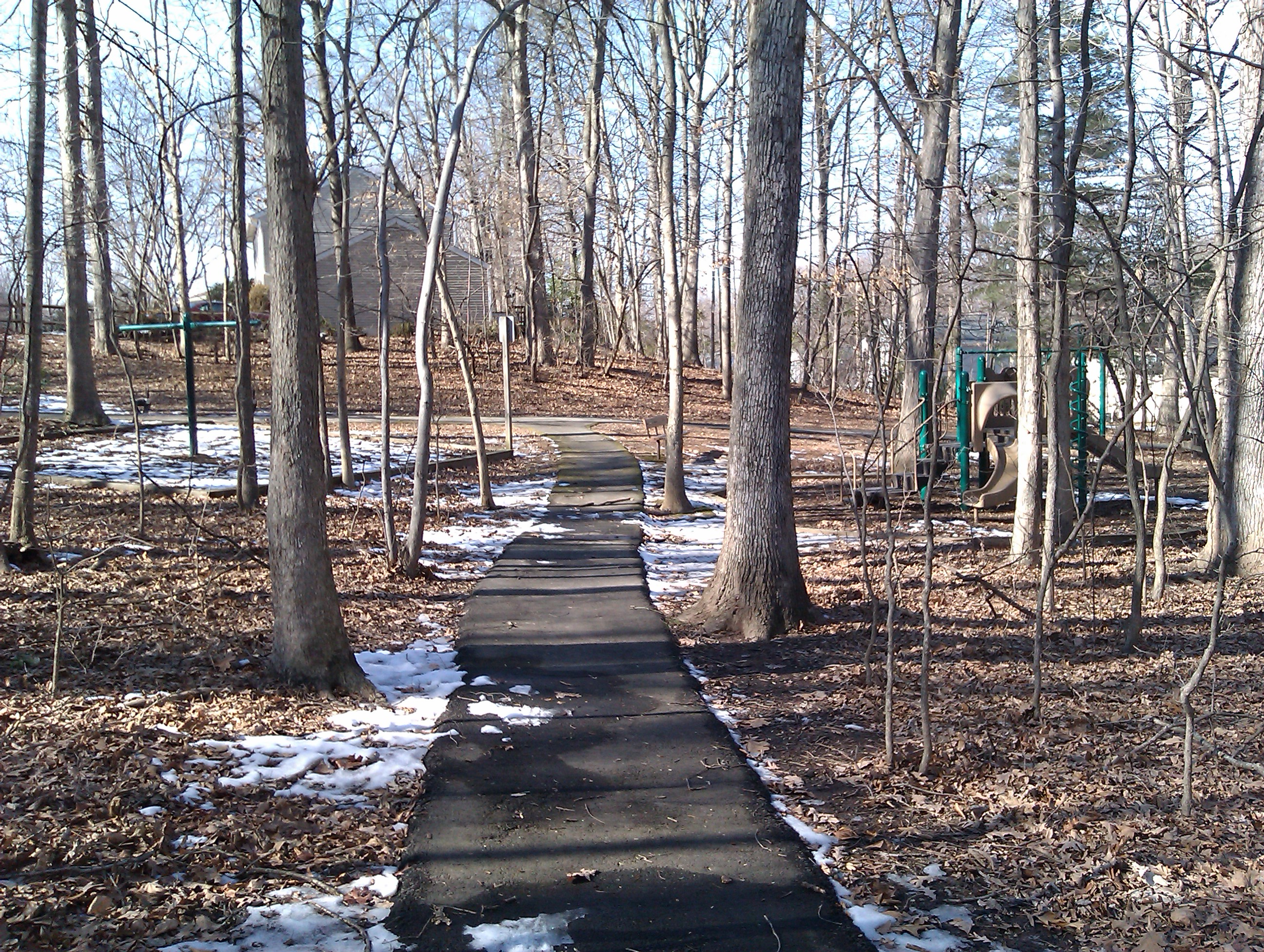
- Path in the woods, Burke Centre
- Nickname: Burke Centre
- Burke, Virginia. Burke Centre is the western part of the red area on this map.

- Location within Northern Virginia Location within Virginia Location within the United States
- Coordinates: 38°47′28″N 77°18′02″W
- Country: United States
- State: Virginia
- County: Fairfax

Area
  - Total: 3.16 sq mi (8.19 km^{2})
  - Land: 3.12 sq mi (8.09 km^{2})
  - Water: 0.042 sq mi (0.11 km^{2})
- Elevation: 381 ft (116 m)

Population (2020)
  - Total: 17,518
  - Density: 5,608/sq mi (2,165.4/km^{2})
- Time zone: UTC−5 (Eastern (EST))
  - Summer (DST): UTC−4 (EDT)
- ZIP codes: 22015
- Area codes: 703, 571
- FIPS code: 51-11470
- GNIS feature ID: 2584818

Burke Centre is a planned residential community located west of Burke, Virginia, United States. Burke Centre is a planned community managed by the Burke Centre Conservancy homeowners' association (HOA).

Burke Centre is also the name of a census-designated place (CDP). The CDP boundaries extend beyond the planned community limits. At the 2020 census, the Burke Centre CDP had a total population of 17,518.

Burke Centre is located south of the center of Fairfax County. It is bordered to the east and partially to the north by the Burke CDP, and to the west and north by the Fairfax Station CDP. The Burke Centre CDP border follows Ox Road to the west, the VRE Manassas Line to the north, Burke Lake Road to the southeast, and Fairfax County Parkway to the southwest.

== Neighborhoods ==
Burke Centre is divided into five neighborhoods: The Woods, The Oaks, the Commons, the Ponds, and the Landings. Each neighborhood's name appears frequently in streets within its boundaries (e.g. the Woods neighborhood contains Wooden Hawk Lane, Walnut Wood Court, etc.). Not all streets contain the neighborhood name, however. Additionally, each neighborhood has one public pool and one community center, generally located on the same lot.

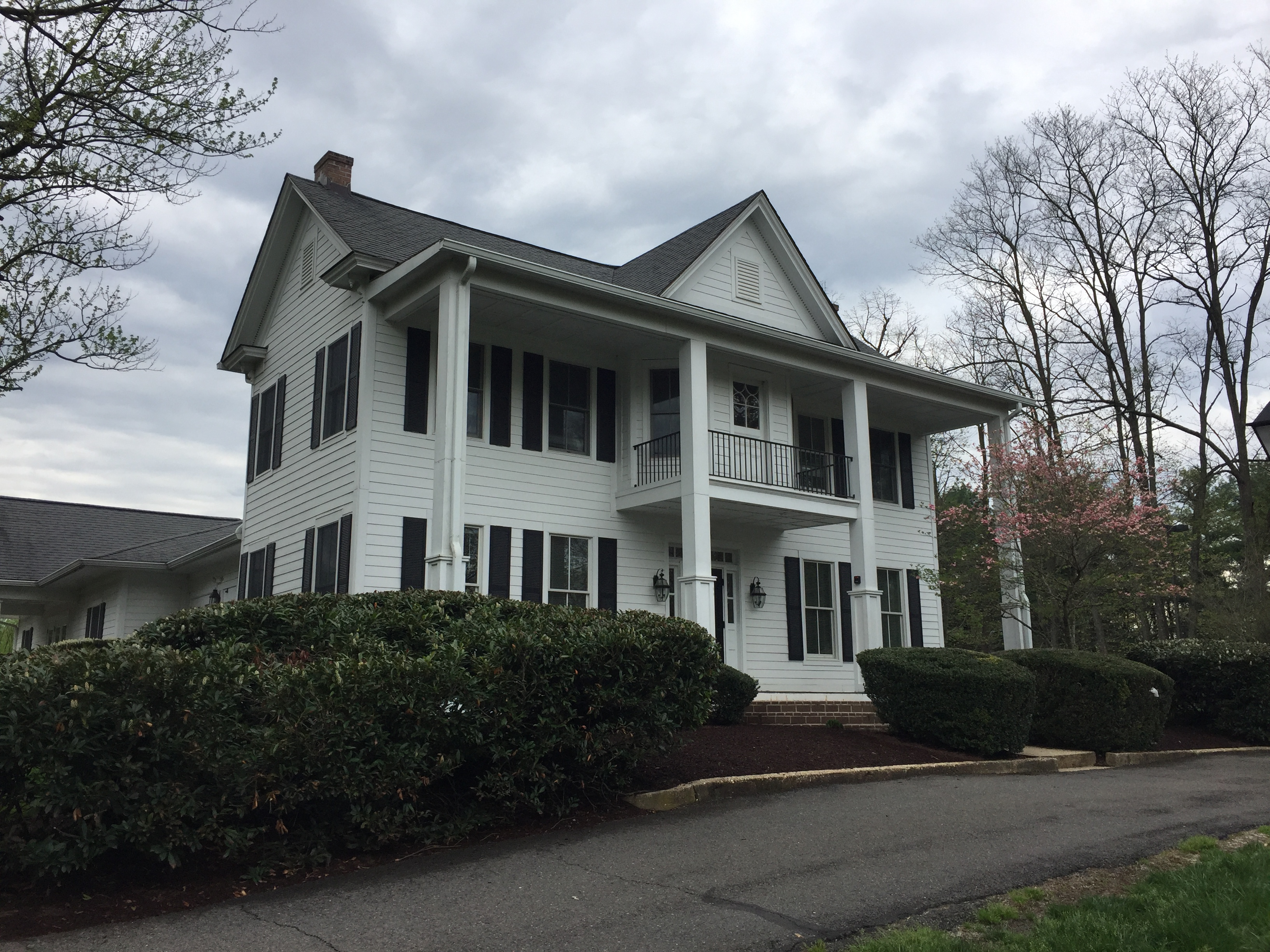
Burke Centre's historic Huldah Coffer House

The locations of each neighborhood is as follows:

- The Ponds is bound by Burke Centre Parkway to the north, Burke Lake Road to the east and south, Roberts Parkway to the west, and Fairfax County Parkway (SR 286) to the southwest.
- The Woods is just north of Burke Centre Parkway, across from The Ponds; it is bordered by The Commons to the west and Burke Lake Road to the east.
- The Commons is located primarily around Burke Commons Road, which runs mostly parallel with Roberts Parkway. It is bound by The Woods to the east and The Landings to the west.
- The Landings is west of Roberts Parkway, and exists on both sides of Burke Centre Parkway. It is constrained by Fairfax County Parkway (SR 286) to the south and The Oaks to the west.
- The Oaks is just west of The Landings; it borders The Landings to the east, Ox Road (SR 123) to the west, and Fairfax County Parkway (SR 286) to the south.

== Demographics ==
Historical population
| Census | Pop. | Note | %± |
|---|---|---|---|
| 2010 | 17,326 | | — |
| 2020 | 17,518 | | 1.1% |
U.S. Decennial Census; 2010 2020

Burke Centre was first listed as a census designated place in the 2010 U.S. census formed from part of the Burke CDP.

=== Racial and ethnic composition ===
Burke Centre CDP, Virginia – Racial and ethnic composition Note: the US Census treats Hispanic/Latino as an ethnic category. This table excludes Latinos from the racial categories and assigns them to a separate category. Hispanics/Latinos may be of any race.
| Race / Ethnicity (NH = Non-Hispanic) | Pop 2010 | Pop 2020 | % 2010 | % 2020 |
|---|---|---|---|---|
| White alone (NH) | 10,805 | 9,936 | 62.36% | 56.72% |
| Black or African American alone (NH) | 993 | 1,071 | 5.73% | 6.11% |
| Native American or Alaska Native alone (NH) | 24 | 18 | 0.14% | 0.10% |
| Asian alone (NH) | 2,631 | 2,755 | 15.19% | 15.73% |
| Native Hawaiian or Pacific Islander alone (NH) | 16 | 16 | 0.09% | 0.09% |
| Other race alone (NH) | 51 | 106 | 0.29% | 0.61% |
| Mixed race or Multiracial (NH) | 592 | 1,053 | 3.42% | 6.01% |
| Hispanic or Latino (any race) | 2,214 | 2,563 | 12.78% | 14.63% |
| Total | 17,326 | 17,518 | 100.00% | 100.00% |

=== 2020 census ===
As of the 2020 census, Burke Centre had a population of 17,518. The median age was 40.1 years. 24.6% of residents were under the age of 18 and 15.7% were 65 years of age or older. For every 100 females there were 92.7 males, and for every 100 females age 18 and over there were 90.0 males age 18 and over.

100.0% of residents lived in urban areas, while 0.0% lived in rural areas.

There were 6,110 households in Burke Centre, of which 39.5% had children under the age of 18 living in them. Of all households, 62.2% were married-couple households, 11.6% were households with a male householder and no spouse or partner present, and 22.8% were households with a female householder and no spouse or partner present. About 18.6% of all households were made up of individuals and 8.4% had someone living alone who was 65 years of age or older.

There were 6,247 housing units, of which 2.2% were vacant. The homeowner vacancy rate was 0.5% and the rental vacancy rate was 2.7%.

=== Demographic estimates ===
The population density was 5,614.7 inhabitants per square mile (2,165.4/km^{2}). The average housing unit density was 2,002.2 per square mile (772.2/km^{2}).

The average family household had 3.33 people.

In 2022 American Community Survey estimates, 15.3% had German ancestry, 30.2% spoke a language other than English at home, and 21.3% were born outside the United States, 68.9% of whom were naturalized citizens.

=== Income and poverty ===
The median income for a household in the CDP was $156,421, and the median income for a family was $175,833. 9.7% of the population were military veterans, and 67.8% had a bachelor's degree or higher. In the CDP 5.2% of the population was below the poverty line, including 1.7% of those under age 18 and 3.9% of those age 65 or over, with 6.1% of the population without health insurance.

=== 2010 census ===
At the 2010 census, the Burke Centre CDP had a total population of 17,326.
