= Virginia State Route 309 =

State highway in Virginia, United States

State Route 309

Route information
- Maintained by VDOT
- Length: 5.33 mi (8.58 km)
- Existed: 1937–present

Major junctions
- West end: SR 123 / SR 738 in McLean
- SR 120 in Arlington
- East end: US 29 in Arlington

Location
- Country: United States
- State: Virginia
- Counties: Fairfax, Arlington

Highway system
- Virginia Routes; Interstate; US; Primary; Secondary; Byways; History; HOT lanes
← SR 308	→ SR 310

State Route 309 (SR 309) is a primary state highway in the U.S. state of Virginia. Known for most of its length as Old Dominion Drive, which was once the right of way of the Great Falls Division of the Washington and Old Dominion Railroad, the state highway runs 5.33 miles (8.58 km) from SR 123 in McLean east to U.S. Route 29 (US 29) in Arlington.

== Route description ==
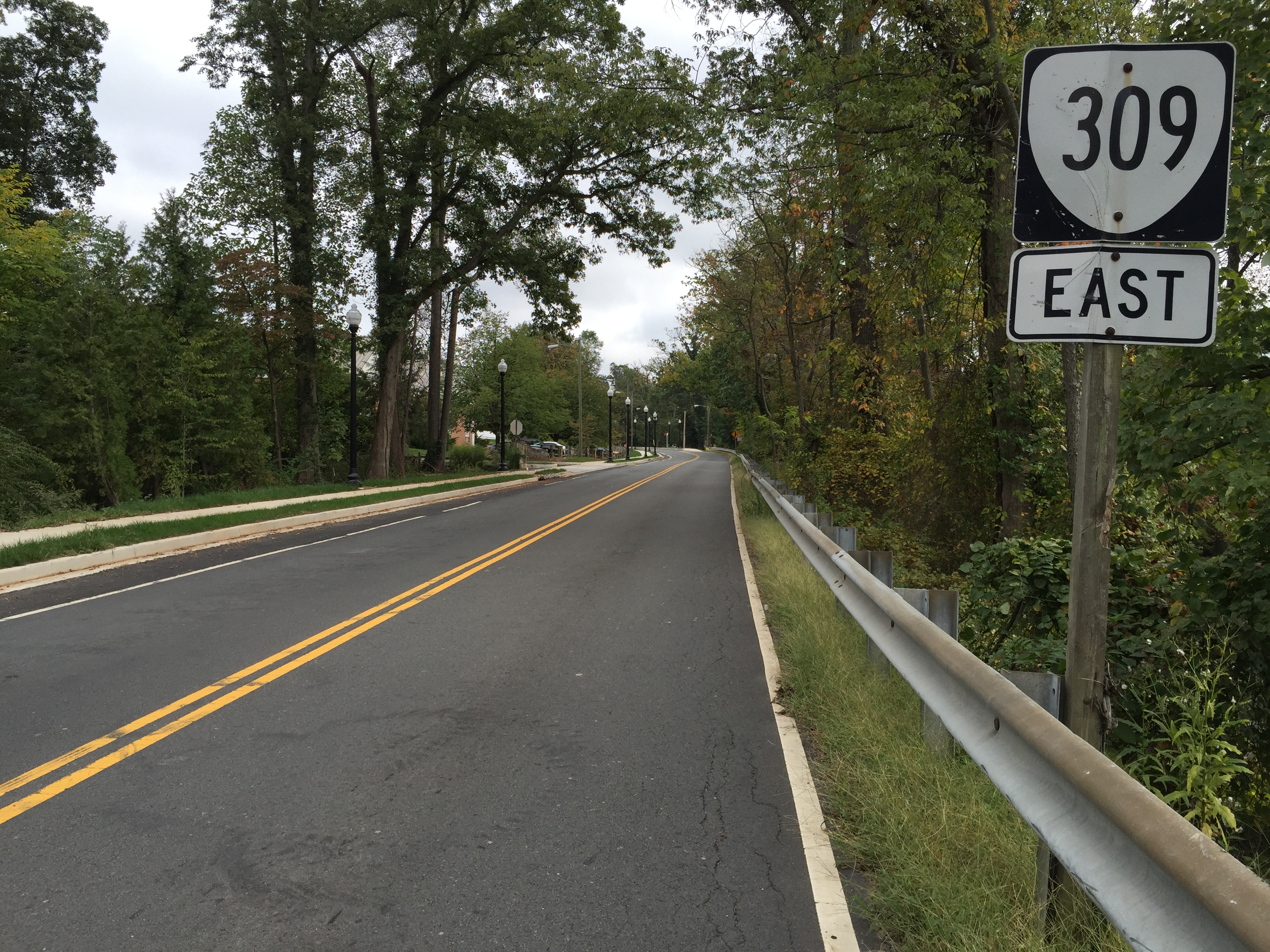
View east along SR 309 in Arlington County

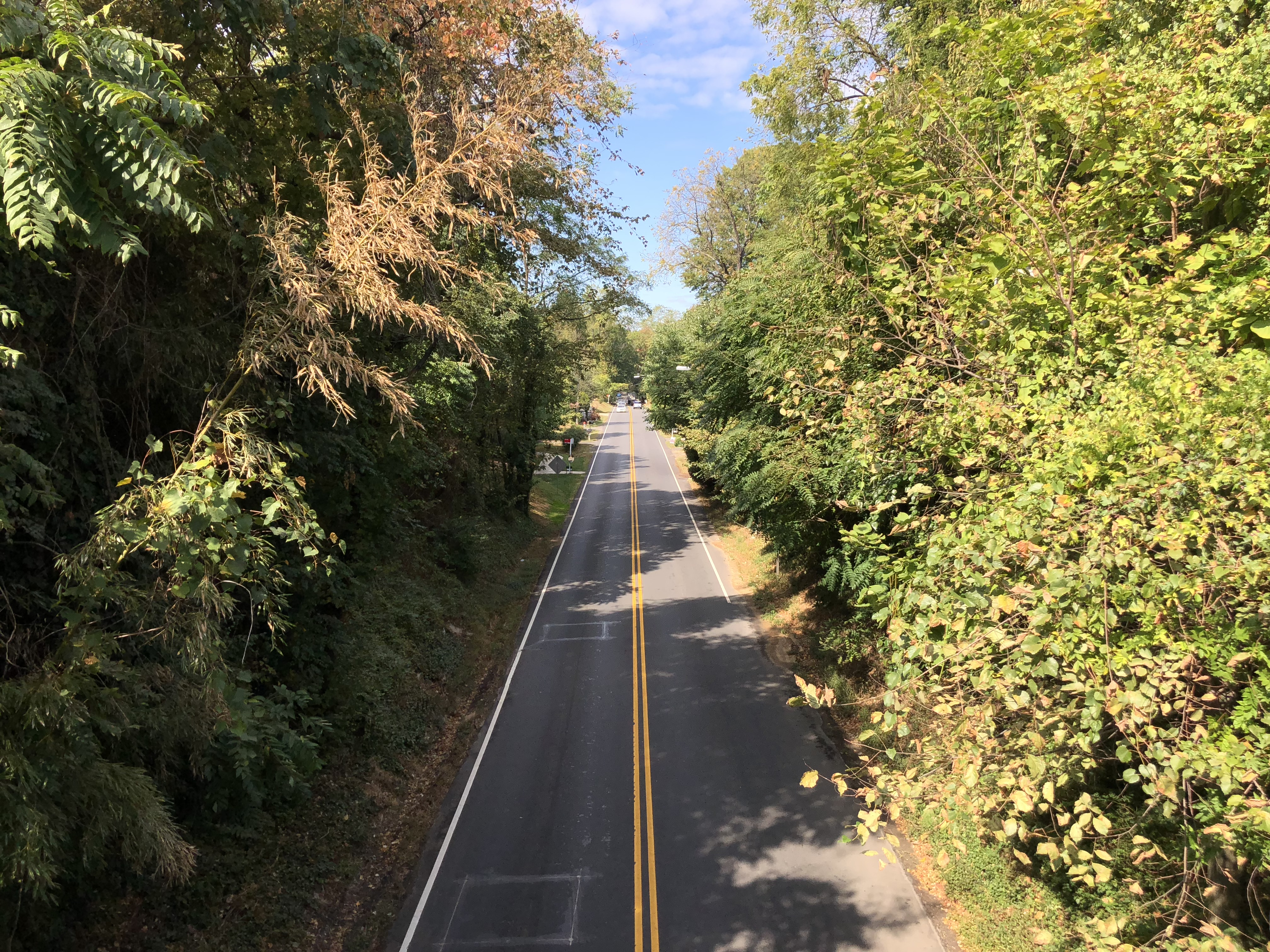
View north along SR 309 from Kirby Road in McLean

SR 309 begins at an intersection with SR 123 (Dolley Madison Boulevard) in McLean. Old Dominion Drive continues northwest as SR 738 toward Great Falls. The state highway heads east as a four-lane divided highway through the center of McLean. East of Chain Bridge Road, SR 309 becomes a two-lane undivided road and crosses Pimmit Run. The state highway passes through a densely populated residential area in northeastern Fairfax County and far western Arlington County. Shortly after entering the latter county, SR 309 expands to a four-lane divided street and intersects SR 120 (Glebe Road) at an oblique intersection adjacent to Marymount University; at the south end of the intersection, the two highways cross over Yorktown Boulevard. At 26th Street, which connects the highway with Yorktown Boulevard and the university, the state highway becomes a two-lane undivided road again. SR 309 briefly runs concurrently with US 29 as four-lane divided Old Dominion Drive. At the highways' western junction, at which there is no direct access from northbound US 29 to westbound SR 309, the U.S. Highway heads toward Falls Church as Lee Highway. The two highways diverge, with US 29 following Old Dominion Drive and SR 309 using the parallel two-lane undivided Lee Highway. Within Arlington's Cherrydale neighborhood, SR 309 reaches its eastern terminus at a five-way intersection with US 29, Quincy Street, and Military Road. Lee Highway continues east along US 29 toward Rosslyn.

== Major intersections ==
County	Location	mi	km	Destinations	Notes
Fairfax	McLean	0.00	0.00	SR 123 (Dolley Madison Boulevard) / SR 738 west (Old Dominion Drive)	Western terminus
Fairfax	Chesterbrook	2.1	3.4	SR 695 (Kirby Road)	interchange
Arlington		3.99	6.42	SR 120 (North Glebe Road)	no left turn from either direction of SR 309
Arlington	Waverly Hills	4.58	7.37	US 29 south (Langston Boulevard)	West end of concurrency with US 29; no direct access from northbound US 29 to westbound SR 309
Arlington	Waverly Hills	4.63	7.45	US 29 north (Old Dominion Drive)	east end of concurrency with US 29
Arlington	Cherrydale	5.33	8.58	US 29 (Old Dominion Drive / Langston Boulevard)	Eastern terminus
1.000 mi = 1.609 km; 1.000 km = 0.621 mi: Concurrency terminus
