= Glebe House (Arlington, Virginia) =

Historic house in Virginia, United States

- The Glebe
- U.S. National Register of Historic Places
- Virginia Landmarks Register
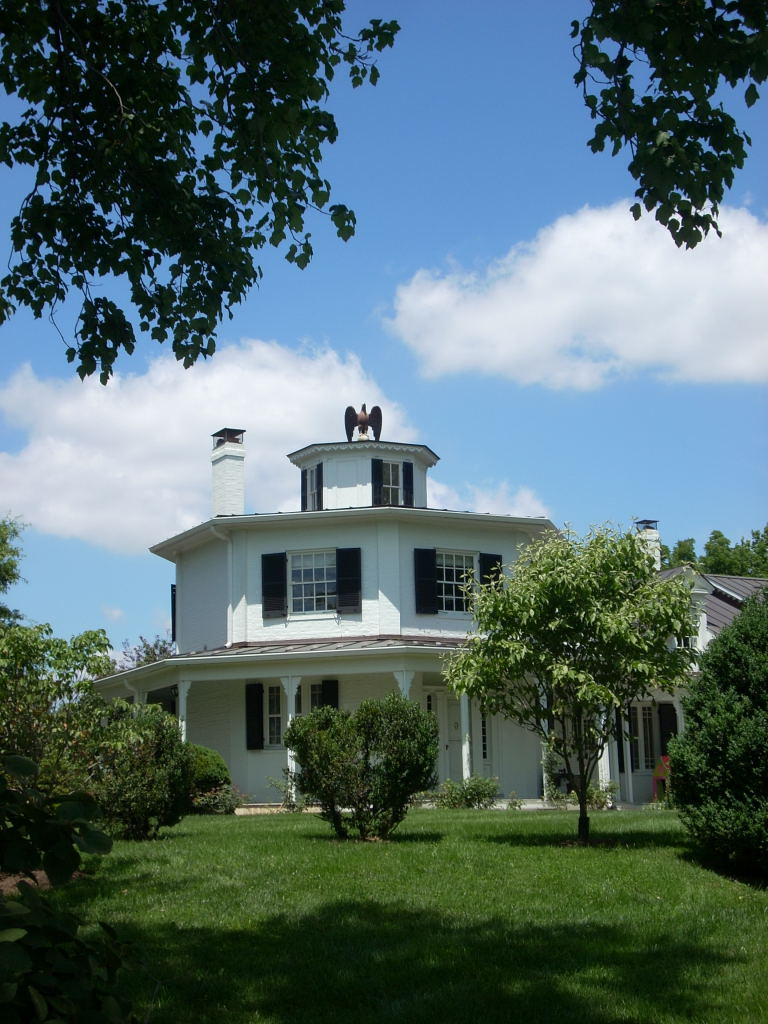
- The Glebe in 2009

- Location within District of Columbia Location within Virginia Location within the United States
- Location: 4527 17th St., N., Arlington, Virginia
- Coordinates: 38°53′30″N 77°7′4″W
- Area: 2 acres (0.81 ha)
- Built: 1857
- Architectural style: Octagon Mode
- NRHP reference No.: 72001381
- VLR No.: 000-0003

Significant dates
- Added to NRHP: February 23, 1972
- Designated VLR: July 6, 1971

The Glebe House, built in 1854–1857, is a historic house with an octagon-shaped wing in Arlington County, Virginia. The Northern Virginia Conservation Trust holds a conservation easement to help protect and preserve it. The name of the house comes from the property's history as a glebe, an area of land within an ecclesiastical parish used to support a parish priest. In this case, the Church of England established the glebe before the American Revolutionary War.

A historical marker that the Arlington County government erected near the house in 1969 states that the glebe was a 500-acre (200 ha) farm that was:

... provided for the rector of Fairfax Parish, which included both Christ Church, Alexandria, and the Falls Church. The Glebe House, built in 1775, stood here. It burned in 1808 and was rebuilt in 1820, as a hunting lodge; the octagon wing was added about 1850. Distinguished persons who have occupied the house include the Rev. Bryan Fairfax (8th Lord Fairfax), John Peter Van Ness (Mayor of Washington), Clark Mills (sculptor), Caleb Cushing (first U.S. Minister to China), and Frank Ball (state senator).

The house is listed on the Virginia Landmarks Register by the Virginia Department of Historic Resources, with number 000-0003. The National Park Service listed the house on the National Register of Historic Places on February 23, 1972. The Arlington County Board designated the building as a local historic district on January 7, 1984.

The house is located near Glebe Road (Virginia State Route 120), a major road through Arlington County, which also takes its name from the historic glebe lands of Fairfax Parish.

== See also ==
- Glebe
- Cushing House Museum and Garden, Newburyport, Massachusetts — a National Historic Landmark and another home of diplomat Caleb Cushing
- Caleb Cushing House and Farm, Rehoboth, Massachusetts
- List of Arlington County Historic Districts
