= Waverly Hills Historic District =

Historic house in Virginia, United States

- U.S. National Register of Historic Places
- U.S. Historic district
- Virginia Landmarks Register
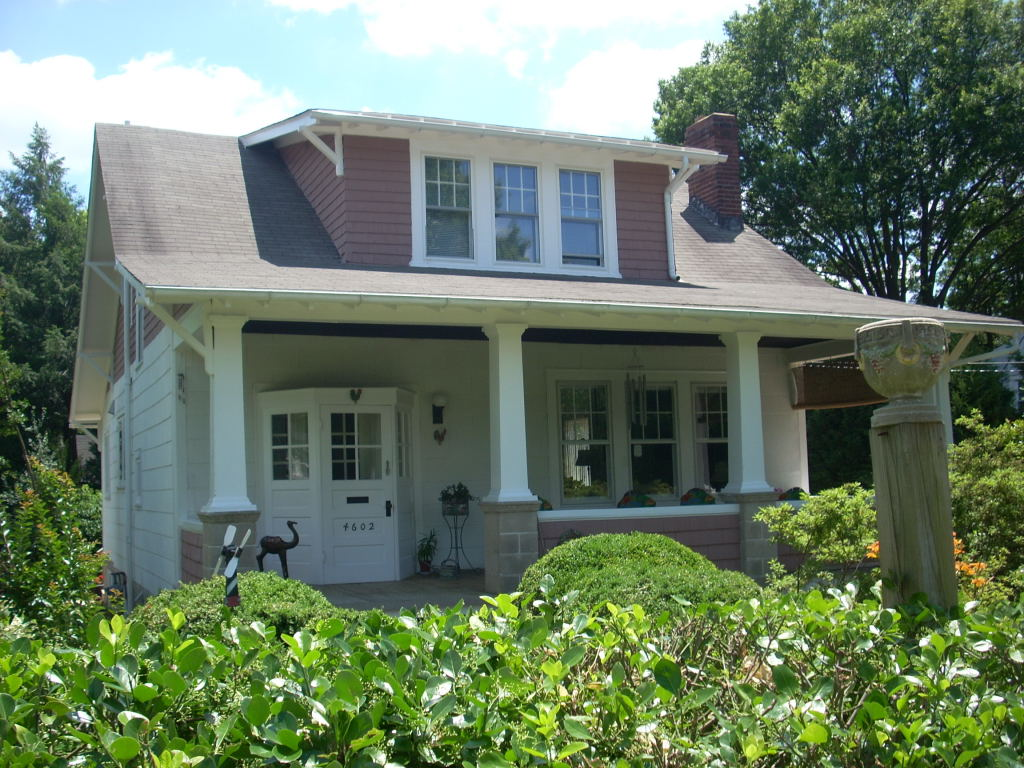
- Bungalow-style dwelling in the Waverly Hills Historic District, June 2009

- Location within District of Columbia Location within Virginia Location within the United States
- Location: Roughly bounded by 20th Rd. N, N. Utah St, I-66, N. Glebe Rd. and N. Vermont St., Arlington, Virginia
- Coordinates: 38°53′31″N 77°7′2″W
- Area: 89.1 acres (36.1 ha)
- Built: c. 1850, 1919-1939
- Architectural style: Late 19th And 20th Century Revivals, Late 19th And Early 20th Century American Movements
- NRHP reference No.: 04000111
- VLR No.: 000-9413

Significant dates
- Added to NRHP: February 26, 2004
- Designated VLR: December 3, 2003

The Waverly Hills Historic District is a national historic district located at Arlington County, Virginia. It contains 439 contributing buildings in a residential neighborhood in North Arlington. The area is the result of the combination of five separate subdivisions platted for development between 1919 and 1939. The dwelling styles include a variety of architectural styles, including Tudor Revival, Colonial Revival, Dutch Colonial Revival, Bungalow / Craftsman, and Cape Cods. Located within the district is the separately listed Glebe House (c. 1850).

It was listed on the National Register of Historic Places in 2004.
