= Claude Moore Colonial Farm =

Defunct living museum in Virginia, US

- Location within Virginia. Claude Moore Colonial Farm (Virginia) Claude Moore Colonial Farm (the United States)
- Established: 1973
- Dissolved: 21 December 2018
- Location: 6310 Georgetown Pike, McLean, Virginia, U.S.
- Coordinates: 38.953611°N 77.1525°W
- Type: Living museum

Claude Moore Colonial Farm, originally Turkey Run Farm, was a U.S. park in Virginia re-creating and re-enacting life on a tenant farm circa 1771. The park closed permanently on December 21, 2018. The National Park Service was subsequently said to be in the process of planning the future of the park and its facilities

The Friends of Claude Moore Colonial Farm at Turkey Run Inc., a privately funded foundation, paid for all activities on the Farm, while the land it occupied was owned by the National Park Service. It received only certain maintenance services from the Park Service. The Farm was located in McLean, Virginia, a suburb of Washington, D.C., next to the George Bush Center for Intelligence and the Turner-Fairbank Highway Research Center.

The mission of Claude Moore Colonial Farm was to recreate the life of tenant farmers circa 1771. The majority of Virginians of that time period were tenant farmers who grew tobacco to pay their rent while growing food to eat. By contrast, Colonial Williamsburg mainly demonstrates the life of merchants, landowners, and other members of colonial Virginia's upper crust.

== History ==
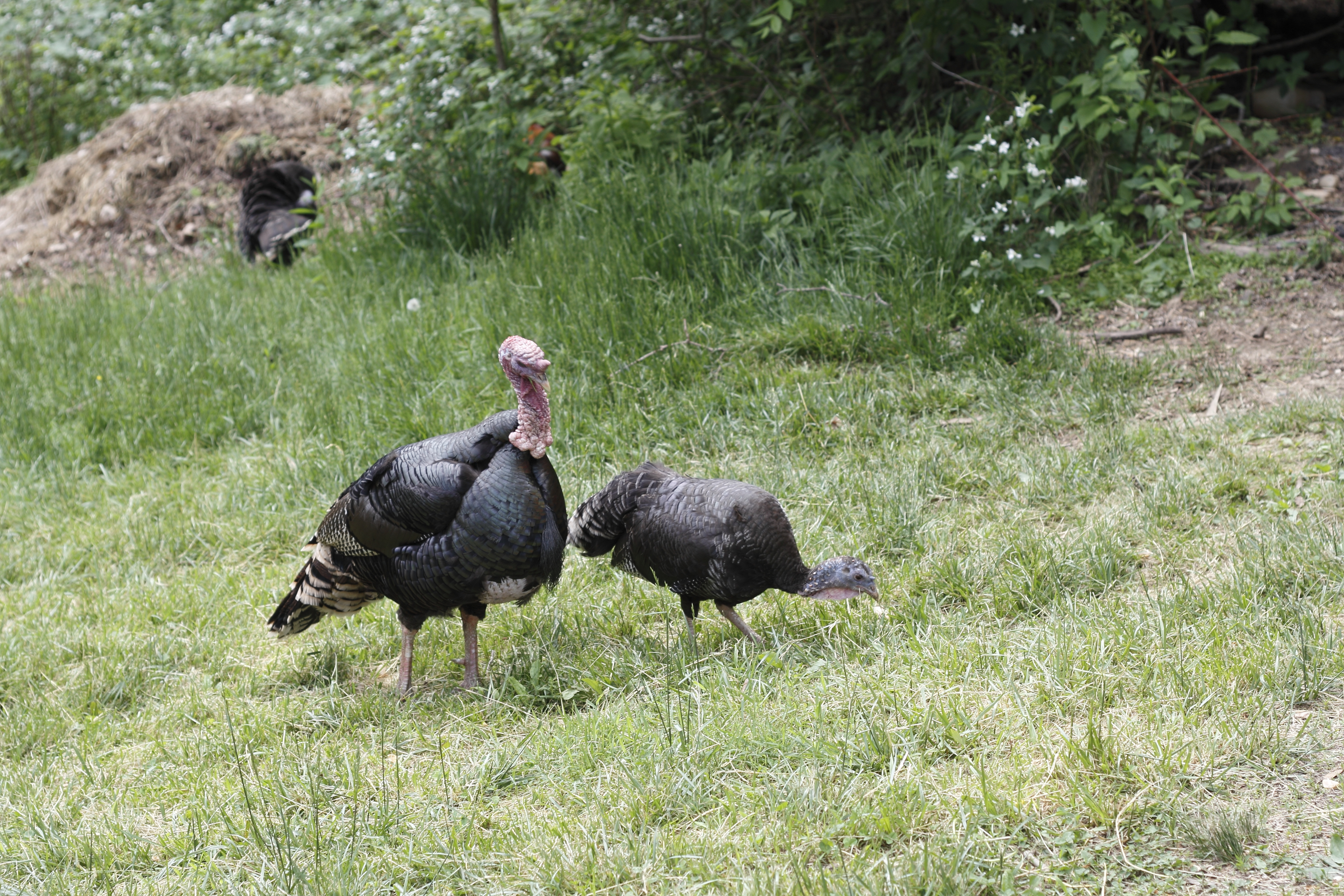
Male and female turkeys at the Farm

Originally named Turkey Run Farm when it opened in July 1973 as a National Park Service operation, the Claude Moore Colonial Farm was renamed in 1981 for local land developer Dr. Claude Moore, whose large bequest at the time of his death allowed it to establish itself as the only autonomous site in the National Park system. It took no NPS funding, and operated off of the dividends of its endowment, volunteer-run fundraising efforts, and donations from the public.

The Farm operation expanded its facilities over the years. The GateHouse Giftshop replaced the admission fee drop box honor system, and an event deck and the Bounty Garden were added at the front parking lot. After the terrorist attacks of September 11, 2001, a new access road was cut through the upper pasture so that access to the farm office no longer passed through the security gate of the Federal Highway Administration headquarters, near the CIA grounds. In 2011, "Chez Puce," formerly the site of the Farm's alternating book and "garage" sales, became a full-fledged used-book store, open Wednesday through Saturday.

== Park operations ==
The Farm was run by a small paid professional staff, supplemented by many volunteers both behind the scenes and in costume. The interpretive staff, including pre-teens and teenagers who portrayed the farm children, demonstrated mid-eighteenth-century farm life, including field work, crafts, cooking, and other activities. Staff (including volunteers) used first-person portrayals to demonstrate living history and help visitors feel as if they'd stepped back in time. The Farm's heirloom crops and heritage-breed livestock were carefully researched to provide as accurate a re-creation as possible.

The Farm cooperated with Fairfax County, Virginia, in providing work-release parolees with court-required employment, which, on a working farm, meant labor.

=== Recurring events ===
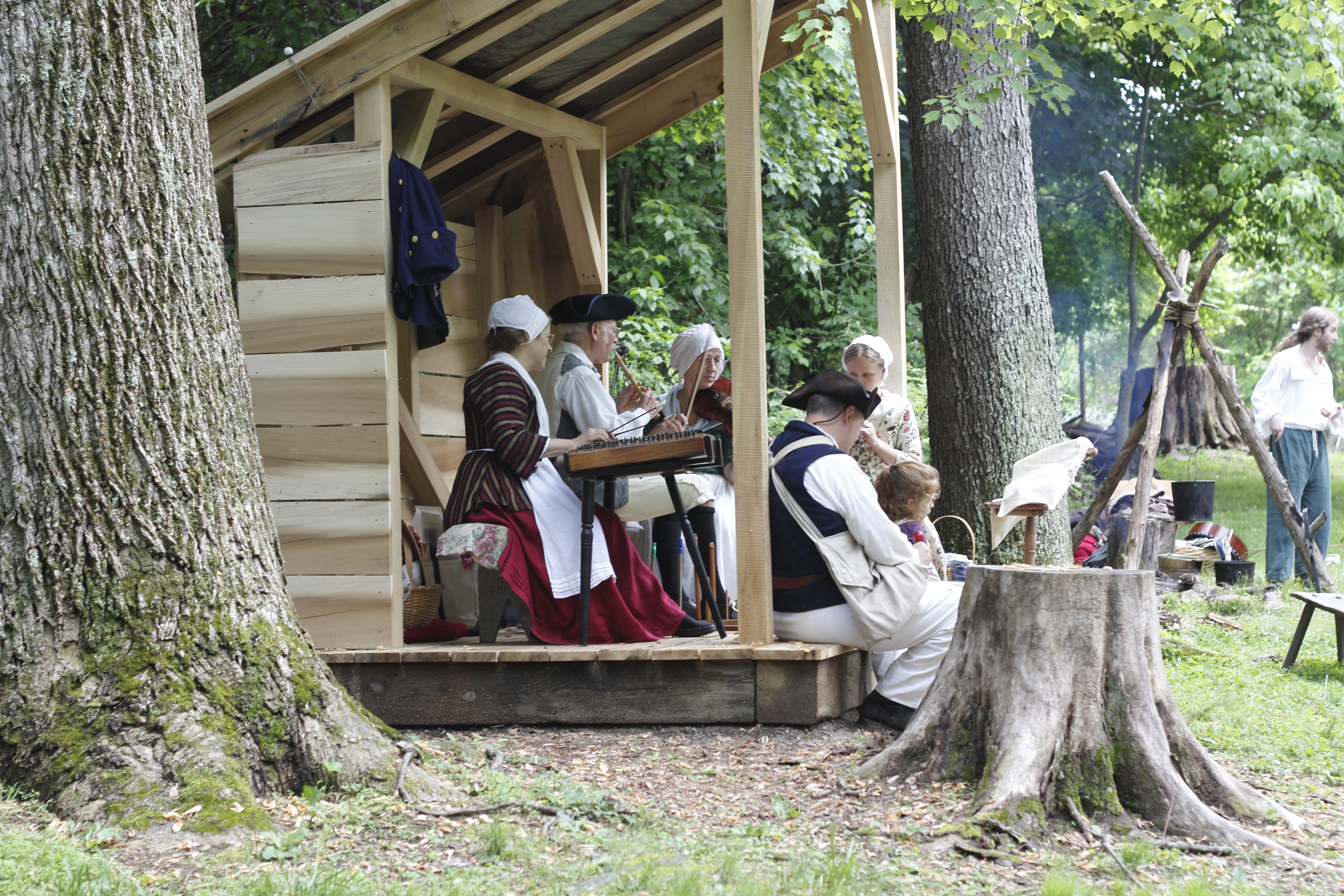
Musical entertainment at the Market Fair

The highlight of the Farm's year was the Market Fair, held the third full weekends of May, July, and October. The Fair was enhanced by the participation of a cadre of long-time volunteers, including a blacksmith, a cabinet maker, a milliner, an herb and flower seller, a potter, and a chair bodger; and it featured a toy store, a scriptorium, a puppet theatre, chicken roasting, a tavern, and more. Many of the Market Fair participants were members of American Revolutionary War and other re-enactor groups, and often appeared at other colonial-history events as well.

Other recurring events included the annual gathering and threshing of wheat and the annual preparation of the tobacco crop. A colonial Wassail, including the blessing of the orchard, was the final event of the season, in mid-December.

=== Closure ===
As of December 21, 2018, the Farm was no longer open to visitors.

== See also ==
- Open-air museum
