= Glebewood Village Historic District =

Historic district in Virginia, United States

- U.S. National Register of Historic Places
- U.S. Historic district
- Virginia Landmarks Register
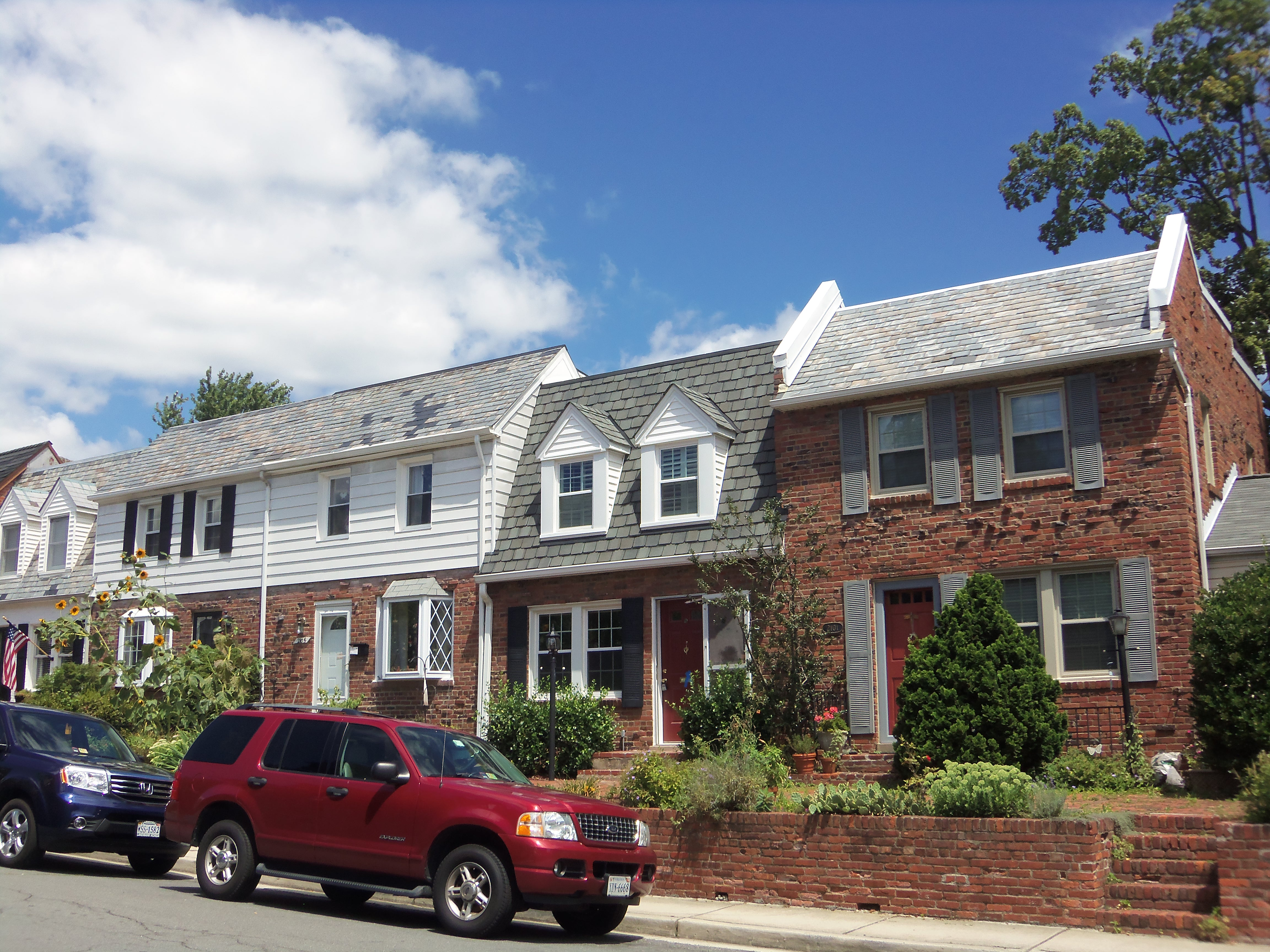

- Location within District of Columbia Location within Virginia Location within the United States
- Location: N. Brandywine St. between Lee Highway and 10th Place N., 21St Rd. between N. Brandywine St. and N. Glebe Rd., Arlington, Virginia
- Coordinates: 38°52′58″N 77°8′11″W
- Area: 5.9 acres (2.4 ha)
- Built: 1937-1938
- Architectural style: Colonial Revival
- NRHP reference No.: 04000049
- VLR No.: 000-9414

Significant dates
- Added to NRHP: February 11, 2004
- Designated VLR: December 3, 2003

The Glebewood Village Historic District is a national historic district located at Arlington County, Virginia. It contains 105 contributing buildings in a residential neighborhood in northern Arlington. It was built between 1937 and 1938, and consists of seven individual blocks of Colonial Revival-style rowhouses. Each block consists of between 2 and 39 single rowhouse dwellings. Each rowhouse is two stories in height, two bays wide, of brick construction and capped with an asymmetrical side-gabled roof.

It was listed on the National Register of Historic Places in 2004.
