= VA243 =

VA243 may refer to:

- Ariane flight VA243, an Ariane 5 launch that occurred on 25 September 2018
- Virgin Australia flight 243, with IATA flight number VA243
- Virginia State Route 243 (VA-243), a primary state highway in the United States
