= Virginia State Route 237 =

State highway in northern Virginia, US

State Route 237

Route information
- Maintained by VDOT
- Length: 13.07 mi (21.03 km)
- Existed: 1933–present

Major junctions
- West end: SR 236 in Fairfax
- US 29 / US 50 in Fairfax; SR 7 in Falls Church; US 29 in Arlington County
- East end: US 50 in Arlington

Location
- Country: United States
- State: Virginia
- Counties: Fairfax City, Fairfax, Falls Church, Arlington

Highway system
- Virginia Routes; Interstate; US; Primary; Secondary; Byways; History; HOT lanes
← SR 236	→ SR 238

State Route 237 (SR 237) is a primary state highway in the U.S. state of Virginia. The state highway runs 13.07 miles (21.03 km) from SR 236 in Fairfax east to U.S. Route 50 (US 50) in Arlington. SR 237 connects Fairfax and Arlington with Falls Church. Between Fairfax and Falls Church, the state highway mostly runs concurrently with US 29. East of Falls Church, SR 237 parallels Interstate 66 (I-66) and connects several of Arlington's urban villages.

== Route description ==
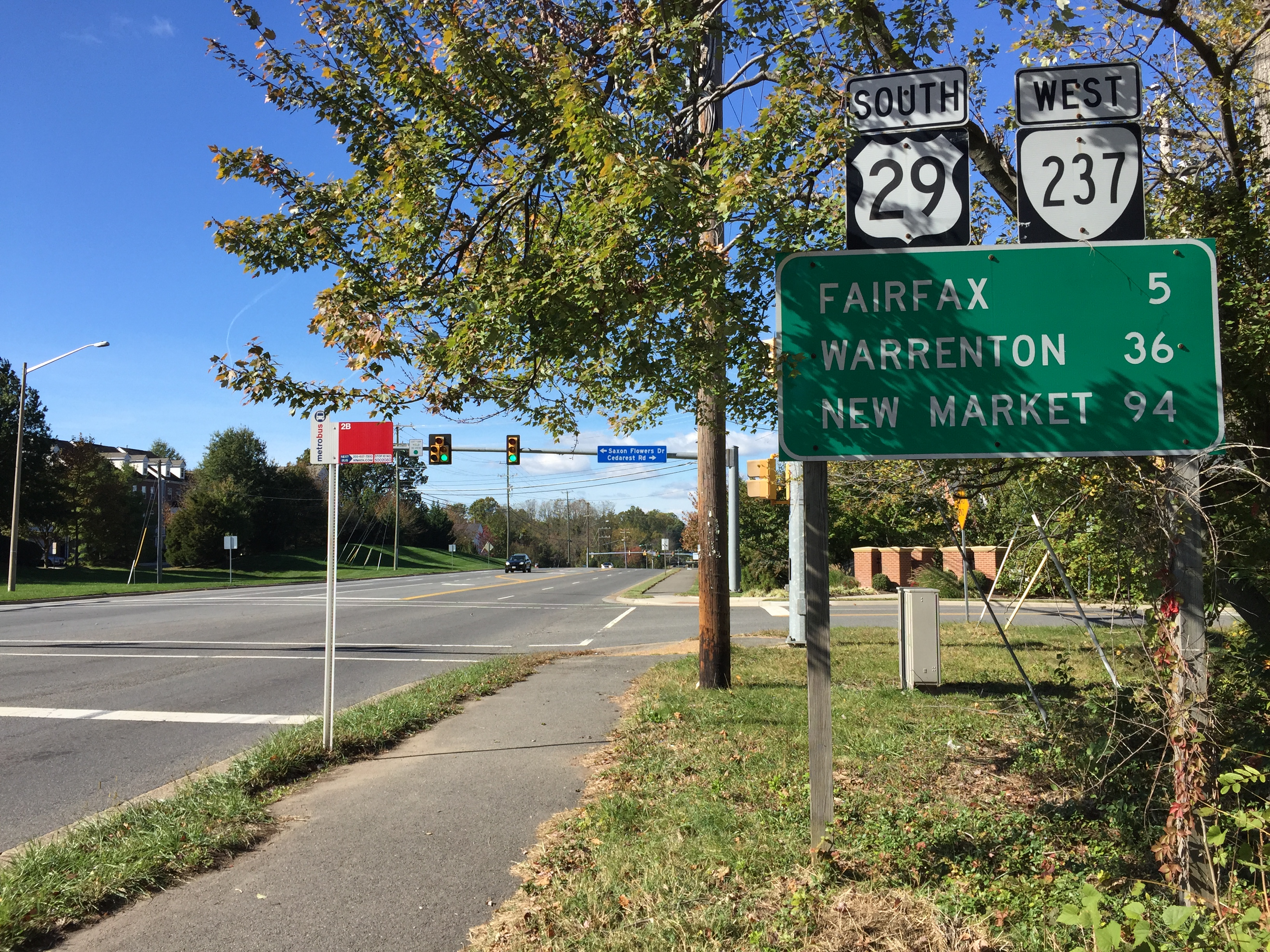
US 29 and SR 237 cosigned in Merrifield

SR 237 begins at an intersection with SR 236 (Main Street) at the eastern edge of Fairfax. The state highway heads north as Pickett Road, a four-lane divided highway that parallels the eastern boundary of the city between a pair of shopping centers, an oil depot, a country club, and a park within which the highway crosses Accotink Creek. Pickett Road ends at US 50 (Arlington Boulevard); the roadway continues north as Blake Lane while SR 237 turns west, though still signed as northbound at this point, onto six-lane US 50 for the short distance to Fairfax Circle, a four-leg cut-through traffic circle through which US 50 passes as the main road. US 50 continues west along with US 29 on Lee Highway, which is also a bypass of downtown Fairfax named Fairfax Boulevard. The south leg of the junction is Blenheim Boulevard, which heads toward downtown Fairfax. SR 237 and US 29 north follow Lee Highway on the north leg of the traffic circle. North of Fairfax Circle, the two highways exit the city of Fairfax and intersect SR 655 (Blake Lane).

SR 237 and US 29 head east along a five-lane road with a center left-turn lane that intersects Nutley Street, which heads north as SR 243 and provides access to the Vienna station on the Orange Line of the Washington Metro and I-66 on its way to Vienna. The two highways pass through the industrial community of Merrifield. There, the road becomes a divided highway and intersects SR 650 (Gallows Road), which leads north to the Washington Metro's Dunn Loring station. SR 237 and US 29 cross over I-495 (Capital Beltway) between the Interstate's interchanges with I-66 and US 50. The two highways become Washington Street, a narrow four-lane road with occasional medians, in the city of Falls Church. SR 237 and US 29 meet the western end of SR 338 (Hillwood Avenue) next to The Falls Church and intersect SR 7 (Broad Street) in the center of the city.

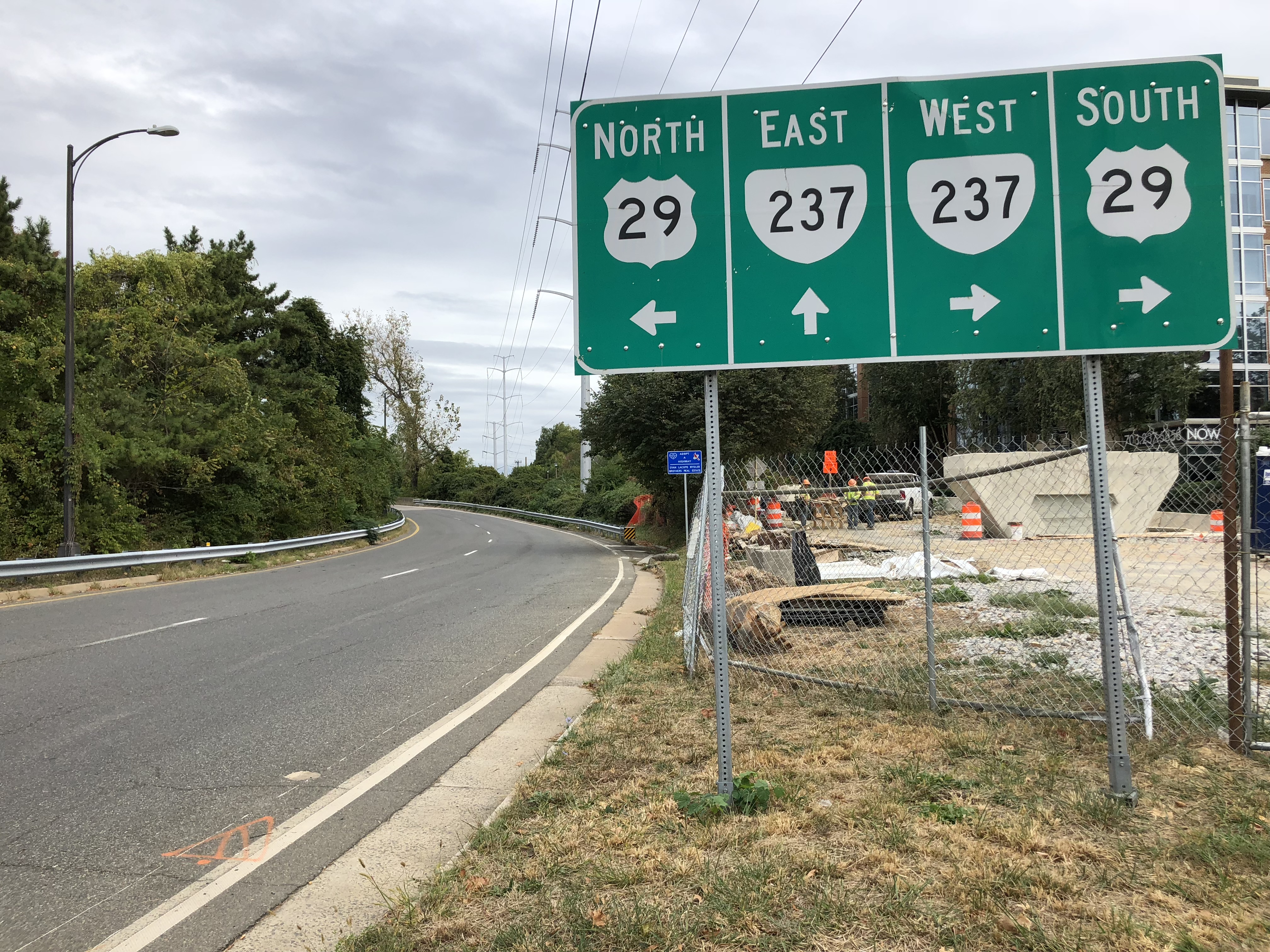
View eastbound along SR 237 where it diverges from northbound US 29 in Arlington County

SR 237 and US 29 become Lee Highway again on entering the East Falls Church area of Arlington County. Just north of the city boundary, the two highways intersect the Washington & Old Dominion Railroad Trail and diverge at their partial diamond interchange with I-66, which provides access to and from the direction of Front Royal and Washington Dulles International Airport. Westbound SR 237 crosses over I-66 and the Orange Line, which runs in I-66's median, with US 29; eastbound SR 237 crosses the Interstate and transit line on its own bridge. The two two-lane roadways come together on the north side of the Interstate as Washington Boulevard and the highway intersects Sycamore Street, which provides access to the East Falls Church station of the Washington Metro and to another partial diamond interchange that accesses I-66 to and from Washington.

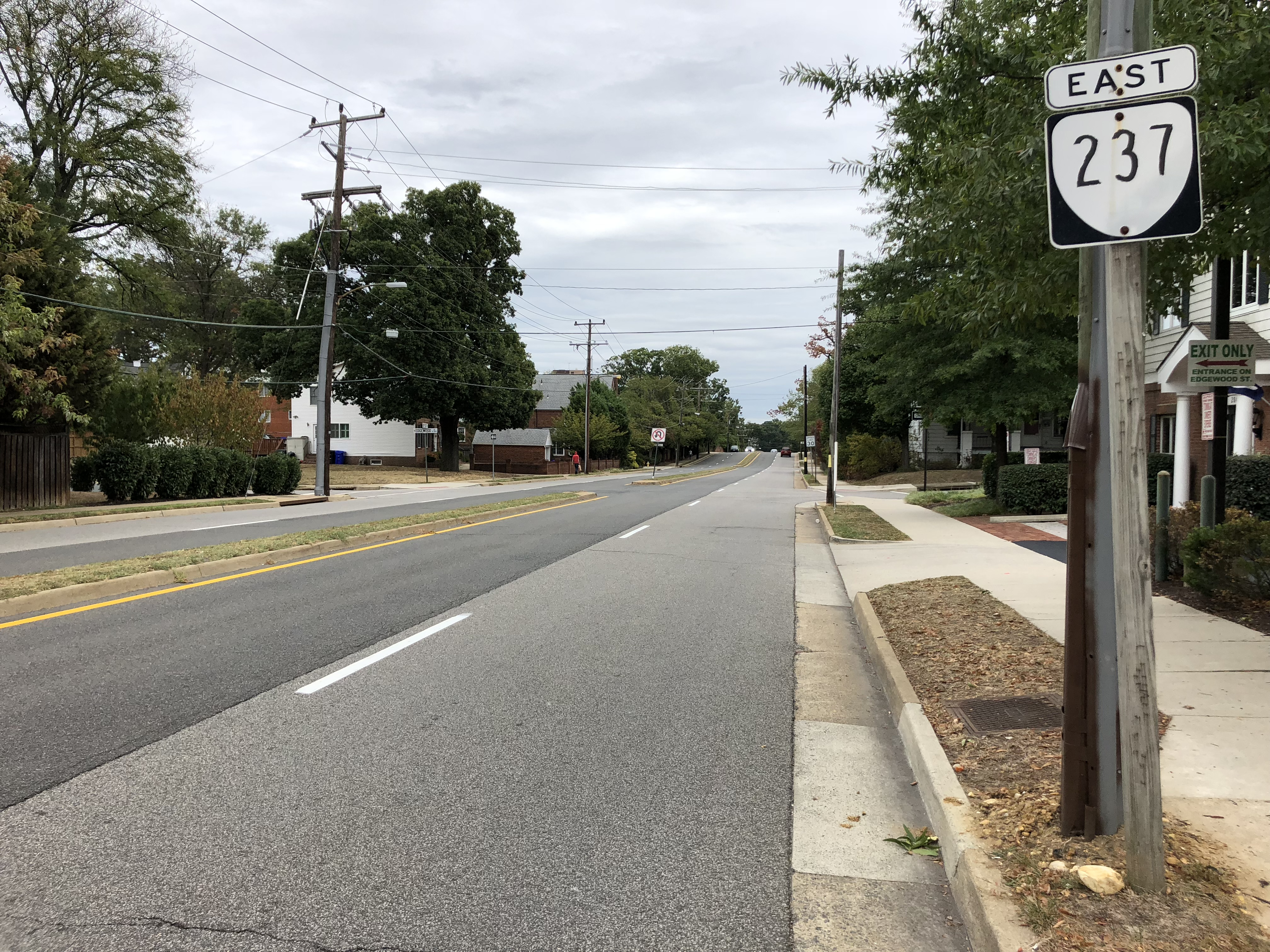
View east along SR 237 (10th Street) just east of Washington Boulevard in Arlington

SR 237 (Washington Boulevard) heads east from Sycamore Street as a two-lane undivided road that passes through several densely populated neighborhoods in the Westover area of Arlington County. The state highway becomes four lanes just before crossing over I-66 into Ballston. SR 237 intersects SR 120 (Glebe Road); the state highway turns south on Glebe Road to run concurrently with six-lane SR 120, which has a partial diamond interchange with I-66 immediately to the north, while Washington Boulevard continues east as an unnumbered street. Two blocks to the south, SR 237 turns east onto Fairfax Drive, which continues west as an unnumbered street onto ramps to and from I-66 heading west. The four-lane divided highway passes through the center of Ballston and the adjoining Virginia Square and by the Washington Metro's Ballston–MU station and Virginia Square–GMU station, respectively. Within Virginia Square, the highway passes the urban campus of the George Mason University School of Law.

At a four-way intersection with Kirkwood Road in Clarendon, SR 237 veers east onto 10th Street. The four-lane divided street passes along Clarendon's southern edge. After intersecting Washington Boulevard, SR 237 passes through a residential neighborhood. At the east end of that neighborhood, the highway reaches its eastern terminus at US 50 (Arlington Boulevard) just west of Fort Myer at the southern edge of the Courthouse neighborhood.

== Major intersections ==
County	Location	mi	km	Destinations	Notes
City of Fairfax		0.00	0.00	SR 236 (Main Street) to I-495	Western terminus
City of Fairfax		1.66	2.67	US 50 east (Arlington Boulevard) / SR 655 (Blake Lane) to US 29 north (Lee Highway)	Western terminus of US 50 wrong-way concurrency
City of Fairfax		1.94	3.12	US 29 south / US 50 west (Fairfax Boulevard) / Blenheim Boulevard	Fairfax Circle; eastern terminus of US 50 wrong-way concurrency; western terminus of US 29 concurrency
Fairfax		2.15	3.46	SR 655 (Blake Lane) to US 50 east / SR 236	
Fairfax	Merrifield	2.80	4.51	SR 243 north (Nutley Street) to I-66 – Vienna/Fairfax–GMU station	Southern terminus of SR 243
Fairfax	Merrifield	4.80	7.72	SR 650 (Gallows Road) to I-495 – Dunn Loring–Merrifield station	
Fairfax		5.10	8.21	I-495 Express south	EZ-Pass interchange
City of Falls Church		7.52	12.10	SR 338 (Hillwood Avenue)	
City of Falls Church		7.80	12.55	SR 7 (Broad Street)	
Arlington	East Falls Church	8.54	13.74	US 29 north (Lee Highway) / Washington Boulevard to I-66 west	Eastern terminus of US 29 concurrency
Arlington	East Falls Church	8.83	14.21	Sycamore Street to I-66 east – East Falls Church station	
Arlington	Ballston	11.08	17.83	SR 120 north (Glebe Road) / Washington Boulevard to I-66 east	Western terminus of SR 120 concurrency
Arlington	Ballston	11.33	18.23	SR 120 south (Glebe Road) / Fairfax Drive to I-66 west	Eastern terminus of SR 120 concurrency
Arlington	Court House	13.07	21.03	US 50 (Arlington Boulevard) – Washington, Falls Church, Fairfax	Interchange; eastern terminus
1.000 mi = 1.609 km; 1.000 km = 0.621 mi: Concurrency terminus; Electronic toll collection

< SR 711	District 7 State Routes; 1928–1933	SR 713 >
