= Gilberts Corner, Virginia =

Unincorporated community in Virginia, United States

- Unincorporated area
- Location within Northern Virginia Location within Virginia Location within the United States
- Coordinates: 38°58′8″N 77°37′21″W
- Country: United States
- State: Virginia
- County: Loudoun
- Time zone: UTC−5 (Eastern (EST))
  - Summer (DST): UTC−4 (EDT)

Gilberts Corner is an unincorporated area at the intersection of U.S. Routes 15 and 50 in Loudoun County, Virginia, United States, located east of the historic village of Aldie.

There are no residences at this intersection, but its name is attributed to the surrounding area. Gilberts Corner is named after the William Gilbert family, who ran the gas station/restaurant that sits at the northeastern quadrant of the crossroads. It gained prominence in the 1920s when the Carolina Road (now Watson Road) was a toll road and U.S. 15 was extended south from Leesburg to U.S. 50. Due to increased traffic from toll evaders, U.S. Route 15 eventually was extended even farther south. The gas station/restaurant closed in the 1980s and is currently in the process of being renovated. Due to heavy traffic in the area, many commuters avoided the intersection altogether by going through Lenah and taking U.S. Route 15 south.

== Traffic improvements ==
On May 1, 2008, Senator John Warner, Congressman Frank Wolf, and County Supervisor Jim Burton attended a groundbreaking ceremony to launch an improvement of the intersection. As part of a traffic calming initiative suggested by the Piedmont Environmental Council (PEC) and the Route 50 Traffic Planning Task Force, the suggestion was made to replace the signalized intersection with several roundabouts. In May, a connector road to the east of Gilbert's Corner on Route 50 was constructed to intersect Route 15 south of the existing intersection. Roundabouts were to be used rather than traffic lights.

In fall 2008, the main intersection itself was turned into a roundabout, and traffic lights removed. After this, traffic calming was to occur in Aldie, with the road being narrowed in order to slow down traffic. All work was supposed to be complete by fall 2009.

The PEC reports its involvement in the planning, construction, and improvement to the roundabout, in particular, its taking ownership of a 141-acre farm property and selling a nearby 68-acre property to the Northern Virginia Regional Park Authority (NVRPA). On the weekends, Gilbert's Corner serves as an outdoor market place with a farmer's market and several food vendors that has become very popular among locals and tourists visiting Virginia's wine and horse country.

In September 2013, the Virginia Department of Transportation (VDOT) announced changes to be made in the roundabout to address a high number of crashes caused by speeding. By November 2013, VDOT adjusted curb lines, markings and signs, and created a single lane on all approaches from both Route 15 and Route 50.

The U.S. Federal Highway Administration cited the Gilberts Corner Roundabout in its Livability in Transportation Guidebook: Planning Approaches that Promote Livability:

"Outcomes and Results

"The traffic calming plan was adopted by the Middleburg Town Council and the Loudoun and Fauquier County Board of Supervisors in 1997, and was recognized by the ITE President’s Award for Excellence. The following year, Virginia Senator John Warner secured $13 million in congressional funding for the traffic calming demonstration project under the Federal TEA-21 transportation bill. In 2000, a second round of planning and design began with VDOT and the Route 50 Corridor Coalition working together in the Route 50 Traffic Calming Task Force. The Task Force is responsible for overseeing the plan’s implementation as it goes through project development, final design, and construction. A design memorandum was produced in 2003, followed by full construction design documents. Project construction began in 2007, with various elements of the project completed and some underway.

"Lessons Learned

"Roundabouts were used to address traffic congestion and safety at key intersections such as Route 50 and Route 15 at Gilberts Corner. The use of roundabouts prevented excess widening typically required for turn lanes at conventional intersections and improved traffic flow and safety while reducing speeds. Instead of focusing traffic movements on a single intersection, the Gilberts Corner design added three roundabouts: one at the primary intersection point of Routes 15 and 50, and two others connecting a new roadway between these roads that accommodated movements between the south and east directions... This was the first time that VDOT applied traffic calming to a primary State highway..."
