= Virginia State Route 243 =

State highway in Fairfax County, Virginia, United States

State Route 243
- Nutley Street

Route information
- Maintained by VDOT
- Length: 1.70 mi (2.74 km)
- Existed: 1960–present

Major junctions
- South end: US 29 / SR 237 on the Oakton–Merrifield line
- I-66 on the Oakton–Merrifield line
- North end: SR 123 in Vienna

Location
- Country: United States
- State: Virginia
- Counties: Fairfax

Highway system
- Virginia Routes; Interstate; US; Primary; Secondary; Byways; History; HOT lanes
← SR 242	→ SR 244

State Route 243 (SR 243), known as Nutley Street throughout its entire route, is a primary state highway in the U.S. state of Virginia. The state highway runs 2 miles (3.2 km) from U.S. Route 29 (US 29) and State Route 237 (SR 237) on the border between Oakton and Merrifield north to State Route 672 (Malcom Rd.) in Vienna. SR 243 connects Vienna and Fairfax with Interstate 66 (I-66) and the Vienna station of the Washington Metro.

== Route description ==
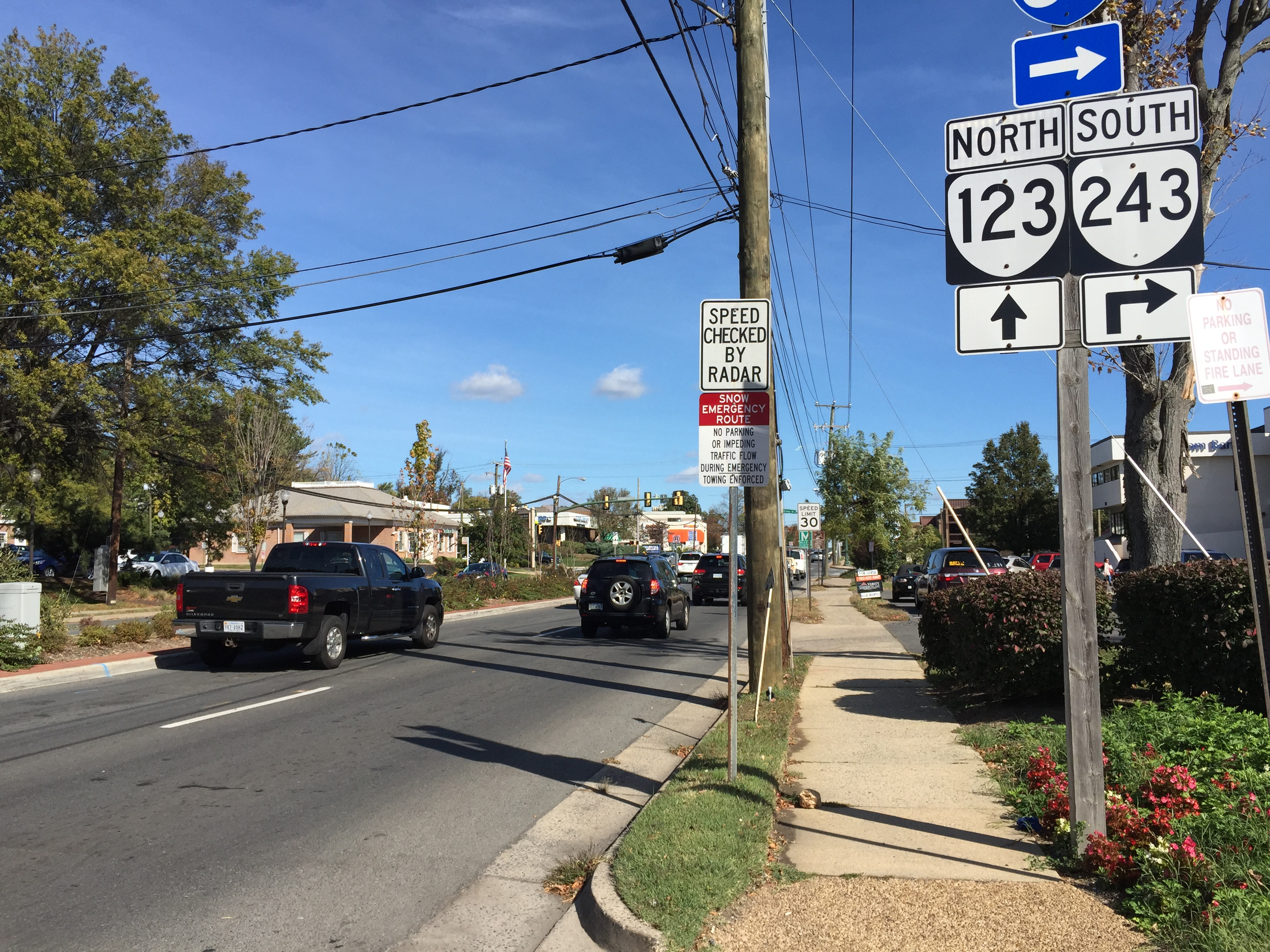
Sign for SR 243 along SR 123 in Vienna

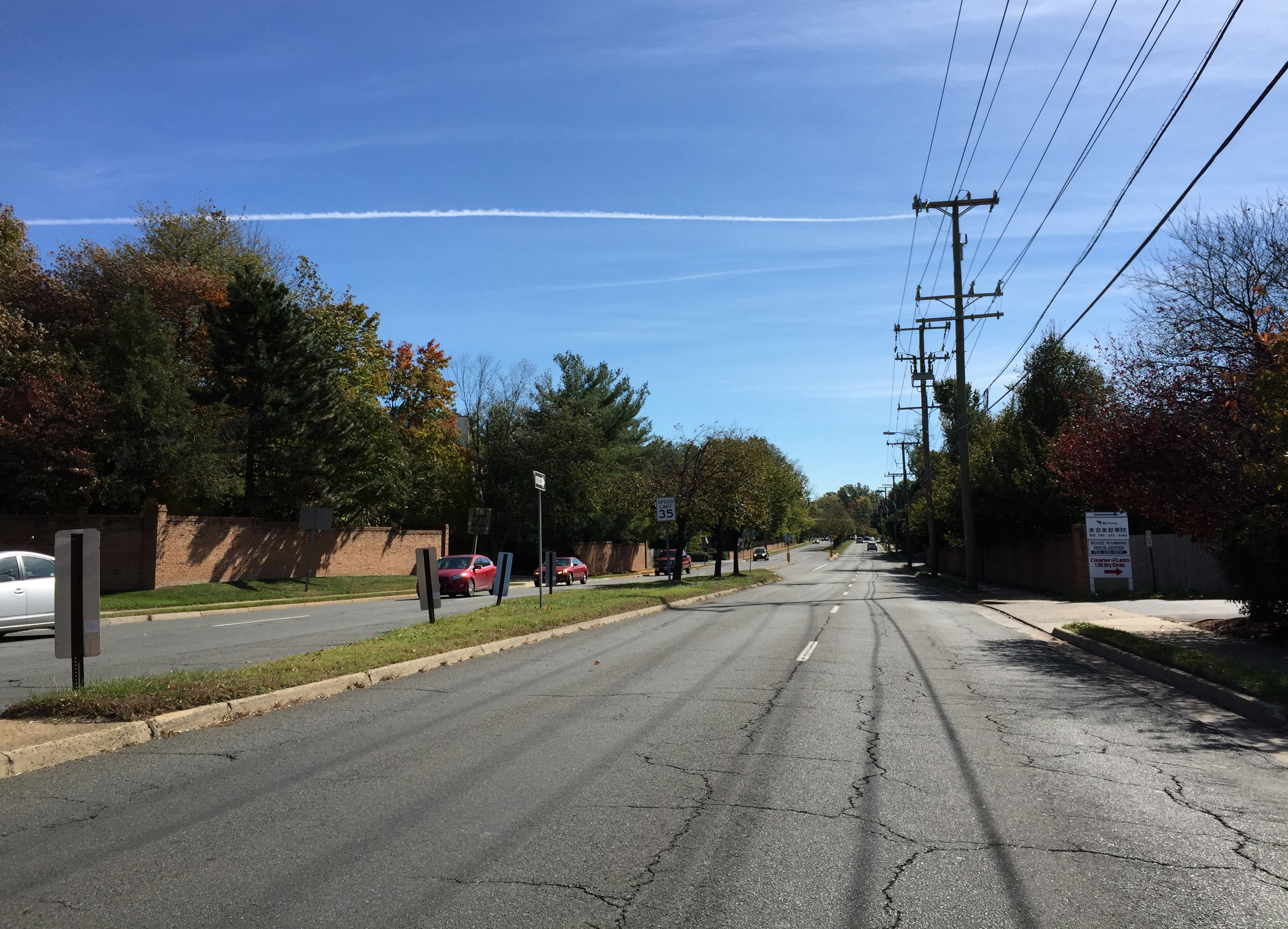
View south along SR 243 in Vienna

SR 243 begins at an intersection with US 29 and SR 237 (Lee Highway) between the independent city of Fairfax and the community of Merrifield. Nutley Street continues south 0.51 miles (0.82 km) as a two-lane undivided road designated SR 10272 to US 50 (Arlington Boulevard). SR 243 heads north as a six-lane divided highway through a cloverleaf interchange with I-66 just east of the Vienna station of the Washington Metro, which is the western terminus of the Orange Line that runs in the median of the Interstate from Vienna east to Arlington. Access to the station is provided by the first intersection on either side of the I-66 interchange. SR 243 continues into the town of Vienna as a four-lane divided boulevard that passes between residential neighborhoods before reaching its terminus at SR 123 (Maple Avenue) southwest of downtown Vienna. Nutley Street continues north as an unnumbered residential street for four blocks to Malcolm Road.

== Major intersections ==
The entire route is in Fairfax County.

Location	mi	km	Destinations	Notes
Oakton–Merrifield line	0.00	0.00	US 29 / SR 237 (Lee Highway) / Nutley Street south	Southern terminus; Nutley Street continues south without designation
Oakton–Merrifield line			Saintsbury Drive – Metro Station	
Oakton–Merrifield line	0.40	0.64	I-66 – Front Royal, Washington	Exit 62 on I-66
Vienna	1.70	2.74	SR 123 (Maple Avenue West) / Nutley Street north	Northern terminus; Nutley Street continues north without designation
1.000 mi = 1.609 km; 1.000 km = 0.621 mi
