= Virginia State Route 338 =

State highway in Virginia, United States

State Route 338
- Hillwood Avenue

Route information
- Maintained by VDOT
- Length: 1.08 mi (1.74 km)
- Existed: late 1930s–present

Major junctions
- West end: US 29 / SR 237 in Falls Church
- East end: US 50 / SR 7 / SR 613 at Seven Corners

Location
- Country: United States
- State: Virginia
- Counties: City of Falls Church, Fairfax

Highway system
- Virginia Routes; Interstate; US; Primary; Secondary; Byways; History; HOT lanes
← SR 337	→ SR 339

State Route 338 (SR 338) is a primary state highway in the U.S. state of Virginia. Known as Hillwood Avenue, the state highway runs 1.08 miles (1.74 km) from U.S. Route 29 (US 29) and SR 237 in Falls Church east to US 50, SR 7, and SR 613 at Seven Corners.

== Route description ==
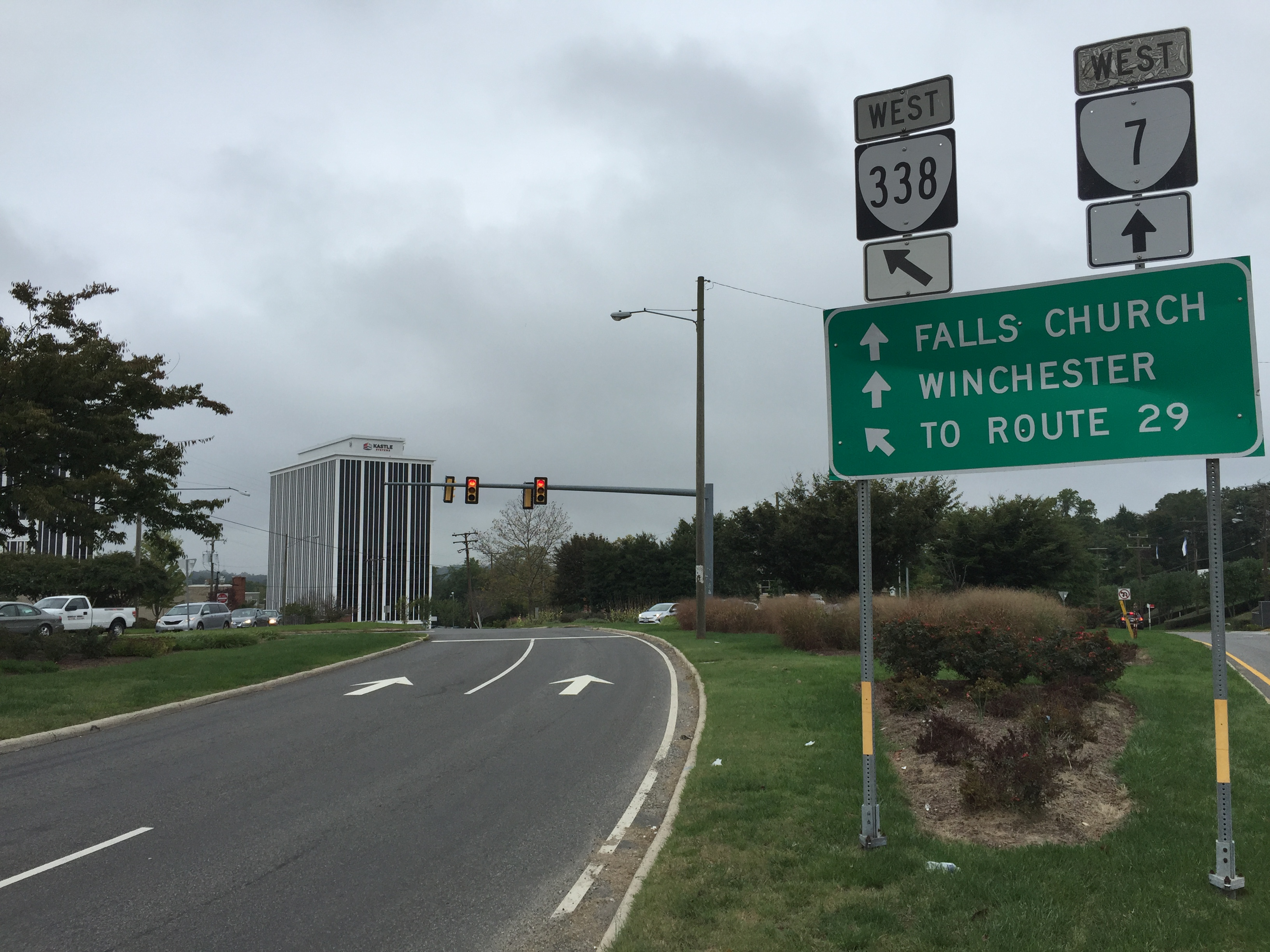
View west at the east end of SR 338 at US 50/SR 7/SR 613 in Seven Corners

SR 338 begins at an intersection with US 29 and SR 237 (Washington Street) in the independent city of Falls Church. There is no access from southbound US 29 to eastbound SR 338; that movement is made via Annandale Road at the intersection immediately to the east of the terminus. SR 338 heads east as a two-lane undivided street through a residential area. Shortly after leaving Falls Church and entering Fairfax County, the state highway reaches its eastern terminus at a seven-way junction with US 50 (Arlington Boulevard), SR 7 (Leesburg Pike), and SR 613, which heads north as Wilson Boulevard and south as Sleepy Hollow Road. SR 338 merges into SR 7 in the direction of Alexandria. Traffic from SR 338 follows eastbound SR 7, which provides access to both directions of SR 613 and to US 50, which passes under and interacts with the mass of intersections through a diamond interchange. The mass of intersections allows access to westbound SR 7 back toward Falls Church.

== Major intersections ==
County	Location	mi	km	Destinations	Notes
City of Falls Church		0.00	0.00	US 29 / SR 237 (South Washington Street)	Western terminus; no direct access from southbound US 29 to eastbound SR 338
Fairfax	Seven Corners	1.08	1.74	US 50 (Arlington Boulevard) / SR 7 east (Leesburg Pike) / SR 613 (Wilson Boulevard / Sleepy Hollow Road) – Alexandria, Washington, Clarendon, Fairfax	Eastern terminus; diamond interchange with US 50; intersections with other roads
1.000 mi = 1.609 km; 1.000 km = 0.621 mi: Incomplete access
