= Fair Oaks, Fairfax County, Virginia =

- Census-designated place
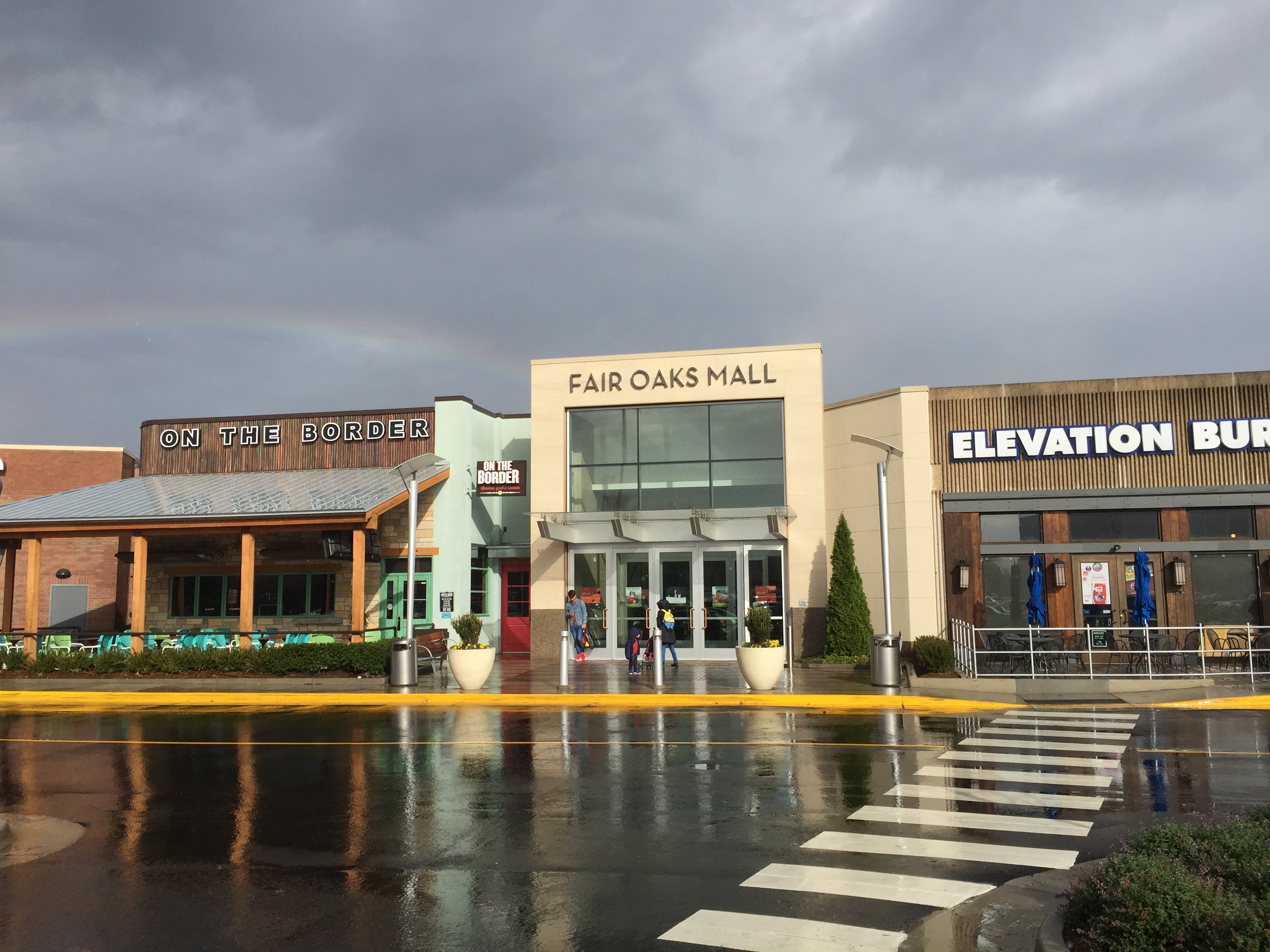
- Fair Oaks Mall

- Location within Northern Virginia Location within Virginia Location within the United States
- Coordinates: 38°51′57″N 77°21′33″W
- Country: United States
- State: Virginia
- County: Fairfax

Area
  - Total: 5.1 sq mi (13.1 km^{2})
  - Land: 5.0 sq mi (13.0 km^{2})
  - Water: 0.039 sq mi (0.1 km^{2})
- Elevation: 420 ft (130 m)

Population (2020)
  - Total: 34,052
  - Density: 6,784/sq mi (2,619.4/km^{2})
- Time zone: UTC−5 (Eastern (EST))
  - Summer (DST): UTC−4 (EDT)
- ZIP codes: 22033, 22030
- FIPS code: 51-26875
- GNIS feature ID: 2584845

Fair Oaks is a census-designated place in Fairfax County, Virginia, United States. The population at the 2020 census was 34,052. It encompasses a large area west of the city of Fairfax, centered on Fair Oaks Mall. Suburban neighborhoods and office parks occupy most of Fair Oaks, largely developed since the 1980s.

The Fair Oaks CDP is bordered by Fair Lakes and Greenbriar to the west, and by Oakton and Fairfax city to the east. The Fair Oaks Mall is at the center of the CDP, in the angle formed by U.S. Route 50 to the northeast and Interstate 66 to the south, which intersect at I-66's Exit 57. I-66 leads east 19 miles (31 km) to Washington, D.C., and west 61 miles (98 km) to Strasburg. U.S. 50 leads east into Fairfax and Washington and northwest 53 miles (85 km) to Winchester. U.S. Route 29 forms the southern border of the CDP, leading east into Fairfax and Washington and west 17 miles (27 km) to Gainesville.

== Geography ==
According to the U.S. Census Bureau, the Fair Oaks CDP has a total area of 5.1 square miles (13.1 km^{2}), of which 5.0 square miles (13.0 km^{2}) is land and 0.04 square miles (0.1 km^{2}), or 0.99%, is water.

== Demographics ==
Historical population
| Census | Pop. | Note | %± |
|---|---|---|---|
| 2010 | 30,223 | | — |
| 2020 | 34,052 | | 12.7% |
U.S. Decennial Census; 2010 2020

Fair Oaks was first listed as a census designated place in the 2010 U.S. census formed from part of Chantilly CDP and additional area.

Fair Oaks CDP, Virginia – Racial and ethnic composition Note: the US Census treats Hispanic/Latino as an ethnic category. This table excludes Latinos from the racial categories and assigns them to a separate category. Hispanics/Latinos may be of any race.
| Race / Ethnicity (NH = Non-Hispanic) | Pop 2010 | Pop 2020 | % 2010 | % 2020 |
|---|---|---|---|---|
| White alone (NH) | 15,799 | 14,905 | 52.27% | 43.77% |
| Black or African American alone (NH) | 2,583 | 3,547 | 8.55% | 10.42% |
| Native American or Alaska Native alone (NH) | 34 | 29 | 0.11% | 0.09% |
| Asian alone (NH) | 7,784 | 9,900 | 25.76% | 29.07% |
| Native Hawaiian or Pacific Islander alone (NH) | 41 | 23 | 0.14% | 0.07% |
| Other race alone (NH) | 134 | 166 | 0.44% | 0.49% |
| Mixed race or Multiracial (NH) | 1,049 | 1,942 | 3.47% | 5.70% |
| Hispanic or Latino (any race) | 2,799 | 3,540 | 9.26% | 10.40% |
| Total | 30,223 | 34,052 | 100.00% | 100.00% |

At the 2020 census (some information from the 2022 American Community Survey) there were 34,052 people, 15,561 housing units and 15,257 households residing in the CDP. The population density was 6,810.4 inhabitants per square mile (2,619.4/km^{2}). The average housing unit density was 3,112.2 per square mile (1,197.0/km^{2}). The racial makeup of the CDP was 45.63% White, 10.70% African American, 0.21% Native American, 29.19% Asian, 0.08% Pacific Islander, 3.48% from other races, and 10.72% from two or more races. Hispanic or Latino of any race was 10.40% of the population.

Of the households, 42.8% were married couple families, 19.5% were a male family householder with no spouse, and 29.9% were a female family householder with no spouse. The average family household had 3.11 people.

The median age was 34.3, 19.3% of people were under the age of 18, and 8.4% were 65 years of age or older. The largest ancestry is the 8.8% who had Irish ancestry, 41.7% spoke a language other than English at home, and 34.8% were born outside the United States, 61.3% of whom were naturalized citizens.

The median income for a household in the CDP was $118,819, and the median income for a family was $148,737. 4.8% of the population were military veterans, and 71.2% had a bachelor's degree or higher. In the CDP 6.4% of the population was below the poverty line, including 3.1% of those under the age of 18 and 5.3% of those aged 65 or over, with 5.1% of the population without health insurance.

=== 2010 census ===
The population at the 2010 census was 30,223.
