= Lenah, Virginia =

Unincorporated community in Virginia, United States

- Unincorporated community
- Location within Northern Virginia Location within Virginia Location within the United States
- Coordinates: 38°57′10″N 77°34′49″W
- Country: United States
- State: Virginia
- County: Loudoun
- Time zone: UTC−5 (Eastern (EST))
  - Summer (DST): UTC−4 (EDT)
- ZIP code: 20105 (Aldie)

Lenah is an unincorporated community located in the Aldie ZIP code area on U.S. Route 50 in Loudoun County, Virginia, United States. It lies at the crossroads of U.S. Route 50 and Lenah Road.
