= Interstate 66 =

Interstate in Virginia and Washington D.C.

Interstate 66
- I-66 highlighted in red

Route information
- Length: 76.28 mi (122.76 km)
- Existed: August 14, 1957–present
- NHS: Entire route
- Restrictions: No trucks on Custis Memorial Parkway or Theodore Roosevelt Bridge

Major junctions
- West end: I-81 near Middletown, VA
- US 340 / US 522 in Front Royal, VA; US 17 / SR 55 in Delaplane, VA; US 15 in Haymarket, VA; US 29 in Centreville, VA; SR 28 near Centreville, VA; SR 286 near Fair Oaks, VA; US 50 in Fair Oaks, VA; I-495 in Dunn Loring, VA; SR 267 in Idylwood, VA
- East end: US 29 in Washington, D.C.

Location
- Country: United States
- States: Virginia, District of Columbia
- Counties: VA: Frederick, Warren, Fauquier, Prince William, Fairfax, Arlington; DC: City of Washington

Highway system
- Interstate Highway System; Main; Auxiliary; Suffixed; Business; Future
- Virginia Routes; Interstate; US; Primary; Secondary; Byways; History; HOT lanes
- Streets and Highways of Washington, DC; Interstate; US; DC; State-Named Streets
← SR 65	VA	→ SR 67
← US 50	DC	→ I-95

Interstate 66 (I-66) is a 76.32 mile east–west interstate highway in the eastern United States. The highway runs from an interchange with I-81 near Middletown, Virginia, on its western end to an interchange with U.S. Route 29 (US 29) in Washington, D.C., at the eastern terminus. The route parallels State Route 55 (SR 55) from its western terminus at I-81 to Gainesville, Virginia, and US 29 from Gainesville to its eastern terminus in Washington. I-66 is unrelated to US 66, which was located in the Midwest-West region of the United States.

The E Street Expressway is a spur from I-66 into the Foggy Bottom neighborhood of Washington, D.C.

Planned expansions of I-66, including an auxiliary route, I-266, were ended by community opposition in the 1970s. I-266 would have begun in Arlington, Virginia, and terminated in Washington at K Street NW.

== Route description ==
Lengths
	mi	km
VA	74.8	120.54
DC	1.6	2.57
Total	76.4	123.11

=== Virginia ===
==== Interstate 81 to Dunn Loring ====
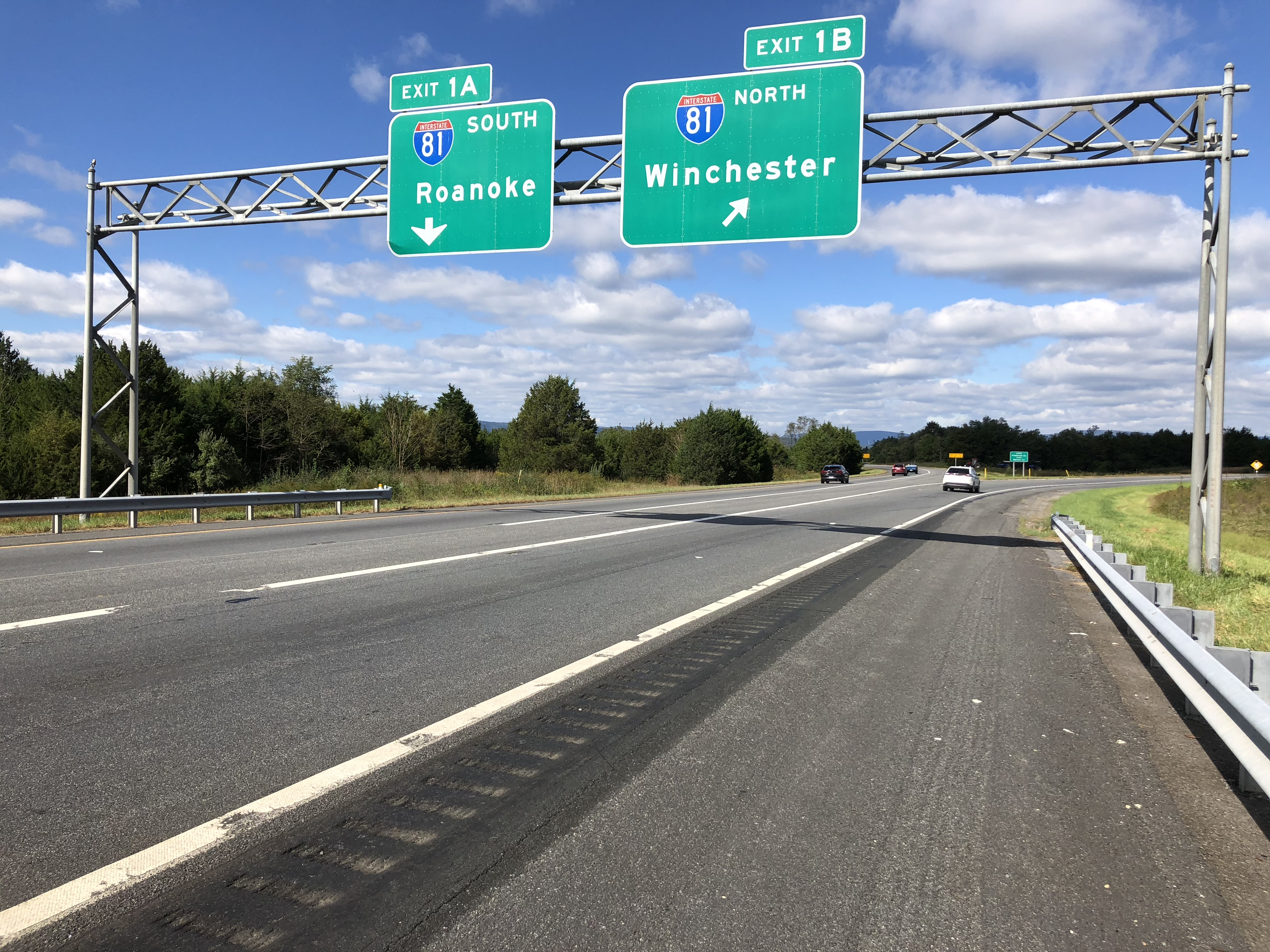
Western terminus of I-66 at the interchange with I-81 in Middletown, Virginia

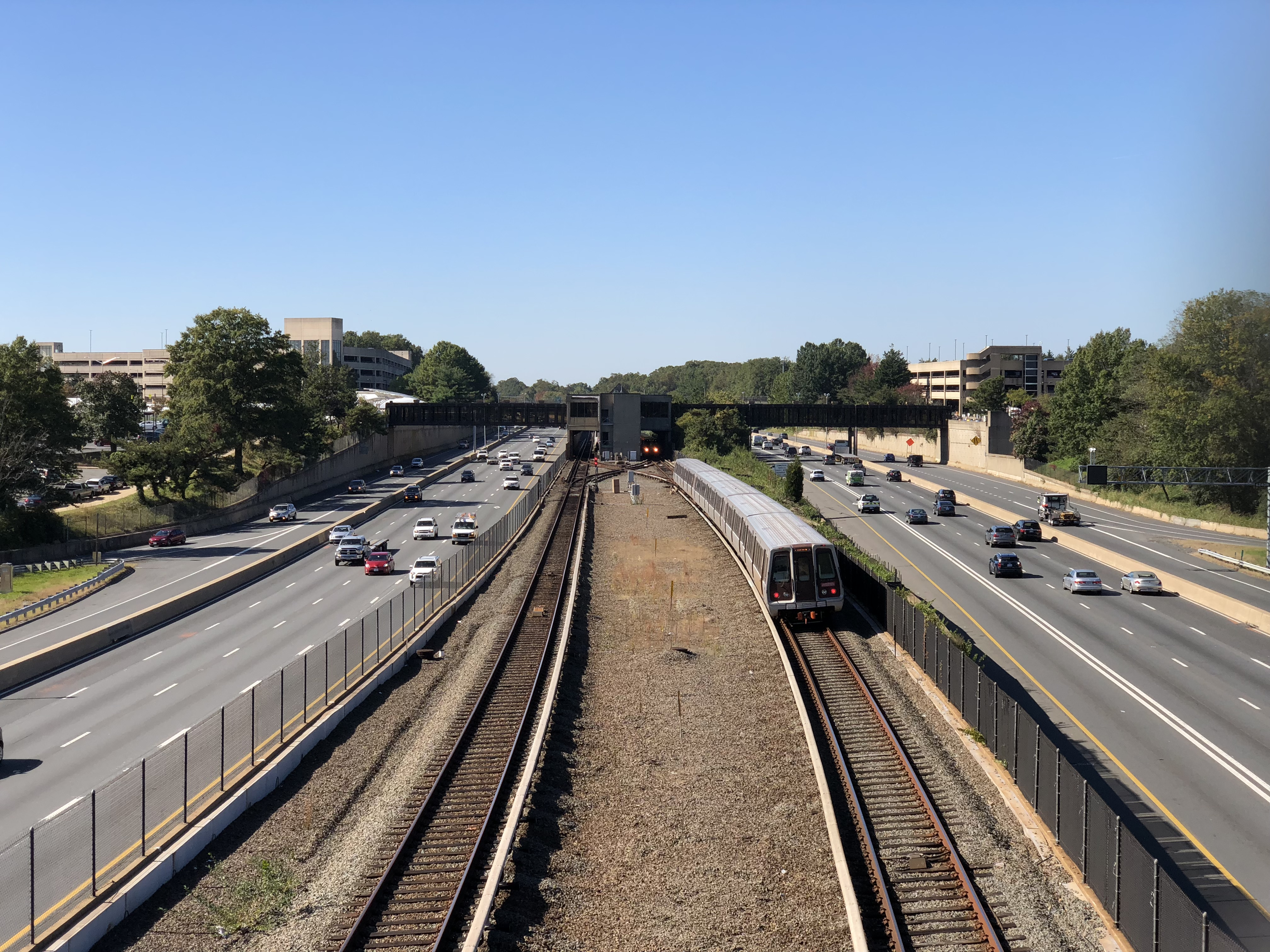
I-66 in Oakton, with a Washington Metro train using the tracks in the median

I-66 begins at a directional T interchange with I-81 near Middletown, Virginia. It heads east as a four-lane freeway and meets US 522/US 340 at a partial cloverleaf interchange. The two routes head south to Front Royal and north to Lake Frederick. I-66 continues east and crosses the Blue Ridge at Manassas Gap, paralleling SR 55 (John Marshall Highway) and meeting US 17 at a partial interchange with no access from eastbound I-66 to northbound US 17. SR 55 also merges onto the freeway at this interchange, forming a three-way concurrency that ends near Marshall, with SR 55 leaving along with U.S. Route 17 Business (US 17 Bus.) at a diamond interchange and US 17 leaving at the next exit, also at a diamond interchange. The freeway then passes through Bull Run Mountain at Thoroughfare Gap.

Expanding to six lanes, and continuing to parallel SR 55, I-66 enters the towns of Haymarket and Gainesville, reaching the diverging diamond interchange with US 15 (James Madison Highway) and the partial cloverleaf interchange with US 29 (Lee Highway) in each town, respectively. The highway then expands to ten lanes (with HOT lanes) and heads to the south of Manassas National Battlefield Park and to the north of Bull Run Regional Park, after meeting SR 234 (Prince William Parkway) at a trumpet interchange. The highway reaches a partial cloverleaf interchange with US 29 and passes to the north of Centreville and meets SR 28 (Sully Road), SR 620 (Braddock Road), and SR 657 (Walney Road) at an interchange with cloverleaf and stack elements to it. SR 28 heads north as a freeway to Dulles International Airport and south as an arterial to Manassas.

The freeway then meets SR 286 (Fairfax County Parkway), US 50 (Little River Turnpike), and SR 123 (Chain Bridge Road) at a series of interchanges providing access to D.C. suburbs. The Orange Line and Silver Line of the Washington Metro begin to operate in the median here, as the highway reaches a large interchange with the I-495 (Capital Beltway).

I-66 has four variably tolled HOT lanes from US 29 in Gainesville to the Capital Beltway, meaning the price depends on the traffic. It is often called the I-66 Express Lanes Outside the Beltway.

==== Dunn Loring to Theodore Roosevelt Bridge ====
The section of I-66 in Virginia east of I-495, often called I-66 Inside the Beltway, is officially named the Custis Memorial Parkway. It is a toll road during peak hours. The road narrows to four lanes as it heads through Arlington County. The parkway meets SR 7 (Leesburg Pike) at a full interchange. SR 267 (Dulles Toll Road) meets the parkway with an eastbound entrance and westbound exit. Continuing through neighborhoods, the route yet again meets US 29 at an incomplete interchange and continues east into Arlington County, meeting SR 120 (Glebe Road) and continuing to Arlington County. It meets Spout Run Parkway and enters Rosslyn. The freeway turns southeast and runs in between US 29 as it approaches the Theodore Roosevelt Bridge, reaching another eastbound entrance and westbound exit as US 29 continues north on the Key Bridge. It then has a complex interchange with George Washington Parkway and SR 110 (Richmond Highway), providing access to Alexandria and the Pentagon, respectively. US 50 (Arlington Boulevard) merges onto the highway with a westbound exit and eastbound entrance and the two traverse the bridge.

The "Custis Memorial Parkway" name commemorates the Custis family, several of whose members (including Martha Dandridge Custis Washington, George Washington Parke Custis, Eleanor "Nelly" Parke Custis Lewis and Mary Anna Randolph Custis Lee) played prominent roles in Northern Virginia's history. Because of its terminus in the Shenandoah Valley, some early planning documents refer to I-66 as the "Shenandoah Freeway," although the name did not enter common use.

Between the Capital Beltway and the Theodore Roosevelt Bridge, the eastbound (inbound) roadway is a high-occupancy toll (HOT) road from 5:30 to 9:30 am, and the westbound (outbound) roadway is an HOT road from 3:00 to 7:00 pm. (Westbound tolling begins after exit 73 to US 29, in order to allow traffic crossing the bridge an opportunity to transfer to free roads.) E-ZPass is required for all vehicles except motorcycles, including Dulles Airport users. I-66 is free during those times for HOV-3+ drivers with an E-ZPass Flex and for motorcycles. Other drivers must pay a variable toll depending on traffic levels. Outside of these hours, I-66 is free for all drivers to use.

=== Washington, D.C. ===
In Washington, D.C., the route quickly turns north, separating from US 50. The highway interchanges with the E Street Expressway spur before passing beneath Virginia and New Hampshire Avenues in a short tunnel, also running on the east side of the Watergate complex. After an indirect interchange with the Rock Creek and Potomac Parkway (via 27th Street), the highway terminates at a pair of ramps leading to the Whitehurst Freeway (US 29) and L Street. The portion of Interstate 66 within Washington, D.C., is known as the Potomac River Freeway.

==== E Street Expressway ====
E Street Expressway
- Location: Washington, D.C.
- Length: 0.3 mi (480 m)

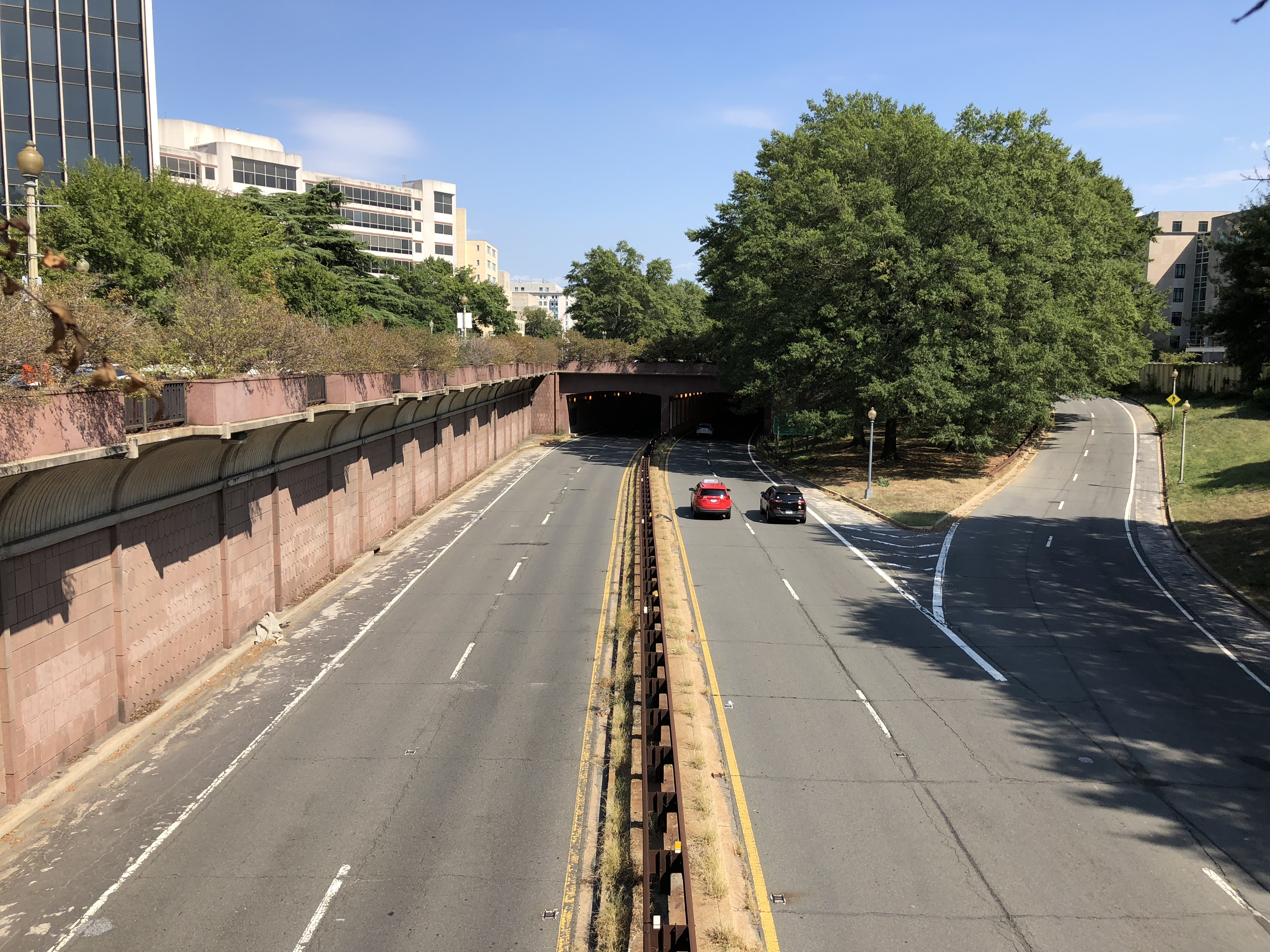
The E Street Expressway just east of I-66

The E Street Expressway is a 480 meter long spur of I-66 that begins at an interchange with the interstate just north of the Roosevelt Bridge. It proceeds east, has an interchange with Virginia Avenue Northwest, and terminates at 20th Street Northwest. From there, traffic continues along E Street Northwest to 17th Street Northwest near the White House, the Old Executive Office Building, George Washington University, and the Corcoran Gallery of Art. Westbound traffic from 17th Street takes a one-block segment of New York Avenue to the expressway entrance at 20th and E streets northwest. The expressway and the connecting portions of E Street and New York Avenue are part of the National Highway System.

In 1963, the construction of the E Street Expressway caused the demolition of multiple buildings of the Old Naval Observatory.

Exit list

The entire route is in the Foggy Bottom neighborhood of Washington, D.C. All exits are unnumbered.

mi	km	Destinations	Notes
0.00	0.00	I-66 to US 29 south (Whitehurst Freeway) – Virginia	Western terminus
0.1	0.16	Virginia Avenue / 23rd Street	Eastbound exit only
0.1– 0.3	0.16– 0.48	Tunnel underneath Virginia Avenue	
0.3	0.48	20th Street / E Street east	Eastern terminus; at-grade intersection
1.000 mi = 1.609 km; 1.000 km = 0.621 mi: Incomplete access

== History ==
=== Virginia ===
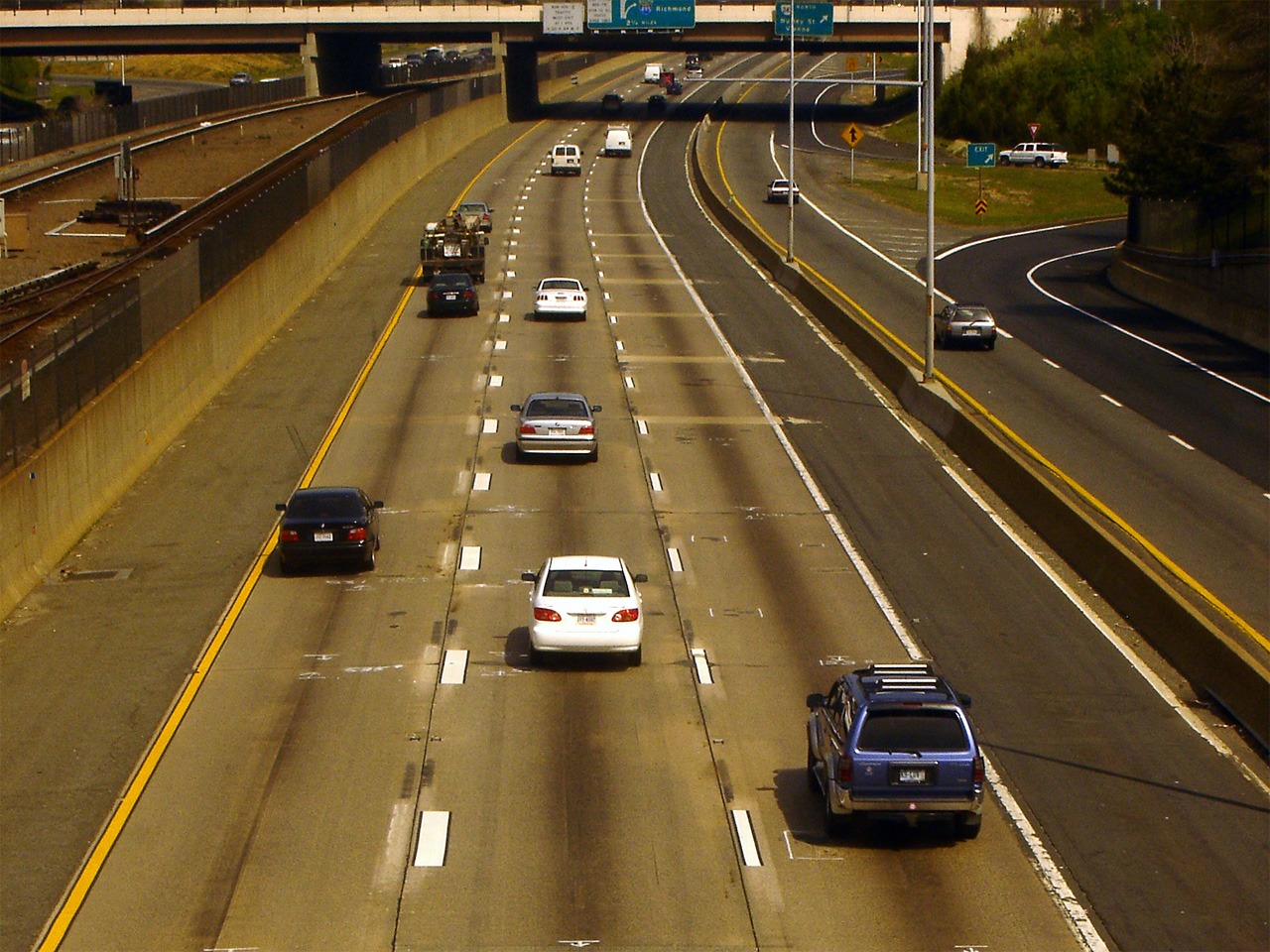
I-66 in Fairfax County with the Metrorail Orange Line in the median. The left lane is an HOV lane, and the right shoulder is used as a travel lane during rush hour; both lanes were widened as part of the Transform 66 project.

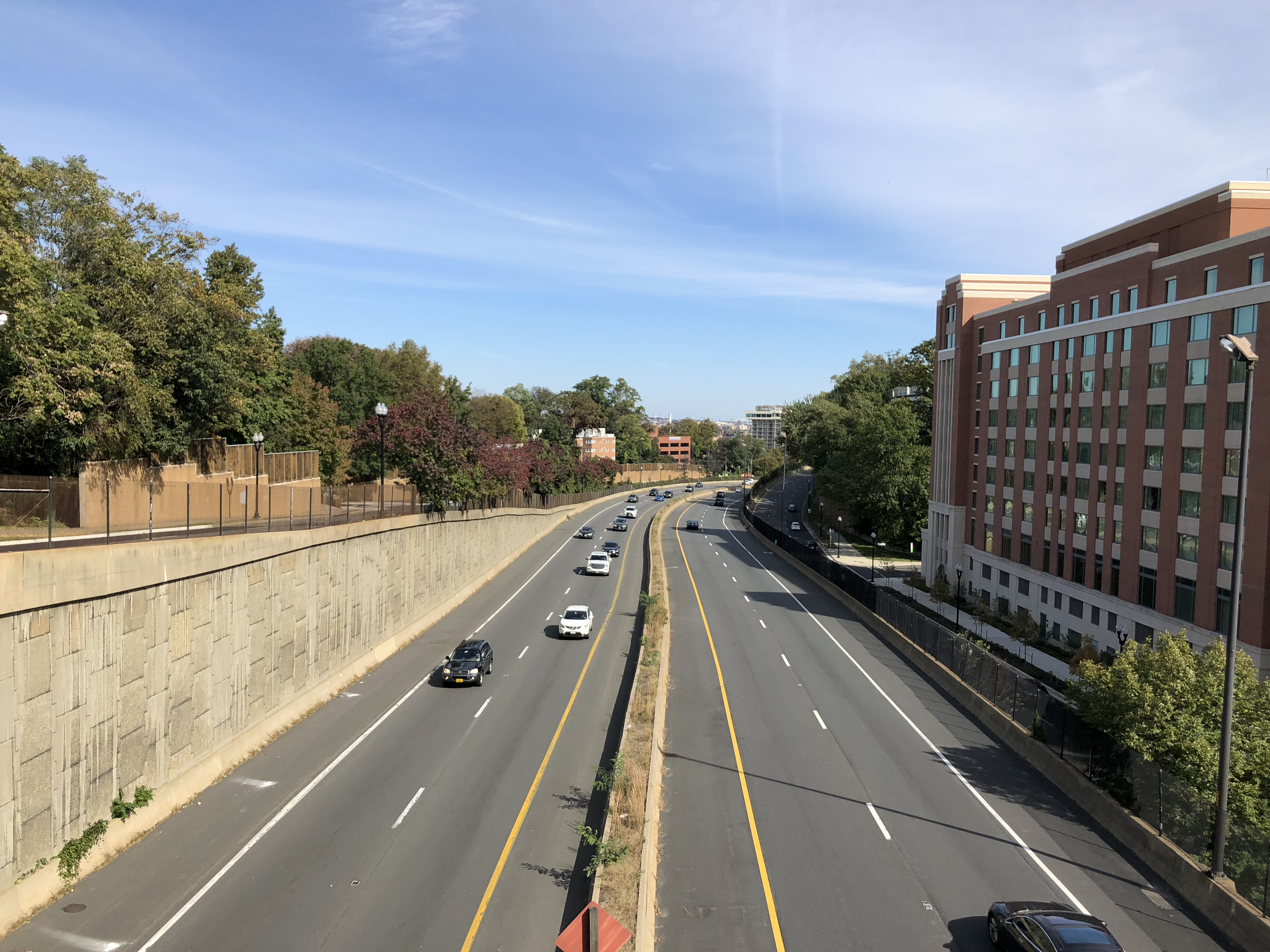
I-66 at Scott Street in Arlington County

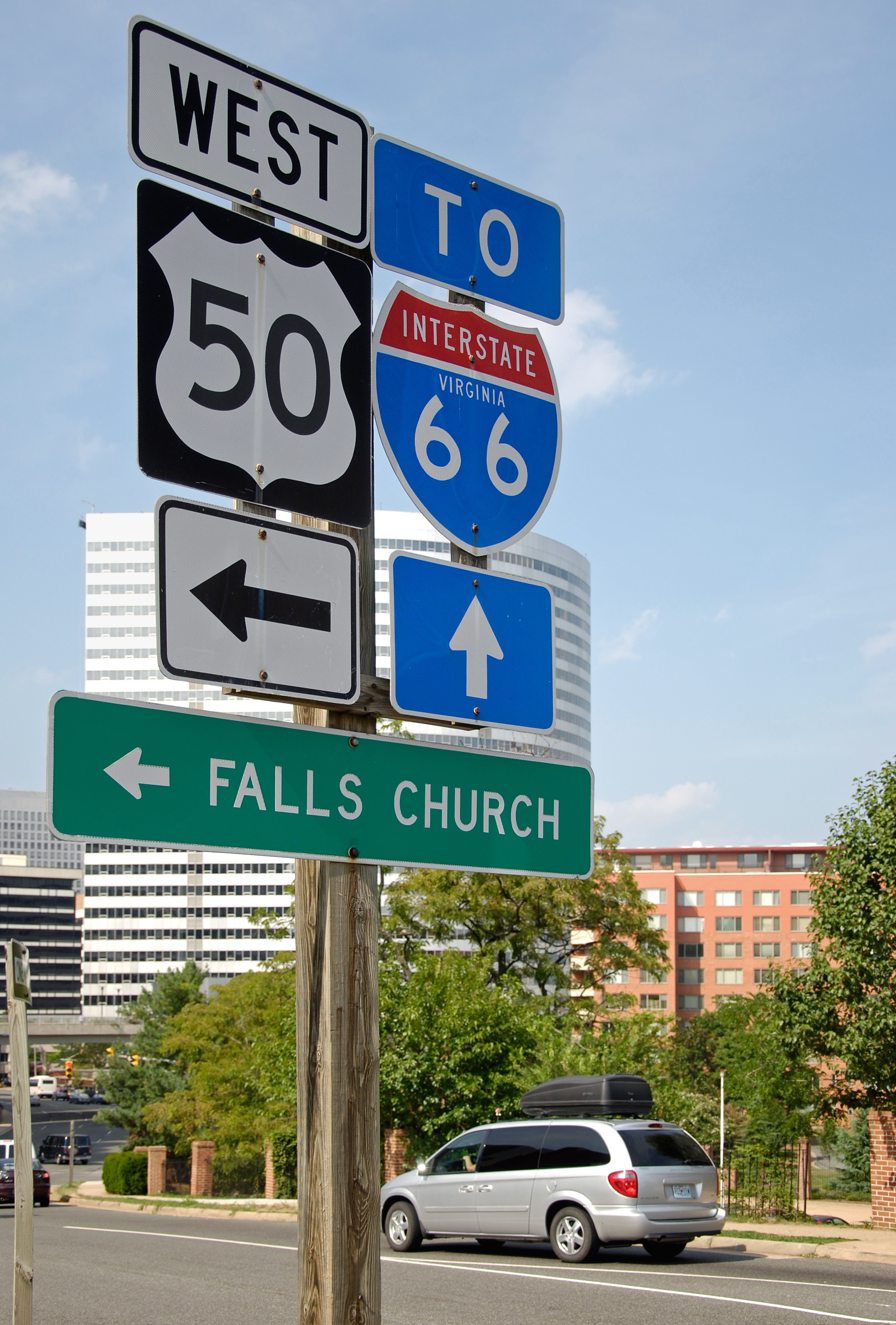
I-66 westbound in Rosslyn

I-66 was first proposed in 1956—shortly after Congress established the Highway Trust Fund—as a highway to connect Strasburg, Virginia, in the Shenandoah Valley with Washington, D.C..

During the planning stages, the Virginia Highway Department considered four possible locations for the highway inside the Beltway; in 1959, it settled on one that followed the Fairfax Drive–Bluemont Drive corridor between the Beltway and SR 120 (Glebe Road); and then along the Rosslyn Spur of the Washington and Old Dominion Railroad (W&OD) between Glebe Road and Rosslyn in Arlington County. The route west of 123 was determined earlier. Two other routes through Arlington neighborhoods and one along Arlington Boulevard were rejected due to cost or opposition. I-66 was originally to connect to the Three Sisters Bridge, but, as that bridge was canceled, it was later designed to connect to the Potomac River Freeway via the Theodore Roosevelt Bridge.

On December 16, 1961, the first piece of I-66, an 8.6-mile-long (13.8 km) section from US 29 at Gainesville to US 29 at Centreville was opened. A disconnected 3.3-mile-long (5.3 km) section near Delaplane in Fauquier County opened next in May 1962.

In July 1962, the highway department bought the Rosslyn Spur of the W&OD for $900,000 (equivalent to $7.32 million in 2025) and began clearing the way, such that, by 1965, all that was left was dirt and the remains of 200 homes cleared for the highway. In February 1965, the state contracted to buy 30.5 miles (49.1 km) of the W&OD from Herndon to Alexandria for $3.5 million (equivalent to $27.2 million in 2025) and the Chesapeake and Ohio Railway, by then the owners of the line, petitioned the Interstate Commerce Commission to let them abandon it. The purchase would eliminate the need to build grade separation where the railroad crossed I-66 and would provide 1.5 miles (2.4 km) of right-of-way for the highway, saving the state millions. The abandonment proceedings took more than three years, as customers of the railway and transit advocates fought to keep the railroad open and delayed work on the highway. During that time, on November 10, 1967, the Washington Metropolitan Area Transit Authority (WMATA) announced that it had come to an agreement with the Highway Department that would give them a two-year option to buy a five-mile (8.0 km) stretch of the right-of-way from Glebe Road to the Beltway, where I-66 was to be built, and run mass transit on the median of it. The W&OD ran its last train during the summer of 1968, clearing the way for construction to begin in Arlington County.

While the state waited on the W&OD, work continued elsewhere. The Theodore Roosevelt Bridge opened on June 23, 1964, and, in November of that year, the section from Centreville to the Beltway opened. A 0.2-mile (0.32 km) extension from the Roosevelt Bridge to Rosslyn opened in October 1966.

After the Virginia Department of Transportation (VDOT; then known as the Virginia Department of Highways) took possession of the mainline W&OD right-of-way in 1968, they began to run into opposition as the highway revolts of the late 1960s and early 1970s took hold. In 1970, the Arlington County Board requested new hearings, and opponents began to organize marches. At the same time, the federal government wanted to pave the right-of-way from Washington Boulevard and Glebe Road to Rosslyn for an experimental busway, which Arlington County opposed, in part because they thought it might delay and add to the cost of I-66. A significant delay was encountered when the Arlington Coalition on Transportation (ACT) filed a lawsuit in Federal District Court in 1971 opposing the Arlington County portion of the project. The group objected to that urban segment due to concerns over air quality, noise, unwanted traffic congestion, wasteful spending, impacts on mass transit, and wasted energy by auto travel. In 1972 the US Fourth Circuit Court of Appeals ruled in favor of ACT, technically blocking any construction. The US Supreme Court upheld the ruling in favor of ACT later that same year.

Again, work continued elsewhere, and, in October 1971, the 6.6-mile-long (10.6 km) section from I-81 to US 340/US 522 north of Front Royal opened.

In July 1974, a final environmental impact statement (EIS) was submitted. The EIS proposed an eight-lane limited access expressway from the Capital Beltway to the area near Spout Run Parkway. Six lanes would branch off at the Parkway and cross the Potomac River via a proposed Three Sisters Bridge. Another six lanes would branch off to the Theodore Roosevelt Bridge. In November, a modified design was submitted, reducing the eight lanes to six. However, in 1975, VDOT disapproved the six-lane design.

The parties then agreed on experts to conduct air quality and noise studies for VDOT, selecting the firm of ESL Incorporated, the expert hired originally by ACT. In 1976, United States Secretary of Transportation William Thaddeus Coleman Jr. intervened. On January 4, 1977, Coleman approved federal aid for a much narrower, four-lane limited access highway between the Capital Beltway and the Theodore Roosevelt Bridge. As part of the deal, Virginia officials agreed to provide more than $100 million (equivalent to $414 million in 2025) in construction work and funds to help build the Metro system, which has tracks down the I-66 median to a station at Vienna in Fairfax County; to build a multiuse trail from Rosslyn to Falls Church; and to limit rush-hour traffic mainly to car pools. Three more lawsuits would follow, but work began on August 8, 1977, moments after US District Court Judge Owen R. Lewis denied an injunction sought by highway opponents.

In the late 1970s and early 1980s, the highway's final miles were built. A 2.9-mile-long (4.7 km) section from Delaplane to US 17 east of Marshall was completed in two sections in 1978 and 1979. The 15.6-mile-long (25.1 km) section from US 340 to Delaplane was completed in August 1979. A 12-mile (19 km) section between US 17 in Marshall and US 15 in Haymarket opened in December 1979, with the gap between Haymarket and Gainesville closed on December 19, 1980. On December 22, 1982, the final section of I-66 opened between the Capital Beltway and US 29 (Lee Highway) in Rosslyn, near the Virginia end of the Theodore Roosevelt Bridge.

The Custis Trail, the trail along I-66 built between Rosslyn and Falls Church as a concession, opened in the summer of 1982, before the highway was complete. SR 267 (Dulles Access Road) between I-66 and the airport opened in 1984. The Metrorail in the median of I-66 between Ballston and Vienna, another concession, opened on June 7, 1986.

After opening, the restrictions on use began to loosen. In 1983, Virginia dropped the HOV requirement from 4 to 3 and then from 3 to 2 in 1994. In 1992, motorcycles were allowed.

On October 9, 1999, Public Law 106-69 transferred the authority for the operation, maintenance, and construction of I-66 between Rosslyn and the Capital Beltway from the federal government to Virginia.

Because I-66 is the only interstate highway traveling west from Washington, D.C., into Northern Virginia, traffic on the road is often extremely heavy. For decades, there has been talk of widening I-66 from two to three lanes each way inside the Capital Beltway (I-495) through Arlington County, although many Arlington residents are adamantly opposed to this plan. In 2004–2005, Virginia studied options for widening the highway inside the Beltway, including the prospect of implementing a one-lane-plus-shoulder extension on westbound I-66 within the Beltway (in an attempt to reduce congestion for people commuting away from D.C.). They later settled on three planned "spot improvements" meant to ease traffic congestion on westbound I-66 inside the Capital Beltway. The first improvement, a 1.9-mile (3.1 km) zone between Fairfax Drive and Sycamore Street, started in summer 2010 and was finished in December 2011. For this project, the entrance ramp acceleration lane and the exit ramp deceleration lanes were lengthened to form a continuous lane between both ramps. The 12-foot (3.7 m) shoulder lane can carry emergency vehicles and can be used in emergency situations. The second one widened 1.675 miles (2.696 km) between the Washington Boulevard onramp and the ramp to the Dulles Access Road. Work on it began in 2013 and finished in 2015. The third project, between Lee Highway/Spout Run and Glebe Road, was completed in 2022.

In Gainesville, Virginia, the Gainesville Interchange Project upgraded the interchange between US 29 and I-66 for those and many other roads due to rapid development and accompanying heavy traffic in the Gainesville and Haymarket area. I-66's overpasses were reconstructed to accommodate nine lanes (six general purpose, two HOV, and one collector–distributor eastbound) and lengthened for the expansion of US 29 to six lanes. These alterations were completed in June 2010. In 2014–2015, US 29 was largely grade-separated in the area, including an interchange at its current intersection with SR 619 (Linton Hall Road). The project began in 2004 and finished in 2015.

==== Transform 66 ====
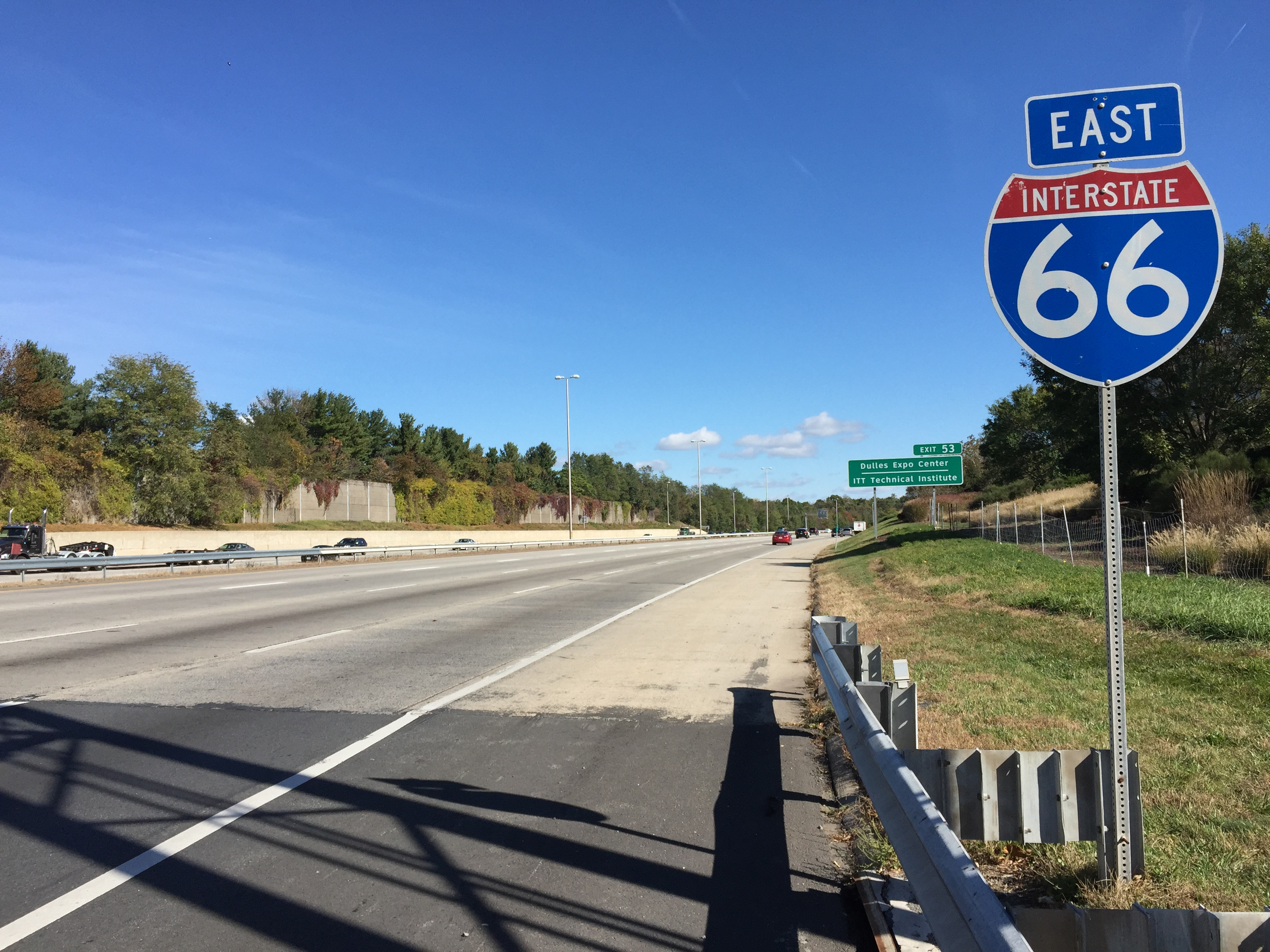
I-66 eastbound past U.S. Route 29 in Centreville, Virginia

The Virginia Department of Transportation announced its public-private partnership with the Virginia Department of Rail and Public Transportation, and the private partner, I-66 Express Mobility Partners, with an estimating $3.7 billion dollars for transportation/road improvements along the I-66 corridor. The project, known as Transform 66, opened to traffic in November 2022 and the HOV rule changed from HOV-2+ to HOV-3+ in early December 2022.

===== Timeline =====
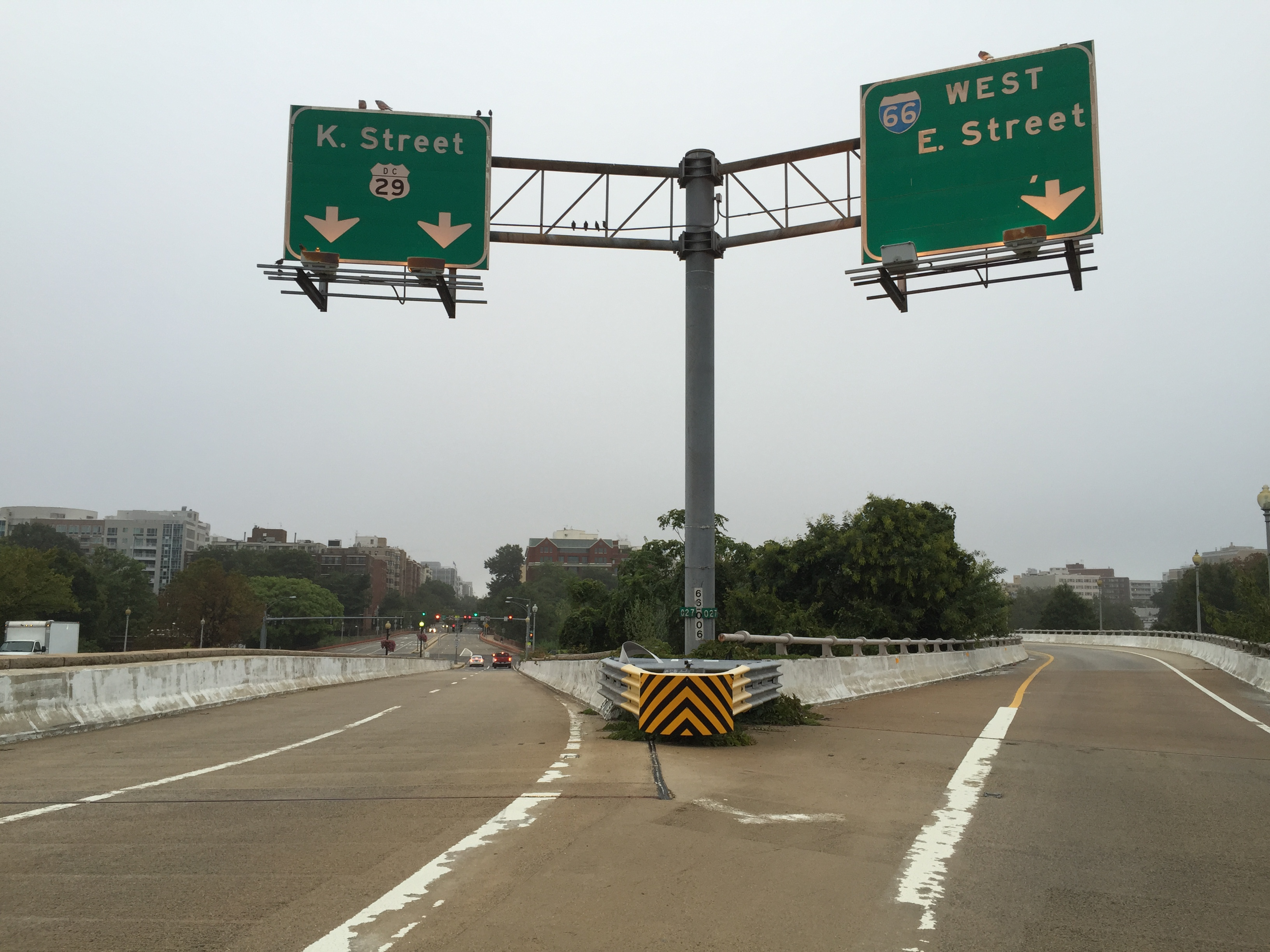
The eastern terminus of I-66 at U.S. Route 29 in Washington, D.C.

In 2015, the Virginia Department of Transportation planning board added I-66 HOT lanes to their list of priority projects for the I-66 corridor. The projects have sparked opposition between residents and community businesses over the direction of this region's future infrastructure planning. The VDOT established a "Transform 66" website on regional traffic issues. Residents living within the I-66 corridor have set up "Transform 66 Wisely", a website describing local community impacts that the VDOT projects may cause. Local business groups and Chambers of Commerce located near the affected areas, however, supported the improvements.

Residents along the I-66 corridor, such as in Arlington County, have resisted I-66 widening proposals for many years. The local Stenwood Elementary School would lose its attached field, leaving it with blacktop-only recess space. In an April 16, 2015, letter to the Virginia Secretary of Transportation, members of the 1st, 8th, 10th, and 11th districts of Congress wrote that VDOT research noted that, during peak hours, 35 percent of eastbound cars and 50 percent of westbound cars are HOV violators.

Future federal steps for VDOT include National Environmental Policy Act (NEPA) review, obligation of federal funds, certification that the conversion to tolled facilities will not "degrade" the existing facility, and potential federal loan guarantee. The Virginia Commonwealth Transportation Board (CTB) is responsible for overseeing VDOT and allocating highway funding to specific projects. The board has 18 members appointed by the Governor, includes the Virginia Secretary of Transportation, Aubrey Layne, and is the group that will be making the final decision and allocating funding for VDOT's plans for I-66.

In 2016, VDOT announced that it was planning to add express lanes and multimodal transportation improvements to I-66 outside the Beltway (the "Transform 66 Outside the Beltway" improvement project). A decision was also made to move forward with widening I-66 eastbound and make multimodal improvements from the Dulles Airport connector to Ballston, the "Transform 66 Inside the Beltway" improvement project.

VDOT also announced during 2016 that it would initiate on I-66 a dynamic tolling system in the peak travel directions during rush hours. On December 4, 2017, VDOT converted 10 miles (16 km) of I-66 between US 29 in Rosslyn and the Capital Beltway to an HOV variable congestion pricing tolling system. The system permits solo drivers to use I-66 during peak travel hours in the appropriate direction if they pay a toll.

VDOT designed the price of toll to keep traffic moving at a minimum of 45 mph (72 km/h) and to increase the capacity of the road. Carpools and vanpools (with three or more people), transit, on-duty law enforcement and first responders do not pay a toll. Prices were as high as $47 one-way during the lanes' first weeks of operations, attracting controversy and national media attention. The average speed during the morning rush hour was 57 mph (92 km/h) versus 37 mph (60 km/h) a year before. In 2023, VDOT reported that the average charge to travel the length of the tolled section was $6.31 in mornings and $5.10 in evenings. Only 0.04% of trips cost more than $40, and it was the first time that any trips at all had crossed that threshold since 2020.

In 2017, construction began on the "Transform 66 Outside the Beltway" improvement project. The project added 22.5 miles (36.2 km) of new dynamically-tolled express lanes alongside I-66 from I-495 to University Boulevard in Gainesville. It also built new park and ride facilities, interchange improvements and 11 miles (18 km) of expanded multi-use trail. The project was completed in November 2022.

Construction on widening eastbound I-66 as part of the "Transform 66 Inside the Beltway" improvement project began in June 2018 and was completed in 2020. The project added a travel lane on eastbound I-66 between the Dulles Access Road and Fairfax Drive (exit 71) in Ballston, and provided a new ramp-to-ramp direct access connection from eastbound I-66 to the West Falls Church station at the SR 7 interchange and provided a new bridge for the W&OD Trail over US 29.

VDOT completed in August 2018 a diverging diamond interchange in Haymarket at the interchange of I-66 with US 15.

=== Washington, D.C. ===
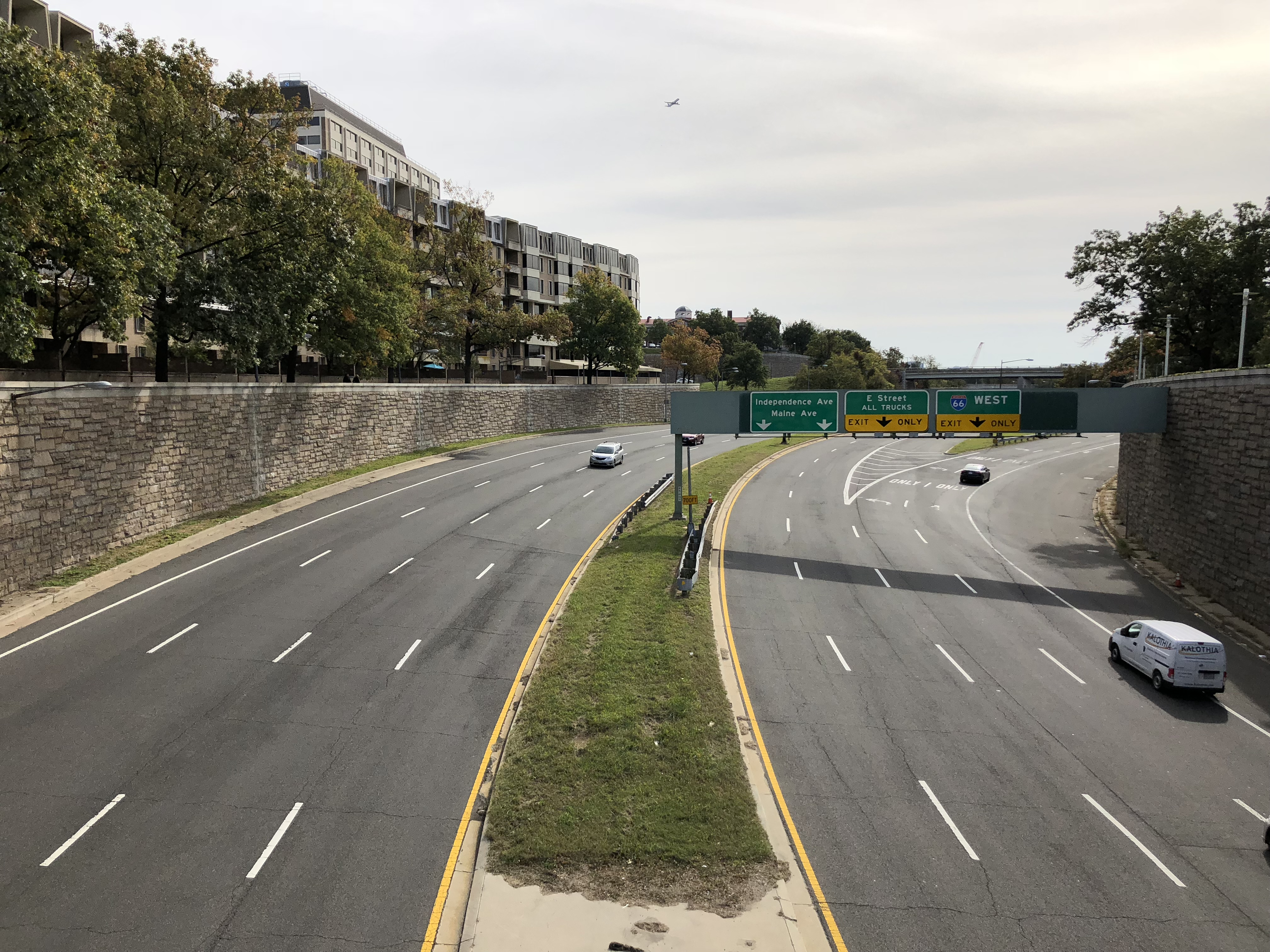
The Potomac River Freeway (I-66) in Washington, D.C.

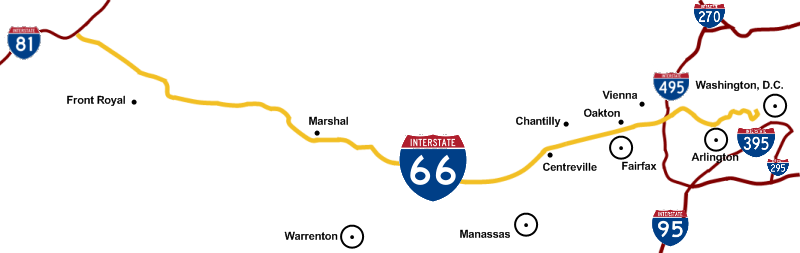
A map of I-66, showing cities and interchanges with I-81 and I-495

In Washington D.C., I-66 was planned to extend east of its current terminus along the North Leg of the Inner Loop freeway. I-66 would have also met the eastern terminus of the planned I-266 at US 29, and the western terminus of I-695 (South Leg Freeway) at US 50; I-266 would have been a parallel route to I-66, providing more direct access to the North Leg from points west, while I-695 would have been an inner-city connector between I-66 and I-95.

The final plans for the North Leg Freeway, published in 1971, outlined a 1.5-mile (2.4 km) six-lane tunnel beneath K Street, between I-266/US 29 and New York Avenue, where the North Leg would emerge from the tunnel and join with the Center Leg Freeway (formerly I-95, now I-395); the two routes would run concurrently for 0.75 miles (1.21 km) before reaching the Washington Union Station interchange, where I-66 was planned to terminate. Despite the plan to route the North Leg in a tunnel beneath K Street, the intense opposition to previous, scrapped alignments for the D.C. freeway network, which included previous alignments for the North Leg Freeway, led to the mass cancelation of all unbuilt D.C. freeways in 1977, resulting in the truncation of I-66 at US 29.

== 66 Parallel Trail ==
In 2023, as part of the Transform 66 – Outside the Beltway Project, a multi-use trail was built along the right-of-way from Gallows Road, located just outside the Beltway in Dunn Loring to a point just west of Rt. 28 in Centreville. The trail is actually four separate trails connected by a combination of on-road bike facilities and sidewalks. There are plans to extend the trail further west to Sudley Road in Prince William County.

== Exit list ==
All exits in the District of Columbia are unnumbered.

State/district	County	Location	mi	km	Old exit	New exit	Destinations	Notes
Virginia	Frederick		0.00	0.00		1	I-81 – Roanoke, Winchester	Western terminus; signed as exits 1A (south) and 1B (north); exit 300 on I-81; tri-stack interchange
Virginia	Warren	Front Royal	6.4	10.3	2	6	US 340 / US 522 – Winchester, Front Royal	
Virginia	Warren		12.9	20.8	3	13	SR 79 to SR 55 – Linden, Front Royal	
Virginia	Fauquier	Markham	18.5	29.8	4	18	SR 688 – Markham	
Virginia	Fauquier	Delaplane	23.3	37.5	5	23	US 17 north / SR 55 west / SR 731 – Delaplane, Paris	Western terminus of US 17 / SR 55 concurrency
Virginia	Fauquier		27.0	43.5	6	27	SR 55 east (US 17 Bus. south) / SR 647 – Marshall	Eastern terminus of SR 55 concurrency; former SR 242 south
Virginia	Fauquier		28.3	45.5	7	28	US 17 south / US 17 Bus. north – Marshall, Warrenton, Fredericksburg	Eastern terminus of US 17 concurrency
Virginia	Fauquier		31.3	50.4	8	31	SR 245 – The Plains, Old Tavern	
Virginia	Prince William	Haymarket	40.5	65.2	9	40	US 15 – Haymarket, Leesburg	Diverging diamond interchange
Virginia	Prince William					♦	I-66 Express east	Western terminus of HOV3+/toll lanes
Virginia	Prince William	Gainesville	43.1	69.4	10	43	US 29 – Gainesville, Warrenton	Signed as exits 43A (south) and 43B (north)
Virginia	Prince William	Gainesville				♦	University Boulevard to US 29	Westbound exit and eastbound entrance from HOV3+/toll lanes
Virginia	Prince William		44.5	71.6	11	44	SR 234 south (Prince William Parkway) – Manassas, Dumfries	Western terminus of SR 234 concurrency
Virginia	Prince William					♦	Balls Ford Road (SR 621)	Westbound exit and eastbound entrance from HOV3+/toll lanes
Virginia	Prince William		47.3	76.1	12	47	SR 234 north / SR 234 Bus. south – Manassas, Manassas National Battlefield Park	Eastern terminus of SR 234 concurrency; signed as exits 47A (south) and 47B (north) westbound
Virginia	Prince William					♦	SR 234 north / SR 234 Bus. south	Eastbound entrance to HOV3+/toll lanes
Virginia	Prince William		48.8	78.5	Rest area			
Virginia	Fairfax	Centreville	52.1	83.8	13	52	US 29 to SR 28 south – Centreville	
Virginia	Fairfax	Centreville–Chantilly line	53.2	85.6	14	53B	SR 28 north – Dulles International Airport	Signed as exit 53 eastbound; no westbound entrance. Direct access to SR 620 (Braddock Rd), and SR 657 (Walney Rd); westbound entrance from SR 620
Virginia	Fairfax	Centreville–Chantilly line	53.2	85.6	14	53A	SR 28 south – Centreville	Westbound exit and eastbound entrance
Virginia	Fairfax	Centreville–Chantilly line					SR 28 north – Dulles International Airport	Access from HOV3+/toll lanes
Virginia	Fairfax	Fair Lakes	54.9	88.4		♦	Stringfellow Road (SR 645)	Westbound exit and eastbound entrance from HOV3+/toll lanes
Virginia	Fairfax	Fair Lakes	55.9	90.0	15	55	SR 286 (Fairfax County Parkway) – Springfield, Reston, Herndon	Signed as exits 55A (south) and 55B (north)
Virginia	Fairfax	Fair Oaks	57.1	91.9		♦	Monument Drive (SR 6751)	Access from HOV3+/toll lanes
Virginia	Fairfax	Fair Oaks	58.1	93.5	16	57	US 50 – Fair Oaks, Fairfax	Signed as exits 57A (east) and 57B (west)
Virginia	Fairfax	Fair Oaks	58.1	93.5			US 50 west – Fair Oaks	Westbound exit and eastbound entrance from HOV3+/toll lanes
Virginia	Fairfax	Oakton	60.1	96.7	17	60	SR 123 – Fairfax, Vienna	
Virginia	Fairfax	Oakton	60.1	96.7			SR 123 – Fairfax, Vienna	Access via HOV3+/toll lanes
Virginia	Fairfax	Oakton				♦	Vaden Drive - Vienna/Fairfax-GMU Station	Eastbound exit and westbound entrance from HOV3+/toll lanes
Virginia	Fairfax	Oakton	61.6	99.1	17A	62	Vienna/Fairfax-GMU Station	Accessible via C/D lanes. Signed as 62A (Vienna/Fairfax - GMU) and 62B (Nutley Street) in the westbound direction
Virginia	Fairfax	Oakton–Merrifield line	62.5	100.6	17A	62	SR 243 (Nutley Street) – Vienna, Fairfax	Accessible via C/D lanes. Signed as 62A (Vienna/Fairfax - GMU) and 62B (Nutley Street) in the westbound direction
Virginia	Fairfax	Dunn Loring–Merrifield– Idylwood tripoint	65.1	104.8	18	64A	I-495 south – Richmond, Alexandria	Signed as exit 64 westbound; exit 49 on I-495
Virginia	Fairfax	Dunn Loring–Merrifield– Idylwood tripoint	65.1	104.8	18	64B	I-495 north – Tysons Corner, Baltimore	Eastbound exit and westbound entrance; exit 49 on I-495
Virginia	Fairfax	Dunn Loring–Merrifield– Idylwood tripoint	65.1	104.8		—	I-495 Express – Richmond, Baltimore	Eastbound exit and westbound entrance
Virginia	Fairfax	Dunn Loring–Merrifield– Idylwood tripoint	65.1	104.8		♦	I-495 / I-495 Express – Tysons Corner, Baltimore, Richmond, Alexandria	Eastbound exit and westbound entrance from HOV3+/toll lanes only
Virginia	Fairfax	Idylwood				♦	I-66 Express west	Eastern terminus of HOV3+/toll lanes
Virginia	Fairfax	Idylwood			Toll gantry (non-HOV3+ vehicles, peak-direction only)			
Virginia	Fairfax	Pimmit Hills–Idylwood line	66.0	106.2	19	66	SR 7 (Leesburg Pike) – Tysons Corner, Falls Church	Signed as exits 66A (east) and 66B (west) westbound; serves West Falls Church station
Virginia	Fairfax	Pimmit Hills–Idylwood line	66.6	107.2	20	67	SR 267 west to I-495 north – Dulles International Airport, Baltimore	Westbound exit and eastbound entrance; eastern terminus of SR 267
Virginia	Fairfax	Westhampton			Toll gantry (non-HOV3+ vehicles, peak-direction only)			
Virginia	Arlington	East Falls Church	67.8	109.1	21	68	Westmoreland Street	Eastbound exit only
Virginia	Arlington	East Falls Church	68.4	110.1	22	69	US 29 / SR 237 (Washington Boulevard / Lee Highway)	Eastbound exit and westbound entrance; serves East Falls Church station
Virginia	Arlington	East Falls Church			23	69	Sycamore Street – Falls Church	Westbound exit and eastbound entrance; serves East Falls Church station
Virginia	Arlington	Bluemont			Toll gantry (non-HOV3+ vehicles, peak-direction only)			
Virginia	Arlington	Ballston	70.5	113.5	24	71	SR 120 (Glebe Road) / SR 237 (Fairfax Drive)	Serves Ballston–MU station
Virginia	Arlington	Cherrydale			Toll gantry (non-HOV3+ vehicles, peak-direction only)			
Virginia	Arlington	Maywood	72.1	116.0	25	72	US 29 (Lee Highway) / Spout Run Parkway	Eastbound exit and westbound entrance
Virginia	Arlington	Rosslyn	73.1	117.6	26	73	US 29 (Lee Highway) – Rosslyn, Key Bridge	
Virginia	Arlington	Rosslyn	74.2	119.4	27	75	SR 110 south – Pentagon, Alexandria	Eastbound exit and westbound entrance
Virginia–D.C. line	Arlington–Washington, D.C. line		74.8 0.0	120.4 0.0	Theodore Roosevelt Bridge over the Potomac River			
Virginia–D.C. line	Arlington–Washington, D.C. line		0.1	0.16		—	US 50 west (Arlington Boulevard) / George Washington Parkway north	Western terminus of US 50 concurrency; westbound exit and eastbound entrance
District of Columbia	Washington	Foggy Bottom	0.5	0.80		—	Independence Avenue	Eastbound exit only
District of Columbia	Washington	Foggy Bottom	0.5	0.80		—	US 50 east (Constitution Avenue) – Downtown	Eastern terminus of US 50 concurrency; eastbound exit and westbound entrance
District of Columbia	Washington	Foggy Bottom	0.7	1.1		—	E Street Expressway east	Western terminus of the E Street Expressway
District of Columbia	Washington	Foggy Bottom	0.8	1.3		—	Kennedy Center	Westbound entrance only
District of Columbia	Washington	Foggy Bottom	0.9	1.4		—	Independence Avenue / Maine Avenue	Westbound exit and eastbound entrance
District of Columbia	Washington	Foggy Bottom	1.2	1.9		—	Rock Creek Parkway	Eastbound exit and westbound entrance
District of Columbia	Washington	Foggy Bottom	1.4	2.3		—	Pennsylvania Avenue	Eastbound exit only
District of Columbia	Washington	Foggy Bottom–Georgetown line	1.6	2.6		—	Whitehurst Freeway (US 29 south) to Canal Road	Eastern terminus
1.000 mi = 1.609 km; 1.000 km = 0.621 mi: Concurrency terminus; Electronic toll collection; HOV only; Incomplete access

== Cancelled auxiliary route ==
Interstate 266
- Location: Arlington County, Virginia–Washington, D.C.
- Length: 1.79 mi (2.88 km)

Interstate 266 (I-266) was a proposed loop route of I-66 between Washington, D.C., and Arlington County, Virginia. D.C. officials proposed designating the route Interstate 66N, a move opposed by AASHTO. In Virginia, I-266 would have split off from I-66 just east of the present SR 124 (Spout Run Parkway) exit. From there, it would have followed an expanded Spout Run Parkway, crossed the George Washington Memorial Parkway, and crossed the Potomac River across a new bridge that would have been called the Three Sisters Bridge. Upon entering D.C., it would have followed Canal Road and an expanded US 29 (Whitehurst Freeway) to rejoin I-66 at K Street. I-266 was canceled in 1972 in the face of community opposition during Washington, D.C.'s freeway revolts. It would have been the only auxiliary route of I-66.
