= Merrifield, Virginia =

- Census-designated place
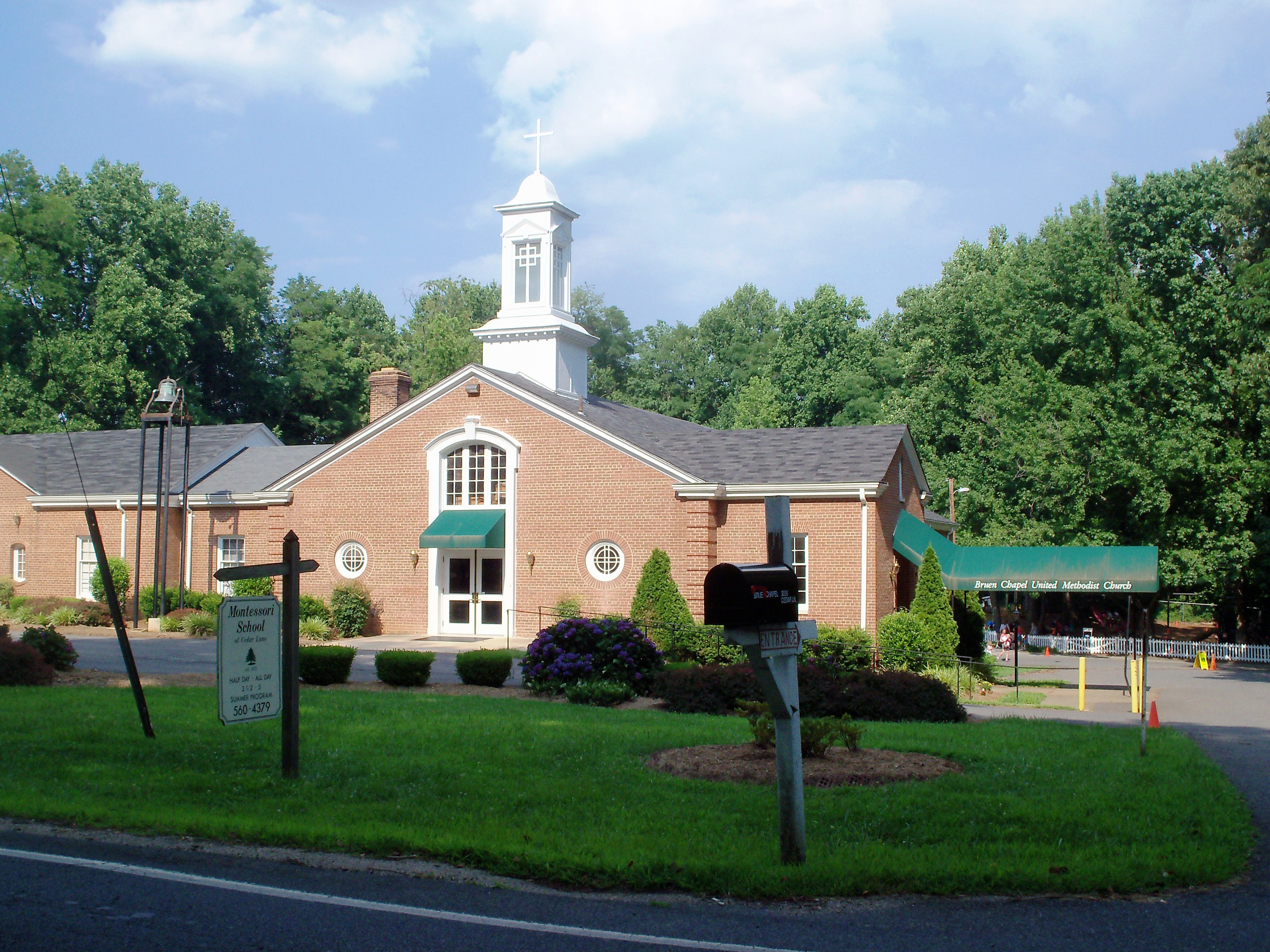
- A church in Merrifield

- Location of Merrifield in Fairfax County, Virginia

- Location within Northern Virginia Location within Virginia Location within the United States
- Coordinates: 38°52′23″N 77°14′35″W
- Country: United States
- State: Virginia
- County: Fairfax

Area
  - Total: 2.72 sq mi (7.05 km^{2})
  - Land: 2.71 sq mi (7.03 km^{2})
  - Water: 0.0077 sq mi (0.02 km^{2})
- Elevation: 360 ft (110 m)

Population (2020)
  - Total: 20,488
  - Density: 5,600/sq mi (2,163/km^{2})
- Time zone: UTC−5 (Eastern (EST))
  - Summer (DST): UTC−4 (EDT)
- Area code: 703
- FIPS code: 51-51192
- GNIS feature ID: 1493280

Merrifield is a census-designated place (CDP) in Fairfax County, Virginia, United States. The population was 20,488 at the 2020 census.

== Geography ==
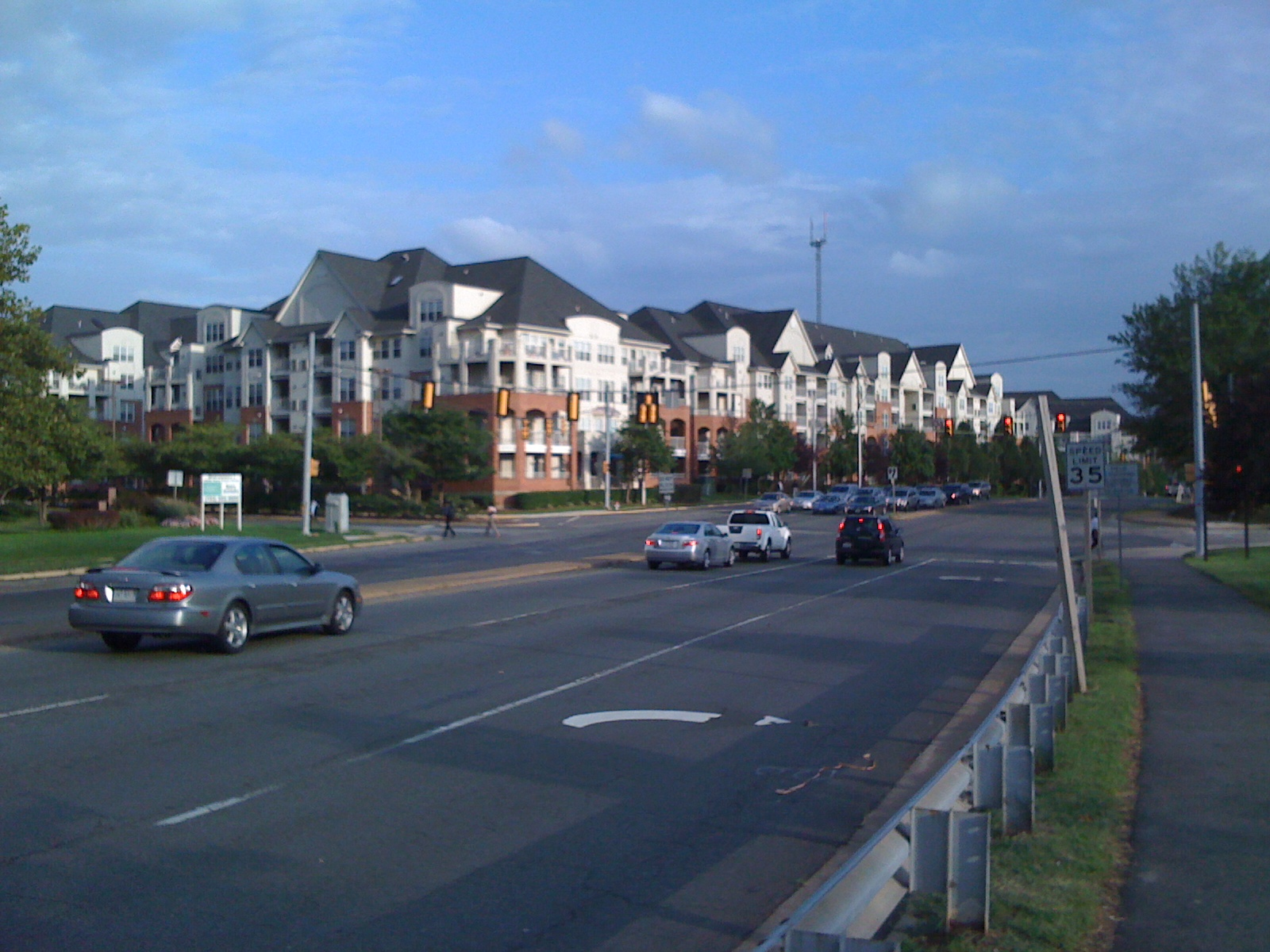
Apartments along Gallows Road in Merrifield in 2010

Merrifield is located in eastern Fairfax County at 38°52′23″N 77°14′35″W (38.873144, −77.242994). It is bounded by I-66 on the north, the Capital Beltway on the east, Arlington Boulevard (U.S. Route 50) on the south, and Nutley Street (Virginia State Highway 243) on the west. Neighboring communities are Oakton to the west, the town of Vienna to the north, Dunn Loring to the northeast, Idylwood and West Falls Church to the east, Annandale at the southeastern corner of Merrifield, Woodburn and Mantua to the south, and the city of Fairfax to the southwest. Downtown Washington, D.C., is 13 miles (21 km) to the east.

According to the United States Census Bureau, the CDP has a total area of 2.7 square miles (7.0 km^{2}), of which 0.01 square miles (0.02 km^{2}), or 0.23%, is water.

== Demographics ==
=== Racial and ethnic composition ===
Merrifield CDP, Virginia – Racial and ethnic composition Note: the US Census treats Hispanic/Latino as an ethnic category. This table excludes Latinos from the racial categories and assigns them to a separate category. Hispanics/Latinos may be of any race.
Race / Ethnicity (NH = Non-Hispanic)	Pop 2000	Pop 2010	Pop 2020	% 2000	% 2010	% 2020
White alone (NH)	5,340	6,156	8,349	47.81%	40.47%	40.75%
Black or African American alone (NH)	648	849	1,334	5.80%	5.58%	6.51%
Native American or Alaska Native alone (NH)	20	37	37	0.18%	0.24%	0.18%
Asian alone (NH)	3,338	5,351	6,386	29.88%	35.18%	31.17%
Native Hawaiian or Pacific Islander alone (NH)	10	7	12	0.09%	0.05%	0.06%
Other race alone (NH)	18	58	96	0.16%	0.38%	0.47%
Mixed race or Multiracial (NH)	354	456	1,181	3.17%	3.00%	5.76%
Hispanic or Latino (any race)	1,442	2,298	3,093	12.91%	15.11%	15.10%
Total	11,170	15,212	20,488	100.00%	100.00%	100.00%

=== 2020 census ===
As of the 2020 census, Merrifield had a population of 20,488. The median age was 33.3 years. 17.1% of residents were under the age of 18 and 8.0% of residents were 65 years of age or older. For every 100 females there were 102.3 males, and for every 100 females age 18 and over there were 101.4 males age 18 and over.

100.0% of residents lived in urban areas, while 0.0% lived in rural areas.

There were 9,072 households in Merrifield, of which 23.5% had children under the age of 18 living in them. Of all households, 39.2% were married-couple households, 25.7% were households with a male householder and no spouse or partner present, and 27.1% were households with a female householder and no spouse or partner present. About 33.9% of all households were made up of individuals and 4.7% had someone living alone who was 65 years of age or older.

There were 9,616 housing units, of which 5.7% were vacant. The homeowner vacancy rate was 0.8% and the rental vacancy rate was 6.3%.

Racial composition as of the 2020 census
Race	Number	Percent
White	8,779	42.8%
Black or African American	1,354	6.6%
American Indian and Alaska Native	97	0.5%
Asian	6,405	31.3%
Native Hawaiian and Other Pacific Islander	14	0.1%
Some other race	1,470	7.2%
Two or more races	2,369	11.6%
Hispanic or Latino (of any race)	3,093	15.1%

=== American Community Survey ===
According to the 2022 American Community Survey, the median income for a household in the CDP was $134,022, and the median income for a family was $166,076. 4.1% of the population were military veterans, and 79.3% had a bachelor's degree or higher. In the CDP 6.4% of the population was below the poverty line, including 5.5% of those under age 18 and 11.1% of those age 65 or over, with 5.6% of the population without health insurance.

=== 2010 census ===
The population was 15,212 at the 2010 census.

=== 2000 census ===
As of the census of 2000, there were 11,170 people, 4,396 households, and 2,725 families residing in the CDP. The population density was 4,107.2 inhabitants per square mile (1,585.8/km^{2}). There were 4,534 housing units at an average density of 1,667.1 per square mile (643.7/km^{2}). The racial makeup of the CDP was 54.67% White, 5.94% African American, 0.25% Native American, 29.94% Asian, 0.10% Pacific Islander, 5.00% from other races, and 4.11% from two or more races. Hispanic or Latino of any race were 12.91% of the population.

There were 4,396 households, out of which 28.1% had children under the age of 18 living with them, 48.7% were married couples living together, 8.8% had a female householder with no husband present, and 38.0% were non-families. 25.0% of all households were made up of individuals, and 3.5% had someone living alone who was 65 years of age or older. The average household size was 2.54 and the average family size was 3.06.

In the CDP, the population was spread out, with 19.4% under the age of 18, 10.3% from 18 to 24, 42.7% from 25 to 44, 21.4% from 45 to 64, and 6.2% who were 65 years of age or older. The median age was 33 years. For every 100 females, there were 102.4 males. For every 100 females age 18 and over, there were 103.3 males.

The median income for a household in the CDP was $70,363, and the median income for a family was $74,116. Males had a median income of $55,653 versus $43,095 for females. The per capita income for the CDP was $32,819. About 5.3% of families and 7.4% of the population were below the poverty line, including 11.5% of those under age 18 and 5.8% of those age 65 or over.

== Education ==
Fairfax County Public Schools operates public schools. The FCPS headquarters are located in the Gatehouse Administration Center within the Merrifield CDP.

== Economy ==
The Mosaic District is a mixed-use complex in the format of an ersatz downtown, with buildings lining urban-style streets.

== See also ==
- Dunn Loring station
