= U.S. Route 50 in Virginia =

Segment of American highway

U.S. Route 50
- US 50 highlighted in red

Route information
- Maintained by VDOT
- Length: 85.96 mi (138.34 km)
- Existed: 1926–present

Major junctions
- West end: US 50 at the West Virginia border near Capon Bridge, WV
- SR 37 in Winchester; US 11 / US 17 / US 522 in Winchester; I-81 in Winchester; US 340 near Boyce; US 15 at Gilberts Corner; SR 28 in Chantilly; I-66 near Fairfax; US 29 in Fairfax; I-495 in Merrifield; SR 27 in Arlington
- East end: I-66 / US 50 at the D.C. border in Arlington

Location
- Country: United States
- State: Virginia
- Counties: Frederick, City of Winchester, Clarke, Fauquier, Loudoun, Fairfax, City of Fairfax, Arlington

Highway system
- United States Numbered Highway System; List; Special; Divided; Virginia Routes; Interstate; US; Primary; Secondary; Byways; History; HOT lanes
← SR 49	→ SR 51

U.S. Route 50 (US 50) is a transcontinental highway which stretches from Ocean City, Maryland to West Sacramento, California. In the U.S. state of Virginia, US 50 extends 86 miles (138 km) from the border with Washington, D.C. at a Potomac River crossing at Rosslyn in Arlington County to the West Virginia state line near Gore in Frederick County.

== History ==
The portion of US 50 in Virginia is steeped in history as a travelway. Native Americans first created it as they followed seasonally migrating game from the Potomac River to the Shenandoah Valley. As English colonists expanded westward in the late 17th and 18th centuries, the Indian trail gradually became a more clearly defined roadway. First on horseback, and then in stage coaches and wagons, in colonial times, travelers from the ports of Alexandria and Georgetown (then in Maryland) followed it to Winchester at the lower end of the Shenandoah Valley for trade. Along the way, small settlements sprang up which provided lodging and provisions for travelers and trade centers for local farmers.

During the American Civil War, the roads which became US 50 were an important travelway for troops, and were the site of significant battles and skirmishes. Among these, the Battle of Chantilly, the Battle of Aldie, as well as Arlington National Cemetery were all located close by.

During the 19th century, the Virginia Board of Public Works encouraged and helped finance internal transportation improvements such as canals, turnpikes, and some of the earlier railroads. In 1806, the Little River Turnpike opened 34 miles (55 km) of macadamized "paved" road from Alexandria to Aldie and the Aldie and Ashby's Gap Turnpike was formed in 1810 to operate a toll road westward to the crest of the Blue Ridge Mountains at Ashby's Gap. The Winchester and Berry's Ferry Turnpike extended from the Ashby's Gap to Winchester.

In 1922, these three privately owned turnpikes were taken over by the Commonwealth of Virginia and became State Route 36. Then in November 1926 the route became part of US Route 50 as designated in the United States Numbered Highway System. At Winchester, the northern end of the Valley Pike, another historic trail, turnpike and toll road pathway steeped in history, intersected US 50 and several other important older roads. (The Valley Pike ran up the Shenandoah Valley southward and was operated in its later years by future Virginia governor and U.S. Senator Harry Flood Byrd before it too was acquired by the state and became U.S. Route 11).

US Route 50 was one of the major east–west transcontinental highways in the grid system of the lower 48 states planned in the 1920s as a successor to the National Auto Trails System. It extended from San Francisco, California to Annapolis, Maryland (later extended to Ocean City, Maryland). Route 50 crosses Virginia near the state's northern borders with Maryland and West Virginia. The east–west major routes in the 1920s national grid system were those with two digit numbers ending with a zero (e.g. US 10, US 20, etc.). Virginia's other east–west highway of this type is US 60, which extends in modern times from Virginia Beach across the middle section of the state to exit west of Covington.

The Loudoun County Board of Supervisors voted to rename the section of US 50 within Loudoun County from John Mosby Highway to Little River Turnpike on December 7, 2021. This is in an effort to restore historical names and remove segregationist and Confederate symbols throughout the county.

The Fairfax County Board of Supervisors voted to rename the section of Route 50 between the border with Loudoun County and Fairfax City from the Lee-Jackson Memorial Highway to just be called Route 50 on September 13, 2022, despite the Fairfax County Confederate names task force preferring to restore the historical name of Little River Turnpike.

== Route description ==
The eastern two-thirds of US 50 in Virginia is substantially paralleled by Interstate 66, although the newer highway gradually diverges to the south after their Fairfax interchange to Front Royal and meets Interstate 81 at Strasburg, about 15 miles (24 km) south of Winchester, where US 50 meets I-81.

=== Frederick County and Winchester ===
U.S. Route 50 enters the state from the West Virginia border, descending from the Appalachian Mountains in Frederick County, the most northern Virginia county, and carrying the name of Northwest Turnpike. It is on a winding, two lane road until it passes the former lumbering town of Gore, at which point it widens to a four-lane highway. It eventually crosses State Route 37 and enters the independent city of Winchester.

Winchester was long the transportation hub of the lower Shenandoah Valley in Virginia. Today, US 50 meets Interstate 81 there, as well as US 11, US 522, and State Route 7. U.S. Route 17 joins US 50 here from its national northern terminus as the route exits the city to the east and crosses the Shenandoah River.

=== Paris, Ashby Gap, Clarke County ===
After crossing the Shenandoah River, the divided four-laned roadway which serves as combined U.S. Routes 17 and 50 ascends into Clarke County and crosses US 340 close to Boyce, a few miles south of Berryville, the county seat.

Just west of Paris, the highway crosses a ridge of the Blue Ridge Mountains at a place known as Ashby Gap. Named for Thomas Ashby, this wind gap was a strategic point for both sides in the American Civil War because whichever side controlled the Gap also controlled access to the northern end of the Shenandoah Valley from the east. In those days before modern communications, Ashbys Gap was also an important location for the military Signal Corps to send and receive visual communications. A few miles west of Upperville, U.S. Route 17 finally separates from US 50 at Paris.

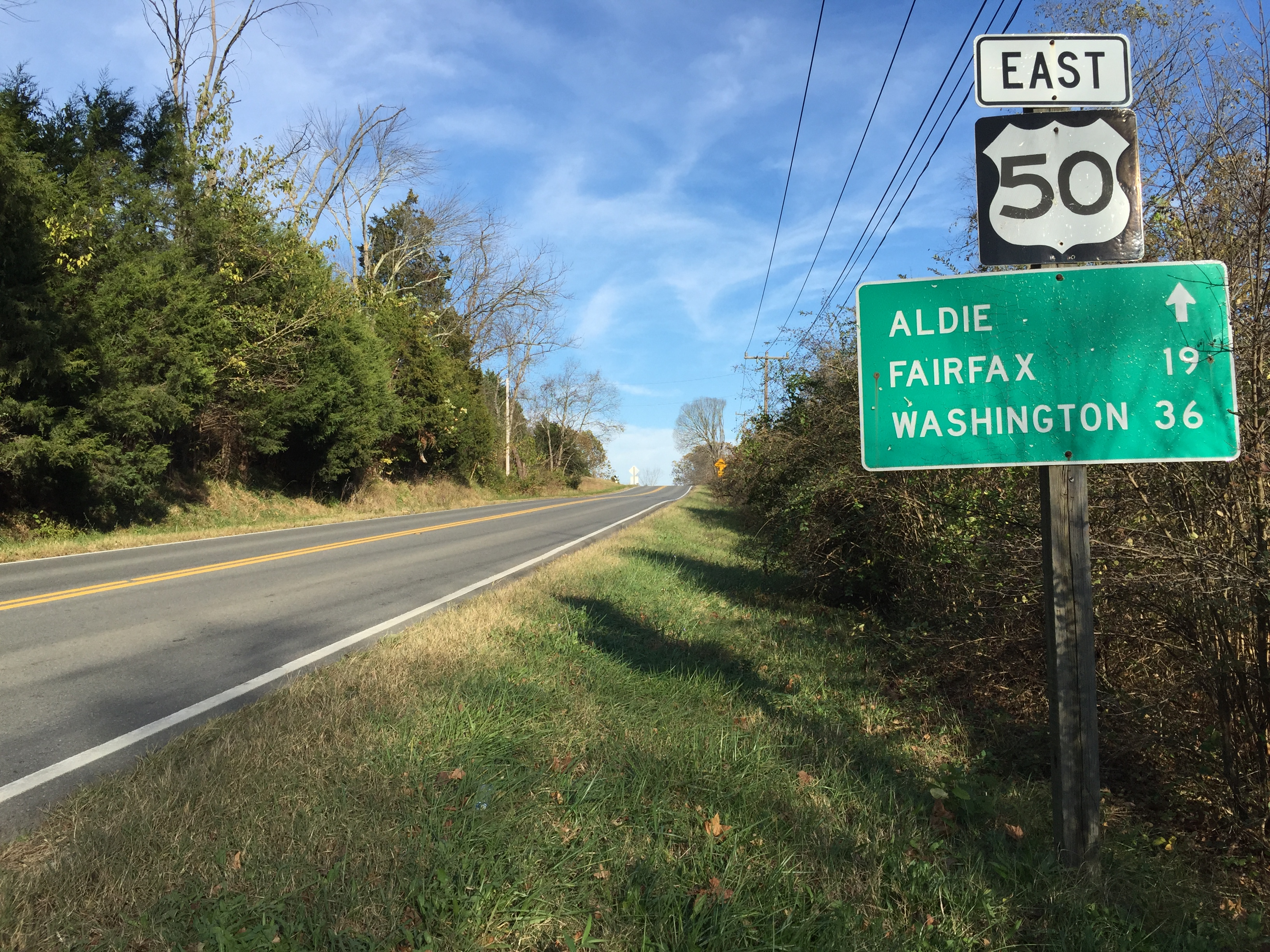
View east along US 50 at SR 629 in Stoke, Loudoun County

=== Fauquier and Loudoun counties ===
West of Fairfax County, US 50 in Virginia is known as the John Mosby Highway in Fauquier County and Little River Turnpike in Loudoun County. During the American Civil War, Colonel John Singleton Mosby was a Confederate partisan who operated with great success in this region, gaining status as a local folk-hero. The Little River is a tributary of the Goose Creek, which itself is a tributary of the Potomac River. The roadway reaches the Town of Upperville, straddles a county line and dipping into Loudoun County along the way. It then passes into the northern edge of Fauquier County.

Upon entering Loudoun County, US 50 exits the Blue Ridge Mountains and enters the Piedmont region. The highway passes across the southeastern portion through the Town of Middleburg, and the communities of Aldie (birthplace of Stonewall Jackson's mother, Julia Beckwith Neale), Gilberts Corner, Arcola, and South Riding. Near Gilberts Corner, it has an intersection with US 15. Starting in Aldie, the highway becomes a 17-mile straightaway until it intersects U.S. 29 in Fairfax City. Within Middleburg, US 50 is known as Washington Street.

=== Fairfax County, City of Fairfax, Arlington County ===
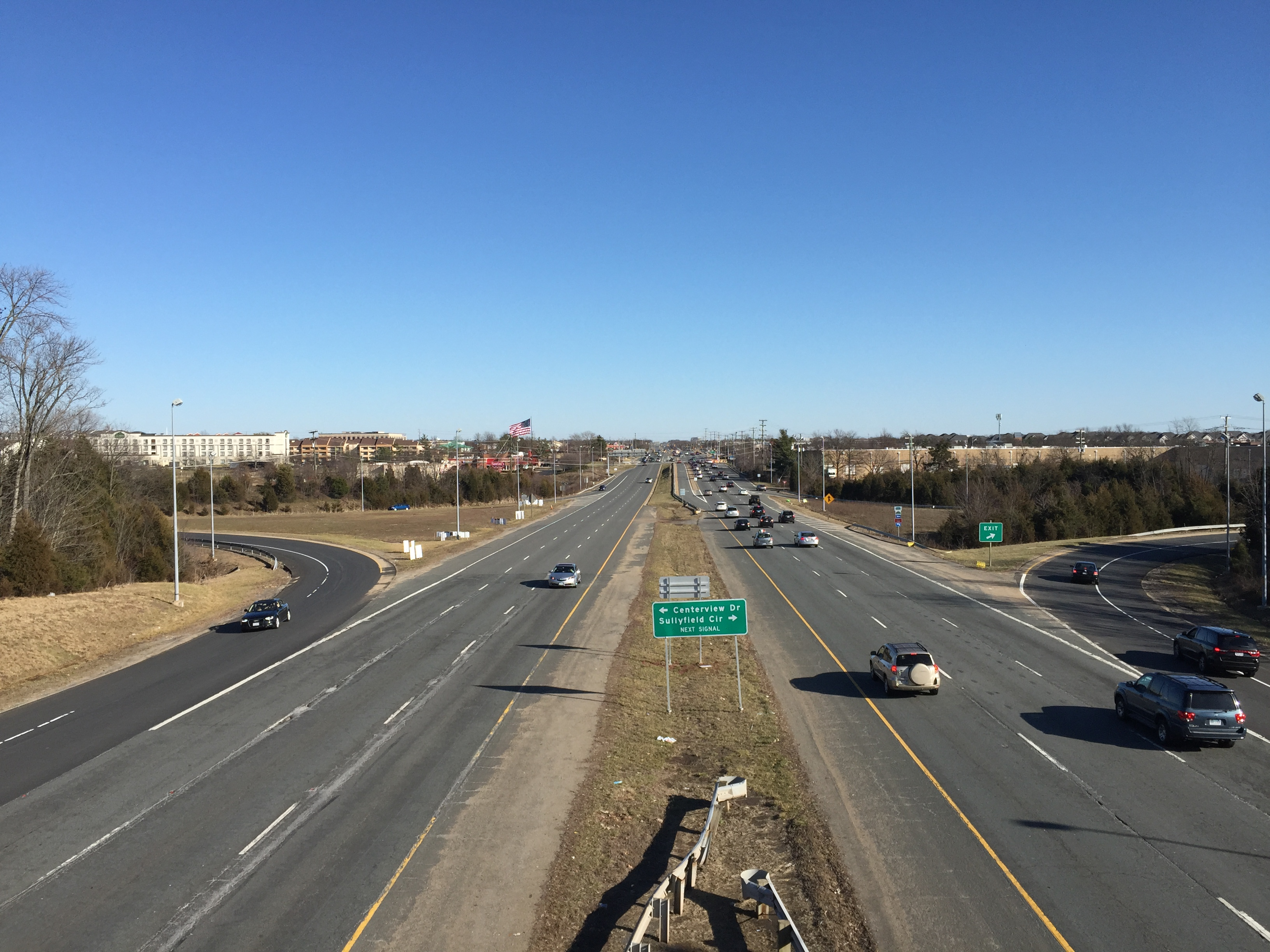
View east along US 50 from SR 28 in Chantilly

Continuing east from the border with Loudoun County, US 50, named Lee-Jackson Memorial Highway until 2023, travels along the historic Little River Turnpike route. Despite Fairfax County's Confederate Names Task Force voting for the restoration of the original Little River Turnpike name, the county still chose to adopt Route 50 as the new name, which placed third out of the five names considered. It passes by the southern edge of Washington Dulles International Airport and the Steven F. Udvar-Hazy Center and through the communities of Chantilly and Fair Oaks.

Shortly after entering the independent city of Fairfax, US 50 leaves Little River Turnpike (its original route until 1935, which continues as Virginia State Route 236) and joins a concurrency with US 29 as Fairfax Boulevard (a new designation, concurrent with the old names Main Street, Lee Highway, and Arlington Boulevard). US 29 splits from US 50 again just before exiting the City of Fairfax.

From this point east into eastern Fairfax County and Arlington County, US 50 is known as Arlington Boulevard. The roadway travels roughly across the center of both counties. In Arlington, it serves as the dividing line for addresses in the county. Finally, the route passes near Rosslyn, a high-density business area of Arlington on its trek toward the Theodore Roosevelt Bridge, where it exits Virginia and passes into Washington, D.C. concurrent with Interstate 66.

== Major intersections ==
County	Location	mi	km	Destinations	Notes
Frederick		0.00	0.00	US 50 west – Romney	Continuation into West Virginia
Frederick		2.97	4.78	SR 259 south (Carpers Pike) – Wardensville	Northern terminus of SR 259
Frederick	Hayfield	8.01	12.89	SR 600 (Hayfield Road) – Gainesboro, Mountain Falls	
Frederick		11.40	18.35	SR 608 (Wardensville Grade) – Mount Williams	
Frederick		14.18	22.82	SR 37 to I-81 / US 11 / US 522 north – Martinsburg, Berkeley Springs, Roanoke	Interchange
City of Winchester		16.30	26.23	US 11 north / US 522 north / US 17 north (South Cameron Street)	Western end of US 11 / US 522 / US 17 concurrency; northern terminus of US 17
City of Winchester		16.69	26.86	US 11 south (Gerrard Street) – Winchester Historic District	Eastern end of US 11 concurrency
Frederick		17.89	28.79	I-81 – Martinsburg, Roanoke	I-81 exit 313
Frederick		18.02	29.00	US 522 south (Front Royal Pike) – Winchester Regional Airport, Front Royal	Eastern end of US 522 concurrency
Clarke	Waterloo	25.12	40.43	US 340 (Lord Fairfax Highway) – Berryville, White Post, Front Royal, Shenandoah National Park, Skyline Drive	
Clarke		27.95	44.98	SR 255 north (Bishop Meade Road) / SR 624 (Red Gate Road) – Millwood	Southern terminus of SR 255
Clarke		31.63	50.90	SR 606 (Mount Carmel Road)	Former SR 276 north
Fauquier	Paris	34.43	55.41	US 17 south to I-66 – Warrenton, Sky Meadows State Park	Eastern end of US 17 concurrency
Fauquier	Upperville	37.85	60.91	SR 712 (Delaplane Grade Road) – Delaplane	
Fauquier		42.77	68.83	SR 611 (St. Louis Road) – Purcellville	
Loudoun	Middleburg	46.14	74.26	SR 626 (Plains Road) – The Plains	
Loudoun	Aldie	50.83	81.80	SR 734 (Snickersville Pike) – Philomont, Bluemont	
Loudoun	Gilberts Corner	52.53	84.54	US 15 (James Monroe Highway) to I-66 – Leesburg, Warrenton	Roundabout
Loudoun		52.90	85.13	Howsers Branch Drive to US 15	Roundabout
Loudoun	South Riding	58.75	94.55	SR 606 (Loudoun County Parkway) – Herndon	
Fairfax	Pleasant Valley	61.68	99.26	SR 609 (Pleasant Valley Road)	
Fairfax	Chantilly	63.57	102.31	SR 28 – Dulles Airport, Centreville	Interchange
Fairfax	Chantilly	64.06	103.09	SR 657 (Centreville Road / Walney Road)	
Fairfax	Chantilly	65.13	104.82	SR 645 (Lees Corner Road)	Western end of SR 645 concurrency
Fairfax	Chantilly	65.59	105.56	SR 645 (Stringfellow Road)	Eastern end of SR 645 concurrency
Fairfax	Greenbriar–Fair Oaks line	66.94	107.73	SR 286 (Fairfax County Parkway) to I-66	Interchange
Fairfax	Fair Oaks	68.05	109.52	SR 608 (West Ox Road)	Interchange
Fairfax	Fair Oaks	68.33– 68.90	109.97– 110.88	Fair Oaks Shopping Center	Interchange; no westbound entrance
Fairfax	Fair Oaks	69.15	111.29	I-66 to I-495 – Washington, Gainesville, Front Royal	I-66 exit 57A/B
Fairfax	Fair Oaks	69.80	112.33	SR 665 (Waples Mill Road) to SR 123 south – Virginia International University, George Mason University	
City of Fairfax		70.00	112.65		
City of Fairfax		70.60	113.62	US 29 south (Lee Highway) / SR 236 east (Main Street) – Old Town Fairfax	Western end of US 29 concurrency, western terminus of SR 236
City of Fairfax		71.47	115.02	SR 123 (Chain Bridge Road) to I-66 – Old Town Fairfax, George Mason University	
City of Fairfax		73.26	117.90	US 29 / SR 237 north (Lee Highway) to I-66 / Old Lee Highway	Fairfax Circle (traffic circle with cut-through); eastern end of US 29 concurrency, western end of SR 237 concurrency
City of Fairfax		73.54	118.35	SR 237 south (Pickett Road) to SR 236 east / SR 655 (Blake Lane)	Eastern end of SR 237 concurrency
Fairfax	Woodburn–Merrifield line	75.83	122.04	SR 650 (Gallows Road) to I-495 Express – Merrifield	Interchange; serves Inova Fairfax Hospital
Fairfax	Merrifield–Annandale– West Falls Church tripoint	76.23	122.68	I-495 (Capital Beltway) to I-66 – Tysons Corner, Richmond	Interchange; exits 50A-B on I-495
Fairfax	West Falls Church–Annandale line	76.57	123.23	Fairview Park Drive to I-495 Express south / US 29 (Lee Highway)	Interchange; signed for I-495 westbound and US 29 eastbound
Fairfax	West Falls Church	78.71	126.67	SR 649 (Annandale Road) – Falls Church, Annandale	
Fairfax	Seven Corners	79.73	128.31	SR 7 to SR 338 – Falls Church, Alexandria	Interchange; also serves SR 613 and East Falls Church station
Arlington	Arlington	81.32	130.87	Carlin Springs Road	Interchange
Arlington	Arlington	82.50	132.77	George Mason Drive – NFATC	Interchange
Arlington	Arlington	82.85	133.33	SR 120 (Glebe Road) – Ballston	Interchange
Arlington	Arlington	83.83	134.91	SR 27 east (Washington Boulevard) to I-395 – Clarendon, Pentagon	Interchange; western terminus of SR 27
Arlington	Clarendon	84.35– 84.75	135.75– 136.39	10th Street North (SR 237 south) / North Courthouse Road / Fairfax Drive	Interchange; eastern terminus of SR 237
Arlington	Rosslyn	85.00	136.79	North Rhodes Street / North Rolfe Street / North Queen Street / 14th Street / Fairfax Drive	Interchange; no westbound entrance
Arlington	Rosslyn	85.40	137.44	North Lynn Street – Key Bridge, Rosslyn, Fort Myer	Interchange; also serves North Meade Street
Arlington	Rosslyn	85.60	137.76	Memorial Bridge / George Washington Parkway south – Arlington Cemetery	Interchange; eastbound exit and westbound entrance
Potomac River		85.96	138.34	US 50 east to I-66 east (Theodore Roosevelt Bridge) – Washington	Continuation into the District of Columbia
1.000 mi = 1.609 km; 1.000 km = 0.621 mi: Concurrency terminus; Incomplete access

U.S. Route 50
Previous state: West Virginia	Virginia	Next state: District of Columbia

< SR 35	Two‑digit State Routes; 1923-1933	SR 37 >
