= List of Virginia Byways =

Virginia Byway
- Highway marker

System links
- Virginia Routes; Interstate; US; Primary; Secondary; Byways; History; HOT lanes

A Virginia Byway is a scenic road designated by the Commonwealth of Virginia as one that can introduce tourists to alternative destinations. According to the Virginia Department of Transportation (VDOT), there are over 3,000 miles (4,800 km) of scenic roads in Virginia, many of which have been designated as Virginia Byways.

The sign design, which features a cardinal, Virginia's state bird, was adopted in January 1975.

== List of Virginia Byways ==
County	Route	Destinations	Endpoints	Designated	Notes
Fairfax	SR 193 (Georgetown Pike)	Great Falls Park	SR 7 (Leesburg Pike) at Dranesville to SR 123 (Dolley Madison Boulevard) at Langley	June 20, 1974	Very winding, highly used commuter route
Charles City / Henrico / James City	SR 5 (New Market Road / John Tyler Highway)	James River plantations	Richmond to Williamsburg	August 21, 1975	part of U.S. Bike Route 76 east of SR 156
Albemarle	SR 20 (Scottsville Road)		I-64 south of Charlottesville to James River in Scottsville	August 19, 1976	part of the Journey Through Hallowed Ground National Scenic Byway (designated October 16, 2009) north of SR 53
Albemarle / Nelson	SR 6 / SR 151 (Irish Road / River Road / Rockfish Valley Highway / Critzers Shop Road)		SR 20 in Scottsville to US 250 near Critzers Shop	August 19, 1976	
Nelson	SR 56 (Crabtree Falls Highway)		Blue Ridge Parkway at Tye River Gap to SR 151 near Roseland	August 19, 1976	
Nelson	SR 151 (Patrick Henry Highway / Rockfish Valley Highway)		SR 56 near Roseland to SR 6 at Martins Store	August 19, 1976	
Rockbridge	SR 39 (Maury River Road)		US 11 near East Lexington to SR 42 in Goshen	January 20, 1977	
Clarke / Frederick	SR 723 (Millwood Road / Carpers Valley Road)	Boyce, Millwood	US 17 / US 50 near Berrys to US 17 / US 50 southeast of Winchester	July 14, 1977	former alignment of US 50
Bath / Rockbridge	SR 39 (Mountain Valley Road)	Jordan Top, Panther Gap	SR 42 in Goshen to West Virginia state line at Ryder Gap	October 27, 1977	
Tazewell	SR 623 (Burkes Garden Road)		SR 61 at Gratton to SR 667 in Burkes Garden	June 22, 1979	
Albemarle / Nelson	US 250 (Ivy Road / Rockfish Gap Turnpike)		US 29 near Charlottesville to Blue Ridge Parkway / Skyline Drive at Rockfish Gap	December 17, 1981	
Culpeper / Fauquier	SR 802 (Springs Road)		SR 229 near Jeffersonton to US 17 Bus. / US 29 Bus. in Warrenton	September 15, 1983	
Fauquier / Loudoun	SR 245 (Old Tavern Road) / SR 626 (Halfway Road)	The Plains	US 17 at Old Tavern to Middleburg	September 15, 1983	former alignment of US 15
Montgomery / Roanoke	SR 785 (Catawba Road / Blacksburg Road)		SR 723 at Lusters Gate to SR 311 near Catawba	May 15, 1986	part of U.S. Bike Route 76; former SR 114
Fluvanna / Goochland / Henrico	SR 6 / SR 650 (River Road)		Scottsville to SR 150 near Tuckahoe	January 15, 1987	
Amherst / Rockbridge	SR 130 (Elon Road / Wert Faulkner Highway)	James River Gorge, Natural Bridge	US 29 Bus. near Madison Heights to US 11 at Natural Bridge	January 15, 1987	
Albemarle	SR 601 / SR 676 / SR 614 (Garth Road)	Owensville	US 29 / US 250 near Charlottesville to SR 810 at White Hall	July 16, 1987	part of U.S. Bike Route 76
Albemarle / Orange	SR 20 (Stony Point Road / Constitution Highway)		US 250 east of Charlottesville to US 15 in Orange	November 19, 1987	part of the Journey Through Hallowed Ground National Scenic Byway (designated October 16, 2009)
Albemarle / Louisa / Orange	SR 22 (Louisa Road) / SR 231 (Gordonsville Road)		US 250 at Shadwell to US 15 / US 33 in Gordonsville	November 19, 1987	part of the Journey Through Hallowed Ground National Scenic Byway (designated October 16, 2009)
Loudoun	US 15 / US 15 Bus. (James Monroe Highway / King Street)	Leesburg	US 50 at Gilberts Corner to Potomac River at Point of Rocks, MD	May 19, 1988	part of the Journey Through Hallowed Ground National Scenic Byway (designated October 16, 2009)
Loudoun	SR 662 (Woodgrove Road / Clarkes Gap Road) / SR 665 (Loyalty Road)	Waterford	SR 9 at Paeonian Springs to SR 663 at Taylorstown	May 19, 1988	
Loudoun	SR 719 (Stoney Point Road) / SR 690 (Mountain Road)	Hillsboro	Round Hill to SR 673 near Elvan	May 19, 1988	
Loudoun	SR 734 (Snickersville Turnpike)	Philomont	SR 7 near Bluemont to US 50 at Aldie	May 19, 1988	part of the first toll road in the U.S.
Loudoun	SR 704 (Harmony Church Road)		SR 7 Bus. in Hamilton to US 15 near Virts Corner	May 19, 1988	
Madison / Orange / Rappahannock	SR 231 (Blue Ridge Turnpike / F.T. Valley Road) / SR 687 (Fairground Road)		US 33 in Gordonsville to US 522 near Sperryville	August 18, 1988	part of the Journey Through Hallowed Ground National Scenic Byway (designated October 16, 2009) south of SR 20 at Old Somerset; followed SR 231 from Pratts to Madison until September 21, 1995
Halifax	SR 654 (Greens Folly Road) / SR 659 (River Road)		US 501 near Centerville to SR 688 at Brooklyn	July 20, 1989	
Chesterfield, Powhatan, City of Richmond	SR 673 (Old Gun Road) / SR 711 (Robious Road / Huguenot Trail)		SR 147 in Richmond to US 522 at Jefferson	February 15, 1990	
Powhatan	SR 617 (Old River Trail)		SR 711 near Jefferson to US 522 at Michaux	February 15, 1990	
Fairfax	SR 5734 (Old Reston Avenue)		SR 6363 (Temporary Road) to SR 675 (Sunset Hills Road) in Reston	March 21, 1990	
Rappahannock	SR 628 / SR 606 / SR 641 (Fodderstack Road) / SR 647 (Crest Hill Road)	Flint Hill	Washington to Rappahannock River (Fauquier County line)	May 17, 1990	
Clarke	SR 255 (Bishop Meade Road) / SR 624 (Red Gate Road)	Millwood	US 340 at Briggs to Warren County line near Milldale	May 17, 1990	
Clarke	SR 627 (Carters Line Road) / SR 622 (Bordens Spring Road) / SR 626 (Nelson Road)		SR 658 near White Post to SR 624	May 17, 1990	
Clarke	SR 628 (Berrys Ferry Road)		US 340 near White Post to SR 626	May 17, 1990	
Clarke	SR 655 (Ginns Road / Salem Church Road) / SR 620 (Pyletown Road / Browntown Road)		SR 644 near Lost Corner to SR 255 near Millwood	May 17, 1990	
Clarke	SR 652 (Janeville Road) / SR 633 (Annfield Road)		SR 620 near Pyletown to US 340 near Briggs	May 17, 1990	
Clarke	SR 651 (Clay Hill Road) / SR 621 (Tilthammer Mill Road)		SR 255 near Claytonville to SR 723 near Berrys	May 17, 1990	
Clarke	SR 608 (Parshall Road / Wickliffe Road)	Webbtown	SR 621 to West Virginia state line near Wickliffe	May 17, 1990	
Clarke	SR 612 (Shepherds Mill Road)		SR 608 to US 340 near Gaylord	May 17, 1990	part of former SR 276
Botetourt / Craig / Giles	SR 42 (Blue Grass Trail / Cumberland Gap Road) / SR 615 (Craig Creek Road) / SR 43 (Narrow Passage Road / Parkway Drive)	Buchanan, Eagle Rock, New Castle	US 460 near Newport to Blue Ridge Parkway at Bearwallow Gap	December 20, 1990	
Alleghany / Craig / Roanoke	SR 311 (Catawba Valley Drive / Paint Bank Road / Kanawha Trail)	Catawba, Crows, New Castle, Paint Bank	SR 419 at Hanging Rock to WV 311 near White Sulphur Springs, WV	December 20, 1990	
Alleghany	SR 159 (Dunlap Creek Road)		SR 311 at Crows to I-64 / US 60 near Callaghan	December 20, 1990	
Alleghany / Botetourt	SR 621 (Roaring Run Road) / SR 616 (Rich Patch Road)	Rich Patch	SR 615 at Strom to SR 696 in Low Moor	December 20, 1990	
Northumberland	SR 679 (Crosshills Road)		SR 200 near Wicomico Church to SR 200 at Carlson Store	March 20, 1991	former alignment of SR 200
Northumberland	SR 605 (Balls Neck Road)	Ball's Neck	SR 200 near Mount Olive to Hughlett Point Natural Area Preserve	March 20, 1991	
Northumberland	SR 669 (Waddeys Road / Apple Grove Road / Prentice Creek Road / Bluff Point Road)	Bluff Point Neck	SR 605 at Waddeys to dead end beyond Byrdton	March 20, 1991	
Lancaster / Northumberland	SR 607 (Ditchley Road)		SR 200 near Good Luck to Ditchley	March 20, 1991	
Northumberland	SR 608 (Bluff Point Road / Jarvis Point Road)	Bluff Point Neck	SR 200 near Kilmarnock to dead end near Chesapeake Bay	March 20, 1991	
Tazewell	SR 667 (Medley Valley Road) / SR 727 (West End Road)	Burkes Garden	SR 623 to SR 623 in Burkes Garden	February 20, 1992	
Tazewell	SR 625 (Banks Ridge Road) / SR 666 (Gose Mill Road)	Burkes Garden	SR 623 in Burkes Garden to SR 623 at Gose Mill	February 20, 1992	
Northumberland	SR 636 / SR 694 (Avalon Lane) / SR 604 (Sydnors Millpond Road) / SR 640 (Hull Neck Road) / SR 646 (Folly Road) / SR 645 (Gonyon Road) / SR 644 (Hacks Neck Road / Ferry Road / Sunny Bank Road / Blackberry Road)	Sunny Bank Ferry	US 360 near Avalon to SR 657 in Reedville	March 3, 1992	runs as close to the Potomac River as possible without retracing
Northumberland	SR 643 (Vir-Mar Beach Road)		SR 644 to Vir-Mar Beach	March 3, 1992	
Northumberland	SR 649 (Flood Point Road)		SR 644 near Ophelia to dead end near Little Wicomico River	March 3, 1992	
Northumberland	SR 657 (Fleeton Road) / US 360 (Main Street)		dead end at Fleeton to SR 644 in Reedville	March 3, 1992	
Clarke	SR 622 (Bordens Spring Road / Swift Shoals Road)		SR 658 at Stone Bridge to US 50 near Berrys	June 18, 1992	
Bland / Wythe	US 52 (Scenic Highway / Stony Fork Road) / SR 717 (Krenning Road)		I-77 near Bland to I-77 near Carnot	September 17, 1992	
Bland	SR 617 (Waddletown Road)		US 52 near Bland to US 52 near Effna	September 17, 1992	
Bedford / Campbell	SR 43 (Bedford Highway / Leesville Road / Glenwood Drive / Virginia Byway / Peaks Road)	Bedford	SR 43 near Altavista to Blue Ridge Parkway at Peaks of Otter	December 17, 1992	
Lee / Russell / Tazewell / Wise	Trail of the Lonesome Pine: US 19 / SR 71 / US 58 Alt. / SR 70 / US 23 / SR 160		West Virginia state line in Bluefield to Tennessee state line near Blackwater; Norton to Kentucky state line at Pound Gap; Appalachia to Kentucky state line at Black Mountain	March 8, 1993	follows business routes in Tazewell, Lebanon, Norton-Big Stone Gap, Wise, Pound
Lee / Scott	Daniel Boone Heritage Trail: US 23 / US 58		Tennessee state line near Weber City to Tennessee state line at Cumberland Gap	March 8, 1993	
Northampton	SR 600 (Seaside Road) / SR 603 (Willis Wharf Road)	Nassawadox	US 13 at Kiptopeke to US 13 Bus. in Exmore	February 17, 1994	
Fairfax	SR 645 (Clifton Road)	Clifton	Virginia State Route 620 (Braddock Road) near Centreville to SR 123 (Ox Road) at Donovans Corner	April 20, 1994	
Rockbridge	SR 663 (River Road)		US 501 near Buena Vista to US 501 near Glasgow	June 23, 1994	parallels the Maury River
Scott / Wise	SR 72 (Dungannon Road / Hanging Rock Parkway)	Hanging Rock	Coeburn to Dungannon	March 9, 1995	
Amelia / Appomattox / Buckingham / Cumberland / Dinwiddie / Prince Edward	Lee's Retreat	Appomattox Campaign battlefields	SR 613 at Five Forks to US 460 in Appomattox	March 20, 1995	roughly traces the path taken by Robert E. Lee's Army of Northern Virginia on April 1–9, 1865, from its defeat in the Battle of Five Forks to its surrender at the Battle of Appomattox Court House
Prince William	SR 646 (Aden Road)		SR 619 (Joplin Road) at Independent Hill to SR 28 (Nokesville Road)	July 11, 2017	
Russell	SR 640 (River Road / Reeds Valley Road / Middle Valley Road / Long Hollow Road / River Mountain Road / Clifton Farm Road)		St. Paul to SR 770 near Wardell	March 5, 1996	part of the Heart of Appalachia Bike Route
Fauquier	SR 688 (Leeds Manor Road)		US 17 near Paris to US 211 near Waterloo	September 19, 1996	
Fauquier	SR 55 (John Marshall Highway) / SR F185 (Grove Lane)		Thoroughfare Gap to Linden	September 19, 1996	
Fauquier	SR 712 (Delaplane Grade Road) / SR 623 (Rokeby Road)		US 50 at Upperville to US 17 at Delaplane	September 19, 1996	
Fauquier	SR 710 (Rectortown Road)		SR 712 at Kerfoot to U.S. Route 17 Business / SR 55 in Marshall	September 19, 1996	
Fauquier	SR 713 (Atoka Road)		US 50 at Atoka to SR 710 near Rectortown	September 19, 1996	
Fauquier / Loudoun	SR 709 (Zulla Road)		US 50 near Middleburg to SR 55 at Brookes Corner	September 19, 1996	
Fauquier	SR 702 (Frogtown Road / Rock Hill Mill Road)		SR 710 near Rectortown to SR 709 near Zulla	September 19, 1996	
Fauquier	SR 628 (Blantyre Road)		SR 55 near Broad Run to US 17 at Bethel	September 19, 1996	
Fauquier	SR 691 (Carters Run Road / Wilson Road / Old Waterloo Road)		US 17 near Marshall to SR 688 near Waterloo	September 19, 1996	
Fauquier	SR 647 (Crest Hill Road)		SR 721 near Marshall to SR 688 at Jerrys Shop	September 19, 1996	
Fauquier	SR 635 (Hume Road)		SR 688 at Hume to SR 647 near Ada	September 19, 1996	
Fauquier	SR 733 / SR 738 / SR 689 (Wilson Road)		SR 647 near Vernon Mills to SR 691 near Dudie	September 19, 1996	
Fauquier	SR 678 (Old Waterloo Road)		SR 691 near Waterloo to US 211 in Warrenton	September 19, 1996	
Fauquier	SR 670 (Old Auburn Road) / SR 667 (Old Dumfries Road) / SR 806 (Elk Run Road)	Catlett	SR 643 near Warrenton to US 17 at Morrisville	September 19, 1996	
Fauquier	SR 602 (Rogues Road) / SR 616 (Casanova Road / Bristersburg Road)		SR 670 at Auburn to SR 806 at Bristersburg	September 19, 1996	
Fauquier	SR 651 (Sumerduck Road / Freemans Ford Road) / SR 660 (St. Pauls Road) / SR 661 (Botha Road) / SR 651 (Lees Mill Road) / SR 687 (Opal Road)	Remington	US 17 near Goldvein to SR 802 at Fauquier White Sulphur Springs	September 19, 1996	parallels the Rappahannock River
Alleghany / Bath	SR 629 (Douthat State Park Road)	Douthat State Park	I-64 / US 60 / US 60 Bus. at Cliftondale Park to SR 39 near Bath Alum	March 2, 1997	
Fairfax	SR 612 (Yates Ford Road)		SR 645 (Clifton Road) near Clifton to SR 641 (Chapel Road) near Butts Corner	March 3, 1997	
King George	SR 218 (Caledon Road / Windsor Drive / Tetotum Road)		SR 605 near Passapatanzy to SR 206 at Berthaville; US 301 near Owens to SR 205 near Tetotum	March 20, 1997	
Shenandoah / Warren	SR 55 (John Marshall Highway / Strasburg Road)		Frederick County line at Star Tannery to Strasburg; Strasburg to Front Royal; Front Royal to Fauquier County line at Linden	June 12, 1997	
Rockbridge	US 11 (Lee Highway)		Lexington to SR 130 at Natural Bridge	December 18, 1997	
Augusta / Rockbridge	SR 56 (Tye River Turnpike)		Blue Ridge Parkway at Tye River Gap to US 11 at Steeles Tavern	December 18, 1997	part of U.S. Bike Route 76
James City	SR 614 (Centerville Road / Greensprings Road) / SR 359 (Jamestown Festival Parkway)		SR 5000 near Green Spring Plantation to Colonial Parkway near Jamestown	December 18, 1997	
Spotsylvania	SR 618 (River Road)		SR 3 at Chancellorsville to SR 639 near Fredericksburg	December 18, 1997	
Lancaster	SR 354 (River Road) / SR 604 (Ottoman Ferry Road / Merry Point Road) / SR 3 (Mary Ball Road) / SR 200 (Irvington Road / Jesse Dupont Memorial Highway)	Kilmarnock, Merry Point Ferry, White Stone	SR 3 near Litwalton to Northumberland County line near Rehoboth Church	April 16, 1998	loops through White Stone and crosses itself in Kilmarnock
Franklin	SR 602 (Callaway Road / Ferrum Mountain Road) / SR 623 (Ingramville Road / Fair Stone Park Road)	Callaway, Ferrum	Roanoke County line at Adney Gap to Patrick County line near Fairy Stone State Park	November 19, 1998	
Floyd / Franklin	SR 640 (Franklin Pike / Five Mile Mountain Road / Rock Ridge Road / Six Mile Post Road)		Blue Ridge Parkway near Fivemile Mountain to SR 40 near Rocky Mount	November 19, 1998	
Franklin	SR 748 (Turners Creek Road)		SR 640 near Fivemile Mountain to SR 40 near Ferrum	November 19, 1998	
Fairfax	SR 659 (Union Mill Road)		SR 658 (Compton Road) near Clifton to SR 620 (Braddock Road) near Centreville	March 25, 1999	
Culpeper / Orange	SR 615 (Rapidan Road)		SR 20 Bus. in Orange to SR 614 at Rapidan	September 15, 1999	
Loudoun	SR 673 / SR 681 (Milltown Road)		SR 287 in Lovettsville to SR 698 near Waterford	September 15, 1999	
Loudoun	SR 722 (Lincoln Road) / SR 728 (North Fork Road) / SR 731 (Watermill Road)		Purcellville to SR 734 near Mountville	September 15, 1999	
Smyth / Tazewell	SR 16 (Sugar Grove Highway / Park Boulevard / B.F. Buchanan Highway) / US 19 Bus. / US 460 Bus. (Crab Orchard Road)	Hungry Mother State Park, Marion	SR 650 at Dickey Gap to US 19 / US 460 at Pisgah	January 20, 2000	
Fairfax	SR 743 (Colvin Run Road)		SR 7 to SR 7 through Colvin Run	March 9, 2000	former alignment of SR 7
Mathews	SR 600 (Circle Drive) / SR 14 (New Point Comfort Highway) / SR 198 / SR 642 (Buckley Hall Road) / SR 643 (Haven Beach Road) / SR 613 (Knights Woods Road) / SR 611 (Garden Creek Road) / SR 609 (Bethel Beach Road) / SR 608 (Hamburg Road)	Mathews	SR 14 at Bavon to SR 14 at Port Haywood	April 20, 2000	loop from Bavon through Port Haywood to Mathews and back around to Port Haywood
Mathews	SR 617 (North River Road) / SR 660 / SR 685 (East River Road)		SR 14 at North to Mobjack	April 20, 2000	
Mathews	SR 618 (Cardinal Road)		SR 617 to SR 660 near Cardinal	April 20, 2000	
Culpeper / Rappahannock	US 522 (Sperryville Pike / Lee Highway / Zachary Taylor Highway)		US 15 Bus. in Culpeper to SR 635 near Chester Gap	April 20, 2000	
Washington	SR 91 (Monroe Road / Mountain City Road)		I-81 near Old Glade Spring to Tennessee state line near Damascus	September 21, 2000	
Grayson / Smyth / Washington	US 58 (J.E.B. Stuart Highway) / SR 603 (Konnarock Road / Laurel Valley Road / Fairwood Road)		SR 91 at Laureldale to SR 16 in Troutdale	September 21, 2000	part of U.S. Bike Route 76
Grayson / Smyth	SR 600 (Whitetop Road / Green Cove Road)	Elk Garden, Whitetop Mountain	SR 603 near Konnarock to North Carolina state line near Nella, NC	September 21, 2000	
Loudoun	SR 7 Bus. (Colonial Highway) / SR 699 (Dry Mill Road) / SR 7 Bus. (Loudoun Street)	Clarks Gap	SR 704 in Hamilton to US 15 Bus. in Leesburg	November 16, 2000	
Fairfax	SR 643 (Henderson Road)		SR 645 (Clifton Road) near Clifton to SR 123 (Ox Road) near Burke Lake	March 13, 2001	
Shenandoah	US 11 (Old Valley Pike)		US 211 in New Market to SR 55 in Strasburg	June 21, 2001	
Shenandoah	SR 675 (Camp Roosevelt Road / Edinburg Gap Road / Stoney Creek Road / Wolf Gap Road) / SR 717 (Liberty Furnace Road / Alum Springs Road)	Columbia Furnace, Edinburg, Edinburg Gap	SR 730 near Camp Roosevelt Recreation Area to SR 263 at Basye	June 21, 2001	
Shenandoah	SR 263 (Orkney Grade)	Basye	Orkney Springs to US 11 in Mount Jackson	June 21, 2001	
Shenandoah	SR 623 (Back Road) / SR 42 (Senedo Road) / SR 767 (Quicksburg Road)	Columbia Furnace, Forestville	SR 55 near Lebanon Church to US 11 near Quicksburg	June 21, 2001	
Shenandoah	SR 614 (Middle Road)		SR 42 / SR 767 at Forestville to US 11 at Bowmans Crossing	June 21, 2001	
Frederick / Shenandoah	SR 600 (Saumsville Road / Zepp Road / Oates Road) / SR 604 (Star Tannery Road)	Fetzer Gap, Saumsville	US 11 near Maurertown to SR 55 at Star Tannery	June 21, 2001	
Fauquier	US 17 (Winchester Road)		US 50 at Paris to I-66 near Delaplane	September 20, 2001	
Rockbridge	SR 252 (Brownsburg Turnpike) / SR 606 (Raphine Road)		SR 39 at Cedar Grove to US 11 at Steeles Tavern	September 20, 2001	part of U.S. Bike Route 76
	Blue Ridge Parkway / Skyline Drive		North Carolina state line near Lowgap, NC, to US 340 near Front Royal	March 4, 2002	also a National Scenic Byway (designated September 2005)
	George Washington Memorial Parkway		Mount Vernon to I-495 near McLean	March 4, 2002	also a National Scenic Byway (designated September 2005)
	Colonial Parkway	Colonial Williamsburg	Historic Jamestowne to Yorktown Battlefield Visitor Center	March 4, 2002	also a National Scenic Byway (designated September 2005); part of U.S. Bike Route 76
Caroline / Spotsylvania	SR 606 (Stonewall Jackson Road) / SR 607 (Guinea Station Road)	Stonewall Jackson Death Site	SR 2 at Locks Corner to US 1 near Massaponax	March 21, 2002	
Wythe	US 52 (Fort Chiswell Road) / SR 121 (Max Meadows Road) / SR 610 (Peppers Ferry Road)	Max Meadows	Carroll County line near Poplar Camp to Wytheville	March 21, 2002	
Wythe	SR 619 (Austinville Road / Huddle Road / Gleaves Road / Saint Peters Road) / SR 749 (Cedar Springs Road) / SR 90 / SR 680 (Black Lick Road)	Rural Retreat, Speedwell	US 52 near Laswell to US 52 at Favonia	March 21, 2002	
Loudoun	SR 9 (Charles Town Pike)		SR 7 at Clarks Gap to West Virginia state line at Keys Gap	March 21, 2002	
Loudoun	SR 671 (Harpers Ferry Road)		SR 9 at Mechanicsville to US 340 near Loudoun Heights	March 21, 2002	former SR 275
King and Queen	SR 14 (The Trail)		SR 33 at Shacklefords to US 360 at St. Stephens Church	March 21, 2002	
Fairfax	SR 674 (Hunter Mill Road)		SR 123 (Chain Bridge Road) at Oakton to SR 606 (Baron Cameron Avenue) at Browns Chapel	March 22, 2002	
Caroline / King and Queen	SR 721 (Newtown Road / Sparta Road)		US 360 at St. Stephens Church to US 301 / SR 2 near DeJarnette	June 20, 2002	former extension of SR 14
Westmoreland	SR 3 (Kings Highway) / SR 622 (Panorama Road / Currioman Road)	Montross	SR 205 at Oak Grove to Currioman Landing	August 15, 2002	
Westmoreland	SR 204 (Popes Creek Road)		SR 3 at Wakefield Corner to George Washington Birthplace National Monument	August 15, 2002	
Westmoreland	SR 347 (State Park Road)		SR 3 at Baynesville to Westmoreland State Park	August 15, 2002	
Westmoreland	SR 214 / SR 609 (Stratford Hall Road)	Stratford Hall	SR 3 at Lerty to SR 622 near Chisford	August 15, 2002	
City of Virginia Beach	Green Sea Byway: Sandpiper Road / Sandbridge Road (former SR 629) / New Bridge Road (former SR 625) / Indian River Road (former SR 603) / Muddy Creek Road (former SR 603) / Nanneys Creek Road (former SR 603) / Mill Landing Road (former SR 622) / Morris Neck Road (former SR 621)	Sandbridge Beach	Back Bay National Wildlife Refuge to Princess Anne Road at Creeds	January 16, 2003	semicircle around Back Bay
City of Virginia Beach	Green Sea Byway: Princess Anne Road (former SR 615) / Pungo Ferry Road (former SR 726) / Blackwater Road (former SR 608)		North Carolina state line near Munden to North Carolina state line near Vine	January 16, 2003	
Fairfax	SR 611 / SR 825 (Old Colchester Road)		US 1 at Pohick to Occoquan River at Colchester	March 16, 2003	
New Kent	SR 249 (New Kent Highway) / SR 609 (Old Church Road / Talleysville Road)	New Kent, Talleysville	SR 33 at Angelview Church to SR 608 near White House	May 15, 2003	
New Kent	SR 608 (Old River Road) / SR 606 (Old Church Road)	Tunstall Station	SR 155 / SR 249 at Carps Corner to SR 609 near Talleysville	May 15, 2003	
Louisa	SR 613 (Poindexter Road / Oakland Road / Goldmine Road / Mansfield Road)	Green Springs Historic District	US 250 near Zion Crossroads to US 522 / SR 208 at Wares Crossroads	March 18, 2004	
Fairfax	SR 660 (Fairfax Station Road)		SR 612 (Colchester Road) near Clifton to SR 123 (Ox Road) at Fairfax Station	April 12, 2004	
Fairfax	SR 609 (Pleasant Valley Road)		US 29 (Lee Highway) at Bull Run to SR 8526 (Blue Spring Drive) near Pleasant Valley	April 12, 2004	
Caroline / Essex	US 17 (Tidewater Trail)		Tappahannock to Spotsylvania County line near New Post	April 12, 2004	parallels the Rappahannock River
Lancaster	SR 614 (Devils Bottom Road)		SR 3 near Brook Vale to SR 604 near Merry Point	April 15, 2004	
Brunswick	SR 903 (Hendricks Mill Road) / SR 626 (Robinson Ferry Road / Gasburg Road)		Mecklenburg County line near Joyceville to SR 46 at Bowens Corner	June 17, 2004	
Clarke / Loudoun	SR 601 (Blue Ridge Mountain Road)	Mount Weather Emergency Operations Center	SR 7 at Snickers Gap to US 17 / US 50 at Ashby Gap	July 15, 2004	runs atop the Blue Ridge
Frederick	SR 661 (Redbud Road)		US 11 near Winchester to SR 660 near Burnt Factory	September 16, 2004	
Brunswick	SR 46 (Christanna Highway)	Lawrenceville	North Carolina state line near Bowens Corner to Nottoway County line near Fort Barfoot	November 18, 2004	
Clarke	SR 638 (Howellsville Road)		US 17 / US 50 at Berrys to Warren County line near Howellsville	January 20, 2005	parallels the Shenandoah River
Clarke	SR 606 (River Road) / SR 649 (Frogtown Road) / SR 606 (Mount Carmel Road)	Frogtown	SR 7 at Castlemans Ferry to US 17 / US 50 near Berrys	January 20, 2005	
Clarke	SR 658 (White Post Road / Sugar Hill Road)		US 340 near White Post to Warren County line near Stone Bridge	January 20, 2005	
Patrick	US 58 / US 58 Bus. (J.E.B. Stuart Highway)		SR 8 north of Stuart to Blue Ridge Parkway at Meadows of Dan	May 19, 2005	
Page	SR 675 (Bixlers Ferry Road / Fort Valley Road)		US 340 Bus. in Luray to Shenandoah County line near Camp Roosevelt Recreation Area	May 19, 2005	
Page	SR 615 (Egypt Bend Road / Longs Road)		SR 675 northwest of Luray to US 211 / US 340 west of Salem	May 19, 2005	parallels the Shenandoah River
Nelson	SR 664 (Beech Grove Road)	Beech Grove	SR 151 near Wintergreen to Blue Ridge Parkway at Reeds Gap	May 19, 2005	
Appomattox / Charlotte / Mecklenburg / Prince Edward	SR 47 (Thomas Jefferson Highway / Craftons Gate Highway)	Charlotte Court House, Chase City, Drakes Branch	US 460 Bus. in Pamplin City to US 1 in South Hill	January 18, 2006	
Warren	US 340 (Stonewall Jackson Highway)		Skyline Drive near Front Royal to Page County line at Overall	February 15, 2006	parallels the South Fork Shenandoah River
Mecklenburg	SR 903 (Goodes Ferry Road)		US 58 in South Hill to Brunswick County line near Joyceville	May 17, 2006	
Campbell / Charlotte	SR 40 (Patrick Henry Highway / Wickliffe Avenue) / SR 600 (Mount Calvary Road) / SR 619 (Patrick Henry Road)	Phenix	SR 47 in Charlotte Court House to SR 677 near Patrick Henry National Memorial	July 20, 2006	
Charlotte	SR 637 (Saxkey Road) / SR 612 (Hermon Road) / SR 641 (Mulberry Hill Road) / SR 607 (River Road)		SR 47 / SR 59 in Drakes Branch to SR 746 near Randolph	July 20, 2006	
Halifax	SR 344 (Macdonald Road / Scottsburg Road) / SR 360 (Bethel Road / Mountain Road)	Halifax, Scottsburg	Staunton River State Park to Pittsylvania County line near Ingram	July 20, 2006	
Buchanan / Dickenson / Lee / Russell / Scott / Tazewell / Wise	Virginia Coal Heritage Trail: 324.62 miles (522.43 km) of road in southwestern Virginia		Pocahontas to St. Paul	March 19, 2007	
Culpeper / Fauquier / Loudoun / Madison / Orange / Prince William	US 15 (James Monroe Highway / James Madison Highway / Lee Highway)		US 50 at Gilberts Corner to SR 20 in Orange	May 17, 2007	part of the Journey Through Hallowed Ground National Scenic Byway (designated October 16, 2009); follows business routes in Warrenton, Remington, and Culpeper
Fairfax	SR 5590 (Newman Road)		SR 645 (Clifton Road) in Clifton to SR 612 (Colchester Road)	March 7, 2008	
Page	US 340 / SR 616 (Leaksville Road) / SR 636 (Wampler Drive) / SR 650 (River Road / Grove Hill River Road) / US 340	Luray	Warren County line at Overall to Rockingham County line at Verbena	April 17, 2008	
Page	US 211 (Lee Highway)	Luray	Rappahannock County line at New Market Gap to Shenandoah County line at Thornton Gap	April 17, 2008	
Albemarle / City of Charlottesville	SR 20		US 250 east of Charlottesville to I-64 south of Charlottesville	November 20, 2008	part of the Journey Through Hallowed Ground National Scenic Byway (designated October 16, 2009); this addition filled the gap through Charlottesville
Albemarle	SR 53 (Thomas Jefferson Parkway)	Monticello	Fluvanna County line near Lake Monticello to SR 20 near Charlottesville	November 20, 2008	part of the Journey Through Hallowed Ground National Scenic Byway (designated October 16, 2009) west of SR 729
Albemarle	SR 729 (Milton Road) / US 250 (Richmond Road)		SR 53 near Milton to SR 22 at Shadwell	November 20, 2008	part of the Journey Through Hallowed Ground National Scenic Byway (designated October 16, 2009)
Fairfax	SR 654 (Popes Head Road)		SR 645 (Clifton Road) near Clifton to SR 123 (Ox Road) near Fairfax Station	February 25, 2009	
Loudoun	SR 751 (Cider Mill Road)		SR 9 to SR 719 near Hillsboro	May 21, 2009	
Rappahannock	SR 729 (Ben Venue Road)		US 522 at Flint Hill to US 211 at Ben Venue	July 16, 2009	part of former SR 242
Dickenson	SR 631 (Brush Creek Road) / SR 611 (South of the Mountain Road / Blowing Rock Road / Bartlick Road)	Bartlick, Blowing Rock, Isom	SR 83 in Clintwood to SR 80 near Haysi	November 19, 2009	
Craig / Giles	SR 635 (Big Stony Creek Road) / SR 600 (Waiteville Road)		US 460 near Pembroke to SR 311 in Paint Bank	September 15, 2010	Whistle Stop Byway; mostly follows the former Big Stony Railway (Norfolk and Western Railway); connected through Monroe County, West Virginia by CR 17
Fairfax	SR 658 (Compton Road)		SR 621 (Bull Run Post Office Road) near Bull Run to SR 645 (Clifton Road) near Clifton	March 15, 2011	
Albemarle / Nelson	SR 617 (Rockfish River Road) / SR 800 (Schuyler Road)		US 29 / SR 6 near Woods Mill to SR 6 near Schuyler	April 20, 2011	
Bedford / Campbell	SR 24 (Colonial Highway / Wyatts Way)	Caryswood, Evington, Flat Creek Rural Historic District	US 29 at Yellow Branch to SR 43 at Gillespie	October 17, 2012	
Rappahannock	SR 729 (Richmond Road)	Meadow Grove Farm	US 211 at Ben Venue to SR 618 at Newbys Crossroads	February 19, 2014	part of former SR 242
Prince Edward	SR 696 (Green Bay Road)		US 360 at Green Bay to US 460 near Farmville		former SR 135
Accomack / Northampton	SR 600 (Seaside Road)		SR 603 near Exmore to SR 182 at Mappsburg		
Accomack	SR 180 (Pungoteague Road / Wachapreague Road) / SR 605 (Drummondtown Road / Seaside Road) / US 13 Bus. (Tasley Road) / SR 126 (Fairgrounds Road) / SR 179 (Market Street)	Keller, Wachapreague	SR 178 at Pungoteague to SR 1023 in Onancock		
