= Isom =

Isom may refer to:

== Places ==
- Isom, Kentucky, an unincorporated community in Letcher County
- Isom, Virginia, an unincorporated community in Dickenson County
- Isom, West Virginia, an unincorporated community in Logan County
- Lake Isom, a lake in Lake County, Tennessee

== People ==
- Isom (surname)
- Isom Dart (1849-1900), American rodeo clown and stunt rider, rancher, and horse and cattle rustler

== Other ==
- Isom, a comic book by Cliff Richards and Eric July
- ISO base media file format
- USS William Isom (ID-1555), a United States Navy tanker
