= Blowing Rock =

Blowing Rock may refer to:

- The town of Blowing Rock, North Carolina
  - The rocky outcropping Blowing Rock (land feature), near the town of the same name
- Blowing Rock, Virginia, an unincorporated community
- Caribbean island belonging to Anguilla

== See also ==
- Blowing Rocks Preserve, Florida
