= Isom (surname) =

Isom is a surname and occasionally a given name. Notable people with the name include:

- Anne Williams-Isom (born 1967), American government official, academic, lawyer, and nonprofit executive
- Cedric Isom (born 1984), American-Rwandan basketball player
- Daniel Isom (born 1967), American academic and police officer
- Harriet Winsar Isom (born 1936), American foreign service officer
- Lori L. Isom, American pharmacologist
- Mary Frances Isom (1865–1920), American librarian
- Mike Isom (born 1948), American football coach
- Mo Isom (born 1989), American soccer player
- Ray Isom (born 1965), American football player
- Rickey Isom (born 1963), American football player
- Sarah McGehee Isom (1854–1905), American orator
