= Virginia State Route 645 (Fairfax County) =

State highway in Virginia, United States

State Route 645

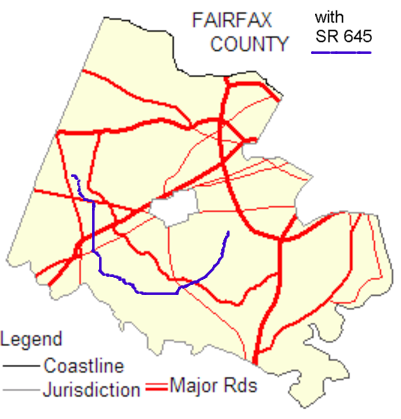

Route information
- Maintained by VDOT
- Length: 20.38 mi (32.80 km)
- Existed: 1948–present
- Tourist routes: Virginia Byway

Major junctions
- West end: Cul-de-sac on Wall Road in Oak Hill
- US 50 near Chantilly SR 7700 near Fair Lakes; I-66 near Fairfax/Centreville; US 29 near Fairfax/Centreville/Clifton; SR 123 near Fairfax Station SR 286 near Fairfax Station
- East end: SR 620 in Springfield

Location
- Country: United States
- State: Virginia

Highway system
- Virginia Routes; Interstate; US; Primary; Secondary; Byways; History; HOT lanes

State Route 645 in Fairfax County, Virginia is a secondary state highway. There are six portions, three of them being major, named Wall Road, Lees Corner Road, Stringfellow Road, Clifton Road, Main Street (in the Town of Clifton) and Burke Lake Road. There are also numerous overlaps (mostly unposted): some include SR 657 / Centreville Road, U.S. Route 50, SR 652 (Burke Rd), SR 612 (Yates Ford Rd/Henderson Rd), and SR 641. A concurrency used to exist at US 29 near Centreville until the 1990s.

== Route description ==
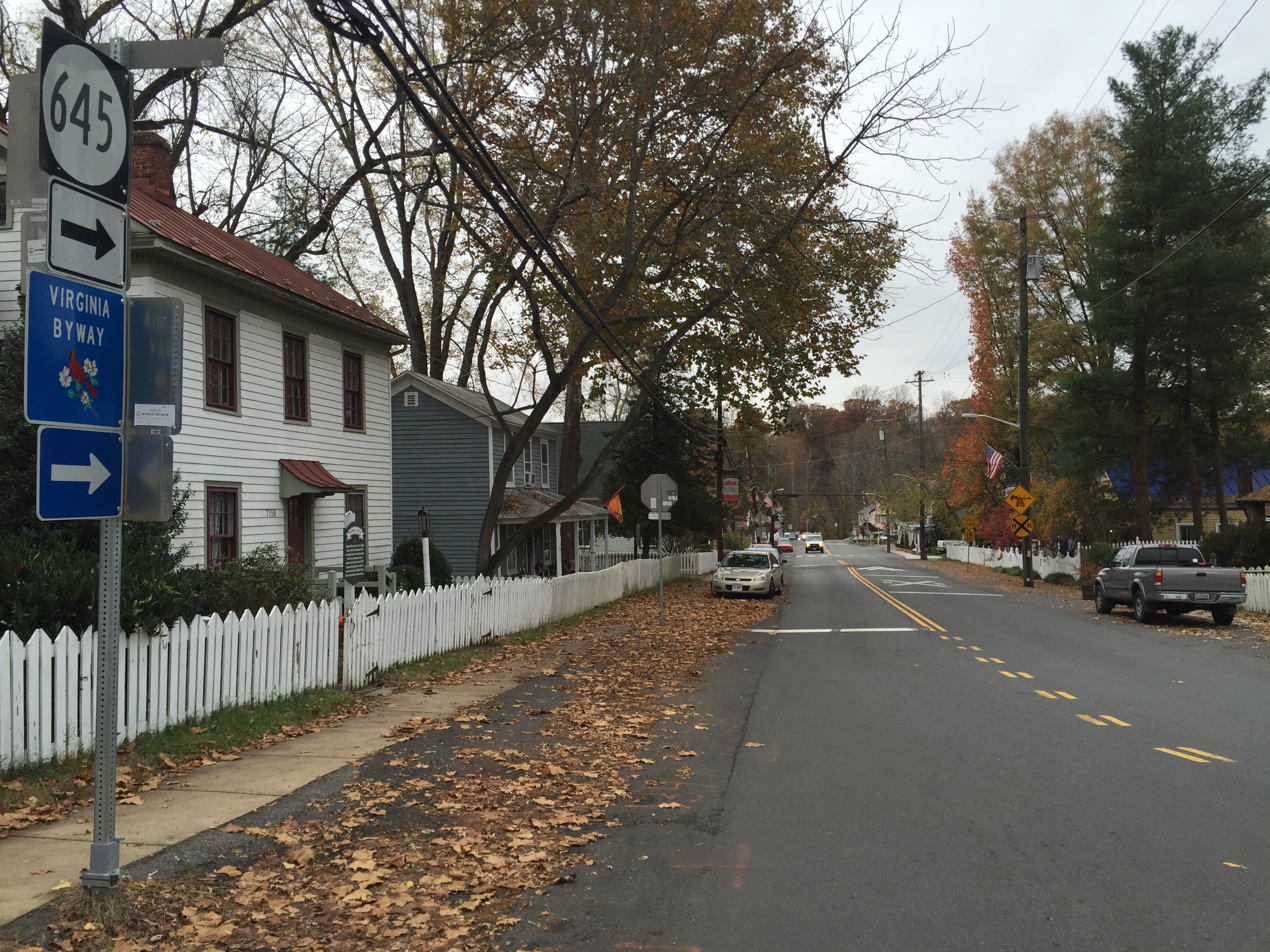
View northwest along SR 645 (Main Street) in Clifton

A map of Fairfax County shows that SR 645 is somewhat circuitous: Wall Road is east–west, Lees Corner Road, Stringfellow Road, and the northern part of Clifton Road are north–south, the rest of Clifton Road is mostly east–west, and Burke Lake Road is northeast–southwest.

=== Wall Road ===
SR 645 starts in Oak Hill at a cul-de-sac between SR 28 (Sully Road) and SR 657 (Centreville Road). It goes one block and terminates at SR 657.

=== Lees Corner Road ===
At this point SR 645 turns south and is concurrent with SR 657, Centreville Road. SR 645 then turns southeast along Lees Corner Road in Herndon. It terminates at U.S. Route 50, Lee Jackson Memorial Highway, in Chantilly.

=== Stringfellow Road ===
At this point SR 645 turns east and is concurrent with US 50. SR 645 then turns south in Fairfax. Once south of U.S. 50, Stringfellow Road serves as the ZIP Code border between Chantilly (20151) and Fairfax (22033). The road passes through the Greenbriar development, where it intersects with SR 4831, Poplar Tree Road. It then passes by Fair Lakes' western end where the Fair Lakes Parkway terminates at SR 645. After this, Stringfellow Road passes east of the Stringfellow Road Park & Ride, a park and ride facility, and has an interchange with Interstate 66. From 5:30 to 9:30 a.m. weekdays, HOV-2 traffic is allowed to enter I-66 eastbound from Stringfellow Rd. Westbound traffic can exit onto Stringfellow Road at all other times, but the exit is restricted to HOV-2+ traffic weekdays from 3:00 to 7:00 p.m. South of the I-66 interchange, Stringfellow Road heads to an intersection with U.S. Route 29 (Lee Highway) at the Fairfax/Centreville/Clifton border.

A project was completed to widen Stringfellow Road from SR 7735 (Fair Lakes Boulevard) to US 50 from two lanes to four (Stringfellow Road from Interstate 66 to US 29 was widened to four lanes in the 1990s). The rationale for this project was that VDOT saw that Stringfellow Road was a major connector between US 29 and US 50, and was a very congested road.

The project included:

- Five- to six-foot-wide (1.5 to 1.8 m) sidewalk on the west side of the road
- Ten-foot-wide (3.0 m) shared-use path on the east side
- Wide curb lanes in order to accommodate bicyclists

Stringfellow Road is named after Confederate spy Benjamin Franklin Stringfellow.

=== Clifton Road (north of Clifton) ===
After crossing U.S. 29, SR 645 becomes Clifton Road and has entered the Clifton ZIP code (20124). The road remains four lanes and the speed limit remains 45 MPH. After about half a mile the road intersects with SR 620, Braddock Road. After crossing SR 620 Clifton Road reduces from four to two lanes, although the speed limit remains 45 MPH. After passing by the Twin Lakes Golf Course, the road intersects with SR 654, Popes Head Road, and enters a rather equestrian area for about 3 miles (4.8 km) before reaching the Clifton corporate limits. During that approach the speed limit is gradually reduced to 25 MPH before intersecting with Newman Road. The road then turns and enters the town. This portion of SR 645 has been designated a Virginia Byway.

=== Main Street (town of Clifton only) ===
In the town SR 645 intersects with Chapel and Kincheloe roads before it leaves the town (one must turn left to stay on SR 645). Also in the town SR 645 crosses the Southern Railway (US) tracks. Infrequently SR 645 is impassable due to flooding from Pope's Head Creek.

=== Clifton Road (east of Clifton) ===
Once past the town's corporate limits, the speed limit increases to 35 MPH. It then intersects with SR 643 / SR 612 (Henderson Road) which draws heavy traffic because it leads to the only crossing between Fairfax County and Prince William County that is not physically located at or near Woodbridge or Manassas. Crossing into Fairfax Station, Clifton Road then intersects with SR 610 (Wolf Run Shoals Road). After the intersection the road heads east, and then intersects with SR 123. This portion of SR 645 has been designated a Virginia Byway.

=== Burke Lake Road ===
After crossing SR 123, SR 645 continues with two lanes, but the speed limit increases to 40 MPH. The road forms the northwestern boundary of Burke Lake Park. It then intersects with the Fairfax County Parkway (SR 286). SR 645 continues and widens from a two lane undivided road to a four lane divided highway, although the speed limit remains 40 MPH. It intersects with SR 643 (that road is called Burke Centre Parkway to the west, and Lee Chapel Rd. to the east). SR 645 leaves Fairfax Station and enters Burke. It intersects with SR 652 (Burke Rd.) (this is a split intersection because it is near the bridge over the Southern Railway tracks) where the speed limit decreases to 35 MPH. It passes by Lake Braddock Secondary School and then leaves Burke when it intersects with SR 638 (Rolling Road), and crosses into Springfield. SR 645 ends at SR 620 (Braddock Road) on the Springfield / Annandale border.

== Major intersections ==
The entire route is in Fairfax County.

Location	mi	km	Destinations	Notes
Herndon	0.00	0.00	Cul-de-sac – Herndon	Northwest terminus of SR 645
Herndon	0.69	1.11	SR 657 (Centreville Road) – Herndon, Chantilly	Western end SR 657 concurrency
Herndon	1.01	1.63	SR 657 (Centreville Road) – Herndon, Chantilly	Eastern end of SR 657 concurrency
Chantilly	2.74	4.41	US 50 (Lee Jackson Memorial Highway) – Fairfax, Winchester	Western end of US 50 concurrency
Fairfax	3.24	5.21	US 50 (Lee Jackson Memorial Highway) – Fairfax, Winchester	Eastern end of US 50 concurrency
Fairfax–Centreville line	5.22	8.40	SR 7700 (Fair Lakes Parkway) – Fair Lakes	Western terminus of main Fair Lakes highway
Fairfax–Centreville line	5.69	9.16	I-66 – Washington, DC	Eastbound left entrance open only to HOV-2+ traffic weekdays from 5:30 to 9:30 a.m. Westbound left exit open all other times; exit restricted to HOV-2+ traffic weekdays from 3:00 to 7:00 p.m.; exit 54 on I-66
Fairfax–Centreville– Clifton tripoint	6.38	10.27	US 29 (Lee Highway) – Fairfax, Gainesville	
Clifton	7.11	11.44	SR 620 (Braddock Road) – Fairfax, Centreville	
Clifton	10.82	17.41	SR 641 (Chapel Road) – Clifton	
Clifton	12.09	19.46	SR 643 (Henderson Road) / SR 612 – Clifton, Manassas, Woodbridge	Leads to Clifton's Fairfax County–Prince William County bridge
Fairfax Station	14.03	22.58	SR 610 (Wolf Run Shoals Road) – Fairfax Station	
Fairfax Station	15.76	25.36	SR 123 (Ox Road) – Fairfax, Occoquan	
Fairfax Station	16.84	27.10	SR 286 (Fairfax County Parkway)	
Burke	19.09	30.72	SR 652 east (Burke Road) – Burke	East only; intersection broken by Southern Railway tracks.
Burke	19.17	30.85	SR 652 west (Burke Road) – Burke	West only; intersection broken by Southern Railway tracks
Burke–Springfield line	20.11	32.36	SR 638 (Rolling Road) – Springfield	
Springfield–Annandale line	20.38	32.80	SR 620 (Braddock Road) – Alexandria, Centreville	Eastern terminus of SR 645
1.000 mi = 1.609 km; 1.000 km = 0.621 mi
