= Deconhil Shipping Company =

US shipping company

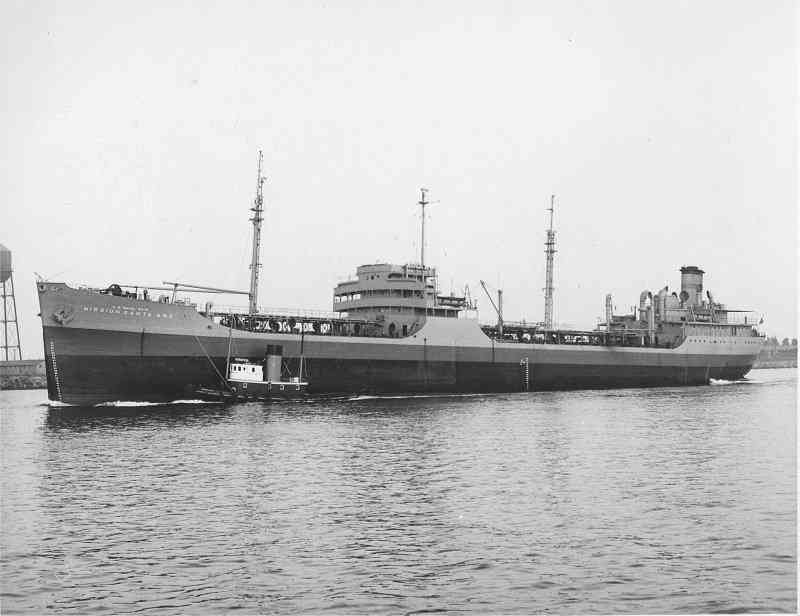
USNS Mission Santa Ana a T2 Tanker getting underway in Long Beach, California

Assembly and Construction of T2 Navy Tankers

Deconhil Shipping Company was a shipping company founded in San Francisco, California. Deconhil Shipping Company president was Joseph J. Coney. Joseph J. Coney also had part ownership of the San Francisco tanker company Hillcone Steamship Company since 1929. Deconhil Shipping Company operated Fleet oilers for the United States Navy to support World War II efforts. Deconhil Shipping Company operated a fleet of tankers for the War Shipping Administration.

== Operation ==
Deconhil Shipping Company operated Type T2 tankers and other tankers. Each War Deconhil Shipping Company had a merchant crew of about 9 officers and 39 men. War Emergency Tankers continued operations after the war for a few years.

- Some ships:
- USS Nausett (IX-190)
- SS Chemawa, Civilian Deconhil Shipping Company crew with United States Navy Armed Guard

Deconhil Shipping Company crew operated the ships and the US Navy supplied United States Navy Armed Guards to man the deck guns and radio. The most common armament mounted on these merchant ships were the Oerlikon 20 mm cannon and the 3"/50, 4"/50, and 5"/38 deck guns.

== See also ==
- Interocean Shipping Company
- World War II United States Merchant Navy
