= USS Sangamon (CVE-26) =

Escort carriers of the United States Navy

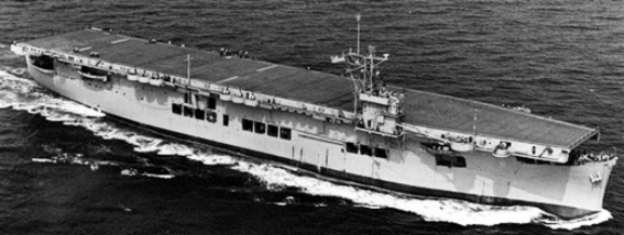
- USS Sangamon (ACV-26), September 1942

History

United States
- Name: Esso Trenton
- Owner: Standard Oil Company
- Ordered: as type (T2-S2-A1) hull, MCE hull 7
- Awarded: 3 January 1939
- Builder: Federal Shipbuilding and Dry Dock Company, Kearny, New Jersey
- Cost: $876,284.03
- Yard number: 153
- Way number: 5
- Laid down: 13 March 1939
- Launched: 4 November 1939
- Sponsored by: Mrs. Clara Esselborn
- In service: 14 December 1939
- Out of service: 22 October 1940
- Fate: Sold to US Navy, 22 October 1940

United States
- Name: Sangamon
- Namesake: Sangamon River, in Illinois
- Acquired: 22 October 1940
- Commissioned: 23 October 1940
- Decommissioned: 25 February 1942
- Identification: Hull symbol: AO-28; Callsign: NEPK
- Recommissioned: 25 August 1942
- Decommissioned: 24 October 1945
- Refit: Newport News Shipbuilding and Drydock Co., Newport News, Virginia
- Stricken: 1 November 1945
- Identification: Hull symbol: AVG-26 (14 February 1942); ACV-26 (20 August 1942); CVE-26 (15 July 1943); Callsign: NWQD
- Fate: Sold, 11 February 1948, scrapped in Osaka, Japan, August 1960

General characteristics as fleet oiler
- Class & type: Cimarron-class oiler
- Displacement: 7,470 long tons (7,590 t) light; 25,425 long tons (25,833 t) full load
- Length: 525 ft (160 m) wl
- Beam: 75 feet (23 m)
- Draft: 32 ft 3 in (9.83 m)
- Installed power: 4 × Babcock & Wilcox steam boilers (450 psi (3,100 kPa)); 13,500 shp (10,100 kW)
- Propulsion: 2 × Westinghouse geared steam turbines; 2 × shafts
- Speed: 18.3 kn (33.9 km/h; 21.1 mph)
- Capacity: 122,400 bbl (19,460 m^{3}) of oil; 805,000 US gal (3,050,000 L; 670,000 imp gal) of gasoline
- Complement: 301 officers and men
- Armament: 4 × single 5 in (130 mm)/51 cal guns]; 4 × twin Bofors 40 mm (1.6 in) anti-aircraft guns; 4 × twin Oerlikon 20 mm (0.79 in) anti-aircraft cannons

General characteristics as escort carrier
- Class & type: Sangamon-class escort carrier
- Displacement: 11,400 long tons (11,583 t) standard; 24,275 long tons (24,665 t) full
- Length: 553 ft 6 in (168.71 m) oa; 503 ft (153 m) flight deck
- Beam: 75 ft (23 m); 105 ft (32 m) flight deck
- Draft: 30 ft 7 in (9.32 m)
- Range: 23,920 nmi (44,300 km; 27,530 mi) at 15 kn (28 km/h; 17 mph)
- Complement: 830 officers and men
- Sensors & processing systems: SG Radar
- Armament: 2 × 5"/51 caliber guns; 4 × twin Bofors 40 mm L/60 anti-aircraft guns; 12 × single Oerlikon 20 mm cannons
- Aircraft carried: 25
- Aviation facilities: 1 × hydraulic catapult; 2 × elevators

General characteristics 1945
- Complement: 1,080 officers and men
- Armament: 2 × quad Bofors 40 mm L/60 anti-aircraft guns; 10 × twin Bofors 40 mm L/60 anti-aircraft guns; 19 × single Oerlikon 20 mm cannons
- Aircraft carried: 32
- Aviation facilities: 2 × hydraulic catapults

Service record
- Operations: World War II
- Awards: 8 battle stars. Her three air groups were each awarded the Presidential Unit Citation

USS Sangamon (AVG/ACV/CVE-26), was a US Navy escort carrier of World War II. She was originally built as Esso Trenton, one of twelve tankers built to a joint Navy-Maritime Commission design; this design was later duplicated and designated a T3-S2-A1 oiler. She was acquired by the Navy in October 1940, renamed Sangamon, and used as a Cimarron-class fleet oiler. In 1942, she was converted into the lead ship of the Sangamon-class escort carrier. Originally classified as an "Aircraft Escort Vessel", and designated AVG-26, in February 1942, she was reclassified as an "Auxiliary Aircraft Carrier", ACV-26, in August 1942. When the US Navy had another major reclassification on 15 July 1943, Sangamon was again reclassified, this time as an "Escort Carrier", CVE-26. She was named after the Sangamon River, in Illinois.

== Construction ==
Esso Trenton was laid down by the Federal Shipbuilding and Dry Dock Company, in Kearny, New Jersey, MC hull 7, on 13 March 1939, and launched on 4 November 1939.

== Civilian service ==
Esso Trenton was delivered on 14 December 1939, to her new owner and operator, Standard Oil of New Jersey, for runs from Gulf Coast ports to the East Coast.

== Service history ==
Nearly a year after being put into service, Esso Trenton was acquired by the United States Navy, on 22 October 1940, and renamed Sangamon. She was classified, AO-28, one of 35 Cimarron-class fleet oilers, and commissioned on 23 October 1940.

=== Fleet oiler service ===
After service off the West Coast and in Hawaiian waters, Sangamon shifted to the Atlantic Fleet, in the spring of 1941, and through the Neutrality Patrol period. She once again carried fuel from the Gulf Coast oil ports to bases on the East Coast, and now, Canada and Iceland. On 7 December 1941, she was at Naval Station Argentia, Newfoundland, offloading her cargo. Within the week, she started south again to renew her schedule on a tighter time frame.

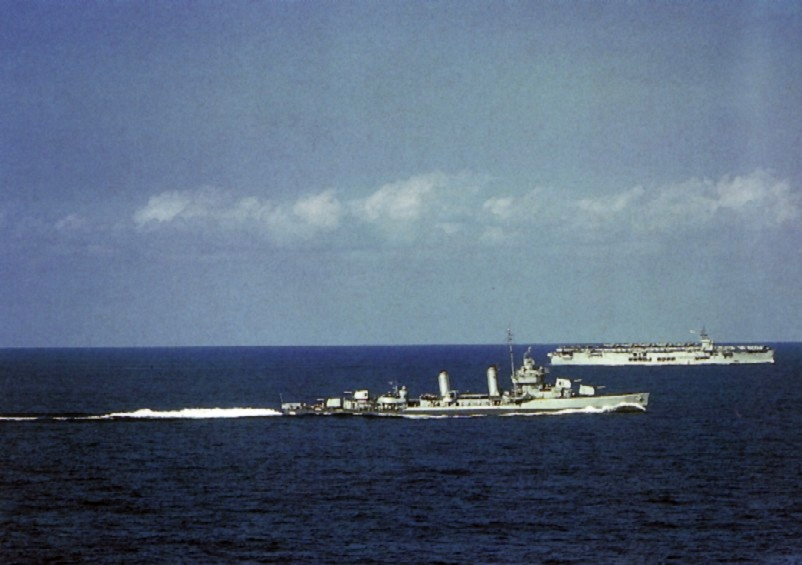
Sangamon and the destroyer Hambleton in the Atlantic, 1942.

=== Conversion to escort carrier ===
In early 1942, she was selected for conversion to an "Aircraft Escort Vessel" (AVG). On 11 February, she arrived in Newport News, Virginia. Three days later, she was reclassified AVG-26; and on 25 February, she was decommissioned and conversion was begun at the Newport News Shipbuilding and Drydock Co.

During the spring and summer, the need for auxiliary carriers, later called escort carriers, increased. Work on Sangamon, three other Cimarron-class oilers, and 20 C-3 merchant hulls was continued and sped up. In August, Sangamon, the first of her class was ready. Her conversion had added a flight deck that was 502 ft (153 m) long and 81 ft (25 m) wide, two center mounted elevators, a hangar deck, an aircraft catapult, sonar gear, aircraft ordnance magazines, workshops, and stowage space for aviation spares. Her accommodations had been enlarged to house her increased complement and embarked aviation personnel. Her 5 in (130 mm)/51 caliber guns, had been reduced to two and mounted at the fantail, she retained her four twin mount 40 mm (1.6 in) Bofors guns, and increased her 20 mm (0.79 in) Oerlikon cannons to twelve single mounts, from four twin mounts, to increase her anti-aircraft defense. On 20 August, she was again reclassified, as an "Auxiliary Aircraft Carrier", ACV-26; and five days later, she was recommissioned.

Sangamon and her three sister T3 conversions were considered very successful escort carrier designs, larger and more stable than the smaller C3-derived Bogue class; additionally, they retained substantial oil bunkerage, useful in refueling destroyers in company. The late-war purpose-built Commencement Bay-class escort carriers were derived from the Sangamons.

=== WWII service history ===
==== 1942 ====
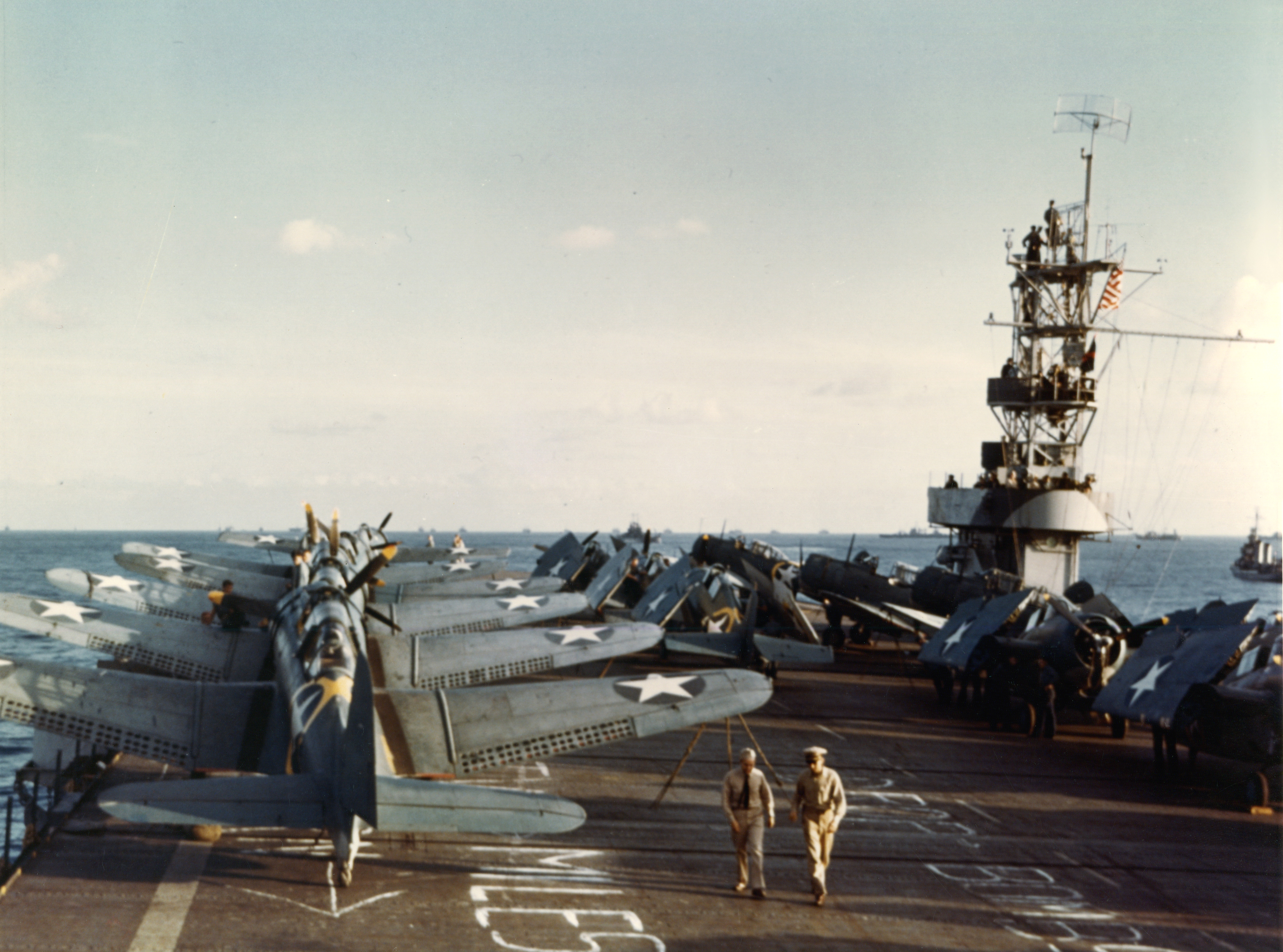
Composite Squadron 26 (VC-26) aircraft on Sangamon in November 1942.

Shakedown in Chesapeake Bay and off Bermuda followed a return to the yard for repair and improvements to her ventilation system. On 25 October she sailed east with Task Force 34 (TF 34) to provide air cover for Operation Torch, the invasion of North Africa. Assigned to the Northern Support Force, she arrived off Port Lyautey, on 8 November. Prior to and during the landings, and subsequent action, her air group, Composite Squadron 26 (VC-26) flew combat air patrol (CAP), anti-submarine patrol (ASP), and ground support missions. At mid-month, she got underway to return to Norfolk, where, after repairs, she sailed for Panama and the Pacific.

==== 1943 ====
By mid-January 1943, Sangamon had arrived at Éfaté, New Hebrides. As a unit of Carrier Division 22 (CarDiv 22), she operated in the New Caledonia—New Hebrides—Solomon Islands area for the next eight months. With her sister ships, Suwannee and Chenango, she provided protection for resupply convoys en route to Guadalcanal and for the assault forces moving on the Russell Islands.

Redesignated CVE-26 on 15 July 1943, Sangamon shifted her base of operations from Efate, to Espiritu Santo, in August, and in September, she returned to the United States for an overhaul at Mare Island. There she received more modern equipment for her flight deck and a combat information center.

On 19 October, she departed San Diego, with VC-37 embarked and sailed for Espiritu Santo. She got underway from the latter on 13 November, rendezvoused with Task Force 53 the next day, and on 20 October, arrived in the Gilberts to support the assault on Tarawa Atoll. During the first two days of this operation, her planes struck enemy positions on the island. Then, through 6 December, they were sent out on CAP and ASP missions to protect the escort carrier group and the target area.

==== 1944 ====
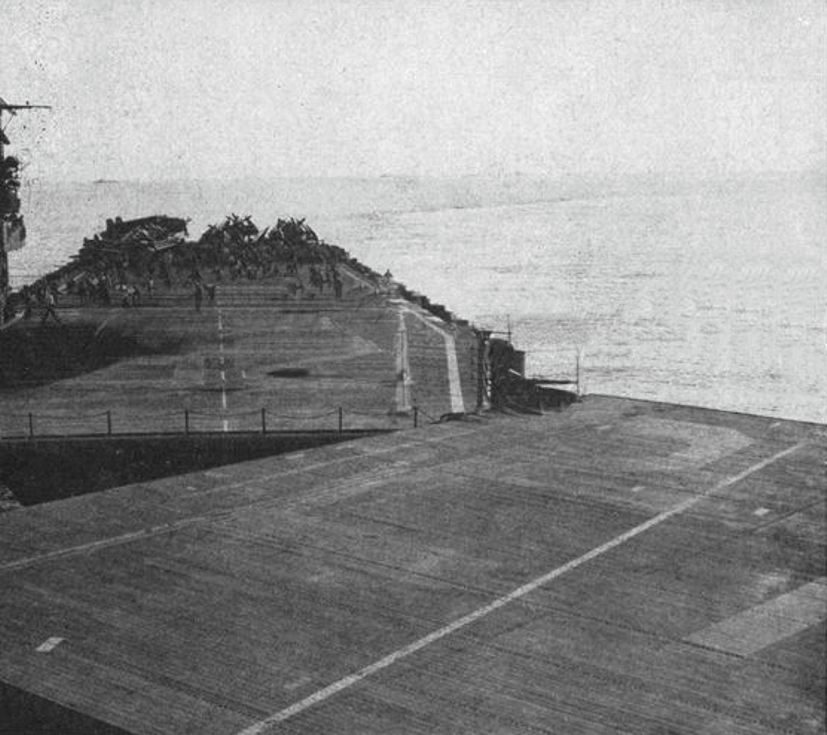
Collision between Sangamon and Suwannee, 26 January 1944

Sangamon set course to return to San Diego. In early January 1944, she trained off southern California, and on 13 January, sailed west. Steaming via Pearl Harbor, she pushed on toward her next amphibious operation, the assault on Kwajalein in the Marshall Islands. For this operation Sangamon was part of a task group with two other carriers, Suwannee and Chenango, with Sangamon serving as the flagship.

At 16:51, on 25 January, during routine flight operations, an F6F-3 Hellcat (Bureau number 40845) from fighter squadron VF-37 failed to hook a wire on landing, broke through the barriers, and crashed into parked planes on the forward flight deck. Its belly tank, torn loose, skidded forward, spewing flaming fuel. Fire soon spread among the planes. It raged along the flight deck and flames beat up over the bridge, making ship control extremely difficult. The carrier was turned out of the wind, so that the fire could be fought. By 16:59, it was under control. Seven of the crew died in those eight minutes. Seven others were seriously injured, and of the 15 who jumped over the side to escape the flames, 13 were picked up, two were missing. The accident also destroyed four Hellcats and a SBD Dauntless was knocked overboard. Later the same day, a TBM Avenger crashed into parked aircraft while landing, damaging beyond repair three SBD Dauntless' and another TBM, fortunately without serious injuries.

The next day, 26 January, Sangamon collided with Suwannee. This was at low speed; no personnel were injured on either ship and Suwannee bore the brunt of the damage, with 20 ft (6.1 m) of her flight deck buckled. However the damage was not significant enough to prevent either carrier from continuing air operations.

Temporary repairs were made at sea, and from 31 January, to mid-February, Sangamon supported the assault and occupation of Kwajalein. She then moved on to Enewetak, where her planes covered the landing forces from 17 to 24 February. On the latter date, she departed the Marshalls, and headed back to Pearl Harbor, to complete repairs.

On 15 March, Sangamon got underway again. Departing Hawaii, she rendezvoused with Task Group 50.15 (TG 50.15), the fast carrier force support group, on 26 March. For the remainder of the month, and into April, she escorted that group as it operated north of the Admiralty Islands, to refuel and resupply the fast carrier force, after it had conducted strikes on the Palaus. In early April, Sangamon retired to Espiritu Santo, and at mid-month, sailed for New Guinea. Briefly attached to the 7th Fleet, she covered the landing at Aitape, from 22 to 24 April; retired to Manus Island for two days, then returned to the Aitape area where she conducted patrols until 5 May.

Sangamon then returned to Espiritu Santo, where she departed on 19 May. Rehearsals for the Marianas campaign followed, and on 2 June, she sailed for the Marshalls. Rendezvousing with TF 53 en route, she covered that force to Kwajalein, then to the Mariana Islands. From 17 to 20 June, she guarded the force as it steamed to the east of Saipan, as a backup force for TF 52, which was then engaged in the assault on and the occupation of the island.

After the Battle of the Philippine Sea, Sangamon was detached from TF 53. On 21 June, she joined TF 52, and into July, she conducted operations in support of the occupation of Saipan. On 4 July, she steamed for Eniwetok; arrived on 7 July; and sortied again on 10 July. From 13 July to 1 August, she covered the bombardment groups engaged in the capture of Guam. On 4 August, she returned to Eniwetok, where on 9 August she proceeded to Manus Island, where she was anchored for almost a month.

On 9 September, Sangamon departed Seeadler Harbor and steamed for Morotai. There, from 15 to 27 September, she again covered Allied assault forces. After the initial waves had landed, her planes shifted from combat support to bombing and strafing missions to destroy Japanese airfields on nearby Halmahera.

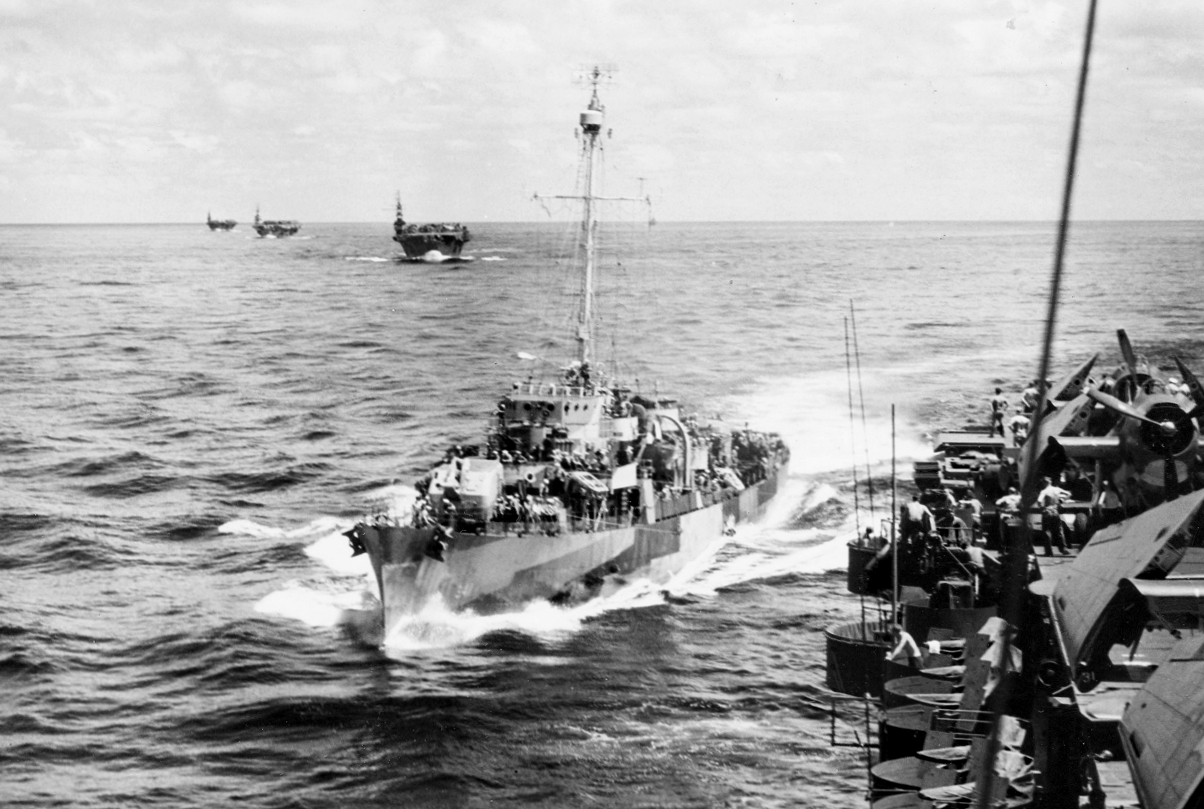
Sangamon refueling the destroyer Raymond, 15 October 1944. The other carriers in Sangamon's group can be seen in the distance

Sangamon again anchored in Seeadler Harbor, on 1 October. Twelve days later, she sortied with TG 77.4, the escort carrier group of the Leyte invasion force. That group, composed of 18 escort carriers, was broken down into Task Units 77.4.1, 77.4.2, and 77.4.3 (TU 77.4.1, 77.4.2, and 77.4.3), and referred to as "Taffy 1, 2, and 3", respectively. During the operation, they would steam to the east of Leyte Gulf: Taffy 1, including Sangamon, was off northern Mindanao; Taffy 2 off the entrance to Leyte Gulf; and Taffy 3 off Samar.

Prior to the 20 October landings on Leyte, Sangamon launched regular flights in support of the advance units of the invasion force and sent strikes against Leyte and Visayan Islands airfields. On 20 October, her planes covered the landing forces and the ships in the transport areas. That day, she also came under enemy air attack and took a hit at the main deck level. The bomb, dropped by an A6M5 Zero, tore a 2 ft × 6 ft (0.61 m × 1.83 m) section of plating loose, then fell into the sea and exploded some 900 ft (270 m) away from the carrier.

Enemy airfields again became Sangamon's primary targets in the days immediately following the landings. On 24 October, however, her planes fought off waves of Japanese aircraft over the landing area. Early on 25 October, two flights took off: one toward the Mindanao Sea to locate and finish off Japanese survivors of the Battle of Surigao Strait, the other toward Leyte, for CAP missions. About an hour later, Sangamon received word that Taffy 3, 120 nmi (220 km; 140 mi) to the north, had been attacked by the Japanese Center Force which had transited San Bernardino Strait during the night.

===== Battle off Samar =====
Within a half-hour, Sangamon's CAP flight had been diverted to Samar, and she had launched another smaller group to further aid the attacked unit. Soon thereafter, at about 07:40, as Taffy 1 planes were being recovered, rearmed, and launched, the unit became the target of the first strike of the Kamikaze unit.

Santee took the first hit, and as her flight and hangar decks blazed, Suwannee was attacked. Antiaircraft fire from Suwannee scored on the planes, which then dived toward Sangamon. A 5-inch shell from Suwannee finished one plane only 150 ft (46 m) from Sangamon. By 07:55, Japanese submarine I-56 had joined the fight, and, as Santee's crew brought her fires under control, sent a torpedo into that luckless CVE. Minutes later, Suwannee was hit by a "Zero" forward of the after elevator.

During the intense fighting, several of Sangamon's crew were injured and one was killed by strafing fire. Later in the morning, as the attacks fell off, she sent medical personnel to assist casualties of the damaged ships, then began bringing them aboard for treatment. At mid-day, she suffered malfunctions in her steering gear, electric generators, and catapult, but repairs were completed in time for her to launch afternoon strikes as scheduled. Those flights gave chase to the retreating Japanese Center Force.

On 26 October, Sangamon recovered her scattered planes and again launched CAP flights. At 12:15, enemy planes were reported coming in from the north. Several broke through the air defenses, and Suwanee suffered another kamikaze hit. On 29 October, the escort carriers retired.

Sangamon anchored in Seeadler Harbor, on 3 November. Six days later, she headed back to the United States for a shipyard overhaul.

==== 1945 ====
Sangamon returned to the United States for an overhaul at the Puget Sound Naval Shipyard, in Bremerton, Washington, that took from 30 November 1944 to 24 January 1945. During the overhaul, additional rocket stowage racks, a second catapult, improved radar gear, additional 40 mm gun mounts, a bomb elevator, and additional fire-fighting equipment were installed.

In mid-February Sangamon moved to Hawaii, to train a new squadron, VC-33, which included night fighters. On 16 March, she arrived at Ulithi, where she was temporarily detached from her division to join TU 52.1.1, one of the escort carrier groups assigned to the initial assault phase of Operation Iceberg, the invasion of the Ryukyu Islands.

On 21 March, Sangamon departed Ulithi, with other ships assigned to the Kerama Retto assault force. Covering the force en route, she operated to the south of Okinawa and launched planes for CAP and landing force support as Kerama Retto was secured. On 1 April, as the landings on the Hagushi beaches of Okinawa were taking place, she shifted to TU 52.1.3, thus rejoining CarDiv 22. Through 8 April, she continued to launch supporting strikes and patrol groups from an area some 50 nmi (93 km; 58 mi) south of Okinawa.

On 9 April, she moved with her unit into an area 70 nmi (130 km; 81 mi) east of Sakishima Gunto. From there, her planes raided airfields on Miyako and Ishigaki. Detached on 12 April, she again provided air support for the forces fighting on Okinawa, then covered the occupation of Iesha. On 18 April, she returned to Sakishima Islands. Dawn and dusk strikes were launched daily, and heckler flights were sent over the fields at night. On 22 April, eight fighters, and four bombers, of a dusk strike caught 25–30 enemy planes warming up on Nobara Field, central Miyako. Seven Nakajima Ki-43 "Oscars" attempted to intercept Sangamon's planes, but the attack was pressed home. After the bombers delivered their loads, the fighters engaged the "Oscars" and shot down five. Night fighters from Sangamon were diverted to the area and arrived as four more "Oscars" joined the fight; two of the four were shot down.

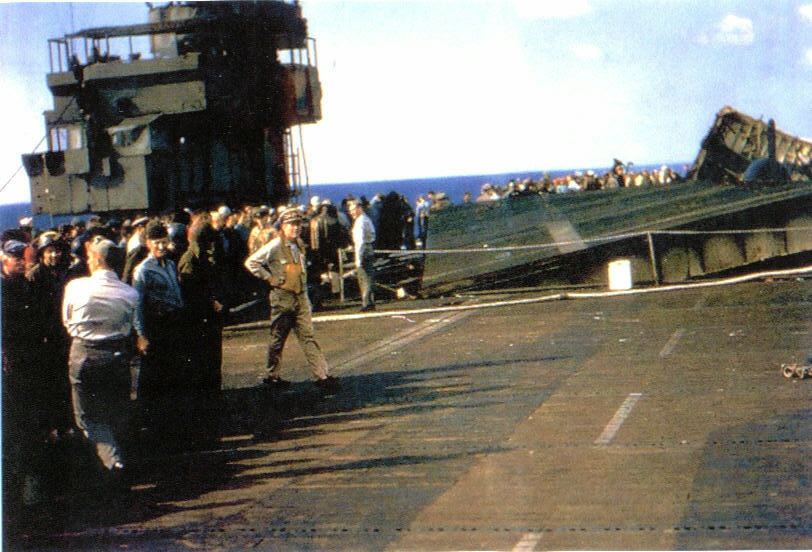
The internal explosions caused by the kamikaze attack of 4 May 1945, blew both aircraft elevators out of place.

Through the end of the month, Sangamon continued to launch her planes to neutralize Japanese airfields. On 4 May, she put into Kerama Retto, to rearm. Loading, frequently interrupted by the presence of Japanese planes in the area, was not completed until evening. At 18:30, the Sangamon got underway. Japanese attackers, however, were soon reported only some 29 nmi (54 km; 33 mi) off. Land-based fighters were vectored out to intercept the enemy planes and shot down nine. One got through and at about 19:00, began circling toward a position on Sangamon's port quarter. The escort carrier went into a hard left turn to avoid the enemy and to maneuver into a position to launch her aircraft. She then opened fire and was joined by her escorts. The enemy crashed into the water some 25 ft (7.6 m) off the starboard beam.

Other enemy aircraft followed the first. At 19:25, another broke through the interceptor screen, ran into clouds to avoid anti-aircraft fire, then came out and, with increased speed, headed for Sangamon. At 19:33, the kamikaze dropped his bomb and crashed into the center of the flight deck. The bomb and parts of the plane penetrated the deck and exploded below. Initial damage was extensive, fires broke out on the flight deck, the hangar deck, and in the fuel deck, communications from the bridge were lost within 15 minutes, and the ship was soon out of control.

The action of Sangamon swinging through the wind caused the flames and smoke to change direction, spreading the fires. By 20:15, steering control had been established, and the ship was brought back to a course which helped the crew fight the many fires. But water pressure was low, as the fire main and risers had ruptured. Carbon dioxide bottles were brought into action. Nearby ships came alongside to assist. By 22:30, all fires were under control. Communication with other units had been regained; at first through the radio of Fullam, then by using a VHF channel in the sole remaining aircraft aboard. At 23:20, Sangamon, with 11 dead, 25 missing, and 21 seriously wounded, got underway to return to Kerama Retto, for temporary repairs.

From Kerama Retto, Sangamon proceeded via Ulithi and Pearl Harbor, to Norfolk, for repairs. Work was suspended with the cessation of hostilities in mid-August. She was decommissioned on 24 October, and struck from the Naval Vessel Register on 1 November.

== Fate ==
She was subsequently sold to Hillcone Steamship Company, San Francisco, and was delivered to that company's representative at Norfolk, on 11 February 1948. She passed through multiple owners through the 1950s, and ultimately was scrapped in Osaka, Japan, starting in August 1960.

== Awards ==
Sangamon earned eight battle stars during World War II. Her three air groups were each awarded the Presidential Unit Citation.

== Biography ==
- "Shipborn Search Sets". Department of the Navy. 28 August 2006. Archived from the original on 2 June 2007.
- "Sangamon II (AO-28/CVE-26)". 6 September 2019.
- Yarnall, Paul (17 April 2025). "USS SANGAMON (ACV-26)".
- Y'Blood, William T. (1987). The Little Giants: U.S. Escort Carriers Against Japan. Naval Institute Press. ISBN 978-0-87021-275-8.
