= Virginia State Route 255 =

State highway in Clarke County, Virginia, US

State Route 255
- Bishop Meade Highway

Route information
- Maintained by VDOT
- Length: 3.84 mi (6.18 km)
- Existed: 1933–present
- Tourist routes: Virginia Byway

Major junctions
- South end: US 17 / US 50 / SR 624 near Millwood
- North end: US 340 at Briggs

Location
- Country: United States
- State: Virginia
- Counties: Clarke

Highway system
- Virginia Routes; Interstate; US; Primary; Secondary; Byways; History; HOT lanes
← SR 254	→ SR 256

State Route 255 (SR 255) is a primary state highway in the U.S. state of Virginia. Known as Bishop Meade Highway, the state highway runs 3.84 miles (6.18 km) from U.S. Route 17 and US 50 near Millwood north to US 340 at Briggs in southern Clarke County.

SR 255 is a Virginia Byway.

== Route description ==
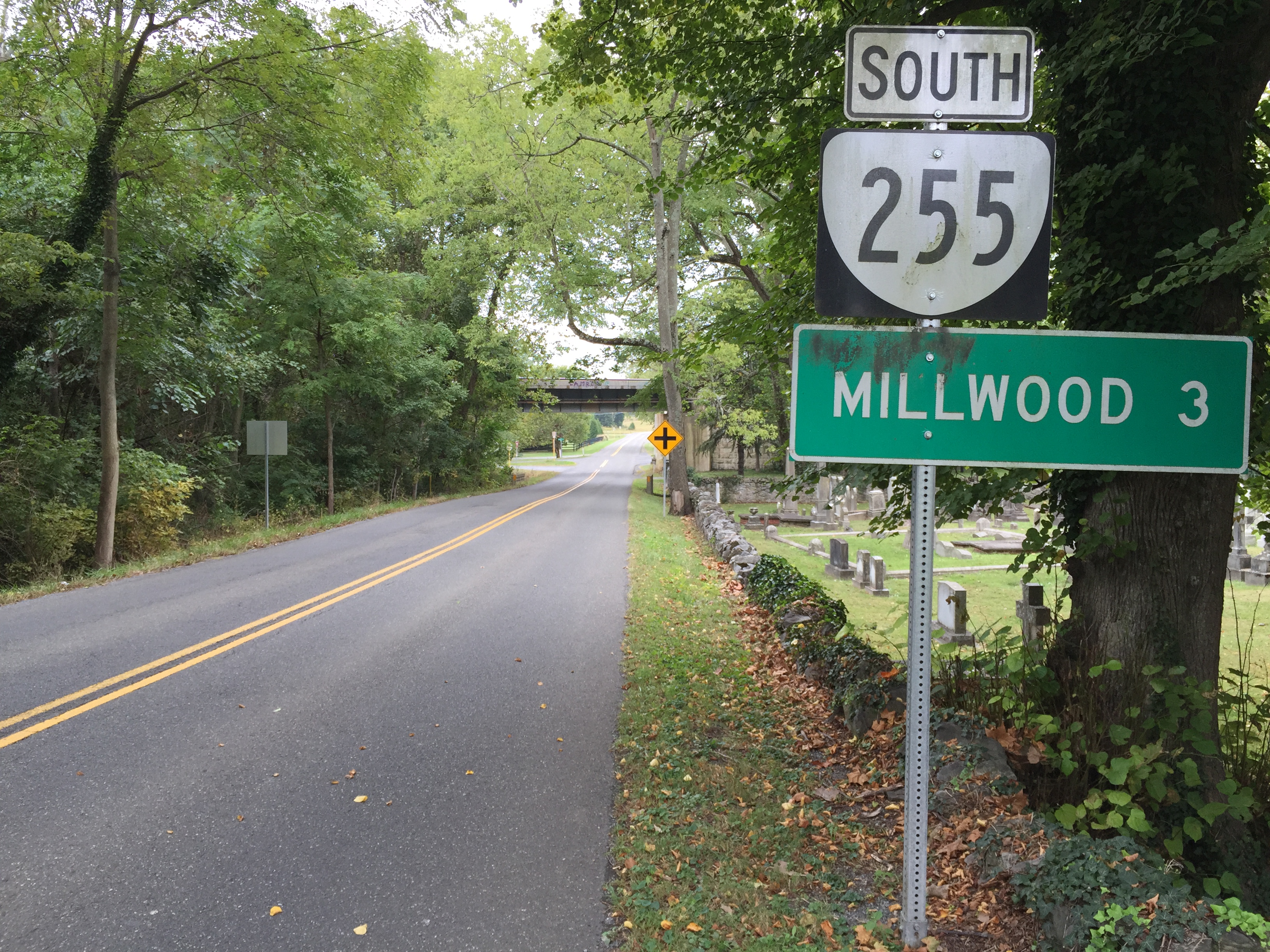
View south at the north end of SR 255 at US 340 in Briggs

SR 255 begins at an intersection with US 17 and US 50 (Millwood Pike) south of Millwood. The state highway heads north as a two-lane undivided road through the village of Millwood, the location of several historic sites including the estate Carter Hall. SR 255 continues north through the hamlet of Claytonville. The state highway passes under Norfolk Southern Railway's Hagerstown District before reaching its eastern terminus at US 340 (Lord Fairfax Highway) in the village of Briggs.

== Major intersections ==
The entire route is in Clarke County.

Location	mi	km	Destinations	Notes
	0.00	0.00	US 17 / US 50 (John Mosby Highway) / SR 624 (Red Gate Road) – Paris, Winchester	Southern terminus
Millwood			SR 723 (Millwood Road)	south end of SR 723 overlap; former US 50 east
Millwood			SR 723 (Millwood Road)	north end of SR 723 overlap; former US 50 west
Briggs	3.84	6.18	US 340 (Lord Fairfax Highway) – Boyce, Berryville	Northern terminus
1.000 mi = 1.609 km; 1.000 km = 0.621 mi

< SR 810	District 8 State Routes; 1928–1933	SR 812 >
