= Fair Lakes, Virginia =

- Census-designated place
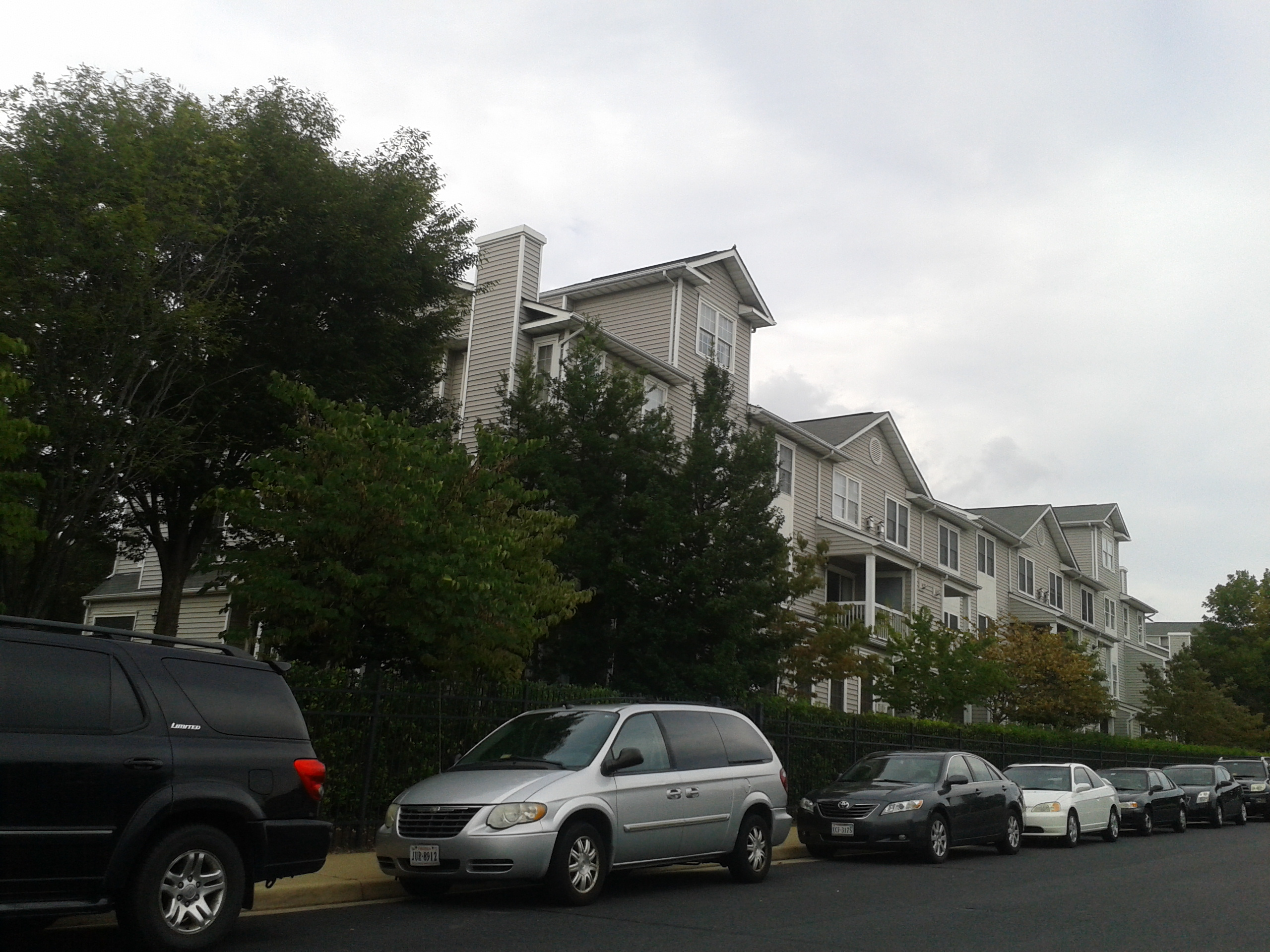
- Condominium complex in Fair Lakes, August, 2017

- Location within Northern Virginia Location within Virginia Location within the United States
- Coordinates: 38°51′47″N 77°22′55″W
- Country: United States
- State: Virginia
- County: Fairfax

Area
  - Total: 2.42 sq mi (6.26 km^{2})
  - Land: 2.39 sq mi (6.19 km^{2})
  - Water: 0.023 sq mi (0.06 km^{2})
- Elevation: 400 ft (120 m)

Population (2020)
  - Total: 8,404
  - Density: 3,516/sq mi (1,357.7/km^{2})
- Time zone: UTC−5 (Eastern (EST))
  - Summer (DST): UTC−4 (EDT)
- ZIP code: 22033
- Area codes: 703, 571
- FIPS code: 51-26701
- GNIS feature ID: 2584844

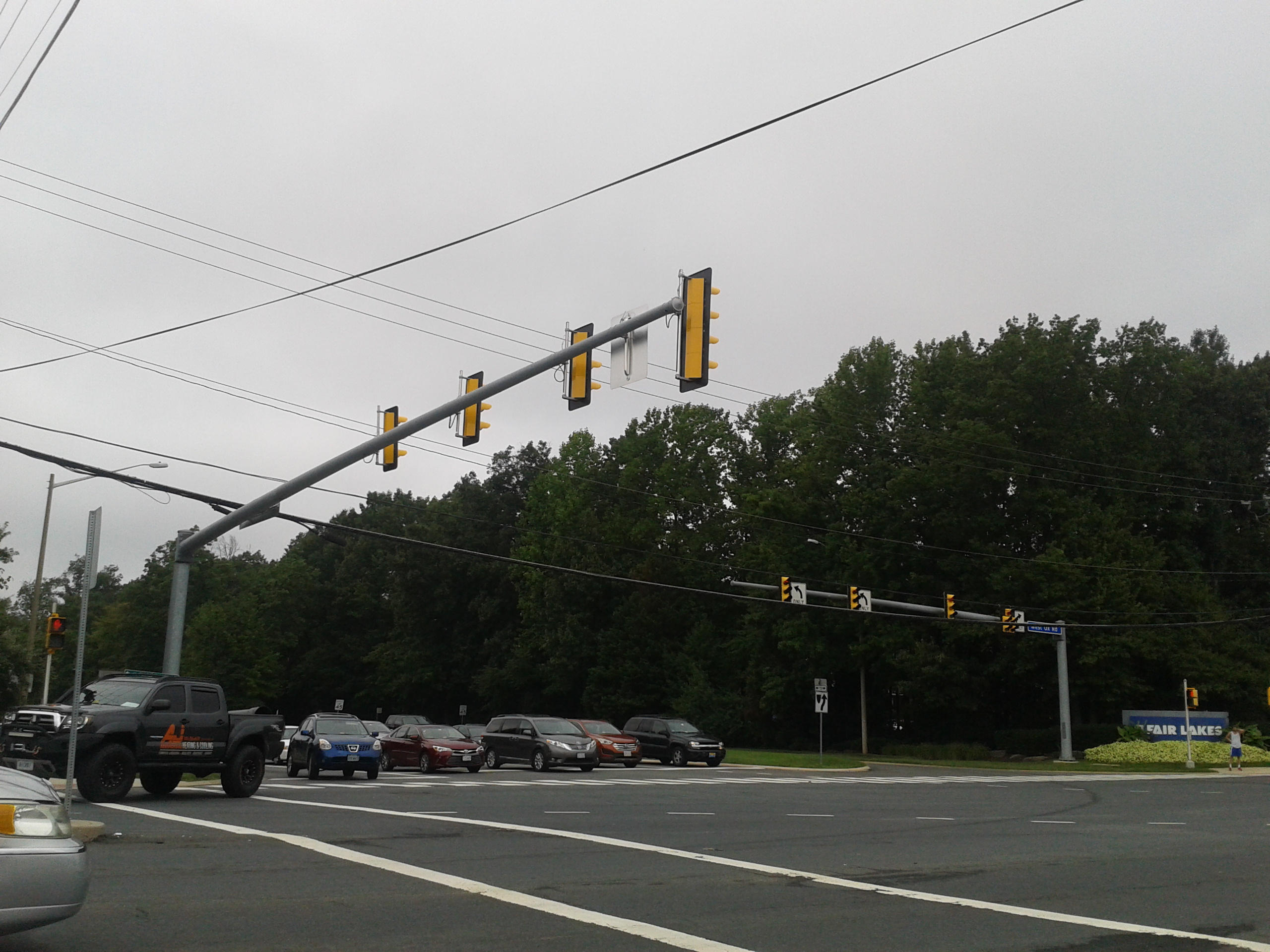
Entrance to the Fair Lakes development along West Ox Rd.

Fair Lakes is a census-designated place (CDP) and business park located west of Fairfax in Fairfax County, Virginia, United States. Fair Lakes had a population of 8,404 in 2020.

== Geography ==
Fair Lakes is a mixed-use development of upscale residential apartments and commercial buildings, built by the Peterson Companies.

The main road in Fair Lakes is the Fair Lakes Parkway. Other major roads that pass through the area are the Fairfax County Parkway (SR 286); West Ox Road (SR 608), and SR 6751 / Monument Drive. SR 645 / Stringfellow Road forms the western boundary of Fair Lakes, and is also the western terminus for the Fair Lakes Parkway. An interchange with Interstate 66 is at the center of the Fair Lakes CDP. The southern border of the CDP follows U.S. Route 29 (Lee Highway).

- SR 7700 / Fair Lakes Parkway
- SR 286 / Fairfax County Parkway
- SR 608 / West Ox Road
- SR 645 / Stringfellow Road
- Interstate 66

Fair Lakes is bordered by Centreville to the west, Greenbriar to the north, and Fair Oaks to the east. Unincorporated land that is not part of any census-designated place is to the south across Route 29, including Cobbs Corner and Blevinstown. The center of Fairfax is 5 miles (8 km) to the east, and downtown Washington, D.C. is 22 miles (35 km) to the east along I-66.

According to the U.S. Census Bureau, the Fair Lakes CDP has a total area of 2.42 square miles (6.26 km^{2}), of which 2.39 square miles (6.19 km^{2}) is land and 0.02 square miles (0.06 km^{2}), or 1.00%, is water.

== History ==
The area was farm land until planned development of the office parks and neighborhoods began in the 1980s and 1990s.

== Demographics ==
Historical population
Census	Pop.	Note	%±
2010	7,942		—
2020	8,404		5.8%
U.S. Decennial Census; 2010 2020

Fair Lakes was first listed as a census designated place in the 2010 U.S. census formed from part of Chantilly CDP and additional area.

Fair Lakes CDP, Virginia – Racial and ethnic composition Note: the US Census treats Hispanic/Latino as an ethnic category. This table excludes Latinos from the racial categories and assigns them to a separate category. Hispanics/Latinos may be of any race.
Race / Ethnicity (NH = Non-Hispanic)	Pop 2010	Pop 2020	% 2010	% 2020
White alone (NH)	3,740	3,230	47.09%	38.43%
Black or African American alone (NH)	670	792	8.44%	9.42%
Native American or Alaska Native alone (NH)	10	6	0.13%	0.07%
Asian alone (NH)	2,616	3,120	32.94%	37.13%
Native Hawaiian or Pacific Islander alone (NH)	2	6	0.03%	0.07%
Other race alone (NH)	16	75	0.20%	0.89%
Mixed race or Multiracial (NH)	282	468	3.55%	5.57%
Hispanic or Latino (any race)	606	707	7.63%	8.41%
Total	7,942	8,404	100.00%	100.00%

At the 2020 census (some information from the 2022 American Community Survey) there were 8,404 people, 3,563 housing units and 3,621 households residing in the CDP. The population density was 3,516.3 inhabitants per square mile (1,357.7 inhabitants/km^{2}). The average housing unit density was 1,490.8 per square mile (575.6/km^{2}). The racial makeup of the CDP was 40.29% White, 9.61% African American, 0.19% Native American, 37.24% Asian, 0.07% Pacific Islander, 3.22% from other races, and 9.36% from two or more races. Hispanic or Latino of any race was 8.41% of the population.

Of the households, 57.7% were married couple families, 17.2% were a male family householder with no spouse, and 19.0% were a female family householder with no spouse. The average family household had 2.99 people.

The median age was 38.2, 18.2% of people were under the age of 18, and 11.4% were 65 years of age or older. The largest ancestry is the 7.4% who had German ancestry, 45.2% spoke a language other than English at home, and 38.9% were born outside the United States, 67.4% of whom were naturalized citizens.

The median income for a household in the CDP was $123,387, and the median income for a family was $140,921. 7.8% of the population were military veterans, and 67.4% had a batchelor's degree or higher. In the CDP 7.3% of the population was below the poverty line, including 6.2% of those under the age of 18 and 20.1% of those aged 65 or over, with 4.7% of the population without health insurance.

=== 2010 census ===
Fair Lakes had a population of 7,942 at the 2010 census.

== Major amenities ==
=== Malls and shopping centers ===
- East Market at Fair Lakes
- Fair Lakes Center
- Fair Lakes Promenade
- Fair Oaks Mall
- The Shops of Fair Lakes

=== Private schools ===
- Chesterbrook Academy
- Fair Lakes Children's Center

=== Companies ===
- Argon ST, Inc., a wholly owned subsidiary of Boeing
- CGI Group
- General Dynamics
- Northrop Grumman
- SRA International
