= USS Nausett (IX-190) =

United States Navy tanker

History

United States
- Name: W. M. Irish (1918 - 1943); Moskva (1943 - 1944); Nausett (1944 - 1946)
- Builder: Bethlehem Shipbuilding Corp., Alameda, California
- Launched: 30 December 1917, as SS W. M. Irish
- Acquired: 29 October 1944
- Commissioned: 8 January 1945
- Decommissioned: 12 October 1945
- Renamed: Nausett, 29 October 1944
- Stricken: 24 October 1945
- Identification: Official number: 216249
- Fate: Scrapped 1946

General characteristics
- Type: Oil tanker
- Tonnage: 7,123 GRT; 10,850 DWT
- Displacement: 4,496 long tons (4,568 t)
- Length: 453 ft (138 m)
- Beam: 56 ft (17 m)

USS Nausett (IX–190) was a tanker serving as an auxiliary ship in the United States Navy during World War II. Built as W. M. Irish the ship was a commercial tanker until taken by the War Shipping Administration (WSA) during World War II. WSA first allocated the ship to the Army and then as lend lease to the Soviet Union where the ship was renamed Moskva. On return the ship was renamed Nausett and allocated to the Navy which first accepted the vessel and then found it too expensive to make suitable. The ship was returned to WSA, placed in reserve and sold for scrap the next year.

== Pre-Navy history ==
The ship was built as W. M. Irish, completed in April 1918, by the Bethlehem Shipbuilding Corp., Alameda, California. The tanker, assigned official number 216249, was operated by the Atlantic Refining Company, Philadelphia, Pennsylvania until acquired 20 January 1942 by the War Shipping Administration (WSA) at New Haven, Connecticut and allocated to the Army the same day for operation under a Transportation Corps agreement. On 23 May 1943 at Loa Angeles the ship was conveyed to the Soviet Union under lend lease which operated the vessel as Moskva until the ship was returned and placed under a WSA general agreement with Deconhil Shipping Company.

== Acquired by the U.S. Navy ==
Renamed Nausett on 29 October 1944, she was accepted by the Navy on a bareboat charter and commissioned at Pearl Harbor on 8 January 1945. On further inspection, necessary alterations were deemed too expensive to warrant the expenditure.

In June, Nausett was placed in reduced commission pending her return to WSA on the West Coast. On 23 September 1945, she arrived at San Francisco, California, where she decommissioned and was delivered to WSA, on 12 October 1945. Twelve days later she was struck from the Navy Register.

== Fate ==
The ship was placed in the Suisun Bay Reserve Fleet on 12 October 1945 with a note that the ship had a breakdown on the way and had to be towed to the mooring. The vessel was purchased for scrap by American Iron & Metal on 27 November 1946 for $7,217.
