= Hillcone Steamship Company =

The Hillcone Steamship Company was a United States based steamship company that operated from 1929 to 1970. It was based in San Francisco, California and was owned by businessmen Joseph J. Coney and Stanley Hiller, Sr. Ships it is known to have owned include the USS William Isom (ID-1555), which it had acquired by 1931 when it was renamed the Edwin B. De Golia. It also bought the USS Sangamon after she was decommissioned on October 24, 1945.

== Vessels ==
- SS Cornell
- USS Sangamon
- Edwin B. De Golia
- USS Salinas (AO-19)

== See also ==
- Deconhil Shipping Company
