= Virginia State Route 612 (Fairfax and Prince William Counties) =

Secondary state highway in Virginia, United States

State Route 612

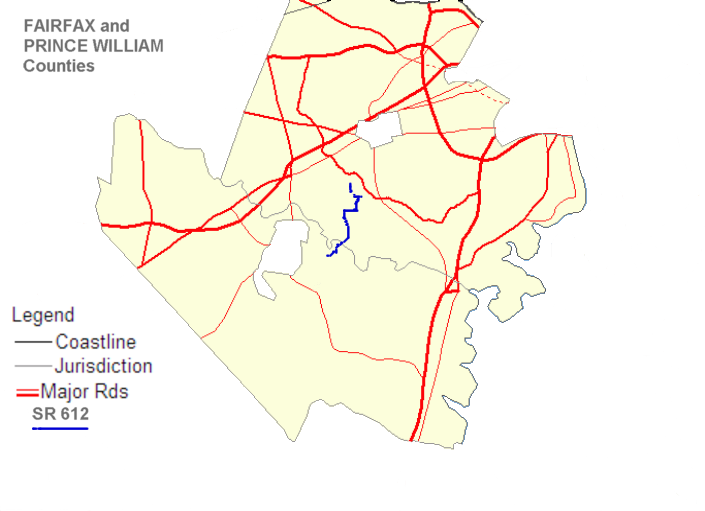

Route information
- Maintained by VDOT
- Length: 11.41 mi (18.36 km) Colchester Road: 3.93 mi Yates Ford Road (Fairfax): 2.15 mi Henderson Road: 1.60 mi Old Yates Ford Road: 0.89 mi Yates Ford Road (Prince William): 2.30 mi

Major junctions
- North end: SR 620 at the Clifton / Fairfax border
- SR 645 / Clifton Road in Clifton; SR 643 / Henderson Road in Clifton
- South end: SR 294 (Prince William Parkway) near Manassas

Location
- Country: United States
- State: Virginia

Highway system
- Virginia Routes; Interstate; US; Primary; Secondary; Byways; History; HOT lanes

State Route 612 in Fairfax and Prince William counties, Virginia, is a secondary state highway. The two counties are separated by water (at this point the separation is Bull Run), so SR 612 contains a bridge that is one of only eight crossings between the counties. Because of this, SR 612 is heavily traveled during rush hour.

== Route description ==
SR 612 uses five different names: Colchester Road, Yates Ford Road, Henderson Road, and Old Yates Ford Road in Fairfax County, and Yates Ford Road in Prince William County. There are also brief concurrencies with SR 645 (Clifton Road) and SR 641 (Chapel Road).

=== Colchester Road (Fairfax County) ===
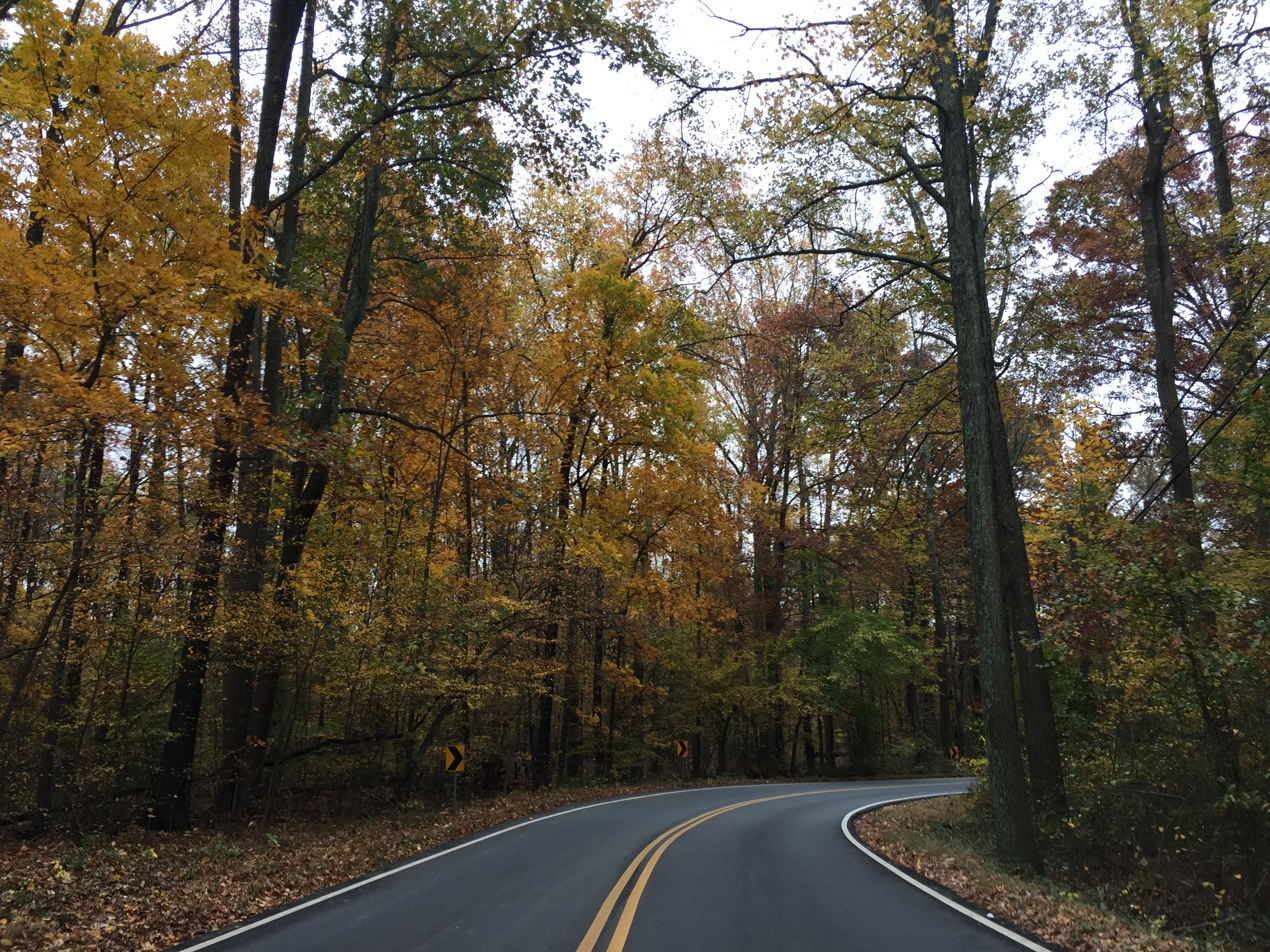
View south at the north end of SR 612 in [[Fairfax County, Virginia]]

SR 612 begins in Fairfax County at an intersection with SR 620 (Braddock Road) at the Clifton / Fairfax border and travels through a long residential area consisting of single-family homes. It ends at an intersection with SR 641 (Chapel Road) on the Clifton / Fairfax Station border. There is a portion of southern Colchester Road that is closed, so this segment is discontinuous. Colchester Road and all other Fairfax County portions of SR 612 are 2 lane roads.

=== Yates Ford Road (Fairfax County) ===
At this point SR 612 turns east and is concurrent with SR 641, Chapel Road. SR 612 then turns southwest on Yates Ford Road at the Clifton / Fairfax Station border and travels through another residential area consisting of single-family homes. It ends at an intersection with SR 645 (Clifton Road) in Clifton. This portion of SR 612 was designated a Virginia Byway on May 3, 1997.

=== Henderson Road (Fairfax County) ===
At this point SR 612 turns west and is concurrent with SR 645, Clifton Road. SR 612 then turns south on Henderson Road in Clifton. This is the beginning of the SR 612 commuter route as, on Henderson Road, SR 612 overlaps with SR 643. It ends at a Y intersection with SR 612 / Old Yates Ford Road and SR 643 / Henderson Road in Clifton. On this section the speed limit is 35 mph (56 km/h).

In the morning rush hour when the majority of traffic is heading northbound along SR 612, much eastbound traffic turns right on SR 646, Maple Branch Road, while much westbound traffic stays on SR 612. The two roads become practically parallel, and both intersect with SR 645, Clifton Road, two blocks apart. In the evening rush hour, this traffic pattern is reversed.

Both the concurrency with SR 645 and the concurrency with SR 643 have been designated as Virginia Byways. The SR 645 section was designated April 20, 1994, and Henderson Road was designated March 13, 2001.

=== Old Yates Ford Road (Fairfax County) ===
Old Yates Ford Road starts at the Y intersection mentioned above, and continues west toward the SR 612 Fairfax / Prince William Bridge. On this section the speed limit is 35 mph (56 km/h).

=== Yates Ford Road (Prince William County) ===
When SR 612 empties from the bridge to Prince William County, the speed limit is raised to 40 mph (64 km/h). It stays 2 lanes until just before an intersection with SR 663 / Davis Ford Road Then it becomes a 5 lane undivided road, with a center turn lane and two thru lanes in each direction. Most traffic headed toward Woodbridge turns on SR 663, as that road joins SR 294, the Prince William Parkway, as it heads east. SR 612 terminates at an intersection with SR 294. Turning left goes toward Woodbridge, while turning right goes toward Manassas. When Yates Ford Road is two lanes, the speed limit is 40 mph (64 km/h). When Yates Ford Road is wider, the speed limit is 45 mph (72 km/h).

== History ==
=== Yates Ford ===
Yates Ford Road was known as early as 1716, for there are records that, on December 7, 1716, Lady Catherine Fairfax granted Wansford Arrington 335 acres (1.36 km^{2}). One of the boundaries was described as "land along Bull Run from just north of Yates Ford Road to south along Bull Run to a peninsula". A few years later, on September 12, 1730, Richard Kirtling, Jr. was granted 290 acres (1.2 km^{2}) by Lord Thomas Fairfax, and this land was described as running "from Popes Head Run to just north of Yates Ford Road".

Yates Ford also appears in Civil War history. According to Pennsylvania Cavalry. 3d Regt. William Brooke Rawle, Yates Ford was the scene of a battle (also known as the Battle of Occoquan). He describes Yates Ford as being "about a mile or so below the railroad bridge". Yates Ford can be found on the 1862 War Department Map, where its position is consistent with the present terminus of Birmingham Drive. http://www.davidrumsey.com/maps4020.html

The original Yates Ford appears to be between Yates Ford Road in Clifton, at Hemlock Regional Park, and Birmingham Drive on the Manassas Park / Prince William County border. Some of the old Yates Ford Road can still be seen on the Manassas side at the end of the easternmost end of Birmingham Drive, along the border of what is currently property owned by a rod and gun club, another property, and the river. The ford can also be found here by boating and repeatedly portaging along the river.

In 1997 the original 30-year-old bridge crossing Bull Run was replaced by the Virginia Department of Transportation.

There is another section of Yates Ford Road that is not a part of SR 612. It appears that this section is what led to the original Yates Ford before Hemlock Overlook Regional Park was created by the Northern Virginia Regional Park Authority. That section of Yates Ford Road is now a group of large single-family homes that are nestled against the boundary of the park.

=== Colchester Road ===
Colchester Road was originally a road leading from western Fairfax County through the Clifton area to the seaport of Colchester. Silt filled up the Occoquan River, making Colchester untenable as a seaport. The result for Colchester Road was that many different roads took its place, and the only part of Colchester Road left is the part in Fairfax / Clifton that is part of SR 612.

== Major intersections ==
County	Location	mi	km	Destinations	Notes
Fairfax	Clifton–Fairfax line	0.00	0.00	SR 620 (Braddock Road) – Fairfax, Centreville	Northern terminus of SR 612
Fairfax	Clifton–Fairfax line	2.54	4.09	SR 660 (Fairfax Station Road) – Fairfax Station	
Fairfax	Clifton–Fairfax line	3.93	6.32	SR 641 (Chapel Road) – Clifton	Northern end of SR 641 concurrency
Fairfax	Clifton–Fairfax line	4.27	6.87	SR 641 (Chapel Road) – Clifton	Southern end of SR 641 concurrency
Fairfax	Clifton	6.42	10.33	SR 645 (Clifton Road) – Clifton, Burke, Centreville	Northern end of SR 645 concurrency
Fairfax	Clifton	6.62	10.65	SR 645 (Clifton Road) – Clifton, Burke, Centreville	Southern end of SR 645 concurrency; northern end of SR 643 concurrency
Fairfax	Clifton	8.22	13.23	SR 643 (Henderson Road) – Clifton	Southern end of SR 643 concurrency
Prince William	Manassas	10.32	16.61	SR 663 east (Davis Ford Road) / SR 614 west (Evans Ford Road) – Woodbridge, Manassas	
Prince William	Manassas	11.41	18.36	SR 294 (Prince William Parkway) – Manassas	South terminus of SR 612
1.000 mi = 1.609 km; 1.000 km = 0.621 mi
