= Joyceville, Virginia =

Unincorporated community in Virginia, United States

Coordinates: 36°34′11″N 78°02′11″W

Joyceville is an unincorporated community located in Brunswick County, in the U.S. state of Virginia.
