= Byrdton, Virginia =

Unincorporated community in Virginia, US

Coordinates: 37°42′04″N 76°20′12″W

Byrdton is an unincorporated community in Northumberland County, in the U.S. state of Virginia.
