= James River Gorge =

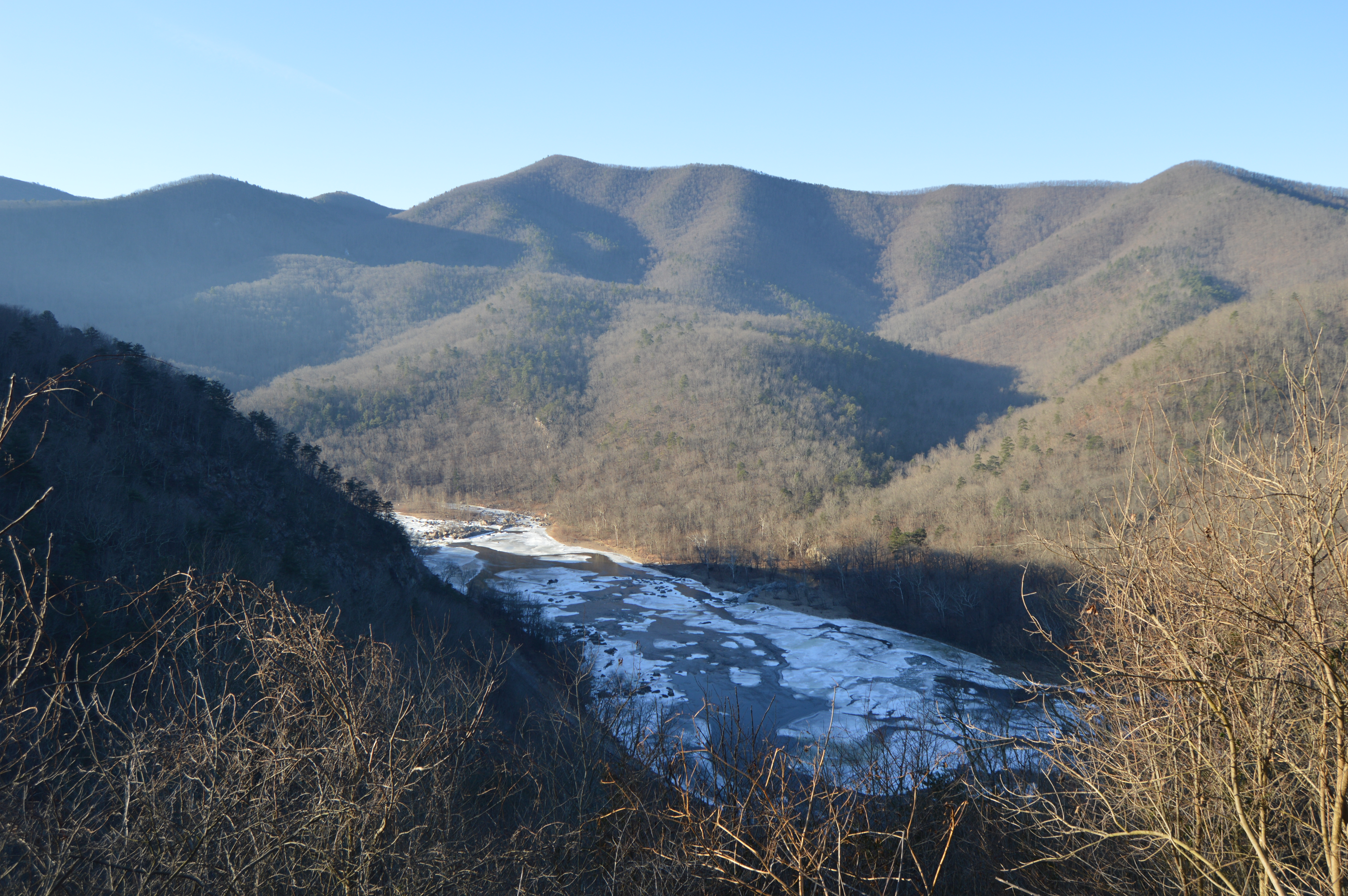
- Northwestern end, near Glasgow
- Floor elevation: 640–3,073 feet (195–937 m)

Geography
- Country: United States
- State: Virginia
- Region: Mid-Atlantic
- Coordinates: 37.6°N 79.4°W
- River: James River
- Interactive map of James River Gorge

The James River Gorge is a water gap created by the James River in Central Virginia. The Gorge is 2,433 feet (742 m) deep as measured from Highcock Knob 3,073 feet (937 m) to the James River 640 feet (200 m) and is approximately 9.3 miles (15.0 km) long. The James River forms in western Virginia near the border of West Virginia and initially flows south through the ridge and valley province of the Allegheny Mountains, turning northeast when it comes to the western edge of the Blue Ridge Mountains near Buchanan, Virginia. From Buchanan the river flows along the base of the Blue Ridge Mountains until it joins the Maury River near the town of Glasgow and then it turns southeast and begins its descent over the Balcony Falls rapids and through the James River Gorge. The rocks of the gorge are metamorphic in nature with the oldest exposed outcrops being from the Proterozoic Era. To the south of the river the peaks of the James River Face Wilderness dominate and to the north the peaks of Big Rocky Row and Little Rocky Row Mountains form a dramatic backdrop to the river far below. Multiple trails, including the Appalachian Trail go through the gorge and provide spectacular vistas of the scenery both at river level and from the peaks to the north and the south.
