= Verbena, Virginia =

Unincorporated community in Virginia, US

Coordinates: 38°27′55″N 78°36′58″W

Verbena is an unincorporated community in Page County, in the U.S. state of Virginia.
