= Chisford, Virginia =

Unincorporated community in Virginia, US

Coordinates: 38°08′34″N 76°48′00″W

Chisford is an unincorporated community in Westmoreland County, in the U. S. state of Virginia.
