= Berrys, Virginia =

Community in Virginia, United States

- Unincorporated community
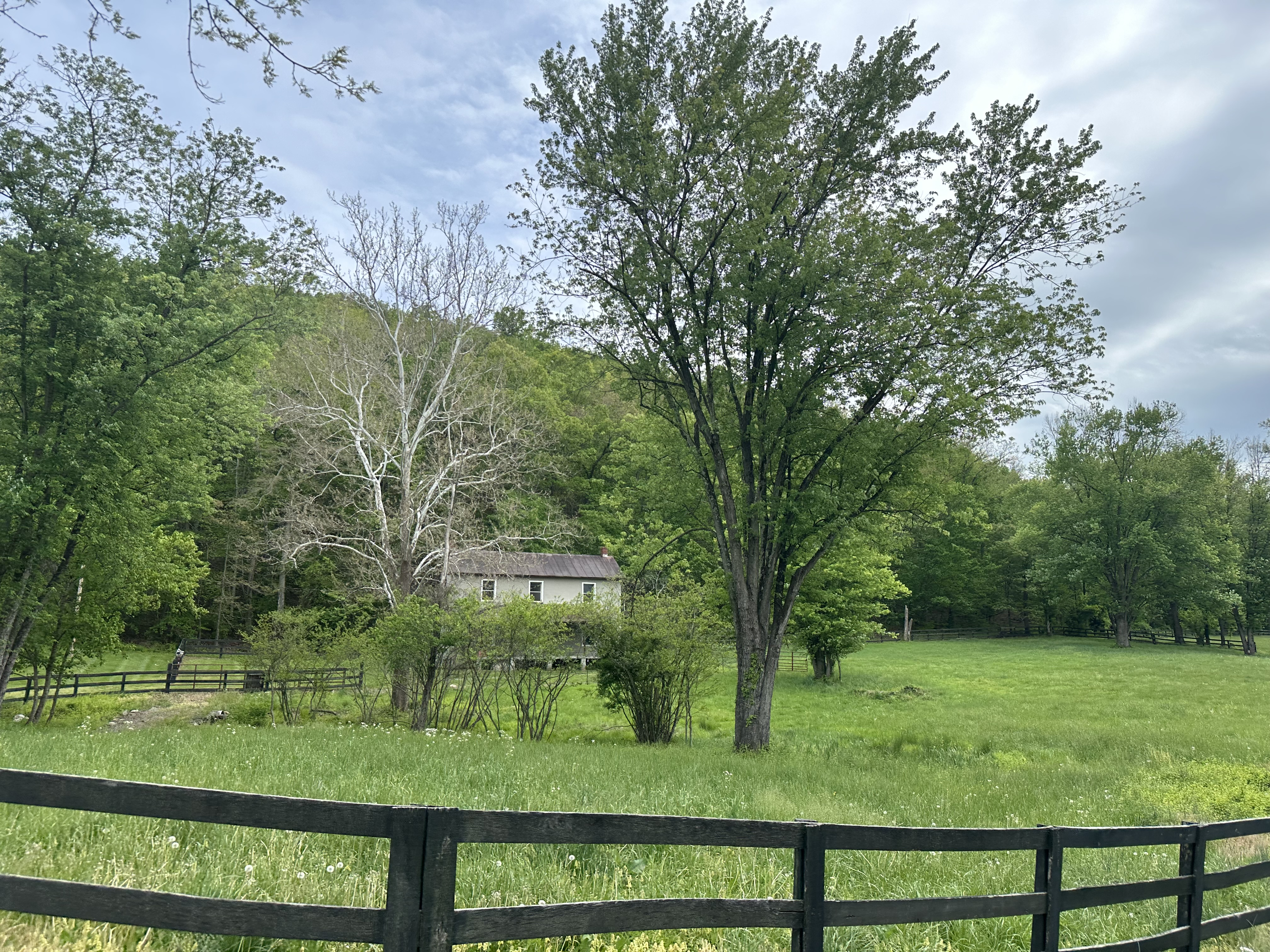
- House in Berrys, 2026

- Location within the Commonwealth of Virginia Berrys (Virginia) Berrys (the United States)
- Coordinates: 39°2′19″N 77°59′48″W
- Country: United States
- State: Virginia
- County: Clarke
- Time zone: UTC−5 (Eastern (EST))
  - Summer (DST): UTC−4 (EDT)

Berrys is an unincorporated community on the Shenandoah River in Clarke County, Virginia, United States. Berrys was originally known as Berry's Ferry for the ferry operated there. Today, Harry Flood Byrd Bridge spans the Shenandoah at Berrys carrying U.S. Route 50 and U.S. Route 17.

A white post in White Post, Virginia, was installed in 1750 by George Washington. The post, repeatedly destroyed and rebuilt, has featured signs pointing towards Berrys (under the name Berrys Ferry) and other nearby communities.
