= Port Haywood, Virginia =

Unincorporated community in Virginia, US

Coordinates: 37°23′09″N 76°19′02″W

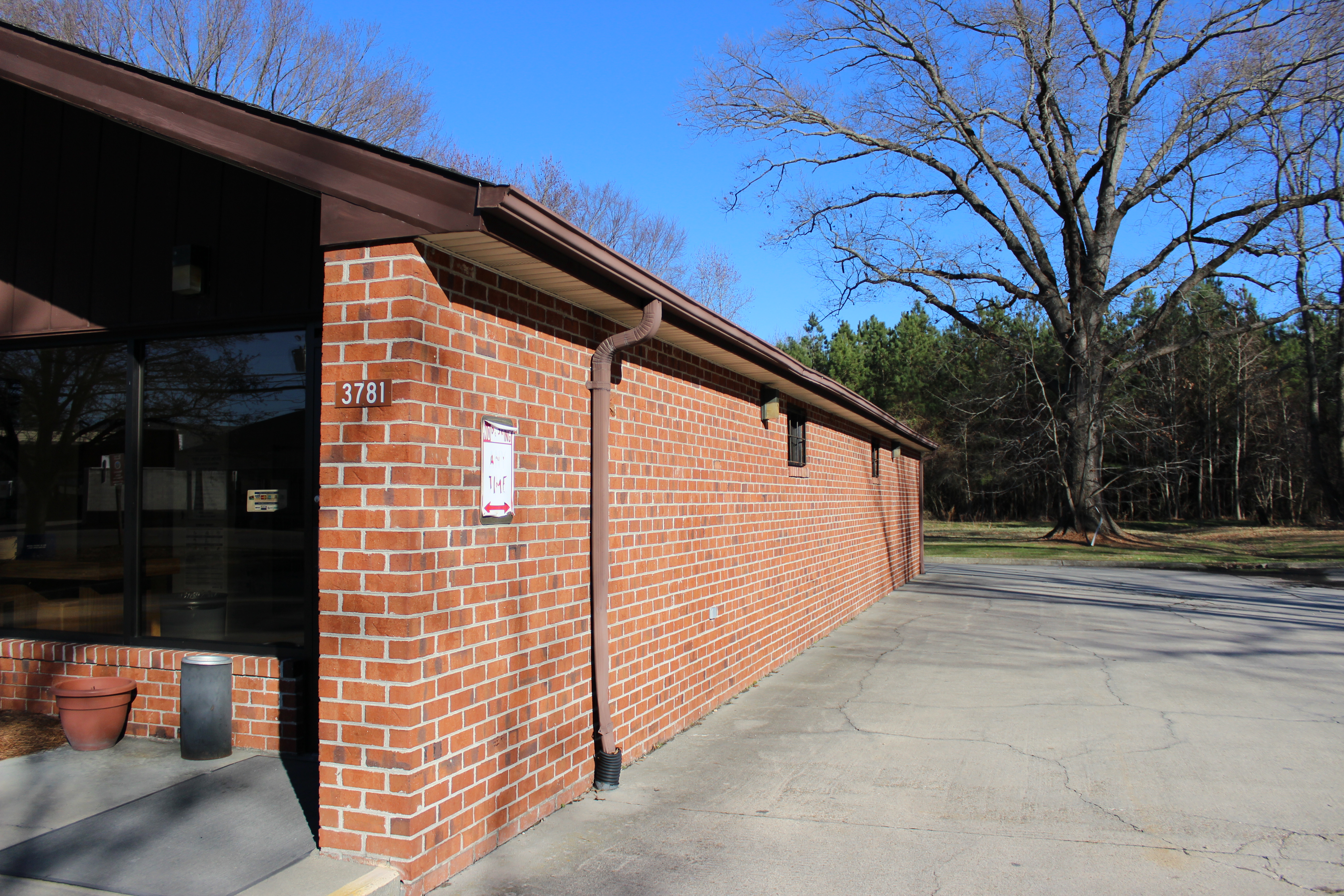
U.S. Post Office in Port Haywood.

Port Haywood is an unincorporated community in Mathews County, in the U. S. state of Virginia.

== History ==
In 1904, Port Haywood was a post village.
