= Saumsville, Virginia =

- CDP
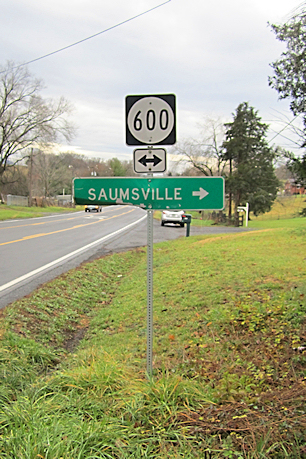

- Location in the state of Virginia
- Coordinates: 38°56′06″N 78°29′52″W
- Country: United States
- State: Virginia
- County: Shenandoah
- Elevation: 988 ft (301 m)
- Time zone: UTC−5 (Eastern (EST))
  - Summer (DST): UTC−4 (EDT)
- ZIP code: 22644
- Area code: 540
- GNIS feature ID: 2830690

Saumsville is a CDP in Shenandoah County, Virginia, United States. Saumsville is located approximately 3.7 miles (6.0 km) north of Woodstock and 8.4 miles (13.5 km) southwest of Strasburg.

== Demographics ==
Historical population
Census	Pop.	Note	%±

The United States Census Bureau defined Saumsville as a census designated place (CDP) in 2023.

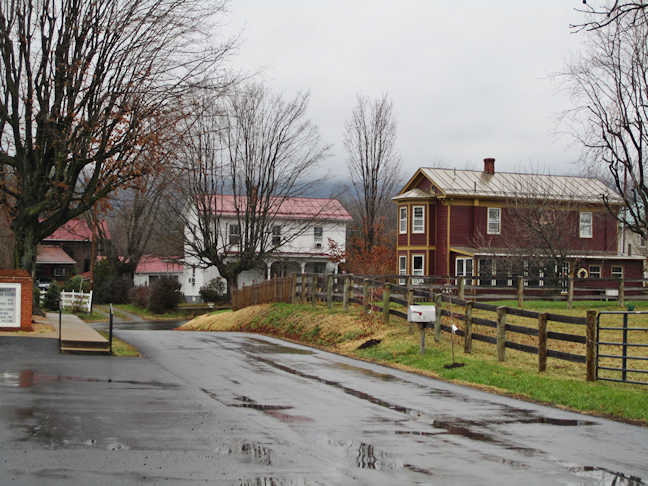
Downtown Saumsville
