= Isom, West Virginia =

Isom
- Unincorporated community
- Location within the state of West Virginia Isom (the United States)
- Coordinates: 37°56′37″N 81°52′13″W
- Country: United States
- State: West Virginia
- County: Logan
- Elevation: 883 ft (269 m)
- Time zone: UTC-5 (Eastern (EST))
  - Summer (DST): UTC-4 (EDT)
- GNIS ID: 1540748

Isom is an unincorporated community in Logan County, West Virginia.
