= USS William Isom =

History
- Name: 1917: William Isom; 1931: Edwin B. De Golia; 1948: Demosthenes
- Namesake: 1948: Demosthenes
- Owner: 1917: Sinclair Gulf Corp; 1921: American Italian Comm Corp; mid-1920s: Cuba Distilling Company; 1930: Edwin B. De Golia; 1931: Hillcone Steamship Company; 1948: Artemis Maritime Company
- Operator: As owners except 1918–19, when the US Navy operated her
- Port of registry: 1917: (United States) San Francisco; 1948: Panama City
- Builder: Baltimore Shipbuilding & DD Co
- Completed: November 1917
- Commissioned: into US Navy 1 May 1918
- Decommissioned: from US Navy 21 August 1919
- Identification: US official number 215654; Code letters LJBC (until 1933); Call sign WLCN (1934 onward)
- Fate: Scrapped 4 February 1955

General characteristics
- Type: Oil tanker
- Tonnage: 3,322 GRT, 2,032 NRT
- Displacement: 7,045 tons
- Length: 292.3 ft (89.1 m) p/p
- Beam: 47.2 ft (14.4 m)
- Draft: 23 ft 0 in (7.01 m) (aft)
- Depth: 26.9 ft (8.2 m)
- Installed power: 241 NHP
- Propulsion: 2 × steam turbines, 1 × screw
- Speed: 10.5 knots (19.4 km/h)
- Crew: 44
- Sensors & processing systems: echo sounding device (by 1935)
- Armament: in US Navy: 1 × 5-inch (130 mm) gun; 1 × 3-inch (76 mm) gun

USS William Isom (ID-1555) was an oil tanker that was built in 1917 and briefly served in the United States Navy. She spent three decades in the United States Merchant Marine. In 1931 she was renamed Edwin B. De Golia.

In 1947 or 1948 she was sold to a company that renamed her Demosthenes and flagged her out to Panama. She was scrapped in 1955.

== Building ==
The Baltimore Shipbuilding and Dry Dock Company built William Isom for the Sinclair Gulf Corporation in 1917, completing her that November. She was named after a Vice President of the North American Transportation and Trading Company.

William Isom's main engines were two steam turbines, which drove her single propeller shaft by single-deduction gearing. She had two water-tube boilers, made by W. & A. Fletcher Company of Hoboken, New Jersey.

== US Navy service ==
On 24 April 1918 the United States Shipping Board took control of William Isom. On 1 May the US Navy took her over, gave her the naval registry Identification Number 1555 and commissioned her as USS William Isom. Her first commander was Lt Cdr Wenzel Habel, USNRF.

William Isom was assigned first to the Naval Overseas Transportation Service. By 1 July 1918 she had been transferred to the Fleet Train as a depot tanker, carrying bunker oil to US ships and stations. She seems to have remained in US home waters throughout her 15 months of naval service.

On 21 August 1919 William Isom was decommissioned and returned via the US Shipping Board to the Sinclair Gulf Corporation.

== Further civilian service ==
The American Italian Commercial Corporation bought William Isom in 1920, and sold her in the mid-1920s to the Cuba Distilling Company. In 1930 Edwin B. De Golia bought her and renamed her Edwin B. De Golia. From 1931 her owner is listed as the Hillcone Steamship Company.

Despite her change of name, Edwin B. De Golia seems to have kept the same code letters LJBC until 1933. In 1934 they were superseded by the call sign WLCN.

By 1935 Edwin B. De Golia was equipped with wireless direction finding.

In 1947 the Artemis Maritime Company bought Edwin B. De Golia, renamed her Demosthenes and registered her in Panama City. She was scrapped on 4 February 1955 in Trieste.
