= Bartlick, Virginia =

Unincorporated community in Virginia, United States

Coordinates: 37°14′49″N 82°19′29″W

Bartlick is an unincorporated community in Dickenson County, Virginia, United States.

== Etymology ==
Bartlick was so named by compounding the name of resident Bartley Belcher with the salt licks found in the area.
