= Columbia Furnace, Virginia =

Unincorporated community in Virginia, U.S.

Coordinates: 38°52′34″N 78°37′32″W

Columbia Furnace is an unincorporated community in Shenandoah County, in the U.S. state of Virginia.
