= Waddeys, Virginia =

Unincorporated community in Virginia, US

Coordinates: 37°47′04″N 76°21′23″W

Waddeys is an unincorporated community in Northumberland County, in the U.S. state of Virginia.
