= Briggs, Virginia =

Unincorporated community in Virginia, United States

- Unincorporated community
- Location within the Commonwealth of Virginia Briggs (Virginia) Briggs (the United States)
- Coordinates: 39°6′28″N 78°0′50″W
- Country: United States
- State: Virginia
- County: Clarke
- Time zone: UTC−5 (Eastern (EST))
  - Summer (DST): UTC−4 (EDT)

Briggs is an unincorporated community in Clarke County, Virginia, United States. Briggs is located on Lord Fairfax Highway (U.S. Route 340).

== Etymology ==
According to the Geographic Names Information System, Briggs was formerly known as Old Chapel.

== Features ==
The Old Chapel and its cemetery are located at the center of Briggs, it is home to the graves of the Burwell, Meade, Page and Randolph families, among others. U.S. Route 340, Virginia State Route 255 (Bishop Meade Highway), Lanham Lane, and Briggs Road are located in Briggs.
