= Strom, Virginia =

Unincorporated community in Virginia, United States

Strom
- Unincorporated community
- Location within the Commonwealth of Virginia Strom (the United States)
- Coordinates: 37°41′30″N 79°53′24″W
- Country: United States
- State: Virginia
- County: Botetourt
- Time zone: UTC−5 (Eastern (EST))
  - Summer (DST): UTC−4 (EDT)

Strom is an unincorporated community in Botetourt County, Virginia, United States. Although there are no landmarks or signs, Strom is located in the area of what is now Roaring Run Grocery, a convenience store located across the road from Craig Creek. The entrance to the former site of Willow Bend Campground is located approximately one-half mile to the west. The Deisher family is one of the earliest families to settle in the area. Eagle Rock, located approximately five miles to the east, is the nearest town.
