= Lori L. Isom =

American pharmacologist

- Education: Washington University in St. Louis; Vanderbilt University
- Scientific career
- Fields: Pharmacology
- Workplaces: University of Michigan

Lori L. Isom is an American pharmacologist, an elected Fellow of the American Association for the Advancement of Science, and a member of the National Academy of Medicine.

== Biography ==
Isom was raised in Oshkosh, Wisconsin. She received her BA from Washington University in St. Louis in 1982 and her PhD in Pharmacology from Vanderbilt University in 1987. She completed her postdoctoral fellowship in 1993 at the University of Washington in the Catterall lab. Currently, she serves as the chair of the Department of Pharmacology at the University of Michigan, as well as a Professor of Molecular and Integrative Physiology and Professor of Neurology.

== Research ==
Her research has focused on the physiology and pharmacology of voltage-gated sodium channels and the role of sodium channel mutations in epilepsy, cardiac arrhythmia, and demyelinating disease. She has played a critical role in using translational research to model and find treatment for a rare form of infantile epilepsy known as Dravet syndrome (DS) that increases risk for Sudden Unexpected Death in Epilepsy (SUDEP). The syndrome has been linked to loss of function mutations in the SCN1A gene that causes an improper folding of Na_{V}1.1 channels in GABAergic interneurons. Decreased excitation of GABA interneurons can lead to neuronal hyper-excitability and seizures as well as cardiac arrhythmias. Dr. Isom’s lab has published over 90 articles and received $22 million in funding to investigate genetic links between neuronal excitability and epileptic encephalopathy.

== Awards and honors ==
- Elected AAAS Fellow (Neuroscience), 2011
- University of Michigan Distinguished Faculty Award, 2009
- Distinguished Alumni Lecturer, University of Washington Department of Pharmacology, 2009
- National Academy of Medicine

== Recent Publications ==
- Isom L (2019). "Is Targeting of Compensatory Ion Channel Gene Expression a Viable Therapeutic Strategy for Dravet Syndrome?". Epilepsy Currents. 19 (3): 193–195. doi:10.1177/1535759719844780. PMC 6610383. PMID 31035820.
- Yuan Y, O'Malley H, Smaldino M, Bouza A, Hull J, Isom L (2019). "Delayed maturation of GABAergic signaling in the Scn1a and Scn1b mouse models of Dravet Syndrome". Scientific Reports. 9 (1) 6210: 6201. Bibcode:2019NatSR...9.6210Y. doi:10.1038/s41598-019-42191-0. PMC 6470170. PMID 30996233.
- Lukowski A, Denomme N, Hinze M, Hall S, Isom L, Narayan A (2019). "Biocatalytic Detoxification of Paralytic Shellfish Toxins". ACS Chemical Biology. 14 (5): 941–948. doi:10.1021/acschembio.9b00123. PMC 6528162. PMID 30983320.
- Lopez-Santiago L, Isom L (2019). "Dravet Syndrome: A Developmental and Epileptic Encephalopathy". Epilepsy Currents. 19 (1): 51–53. doi:10.1177/1535759718822038. PMC 6610375. PMID 30838929.
- Fraiser C, Zhang H, Offord J, Dang L, Auerbach D, Shi H, Chen C, Goldman A, Eckhardt L, Bezzerides V, Parent J, Isom L (2018). "Channelopathy as a SUDEP Biomarker in Dravet Syndrome Patient-Derived Cardiac Myocytes". Stem Cell Reports. 11 (3): 626–634. doi:10.1016/j.stemcr.2018.07.012. PMC 6135724. PMID 30146492.
- Chen C, Holth J, Bunton-Stasyshyn R, Anumonwo C, Meisler M, Noebels J, Isom L (2018). "Mapt deletion fails to rescue premature lethality in two models of sodium channel epilepsy". Annals of Clinical and Translational Neurology. 5 (8): 982–987. doi:10.1002/acn3.599. PMC 6093838. PMID 30128323.
