= Blowing Rock, Virginia =

Unincorporated community in Virginia, United States

Coordinates: 37°13′35″N 82°25′51″W

Blowing Rock is an unincorporated community in Dickenson County, Virginia, United States.

== History ==
Blowing Rock was named from a rock which will blow debris in windy conditions.
