= Isom, Virginia =

Unincorporated community in Virginia, United States

Coordinates: 37°11′13″N 82°27′43″W

Isom is an unincorporated community in Dickenson County, Virginia, United States.

== History ==
A post office was established at Isom in 1905, and remained in operation until it was discontinued in 1959. The community was named for Isom Mullins, a pioneer.
