= Pimmit Run =

Stream in Fairfax County, Virginia, United States

Coordinates: 38.929041°N 77.116416°W

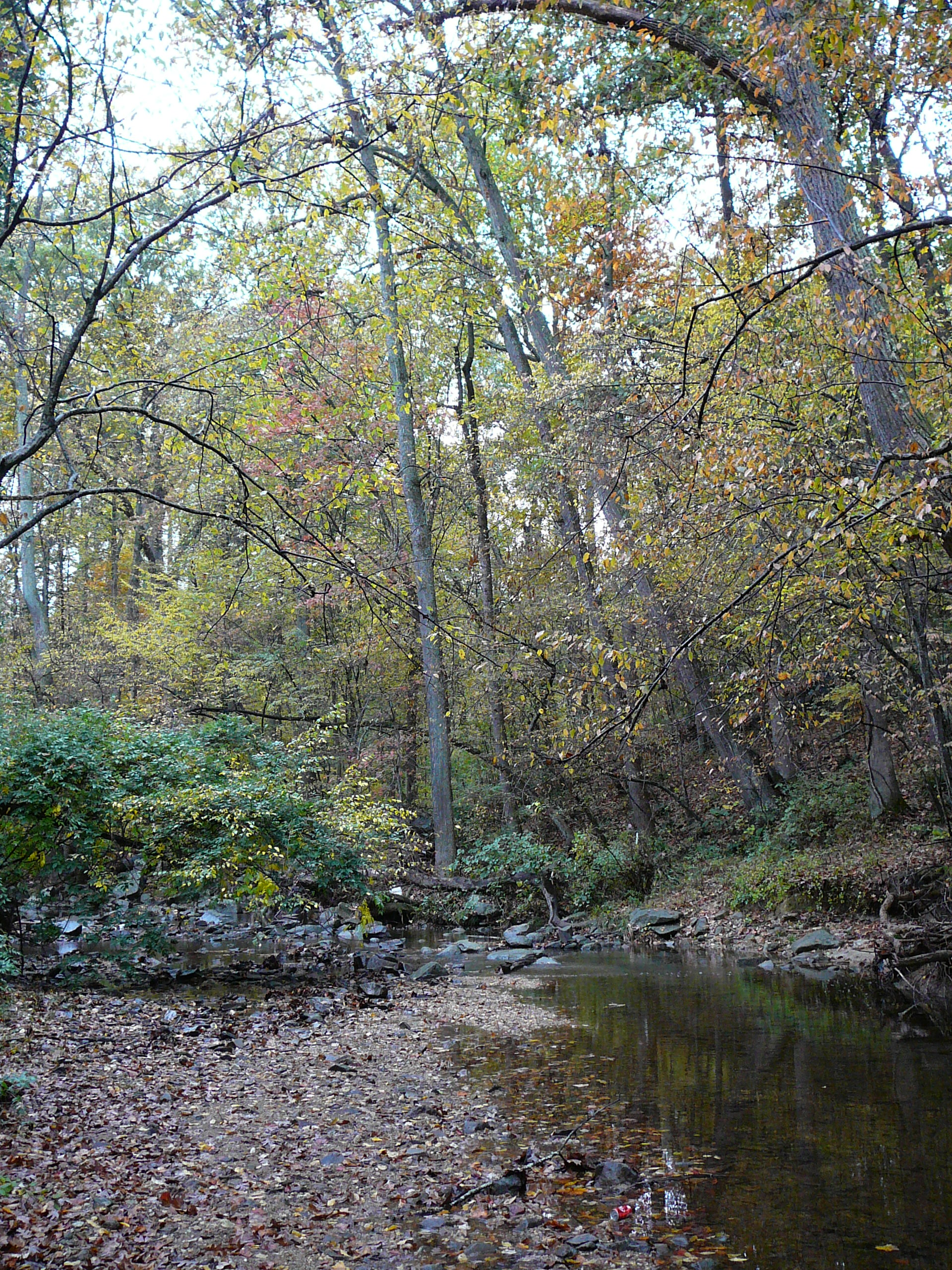
Pimmit Run in fall

Pimmit Run is a 7.8-mile-long (12.6 km) stream in northern Virginia that runs from Fairfax County to the Potomac River at Chain Bridge in the Arlingwood neighborhood of Arlington.

== Description ==
Pimmit Run forms south of Leesburg Pike (State Route 7), in Idylwood, Virginia, near George C. Marshall High School. The run flows underground until it crosses Leesburg Pike, then flows openly past Pimmit Hills. Originally, the part of the run south of Leesburg Pike flowed above ground as well, but development gradually forced it underground. The portion of the stream that borders Pimmit Hills was widened and lined with concrete in the early 1970s to prevent flooding.

From Pimmit Hills, Pimmit Run flows northeast through Pimmit Run Stream Valley Park and then under the Dulles Toll Road into Devon Park and Chesterbrook Gardens neighborhoods. Pimmit Run continues on its northeastern course meandering through Pimmit Run Stream Valley Park. At Westmont, the stream is joined by Little Pimmit Run before paralleling the George Washington Memorial Parkway and flowing southeast into Arlington. The stream parallels Chain Bridge Road as it bisects the Arlington Bluff and empties into the Potomac just downstream of the bridge.

The stream was named for John Pimmit, who in 1675 was an overseer for William Fitzhugh (1651–1701). Pimmit was naturalized a citizen in 1679. He died by drowning in February 1688, on the Potomac River, near the mouth of the stream which was named after him.

== Park information ==
Pimmit Run is a Fairfax County Park Authority Stream Valley, meaning visitors of the park are required to follow rules established by the Fairfax County Park Authority. These rules include:

- No Motorized Vehicles (dirt bikes, ATV's, UTV's, etc.)
- Park Closed at Dark
- No Alcoholic Beverages (Any alcoholic beverage in any container is strictly prohibited)
- Pets Must Be on a Leash and Handlers Must "Scoop the Poop"
- No Camping (With the exception of parties of 2 or less) or Open Fires (Controlled, small, campfires are permitted as long as they are handled properly)
- No Dumping or Littering
- No Golfing

== Tributaries ==
Pimmit Run's named tributaries are listed from its headwaters to its mouth.

- Bridge Branch
- Burke's Spring Branch
- Saucy Branch
- Bryan Branch
- Little Pimmit Run
- Stromans Branch

According to the Geographic Names Information System, Pimmit Run has also been known by the following names.

- Pimmet's Run
- Catfish Run
- Upper Spout Run

== See also ==
- List of rivers of Virginia
