= West Falls Church, Virginia =

- Census-designated place (CDP)
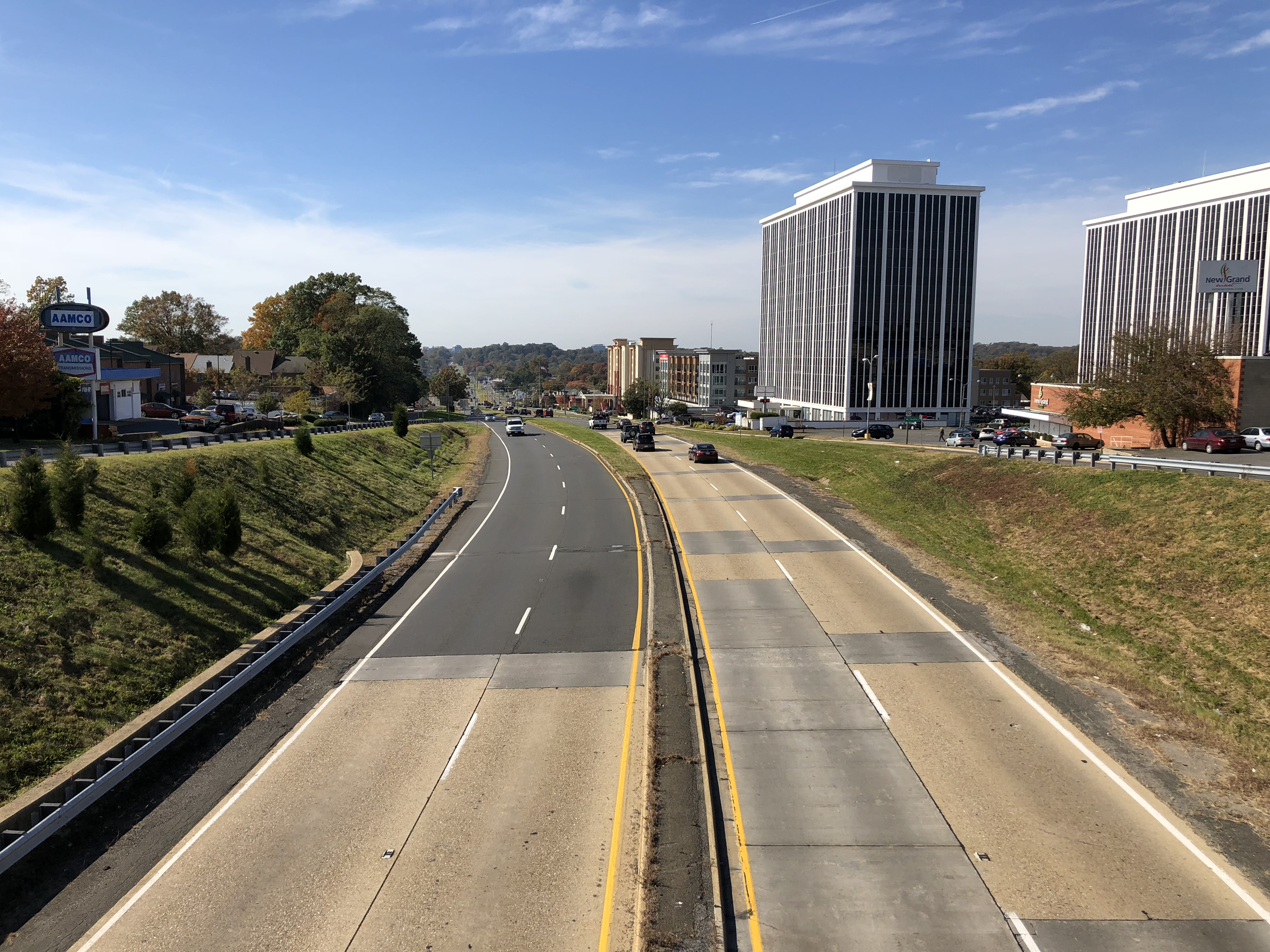
- Arlington Boulevard, the main highway passing directly through West Falls Church

- Location of West Falls Church in Fairfax County, Virginia

- Location within Northern Virginia Location within Virginia Location within the United States
- Coordinates: 38°51′56″N 77°11′16″W
- Country: United States
- State: Virginia
- County: Fairfax

Area
  - Total: 5.0 sq mi (13.0 km^{2})
  - Land: 5.0 sq mi (12.9 km^{2})
  - Water: 0.039 sq mi (0.1 km^{2})
- Elevation: 331 ft (101 m)

Population (2020)
  - Total: 30,243
  - Density: 6,070/sq mi (2,340/km^{2})
- Time zone: UTC−5 (Eastern (EST))
  - Summer (DST): UTC−4 (EDT)
- FIPS code: 51-84366
- GNIS feature ID: 2389981

West Falls Church is a census-designated place (CDP) in Fairfax County, Virginia, United States. As of the 2020 census, West Falls Church had a population of 30,243. Before 2010, West Falls Church was officially named Jefferson (from Thomas Jefferson). Outside of the Jefferson Village neighborhood, "Jefferson" generally is not used locally to refer to the area bounding Falls Church city to the south and southwest that comprises the CDP. Likewise, "West Falls Church" is rarely used to describe the area but is usually applied to areas west of Falls Church city or near West Falls Church metro station. The bulk of it is made of subdivisions built in the 1940s and early 1950s, including Jefferson Village, Westlawn, Hillwood, Sleepy Hollow, Woodley, Raymondale and Broyhill Park.

== History ==
Following the American Civil War, local African-Americans established prosperous communities in an area then called South Falls Church, along Tinner's Hill and elsewhere. In 1887, white Falls Church residents gerrymandered heavily black South Falls Church out of the town limits and shrank the area of the town by one third. It is speculated that the reason for the shrinking of the town limits was a fear of black power to swing local elections. This was never reversed, and caused the boundary of the future City of Falls Church to follow South Washington Street. The name South Falls Church subsequently fell out of use.

Before 2010, the West Falls Church CDP was officially named Jefferson but that name was rarely used for the area. As the CDP does not lie to the immediate west of Falls Church city, "West Falls Church" is also an uncommon designation for the area and more often refers to the area around West Falls Church station several miles away in the Idylwood CDP.

== Geography ==
West Falls Church is located at 38°51′56″N 77°11′16″W (38.8655595, −77.1876993).

According to the United States Census Bureau, the CDP has a total area of 5.03 square miles (13.0 km^{2}), of which 4.99 square miles (12.9 km^{2}) is land and 0.04 square mile (0.1 km^{2}) (0.77%) is water.

== Demographics ==
Historical population
Census	Pop.	Note	%±
1970	25,432		—
1980	24,342		−4.3%
1990	25,782		5.9%
2000	27,422		6.4%
2010	29,207		6.5%
2020	30,243		3.5%
source: Ubder the name Jefferson prior to the 2010 Census

=== Racial and ethnic composition ===
West Falls Church CDP, Virginia – Racial and ethnic composition Note: the US Census treats Hispanic/Latino as an ethnic category. This table excludes Latinos from the racial categories and assigns them to a separate category. Hispanics/Latinos may be of any race.
Race / Ethnicity (NH = Non-Hispanic)	Pop 2000	Pop 2010	Pop 2020	% 2000	% 2010	% 2020
White alone (NH)	13,981	11,918	11,728	50.98%	40.81%	38.78%
Black or African American alone (NH)	1,180	1,317	1,282	4.30%	4.51%	4.24%
Native American or Alaska Native alone (NH)	55	41	40	0.20%	0.14%	0.13%
Asian alone (NH)	5,228	5,521	5,517	19.06%	18.90%	18.24%
Native Hawaiian or Pacific Islander alone (NH)	7	4	12	0.03%	0.01%	0.04%
Other race alone (NH)	48	83	220	0.18%	0.28%	0.73%
Mixed race or Multiracial (NH)	572	644	1,104	2.09%	2.20%	3.65%
Hispanic or Latino (any race)	6,351	9,679	10,340	23.16%	33.14%	34.19%
Total	27,422	29,207	30,243	100.00%	100.00%	100.00%

=== 2020 census ===
As of the 2020 census, West Falls Church had a population of 30,243. The median age was 36.2 years. 22.3% of residents were under the age of 18 and 12.3% of residents were 65 years of age or older. For every 100 females there were 100.4 males, and for every 100 females age 18 and over there were 99.1 males age 18 and over.

100.0% of residents lived in urban areas, while 0.0% lived in rural areas.

There were 10,464 households in West Falls Church, of which 34.7% had children under the age of 18 living in them. Of all households, 51.2% were married-couple households, 17.1% were households with a male householder and no spouse or partner present, and 24.6% were households with a female householder and no spouse or partner present. About 22.1% of all households were made up of individuals and 7.6% had someone living alone who was 65 years of age or older.

There were 10,799 housing units, of which 3.1% were vacant. The homeowner vacancy rate was 0.8% and the rental vacancy rate was 3.0%.

Racial composition as of the 2020 census
Race	Number	Percent
White	12,874	42.6%
Black or African American	1,326	4.4%
American Indian and Alaska Native	359	1.2%
Asian	5,544	18.3%
Native Hawaiian and Other Pacific Islander	12	0.0%
Some other race	6,165	20.4%
Two or more races	3,963	13.1%
Hispanic or Latino (of any race)	10,340	34.2%

=== 2000 census ===
At the 2000 census there were 27,422 people, 10,016 households, and 6,470 families in the CDP. The population density was 5,424.6 inhabitants per square mile (2,094.4/km^{2}). There were 10,227 housing units at an average density of 2,023.1 per square mile (781.1/km^{2}). The racial makeup of the CDP was 61.35% White, 4.54% African American, 0.34% Native American, 19.16% Asian, 0.03% Pacific Islander, 10.56% from other races, and 4.03% from two or more races. Hispanic or Latino of any race were 23.16%.

When compared to other states, Virginia has a relatively high number of residents that were born in Bolivia, and West Falls Church has a population of 3,226 Bolivian Americans, which means West Falls Church is the 5th largest community of Bolivians in the United States. Of the 10,016 households 29.5% had children under the age of 18 living with them, 50.8% were married couples living together, 9.4% had a female householder with no husband present, and 35.4% were non-families. 25.8% of households were one person and 6.4% were one person aged 65 or older. The average household size was 2.74 and the average family size was 3.30.

The age distribution was 21.7% under the age of 18, 8.5% from 18 to 24, 38.2% from 25 to 44, 22.5% from 45 to 64, and 9.0% 65 or older. The median age was 35 years. For every 100 females, there were 100.9 males. For every 100 females age 18 and over, there were 99.6 males.

The median household income was $66,445 and the median family income was $72,682 (these figures had risen to $100,471 and $103,932 respectively as of a 2017 estimate). Males had a median income of $42,776 versus $37,416 for females. The per capita income for the CDP was $28,705. About 3.5% of families and 4.8% of the population were below the poverty line, including 6.3% of those under age 18 and 3.1% of those age 65 or over.

== Economy ==
HITT Contracting and Northrop Grumman have their corporate headquarters in West Falls Church.

The Defense Health Agency is headquartered in West Falls Church.

== Education ==
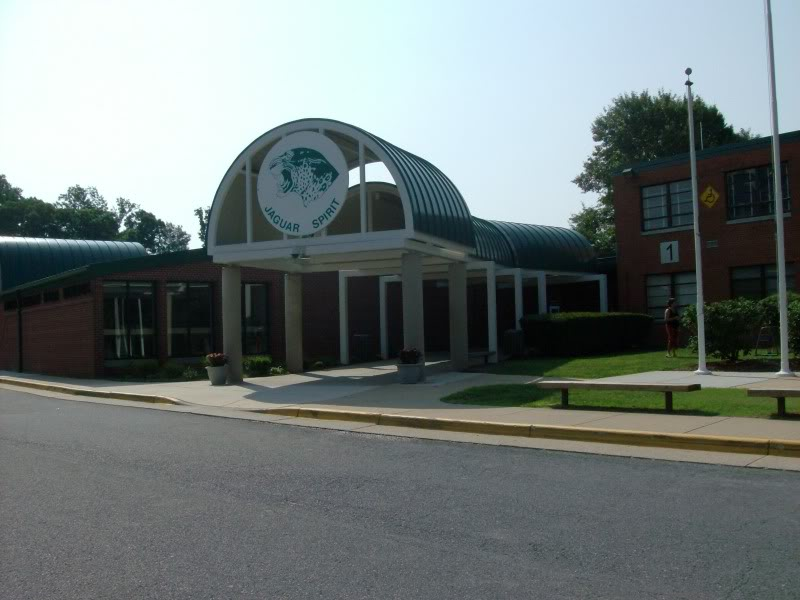
Falls Church High School

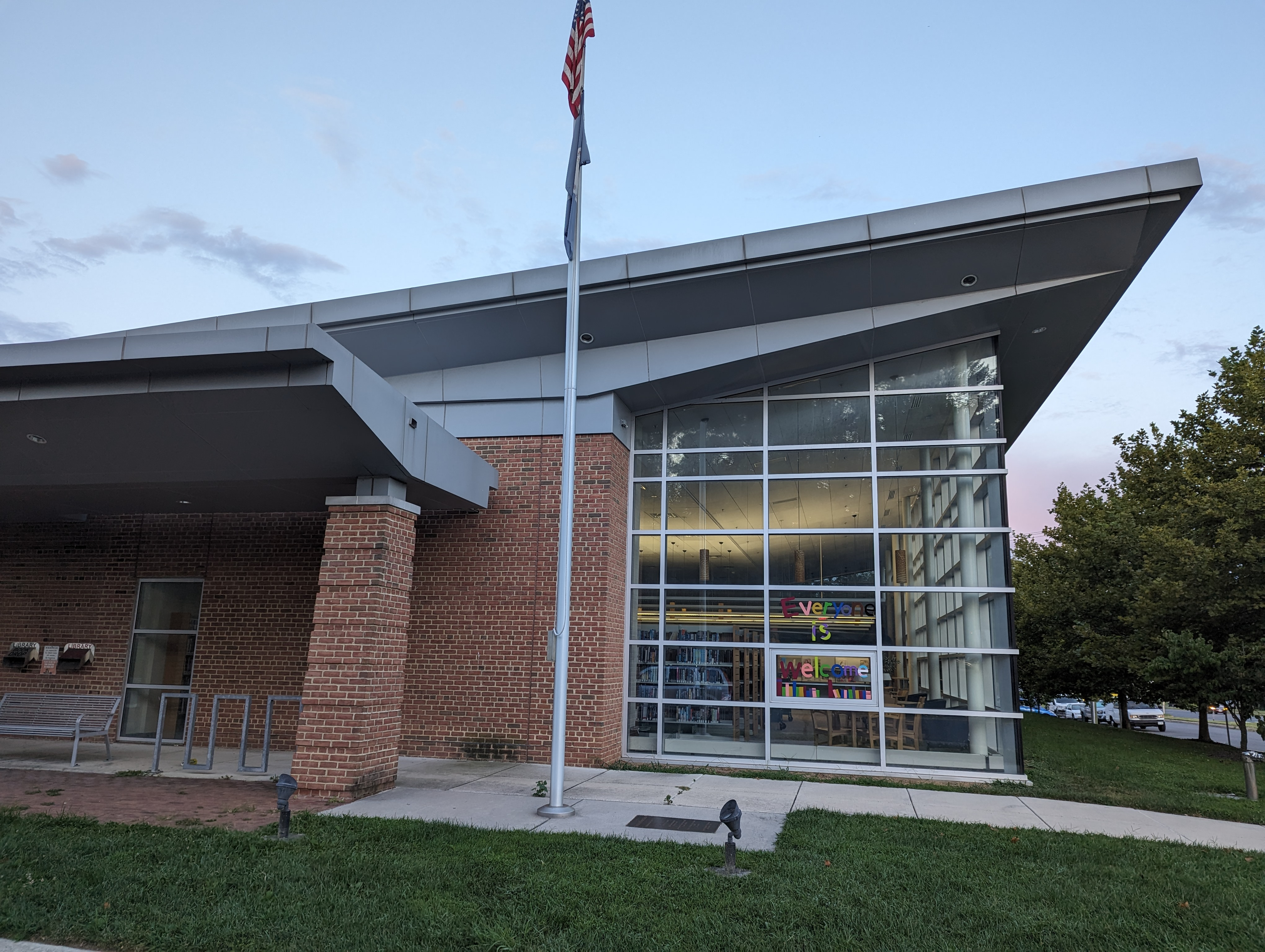
Thomas Jefferson community library

Fairfax County Public Schools operates public schools. Falls Church High School is located in West Falls Church CDP.

Fairfax County Public Library operates the Thomas Jefferson Library in the CDP.
