= M.C. Dean, Inc. =

Engineering firm

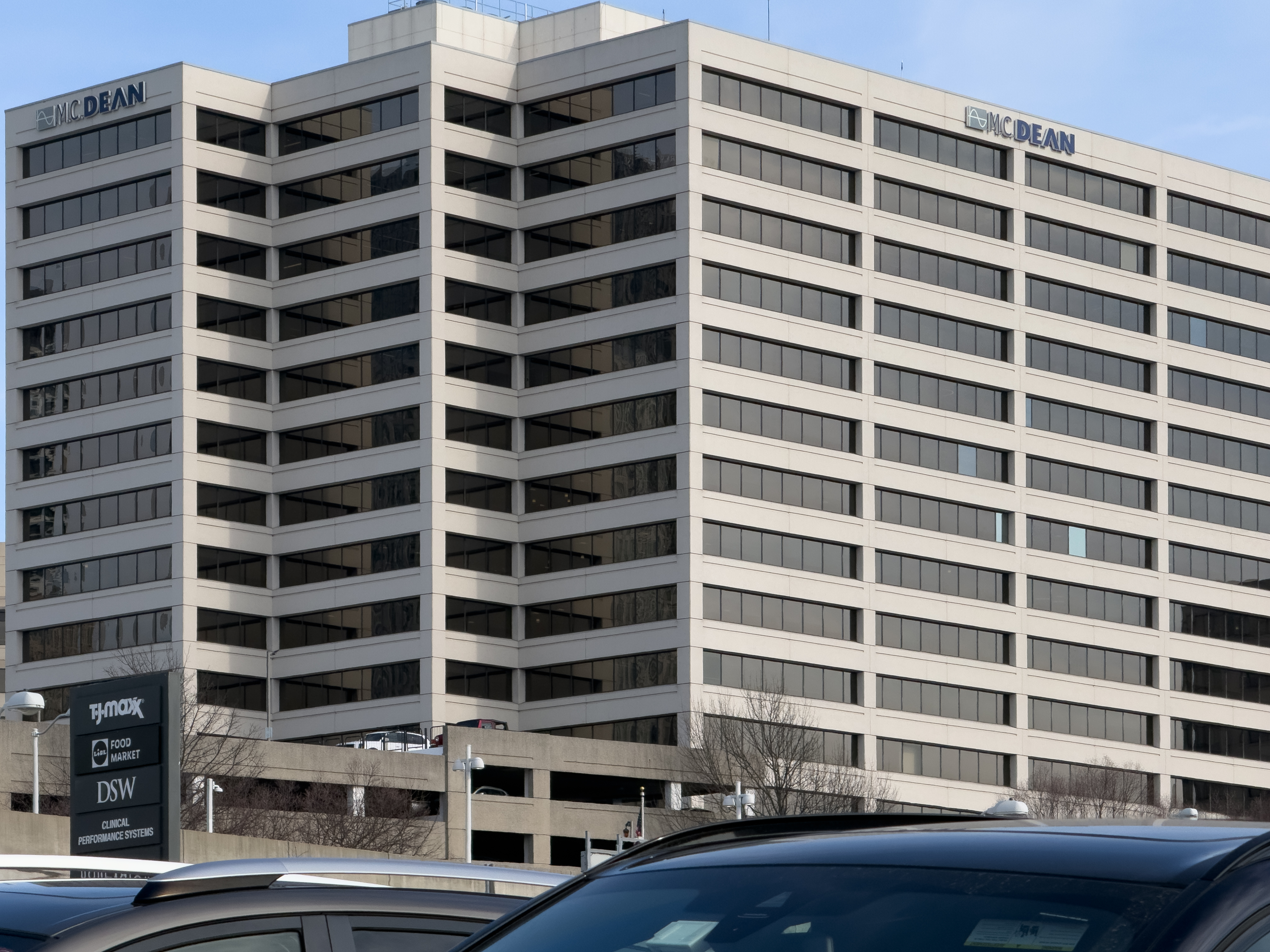
- Headquarters in Tysons Corner, VA
- Type: Family-owned
- Industry: Integrated Systems, Design-Build, Engineering
- Founded: 1949
- Founder: Marion Caleb Dean
- Headquarters: Tysons Corner, VA, United States
- Key people: Bill Dean,
- Services: Critical power, life safety, telecommunications, security systems
- Revenue: $1.3 Billion in 2021
- Owner: Family owned
- Number of employees: 5,800
- Subsidiaries: OpenBand, Aneco Electrical Construction, U.S. Electrical Testing
- Website: MCDean.com

M.C. Dean, Inc. is a design-build and systems integration corporation for complex, mission-critical organizations. Started in 1949 as a small electrical firm, it has since grown to 5,800 employees and a revenue of approximately $1.3 Billion. It’s headquartered in Tysons, Virginia, United States, and has over 30 other offices, including branches in Atlanta, Georgia; Baltimore, Maryland; Tampa, Florida; Charleston, South Carolina; Stuttgart, Germany; and Dallas, Texas.

== History ==
After serving in the United States Navy during World War II and working in the Newport News Naval Ship Yard as an electrician, Marion C. (M.C.) Dean returned to his roots in Washington, D.C. to start the firm. By the 1950s, the firm's roster of clients included the Ronald Reagan Washington National Airport, Bolling Air Force Base, and the Naval Research Laboratory. The firm illuminated some of Washington's most recognized monuments, including the Washington Monument, the Tomb of the Unknown Soldier and the United States Marine Corps Memorial

In 1952, the firm created a non-union electrical apprenticeship program which continues to operate today as the largest of its kind in the Mid-Atlantic region. The apprenticeship's flagship program runs out of Washington DC's famed Cardozo High School.

M.C. retired from the firm in 1980 and was succeeded by his son, Casey Dean. In 1997, Mr. Dean's grandson, Bill Dean, assumed the position of President and CEO. He led the company towards the design-build delivery method, where a single source has absolute responsibility for both design and construction of a project. The company started to bid on and team up with other design-build forerunners such as Hensel Phelps Construction and Clark Construction to win more ambitious projects, such as the U.S. Department of Defense's Washington Headquarters/Fort Belvoir project, and expanded operations to include prefabrication of materials, along with sponsoring the Solar Decathlon. In 2011, M.C. Dean, Inc. was ranked as the second-largest electrical contractor in the United States. In 2013, M.C. Dean agreed to pay $875,000 in back wages and interest to 381 African-American, Hispanic and Asian job applicants the Department of Labor claims were denied "equal employment opportunity" by M.C. Dean.

== Major projects ==
- The Phoenix Project (Washington, DC), United States Department of Defense
- Space and Naval Warfare Systems Command technical support services and command and control engineering (Charleston, South Carolina)
- Combined Forces Joint Operations Center (Kabul, Afghanistan)
- Metropolitan Atlanta Rapid Transit Authority (MARTA) (Atlanta, Georgia)
- United States European Command Headquarters (Stuttgart, Germany)
- Washington Dulles International Airport (Dulles, Virginia)
- H Street NE/Benning Road Line of the DC Streetcar Project (Washington, DC)

== Rankings ==
- #2 – Top Electrical Contractors, Electrical Construction & Maintenance
- #2 – Top Electrical Contractors, Engineering News Record
- #9 – Top Specialty Contractors, Engineering News Record
- #11 – Private Companies (in Washington DC) Washington Business Journal
- #42 – Fastest Growing Companies, Washington Business Journal
- #47 – Defense News Top 100, Defense News

== Subsidiaries and acquisitions ==
- OpenBand (1998)
- Aneco Electrical Construction (2004)
- CIM
- Tibs Group (2004)
- U.S. Electrical Testing (2021)
- Energy Conservation Systems Inc. (IEC Systems) (2023)

== See also ==
- Design-build
- Electrical contractor
- Engineering News-Record
- Government contractor
