= Fairfax County Public Library =

Public library system serving Fairfax County, Virginia, USA

- Location: Fairfax County, Virginia, US
- Established: 1939; 87 years ago
- Branches: 23

Collection
- Size: nearly three million items

Access and use
- Population served: 1,142,234

Other information
- Director: Eric Carzon
- Website: www.fairfaxcounty.gov/library/

Drive-thru window of the Burke Center branch library

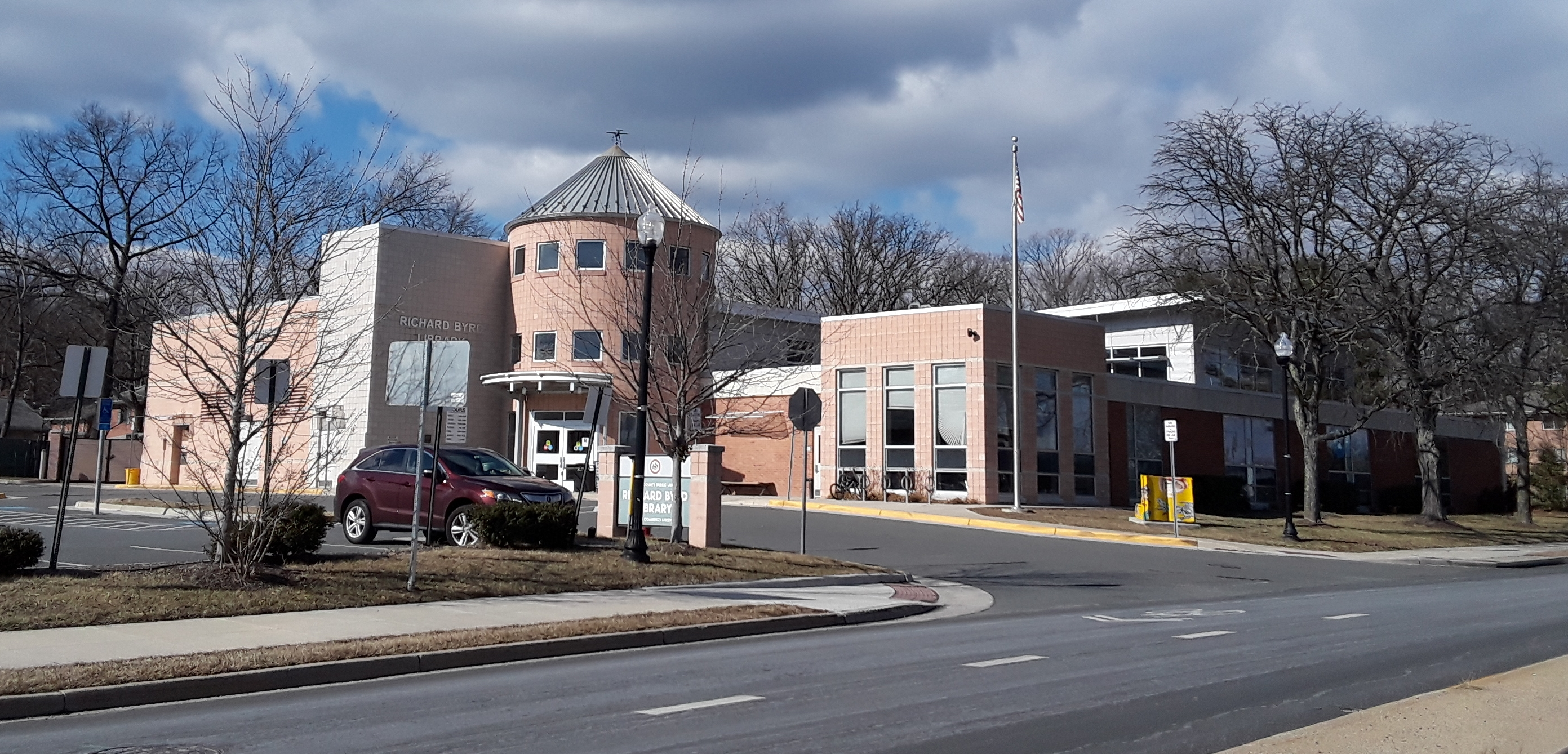
Richard Byrd branch library

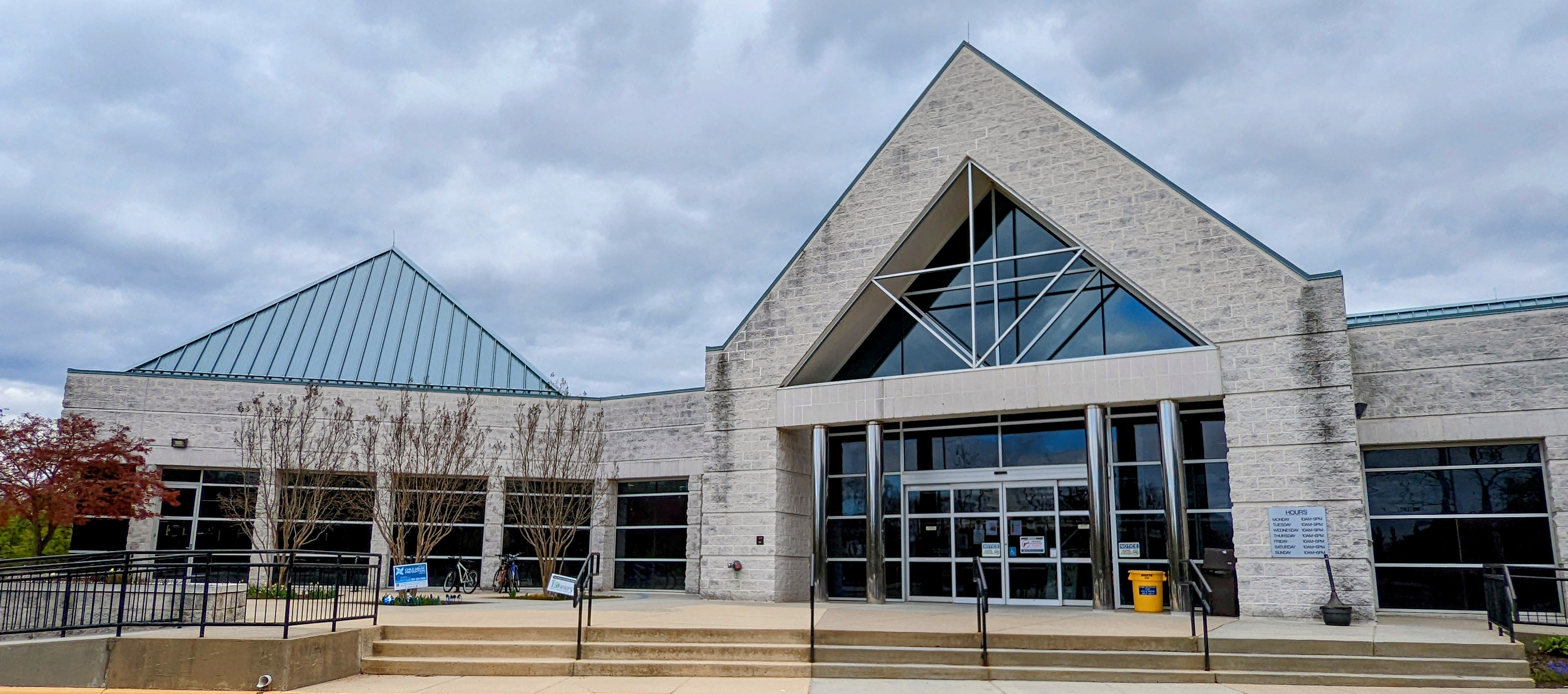
Centreville Regional Library

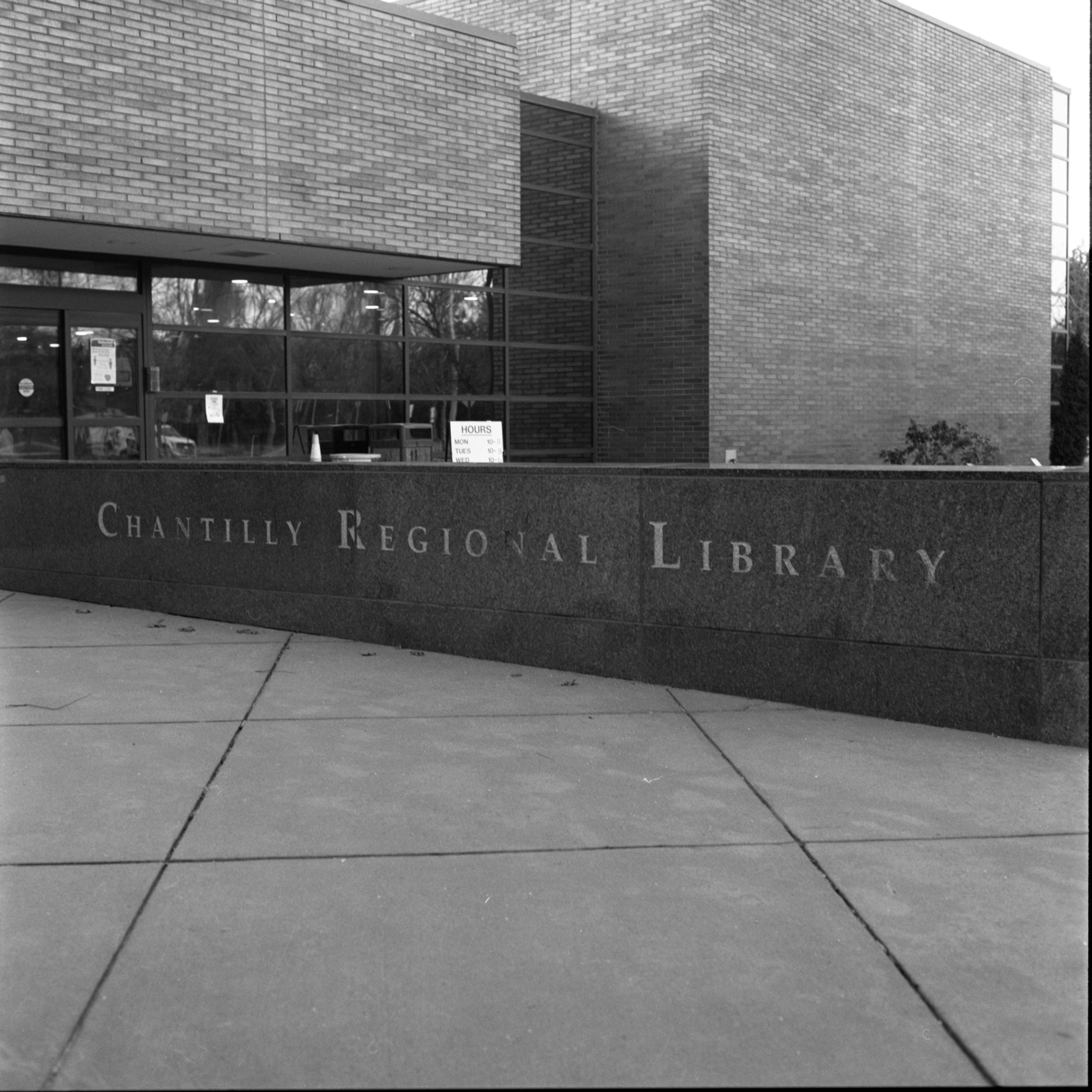
Chantilly regional library

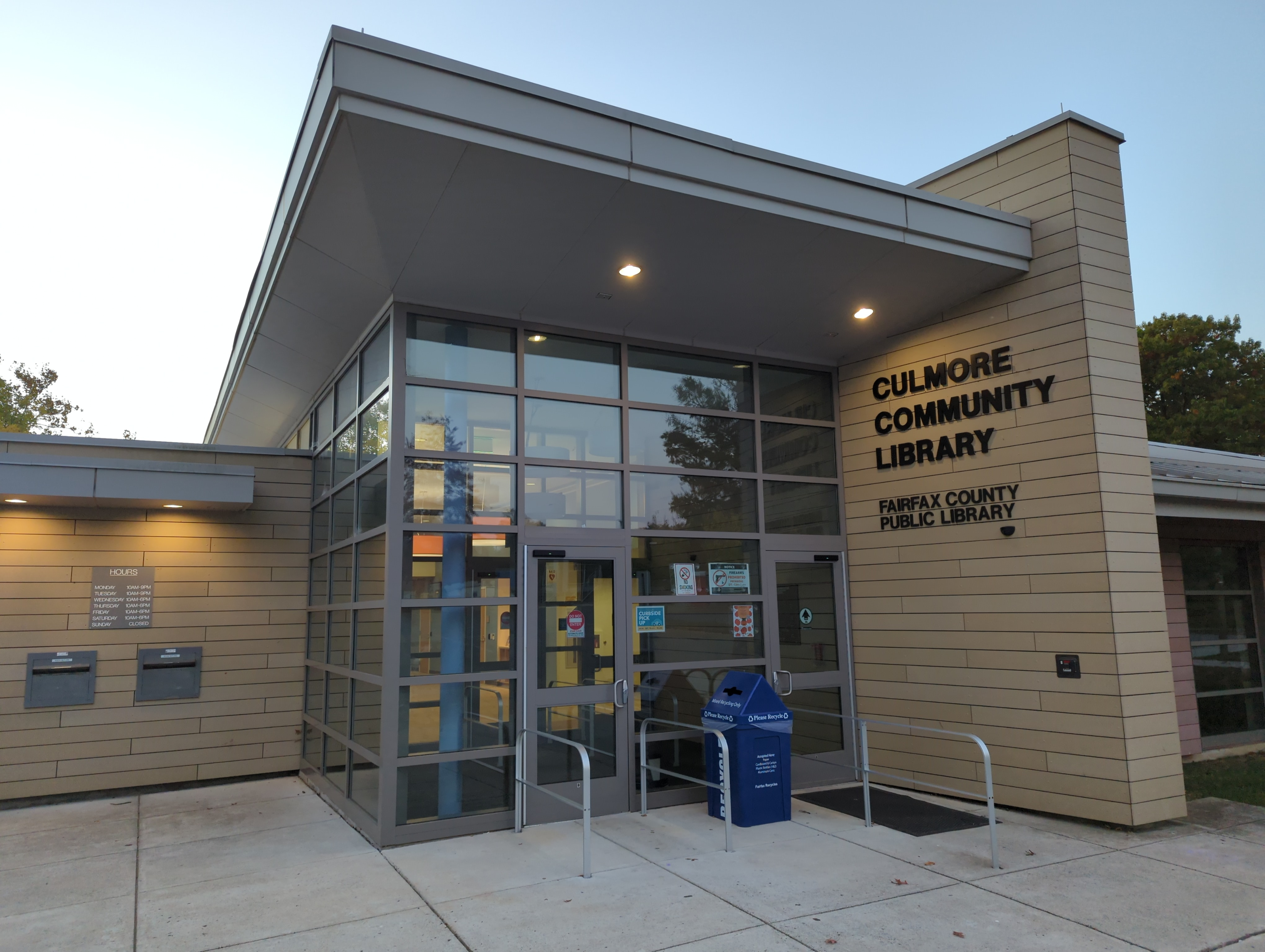
Culmore Community Library

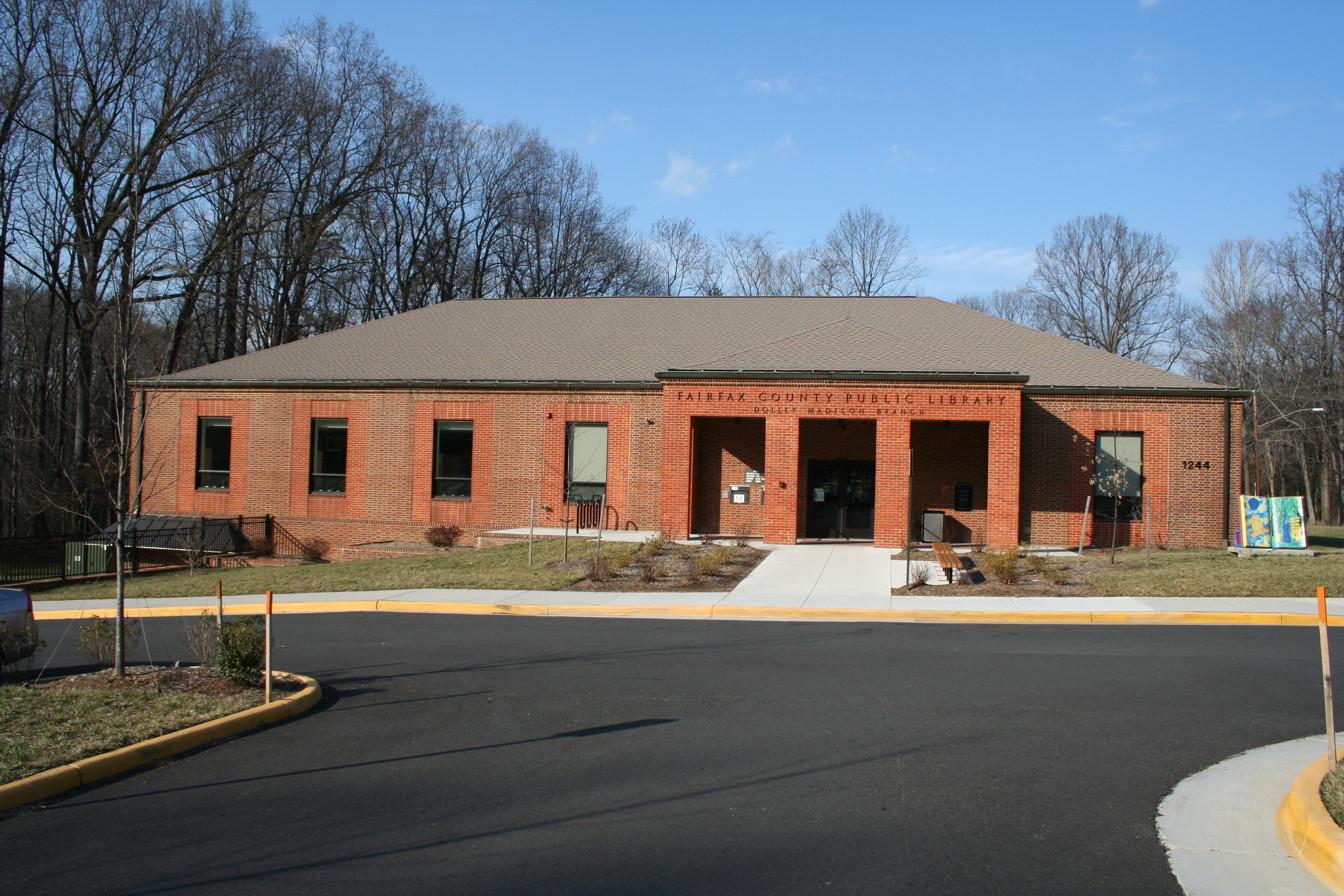
Dolley Madison library

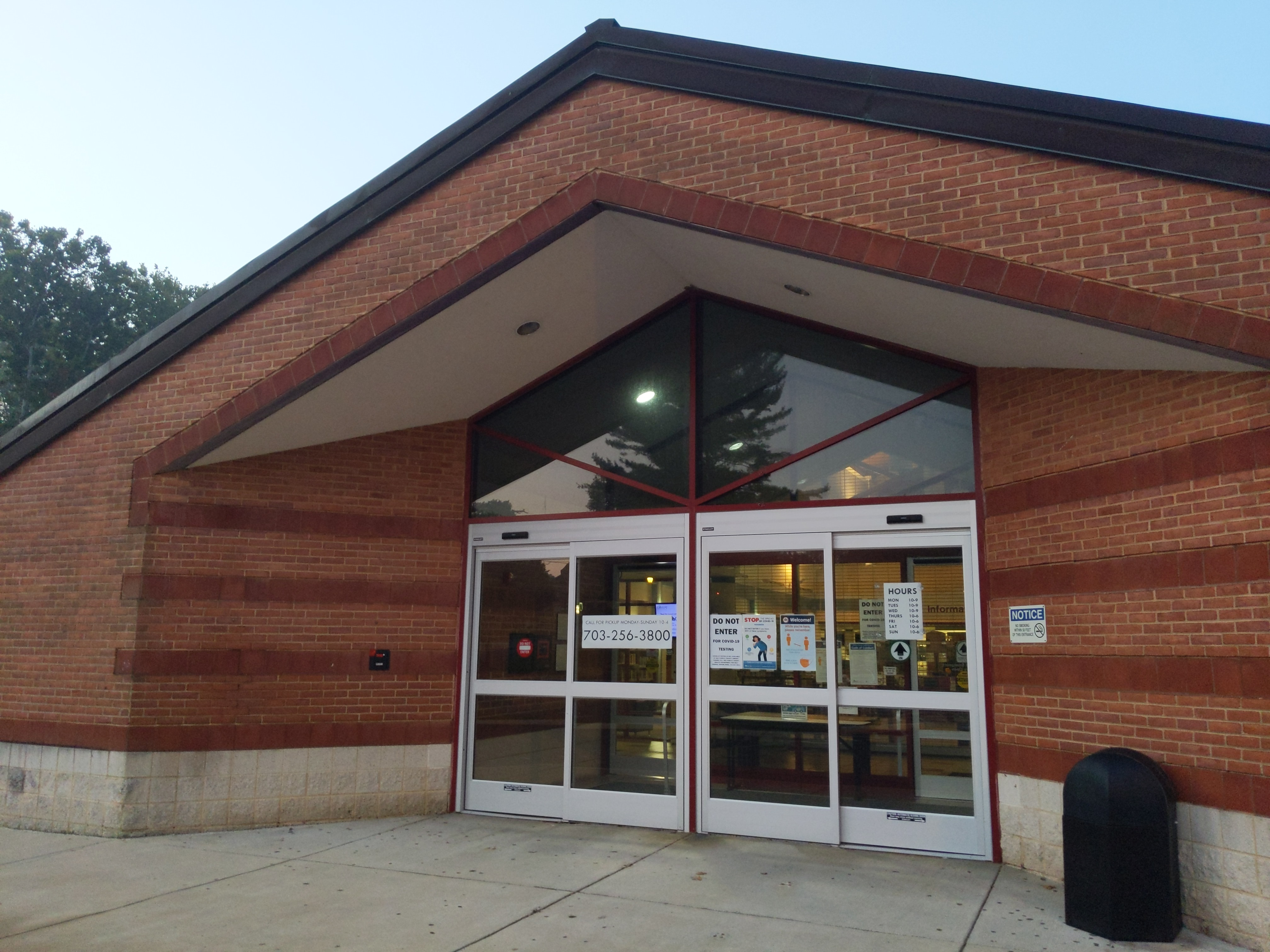
George Mason Regional Library

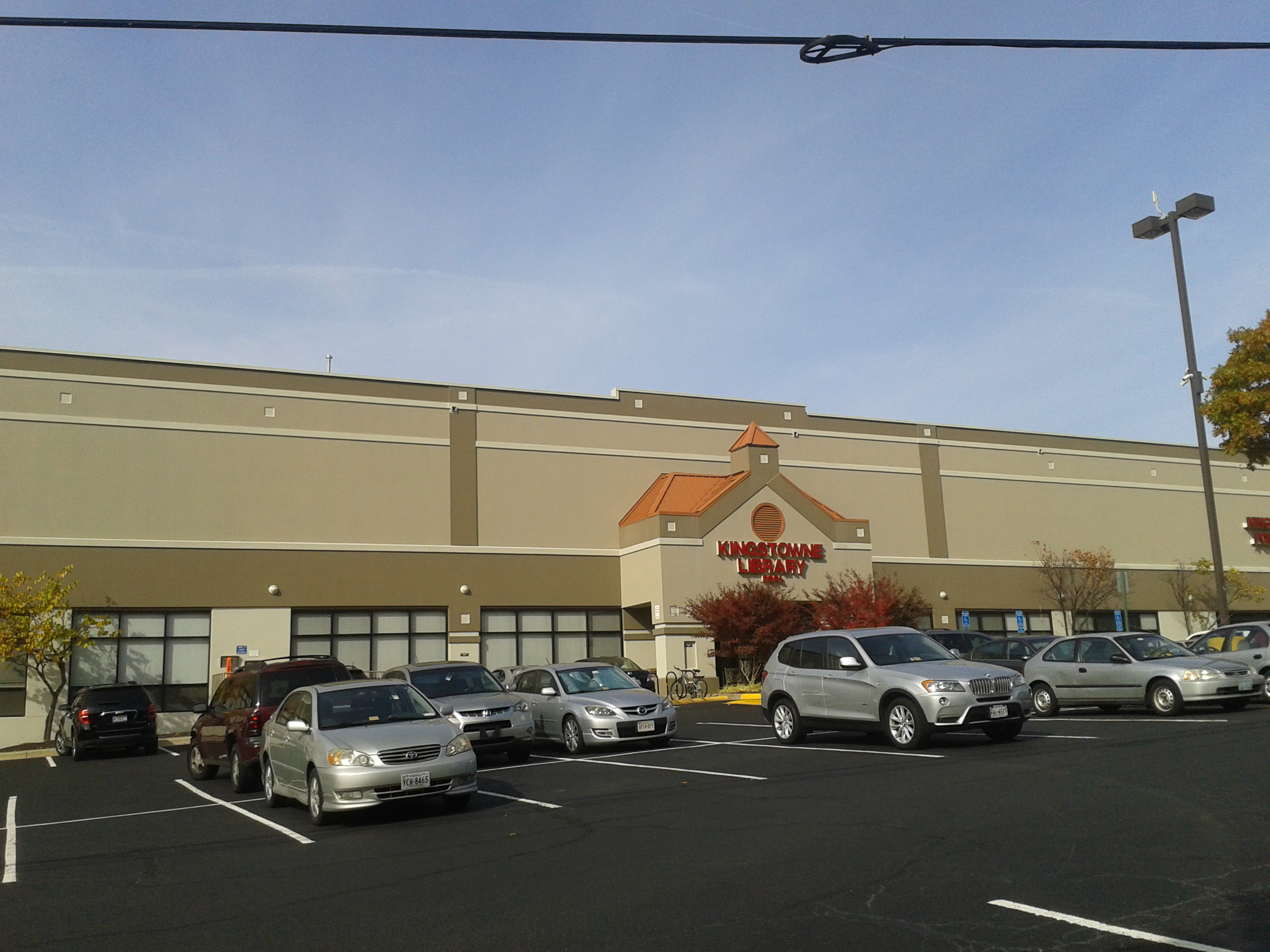
Former Kingstowne branch of Fairfax County Public Library in 2016; it has since moved

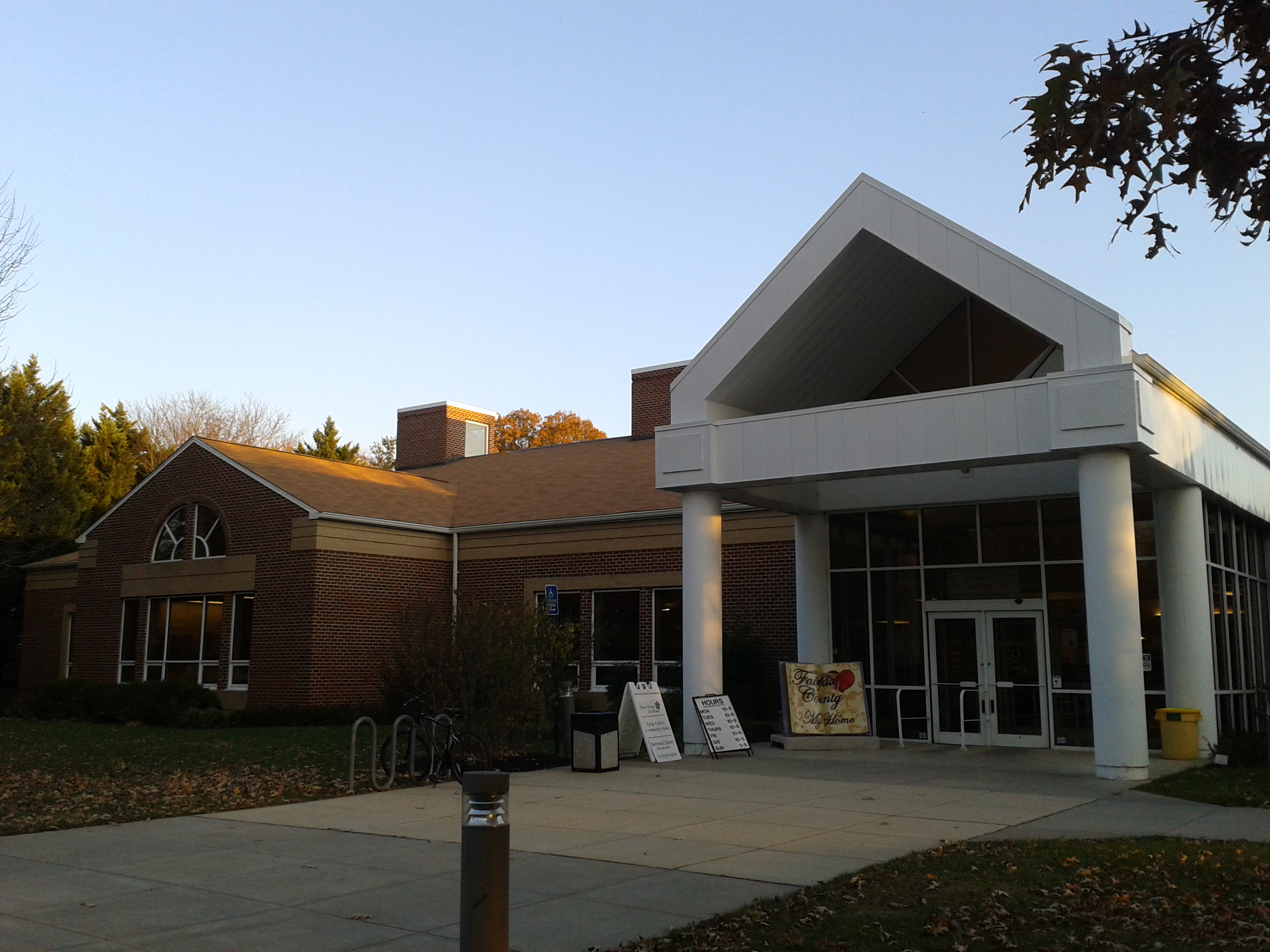
Sherwood Regional library (Hybla Valley) of Fairfax County Public Library in 2014

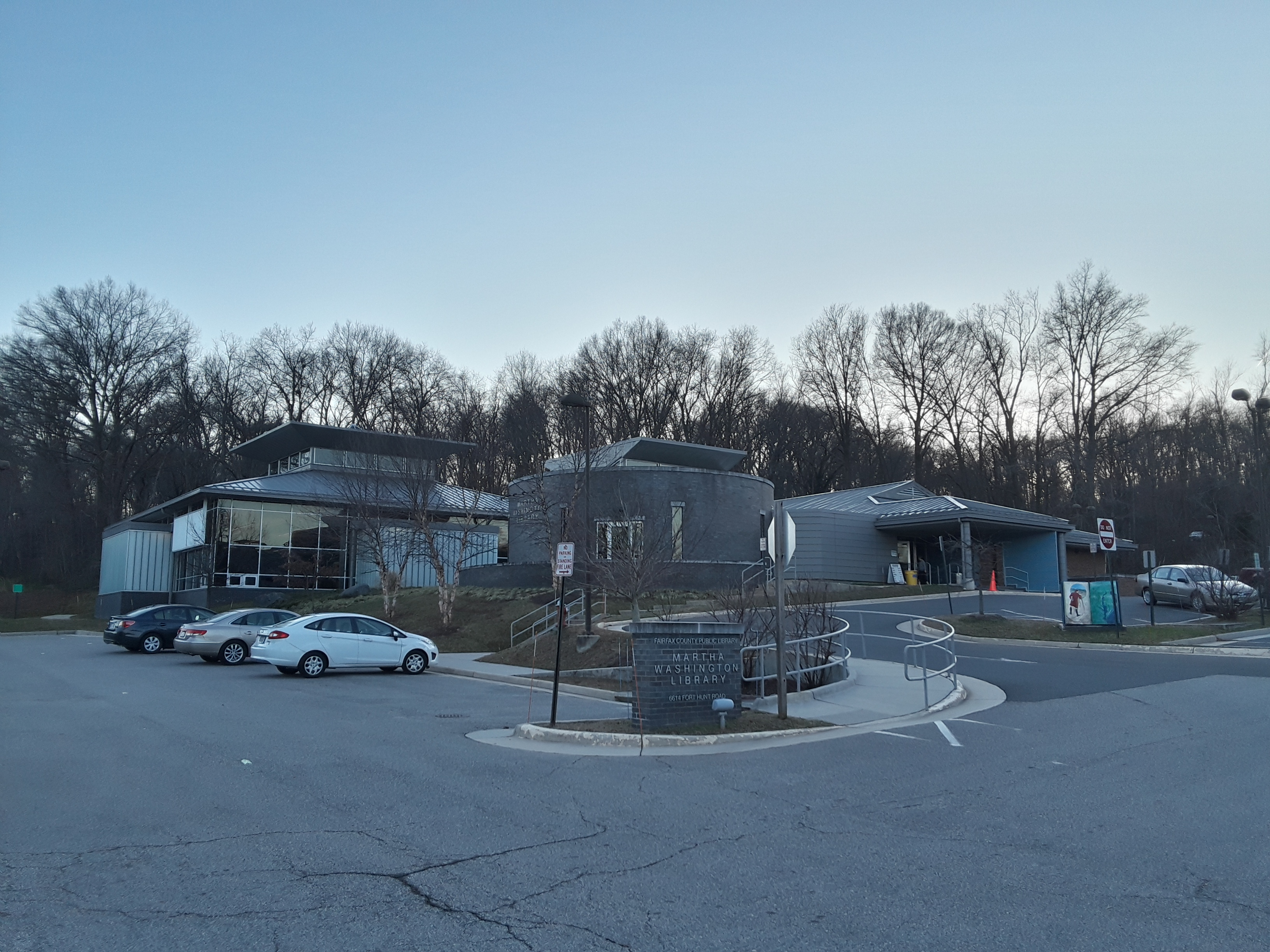
Martha Washington branch of Fairfax County Public Library in 2018

The Fairfax County Public Library (FCPL) is a public library system comprising 8 regional libraries, 14 community libraries and the Access Services Library Branch, which removes barriers to library services for people with disabilities. FCPL is headquartered in Suite 324 of The Fairfax County Government Center in unincorporated Fairfax County, Virginia, United States.

Hennen's American Public Library Ratings (HAPLR) has ranked the system among the top 10 libraries in the United States (for its size of 500,000+ residents) five times in the past 10 years.

== Description ==
According to the library's timeline, the Fairfax County Library was established in 1939.

In 1939, the Board of Supervisors allocated $250 in initial funds for a library program. With the help of federal funds from the Works Progress Administration, the county acquired a 1-ton Chevrolet Suburban. This “truck-turned-bookmobile” held 800 books, and stopped at different advertised locations each week, loaning books and picking returned items at stores, schools, and private homes.

A lifeline of information access during that time, the bookmobile was featured in the Oscar-winning 1945 documentary The Library of Congress which opens on a scene of residents rushing to meet the vehicle: “To an upland village in the state of Virginia, the first Tuesday in every month there comes a truckload of books. The traveling library has many friends among these remote farming people. The free book service provides them with a much needed link to the world beyond their hills.”

In 1950, the bookmobile garage building was expanded as it continued to serve as the central library. More than 10 years would pass before the county opened its first purpose-built building, originally called Headquarters Library, a 37,800-square-foot facility designed in the “colonial spirit” by Virginia architect J. Russell Bailey.

As of May 2015, there are 23 library branches—8 regional branches, 14 community branches, and one which assists people with disabilities. The library also oversees the county's Archives and Records Management Branch. The library's service area spans both the county and Fairfax City and several local jurisdictions through reciprocity agreements serving nearly half a million registered users.

The library system is the largest in Virginia in terms of population served (over one million people between Fairfax County and the City of Fairfax).

In the library's 2010 fiscal year (through June 2010), nearly 14 million items were borrowed from its collection of nearly three million books, CDs, DVDs, magazines, and other items. Nearly 5.7 million visits were made to the branches, and website visits reached almost 5 million.

The library offers a wide variety of services both in the branches and via its Web site, including searching through its catalog, reserving items, applying for a library card, viewing calendar of events at libraries, and reserving meeting rooms. The library has public computers for access to the Internet, catalog computers, ebooks, downloadable eaudiobooks, and subscription databases. The library and their Friends groups sponsor various programs, such as children's story times, national and local author readings and book signings, local musical concerts, technology classes and one-on-one sessions, and special events for the county's diverse population.

The number of full-time equivalent (FTE) employees dropped to 379 in 2014 from 430 at the end of 2013 following continuing budget cuts. Volunteers donated over 124,000 hours in 2014. As of November 2024, the director of the Fairfax County Public Library is Eric Carzon. Carzon succeeds Jessica A. Hudson, who served from mid-2016 until June 2024, before departing to become county manager for San Juan County, Washington. Prior to Hudson, Sam (Edwin S.) Clay III served as library director for more than thirty years.

== Branches ==
- Burke Centre Library (Burke Centre)
- Richard Byrd Library (Springfield)
- Centreville Regional Library (Centreville)
- Chantilly Regional Library (Chantilly)
- City of Fairfax Regional Library (City of Fairfax) — includes the Virginia Room
- Culmore Community Library (formerly Woodrow Wilson Library) (Bailey's Crossroads)
- Great Falls Library (Great Falls)
- Patrick Henry Library (Vienna)
- Herndon-Fortnightly Library (Herndon)
- Thomas Jefferson Library (West Falls Church)
- Kings Park Library (Kings Park)
- Kingstowne Regional Library (Kingstowne)
- Lorton Library (Lorton)
- Dolley Madison Library (McLean)
- John Marshall Library (Rose Hill)
- George Mason Regional Library (Annandale)
- Oakton Library (Oakton)
- Pohick Regional Library (Burke and West Springfield)
- Reston Regional Library (Reston)
- Sherwood Regional Library (Hybla Valley)
- Tysons-Pimmit Regional Library (Pimmit Hills and Tysons Corner)
- Martha Washington Library (Belle Haven)

== Non-resident privileges ==
Library cards are available to non-residents without charge who work, go to school in, or owns property in Fairfax County, or who live, work, own property or go to school in the City of Fairfax, or the towns of Herndon or Vienna. A card is also available free for a person who lives, works or owns property in a jurisdiction that provides reciprocal privileges. Thus, cards are available for free for residents, property owners and employees working in the District of Columbia; the Maryland Counties of Frederick, Montgomery, and Prince George's; the Virginia cities of Alexandria, Falls Church, Manassas and Manassas Park; and the Virginia counties of Arlington, Fauquier, Loudoun, and Prince William. All others who do not qualify may obtain a card for $27 a year.

== Nearby public library systems ==
- Alexandria Public Library
- Arlington Public Library
- District of Columbia Public Library
- Loudoun County Public Library
- Montgomery County Public Libraries
- Prince George's County Memorial Library System
