= Tysons, Virginia =

Unincorporated community in Virginia, US

Tysons
- Census-designated place
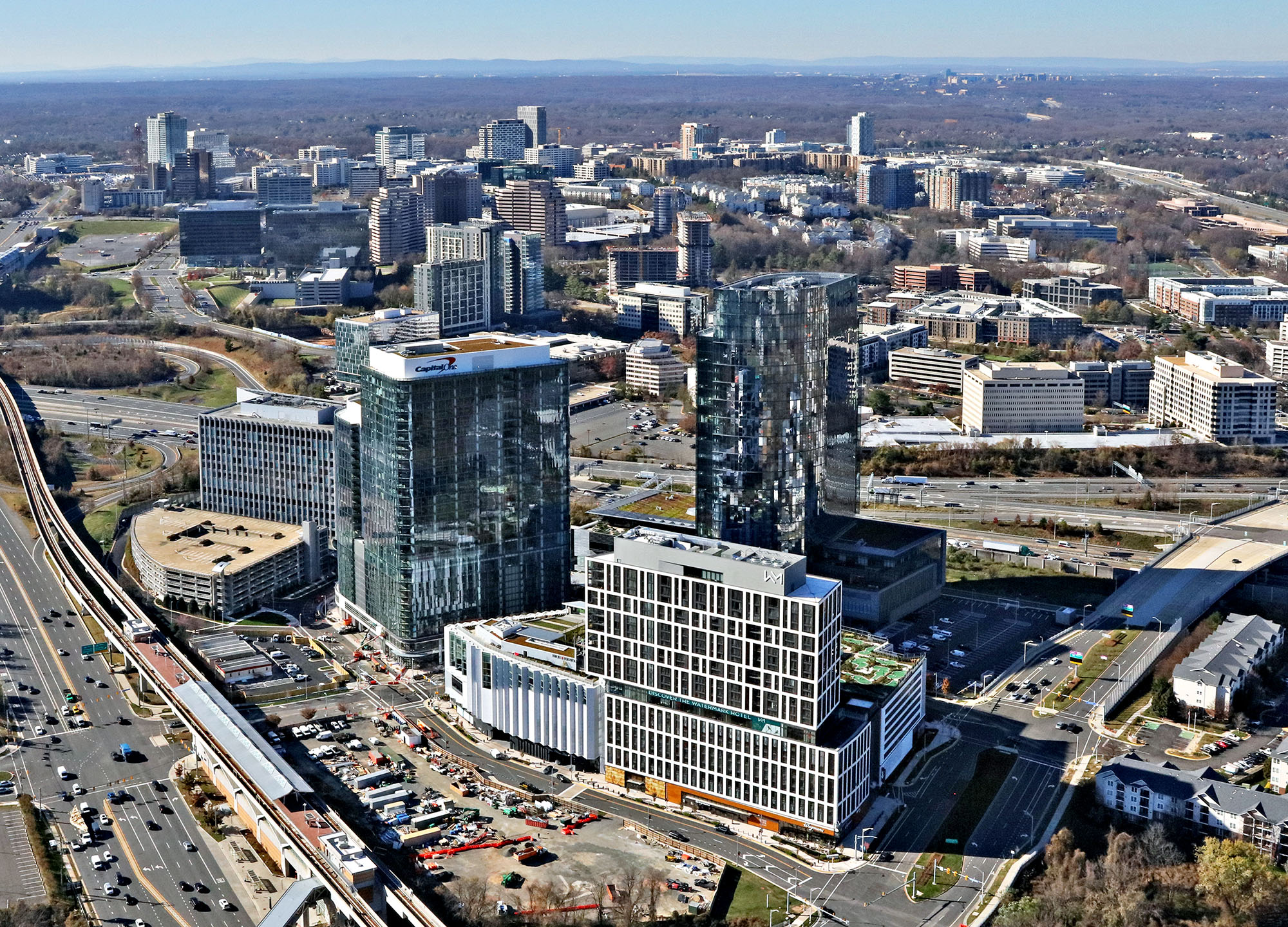
- Aerial view of Tysons with Capital One Center in the foreground, 2022

- Location of Tysons in Fairfax County, Virginia. Inset: Location of Fairfax County in Virginia

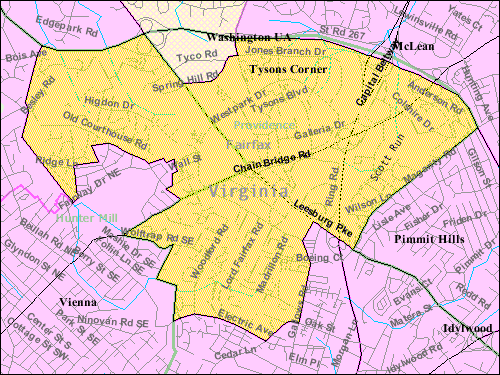
- Boundaries of Tysons in Fairfax County, Virginia as of 2003

- Location within Northern Virginia Location within Virginia Location within the United States
- Coordinates: 38°55′7″N 77°13′47″W
- Country: United States
- State: Virginia
- County: Fairfax

Area
  - Total: 4.3 sq mi (11.1 km^{2})
  - Land: 4.2 sq mi (11.0 km^{2})
  - Water: 0.010 sq mi (0.026 km^{2})
- Elevation: 486 ft (148 m)

Population (2020)
  - Total: 26,374
  - Estimate (2024): 28,936
  - Density: 6,177/sq mi (2,385/km^{2})
- Time zone: UTC−5 (Eastern (EST))
  - Summer (DST): UTC−4 (EDT)
- FIPS code: 51-79952
- GNIS feature ID: 1496341

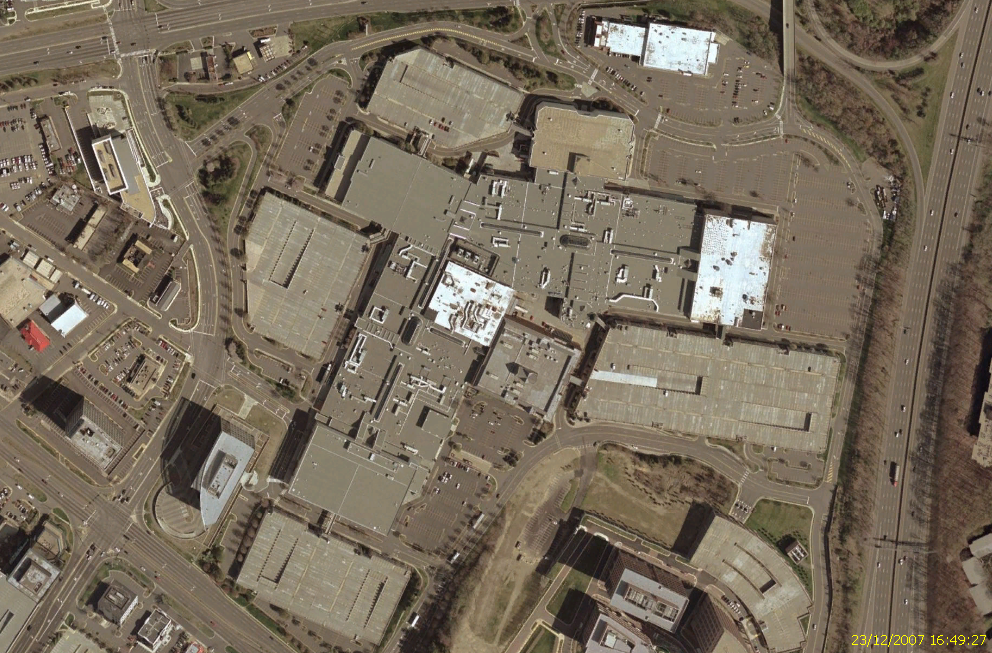
Tysons Corner Center mall is one of the most famous landmarks in Tysons, Virginia and Fairfax County.

Tysons, also known as Tysons Corner, is a census-designated place (CDP) in Fairfax County, Virginia, United States, spanning from the corner of SR 123 (Chain Bridge Road) and SR 7 (Leesburg Pike). It is part of the Washington metropolitan area and located in Northern Virginia between McLean and Vienna along I-495.

Tysons is home to two super-regional shopping malls, Tysons Corner Center and Tysons Galleria, and the corporate and administrative headquarters of Alarm.com, Appian, Booz Allen Hamilton, Capital One, Freddie Mac, Hilton Worldwide, ID.me, Intelsat, M.C. Dean, Inc., MicroStrategy, and Tegna Inc.

As an unincorporated community, Tysons is Fairfax County's central business district and a regional commercial center. It has been called a quintessential example of an edge city. The population was 26,374 as of the 2020 census.

== History ==
=== 19th century ===
Known originally as Peach Grove, the area received the designation "Tysons Crossroads" after the Civil War. William Tyson, a Maryland native from Cecil County, purchased a tract of land from A. Lawrence Foster. Tyson served as postmaster of the now discontinued Peach Grove Post Office from 1854 to 1866.

=== 20th century ===
As recently as the 1950s, Tysons was a quiet rural intersection flanked by a few small stores and a fruit stand operated by the Tyson descendants, who sold apples and apple cider from the corner of their property. In 1963, the Tysons area moved from a country crossroads to a giant commercial urban area with the awarding of contracts at the interchange of VA Route 7 and VA Route 123.

In 1962, the Fairfax County Board of Supervisors approved the Tysons Corner Shopping Center, now Tysons Corner Center, which was planned to be 88.13 acres (356,600 m^{2}) within a 150 acres (0.61 km^{2}) triangle bordered by Chain Bridge Road, Leesburg Pike, and the Capital Beltway. Developers proclaimed it the largest enclosed mall in the world when it opened on July 25, 1968.

=== 21st century ===
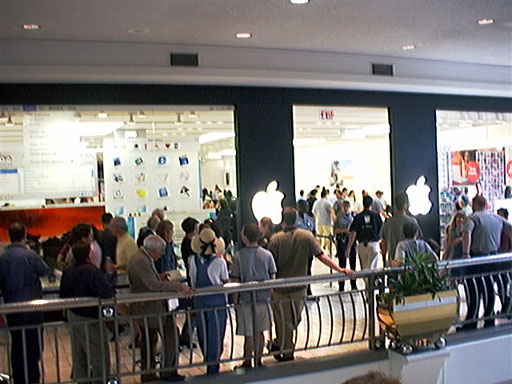
A line for the opening of the world's first Apple Store at Tysons Corner Center in 2001

In the early 21st century, an influx of technology companies into Northern Virginia led to new office buildings and hotels to the landscape. The rapid growth of Tysons in comparison to other locations near the Capital Beltway has been the topic of numerous studies. One factor was the aggressive promotion of Tysons by Earle Williams, for many years the CEO of the defense contracting firm Braddock Dunn & McDonald. Tysons serves as a downtown of Fairfax County, with one quarter of all office space and one eighth of all retail in the county, despite occupying just 1% of the county. It is an auto-oriented edge city with severe traffic congestion, and faces competition from the urban areas of Arlington and newer suburban edge cities such as Dulles.

In 2008, the Fairfax County Board of Supervisors unanimously voted to begin a 40-year plan to urbanize Tysons around the coming four stops of Washington Metro's Silver Line in the vein of neighboring Arlington County's Rosslyn-Ballston corridor. A preliminary estimate from the Fairfax County Department of Transportation suggested that $7.83 billion in transportation infrastructure projects would be necessary to transform Tysons Corner into a high-density urban center from 2010 to 2050, most of which would be allocated to both construction phases of the Silver Line. Existing plans call for construction of a grid layout for streets around the rail stations, projected to cost $742 million. An additional $1 billion will be spent on further transit and street grid projects from 2030 to 2050.

In November 2012, the county approved Arbor Row, a 2,500,000 ft (762,000 m) mixed-used development of office and residential high-rises, ground-floor retail, and underground parking near the Tysons Corner (now Tysons) station. In April 2013, the county approved Scotts Run Station South, a 6,700,000 ft (2,042,160 m) development containing 17 buildings, including six office and residential buildings, one hotel, and ground-floor retail near the McLean Station. This development alone will be larger than Reston Town Center.

Ahead of the Washington Metro Silver Line opening in mid-2014, the Fairfax County Board of Supervisors and the Tysons Partnership, a nonprofit association that represents the area's stakeholders, began rebranding the area as simply "Tysons", dropping "Corner" from the name. The change started as a matter of convenience, but later took hold to market the change in the area's character, according to members of the board. The change was unofficial at the time, and either "Tysons" or "Tysons Corner" could be used in addresses. But in November 2015, the U.S. Census Bureau announced the CDP's name would officially be changed to Tysons as of the next summer.

Tysons is seen as a modern prototype of an edge city. In its 40-year history, it has been given substantial redevelopment offers for the next 20 to 30 years. The area has seen growing interest as plans to make it an urban center were begun in 2010. Private-sector development in the United States in combination with political groups have begun the planning process behind the redevelopment of Tysons. Two forces are at work in the creation of an edge city, as it can be beneficial to both parties. With the redevelopment process taking place there has been an aggressive push to bring in businesses to Tysons. Edge cities such as Tysons have specific regional accessibility that has been enhanced by major projects funded by federal and state governments. One of the bigger enhancements to transportation specifically to Tysons was the construction "of the Washington Dulles International Airport and an associated access road and the Capital Beltway but also expansions to state roads".

The plan remains to see Tysons become Fairfax County's downtown core. So far, "eight districts have been delimited, with four centered on new metro stations being transit-oriented development districts". Future plans for transportation around the area continue to be made. "The aims of the plan are for 75% of development to be within half a mile of metro stations, an urban center of 200,000 jobs and 100,000 residents, a jobs balance of 4.0 per household".

Tysons was one of the inspirations for, and figures prominently in, Joel Garreau's pioneering study of the edge city phenomenon. Among the reasons for calling Tysons an edge city is that, in contrast to typical "bedroom" suburbs, people commute into it in the morning and away from it at night, with a daytime population greater than 100,000 and a nighttime population of fewer than 20,000. Planners envision up to 200,000 jobs and 100,000 residents in coming decades.

== Geography ==
Tysons is located at 38°55′7″N 77°13′47″W (38.918485, −77.229833) at an elevation of 486 feet (148 m). Located in Northern Virginia at the intersection of Virginia State Route 123 and State Route 7, Tysons is 11 miles (18 km) west of downtown Washington, D.C., and 6 miles (9.7 km) northeast of Fairfax, the county seat.

The community lies in the Piedmont upland, about 3.7 miles (6.0 km) south-southwest of the Potomac River. The highest natural point in Fairfax County, at 520 feet (160 m) above sea level, is in Tysons. Wolftrap Creek, a tributary of nearby Difficult Run, forms the community's northwestern border. Two of the creek's tributaries, Moomac Creek and the Old Courthouse Spring Branch, flow north through northwest Tysons. Scott Run, a tributary of the Potomac, flows north through eastern Tysons.

According to the U.S. Census Bureau, the community has an area of 4.27 square miles (11.1 km^{2}), of which 4.26 square miles (11.0 km^{2}) is land and 0.01 square miles (0.026 km^{2}) is water.

As a suburb of Washington, D.C., Tysons is a part of both the Washington metropolitan area and the larger Baltimore–Washington metropolitan area. It is bordered on all sides by other Washington suburbs, including McLean to the north, Pimmit Hills to the east, Idylwood to the southeast, Dunn Loring to the south, Vienna to the southwest, and Wolf Trap to the west.

=== Climate ===
Tysons' climate is characterized by hot, humid summers and generally mild to cool winters. According to the Köppen Climate Classification system, Tysons has a humid subtropical climate, abbreviated "Cfa" on climate maps.

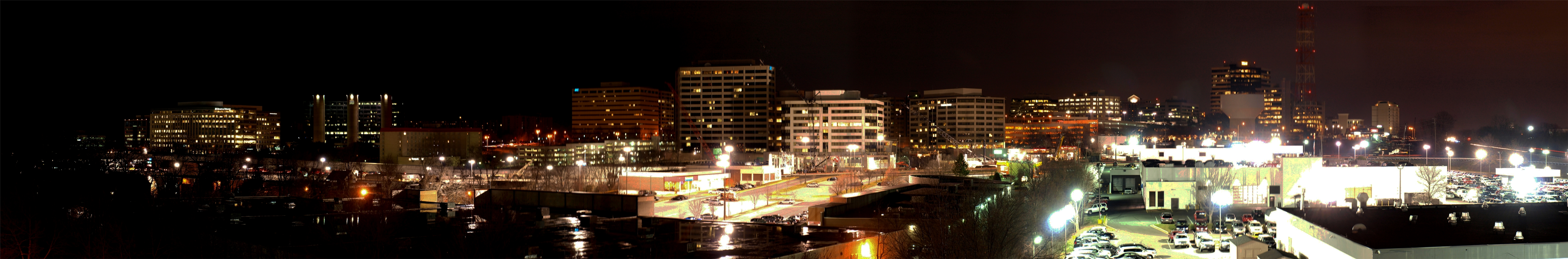
Tysons' skyline at night, 2012

== Demographics ==
Historical population
Census	Pop.	Note	%±
1950	1,674		—
1980	10,065		—
1990	13,124		30.4%
2000	18,540		41.3%
2010	19,627		5.9%
2020	26,374		34.4%
2024 (est.)	28,936	▲	9.7%
U.S. Decennial Census; 1940 1950 1960 1970; 1980 1990 2000; 2010

The community was first listed as an unincorprated community under the name Tysons Corner in the 1950 U.S. census. It was not listed in the 1960 U.S. census or the 1970 U.S. census before reappearing as a census designated place in the 1980 U.S. census. The name was changed to Tysons for the 2020 U.S. census.

=== Racial and ethnic composition ===
Tysons CDP, Virginia – Racial and ethnic composition Note: the US Census treats Hispanic/Latino as an ethnic category. This table excludes Latinos from the racial categories and assigns them to a separate category. Hispanics/Latinos may be of any race.
Race / Ethnicity (NH = Non-Hispanic)	Pop 2000	Pop 2010	Pop 2020	% 2000	% 2010	% 2020
White alone (NH)	12,368	10,816	12,455	66.71%	55.11%	47.22%
Black or African American alone (NH)	703	923	1,633	3.79%	4.70%	6.19%
Native American or Alaska Native alone (NH)	23	26	10	0.12%	0.13%	0.04%
Asian alone (NH)	3,283	5,382	8,528	17.71%	27.42%	32.33%
Native Hawaiian or Pacific Islander alone (NH)	13	20	7	0.07%	0.10%	0.03%
Other race alone (NH)	37	75	178	0.20%	0.38%	0.67%
Mixed race or Multiracial (NH)	973	796	1,288	5.25%	4.06%	4.88%
Hispanic or Latino (any race)	1,140	1,589	2,275	6.15%	8.10%	8.63%
Total	18,540	19,627	26,374	100.00%	100.00%	100.00%

=== 2020 census ===
As of the 2020 census, Tysons had a population of 26,374. The median age was 35.4 years. 16.4% of residents were under the age of 18 and 12.2% of residents were 65 years of age or older. For every 100 females there were 98.3 males, and for every 100 females age 18 and over there were 96.5 males age 18 and over.

100.0% of residents lived in urban areas, while 0.0% lived in rural areas.

There were 13,030 households in Tysons, of which 22.3% had children under the age of 18 living in them. Of all households, 36.6% were married-couple households, 26.5% were households with a male householder and no spouse or partner present, and 30.5% were households with a female householder and no spouse or partner present. About 40.8% of all households were made up of individuals and 9.0% had someone living alone who was 65 years of age or older.

There were 14,222 housing units, of which 8.4% were vacant. The homeowner vacancy rate was 1.0% and the rental vacancy rate was 7.7%.

Racial composition as of the 2020 census
Race	Number	Percent
White	12,886	48.9%
Black or African American	1,684	6.4%
American Indian and Alaska Native	44	0.2%
Asian	8,545	32.4%
Native Hawaiian and Other Pacific Islander	8	0.0%
Some other race	826	3.1%
Two or more races	2,381	9.0%

=== 2010 census ===
As of the 2010 census, there were 19,627 people, 9,481 households, and 4,754 families residing in the community. The population density was 4,607.3 inhabitants per square mile (1,778.9/km^{2}). There were 10,637 housing units at an average density of 2,496.9 per square mile (964.1/km^{2}). The racial makeup of the community was 60.9% White, 27.5% Asian, 4.9% African American, 0.2% American Indian, 0.1% Pacific Islander, 1.9% from other races, and 4.5% from two or more races. Hispanics and Latinos of any race were 8.1% of the population.

There were 9,481 households, out of which 23.5% had children under the age of 18 living with them, 39.8% were married couples living together, 2.9% had a male householder with no wife present, 7.4% had a female householder with no husband present, and 49.9% were non-families. 40.7% of all households were made up of individuals, and 18.4% had someone living alone who was 65 years of age or older. The average household size was 2.07, and the average family size was 2.87.

The age distribution of the community was 18.4% under the age of 18, 6.6% from 18 to 24, 40.4% from 25 to 44, 23.5% from 45 to 64, and 11.1% who were 65 years of age or older. The median age was 35.8 years. The gender makeup of the community was 47.7% male and 52.3% female.

The median income for a household in the community was $94,083, and the median income for a family was $131,717. Males had a median income of $85,645 versus $66,019 for females. The community's per capita income was $64,294. About 2.8% of families and 4.2% of the population were below the poverty line, including 1.3% of those under age 18 and 14.3% of those age 65 or over.

== Economy ==
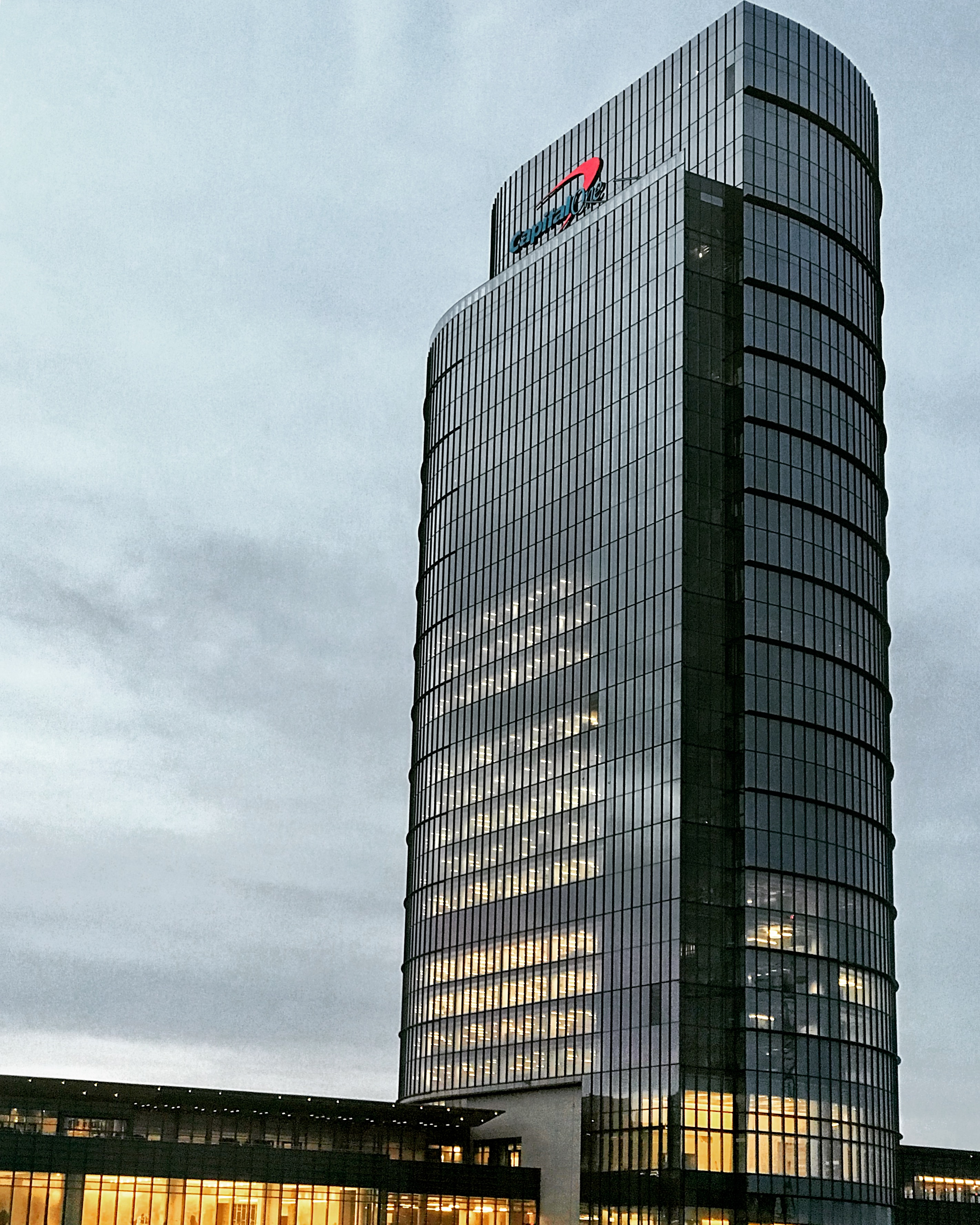
Capital One Tower in Tysons, the tallest office building in the Washington metropolitan area, houses the headquarters for Capital One.

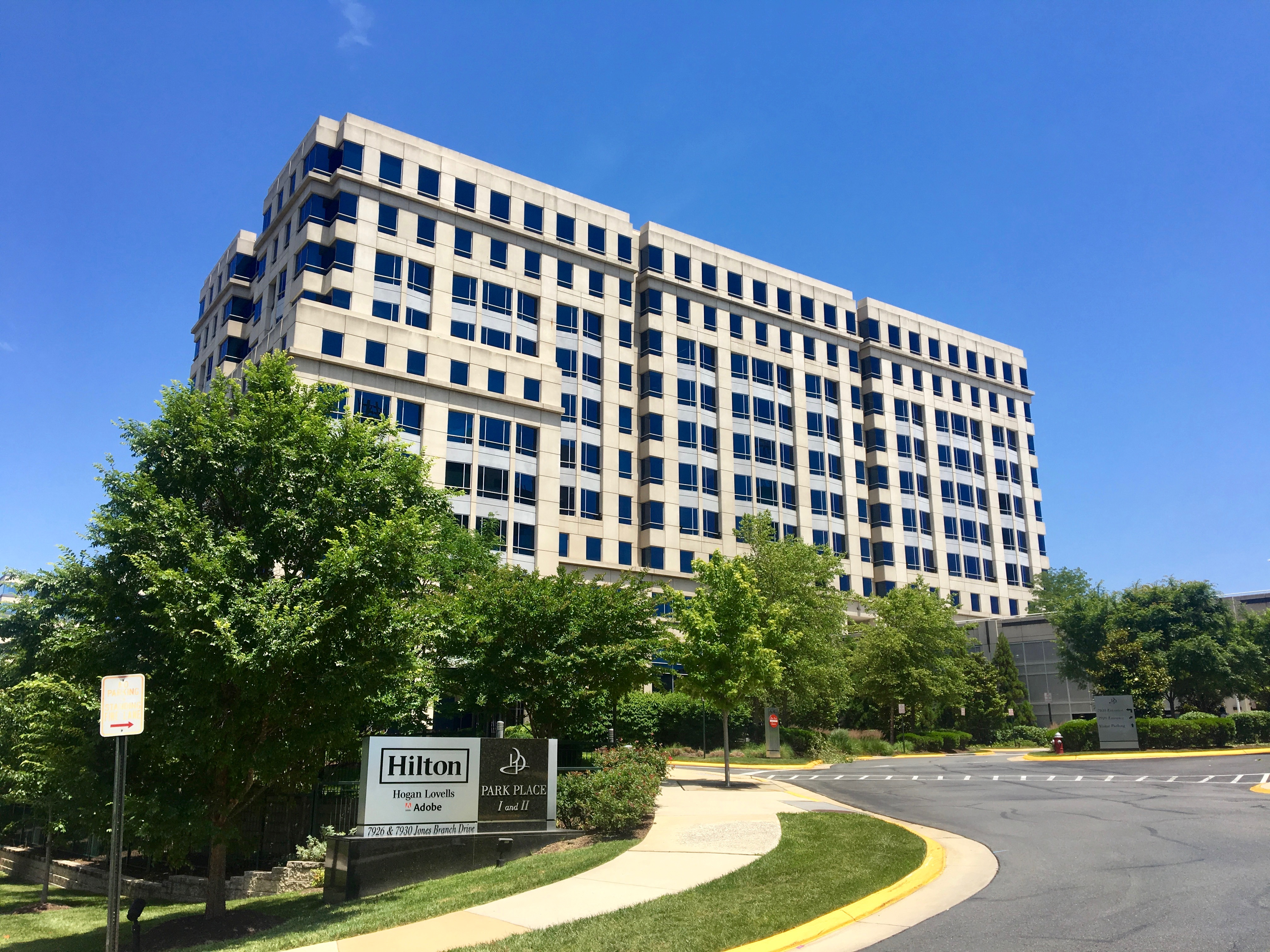
Headquarters building for Hilton Worldwide, the world's second largest hotel chain.

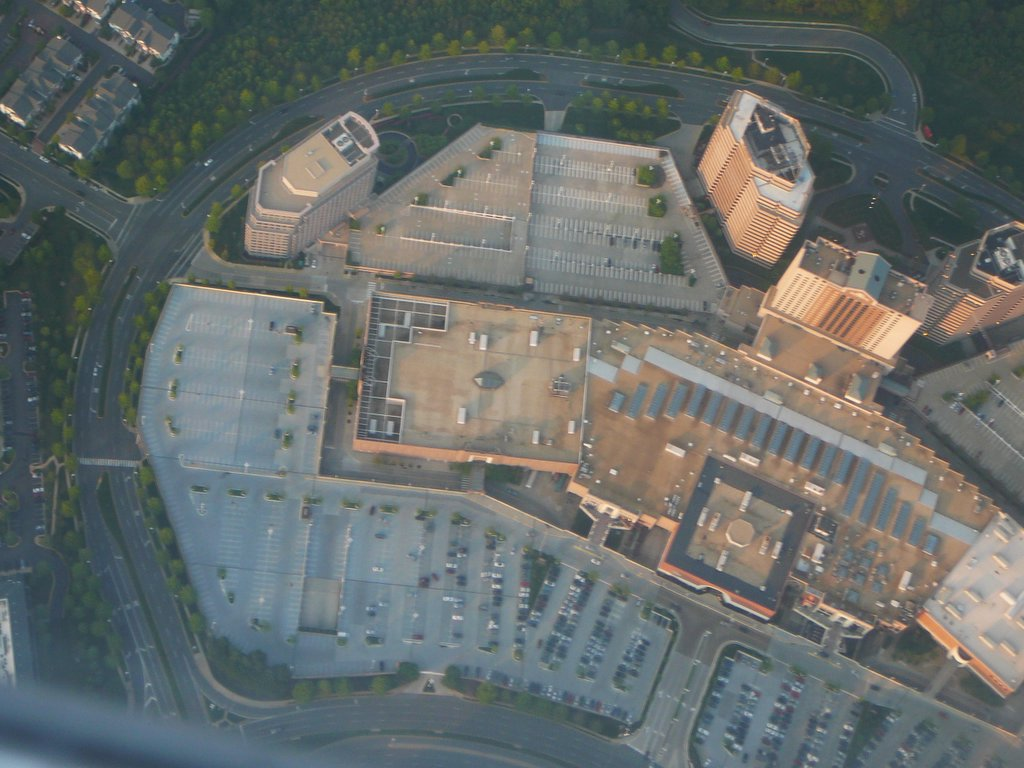
The Tysons II development area, home to Tysons Galleria

Tysons is Fairfax County's central business district with the largest concentration of office space in Northern Virginia. It had 46 million sq ft (4.3 million m^{2}) of office and retail space as of 2008, making it a classic example of an edge city. As of 2013, Tysons had 14 million sq ft (1.3 million m^{2}) of office and retail space approved or under construction, approximately one-third of a 45 million sq ft backlog of projected urban development in close proximity to the area's four Metro Silver Line stations.

The corporate headquarters of Alarm.com, Appian Corporation, Booz Allen Hamilton, Capital One, Cvent, Freddie Mac, Hilton Worldwide, Logistics Management Institute, M.C. Dean, Inc., MicroStrategy, MITRE Corporation, SAIC, Space Adventures, Spacenet, and Sunrise Senior Living are in Tysons, though most use a McLean or Vienna address. The Fairfax County Economic Development Authority is also headquartered in the CDP. Until 1996, AOL was headquartered in the Tysons CDP, near Vienna. Qatar Airways operated its North American headquarters office in Tysons, but later moved to Washington, D.C. Other firms with offices in Tysons include Adobe Systems, BAE Systems Inc., Compuware, Deloitte, Ernst & Young, KPMG, Northrop Grumman, Palantir Technologies, and Vie de France.

The area is home to Tysons Corner Center, the largest shopping mall in the state and in the Baltimore-Washington area – and two upscale shopping centers, Tysons Galleria (also one of the largest malls in the region) and Fairfax Square, which neighbor it to the north and south respectively. The average household income within a 5-mile (8 km) radius of Tysons Corner Center is $174,809. Every weekday, Tysons draws 55,000 shoppers from around the region.

Tysons includes a technology industry base and network infrastructure. In 2007, roughly 1,200 technology companies operated in Tysons. 31.6% of the jobs in the Tysons submarket and 20.2% of the companies in the submarket were in the technology sector.

With 115,000 office and retail workers, Tysons is the nation's 12th-largest employment center. As of 2012, 75.6% of the population over age 16 was in the labor force. 0.6% was in the armed forces, and 75.0% was in the civilian labor force with 70.4% employed and 4.5% unemployed. The occupational composition of the employed civilian labor force was: 66.4% in management, business, science, and arts; 20.3% in sales and office occupations; 10.5% in service occupations; 2.1% in natural resources, construction, and maintenance; 0.7% in production, transportation, and material moving. The three industries employing the largest percentages of the working civilian labor force were professional, scientific, and management, and administrative and waste management services (28.8%); educational services, health care, and social assistance (13.3%); and public administration (12.8%).

The cost of living in Tysons is very high; compared to a U.S. average of 100, the cost of living index for the community is 140.4. As of 2022, the median home value in the community was $620,800, the median selected monthly owner cost was $3,118 for housing units with a mortgage and $1,297 for those without, and the median gross rent was $2,426.

== Government ==
As it is unincorporated, Tysons has no municipal government. The Fairfax County Government provides local government services directly. For the purposes of representation on the Fairfax County Board of Supervisors, Tysons is in the Board's Hunter Mill and Providence Districts.

Companies in Tysons typically use McLean or Vienna addresses, but in 2011, the United States Postal Service approved the use of Tysons Corner as a postal address for the 22102 and 22182 ZIP codes of McLean and Vienna, respectively.

Tysons is in Virginia's 8th and 11th U.S. Congressional Districts. For the purposes of representation in the Virginia General Assembly, it is in the 32nd district of the Virginia Senate and the 34th and 35th districts of the Virginia House of Delegates.

== Politics ==
In the 2020 presidential election, Democrat Joe Biden received 58.1% of the vote (479 ballots cast), ahead of Republican Donald Trump who received 39.0% of the vote (321 votes), and Libertarian Jo Jorgensen, with 2.8% of the vote (24 votes).

== Education ==
=== Primary and secondary education ===
Fairfax County Public Schools (FCPS) provides public primary and secondary education to Tysons residents. Five FCPS schools are in Tysons: Freedom Hill Elementary School, Joyce Kilmer Middle School, Westbriar Elementary School, Spring Hill Elementary School, and Westgate Elementary School. Resident high school students attend nearby George C. Marshall High School, James Madison High School, Langley High School, or McLean High School.

=== Libraries ===
Fairfax County Public Library operates the Tysons-Pimmit Regional Library in nearby Pimmit Hills.

== Transportation ==
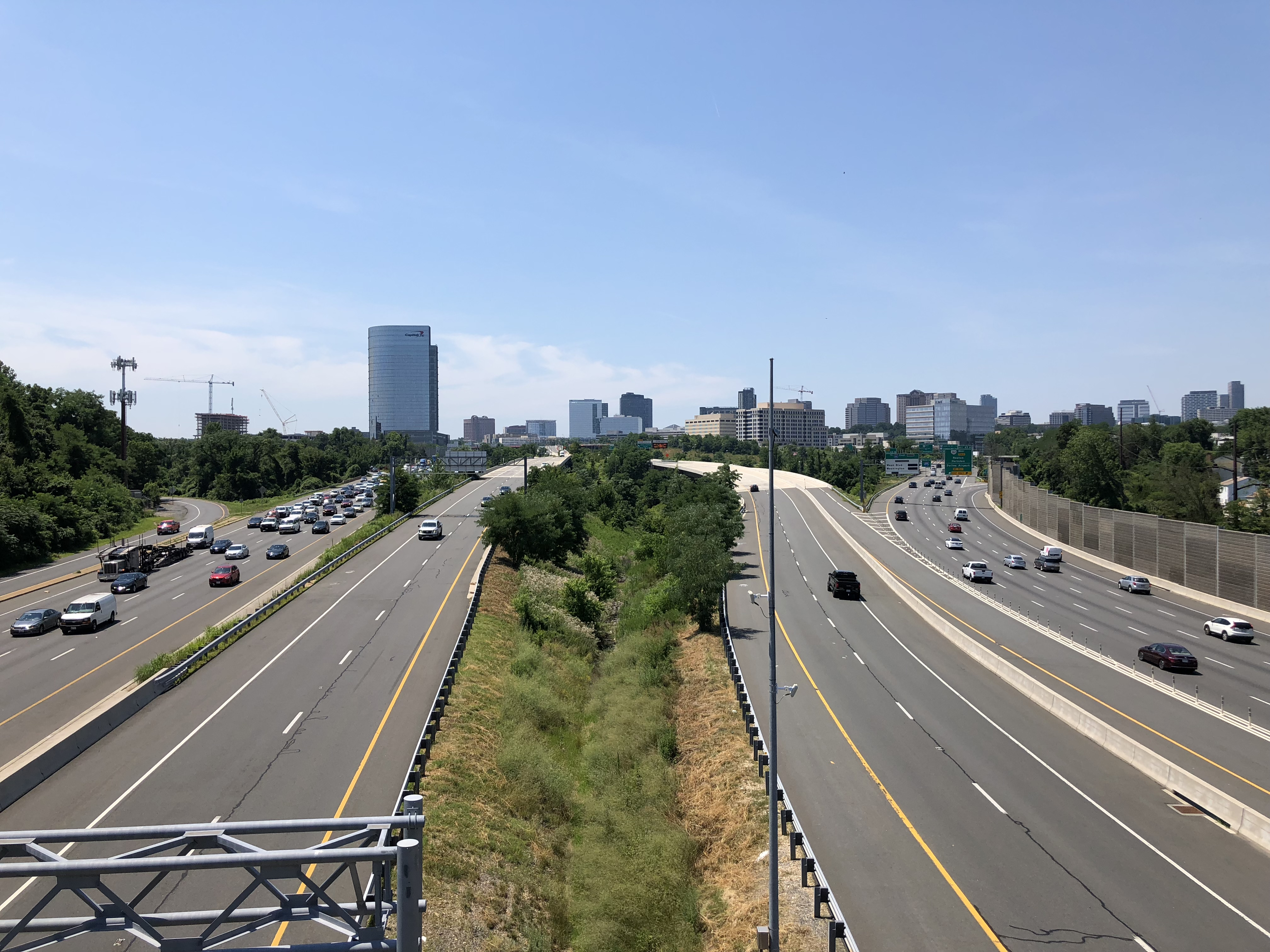
I-495 south towards Tysons

Interstate 495, the Capital Beltway, runs generally north–south through eastern Tysons. Virginia State Route 267, the east-west Dulles Toll Road, runs along the community's northern border. The I-495/VA 267 interchange is located in the northeastern part of the community. Virginia State Route 7 runs southeast–northwest through Tysons, intersecting Virginia State Route 123, which runs northeast–southwest, in the community's center.

Due to its large daytime population, Tysons experiences high traffic congestion. This has led to plans for denser development, including additional rail infrastructure. On July 26, 2014, the Washington Metro started offering rapid transit rail service in Tysons via its Silver Line. Metro operates four stations on the line in Tysons; from east to west, these are McLean, Tysons, Greensboro, and Spring Hill. The Silver Line connects Tysons by rail with Reston, Washington Dulles International Airport, and Ashburn to the west and Arlington, Washington, D.C., and Maryland to the east.

In February 2017, VDOT began construction on the Jones Branch Connector, a half-mile (800-meter) roadway that crosses Interstate 495 and connects Central and Tysons East and is projected to carry more than 32,000 vehicles per day by 2040. The bridge opened to traffic in 2018, and work was completed in 2020. The connection improved the operations along the adjacent road systems. This connection extended and widened existing lanes eastward along Scotts Crossing Road, ending at Route 123 adjacent to the McLean Metro Station.

== See also ==
- List of tallest buildings in Tysons, Virginia
