= Idylwood, Virginia =

- Census-designated place
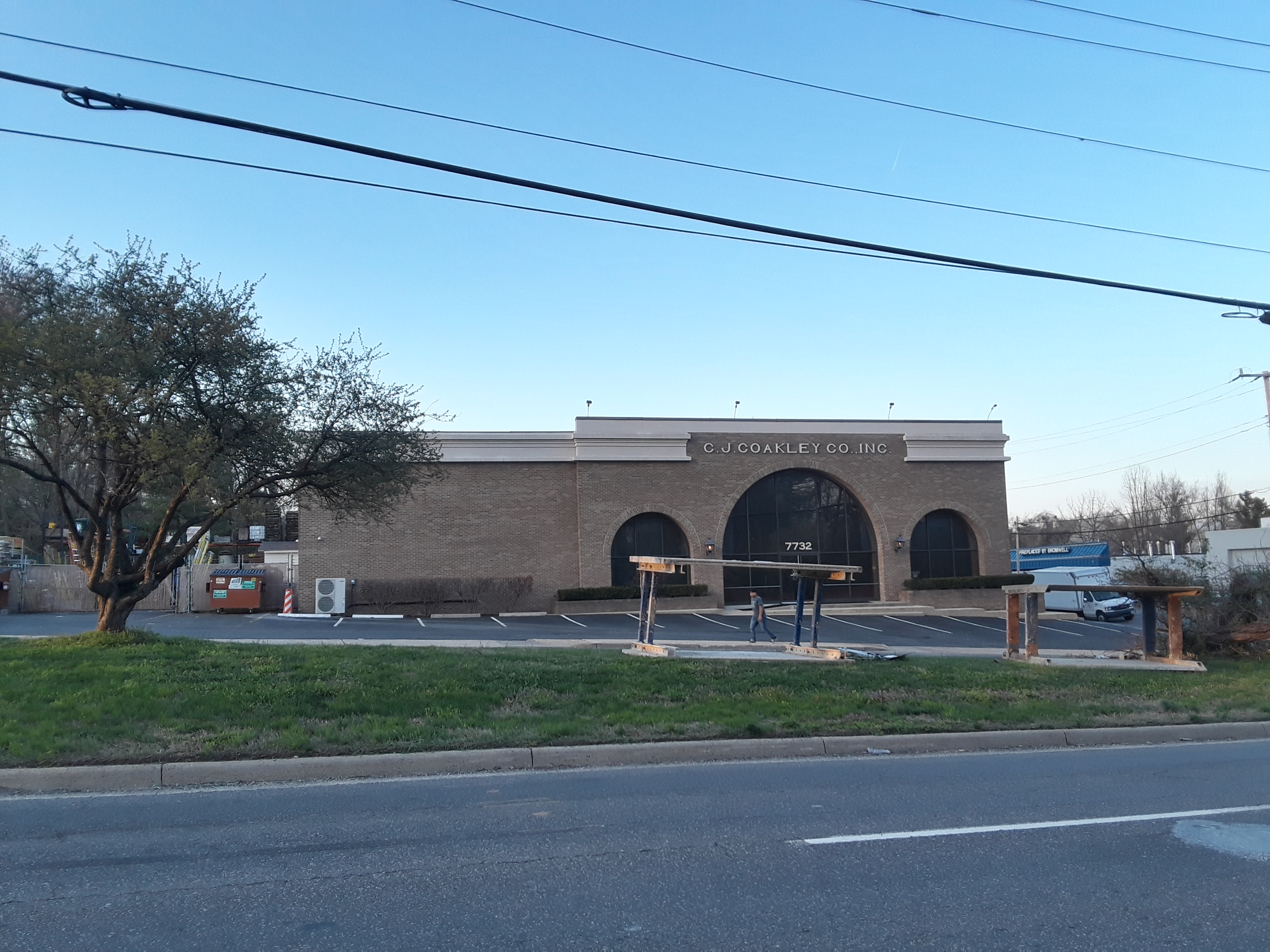
- Pet hotel on Route 29 in near Merrifield

- Location of Idylwood in Fairfax County, Virginia

- Location within Northern Virginia Location within Virginia Location within the United States
- Coordinates: 38°53′23″N 77°12′21″W
- Country: United States
- State: Virginia
- County: Fairfax

Area
  - Total: 2.81 sq mi (7.3 km^{2})
  - Land: 2.80 sq mi (7.3 km^{2})
  - Water: 0.01 sq mi (0.026 km^{2})
- Elevation: 463 ft (141 m)

Population (2020)
  - Total: 17,954
  - Density: 6,412.14/sq mi (2,475.74/km^{2})
- Time zone: UTC−5 (Eastern (EST))
  - Summer (DST): UTC−4 (EDT)
- FIPS code: 51-39448
- GNIS feature ID: 1495738

Idylwood is a census-designated place (CDP) in Fairfax County, Virginia, United States. The population was 17,954 as of the 2020 census. It originally developed as a suburban community along the route of the Washington and Old Dominion Railroad, and later along Virginia State Route 7. The construction of the Capital Beltway in the 1960s, and I-66 and the Orange Line of the Washington Metrorail system in the 1980s, as well as the concurrent development of nearby Tysons Corner into Washington's leading suburban business district, led to the development of several apartment, townhouse, and small-lot single-family housing complexes, as well as the high-rise Idylwood Towers condominium, in the portion of Idylwood lying to the north of I-66. The area to the south of I-66 remains primarily large-lot single-family.

== Geography ==
Idylwood is located in eastern Fairfax County at 38°53′23″N 77°12′21″W (38.889722, −77.205920). It is bordered to the east by the city of Falls Church, to the north by Pimmit Hills and Tysons Corner, to the west by Dunn Loring, to the southwest by Merrifield, and to the south by West Falls Church. The Capital Beltway forms the western border of the CDP, Virginia Route 7 (Leesburg Pike) forms the northern border, and U.S. Route 29 (Lee Highway) forms the southern border.

According to the United States Census Bureau, the CDP has a total area of 2.81 square miles (7.3 km^{2}), of which 0.01 square miles (0.026 km^{2}) is water.

== Demographics ==
Historical population
Census	Pop.	Note	%±
1980	11,982		—
1990	14,710		22.8%
2000	16,005		8.8%
2010	17,288		8.0%
2020	17,954		3.9%

=== Racial and ethnic composition ===
Idylwood CDP, Virginia – Racial and ethnic composition Note: the US Census treats Hispanic/Latino as an ethnic category. This table excludes Latinos from the racial categories and assigns them to a separate category. Hispanics/Latinos may be of any race.
Race / Ethnicity (NH = Non-Hispanic)	Pop 2000	Pop 2010	Pop 2020	% 2000	% 2010	% 2020
White alone (NH)	8,775	8,632	7,930	54.83%	49.93%	44.17%
Black or African American alone (NH)	1,058	950	953	6.61%	5.50%	5.31%
Native American or Alaska Native alone (NH)	32	29	24	0.20%	0.17%	0.13%
Asian alone (NH)	3,067	3,660	4,351	19.16%	21.17%	24.23%
Native Hawaiian or Pacific Islander alone (NH)	5	8	12	0.03%	0.05%	0.07%
Other race alone (NH)	44	79	125	0.27%	0.46%	0.70%
Mixed race or Multiracial (NH)	403	458	898	2.52%	2.65%	5.00%
Hispanic or Latino (any race)	2,621	3,472	3,661	16.38%	20.08%	20.39%
Total	16,005	17,288	17,954	100.00%	100.00%	100.00%

=== 2020 census ===
As of the 2020 census, Idylwood had a population of 17,954. The median age was 35.8 years. 23.2% of residents were under the age of 18 and 11.4% of residents were 65 years of age or older. For every 100 females there were 97.8 males, and for every 100 females age 18 and over there were 94.7 males age 18 and over.

100.0% of residents lived in urban areas, while 0.0% lived in rural areas.

There were 6,847 households in Idylwood, of which 35.3% had children under the age of 18 living in them. Of all households, 49.3% were married-couple households, 19.8% were households with a male householder and no spouse or partner present, and 25.4% were households with a female householder and no spouse or partner present. About 25.4% of all households were made up of individuals and 6.8% had someone living alone who was 65 years of age or older.

There were 7,101 housing units, of which 3.6% were vacant. The homeowner vacancy rate was 0.9% and the rental vacancy rate was 4.2%.

=== 2000 census ===
As of the census of 2000, there were 16,005 people, 6,560 households, and 3,831 families residing in the CDP. The population density was 5,618.0 people per square mile (2,168.3/km^{2}). There were 6,727 housing units at an average density of 2,361.3/sq mi (911.3/km^{2}). The racial makeup of the CDP was 62.69% White, 6.93% African American, 0.32% Native American, 19.21% Asian, 0.06% Pacific Islander, 7.09% from other races, and 3.71% from two or more races. Hispanic or Latino of any race were 16.38% of the population.

There were 6,560 households, out of which 26.6% had children under the age of 18 living with them, 45.8% were married couples living together, 8.7% had a female householder with no husband present, and 41.6% were non-families. 29.0% of all households were made up of individuals, and 4.3% had someone living alone who was 65 years of age or older. The average household size was 2.44 and the average family size was 3.04.

In the CDP, the population was spread out, with 19.7% under the age of 18, 9.4% from 18 to 24, 42.2% from 25 to 44, 21.5% from 45 to 64, and 7.2% who were 65 years of age or older. The median age was 33 years. For every 100 females, there were 100.6 males. For every 100 females age 18 and over, there were 98.9 males.

The median income for a household in the CDP was $66,895, and the median income for a family was $74,103. Males had a median income of $50,107 versus $44,449 for females. The per capita income for the CDP was $34,485. About 4.0% of families and 5.8% of the population were below the poverty line, including 7.0% of those under age 18 and 3.4% of those age 65 or over.

== Economy ==
The firm USIS had its headquarters in Idylwood.

== Education ==
Fairfax County Public Schools operates public schools serving Idylwood. George C. Marshall High School is in Idylwood.

== Parks and recreation ==
The Fairfax County Park Authority operates the Jefferson District Golf Course in the southwest corner of the CDP. Idylwood Park, in the western part of the CDP north of I-66 and east of the Beltway, is a county park with baseball, softball, and soccer fields, plus basketball and tennis courts.
