= Alarm.com =

American security company

Alarm.com, Inc.
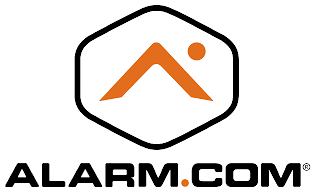
- Type: Public
- Traded as: Nasdaq: ALRM; S&P 600 component
- Industry: Security systems; Remote monitoring; Home automation; Energy management
- Founded: 2000; 26 years ago
- Headquarters: Tysons, Virginia, U.S.
- Key people: Steve Trundle (president and CEO)
- Revenue: ▲$1.01 billion (2025)
- Net income: ▲US$132 million (2025)
- Number of employees: 2,058 (2025)
- Website: alarm.com

Alarm.com, Inc. is an American technology company that provides cloud-based services for remote control, home automation, and alarm monitoring services. The company was founded in 2000 as a spinoff from MicroStrategy (now Strategy Inc.). The company is based in Tysons, Virginia.

== History ==
Alarm.com was founded in 2000 by Jean-Paul Martin and Alison J. Slavin as part of MicroStrategy's research and development unit. Microstrategy founder Michael J. Saylor spent $2 million to acquire dozens of premium domain names, including Alarm.com. The company's initial product technology sent consumers and businesses alerts via email, text message, or voice mail when their alarms were triggered.

In 2003, the company launched its first web-based monitoring product.

In February 2009, Alarm.com was acquired in a management buyout led by venture capital firm ABS Capital Partners and private equity firm Egis Capital, for $27.7 million. At the time of the acquisition, the company had 150,000 customers and its products were reportedly sold by 800 North American dealers. Shortly before the acquisition, the company had launched a remote video monitoring product that sent alerts to mobile phones.

In July 2011, the company announced the addition of remote control property heating and cooling capabilities to its emPower home automation platform.

In 2012, Technology Crossover Ventures invested $136 million in the company.

In June 2015, Alarm.com issued an IPO at $14 a share. ABS Capital Partners and Technology Crossover Ventures, which invested $136 million in the company, remained the majority shareholders. The company reported revenue of $167.3 million at the time.

In 2016, Alarm.com integrated its cloud-based connected home platform with Amazon's Echo wireless speaker and voice-command devices, as well as the HomeKit-compatible Apple TV.

In October 2019, the company acquired OpenEye, a provider of commercial Cloud-managed video surveillance products.

In 2020, Alarm.com acquired indoor gunshot detection technology company Shooter Detection Systems for an undisclosed sum.

In 2022, the company announced a "smart" arming feature that auto-arms and disarms alarms based on user activity. In October 2022, the company acquired St. Louis-based Noonlight, a provider of mobile apps for connecting people to emergency services.

In 2023, Alarm.com acquired Warsaw, Poland–based EBS, a manufacturer of smart communicators for alarm systems.

The company reported $1.1 billion in revenue in 2025, with 2,058 employees.

== Services ==
Alarm.com offers a cloud-based platform for smart home and business operating systems. Its connected property IoT platform reportedly provides security connectivity for about 10 million properties, and works with about 10,000 service providers. The platform enables subscribers to secure and monitor their properties via web-based and mobile applications, as well as through integrations with Apple TV, Amazon FireTV, Google Home and Amazon Alexa. Monitoring services include contracts through third-party contractors such as ADT. Services include interactive security, video monitoring, energy management and home automation, and are enabled through various hardware and device partnerships.
