= Pimmit Hills, Virginia =

- Census-designated place (CDP)
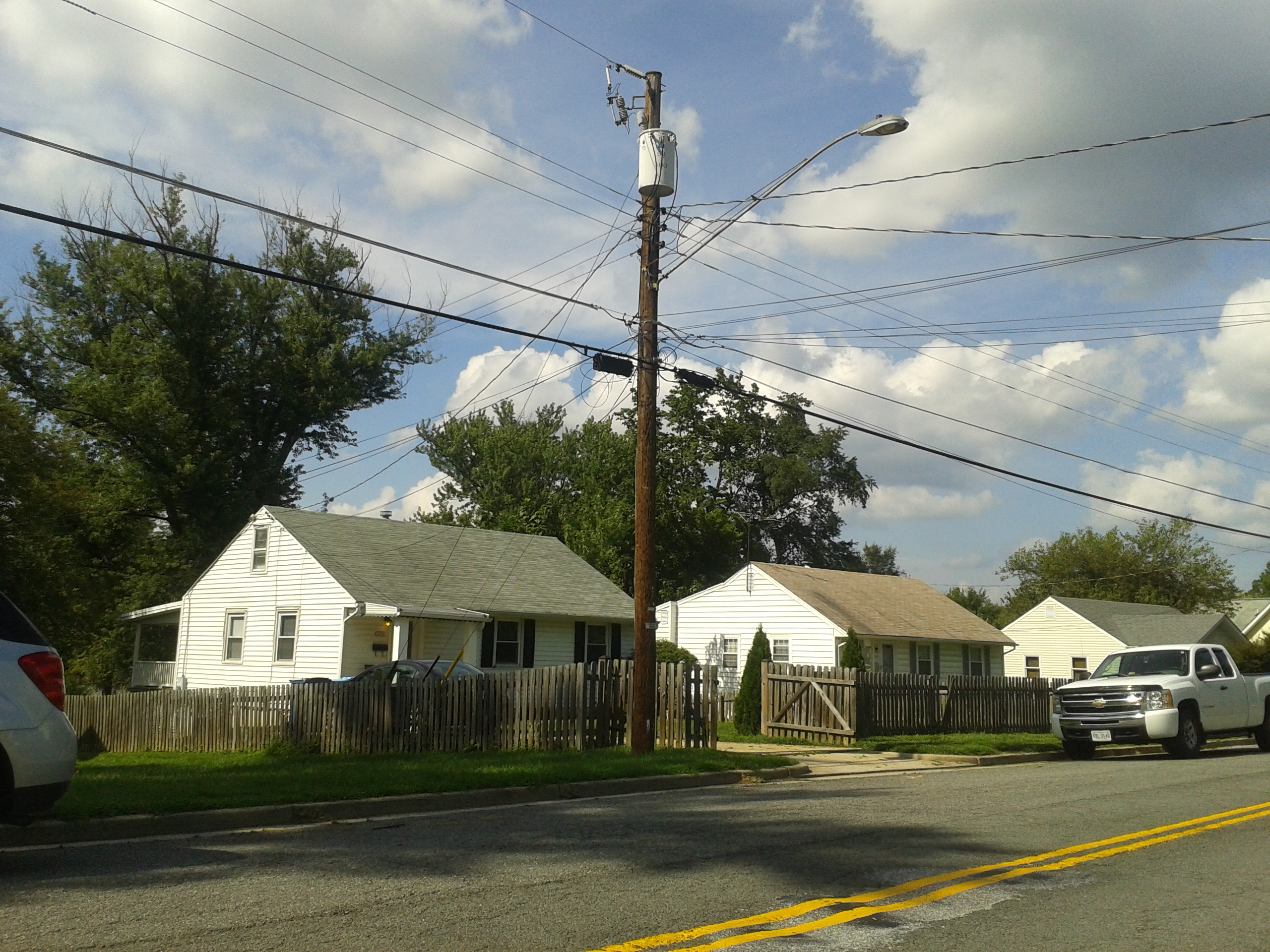
- Houses in Pimmit Hills, 2017

- Location of Pimmit Hills in Fairfax County, Virginia

- Location within Northern Virginia Location within Virginia Location within the United States
- Coordinates: 38°54′42″N 77°12′5″W
- Country: United States
- State: Virginia
- County: Fairfax

Area
  - Total: 1.5 sq mi (3.8 km^{2})
  - Land: 1.5 sq mi (3.8 km^{2})
  - Water: 0 sq mi (0.0 km^{2})
- Elevation: 364 ft (111 m)

Population (2020)
  - Total: 6,569
  - Density: 4,429.5/sq mi (1,710.2/km^{2})
- Time zone: UTC−5 (Eastern (EST))
  - Summer (DST): UTC−4 (EDT)
- FIPS code: 51-62264
- GNIS feature ID: 1496083

Pimmit Hills is a census-designated place (CDP) in Fairfax County, Virginia, United States, a neighborhood within a densely populated urban area. As of the 2020 census, Pimmit Hills had a population of 6,569. The name derives from Pimmit Run, the stream that was named for John Pimmit.

== John Pimmit ==
John Pimmit (also known as Pimett Pimmett, or Pymmett) and Thomas Browne were deeded 100 acres of land on 12 March 1672 by Elizabeth Alexander, wife of Captain John Alexander. The land was sold "for 5,200 Pounds of Tobacco and caske payd by Charles Hickes", witnessed by John Higinson and Thomas Elsey. The deed was recorded in Stafford County, Virginia, on 8 November 1680. Pimmit was an overseer in 1675 for William Fitzhugh (1651–1701). Fitzhugh, who immigrated to Virginia from England about 1670, was a lawyer, public official, plantation owner, and investor in land.

John Pimmit drowned in February 1688 in the Potomac River near the mouth of the stream that was named for him. ..."an Indian that founde him drowned" was paid with a matchcoat (a long woolen coat, or blanket coat). Further compensation was made to "ye old Frenchman for lookinge after ye Children [John, Margaret, and William] since their Fathers Drowninge". Seven pence was "paid to an Indian takeing 7 p & burying ye said JOHN PYMMET at ye Courts Direccon".

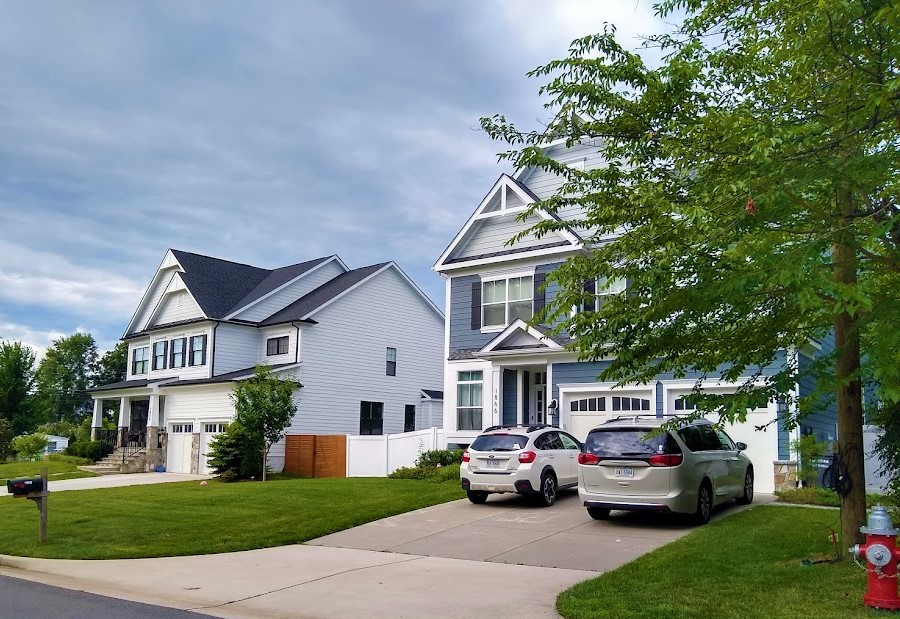
Larger homes are replacing 1950s era ramblers.

== Development ==
The area that is now Pimmit Hills was primarily farm land until the sub-division was built beginning in 1950. The houses in Pimmit Hills were mostly built during the 1950s for World War II and Korean War veterans and their families. Most of the houses were originally built as three bedroom, one bath dwellings of 833 square feet. Their initial price in 1950 was $9,950. George Offutt began construction of the first 500 Pimmit Hills houses in 1950. His Offutt Construction Company completed the first two sections by 1954. Other builders completed sections 3-6, while Offutt built sections 7 & 8 under a different company. The subdivision was fully built out by 1957-58, with 1675 homes on 663 acres. Houses are mostly single family detached dwellings, with an average property size of 1/4 acre (1,000 m²) with some third acre lots. When the homes were first built, many areas were treeless former farm fields. Decades later, the area is known for its population of large oaks, Tulip trees, and other trees.

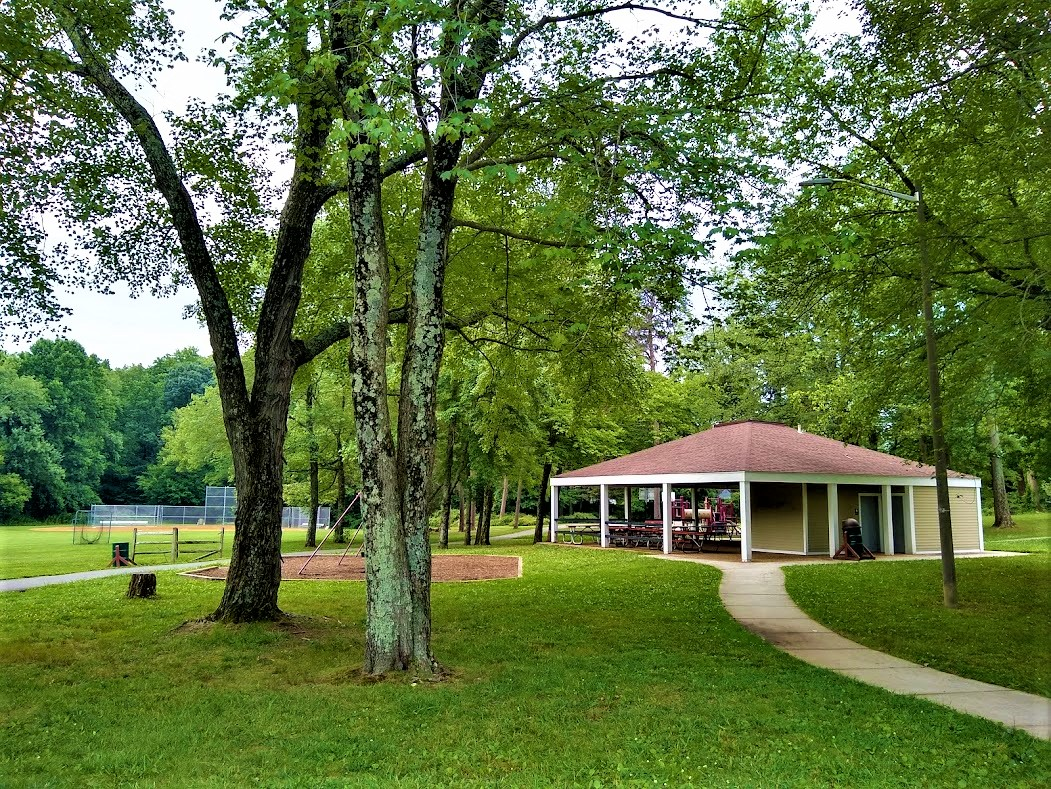
Olney Park is one of several parks with playgrounds and fields in Pimmit Hills.

Current real estate values mirror the rest of Northern Virginia, with extreme value appreciation within the last several years. The median sale price of a Pimmit Hills home was $1.5 million in October 2025, according to redfin.com, reflecting the large number of larger, new homes that replaced the original 1950s homes. Pimmit Hills abuts the emerging city of Tysons with its upscale retail, restaurants, performance venues, and businesses, including many Fortune 500 companies. It is within walking distance to the Silver Line Metro and a short distance to Washington, DC. Fairfax County offers parks, playgrounds, and year-round activities for all age groups.

Add-ons to the original one story houses, such as second floors, basements, and same-floor expansions, are common. Many new homes have been built in the neighborhood, and, on any given block, one can find several tear downs and rebuilds. This accelerated trend on tear downs is expected to continue, although many of the older houses built in the mid-1950s with less than 1000 square feet remain.

Several proposals have been presented by commercial developers to buy Pimmit properties and convert them to higher-density housing, such as condominiums or town houses, but, thus far, these have been resisted by homeowners. The comprehensive redevelopment plans for the Tysons area contemplates the preservation of the neighborhood as a community of single-family homes.

== Pimmit Barn ==
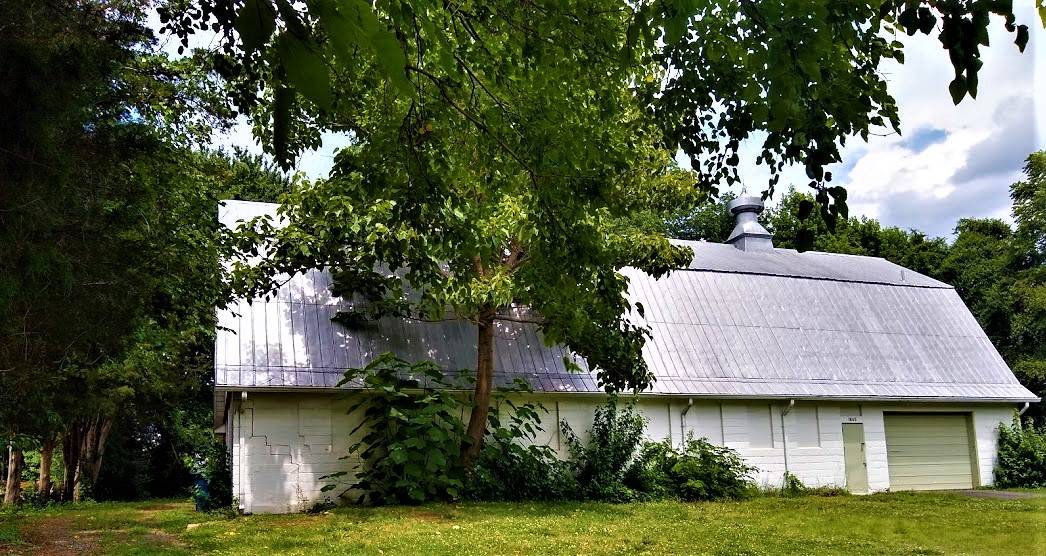
The Pimmit Barn, built in 1937, was a dairy barn on the Smith family farm in what is now Pimmit Hills.

Friends of Pimmit Barn successfully arranged with Fairfax County Parks Authority to preserve the historic building on Cherri Drive in Pimmit Hills for recreational use by the community through a Memorandum of Understanding on 9 October 2018. Since then, outdoor movies, Fall Festivals, and other events have been held there annually. Prior to the MOU, Pimmit Hills neighbors opposed "placing large industrial gas equipment at the site".

"The barn was built by Lisle Smith, who ran a dairy farm at the site for 15 years. The Fairfax County Water Authority (now called Fairfax Water) acquired the property in 1960. A well at the site was the primary water source for several hundred homes in the vicinity... The Water Authority deeded the site to the Park Authority in 1997 in exchange for a water-line easement within Cub Run Stream Valley Park"

=== Lisle Archibald Smith ===
"In 1941, Smith purchased 108 acres of land from George Johnson in Vienna, Virginia. He named the farm’s two story dwelling built in c. 1840 “Spring Glade”. This was one of three dairy farms that Smith operated including a farm in Pimmit Hills which later became the site of the Pimmit Hills neighborhood.

Smith was "a counsel for the [United States] Department of Agriculture. During the Roosevelt administration, Smith was appointed Assistant to the Attorney General, Homer Cummings. He later returned to the Department of Agriculture and retired in 1941."

== Geography ==
Pimmit Hills is located within the triangle made by the intersection of three highways: Interstate 495 (the Capital Beltway), Interstate 66, and State Route 267 (the Dulles Toll Road). Within this triangle, the actual bounds of the neighborhood are Pimmit Run, Leesburg Pike (State Route 7), and Magarity Road. Pimmit Hills is politically part of Fairfax County, and Pimmit Hills residents use Falls Church as their mailing address.

== Popular culture ==
The trailer park in the NBC sitcom My Name Is Earl is named "Pimmit Hills Trailer Park" after the neighborhood. The series creator, Greg Garcia, lived in Pimmit Hills for a time as a child.

== Demographics ==
Historical population
Census	Pop.	Note	%±
2000	6,152		—
2010	6,094		−0.9%
2020	6,569		7.8%

=== 2020 census ===
Pimmit Hills CDP, Virginia – Racial and ethnic composition Note: the US Census treats Hispanic/Latino as an ethnic category. This table excludes Latinos from the racial categories and assigns them to a separate category. Hispanics/Latinos may be of any race.
Race / Ethnicity (NH = Non-Hispanic)	Pop 2000	Pop 2010	Pop 2020	% 2000	% 2010	% 2020
White alone (NH)	4,033	3,532	3,147	65.56%	57.96%	47.91%
Black or African American alone (NH)	146	203	217	2.37%	3.33%	3.30%
Native American or Alaska Native alone (NH)	18	8	8	0.29%	0.13%	0.12%
Asian alone (NH)	705	924	1,589	11.46%	15.16%	24.19%
Native Hawaiian or Pacific Islander alone (NH)	9	7	1	0.15%	0.11%	0.02%
Other race alone (NH)	22	21	45	0.36%	0.34%	0.69%
Mixed race or Multiracial (NH)	194	186	369	3.15%	3.05%	5.62%
Hispanic or Latino (any race)	1,025	1,213	1,193	16.66%	19.90%	18.16%
Total	6,152	6,094	6,569	100.00%	100.00%	100.00%

As of the 2020 Census, the population was 6,569.

The U.S. Census Bureau listed these statistics 1 April 2020: Age and Sex

- Persons under 5 years 6.3%;
- Persons under 18 years 23.5%;
- Persons 65 years and over 13.5%;
- Female persons 54%;

Race and Hispanic Origin:

- White alone 53.8%;
- Black or African American alone 2.2%;
- American Indian and Alaska Native alone 0.1%;
- Asian alone 32.5%;
- Native Hawaiian and Other Pacific Islander alone 0.0%;
- Two or More Races 1.6%;
- Hispanic or Latino 13.9%;
- White alone, not Hispanic or Latino 48.7%;

Population Characteristics:

- Veterans, 2017-2021 365;
- Foreign born persons, 2017-2021 41.2%.

== Schools and library ==
Fairfax County Public Schools is one of the largest school divisions in the United States. Students in Pimmit Hills attend these schools:

- Westgate Elementary School
- Lemon Road Elementary School
- Kilmer Middle School
- George C. Marshall High School

Fairfax County Public Library operates the Tysons-Pimmit Regional Library in the Pimmit Hills CDP, serving Pimmit Hills and Tysons Corner.
