= Virginia's 8th congressional district =

U.S. House district for Virginia

Coordinates: 38°46′46″N 77°08′23″W

- Interactive map of district boundaries since 2023
- Representative: Don Beyer; D–Alexandria
- Distribution: 99.71% urban; 0.29% rural
- Population (2025): 783,719
- Median household income: $139,624
- Ethnicity: 49.4% White; 20.5% Hispanic; 12.3% Black; 12.2% Asian; 4.8% Two or more races; 0.8% other
- Cook PVI: D+26

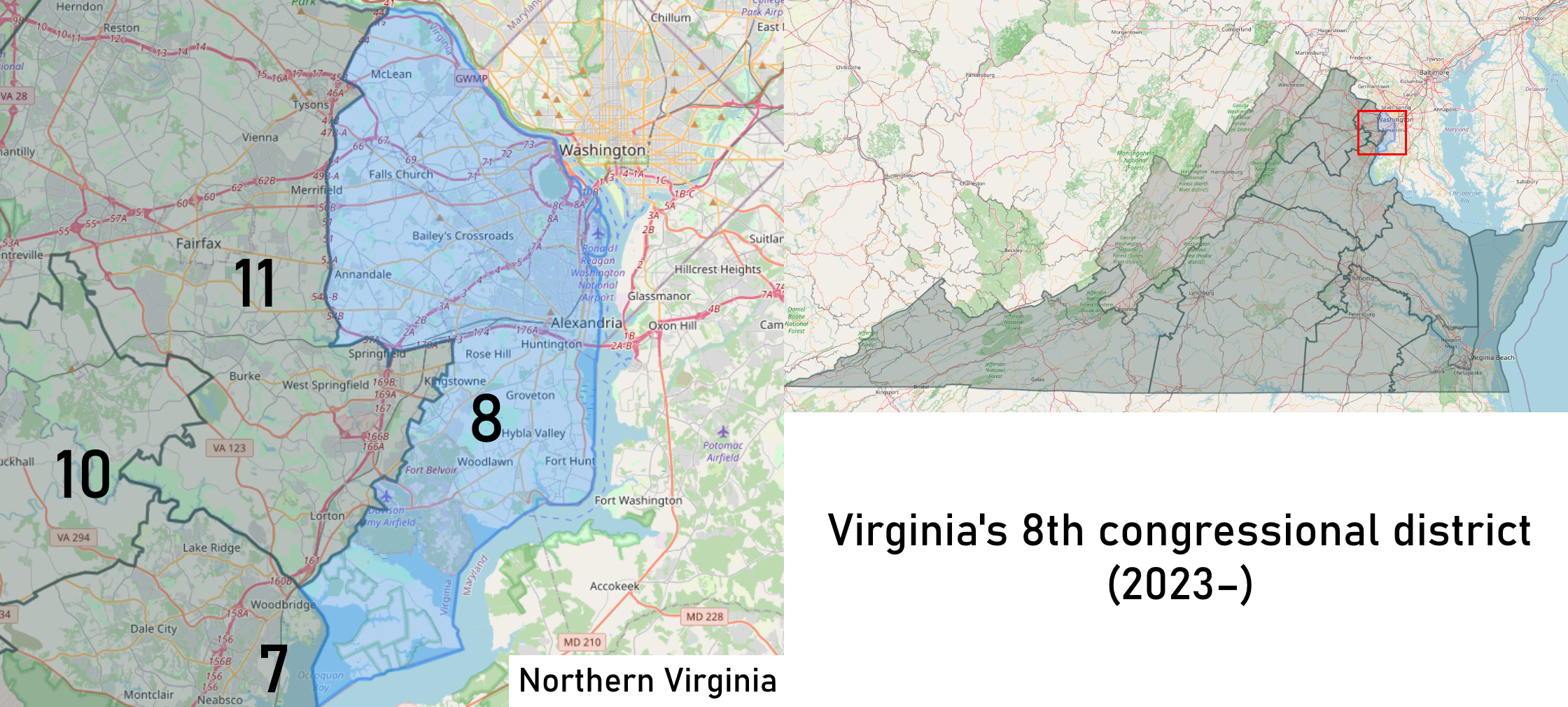
Virginia's 8th congressional district from January 3, 2023

Virginia's 8th congressional district is a U.S. congressional district located just across the Potomac River from Washington, D.C. It comprises several populous cities and suburbs in Northern Virginia, including all of Alexandria, Arlington, and Falls Church, as well as parts of eastern Fairfax County. It has been represented by Democrat Don Beyer since 2015. With a Cook Partisan Voting Index rating of D+26, it is the most Democratic district in Virginia.

The 8th district is heavily influenced by the federal government in neighboring Washington, with nearly a quarter of its working population employed in the public sector. Though commuting into the nation's capital for work is common, several government agencies have their headquarters in the 8th district. The most prominent of these are the United States Department of Defense (located in the Pentagon) and the Central Intelligence Agency. Their presence has established a flourishing aerospace and defense industry in the area, with Northrop Grumman being one of the district's top private sector employers. Other major corporations are also located within its boundaries, most notably AES.

The seat has long been a liberal stronghold, having backed every Democratic presidential nominee since 1992. However, those margins have grown dramatically; in 2020, Joe Biden carried the 8th district by over 55 points. Once a popular destination for white flight, the district has seen an influx of Asian, Black, and Hispanic residents in recent years and is now majority nonwhite. It also has the nation's fifth-highest share of individuals with a bachelor's degree or higher, in large part due to the nearby government presence.

== Recent election results from statewide races ==
Year	Office	Results
2008	President	Obama 68% - 31%
2008	Senate	Warner 74% - 25%
2009	Governor	Deeds 60% - 40%
2009	Lt. Governor	Wagner 62% - 38%
2009	Attorney General	Shannon 62% - 38%
2012	President	Obama 67% - 31%
2012	Senate	Kaine 69% - 31%
2013	Governor	McAuliffe 68% - 27%
2013	Lt. Governor	Northam 73% - 36%
2013	Attorney General	Herring 70% - 29%
2014	Senate	Warner 67% - 31%
2016	President	Clinton 72% - 21%
2017	Governor	Northam 76% - 23%
2017	Lt. Governor	Fairfax 75% - 25%
2017	Attorney General	Herring 75% - 25%
2018	Senate	Kaine 78% - 19%
2020	President	Biden 77% - 21%
2020	Senate	Warner 76% - 24%
2021	Governor	McAuliffe 72% - 27%
2021	Lt. Governor	Ayala 73% - 27%
2021	Attorney General	Herring 73% - 27%
2024	President	Harris 73% - 24%
2024	Senate	Kaine 75% - 25%
2025	Governor	Spanberger 80% - 20%
2025	Lt. Governor	Hashmi 78% - 22%
2025	Attorney General	Jones 74% - 25%

== Demographics ==
As of 2000, the district has 643,503 residents, 13.7% are African American, 9.5% are Asian, 16.4% are Hispanic and 64.5% are white.

Virginia's eighth congressional district is traditionally a Democratic stronghold, most notably in the urban communities of Arlington and Alexandria.

== Composition ==
For the 118th and successive Congresses (based on redistricting following the 2020 census), the district contains all or portions of the following counties and communities:

Arlington County (1)

Arlington

Fairfax County (24)

Annandale, Bailey's Crossroads, Belle Haven, Fort Belvoir, Fort Hunt, Franconia (part; also 11th), Groveton, Hayfield, Huntington, Hybla Valley, Idylwood, Kingstowne, Lake Barcroft, Lincolnia, Mason Neck, McLean (part; also 11th), Mount Vernon, North Springfield, Pimmit Hills, Rose Hill, Seven Corners, Springfield (part; also 11th), West Falls Church, Woodlawn

Independent cities (2)

Alexandria, Falls Church

== Elections since 1960 ==
=== 1960s ===
Virginia's 8th congressional district election, 1960
Party	Candidate	Votes	%
Democratic	Howard W. Smith (inc.)	42,809	75.7
Republican	Lawrence M. Traylor	13,410	23.7
Write-ins		364	0.6
Total votes		56,583	100.00
Democratic hold			

Virginia's 8th congressional district election, 1962
Party	Candidate	Votes	%
Democratic	Howard W. Smith (inc.)	20,931	98.7
Write-ins		267	1.3
Total votes		21,198	100.00
Democratic hold			

Virginia's 8th congressional district election, 1964
Party	Candidate	Votes	%
Democratic	Howard W. Smith (inc.)	49,440	69.4
Independent	Floyd Caldwell Bagley	21,813	30.6
Write-ins		4	<0.1
Total votes		71,257	100.00
Democratic hold			

Virginia's 8th congressional district election, 1966
Party	Candidate	Votes	%
Republican	William L. Scott	50,782	57.2
Democratic	George Rawlings	37,929	42.7
Write-ins		21	<0.1
Total votes		88,732	100.00
Republican gain from Democratic			

Virginia's 8th congressional district election, 1968
Party	Candidate	Votes	%
Republican	William L. Scott (inc.)	68,167	64.9
Democratic	Andrew H. McCutcheon	49,731	35.1
Write-ins		1	<0.1
Total votes		141,853	100.00
Republican hold			

=== 1970s ===
Virginia's 8th congressional district election, 1970
Party	Candidate	Votes	%
Republican	William L. Scott (inc.)	68,167	63.8
Democratic	Darrell Stearns	38,680	36.2
Write-ins		8	<0.1
Total votes		106,855	100.00
Republican hold			

Virginia's 8th congressional district election, 1972
Party	Candidate	Votes	%
Republican	Stanford Parris	60,446	44.4
Democratic	Robert F. Horan	51,444	37.8
Independent	William Durland	18,654	13.7
Independent	Robert E. Harris	5,553	4.1
Write-ins		2	<0.1
Total votes		136,099	100.00
Republican hold			

Virginia's 8th congressional district election, 1974
Party	Candidate	Votes	%
Democratic	Herbert Harris	53,074	57.6
Republican	Stanford Parris (inc.)	38,997	42.4
Write-ins		11	<0.1
Total votes		92,082	100.00
Democratic gain from Republican			

Virginia's 8th congressional district election, 1976
Party	Candidate	Votes	%
Democratic	Herbert Harris (inc.)	83,245	51.6
Republican	James R. Tate	68,729	42.6
Independent	Michael D. Cannon	9,292	5.8
Write-ins		61	<0.1
Total votes		161,327	100.00
Democratic hold			

Virginia's 8th congressional district election, 1978
Party	Candidate	Votes	%
Democratic	Herbert Harris (inc.)	56,137	50.5
Republican	Jack Herrity	52,396	47.1
Independent	Charles Coe	2,632	2.4
Write-ins		5	<0.1
Total votes		111,170	100.00
Democratic hold			

=== 1980s ===
Virginia's 8th congressional district election, 1980
Party	Candidate	Votes	%
Republican	Stanford Parris	95,624	48.8
Democratic	Herbert Harris (inc.)	94,530	48.3
Independent	Deborah Frantz	5,729	2.9
Write-ins		14	<0.1
Total votes		195,897	100.00
Republican gain from Democratic			

Virginia's 8th congressional district election, 1982
Party	Candidate	Votes	%
Republican	Stanford Parris (inc.)	69,620	49.7
Democratic	Herbert Harris	68,071	48.6
Independent	Austin Morrill	2,373	1.7
Write-ins		6	<0.1
Total votes		140,070	100.00
Republican hold			

Virginia's 8th congressional district election, 1984
Party	Candidate	Votes	%
Republican	Stanford Parris (inc.)	125,015	55.8
Democratic	Richard L. Saslaw	97,250	43.4
Independent	Donald W. Carpenter	1,814	0.8
Write-ins		12	<0.1
Total votes		224,091	100.00
Republican hold			

Virginia's 8th congressional district election, 1986
Party	Candidate	Votes	%
Republican	Stanford Parris (inc.)	72,670	61.8
Democratic	James H. Boren	44,965	38.2
Write-ins		20	<0.1
Total votes		117,655	100.00
Republican hold			

Virginia's 8th congressional district election, 1988
Party	Candidate	Votes	%
Republican	Stanford Parris (inc.)	154,761	62.3
Democratic	David Brickley	93,561	37.7
Write-ins		78	<0.1
Total votes		248,400	100.00
Republican hold			

=== 1990s ===
Virginia's 8th congressional district election, 1990
Party	Candidate	Votes	%
Democratic	Jim Moran	88,475	51.7
Republican	Stanford Parris (inc.)	76,367	44.6
Independent	Robert Murphy	5,958	3.5
Write-ins		321	0.2
Total votes		171,121	100.00
Democratic gain from Republican			

Virginia's 8th congressional district election, 1992
Party	Candidate	Votes	%
Democratic	Jim Moran (inc.)	138,542	56.1
Republican	Kyle E. McSlarrow	102,717	41.6
Independent	Alvin West	5,601	2.3
Write-ins		266	0.1
Total votes		247,126	100.00
Democratic hold			

Virginia's 8th congressional district election, 1994
Party	Candidate	Votes	%
Democratic	Jim Moran (inc.)	120,281	59.3
Republican	Kyle E. McSlarrow	79,568	39.3
Independent	R. Ward Edmonds	1,858	0.9
Independent	William Jones	868	0.4
Write-ins		98	<0.1
Total votes		202,673	100.00
Democratic hold			

Virginia's 8th congressional district election, 1996
Party	Candidate	Votes	%
Democratic	Jim Moran (inc.)	152,334	66.4
Republican	John Otey	64,562	28.1
Reform	R. Ward Edmonds	6,243	2.7
Independent	Sarina Grosswald	5,239	2.3
Independent	Charles Severance	740	0.3
Write-ins		303	0.1
Total votes		229,421	100.00
Democratic hold			

Virginia's 8th congressional district election, 1998
Party	Candidate	Votes	%
Democratic	Jim Moran (inc.)	97,545	66.7
Republican	Demaris H. Miller	48,352	33.1
Write-ins		390	0.3
Total votes		146,287	100.00
Democratic hold			

=== 2000s ===
Virginia's 8th congressional district election, 2000
Party	Candidate	Votes	%
Democratic	Jim Moran (inc.)	164,178	63.3
Republican	Demaris H. Miller	88,262	34.1
Independent	Ronald V. Crickenberger	3,483	1.3
Independent	Rick Herron	2,805	1.1
Write-ins		471	0.2
Total votes		259,199	100.00
Democratic hold			

Virginia's 8th congressional district election, 2002
Party	Candidate	Votes	%
Democratic	Jim Moran (inc.)	102,759	59.8
Republican	Scott C. Tate	64,121	37.3
Independent	Ronald V. Crickenberger	4,558	2.7
Write-ins		361	0.2
Total votes		171,799	100.00
Democratic hold			

Virginia's 8th congressional district election, 2004
Party	Candidate	Votes	%
Democratic	Jim Moran (inc.)	171,986	59.7
Republican	Lisa Marie Cheney	106,231	36.9
Independent	Jim Hurysz	9,004	3.1
Write-ins		698	0.2
Total votes		287,919	100.00
Democratic hold			

Virginia's 8th congressional district election, 2006
Party	Candidate	Votes	%
Democratic	Jim Moran (inc.)	144,700	66.4
Republican	Tom M. O'Donoghue	66,639	30.6
Independent	Jim Hurysz	6,094	2.8
Write-ins		476	0.2
Total votes		217,909	100.00
Democratic hold			

Virginia's 8th congressional district election, 2008
Party	Candidate	Votes	%
Democratic	Jim Moran (inc.)	222,986	67.9
Republican	Mark W. Ellmore	97,425	29.7
Independent Greens	J. Ron Fisher	6,829	2.1
Other	Write-in candidates	957	0.3
Total votes		328,197	100
Democratic hold			

=== 2010s ===
Virginia's 8th congressional district election, 2010
Party	Candidate	Votes	%
Democratic	Jim Moran (inc.)	116,293	61.0
Republican	Jay Patrick Murray	71,108	37.3
Independent Greens	J. Ron Fisher	2,704	1.4
Other	Write-in candidates	492	0.2
Total votes		233,368	100
Turnout		233,368 of 476,011	49.0
Democratic hold			

Virginia's 8th Congressional District election, 2012
Party	Candidate	Votes	%
Democratic	Jim Moran (inc.)	226,847	64.6
Republican	Jay Patrick Murray	107,370	30.6
Independent	Jason Howell	10,180	2.9
Independent Greens	Janet Murphy	5,985	1.7
Write-in		805	0.2
Total votes		351,187	100
Democratic hold			

Virginia's 8th Congressional District election, 2014
Party	Candidate	Votes	%
Democratic	Don Beyer	128,102	63.1
Republican	Micah Edmond	63,810	31.4
Independent	Gwendolyn Beck	5,420	2.7
Libertarian	Jeffrey Carson	4,409	2.2
Independent Greens	Gerry Blais	963	0.5
Write-in		372	0.2
Total votes		203,076	100
Democratic hold			

Virginia's 8th congressional district election, 2016
Party	Candidate	Votes	%
Democratic	Don Beyer (inc.)	246 653	68.4
Republican	Charles A. Hernick	98,387	27.3
Independent	Julio Gracia	14,664	4.0
Write-ins		972	0.2
Total votes		360,676	100
Democratic hold			

Virginia's 8th congressional district election, 2018
Party	Candidate	Votes	%
Democratic	Don Beyer (inc.)	247,137	76.1
Republican	Thomas Oh	76,899	23.7
Write-ins		712	0.2
Turnout		324,748	54.6
Total votes		324,748	100
Democratic hold			

=== 2020s ===
Virginia's 8th congressional district election, 2020
Party	Candidate	Votes	%
Democratic	Don Beyer (inc.)	301,454	75.8
Republican	Jeff Jordan	95,365	24.0
Write-in		926	0.2
Total votes		397,745	100
Democratic hold			

Virginia's 8th congressional district election, 2022
Party	Candidate	Votes	%
Democratic	Don Beyer (inc.)	197,760	73.5
Republican	Karina Lipsman	66,589	24.8
Independent	Teddy Fikre	4,078	1.5
Write-in		503	0.2
Total votes		268,930	100
Democratic hold			

Virginia's 8th congressional district election, 2024
Party	Candidate	Votes	%
Democratic	Don Beyer (inc.)	274,593	71.52
Republican	Jerry Torres	94,676	24.66
Independent	David Kennedy	9,956	2.59
Independent	Bentley Hensel	3,656	0.95
Write-in		1,034	0.27
Total votes		383,915	100

== List of members representing the district ==
Representative	Party	Years	Cong ress	Electoral history
District established March 4, 1789
Josiah Parker (Macclesfield)	Anti-Administration	March 4, 1789 – March 3, 1793	1st 2nd	Elected in 1789. Re-elected in 1790. Elected to Virginia 11th District
Thomas Claiborne (Brunswick County)	Anti-Administration	March 4, 1793 – March 3, 1795	3rd 4th 5th	Elected in 1793. Re-elected in 1795. Re-elected in 1797. Lost re-election.
Thomas Claiborne (Brunswick County)	Democratic-Republican	March 4, 1795 – March 3, 1799	3rd 4th 5th	Elected in 1793. Re-elected in 1795. Re-elected in 1797. Lost re-election.
Samuel Goode (Chesterfield County)	Democratic-Republican	March 4, 1799 – March 3, 1801	6th	Elected in 1799. [data missing]
Thomas Claiborne (Brunswick County)	Democratic-Republican	March 4, 1801 – March 3, 1803	7th	Elected in 1801. Redistricted to the 17th district.
Walter Jones (Hayfield)	Democratic-Republican	March 4, 1803 – March 3, 1811	8th 9th 10th 11th	Elected in 1803. Re-elected in 1805. Re-elected in 1807. Re-elected in 1809. Retired.
John Hungerford (Leedstown)	Democratic-Republican	March 4, 1811 – November 29, 1811	12th	Elected in 1811. Lost election contest.
John Taliaferro (Fredericksburg)	Democratic-Republican	November 29, 1811 – March 3, 1813	12th	Won election contest. Redistricted to the 9th district and lost re-election.
Joseph Lewis Jr. (Upperville)	Federalist	March 4, 1813 – March 3, 1817	13th 14th	Redistricted from the 7th district and re-elected in 1813. Re-elected in 1815. Retired.
Charles F. Mercer (Aldie)	Federalist	March 4, 1817 – March 3, 1823	15th 16th 17th	Elected in 1817. Re-elected in 1819. Re-elected in 1821. Redistricted to the 14th district.
Burwell Bassett (Williamsburg)	Democratic-Republican (Crawford)	March 4, 1823 – March 3, 1825	18th 19th 20th	Redistricted from the 13th district and re-elected in 1823. Re-elected in 1825. Re-elected in 1827. Lost re-election.
Burwell Bassett (Williamsburg)	Jackson	March 4, 1825 – March 3, 1829	18th 19th 20th	Redistricted from the 13th district and re-elected in 1823. Re-elected in 1825. Re-elected in 1827. Lost re-election.
Richard Coke Jr. (Williamsburg)	Jackson	March 4, 1829 – March 3, 1833	21st 22nd	Elected in 1829. Re-elected in 1831. Retired.
Henry A. Wise (Accomac)	Jackson	March 4, 1833 – March 3, 1837	23rd 24th 25th 26th 27th	Elected in 1833. Re-elected in 1835. Re-elected in 1837. Re-elected in 1839. Re-elected in 1841. Redistricted to the 7th district.
Henry A. Wise (Accomac)	Whig	March 4, 1837 – March 3, 1843	23rd 24th 25th 26th 27th	Elected in 1833. Re-elected in 1835. Re-elected in 1837. Re-elected in 1839. Re-elected in 1841. Redistricted to the 7th district.
Willoughby Newton (Hague)	Whig	March 4, 1843 – March 3, 1845	28th	Elected in 1843. Lost re-election.
Robert M. T. Hunter (Lloyds)	Whig	March 4, 1845 – March 3, 1847	29th	Elected in 1845. Elected to U.S. Senate
Richard L. T. Beale (Hague)	Democratic	March 4, 1847 – March 3, 1849	30th	Elected in 1847. Retired.
Alexander R. Holladay (Mansfield)	Democratic	March 4, 1849 – March 3, 1853	31st 32nd	Elected in 1849. Re-elected in 1851. Retired.
Charles J. Faulkner, Sr. (Martinsburg)	Democratic	March 4, 1853 – March 3, 1859	33rd 34th 35th	Elected in 1853. Re-elected in 1855. Re-elected in 1857. Appointed Minister to France.
Alexander R. Boteler (Shepherdstown)	Opposition	March 4, 1859 – March 3, 1861	36th	Elected in 1859. Retired.
District inactive		March 4, 1861 – January 28, 1870	37th 38th 39th 40th 41st	Civil War and Reconstruction
James K. Gibson (Abingdon)	Conservative	January 28, 1870 – March 3, 1871	41st	Elected in 1870. Retired.
William Terry (Wytheville)	Democratic	March 4, 1871 – March 3, 1873	42nd	Elected in 1870. Lost re-election.
Eppa Hunton (Warrenton)	Democratic	March 4, 1873 – March 3, 1881	43rd 44th 45th 46th	Elected in 1872. Re-elected in 1874. Re-elected in 1876. Re-elected in 1878. Retired.
John S. Barbour Jr. (Alexandria)	Democratic	March 4, 1881 – March 3, 1887	47th 48th 49th	Elected in 1880. Re-elected in 1882. Re-elected in 1884. Retired.
William H. F. Lee (Ravensworth)	Democratic	March 4, 1887 – October 15, 1891	50th 51st 52nd	Elected in 1886. Re-elected in 1888. Re-elected in 1890. Died.
Vacant		October 16, 1891 – December 8, 1891	52nd	
Elisha E. Meredith (Brentsville)	Democratic	December 9, 1891 – March 3, 1897	52nd 53rd 54th	Elected to finish Lee's term. Re-elected in 1892. Re-elected in 1894. Retired.
John F. Rixey (Brandy)	Democratic	March 4, 1897 – February 8, 1907	55th 56th 57th 58th 59th	Elected in 1896. Re-elected in 1898. Re-elected in 1900. Re-elected in 1902. Re-elected in 1904. Re-elected in 1906. Died.
Vacant		February 9, 1907 – November 4, 1907	59th 60th	
Charles C. Carlin (Alexandria)	Democratic	November 5, 1907 – March 3, 1919	60th 61st 62nd 63rd 64th 65th	Elected to finish Rixley's term. Re-elected in 1908. Re-elected in 1910. Re-elected in 1912. Re-elected in 1914. Re-elected in 1916. Re-elected in 1918. Resigned.
Vacant		March 4, 1919 – April 26, 1919	66th	
R. Walton Moore (Fairfax)	Democratic	April 27, 1919 – March 3, 1931	66th 67th 68th 69th 70th 71st	Elected to finish Carlin's term. Re-elected in 1920. Re-elected in 1922. Re-elected in 1924. Re-elected in 1926. Re-elected in 1928. Retired.
Howard W. Smith (Alexandria)	Democratic	March 4, 1931 – March 3, 1933	72nd	Elected in 1930. Redistricted to the at-large seat.
District inactive		March 4, 1933 – January 3, 1935	73rd	
Howard W. Smith (Broad Run)	Democratic	January 3, 1935 – January 3, 1967	74th 75th 76th 77th 78th 79th 80th 81st 82nd 83rd 84th 85th 86th 87th 88th 89th	Redistricted from the at-large seat and re-elected in 1934. Re-elected in 1936. Re-elected in 1938. Re-elected in 1940. Re-elected in 1942. Re-elected in 1944. Re-elected in 1946. Re-elected in 1948. Re-elected in 1950. Re-elected in 1952. Re-elected in 1954. Re-elected in 1956. Re-elected in 1958. Re-elected in 1960. Re-elected in 1962. Re-elected in 1964. Lost re-election.
William L. Scott (Fairfax)	Republican	January 3, 1967 – January 3, 1973	90th 91st 92nd	Elected in 1966. Re-elected in 1968. Re-elected in 1970. Elected to U.S. Senate.
Stanford Parris (Fairfax Station)	Republican	January 3, 1973 – January 3, 1975	93rd	Elected in 1972. Lost re-election.
Herbert E. Harris (Alexandria)	Democratic	January 3, 1975 – January 3, 1981	94th 95th 96th	Elected in 1974. Re-elected in 1976. Re-elected in 1978. Lost re-election.
Stanford Parris (Fairfax Station)	Republican	January 3, 1981 – January 3, 1991	97th 98th 99th 100th 101st	Elected in 1980. Re-elected in 1982. Re-elected in 1984. Re-elected in 1986. Re-elected in 1988. Lost re-election.
Jim Moran (Arlington)	Democratic	January 3, 1991 – January 3, 2015	102nd 103rd 104th 105th 106th 107th 108th 109th 110th 111th 112th 113th	Elected in 1990. Re-elected in 1992. Re-elected in 1994. Re-elected in 1996. Re-elected in 1998. Re-elected in 2000. Re-elected in 2002. Re-elected in 2004. Re-elected in 2006. Re-elected in 2008. Re-elected in 2010. Re-elected in 2012. Retired.
Don Beyer (Alexandria)	Democratic	January 3, 2015 – present	114th 115th 116th 117th 118th 119th	Elected in 2014. Re-elected in 2016. Re-elected in 2018. Re-elected in 2020. Re-elected in 2022. Re-elected in 2024. Re-elected in 2026.

== Historical district boundaries ==
The Virginia Eighth District started in 1788 covering the counties of Norfolk, Accomack, Northampton, Princess Anne, Nansemond, Isle of Wight, Surry and Southampton.

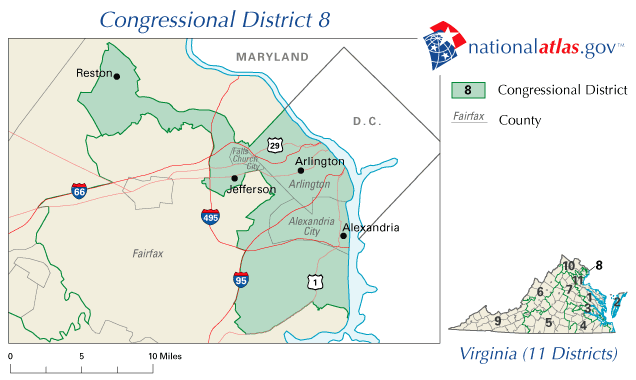
2003–2013

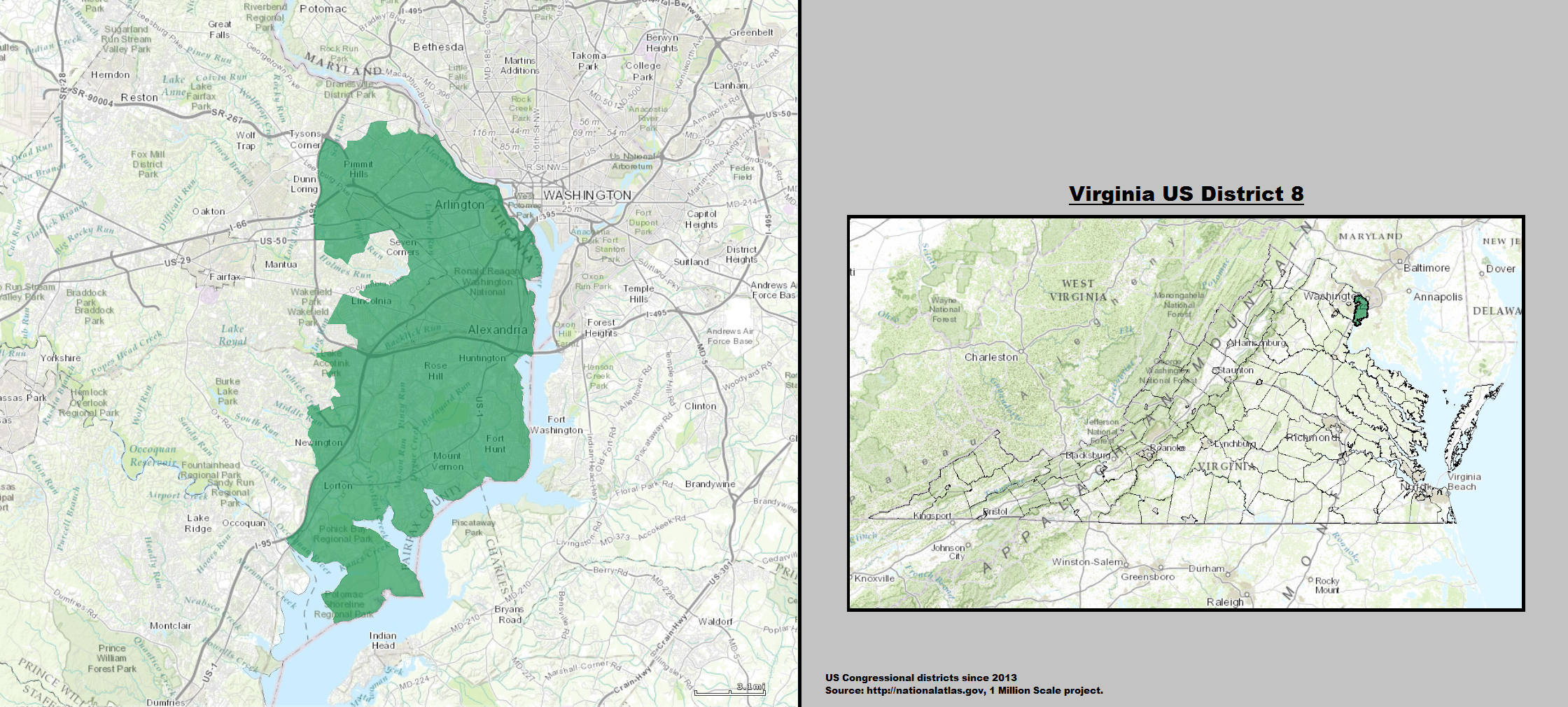
2013–2023

== See also ==
- Virginia's congressional districts
- List of United States congressional districts
