= Groveton =

Groveton may refer to a community in the United States:

- Groveton, New Hampshire
- Groveton, Texas
- Groveton, Virginia
