= Hayfield, Virginia =

Hayfield, Virginia is the name of:

- Hayfield, Fairfax County, Virginia
- Hayfield, Frederick County, Virginia
