= Laurel Grove Colored School and Church =

School and church in Franconia, Virginia (1880s–?)

- Laurel Grove School Museum; Laurel Grove Baptist Church; Laurel Grove Cemetery
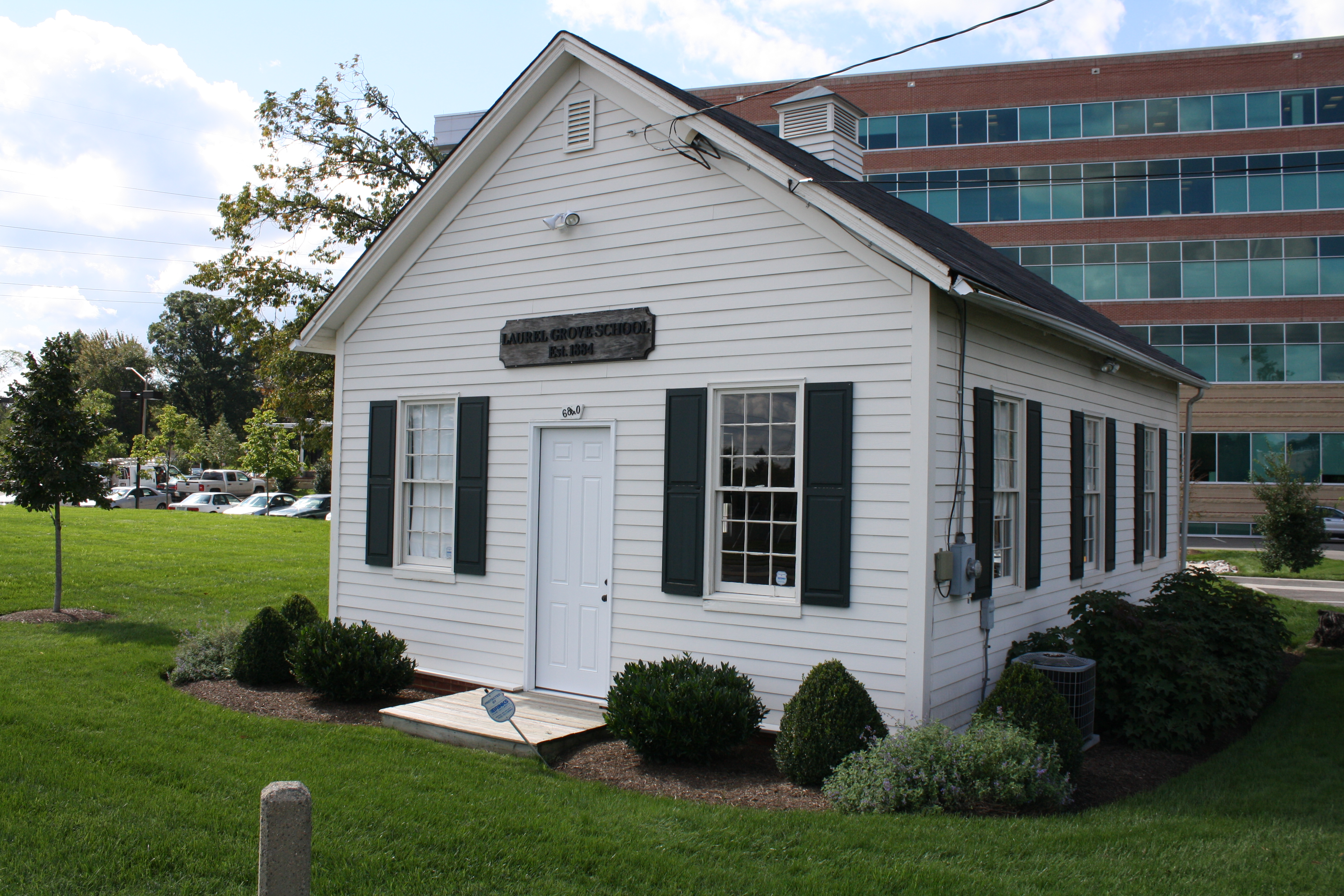
- Laurel Grove Colored School and Church
- 38.7683°N 77.15505°W
- Location: Beulah Street, Franconia, Virginia, U.S.
- Religious institute: Baptist

History
- Founded: early 1880s

Architecture
- Closed: 1932 (school)

The Laurel Grove Colored School and Church was a congregation founded by former enslaved African Americans in the 1880s in Franconia, Virginia. It is the only African American schoolhouse preserved in Northern Virginia. The school closed in 1932 and is now a museum called the Laurel Grove School Museum, and the church was known as the Laurel Grove Baptist Church.

== History ==
The land was originally part of a 13 acres (5.3 ha) farm belonging to freed slaves Georgiana and William Jasper. The church site was deeded in 1881 to the Virginia School System by the Jaspers for $10. The church site was located at 6834 Beulah Street.

In 1884, the couple provided another half-acre for a one room school to be built next to the church. The school educated black students aged 6 to 14, from 1886 to 1932. It was part of the Fairfax County Public Schools system until 1933.

== Modern history ==
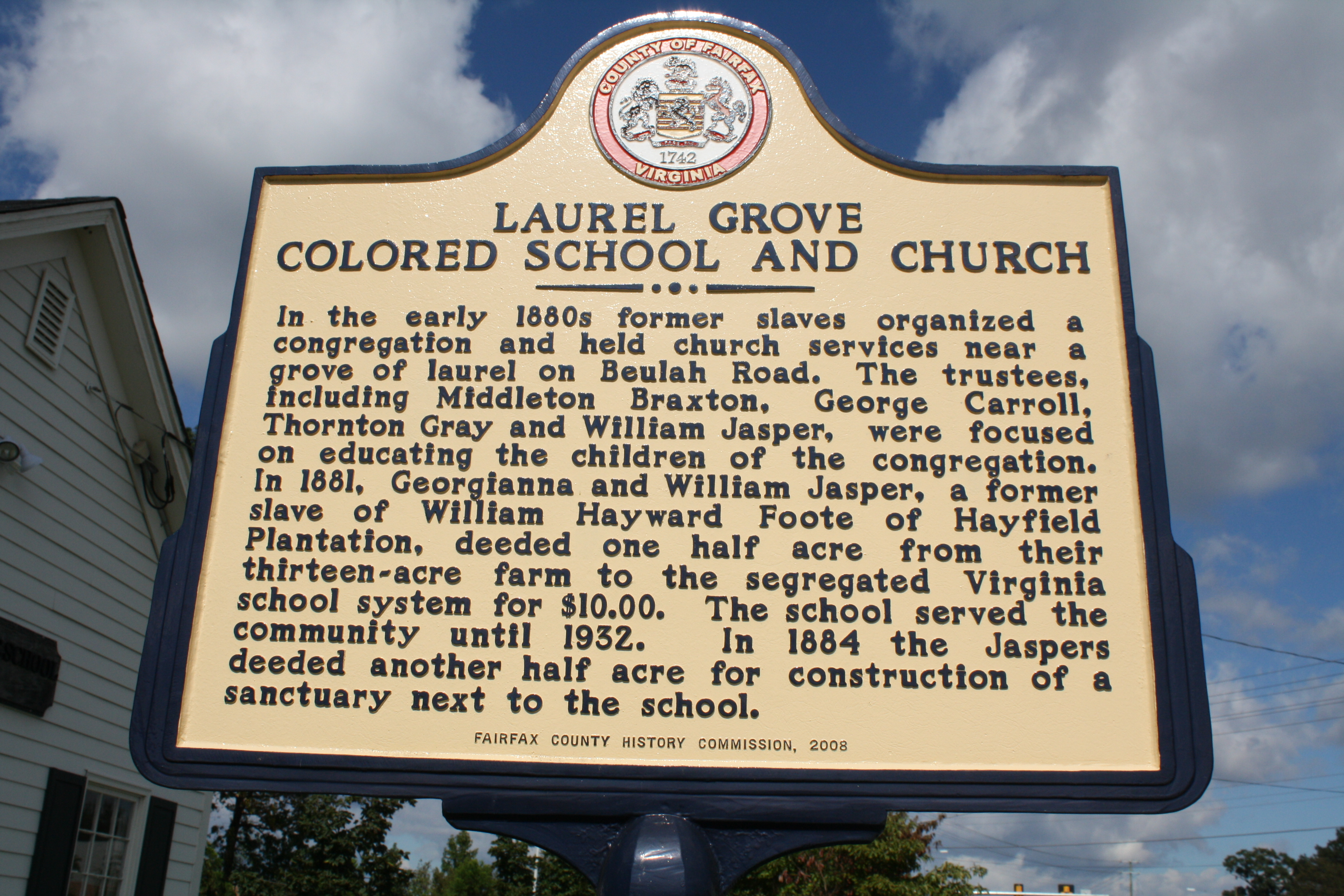
Laurel Grove School and Church historical marker

The school became a living museum, the Laurel Grove School Museum, which has been open to the public since 2003 through the Laurel Grove School Association. It is staged as a 1920s school room.

The Laurel Grove Baptist Church building stood until being destroyed by an electrical fire in December 2004.

The church cemetery still exists, as does the school building, which was honored in 2008 with the erection of a historical marker by the Fairfax County History Commission.
