= Hayfield, Fairfax County, Virginia =

- Census-designated place
- Hayfield
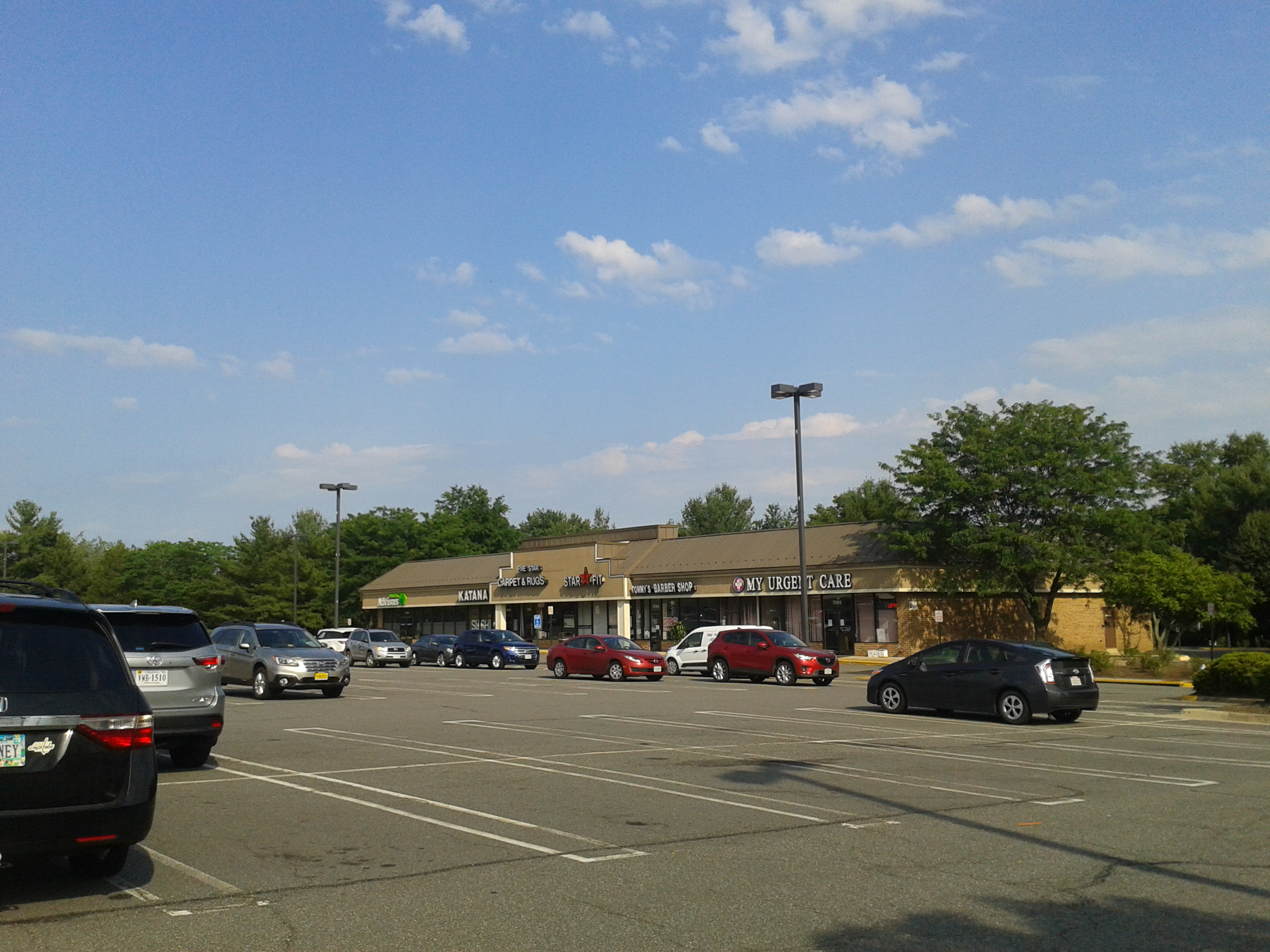
- Shops at the Hayfield Shopping Center
- Nickname: Hayfield Farm
- Location within Northern Virginia Location within Virginia Location within the United States
- Coordinates: 38°45′6″N 77°8′22″W
- Country: United States
- State: Virginia
- County: Fairfax

Area
  - Total: 1.4 sq mi (3.6 km^{2})
  - Land: 1.3 sq mi (3.3 km^{2})
  - Water: 0.12 sq mi (0.3 km^{2})
- Elevation: 95 ft (29 m)

Population (2010)
  - Total: 3,909
  - Density: 3,049/sq mi (1,177.2/km^{2})
- Time zone: UTC−5 (Eastern (EST))
  - Summer (DST): UTC−4 (EDT)
- ZIP Code: 22310
- FIPS code: 51-35912
- GNIS feature ID: 2584856

Hayfield is a census-designated place (CDP) in Fairfax County, Virginia, United States. The population as of the 2010 census was 3,909.

It is located in southeastern Fairfax County, bordered by Kingstowne to the northwest, Rose Hill to the north, Groveton to the east, and Fort Belvoir to the south. The main road through Hayfield is Telegraph Road, which leads northeast 5 miles (8 km) into Alexandria and southwest 4 miles (6 km) to U.S. Route 1 at Pohick.

== Geography ==
According to the U.S. Census Bureau, Hayfield has a total area of 1.4 square miles (3.6 km^{2}), 1.3 square miles (3.3 km^{2}) of which is land and 0.1 square miles (0.3 km^{2}), or 8.14%, of which is water. About a fifth of the area (199.9 acres (0.3 sq mi; 0.8 km^{2})) is taken up by the United States Coast Guard Navigation Center.

== Demographics ==
Historical population
Census	Pop.	Note	%±
2010	3,909		—
2020	4,154		6.3%
U.S. Decennial Census; 2010 2020

Hayfield was first listed as a census designated place in the 2010 U.S. census formed from part of Franconia CDP and additional area.

Hayfield CDP, Virginia – Racial and ethnic composition Note: the US Census treats Hispanic/Latino as an ethnic category. This table excludes Latinos from the racial categories and assigns them to a separate category. Hispanics/Latinos may be of any race.
Race / Ethnicity (NH = Non-Hispanic)	Pop 2010	Pop 2020	% 2010	% 2020
White alone (NH)	2,828	2,769	72.35%	66.66%
Black or African American alone (NH)	421	464	10.77%	11.17%
Native American or Alaska Native alone (NH)	8	11	0.20%	0.26%
Asian alone (NH)	243	253	6.22%	6.09%
Native Hawaiian or Pacific Islander alone (NH)	2	6	0.05%	0.14%
Other race alone (NH)	6	16	0.15%	0.39%
Mixed race or Multiracial (NH)	108	235	2.76%	5.66%
Hispanic or Latino (any race)	293	400	7.50%	9.63%
Total	3,909	4,154	100.00%	100.00%

== Education ==
Fairfax County Public Schools operates public schools. Hayfield Secondary School has served grades nine through 12 since 1968. Hayfield Elementary is located directly across Telegraph Road from the secondary school.
