= Rose Hill, Fairfax County, Virginia =

- Census-designated place
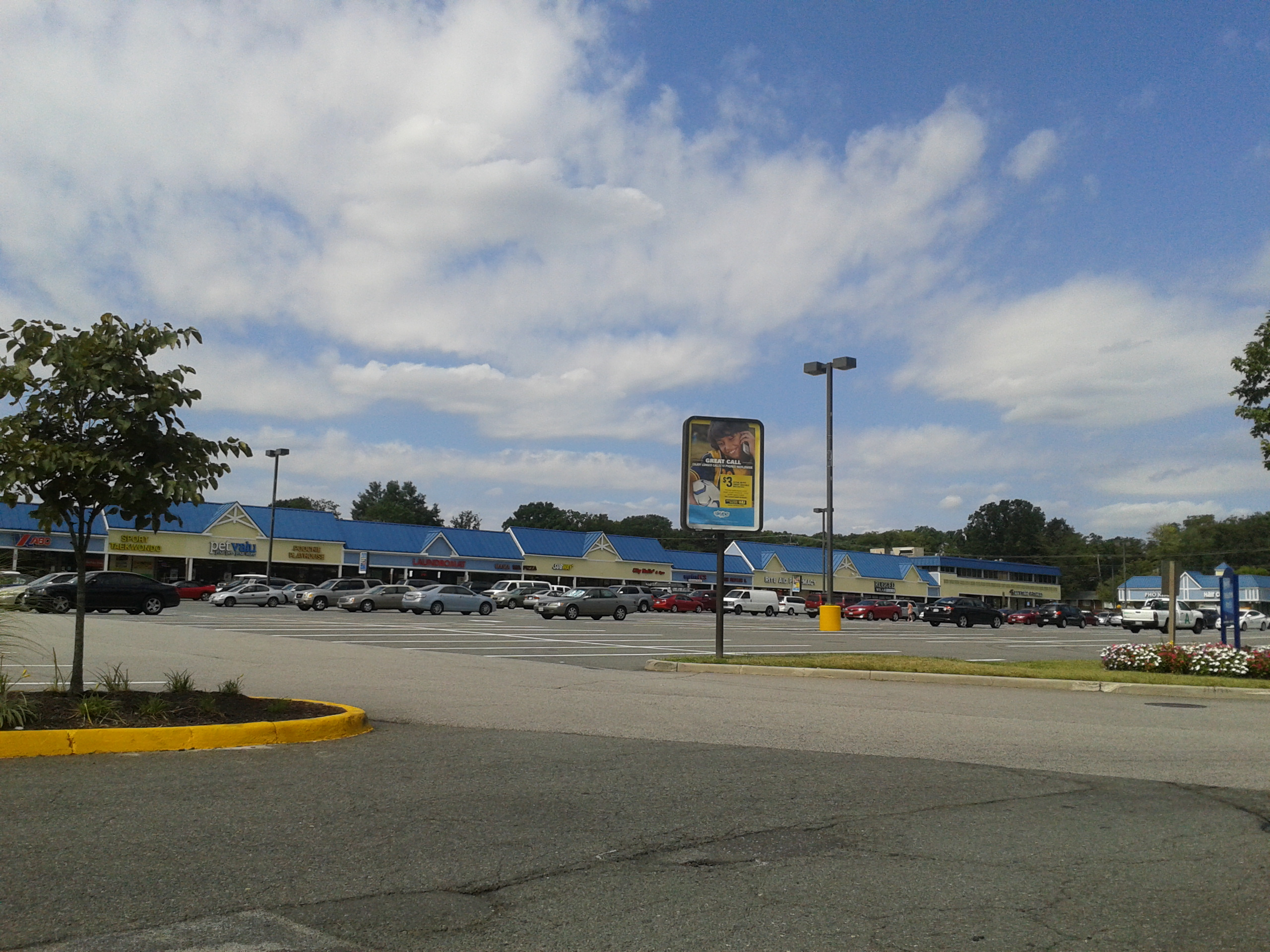
- Rose Hill Shopping Center, August 2015

- Location within Fairfax county

- Location within Northern Virginia Location within Virginia Location within the United States
- Coordinates: 38°47′21″N 77°6′32″W
- Country: United States
- State: Virginia
- County: Fairfax

Area
  - Total: 5.57 sq mi (14.43 km^{2})
  - Land: 5.56 sq mi (14.39 km^{2})
  - Water: 0.015 sq mi (0.04 km^{2})
- Elevation: 203 ft (62 m)

Population (2020)
  - Total: 21,045
  - Density: 3,640/sq mi (1,405.6/km^{2})
- Time zone: UTC−5 (Eastern (EST))
  - Summer (DST): UTC−4 (EDT)
- FIPS code: 51-68880
- GNIS feature ID: 2389774

Rose Hill is a census-designated place (CDP) in Fairfax County, Virginia, United States. The population was 20,226 at the 2010 census. Built in the mid-1950s, Rose Hill is the largest of the subdivisions that make up the CDP, which is just southwest of Alexandria; others include Wilton Woods, Burgundy Village, and Winslow Heights. Street addresses are in Alexandria ZIP codes 22310, 22303 and 22315.

== Geography ==
Rose Hill is located in southeastern Fairfax County at 38°47′21″N 77°6′32″W (38.789263, −77.108971). It is bordered to the north by the city of Alexandria, to the east by Huntington, to the south by Groveton and Hayfield, to the southwest by Kingstowne, and to the west by Franconia. The CDP's borders follow the Capital Beltway and CSX rail line on the north, South Van Dorn Street and some smaller roads on the west, South Kings Highway on the south, and Shaffer Drive and Telegraph Road on the east.

According to the United States Census Bureau, the Rose Hill CDP has a total area of 5.57 square miles (14.43 km^{2}), of which 0.02 square miles (0.04 km^{2}), or 0.28%, is water.

== History ==
The community of Rose Hill derives its name from an 18th-century plantation once located nearby; this was established by Daniel French, the first builder of Pohick Church, on land that had been part of the Gunston Hall estate. The house stood on high ground, and was described as having a fine view of the nearby valley and the Potomac River in the distance. The land had been purchased by Daniel French Sr., in 1723, passing to his son, Daniel French Jr., in 1736. At the latter's death, the property went first to his wife Penelope and then to Elizabeth Dulaney, their daughter. The Dulaneys sold the plantation early in the 1800s, and between 1810 and 1868 it passed through the hands of numerous owners.

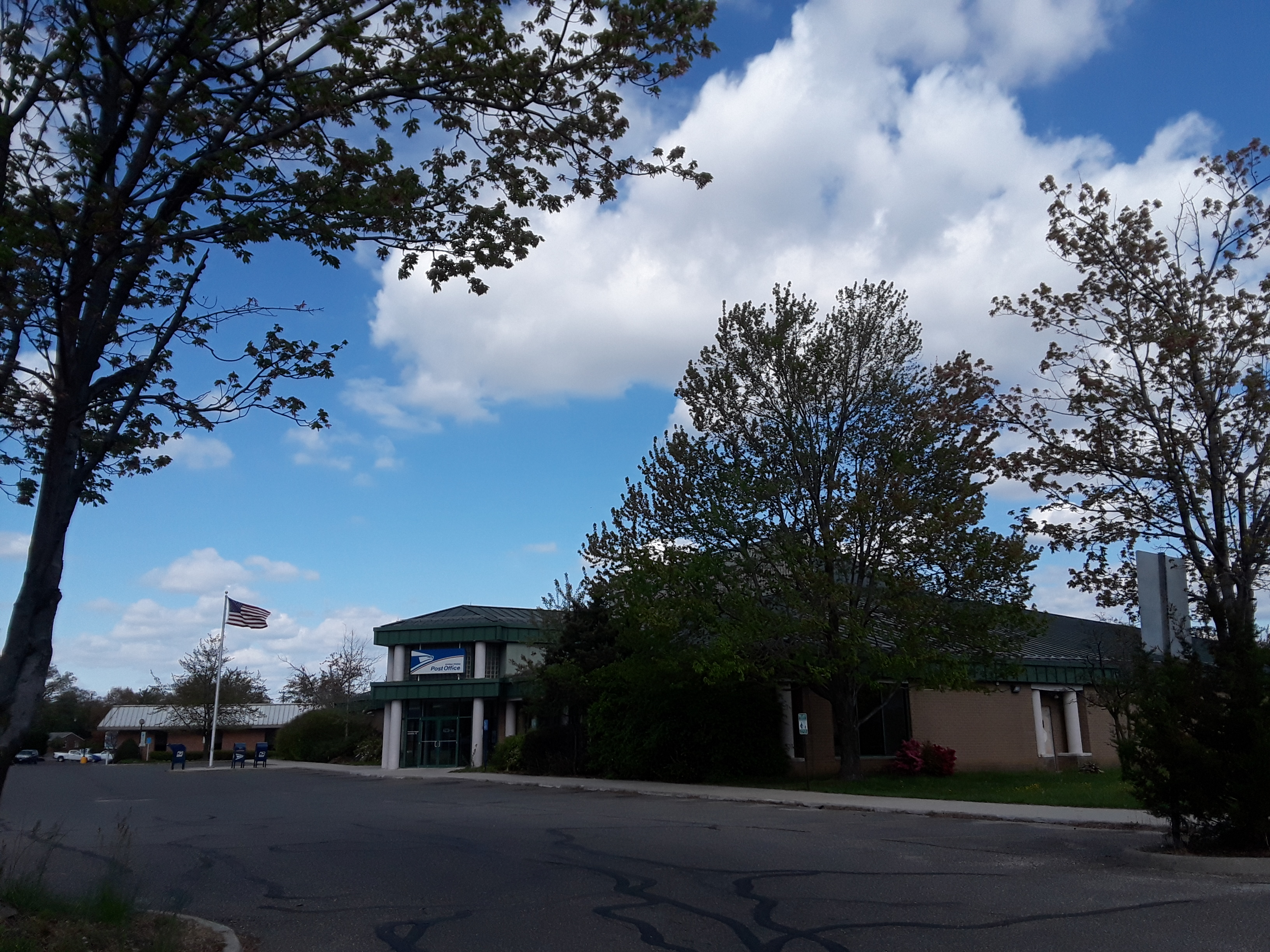
Rose Hill post office

On September 28, 1863, during the American Civil War, the house was the site of a raid by John S. Mosby and his raiders. They had ridden into Alexandria in an attempt to capture Francis Harrison Pierpont, whom they expected to find at the City Hotel. Discovering that he had left, the raiders burned a railroad bridge before heading along Telegraph Road to Rose Hill Plantation, where they sought Pierpont's aide, Col. Daniel F. Dulaney; the colonel's son, French, was among Mosby's company. Neighbor Anne S. Frobel later wrote in her diary that a "party of Mosby’s boys came very unexpectedly to Rose Hill, and took off Col. Dulaney. One of them was his own son. …This boy’s first greeting to his father when he rushed into the room where his father was in bed [was] ... ‘How do Pa—I’m very glad to see you,’ and the father’s answer sitting up in bed, with proper dignity, ‘Well, sir, I’m d-sorry to see you.’ But they took him down to Richmond nevertheless." The colonel survived the war, but his son was killed in 1864. In the years after the conflict, the area around Rose Hill was the site of farming and gravel mining operations. The frame house burned in 1895. The last owner of the property was Robert L. May.

What is today the community of Rose Hill was established in 1954; that same year the body of Daniel French Jr., which had been buried at the plantation at his death in 1771, was moved to Pohick Church. Within four years a Safeway had been constructed, as had two swimming pools serving residents. An elementary school was opened in 1957, a year after the foundation of the Rose Hill Civic Association. In 1970 the Fairfax County Park Authority purchased 148 acres in the area for construction of a golf course; the Greendale Golf Course was dedicated on August 19, 1976. Today it is one of eight courses managed by the Park Authority. Its property line marks the boundary of the community.

Today the history of Rose Hill is commemorated with a historic marker erected by the Fairfax County History Commission in 2000, located in front of the John Marshall Library. Another marker, erected as part of the Civil War Trails Program, tells the story of the 1863 raid. Also in the vicinity was the plantation Clermont, birthplace of Fitzhugh Lee. The site of the plantation is noted by a marker erected by the Virginia Department of Historic Resources in 2004; located in front of Mark Twain Middle School, it is south of the plantation's actual location. Landmarks in Rose Hill also included a pair of silos that were once part of a dairy farm in the vicinity, and which were later converted to serve as showers for the Rose Hill Swimming and Tennis Club. Attempts were made to list them on the Fairfax County Inventory of Historic Sites.

== Demographics ==
=== 2020 census ===
Rose Hill CDP, Virginia – Racial and ethnic composition Note: the US Census treats Hispanic/Latino as an ethnic category. This table excludes Latinos from the racial categories and assigns them to a separate category. Hispanics/Latinos may be of any race.
Race / Ethnicity (NH = Non-Hispanic)	Pop 2000	Pop 2010	Pop 2020	% 2000	% 2010	% 2020
White alone (NH)	10,301	11,238	10,509	68.41%	55.56%	49.94%
Black or African American alone (NH)	1,396	2,161	2,437	9.27%	10.68%	11.58%
Native American or Alaska Native alone (NH)	37	43	29	0.25%	0.21%	0.14%
Asian alone (NH)	1,273	1,977	2,266	8.45%	9.77%	10.77%
Native Hawaiian or Pacific Islander alone (NH)	7	18	11	0.05%	0.09%	0.05%
Other race alone (NH)	30	76	160	0.20%	0.38%	0.76%
Mixed race or Multiracial (NH)	410	493	1,103	2.72%	2.44%	5.24%
Hispanic or Latino (any race)	1,604	4,220	4,530	10.65%	20.86%	21.53%
Total	15,058	20,226	21,045	100.00%	100.00%	100.00%

=== 2000 census ===
As of the census of 2000, there were 15,058 people, 5,683 households, and 4,080 families residing in the CDP. The population density was 3,273.7 people per square mile (1,263.9/km^{2}). There were 5,783 housing units at an average density of 1,257.3/sq mi (485.4/km^{2}). The racial makeup of the CDP was 73.52% White, 9.52% African American, 0.27% Native American, 8.48% Asian, 0.05% Pacific Islander, 4.40% from other races, and 3.75% from two or more races. Hispanic or Latino of any race were 10.65% of the population.

There were 5,683 households, out of which 31.5% had children under the age of 18 living with them, 60.7% were married couples living together, 7.9% had a female householder with no husband present, and 28.2% were non-families. 21.0% of all households were made up of individuals, and 5.3% had someone living alone who was 65 years of age or older. The average household size was 2.65 and the average family size was 3.09.

In the CDP, the population was spread out, with 22.7% under the age of 18, 5.7% from 18 to 24, 34.0% from 25 to 44, 27.3% from 45 to 64, and 10.3% who were 65 years of age or older. The median age was 38 years. For every 100 females, there were 96.6 males. For every 100 females age 18 and over, there were 94.4 males.

The median income for a household in the CDP was $80,815, and the median income for a family was $89,414. Males had a median income of $53,917 versus $43,245 for females. The per capita income for the CDP was $34,213. About 1.6% of families and 3.6% of the population were below the poverty line, including 5.7% of those under age 18 and 3.1% of those age 65 or over.

Historical population
Census	Pop.	Note	%±
1970	14,692		—
1980	11,962		−18.6%
1990	12,675		6.0%
2000	15,058		18.8%
2010	20,226		34.3%
2020	21,045		4.0%

== Education ==
Fairfax County Public Schools operates public schools.

Fairfax County Public Library operates the John Marshall Library in the CDP.
