= Belle Haven, Fairfax County, Virginia =

- Census-designated place
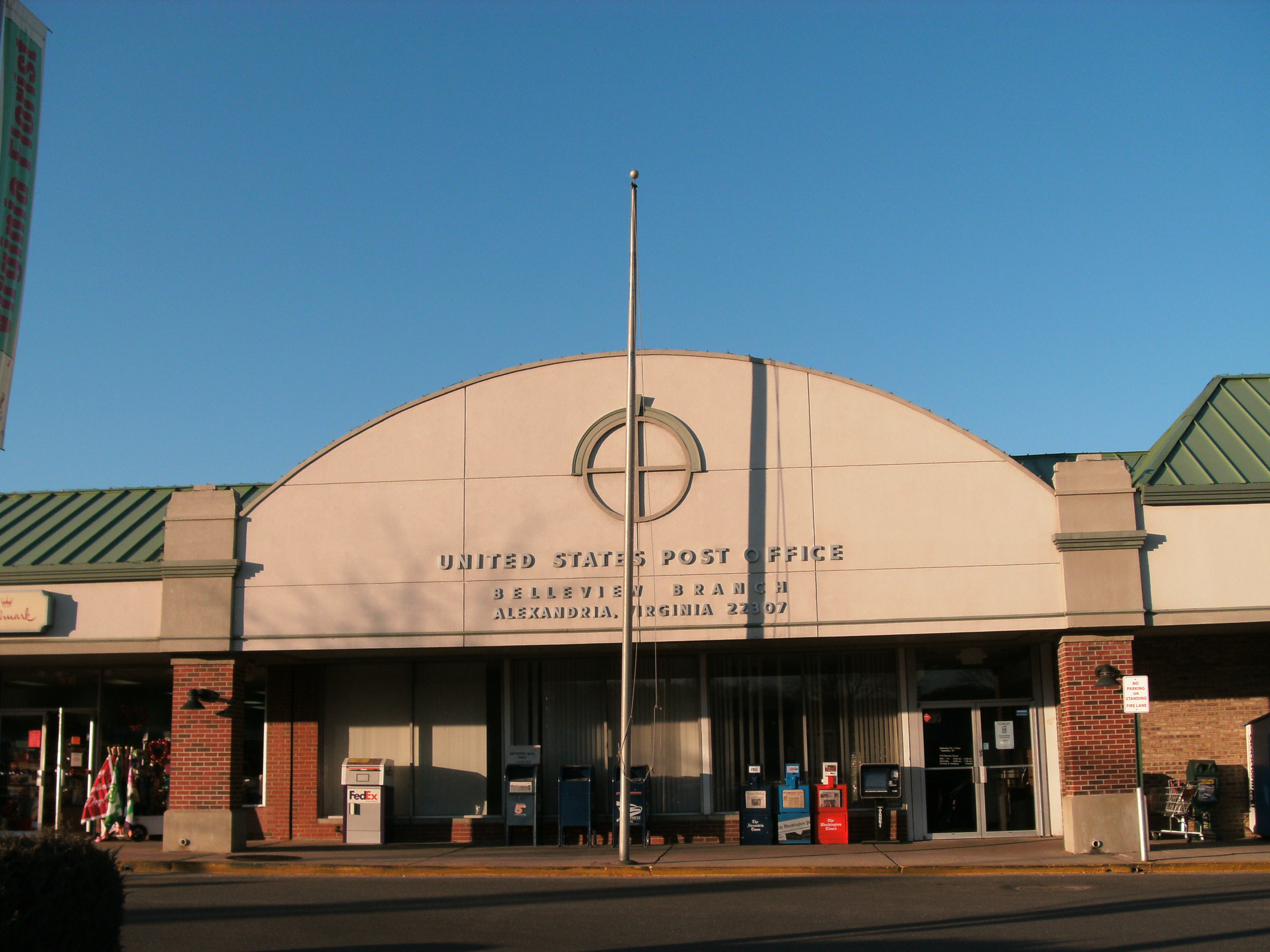
- Belleview Branch Post Office

- Location within Fairfax County

- Location within the state of Virginia Belle Haven (Virginia) Belle Haven (the United States)
- Coordinates: 38°46′44″N 77°3′39″W
- Country: United States
- State: Virginia
- County: Fairfax

Area
  - Total: 2.9 sq mi (7.4 km^{2})
  - Land: 2.0 sq mi (5.1 km^{2})
  - Water: 0.89 sq mi (2.3 km^{2})
- Elevation: 15 ft (4.6 m)

Population (2020)
  - Total: 6,851
  - Density: 3,479/sq mi (1,343.3/km^{2})
- Time zone: UTC−5 (Eastern (EST))
  - Summer (DST): UTC−4 (EDT)
- ZIP code: 22307 (Alexandria/Belleview)
- FIPS code: 51-05928
- GNIS feature ID: 2389195

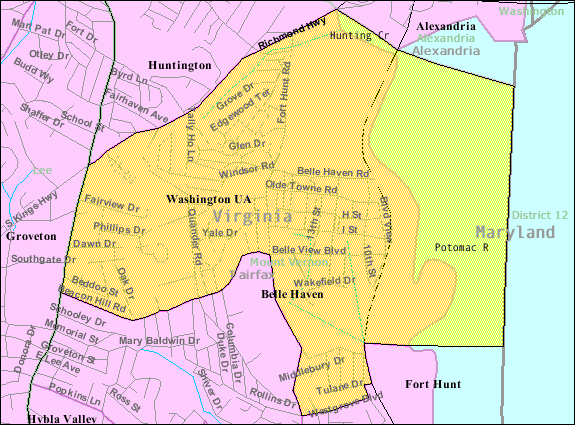
Map of the Belle Haven CDP

Belle Haven is a census-designated place (CDP) in Fairfax County, Virginia, United States. Nearby CDPs are Huntington (northwest), Groveton (southwest) and Fort Hunt (south). The population of Belle Haven was 6,851 at the 2020 census.

The CDP is located just south of Old Town Alexandria and bounded on the west by Richmond Highway (U.S. 1) and on the east by the Potomac River. It encompasses Belle Haven, a wealthy subdivision dating from the 1920s, and several adjoining neighborhoods. Some, particularly New Alexandria and Belle View, are among the lowest-lying residential areas of Fairfax County, and sustained extensive flood damage from storms including 2003's Hurricane Isabel and 1972's Hurricane Agnes. The Belleview branch of the Alexandria Post Office is located in Belle Haven, and serves the 22307 ZIP code in which the majority of the CDP falls.

== History ==
The name "Belle Haven" derives from when Scottish pioneers settled along the Potomac River in the early 18th century. They named the settlement after their favorite countryman, the Earl of Belhaven. This early settlement thrived along the Potomac River as a port and was later renamed "Alexandria". The area later became part of the West Grove Plantation, which was built by Hugh West around 1748. It capitalized on its close and favorable position to the newly forming town of Alexandria.

The West family was important in Virginia and Fairfax County politics in the 18th century. Hugh West himself was a burgess from Fairfax County, a vestryman, and a trustee of the town of Alexandria. His son, John, followed in his father's footsteps with continued public work until he died in 1777.

The home passed from the West family in 1814 to a Col. Augustine J. Smith, who bought the plantation from the last West, James, who died in 1814. Smith is known to have enlarged the original 155 acres (63 ha) to over 1,800 acres (730 ha). This included the draining of the swamps along the Potomac River and building a dike. This increased his land holding considerably, but the embankments were cut after his death and never repaired. He is also known for his vast building spree, where he had no less than thirteen new buildings built for the much enlarged plantation. These included larger slave quarters for the forty slaves he owned.

Smith died in 1830, and after several years the plantation was sold to Dennis Johnston. He did little enlarging to the plantation, still known as West's Grove. He was probably kept busy repairing all of Smith's additions. Johnston died several years before the Civil War, and his widow ran the plantation in his place. In 1862 the 39th New York Volunteer Infantry Regiment (Garibaldi Guard) occupied the plantation and later burned it to the ground, retaliating against the owner's sons for serving as officers on General Robert E. Lee's staff. No house occupied this land again until the first house was built in Belle Haven at 6041 Woodmont Road in 1928.

The current Belle Haven residential community had its start in the 1920s when David Howell, a civil engineer from Alexandria, purchased the land from owners Mrs. Thomas Wilfred Robinson Sr. and her brothers. Upon purchasing the land, Howell set up two corporations, one to construct a golf course and club, and the other to develop a residential subdivision. The golf course and club later became the Belle Haven Country Club, which still exists.

== Geography ==
Belle Haven is located in eastern Fairfax County at 38°46′44″N 77°3′39″W (38.779013, −77.060721). The eastern border of the community is in the Potomac River and is the state border with Maryland. The northern border follows tidal Hunting Creek and is with the city of Alexandria.

According to the United States Census Bureau, the CDP has a total area of 2.9 square miles (7.4 km^{2}), of which 2.0 square miles (5.1 km^{2}) is land and 0.89 square miles (2.3 km^{2}), or 30.93%, is water.

Belle Haven is located 20 minutes outside of Washington, D.C.

== Demographics ==
Historical population
Census	Pop.	Note	%±
2000	6,269		—
2010	6,518		4.0%
2020	6,851		5.1%
U.S. Decennial Census; 1950 1960 1970; 1980 1990 2000; 2010

=== 2020 Census ===
Belle Haven CDP, Virginia – Racial and ethnic composition Note: the US Census treats Hispanic/Latino as an ethnic category. This table excludes Latinos from the racial categories and assigns them to a separate category. Hispanics/Latinos may be of any race.
Race / Ethnicity (NH = Non-Hispanic)	Pop 2000	Pop 2010	Pop 2020	% 2000	% 2010	% 2020
White alone (NH)	5,207	4,935	4,681	83.06%	75.71%	68.33%
Black or African American alone (NH)	427	447	452	6.81%	6.86%	6.60%
Native American or Alaska Native alone (NH)	11	12	10	0.18%	0.18%	0.15%
Asian alone (NH)	142	226	277	2.27%	3.47%	4.04%
Native Hawaiian or Pacific Islander alone (NH)	4	10	3	0.06%	0.15%	0.04%
Other race alone (NH)	20	3	34	0.32%	0.05%	0.50%
Mixed race or Multiracial (NH)	115	118	272	1.83%	1.81%	3.97%
Hispanic or Latino (any race)	343	767	1,122	5.47%	11.77%	16.38%
Total	6,269	6,518	6,851	100.00%	100.00%	100.00%

At the 2020 census (some information from the 2022 American Community Survey) there were 6,851 people, 3,263 housing units and 2,747 households residing in the CDP. The population density was 3,425.5 inhabitants per square mile (1,343.3/km^{2}). The average housing unit density was 1,631.5 per square mile (639.8/km^{2}). The racial makeup of the CDP was 70.97% White, 6.73% African American, 0.66% Native American, 4.10% Asian, 0.04% Pacific Islander, 7.87% from other races, and 9.63% from two or more races. Hispanic or Latino of any race was 16.38% of the population.

Of the family households, 48.1% were married couples, 22.2% were a male family householder with no spouse, and 26.8% were a female family householder with no spouse. The average family household had 3.15 people.

The median age was 41.5, 24.4% of people were under the age of 18, and 16.1% were 65 years of age or older. The largest ancestry is the 28.1% who had Irish ancestry, 18.0% spoke a language other than English at home, and 13.1% were born outside the United States, 45.7% of whom were naturalized citizens.

The median income for a household in the CDP was $129,495, and the median income for a family was $190,469. 9.2% of the population were military veterans, and 71.2% had a batchelor's degree or higher. In the CDP 3.0% of the population was below the poverty line, including 3.2% of those under age 18 and 0.6% of those age 65 or over, with 2.3% of the population without health insurance.

=== 2010 Census ===
The population of Belle Haven was 6,518 at the 2010 census.

=== 2000 Census ===
As of the census of 2000, there were 6,269 people, 3,116 households, and 1,570 families residing in the CDP. The population density was 3,182.3 inhabitants per square mile (1,228.7/km^{2}). There were 3,220 housing units at an average density of 1,634.6 per square mile (631.1/km^{2}). The racial makeup of the CDP was 86.17% White, 6.88% African American, 0.26% Native American, 2.27% Asian, 0.06% Pacific Islander, 1.93% from other races, and 2.44% from two or more races. Hispanic or Latino of any race were 5.47% of the population.

There were 3,116 households, out of which 19.5% had children under the age of 18 living with them, 40.7% were married couples living together, 7.5% had a female householder with no husband present, and 49.6% were non-families. 41.8% of all households were made up of individuals, and 9.6% had someone living alone who was 65 years of age or older. The average household size was 2.01, and the average family size was 2.77.

In the CDP, the population was spread out, with 17.2% under the age of 18, 4.1% from 18 to 24, 35.0% from 25 to 44, 28.8% from 45 to 64, and 14.9% who were 65 years of age or older. The median age was 41 years. For every 100 females, there were 87.3 males. For every 100 females age 18 and over, there were 83.5 males.

The median income for a household in the CDP was $65,262, and the median income for a family was $92,195. Males had a median income of $55,446 versus $42,485 for females. The per capita income for the CDP was $46,483. About 3.3% of families and 5.0% of the population were below the poverty line, including 4.7% of those under age 18 and 3.4% of those age 65 or over.

=== Population history of Belle Haven CDP from the U.S. Census Bureau ===
- 1980...6,520
- 1990...6,427
- 2000...6,269
- 2010...6,518
- 2020...6,851

== Gallery ==
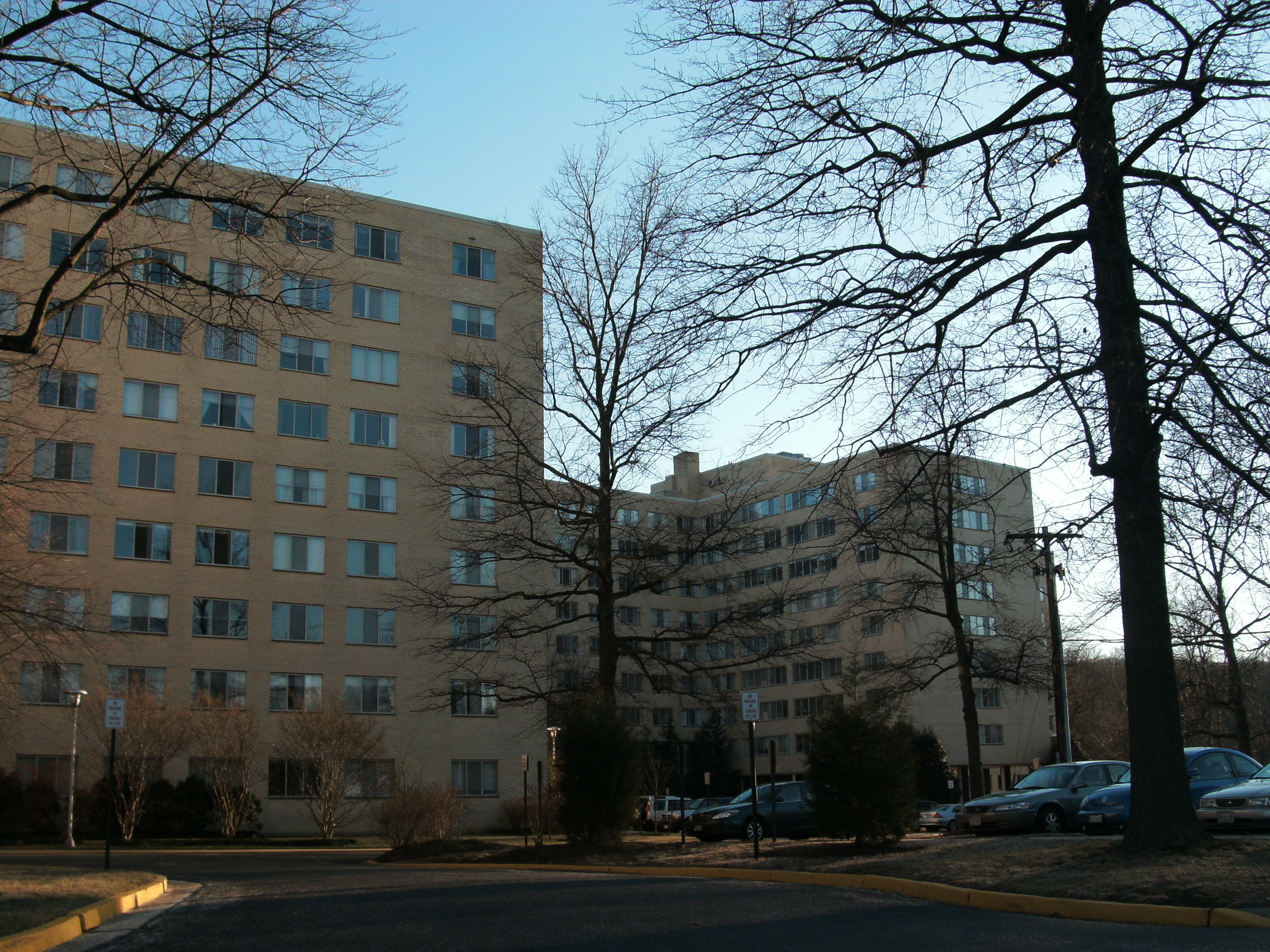
River Towers condominium complex

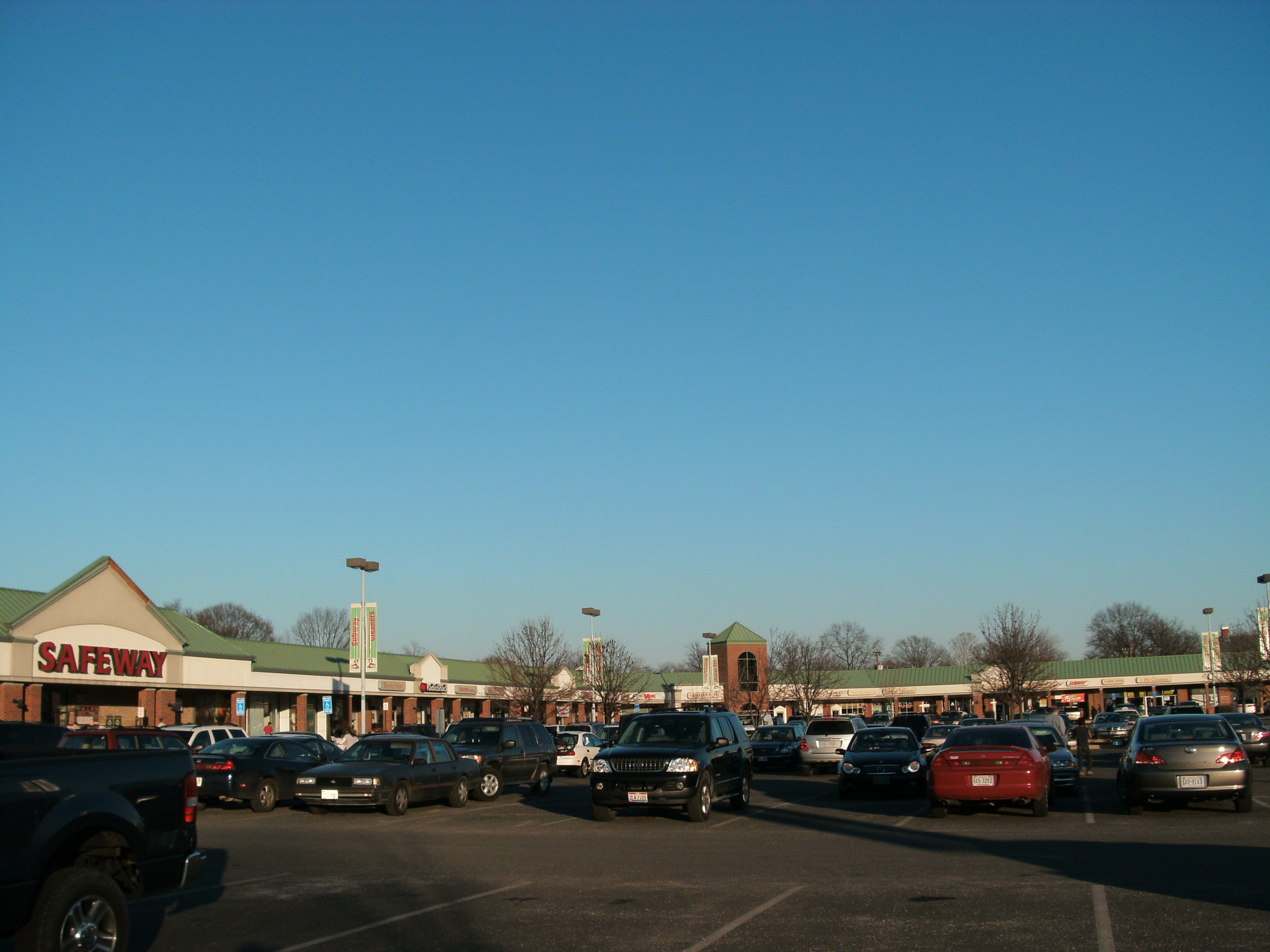
Belle View Shopping Center

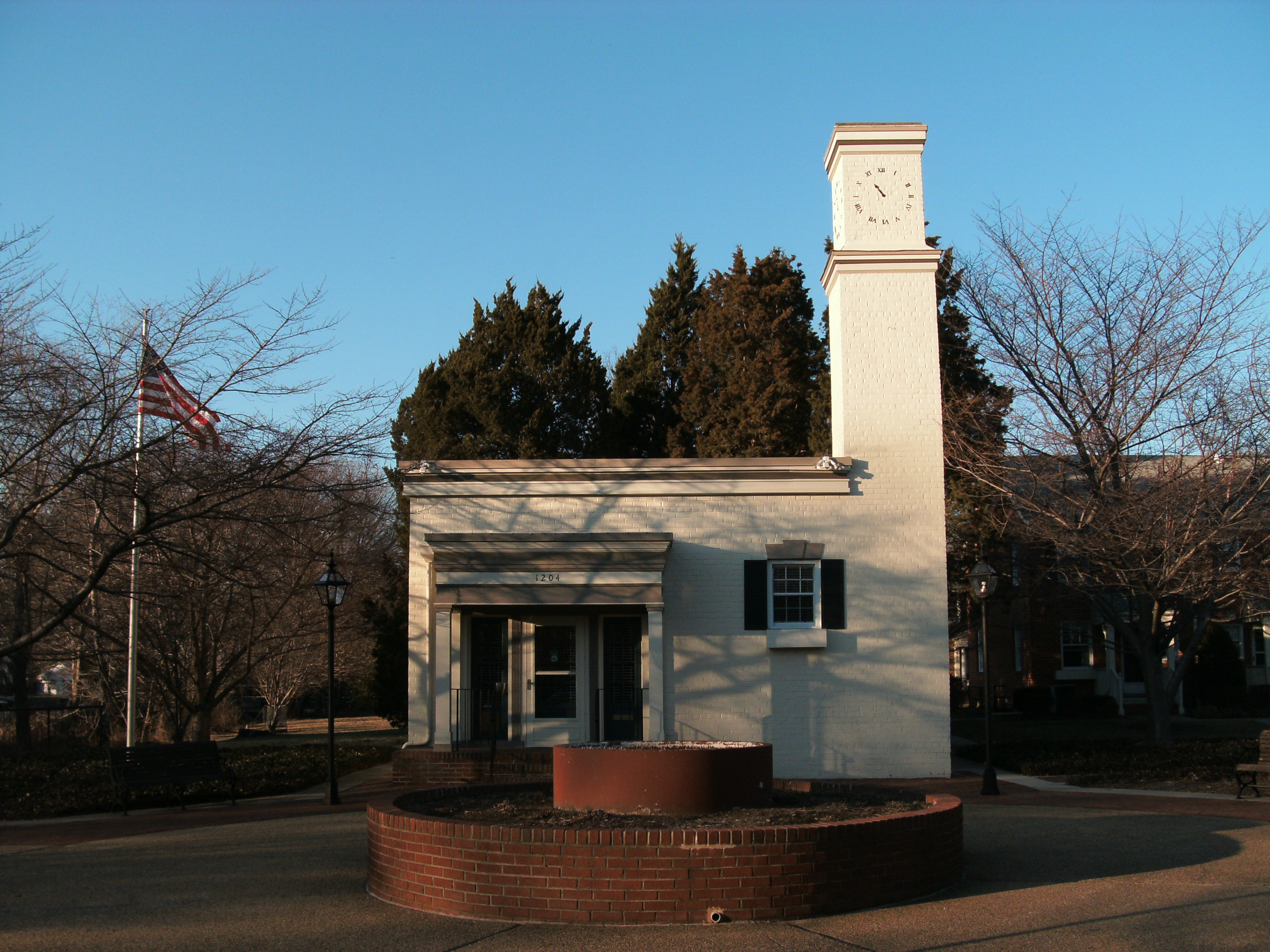
Belle View Condominium Association Management Office

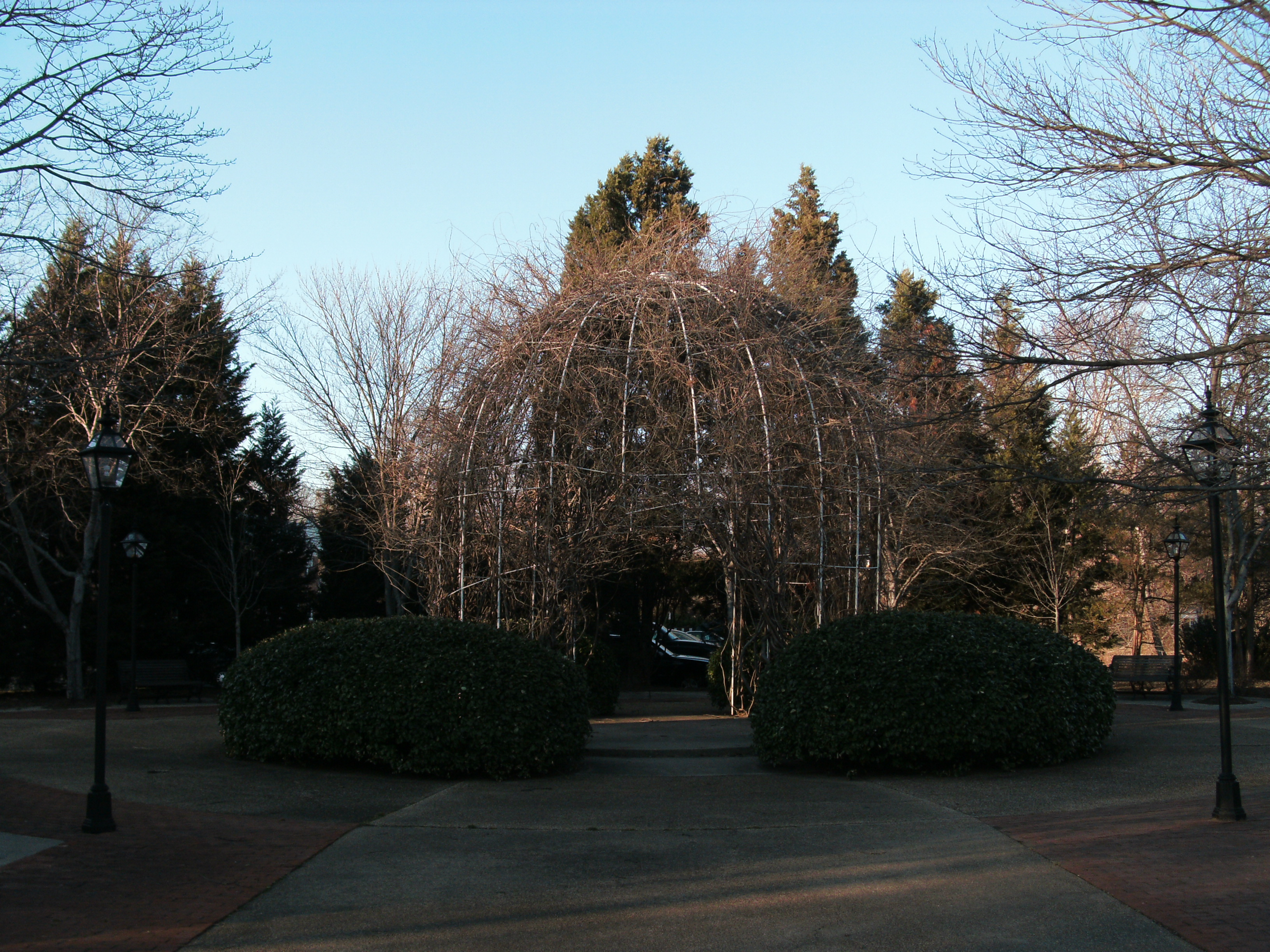
Bower which forms the centerpiece of the Belle View Town Square

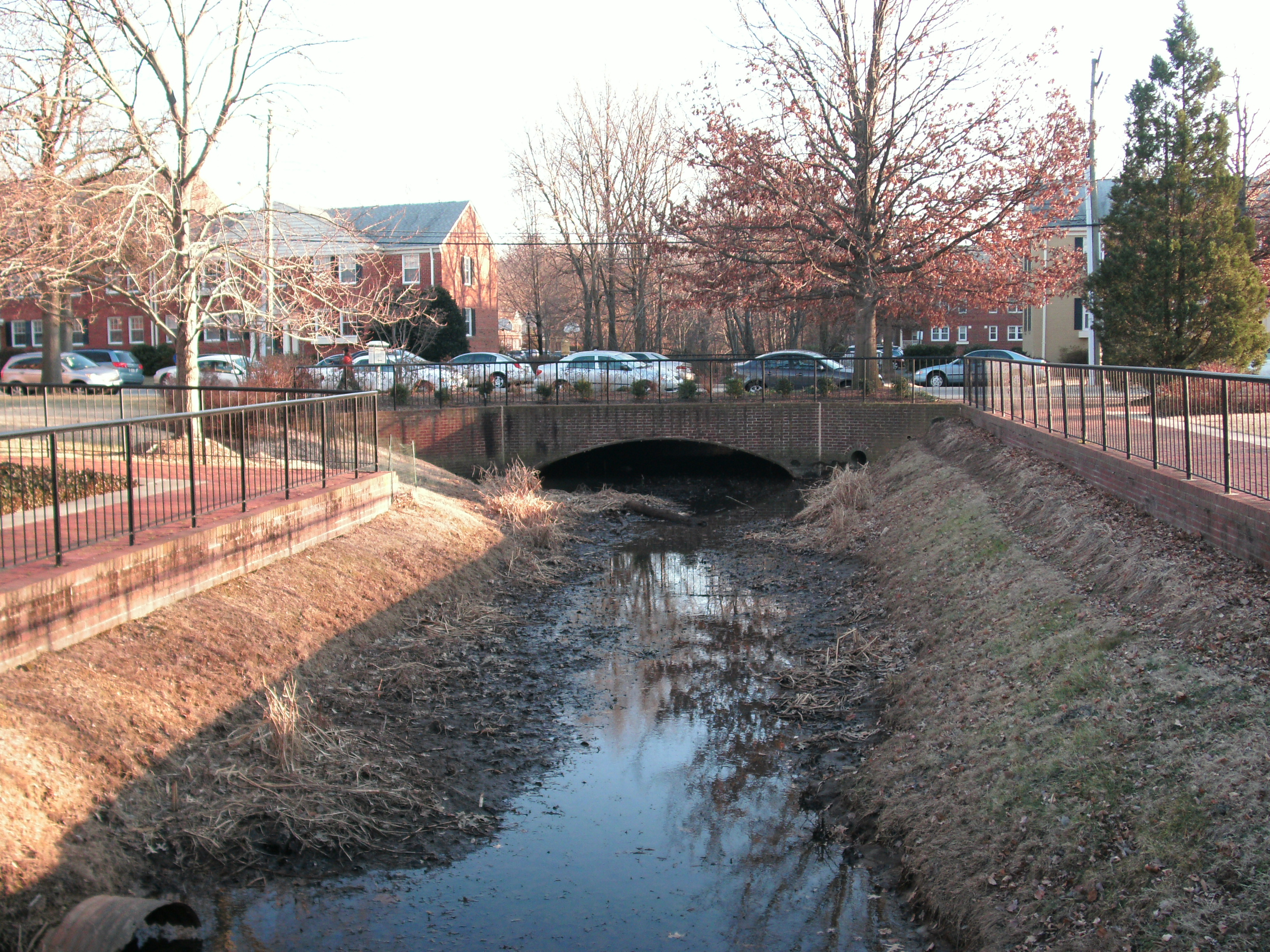
Creek which runs through Belle View

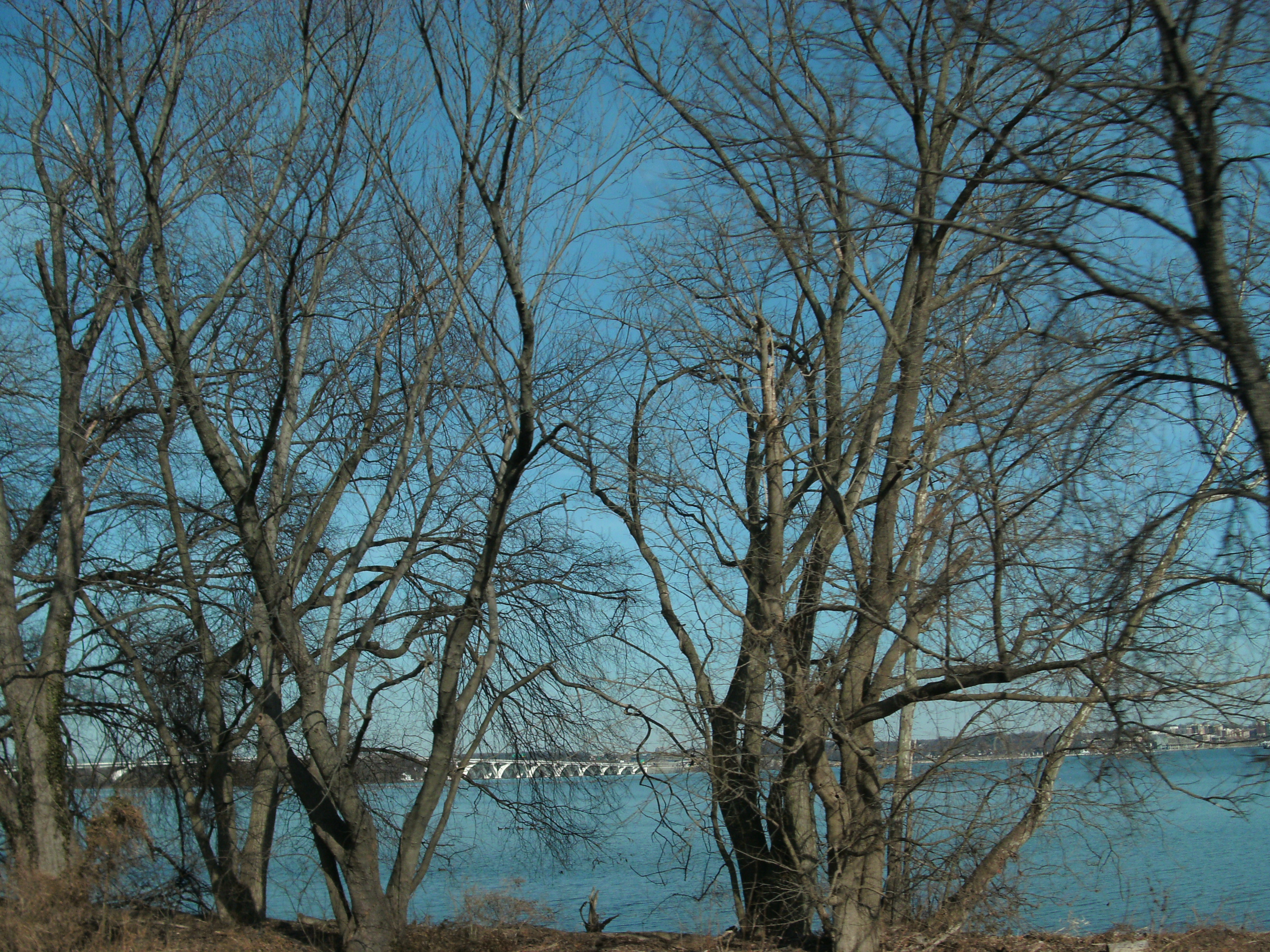
Along the George Washington Memorial Parkway in Belle View

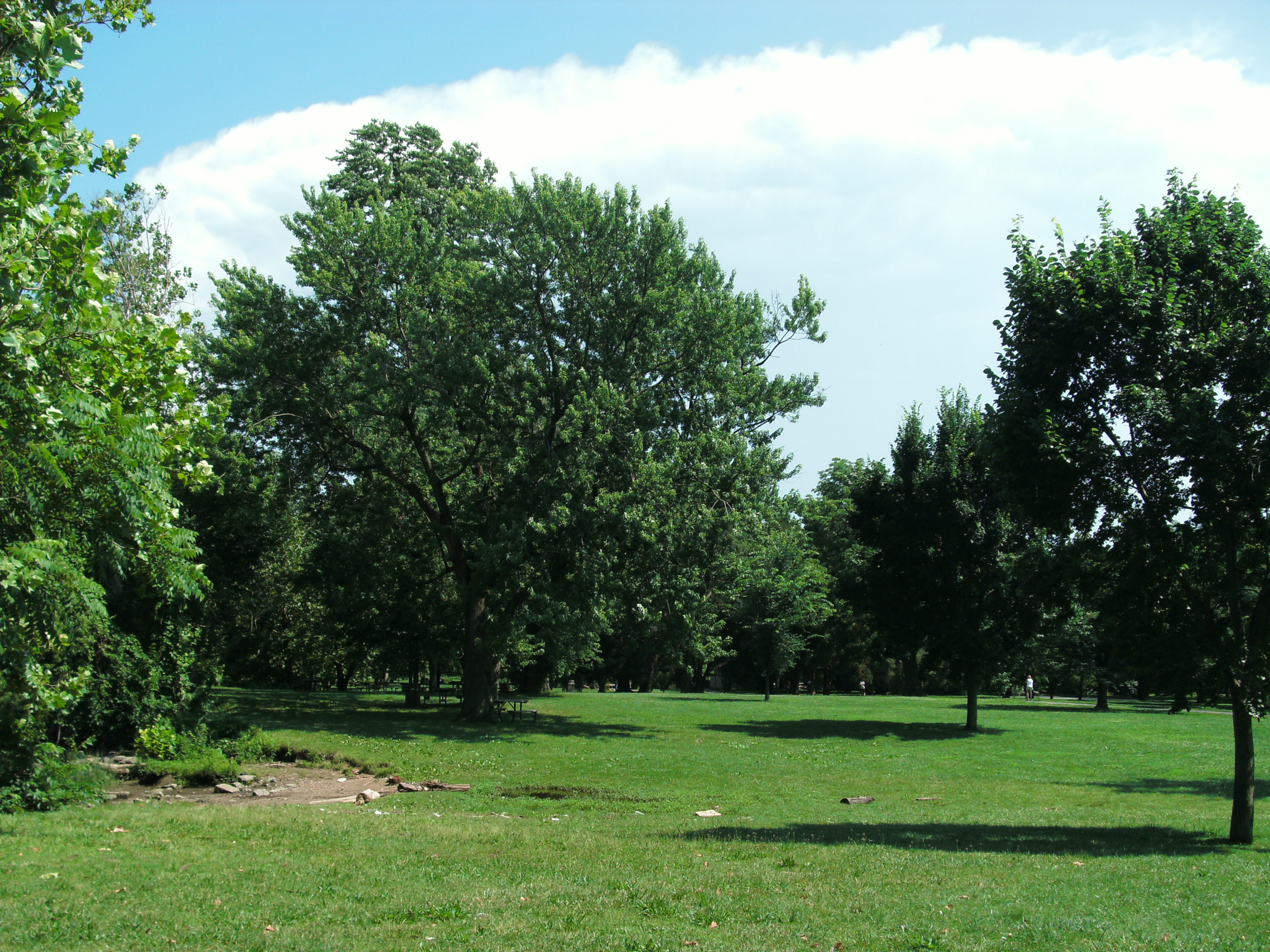
Belle Haven Park, along the river

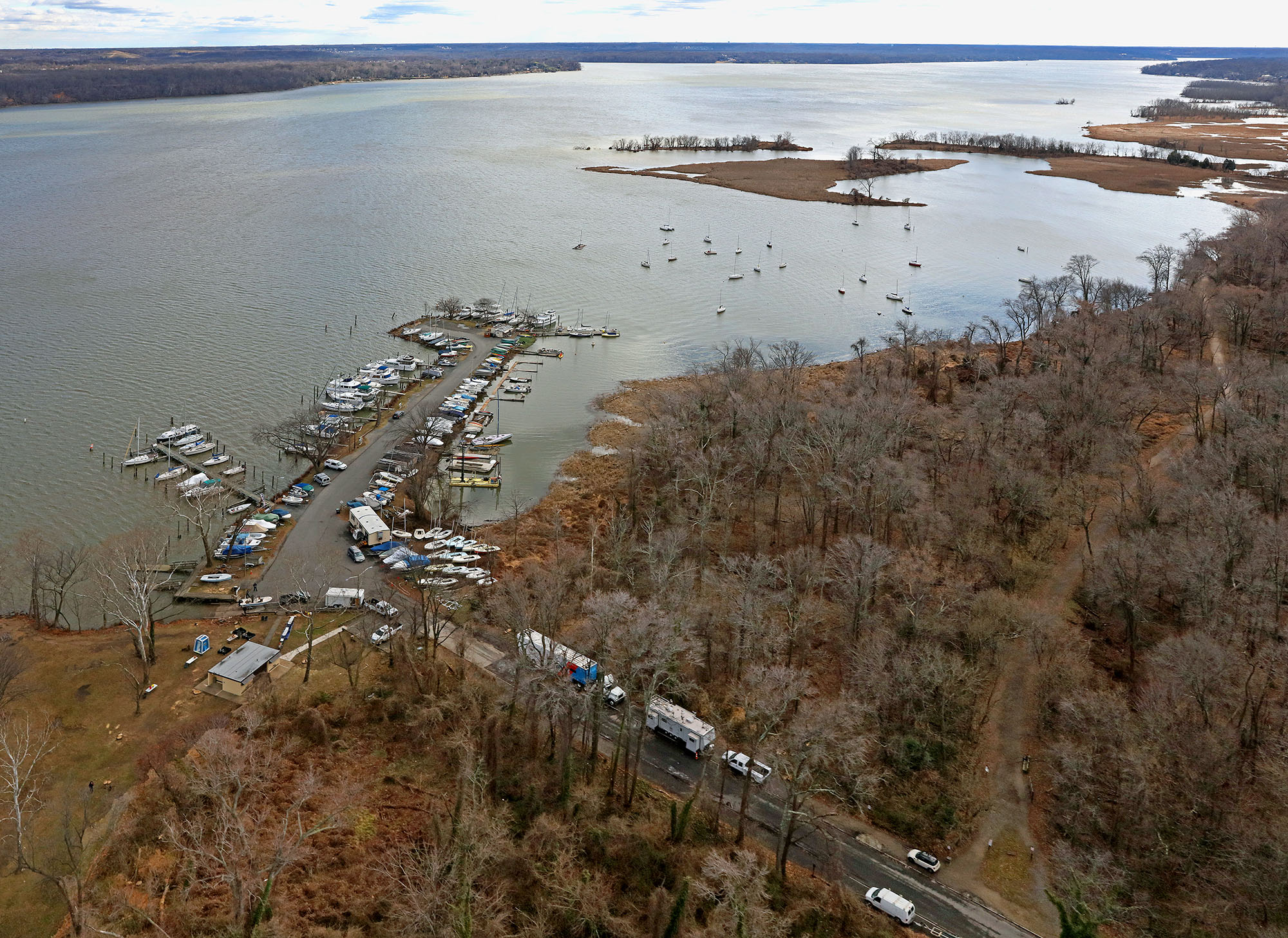
Aerial view of Bell Haven Marina

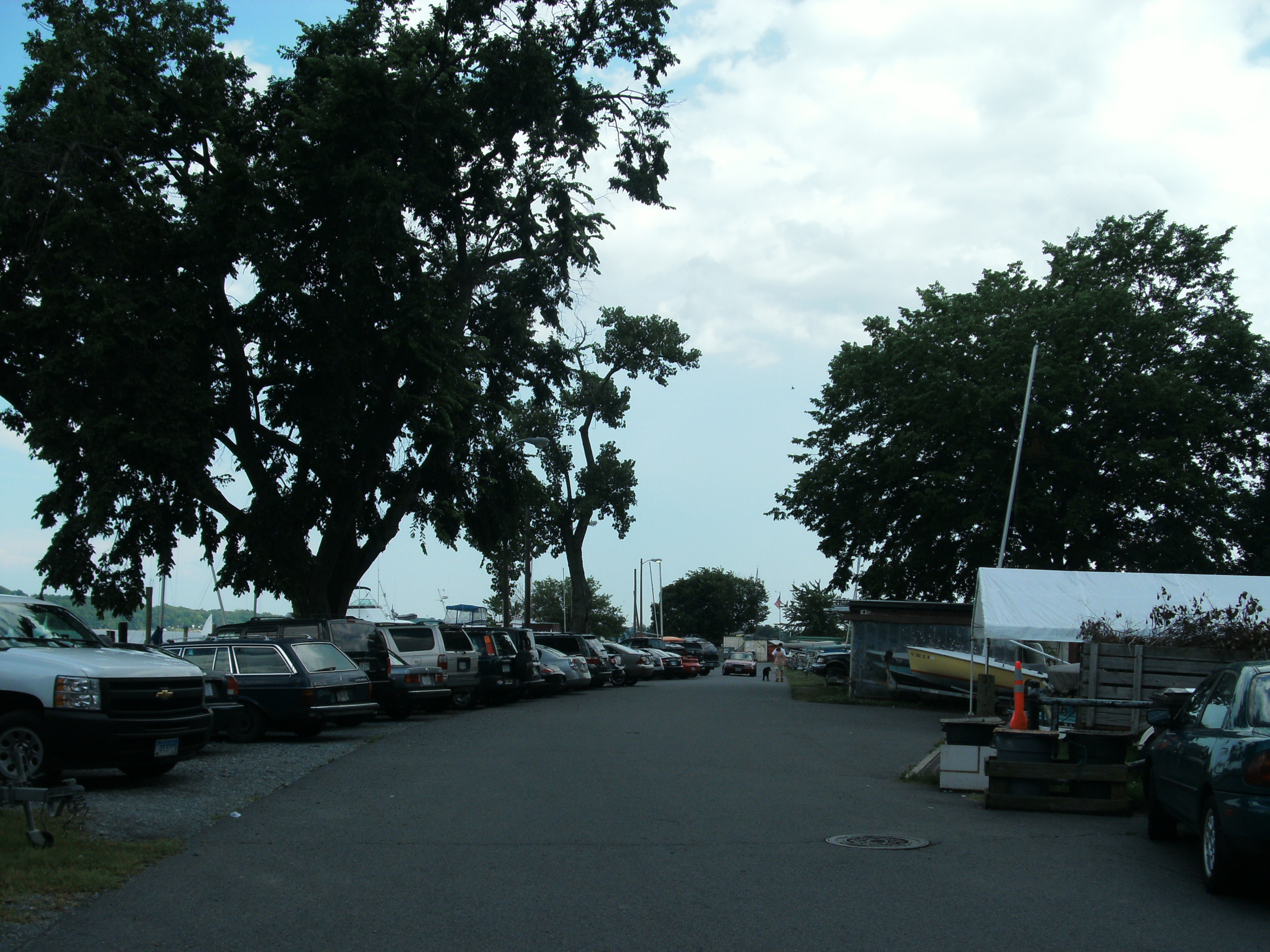
The Belle Haven Marina

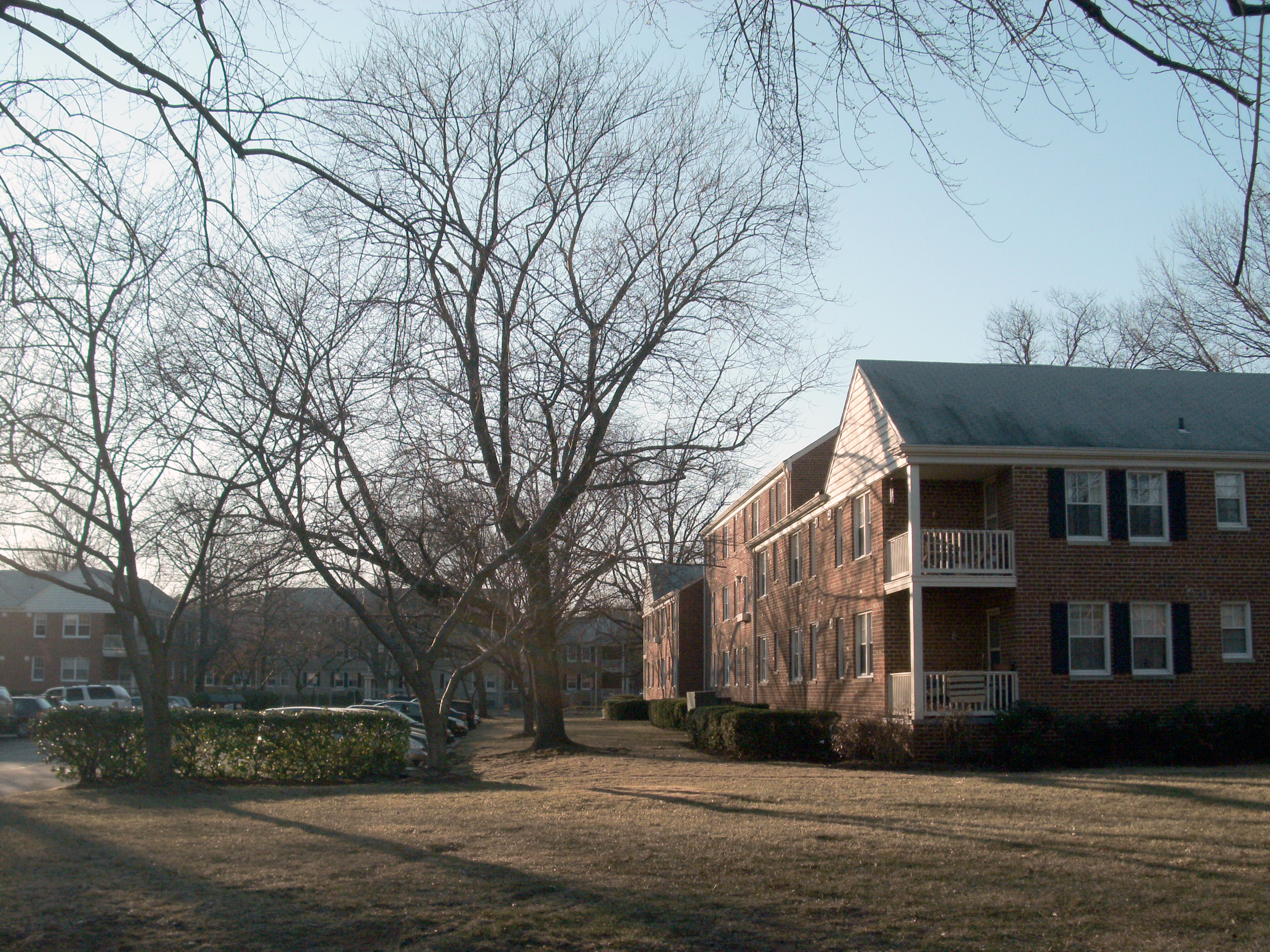
Belle View Condominiums
