= Kingstowne, Virginia =

- Census-designated place
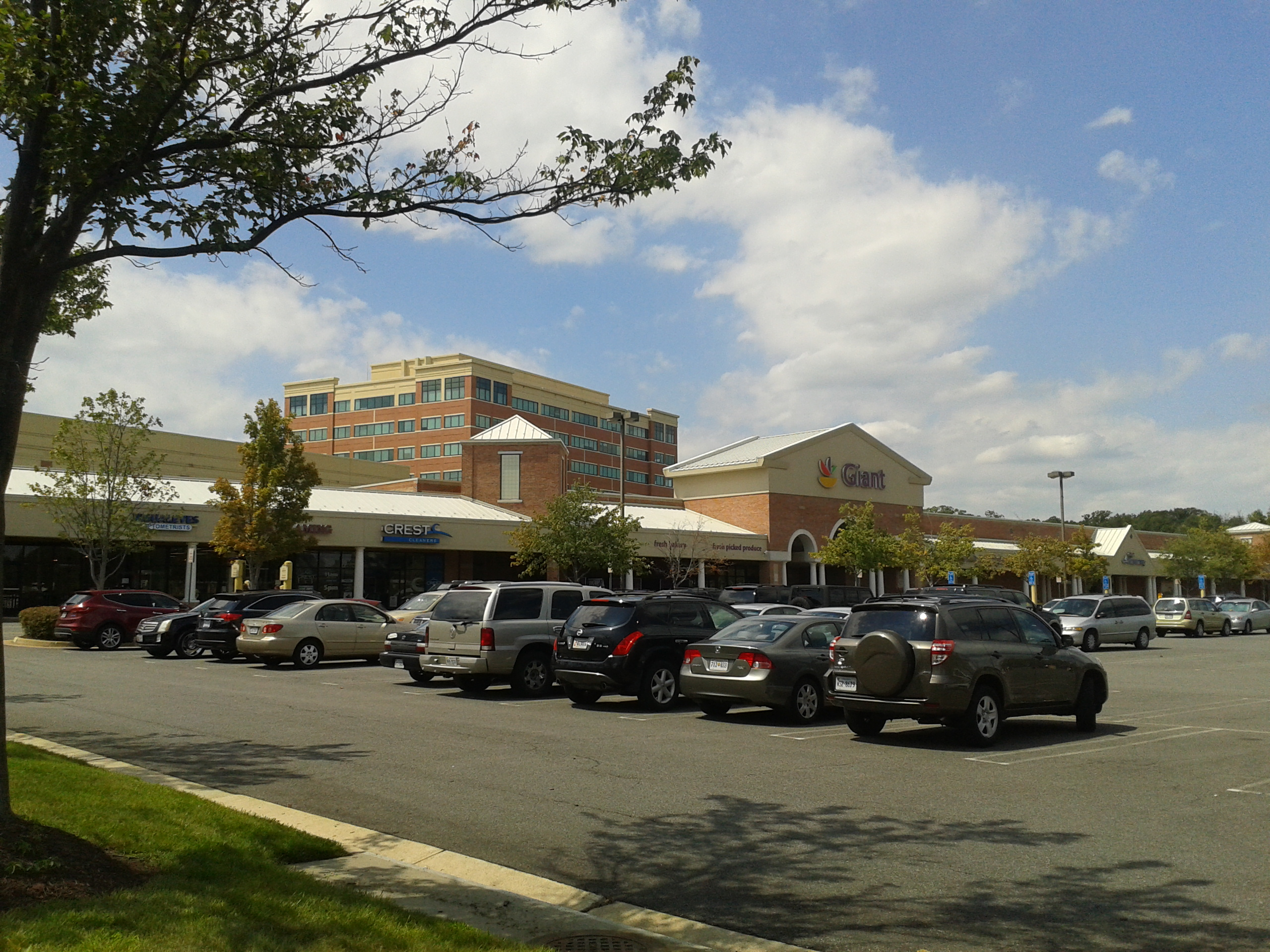
- Shops and office building in Kingstowne, August 2015

- Location within Northern Virginia Location within Virginia Location within the United States
- Coordinates: 38°46′37″N 77°8′11″W
- Country: United States
- State: Virginia
- County: Fairfax

Area
  - Total: 2.9 sq mi (7.5 km^{2})
  - Land: 2.9 sq mi (7.4 km^{2})
  - Water: 0.039 sq mi (0.1 km^{2})
- Elevation: 200 ft (61 m)

Population (2020)
  - Total: 16,825
  - Density: 5,889/sq mi (2,273.6/km^{2})
- Time zone: UTC−5 (Eastern (EST))
  - Summer (DST): UTC−4 (EDT)
- ZIP code: 22315
- FIPS code: 51-42746
- GNIS feature ID: 2584862

Kingstowne is a census-designated place (CDP) in Fairfax County, Virginia, United States. It is a planned community amid the Washington, D.C. suburbs of Springfield, Alexandria, and Franconia, Virginia, and is centered on the intersection of South Van Dorn Street and Kingstowne Boulevard. The population as of the 2020 census was 16,825.

Kingstowne has a town center containing office and retail businesses. The entire community comprises numerous subdivisions containing apartments, condominiums, single-family homes, and townhomes. It began construction in the 1980s through the Halle Companies and is still expanding today in the town center with commercial and office space and in the subdivisions with more single-family homes. Kingstowne has its own ZIP code, 22315, a substation of the Alexandria U.S. Post Office.

== Geography ==
The Kingstowne CDP is in southeastern Fairfax County, bordered to the north and west by Franconia, to the northeast by Rose Hill, to the southeast by Hayfield, to the south by Fort Belvoir, and for a short distance at its southwestern end by Newington. Downtown Washington, D.C., is 13 miles (21 km) to the northeast.

According to the U.S. Census Bureau, the Kingstowne CDP has a total area of 2.9 square miles (7.5 km^{2}), of which 2.9 square miles (7.4 km^{2}) is land and 0.04 square miles (0.1 km^{2}), or 1.49%, is water.

== Demographics ==
Historical population
Census	Pop.	Note	%±
2010	15,556		—
2020	16,825		8.2%
U.S. Decennial Census; 2010 2020

Kingstowne was first listed as a census designated place in the 2010 U.S. census formed from part of Franconia CDP and Rose Hill CDP.

=== Racial and ethnic composition ===
Kingstowne CDP, Virginia – Racial and ethnic composition Note: the US Census treats Hispanic/Latino as an ethnic category. This table excludes Latinos from the racial categories and assigns them to a separate category. Hispanics/Latinos may be of any race.
Race / Ethnicity (NH = Non-Hispanic)	Pop 2010	Pop 2020	% 2010	% 2020
White alone (NH)	8,887	8,172	57.13%	48.57%
Black or African American alone (NH)	2,563	3,328	16.48%	19.78%
Native American or Alaska Native alone (NH)	40	12	0.26%	0.07%
Asian alone (NH)	2,007	1,994	12.90%	11.85%
Native Hawaiian or Pacific Islander alone (NH)	7	24	0.04%	0.14%
Other race alone (NH)	65	105	0.42%	0.62%
Mixed race or Multiracial (NH)	592	1,120	3.81%	6.66%
Hispanic or Latino (any race)	1,395	2,070	8.97%	12.30%
Total	15,556	16,825	100.00%	100.00%

=== 2020 census ===
As of the 2020 census, Kingstowne had a population of 16,825. The median age was 39.3 years. 21.9% of residents were under the age of 18 and 12.1% of residents were 65 years of age or older. For every 100 females there were 87.9 males, and for every 100 females age 18 and over there were 84.2 males age 18 and over.

100.0% of residents lived in urban areas, while 0.0% lived in rural areas.

There were 6,951 households in Kingstowne, of which 31.9% had children under the age of 18 living in them. Of all households, 49.3% were married-couple households, 15.7% were households with a male householder and no spouse or partner present, and 30.4% were households with a female householder and no spouse or partner present. About 29.1% of all households were made up of individuals and 8.7% had someone living alone who was 65 years of age or older.

There were 7,181 housing units, of which 3.2% were vacant. The homeowner vacancy rate was 1.0% and the rental vacancy rate was 3.5%.
