= Franconia, Virginia =

Franconia
- Census-designated place
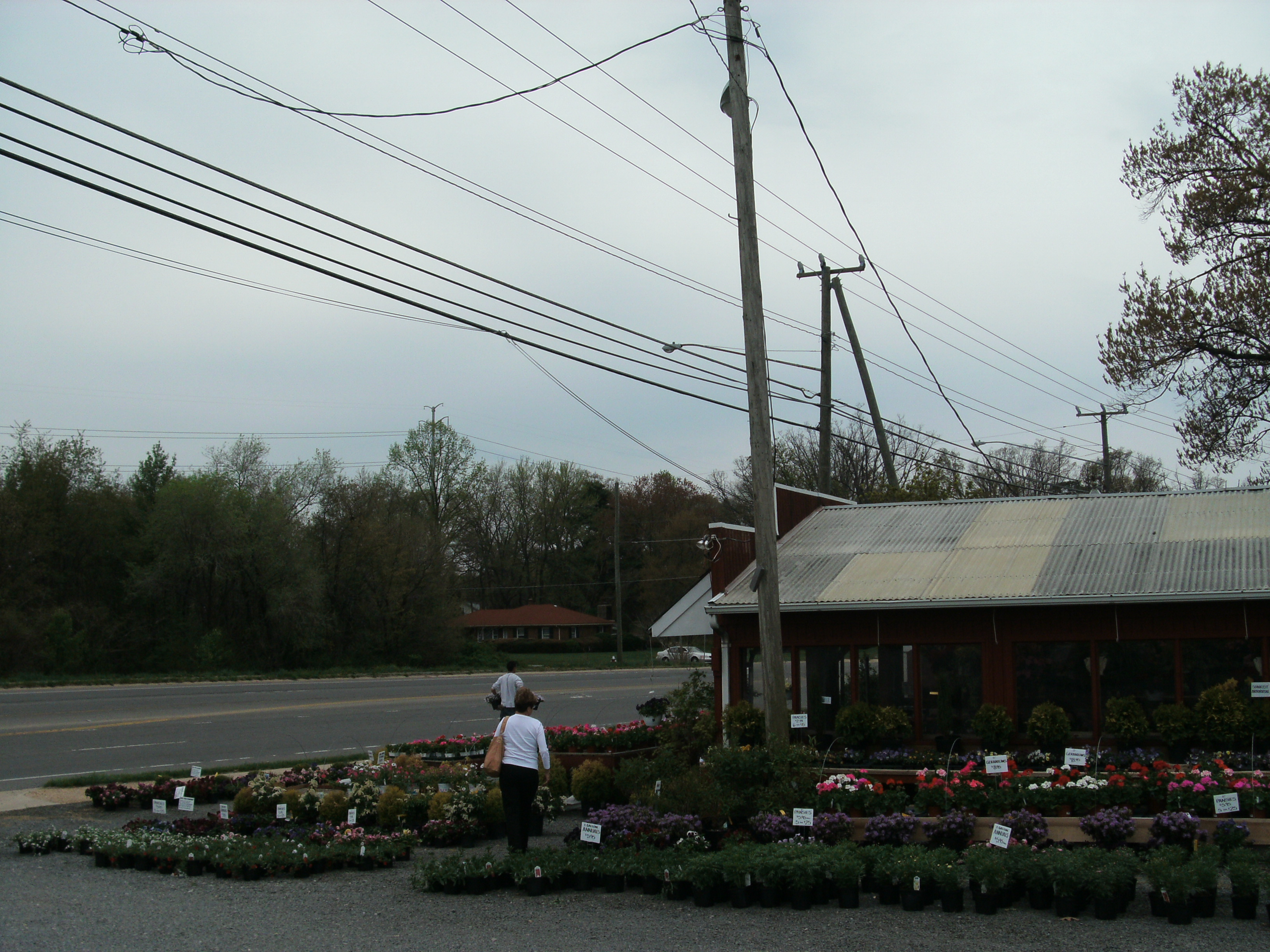
- Nall's Produce in Franconia

- Location of Franconia in Fairfax County, Virginia

- Location within Northern Virginia
- Coordinates: 38°45′48″N 77°9′1″W
- Country: United States
- State: Virginia
- County: Fairfax

Area
  - Total: 3.48 sq mi (9.01 km^{2})
  - Land: 3.47 sq mi (8.99 km^{2})
  - Water: 0.0077 sq mi (0.02 km^{2})
- Elevation: 249 ft (76 m)

Population (2020)
  - Total: 18,943
  - Density: 5,457/sq mi (2,107.1/km^{2})
- Time zone: UTC−5 (Eastern (EST))
  - Summer (DST): UTC−4 (EDT)
- ZIP Codes: 22310, 22315
- Area codes: 703, 571
- FIPS code: 51-29552
- GNIS feature ID: 1492975

Franconia is a census-designated place (CDP) in Fairfax County, Virginia, United States. The population was 18,943 at the 2020 census.

Located just southwest of Alexandria, Franconia has existed as a community since the 1870s, when a station by that name opened on the RF&P Railroad. Like most of the surrounding area, however, it began to develop into its present suburban form only in the 1950s. The CDP extends south to just north of the border of Fort Belvoir, encompassing neighborhoods such as Manchester Lakes and Windsor Estates. Street addresses have Alexandria ZIP Codes 22310 and 22315. It is near the Springfield Mall shopping area and the Franconia–Springfield Washington Metro station.

== Geography ==
Franconia is located in southeastern Fairfax County at 38°45′48″N 77°09′01″W (38.763351, −77.150328). It is bordered to the west by Springfield, to the north by Lincolnia, to the northeast by Rose Hill, to the east by Kingstowne, and to the south by Newington. It is 13 miles (21 km) southwest of Washington, D.C.

According to the United States Census Bureau, the Franconia CDP has a total area of 3.5 square miles (9.0 km^{2}), of which 0.01 square miles (0.02 km^{2}), or 0.18%, is water.

== History ==
Franconia Road once served as a rolling road to bring tobacco hogsheads to the port at Alexandria. The surrounding community derives its name from the "Frankhonia Farm", which sat on a portion of a tract of 191 acres purchased from Joseph Broders of Oak Grove Farm in 1859 by William Fowle, a merchant from Alexandria. Fowle's son, Robert Rollins Fowle, sold 18 acres of the property to the Alexandria & Fredericksburg Railway Company in 1871 for the erection of a railway station, which took its name of the farm. The station was the site of the Garfield Post Office from 1881 until 1890, and again from 1898 until 1907. In 1903, it was relocated after a fire from its original site, near Fleet Drive, to the north side of Franconia Road. The railway station remained in regular service until around 1953. Today, it is memorialized with a historic marker erected by the Fairfax County History Commission in 2000, located in front of the Franconia Governmental Center. For many years the center of the community was Wards Corner, at the intersection of Franconia Road and Old Rolling Road. Over twenty-five years the complex grew to include a gas station, grocery store, bar, movie theater, and dance hall; a 1959 fire destroyed everything at the site.

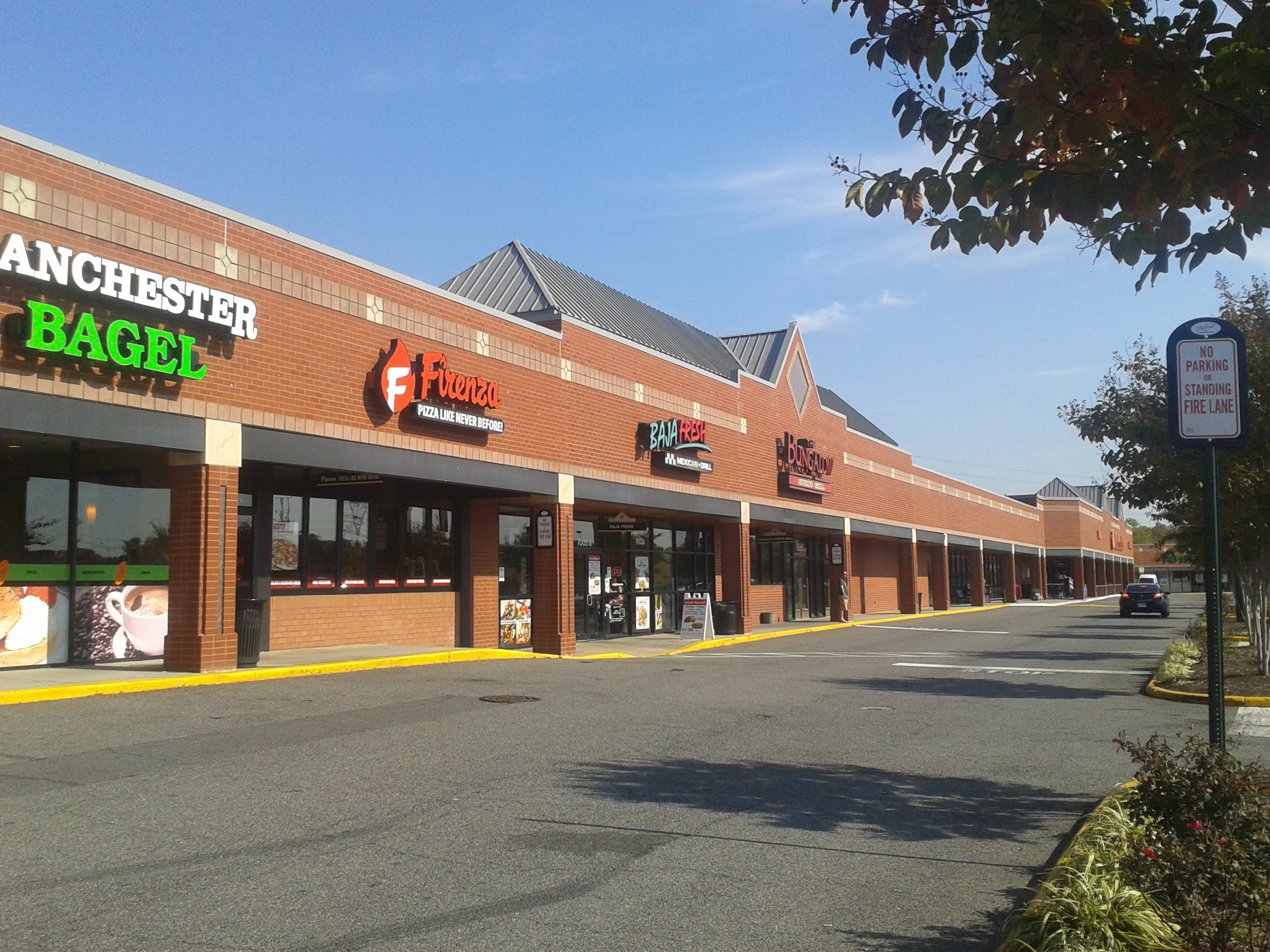
Shops at the Festival at Manchester Lakes shopping plaza

The Franconia area was the site of a skirmish in January 1862, during the American Civil War. Colonel Wade Hampton III, having led a group of cavalrymen across the Occoquan River past Pohick Church, encountered a group of Union cavalry in the area and gave chase. Being warned by a Texas scout that he was soon to enter an ambush, Hampton stopped short and formed a squadron on top of Potter's Hill. The trap having failed, both sides began firing at each other; several soldiers were wounded, including one of Hampton's men who was shot in the face. The Confederates then retreated across the Occoquan. In later years Potter's Hill was the site of three schoolhouses, the last of them burning in 1932; more recently it was the site of a chicken farm and, later, a gravel quarry which provided material for the construction of the first Woodrow Wilson Bridge. Today the location is the site of the Hilltop Village Center. Members of the Potter family are buried at the Millan family cemetery, located nearby on the former grounds of the Millan family home, Dairy Lodge.

The Franconia Volunteer Fire Department was organized in 1934; its first firehouse, completed in 1937, stood where the government center is located today. Today the department continues to serve the community from two locations in the vicinity.

Franconia is also the site of the Laurel Grove Colored School and Church, organized as a congregation of former slaves in the 1880s. The church cemetery still exists, as does the school building, which was honored in 2008 with the erection of a historical marker by the Fairfax County History Commission. A number of other churches have existed in the neighborhood over the years, including Sharon Chapel, founded in 1848 and counting Phillips Brooks among its early seminarians, and Olivet Episcopal Church. Adjacent to Sharon Chapel is a cemetery, one of several in the area; another marks the former site of Oak Grove plantation, which was demolished in 1996 to make way for an assisted living facility. Other cemeteries can be found along Beulah Street.

The Franconia area is represented in the Virginia House of Delegates by Democrat Mark D. Sickles. Other residents have included former South Carolina Congressman William Waters Boyce, who purchased the house Ashland and 195 acres of farmland after the Civil War.

The history of the Franconia community and the surrounding area is preserved and interpreted by the Franconia Museum, located in the Franconia Governmental Center.

== Demographics ==
=== Racial and ethnic composition ===
Franconia CDP, Virginia – Racial and ethnic composition Note: the US Census treats Hispanic/Latino as an ethnic category. This table excludes Latinos from the racial categories and assigns them to a separate category. Hispanics/Latinos may be of any race.
Race / Ethnicity (NH = Non-Hispanic)	Pop 2000	Pop 2010	Pop 2020	% 2000	% 2010	% 2020
White alone (NH)	20,744	9,362	8,170	65.01%	51.31%	43.13%
Black or African American alone (NH)	4,263	3,309	3,766	13.36%	18.14%	19.88%
Native American or Alaska Native alone (NH)	76	37	54	0.24%	0.20%	0.29%
Asian alone (NH)	3,401	2,619	3,108	10.66%	14.35%	16.41%
Native Hawaiian or Pacific Islander alone (NH)	31	21	39	0.10%	0.12%	0.21%
Other race alone (NH)	91	41	104	0.29%	0.22%	0.55%
Mixed race or Multiracial (NH)	964	656	1,126	3.02%	3.60%	5.94%
Hispanic or Latino (any race)	2,337	2,200	2,576	7.32%	12.06%	13.60%
Total	31,907	18,245	18,943	100.00%	100.00%	100.00%

=== 2020 census ===
As of the 2020 census, Franconia had a population of 18,943. The population density was 5,459.1 inhabitants per square mile (2,107.1/km^{2}). The median age was 38.1 years. 21.8% of residents were under the age of 18 and 11.0% of residents were 65 years of age or older. For every 100 females there were 90.9 males, and for every 100 females age 18 and over there were 88.0 males age 18 and over.

100.0% of residents lived in urban areas, while 0.0% lived in rural areas.

There were 7,516 households, of which 32.7% had children under the age of 18 living in them. Of all households, 49.7% were married-couple households, 16.3% were households with a male householder and no spouse or partner present, and 28.6% were households with a female householder and no spouse or partner present. About 28.0% of all households were made up of individuals and 6.8% had someone living alone who was 65 years of age or older.

There were 7,698 housing units at an average density of 2,218.4 per square mile (856.3/km^{2}); 2.4% were vacant. The homeowner vacancy rate was 0.6% and the rental vacancy rate was 3.2%.

Racial composition as of the 2020 census
Race	Number	Percent
White	8,595	45.4%
Black or African American	3,857	20.4%
American Indian and Alaska Native	118	0.6%
Asian	3,149	16.6%
Native Hawaiian and Other Pacific Islander	40	0.2%
Some other race	916	4.8%
Two or more races	2,268	12.0%
Hispanic or Latino (of any race)	2,576	13.6%

=== 2010 census ===
The population was 18,245 at the 2010 census, down from 31,907 in 2000 due to the splitting off of part of it to form the Kingstowne CDP.

=== 2000 census ===
As of the census of 2000, there were 31,907 people, 13,284 households, and 8,182 families residing in the CDP. The population density was 4,465.3 inhabitants per square mile (1,724.1/km^{2}). There were 13,509 housing units at an average density of 1,890.6 per square mile (730.0/km^{2}). The racial makeup of the CDP was 69.26% White, 13.57% African American, 0.30% Native American, 10.72% Asian, 0.11% Pacific Islander, 2.28% from other races, and 3.77% from two or more races. Hispanic or Latino of any race were 7.32% of the population.

There were 13,284 households, out of which 29.6% had children under the age of 18 living with them, 50.4% were married couples living together, 8.5% had a female householder with no husband present, and 38.4% were non-families. 28.5% of all households were made up of individuals, and 2.5% had someone living alone who was 65 years of age or older. The average household size was 2.40 and the average family size was 3.01.

In the CDP, the population was spread out, with 21.9% under the age of 18, 6.2% from 18 to 24, 43.4% from 25 to 44, 23.8% from 45 to 64, and 4.7% who were 65 years of age or older. The median age was 35 years. For every 100 females, there were 92.6 males. For every 100 females age 18 and over, there were 88.8 males.

According to a 2007 estimate, the median income for a household in the CDP was $100,161, and the median income for a family was $106,998. Males had a median income of $56,890 versus $46,138 for females. The per capita income for the CDP was $37,134. About 1.8% of families and 2.8% of the population were below the poverty line, including 3.2% of those under age 18 and 2.2% of those age 65 or over.
