= Groveton, Virginia =

- Census-designated place
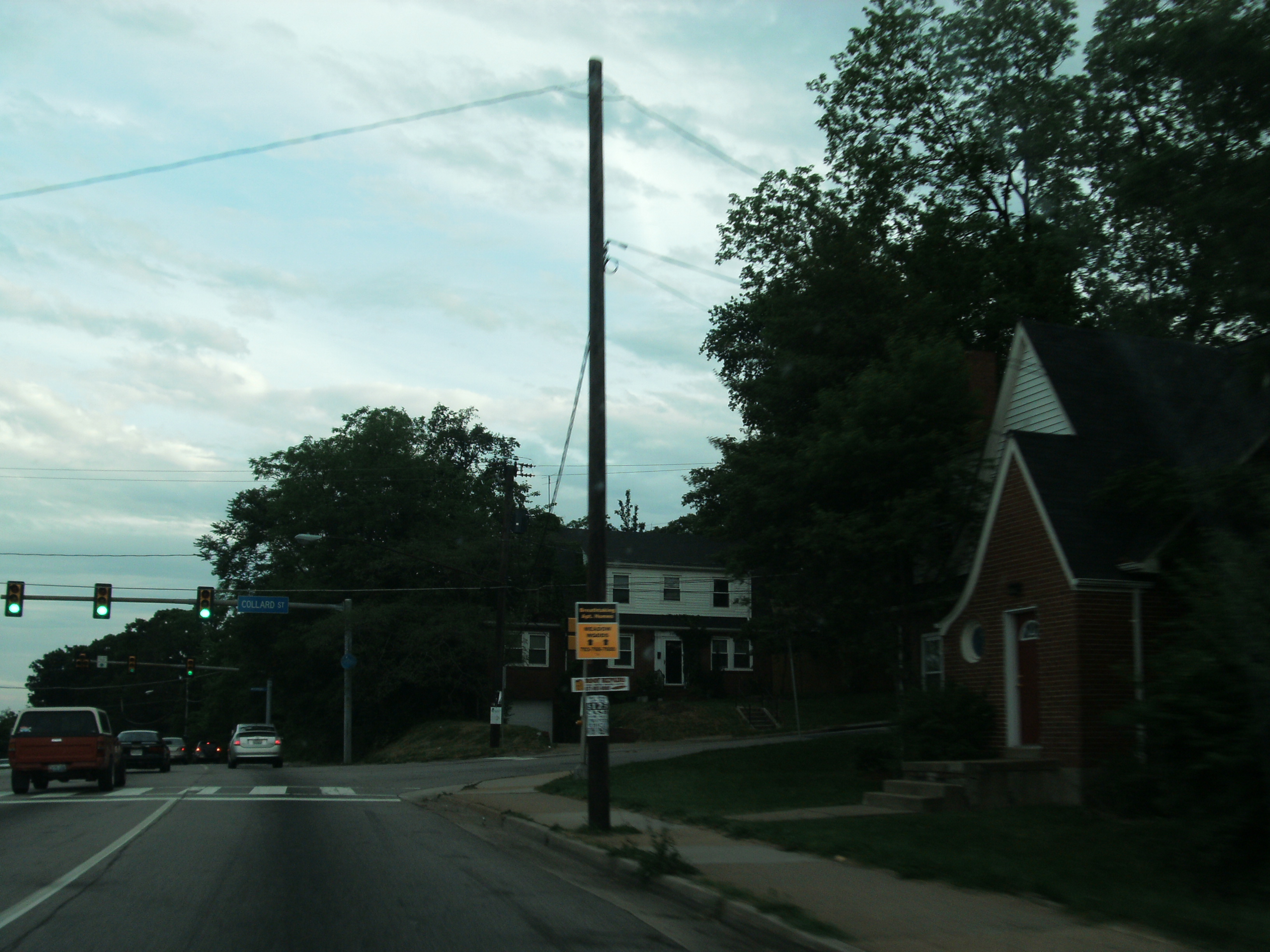
- Houses in Groveton, along US Rte. 1

- Location of Groveton in Fairfax County, Virginia

- Location within Northern Virginia Location within Virginia Location within the United States
- Coordinates: 38°46′26″N 77°5′16″W
- Country: United States
- State: Virginia
- County: Fairfax

Area
  - Total: 4.4 sq mi (11.4 km^{2})
  - Land: 4.3 sq mi (11.2 km^{2})
  - Water: 0.077 sq mi (0.2 km^{2})
- Elevation: 200 ft (60 m)

Population (2020)
  - Total: 15,725
  - Density: 3,363/sq mi (1,298.4/km^{2})
- Time zone: UTC−5 (Eastern (EST))
  - Summer (DST): UTC−4 (EDT)
- FIPS code: 51-33584
- GNIS feature ID: 1493043

Groveton is a census-designated place (CDP) in Fairfax County, Virginia, United States. As of the 2020 census, Groveton had a population of 15,725. Located south of the city of Alexandria, it encompasses numerous neighborhoods including Groveton, Bucknell Manor, Stoneybrooke, and portions of Hollin Hills. Huntley Meadows Park, Fairfax County's largest park, is located in the southwest part of the CDP.

== Geography ==
Groveton is in southeastern Fairfax County, bordered to the north by Rose Hill, to the northeast by Belle Haven, to the southeast by Fort Hunt and Hybla Valley, to the south by Woodlawn, to the southwest by Fort Belvoir, and to the west by Hayfield. U.S. Route 1 (Richmond Highway) passes through the developed center of Groveton in the eastern part of the CDP, leading northeast 3 miles (5 km) into Old Town Alexandria and 10 miles (16 km) into Washington, D.C., as well as southwest 13 miles (21 km) to Woodbridge. The Route 1 commercial area includes the Beacon Hill Shopping Center and surrounding retail stores, all of which run north towards Huntington.

According to the United States Census Bureau, the Groveton CDP has a total area of 4.4 square miles (11.4 km^{2}), of which 4.3 square miles (11.2 km^{2}) is land and 0.08 square miles (0.2 km^{2}), or 1.46%, is water.

== Demographics ==
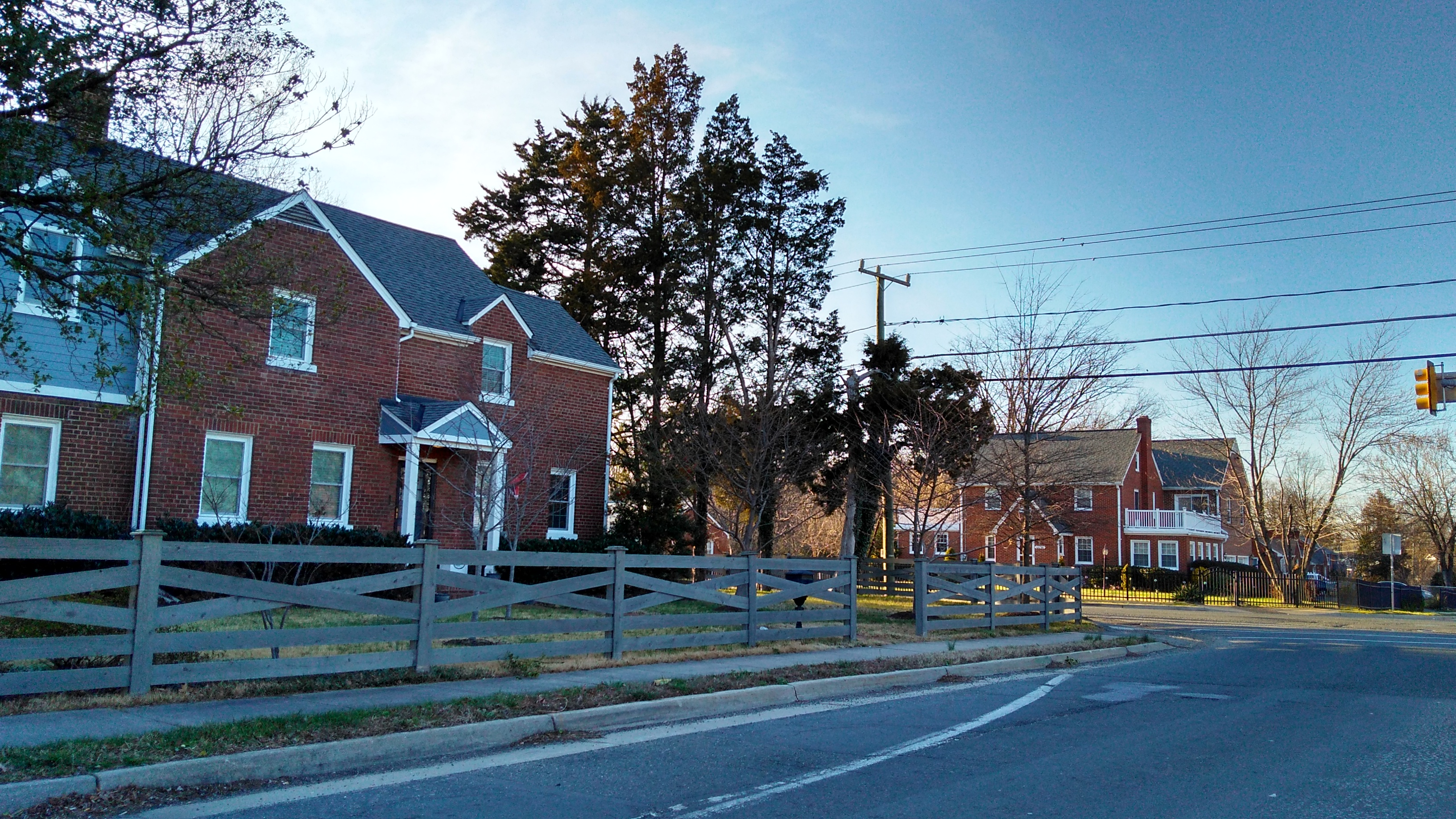
Houses in Groveton

=== Racial and ethnic composition ===
Groveton CDP, Virginia – Racial and ethnic composition Note: the US Census treats Hispanic/Latino as an ethnic category. This table excludes Latinos from the racial categories and assigns them to a separate category. Hispanics/Latinos may be of any race.
Race / Ethnicity (NH = Non-Hispanic)	Pop 2000	Pop 2010	Pop 2020	% 2000	% 2010	% 2020
White alone (NH)	10,976	5,687	5,538	51.54%	38.96%	35.22%
Black or African American alone (NH)	4,038	3,218	2,868	18.96%	22.04%	18.24%
Native American or Alaska Native alone (NH)	46	33	17	0.22%	0.23%	0.11%
Asian alone (NH)	1,641	1,159	1,303	7.71%	7.94%	8.29%
Native Hawaiian or Pacific Islander alone (NH)	18	7	16	0.08%	0.05%	0.10%
Other race alone (NH)	55	31	96	0.26%	0.21%	0.61%
Mixed race or Multiracial (NH)	567	340	610	2.66%	2.33%	3.88%
Hispanic or Latino (any race)	3,955	4,123	5,277	18.57%	28.24%	33.56%
Total	21,296	14,598	15,725	100.00%	100.00%	100.00%

=== 2020 census ===
As of the 2020 census, Groveton had a population of 15,725. The median age was 36.2 years. 24.0% of residents were under the age of 18 and 11.9% of residents were 65 years of age or older. For every 100 females there were 99.8 males, and for every 100 females age 18 and over there were 96.8 males age 18 and over.

100.0% of residents lived in urban areas, while 0.0% lived in rural areas.

There were 5,600 households in Groveton, of which 34.5% had children under the age of 18 living in them. Of all households, 47.2% were married-couple households, 19.9% were households with a male householder and no spouse or partner present, and 26.7% were households with a female householder and no spouse or partner present. About 26.3% of all households were made up of individuals and 7.7% had someone living alone who was 65 years of age or older.

There were 5,817 housing units, of which 3.7% were vacant. The homeowner vacancy rate was 0.6% and the rental vacancy rate was 4.3%.

=== 2000 census ===
As of the census of 2000, there were 21,296 people, 8,076 households, and 5,297 families residing in the CDP. The population density was 3,462.2 inhabitants per square mile (1,336.8/km^{2}). There were 8,275 housing units at an average density of 1,345.3 per square mile (519.4/km^{2}). The racial makeup of the CDP was 58.65% White, 19.37% African American, 0.31% Native American, 7.75% Asian, 0.10% Pacific Islander, 9.36% from other races, and 4.46% from two or more races. Hispanic or Latino of any race were 18.57% of the population.

There were 8,076 households, out of which 32.5% had children under the age of 18 living with them, 48.1% were married couples living together, 12.3% had a female householder with no husband present, and 34.4% were non-families. 26.0% of all households were made up of individuals, and 6.2% had someone living alone who was 65 years of age or older. The average household size was 2.63 and the average family size was 3.17.

In the CDP, the population was spread out, with 24.5% under the age of 18, 8.6% from 18 to 24, 36.5% from 25 to 44, 22.1% from 45 to 64, and 8.3% who were 65 years of age or older. The median age was 35 years. For every 100 females, there were 98.8 males. For every 100 females age 18 and over, there were 97.8 males.

The median income for a household in the CDP was $60,150, and the median income for a family was $67,605. Males had a median income of $42,002 versus $38,149 for females. The per capita income for the CDP was $27,697. About 3.7% of families and 6.8% of the population were below the poverty line, including 7.2% of those under age 18 and 6.6% of those age 65 or over.

== Education ==
Fairfax County Public Schools operates public schools. Groveton High School, which served the community since 1959, was renamed in the mid-1980s as West Potomac High School, which also serves Fort Hunt.

Fairfax County Public Library operates the Martha Washington Library in the CDP.
