= Springfield Town Center =

Shopping center in Springfield, Virginia

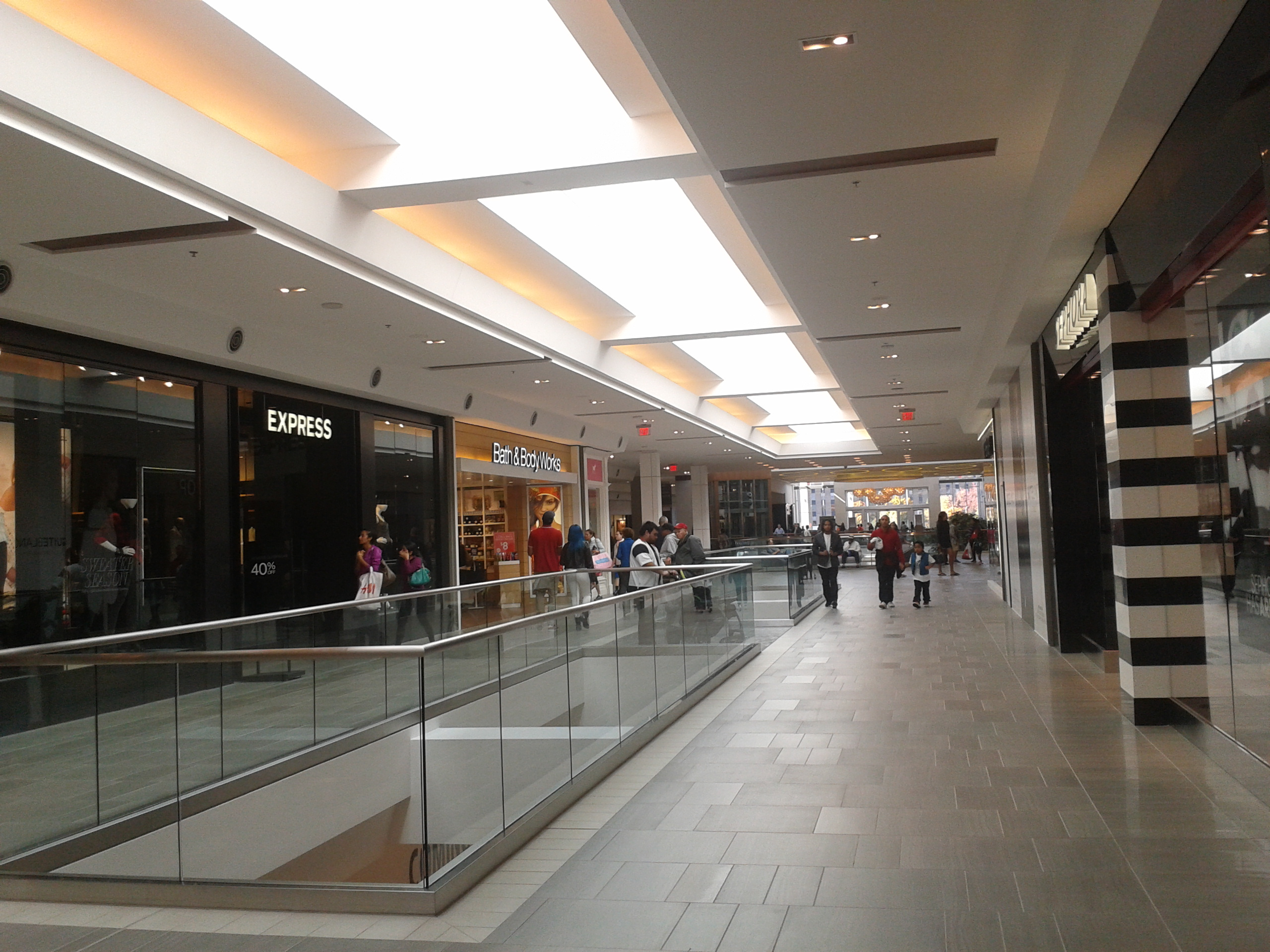
- Interior of the Springfield Town Center, second level
- Location: Springfield, Virginia, United States
- Coordinates: 38.774558°N 77.1749812°W
- Address: 6500 Springfield Mall, Springfield, VA 22150
- Opened: May 7, 1973; 53 years ago (as Springfield Mall); October 17, 2014; 12 years ago (as Springfield Town Center)
- Developer: Arthur M. Fischer Inc. and Franconia Associates
- Manager: PREIT
- Owner: PREIT
- Num. of stores: 155
- Num. of anchor tenants: 8 (1 under construction)
- Floor area: 1,700,000 sq ft (160,000 m^{2})
- Floors: 2 (3 in Macy's)
- Parking: 8,100 parking spaces (four levels in the Loisdale garage and six levels in the Frontier garage plus uncovered lots)
- Public transit: Washington Metro: at Franconia-Springfield; Fairfax Connector: 310, 321, 322, 334, 350, 351, 401, 402, 494
- Website: springfieldtowncenter.com

Springfield Town Center is an enclosed shopping center located in the Springfield census-designated place (CDP) of unincorporated Fairfax County, Virginia. It opened in 1973 as Springfield Mall, an enclosed shopping mall, which closed on June 30, 2012 as part of a multimillion-dollar redevelopment plan to turn it into a multifaceted "Town Center"-style shopping center with a main indoor area similar to the nearby Tysons Corner Center and Dulles Town Center, while transforming the exterior into a pedestrian friendly environment with restaurants with cafe style outdoor seating and entrances. It is located at the intersection of I-95 and Franconia Road, which is part of the Springfield Interchange, 1/4 mile north of Franconia-Springfield Parkway and the Franconia-Springfield Metro Station. The mall reopened on October 17, 2014, following its two-year renovation.

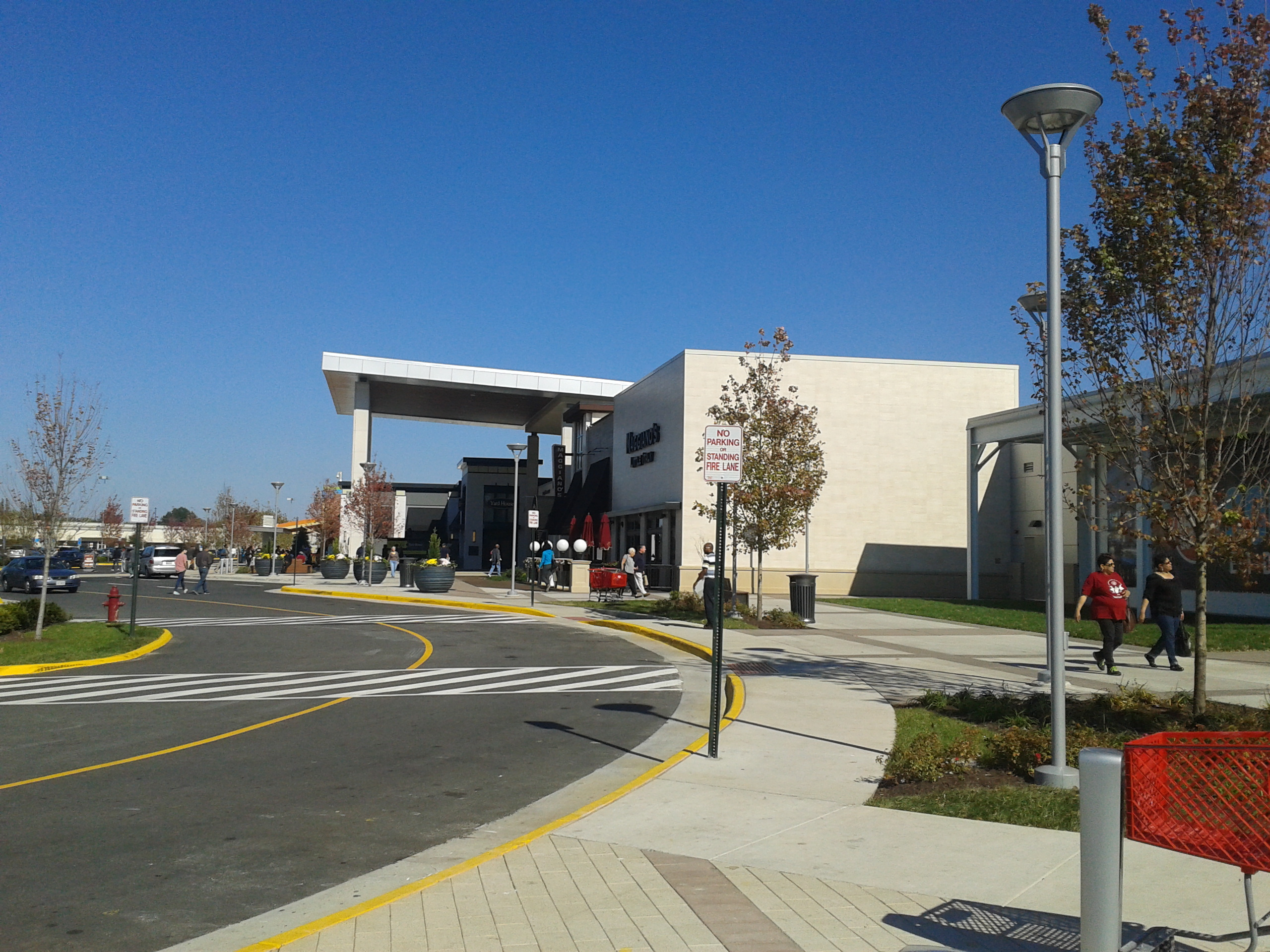
The main entrance of the revitalized Springfield Town Center

Original anchors were Lansburgh's (later E.J. Korvette), Garfinckel's (later Sports Authority), J.C. Penney, and Montgomery Ward (later Target). Macy's was added in August 1991. The mall was notable for having one of the top two performing locations of the Time Out chain of amusement arcades, which featured in its mall rat culture during the 1980s golden age of arcades.

Prince Charles and Princess Diana visited the JCPenney store at the mall on November 11, 1985, during their famous American tour. However, the mall's fortunes declined in the 1990s and 2000s. Its DMV office was where Hani Hanjour and Khalid al-Mihdhar, two of the hijackers in the September 11 attacks, illegally obtained state identification. The mall also experienced two gang-related stabbings in 2005, two fatal shootings, one in December 2007 and one in June 2022 and a fatal carjacking in September 2008.

One of the largest malls in Northern Virginia, it was owned and operated by Vornado Realty Trust. In 2005, Vornado purchased an option valued at $36 million to buy the mall from the previous owners Franconia Two LP. In early 2006, Vornado purchased the mall for an additional $80 million along with plans to redevelop.

In March 2012, Vornado announced plans to close all but the three anchor stores starting on July 1, ahead of the two-year renovation and redevelopment, which is part of a decade-long plan intended to turn the Mall and its surrounding area into the new Springfield Town Center. Springfield Town Center re-opened on October 17, 2014.

In 2014, the center was sold to PREIT for $465 million. In late 2015, Dave and Buster's, a popular family owned entertainment and sports bar opened.

In August 2023, LEGO Discovery Center Washington DC opened at the property. The 32,000 square foot indoor attraction is co-created by Merlin & the LEGO Group and is located at the main entrance to the property.

On February 9, 2026, JCPenney announced that it would close its Springfield Town Center location, citing its current lease terms. The store closed on May 24, 2026. In May 2026, it was announced that Dick’s Sporting Goods plans to introduce one of their large format Dick’s House of Sport concept stores in the former JCPenney space.
