= Hermitage Road Warehouse Historic District =

Historic district in Virginia, United States

- U.S. National Register of Historic Places
- U.S. Historic district
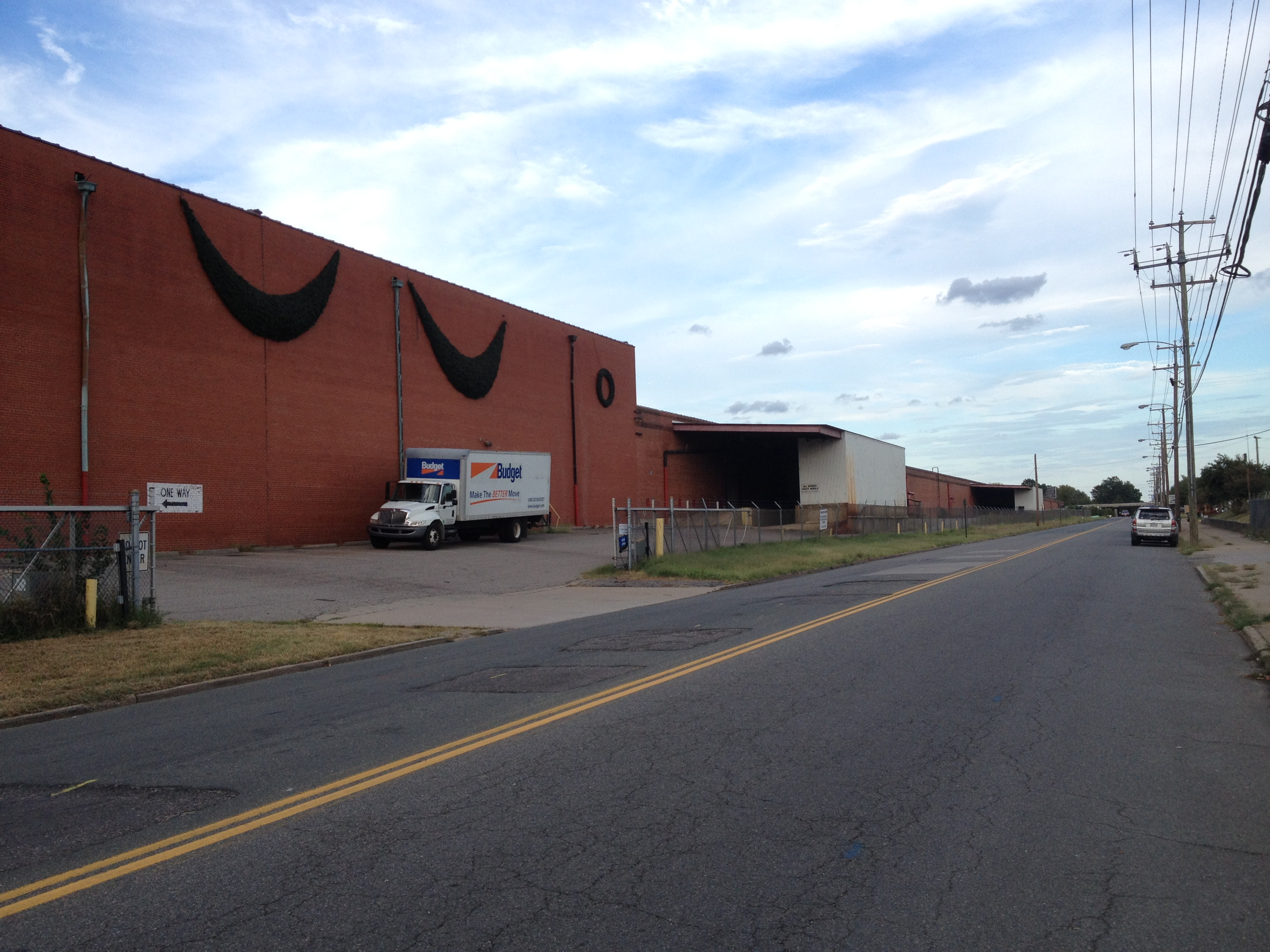

- Location within Virginia Location within the United States
- Location: Bounded by Hermitage & Overbrook Rds., Sherwood Ave., I-95, Richmond, Virginia
- Coordinates: 37°34′6″N 77°27′32″W
- Area: 47 acres (19 ha)
- Built: 1918
- NRHP reference No.: 14000302 (original); 100009430 (increase)

Significant dates
- Added to NRHP: June 9, 2014
- Boundary increase: October 5, 2023

The Hermitage Road Warehouse Historic District encompasses an industrial district in northern Richmond, Virginia. It is bounded on the west by Hermitage Street, on the east by Interstate 95, on the north by Sherwood Avenue, and on the south by Overbrook Road. This area, which contains mainly warehouses, was developed between 1918 and the 1950s, with most development taking place in the last decade of that period. The warehouses are generally single-story brick structures, although detailing appears in a variety of architectural styles. There are several multi-story buildings, notably a six-story office block attached to the warehouse of the A. H. Robins building. The land was originally owned by A. D. Williams, who began selling it off for development in 1918. Eastward development of the area was halted by the construction of I-95, and only one building was built after 1960.

The district was listed on the National Register of Historic Places in 2014, with a boundary increase in 2023.

== See also ==
- National Register of Historic Places listings in Richmond, Virginia
