= Elmont =

Elmont may refer to:

== Places ==
In the United States

- Elmont, Missouri
- Elmont, New York
  - Elmont station, a Long Island Rail Road station in Elmont, New York
- Elmont, Virginia

== Fictional people ==
- Elmont (Doonesbury), a character in the Doonesbury comic strip

== People with the surname ==
- Dex Elmont (born 1984), Dutch judoka
- Guillaume Elmont (born 1981), Dutch judoka
- Ilonka Elmont, Surinamese-Dutch mixed martial artist
