= Virginia State Route 789 =

Secondary route designation

State Route 789

Route information
- Maintained by VDOT

Location
- Country: United States
- State: Virginia

Highway system
- Virginia Routes; Interstate; US; Primary; Secondary; Byways; History; HOT lanes

State Route 789 (SR 789) in the U.S. state of Virginia is a secondary route designation applied to multiple discontinuous road segments among the many counties. The list below describes the sections in each county that are designated SR 789.

== List ==
| County | Length (mi) | Length (km) | From | Via | To | Notes |
|---|---|---|---|---|---|---|
| Accomack | 3.26 | 5.25 | SR 605 (Seaside Road) | Locustville Road Main Street | US 13 Bus (Coastal Avenue) | |
| Albemarle | 0.65 | 1.05 | SR 788 (Railroad Avenue) | Buck Road | SR 810 (Crozet Avenue) | |
| Amherst | 0.10 | 0.16 | Dead End | Oakwood Drive | SR 130 (Elon Road) | |
| Augusta | 1.65 | 2.66 | SR 792 (Indian Mound Road) | Pleasant Grove Road | SR 612 (Laurel Hill Road) | |
| Bedford | 0.10 | 0.16 | US 501 (Lee Jackson Highway) | Melody Lane | Dead End | |
| Botetourt | 0.30 | 0.48 | SR 788 (Old Sessler Mill Road) | Blackberry Lane | Cul-de-Sac | |
| Campbell | 0.30 | 0.48 | US 460 Bus | Lake Court Avenue | Cul-de-Sac | |
| Carroll | 0.70 | 1.13 | SR 700 (Heritage Road) | High Point Road | SR 711 (Apache Road) | |
| Chesterfield | 0.91 | 1.46 | SR 1968 (Beaudet Lane) | Belleau Drive Brown Road | Dead End | |
| Fairfax | 4.10 | 6.60 | SR 877 (Newington Road) | Loisdale Road Commerce Street | SR 644 (Old Keene Mill Road) | |
| Fauquier | 0.82 | 1.32 | SR 651 (Sumerduck Road) | Hardins Pines Road | Dead End | |
| Franklin | 5.86 | 9.43 | Dead End | Longbranch Hill Road Dry Hill Road | SR 788 (Buffalo Ridge Road/Dry Hill Road) | |
| Frederick | 0.70 | 1.13 | SR 679 (Indian Hollow Road) | Bryarly Road | US 522/SR 678 | |
| Halifax | 1.00 | 1.61 | SR 746 (Mount Laurel Road) | Lacks Town Road | Dead End | |
| Hanover | 0.65 | 1.05 | Dead End | Hickory Oaks Lane | SR 54 (West Patrick Henry Road) | |
| Henry | 1.21 | 1.95 | SR 647 (Mountain Valley Road) | Collins Road | Dead End | |
| Loudoun | 1.14 | 1.83 | SR 606 (Old Ox Road) | Lockridge Road | Dead End | |
| Louisa | 0.17 | 0.27 | US 33 (Jefferson Highway) | C C C Road | Dead End | |
| Mecklenburg | 1.40 | 2.25 | SR 602 (White House Road) | Bowens Road | SR 601 (Love Town Road) | |
| Montgomery | 0.15 | 0.24 | SR 788 (Ivy Lane) | Poppy Lane | Cul-de-Sac | |
| Pittsylvania | 1.10 | 1.77 | SR 790 (Piney Road) | Valley Road | SR 40 (Gretna Road) | |
| Prince William | 0.41 | 0.66 | SR 215 (Vint Hill Road) | Silas Drive | Dead End | |
| Pulaski | 0.10 | 0.16 | SR 624 (New River Road) | School House Lane | Dead End | |
| Roanoke | 0.19 | 0.31 | Dead End | Old Rocky Mount Road | Roanoke city limits | |
| Rockbridge | 0.25 | 0.40 | Dead End | Country Club Road | SR 251/SR 1010 | |
| Rockingham | 4.28 | 6.89 | SR 617 (Spar Mine Road) | Strooptown Road Andrick Road | SR 881 (Orchard Drive) | |
| Scott | 0.70 | 1.13 | Dead End | Campfire Circle Sarah Circle | SR 870 (Daniel Boone Trail) | |
| Shenandoah | 0.30 | 0.48 | SR 691 (Judge Rye Road) | Sam Clark Road | SR 675 (Stoney Creek Road) | |
| Tazewell | 0.10 | 0.16 | Dead End | Hefeder Road | US 19 Bus | |
| Washington | 0.15 | 0.24 | Dead End | Crofton Lane | SR 724 (Beech Grove Road) | |
| Wise | 0.51 | 0.82 | Dead End | Carolina Road | SR 72 | |
| York | 0.15 | 0.24 | SR 713 (Waller Mill Road) | Plantation Drive | Dead End | |
