= James River Bridge (Interstate 95) =

James River Bridge (I-95)
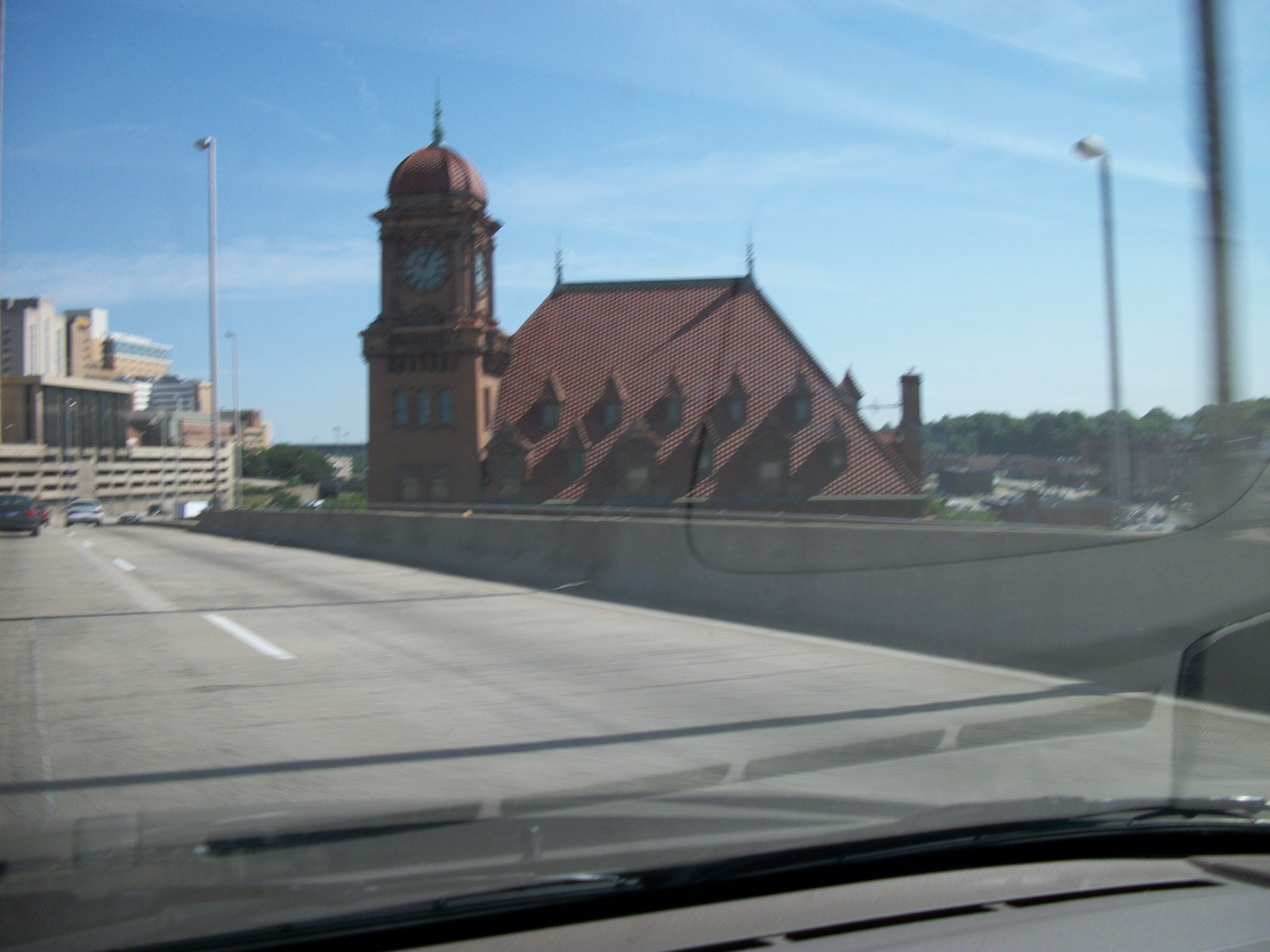
- Main Street Station as seen from the northbound James River Bridge.
- Coordinates: 37°31′41″N 77°25′45″W
- Carries: I-95
- Crosses: James River
- Locale: Richmond, Virginia
- Maintained by: Virginia Department of Transportation

Characteristics
- Total length: 4,185 feet long

History
- Opened: 1958

Statistics
- Toll: none

Location
- Interactive map of James River Bridge (I-95)

The James River Bridge carries Interstate 95 across the James River in Richmond, Virginia.

== History ==
The original 6-lane structure was built in 1957 and 1958 as part of the Richmond-Petersburg Turnpike and was financed with toll revenue bonds issued by the Richmond-Petersburg Turnpike Authority, a political subdivision of the Commonwealth of Virginia.

In 1975, the Virginia Department of Transportation (VDOT) assumed the operations of former Turnpike Authority. Although the initial bonds were retired in 1975, additional tolls were collected to finance improvements along other sections of the former Turnpike.

Beginning in 1976, a complicated connection with the Downtown Expressway—a newer toll road built by the Richmond Metropolitan Authority (RMA)—was constructed on the bridge itself.

Tolls for the bridge and I-95 were finally completely removed in 1992.

The bridge was re-decked by VDOT from 1999 to August 2002.

== Flooding ==
The bridge is high above the river, and is not considered in danger of flooding during periods when the river periodically floods. However, in the past the southern approach has been subject to closure due to flooding of the James River, notably after Hurricane Camille in 1969, Hurricane Agnes in 1972, and Hurricane Gloria in 1985.

Richmond's Flood Wall, designed to prevent a 280-year flood, completed in 1995 at a cost of about $142 million, is hoped to prevent such future closures.
