= Stafford Regional Airport =

Airport in Virginia, United States of America

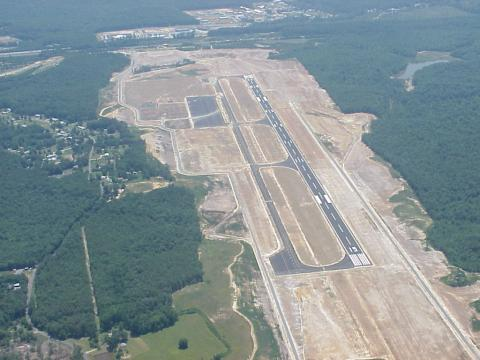
- IATA: none; ICAO: KRMN; FAA LID: RMN

Summary
- Airport type: Public
- Owner/Operator: Stafford Regional Airport Authority
- Location: Stafford, Virginia
- Opened: December 2001
- Elevation AMSL: 211 ft (64 m)
- Coordinates: 38°23′53″N 077°27′20″W
- Website: staffordairport.com

Map
- Location of airport in Virginia / United States RMN (the United States)

Runways
Direction	Length		Surface
Direction	ft	m	Surface
15/33	6,000	1,829	Asphalt

Statistics (2018)
- Aircraft operations: 30,141
- Sources: Federal Aviation Administration Virginia Department of Aviation

Stafford Regional Airport (ICAO: KRMN, FAA LID: RMN) is a public airport located three miles (5 km) southwest of the central business district of Stafford, the county seat of Stafford County, Virginia, United States. The airport is southwest of the intersection of Route 630 and U.S. Route 1 near Interstate 95, approximately 40 miles (64 km) south of Washington, D.C., and 60 miles (97 km) north of Richmond. It is owned and operated by the Stafford Regional Airport Authority, an independent body of representatives from Stafford and Prince William Counties and the City of Fredericksburg.

Although most U.S. airports use the same three-letter location identifier for the FAA and IATA, Stafford Regional Airport is assigned RMN by the FAA but has no designation from the IATA (which assigned RMN to Rumginae, Papua New Guinea).

== Facilities and aircraft ==
Stafford Regional Airport covers an area of 566 acres (229 ha) which contains one asphalt paved runway (15/33) measuring 6,000 x 100 ft (1,829 x 30 m). For the 12-month period ending December 31, 2018, the airport had 30,141 aircraft operations, an average of 83 per day: 93% general aviation and 7% military.

== Accidents ==
The airport was the site of a fatal accident on February 22, 2006, involving a Lancair Columbia 400 piloted by a private pilot. The pilot and three passengers were killed when the aircraft flew into trees surrounding the runway after an aborted landing attempt via ILS. Following an investigation, the NTSB cited pilot error as the most likely cause of the accident.
