= Atlee, Virginia =

Unincorporated community in Virginia, United States

- Unincorporated community
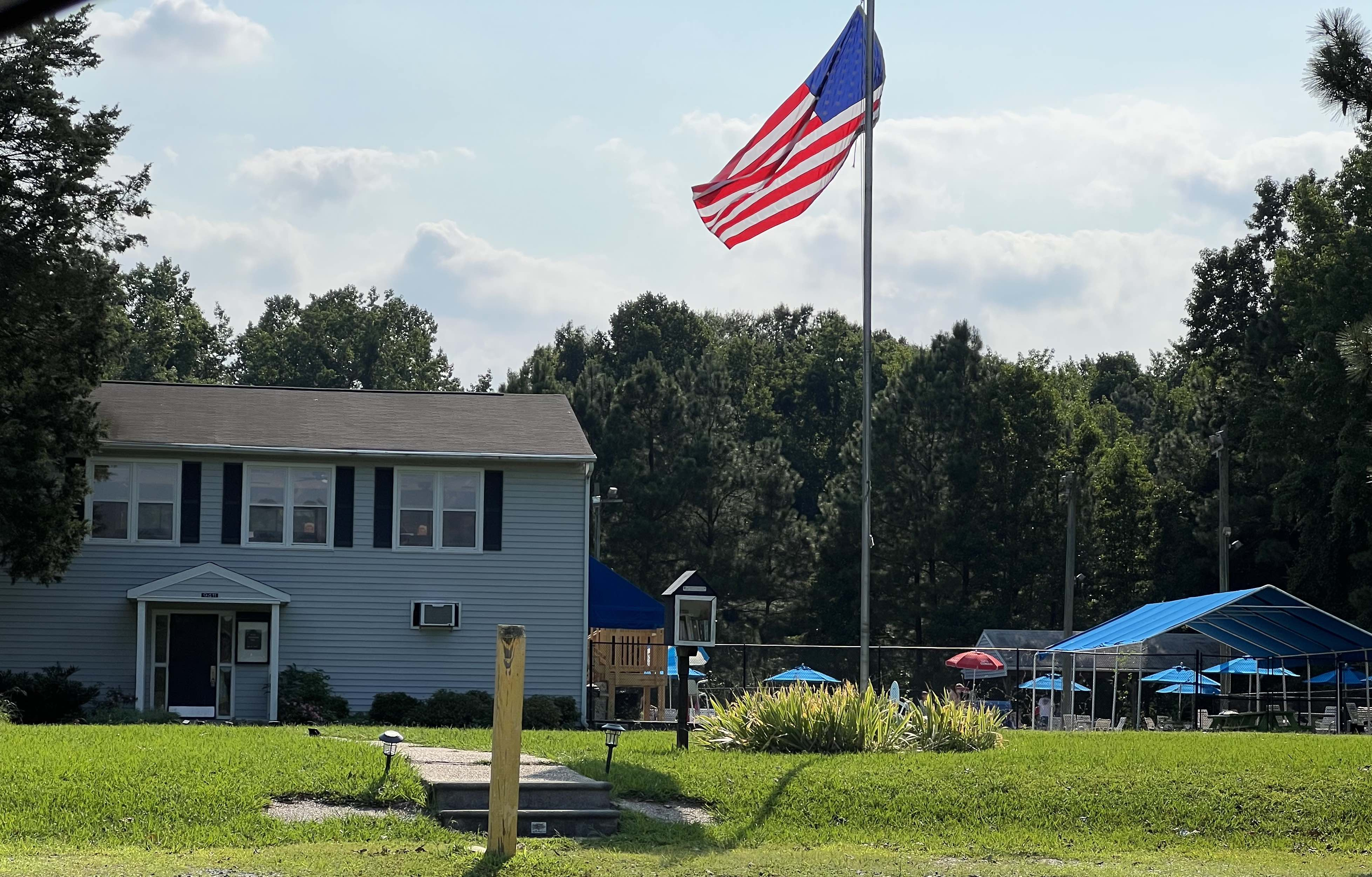
- Atlee Recreation Association

- Location within Virginia Location within the United States
- Coordinates: 37°39′28″N 77°24′25″W
- Country: United States
- State: Virginia
- County: Hanover
- Elevation: 194 ft (59 m)
- Time zone: UTC-5 (Eastern (EST))
  - Summer (DST): UTC-4 (EDT)
- GNIS feature ID: 1499069

Atlee or Atlee Station is an unincorporated community in central Hanover County in the Mid-Atlantic state of Virginia, United States. Atlee is located 11 miles (18 km) north of Richmond on Route 637 approximately .6 miles (0.97 km) north-northwest of the intersection of Route 637 and Virginia State Route 2 and approximately 50 miles (80 km) south of Fredericksburg.

== History ==
Atlee was known for its two train stops and more than likely its name was taken from a delegate to the state legislature who lived in the area, Jacob S. Atlee. There were two stations, West and East Atlee, which were combined in 1921. Until 1931, there was a telegraph office also. In 1947, Atlee became a flag stop until 1960. In the late 1950s, the C&O railroad petitioned the State Corporation Commission for authority to terminate freight handling at Atlee.

== Urban sprawl ==
The Atlee area was mostly rural until the 1980s. Interstate 295 was constructed through the area in the early 1980s, while the widening of U.S. Route 301 from a two-lane highway to a four-lane divided highway in the late 1960s paved the way for master-planned developments such as King's Charter. Atlee is one of the fastest-growing communities in Hanover County and has one of the top school districts in the Commonwealth. Atlee is also home to one of the highest median household income zip codes (23116) in the Commonwealth. Many residents in the area work in Richmond or commute to northern Virginia or Washington D.C. due to Hanover County's central location and three major thoroughfares: U.S. Route 301, Interstate 95 and U.S. Route 1, as well as to the to-be-built high speed rail in nearby Ashland.
