= Springfield Interchange =

Interchange outside of Washington D.C.

- The Springfield Interchange in 2007. In 2012, reversible ramps from the I-95 HOV lanes (now Express Lanes) directly to the Capital Beltway (shown in the map below) were built.
- Interactive map of Springfield Interchange

Location
- Springfield, Virginia
- Coordinates: 38.791°N 77.176°W
- Roads at junction: I-95; I-395; I-495; SR 644

Construction
- Type: Interchange
- Constructed: 1964
- Maintained by: VDOT

The Springfield Interchange, also known as the Mixing Bowl, is the interchange of I-95, I-395, and the Capital Beltway I-495 in Springfield, Virginia, outside of Washington, D.C. The interchange is located at exit 57 on the Capital Beltway, exit 170 on I-95, and exit 1 on I-395.

Some people, including many Washington-area media sources, refer to this interchange as the "Mixing Bowl" because, prior to the reconstruction, local and long-distance travelers shared the same lanes and travelers had to merge to the right or left to reach the correct lanes for their destination. The last of this weaving and merging was eliminated on April 21, 2007.

== History ==
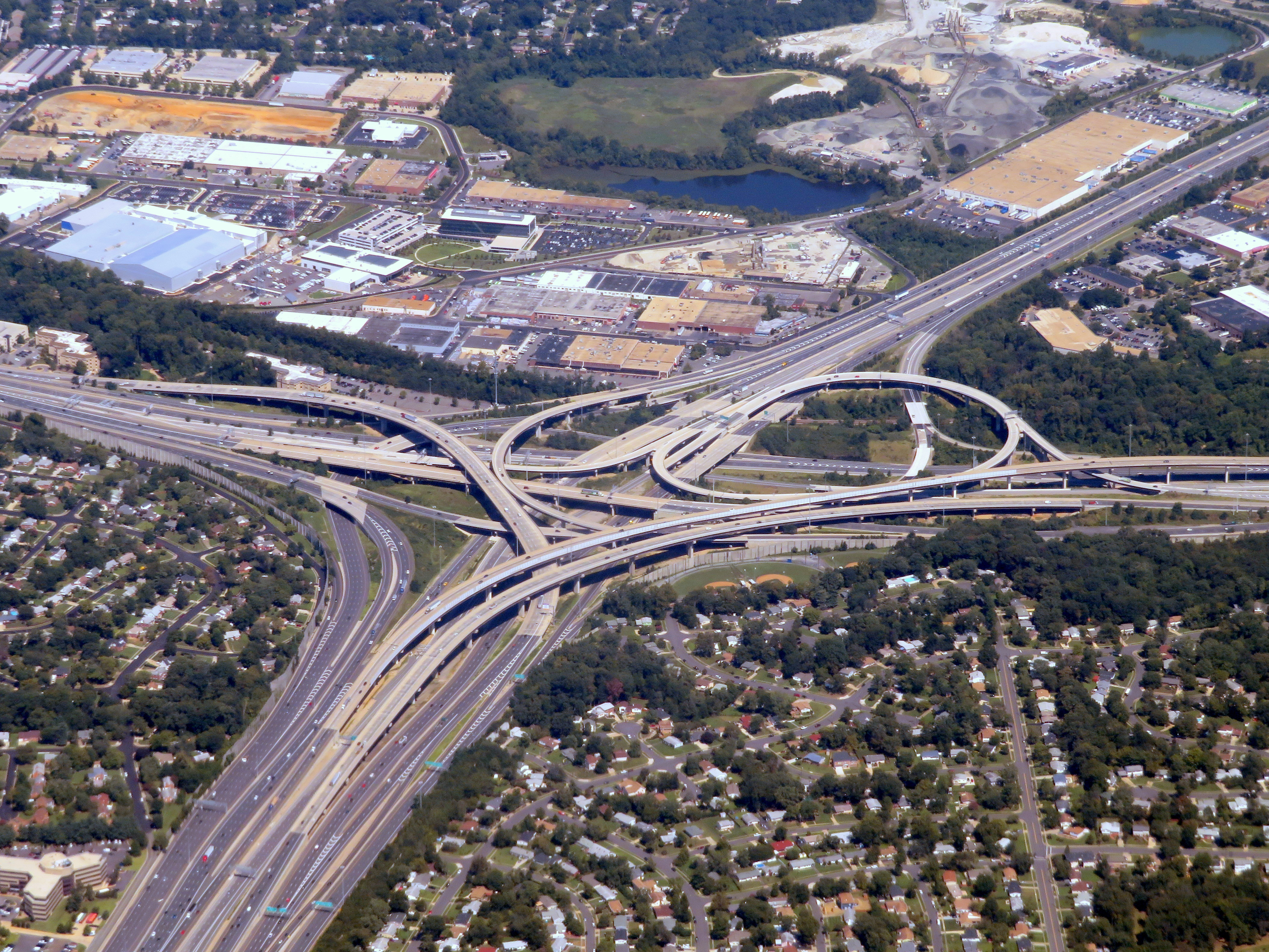
Aerial view in 2018

The interchange was originally built completed in 1964 as a simple interchange between I-95 and the Capital Beltway.

In 1966, only two years after completion, work to adjust the ramps onto the Shirley Highway began. It was completed in 1968.

After community opposition prevented its construction through the city, a project began in 1974 to reconstruct the interchange. It involved replacing the semi-directional ramp from I-95 northbound to I-495 westbound with the large 2-lane 35-mph loop ramp. This was completed in 1977, at this point I-95 was shifted to the eastern portion of the Beltway, between Springfield and College Park, eliminating the I-495 designation there. Because of this route change, all traffic continuing on I-95 through the Washington area was exiting at Springfield through an interchange not designed for that purpose.

In 1989, the I-495 designation was restored.

== Major reconstruction (1999–2007) ==
By early 1970, there were 150,000 vehicles per day traveling through the intersection. Thirty years later, that number had more than doubled, with the effect that vehicles "traveling along the East Coast's main north–south artery [had to] be funneled through the ordinary exit ramps at Springfield, routinely causing backups several miles long." A study by the National Highway Traffic Safety Administration determined the interchange to be the site of 179 crashes between 1993 and 1994 more than any other spot on I-95 and found that the number of ramp accidents was more than double that of any other Beltway interchange. In March 1999, the Virginia Department of Transportation began an eight-year, seven-phase reconstruction project, which also involved the reconstruction of the I-95/Route 644 interchange. The project was one of the largest highway construction projects in the U.S., costing $676 million.

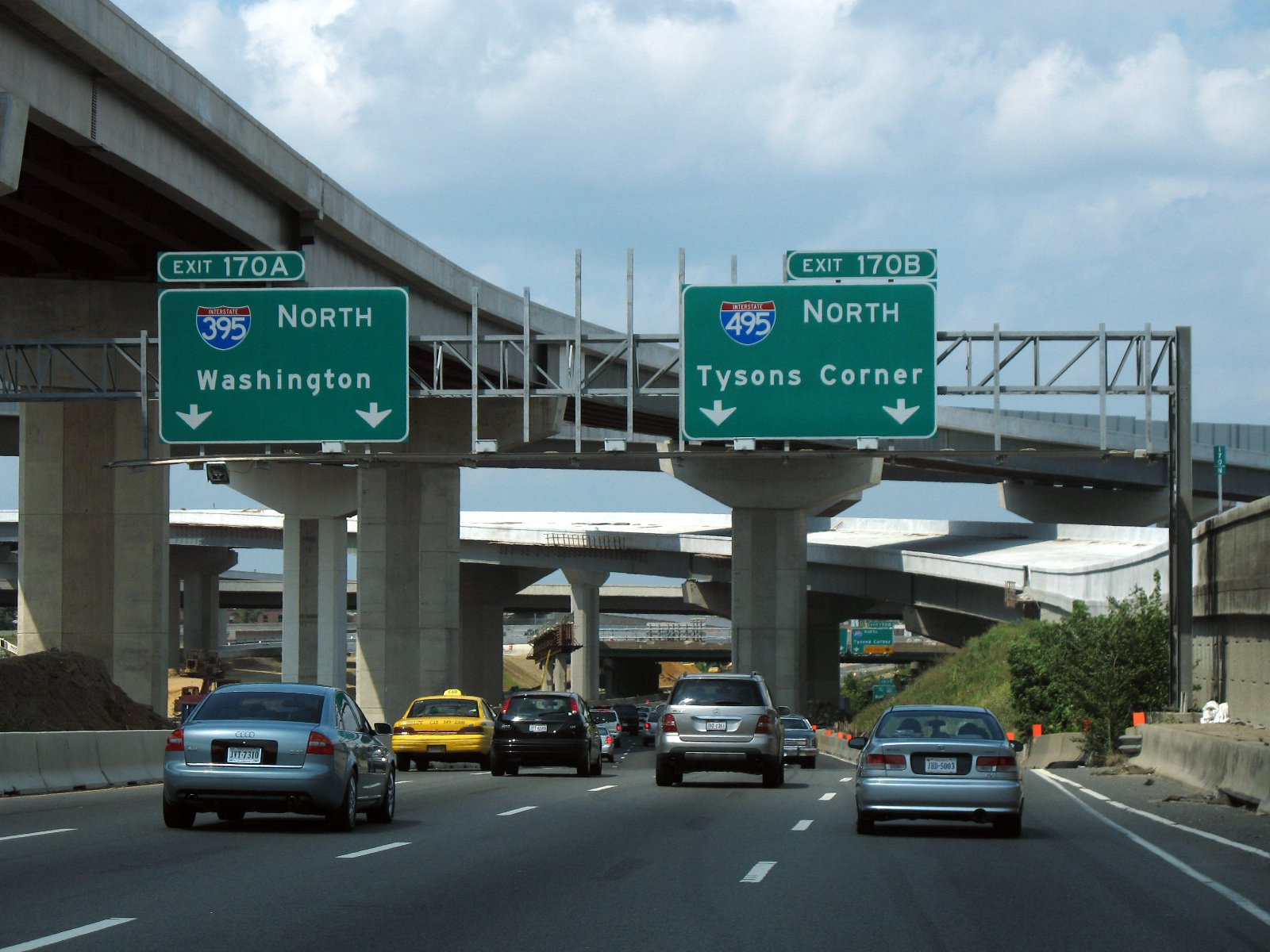
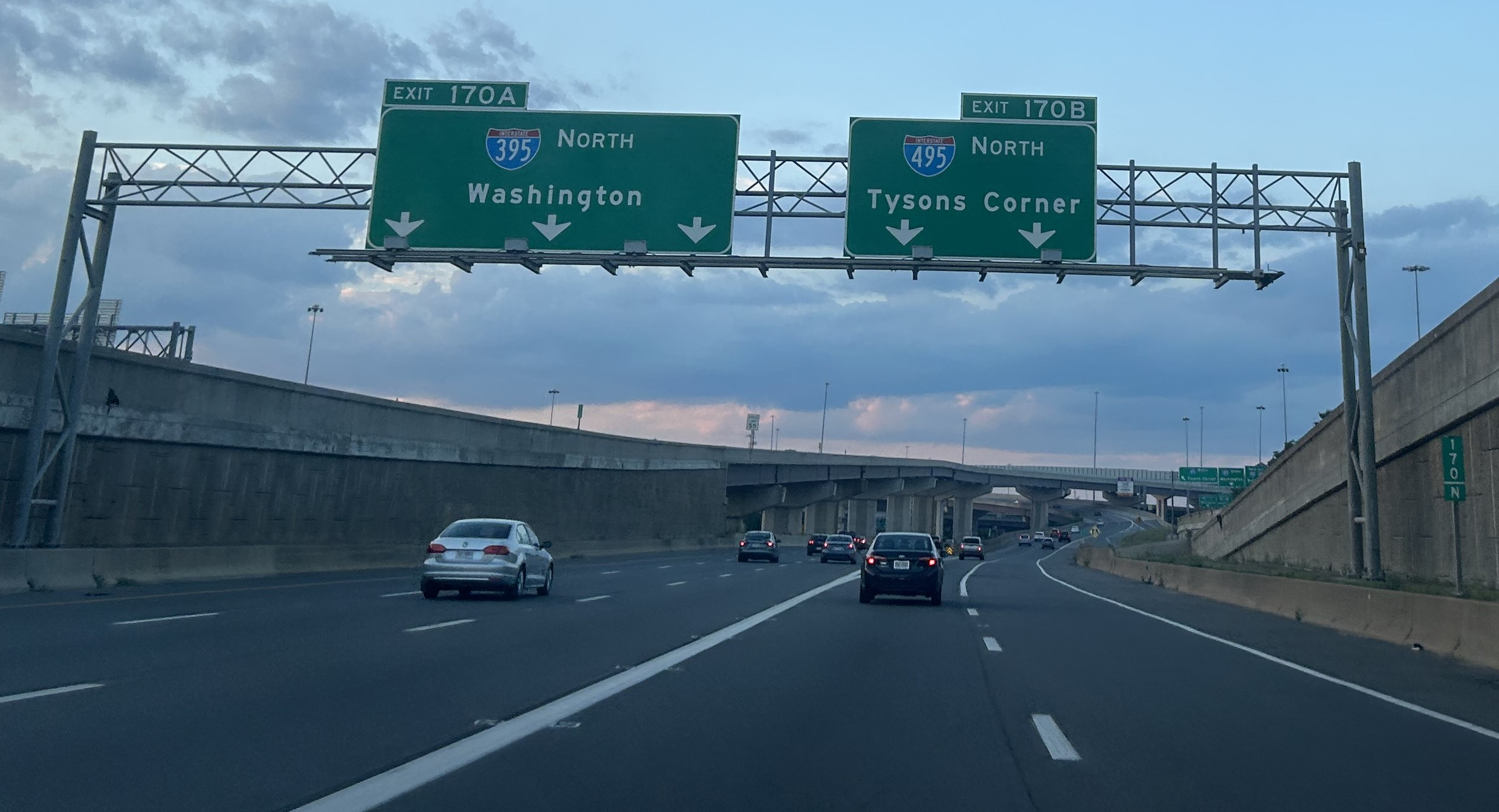
Springfield Interchange's Exit 170A–B split in July 2006 (left) and July 2024 (right). Exit 170B toward I-495 north currently uses a flyover ramp as pictured on the right. Prior to Exit 170B's reconstruction, said exit had a different configuration as pictured on the left, with the ramp under construction to the right of the road being the exit's future flyover ramp that opened in August 2006.

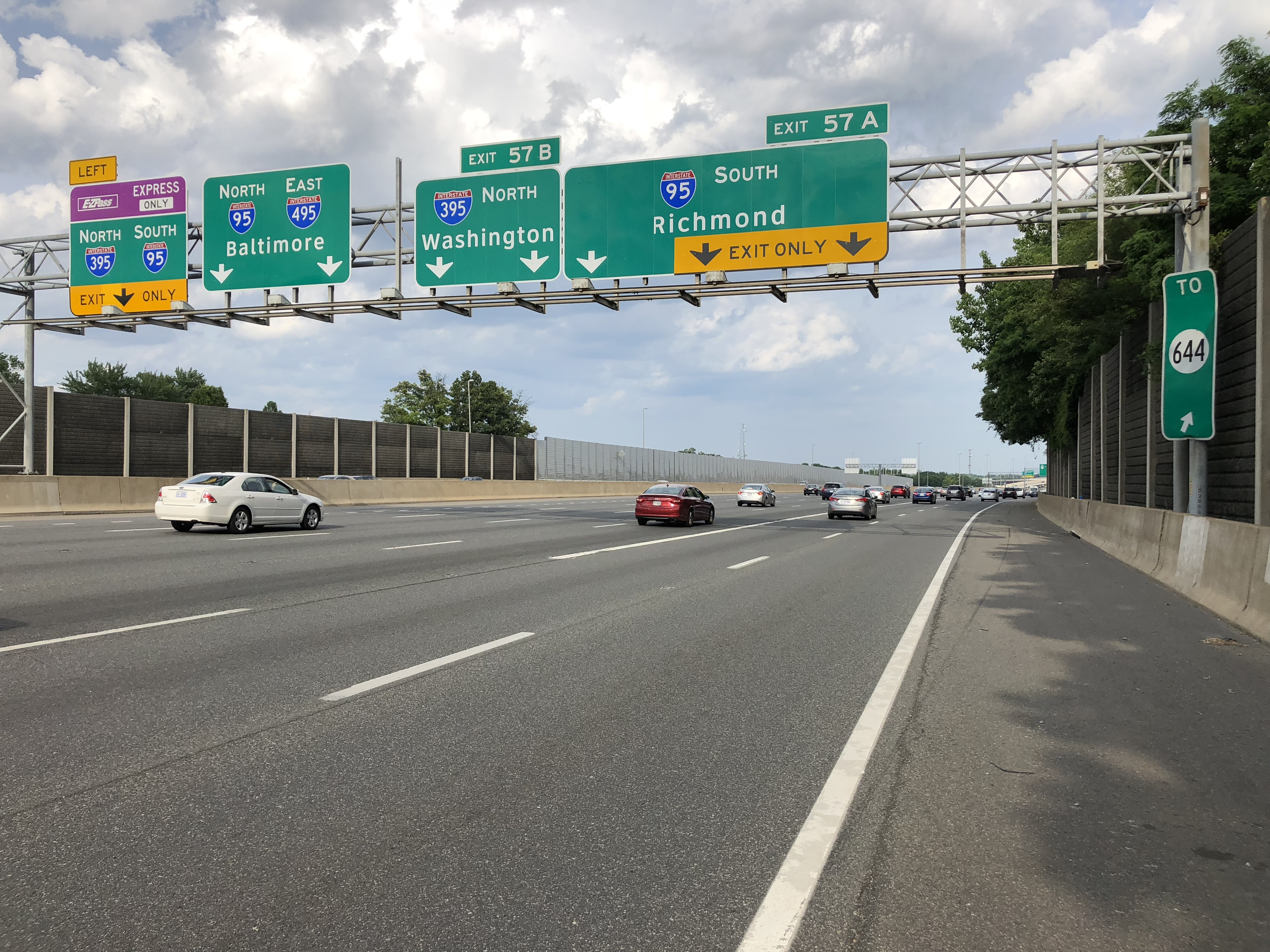
Overhead signs (installed in late 2014) along I-495 approaching the interchange from the northwest. Since 2012, commuters can access the I-95 Express Lanes directly from the Beltway and vice versa.

=== Phase 1 ===
Completed 1999

- Add another lane to southbound Interstate 95.

=== Phases 2 and 3 ===
Completed November 2001

- Reconstruct the I-95/Route 644 interchange.
- Make the I-95 Northbound entry ramp from eastbound Route 644 enter on the right.
- Reconstruct the Commerce Street Bridge.
- Improve the Amherst Street Bridge.
- Construct a flyover from westbound Route 644 onto I-95 south and therefore demolish the original cloverleaf that served this purpose
- Add an express bridge for Route 644
- Make the I-95 North ramp onto Exit 169 separate from I-95
- Add a cloverleaf ramp from I-95 North onto Route 644 westbound
- Construct a bridge from eastbound Route 644 onto the I-95 Express Lanes (northbound only).
- Reconstruct the I-95 Express Lane ramp (southbound only) onto Route 644 westbound.

=== Phase 4 ===
Completed October 2004

- Relocate the Outer Loop, eastbound I-495, where it crosses I-395, this time making it a higher bridge.
- Add a two-lane flyover bridge from I-495 West/I-95 South/Capital Beltway Inner Loop, back to I-95 South (even this bridge is sometimes congested during afternoon hours).

=== Phase 5 ===
Completed May 2004

- Reconstruct the ramp from I-395 Southbound onto I-495 North/Capital Beltway Inner Loop
- Widen a small portion of the Capital Beltway northwest of I-395

=== Phases 6 and 7 ===
Completed July 2007

- Construct a one-lane flyover connecting I-395 South onto I-95 North/I-495 Outer Loop, opened on October 2, 2005.
- Construct a flyover connecting I-395 South and I-495 Outer Loop onto the Route 644 exit, opened on October 5, 2005.
- Construct a two-lane flyover for I-95 North express travelers onto I-495 Outer Loop, opened on January 19, 2006.
- Construct a three-lane flyover connecting I-95 North onto I-495 Inner Loop and therefore demolish the old cloverleaf ramp serving this purpose, opened on August 24, 2006.
- Construct a new two-lane bridge, exiting the Beltway from the right lane as opposed to the old ramp that exited on the left, connecting I-495 Outer Loop with I-395 North, opened on March 15, 2007.
- Separate travelers heading onto I-395 North/I-495/I-95 North from Route 644 westbound by giving them their own lanes and reconstructing the original ramp connecting I-95 North with the Outer Loop. The new ramp allowing these maneuvers opened on April 21, 2007. The ramp to I-395 now joins the main northbound lanes to the north of the previous merge after passing under the Outer Loop; the advantage of this design is that it eliminates the need for traffic taking this route to merge left onto I-395 at the same spot where traffic exiting I-95 onto the flyover ramp to the Inner Loop is required to move right. On the same date that this new ramp opened, the northbound lanes of I-395 were shifted slightly to the right (east) onto a new overpass over the Inner Loop, eliminating a sharp left-right movement over a potholed stretch of pavement that had existed for several years during the construction.
- Separate travelers from I-495 and I-395 South heading onto Route 644 by giving their own lanes, completed in mid-2007. The two-lane ramp from the Outer Loop (I-495 East) to I-95 South opened on December 15, 2006. Workers planned to open the ramp on December 6, but between December 6 and 15, the 5:00-9:00 temperature was below 45 °F (about 7 °C), preventing the lane markings from sticking. The original ramp from the Outer Loop to I-95 South was temporarily closed when this new ramp opened to allow for sound wall work. The old ramp reopened in late May 2007 and is signed to carry traffic from the Outer Loop to westbound Route 644 (Old Keene Mill Road). Signs direct Outer Loop traffic heading to eastbound Route 644 (Franconia Road) to use the new ramp opened in 2006. The remaining lanes on the ramps to Route 644 from the Inner Loop and from southbound I-395 opened at the same time as the reopening of the original Outer Loop ramp (now signed as Exit 169B). Contrary to original indications, no barrier separates westbound and eastbound traffic; rather, the design is intended to eliminate the need for drivers to change lanes to reach the proper ramps for their destination.

Upon completion, The Washington Post noted: "The project began in 1994 with a budget of $241 million. By 2002, it had nearly tripled, to $676 million, and a federal audit found that the Virginia Department of Transportation had underestimated costs and mismanaged funds. As recently as [2005], the project was months behind schedule, and managers predicted that it would not be completed on time. But the Virginia Department of Transportation officials pressured the primary contractor, including issuing a formal default letter, and work was put back on schedule without adding costs."

The project was completed on time in July 2007. The new interchange has 50 ramps and bridges, is 24 lanes at its widest point, and has a capacity of 500,000 vehicles per day.

=== Phase 8 ===
Phase 8 involved the construction of ramps connecting Shirley Highway's reversible center carriageway (HOV lanes) to the Capital Beltway. It was originally planned to be part of the Springfield Interchange Project but, due to cost overruns, was moved to the future Capital Beltway widening project, which was to include HOV lanes on the Capital Beltway. Phase 8 was subsequently deferred when the Beltway widening was delayed. Phase 8 was eventually constructed as part of the I-495 Express Lanes (high-occupancy/toll lanes) project and the Phase 8 ramps opened to traffic on November 17, 2012.

=== Other improvements ===
To aid commuters during construction, the Virginia Department of Transportation added 5,000 park-and-ride spaces, created a vanpool program, increased safety patrols to clear breakdowns, created a project web site, and distributed notifications of lane closures via an email list. The Virginia Department of Transportation also maintained a storefront office in the Springfield Mall.

== Earlier uses of the "Mixing Bowl" name ==
The term "Mixing Bowl" was previously used to refer to the interchange between I-395 and SR 27 in Arlington, near The Pentagon and Arlington National Cemetery; this interchange, like the Springfield one, contains a large number of lanes and ramps. However, most news reports on the Springfield Interchange refer to it as the "Mixing Bowl", and the term has become generally accepted. The other interchange is now known as the Pentagon road network.
