= Virginia State Route 644 (Fairfax County) =

Highway in Fairfax County, Virginia

State Route 644
- Old Keene Mill Road; Franconia Road

Route information
- Maintained by VDOT
- Length: 11.81 mi (19.01 km)

Major junctions
- West end: SR 286 in Burke
- SR 643 in Burke; SR 640 in Burke; SR 638 in West Springfield; SR 789 in Springfield; I-95 in Springfield; SR 635 in Franconia; SR 613 in Franconia
- East end: SR 611 in Rose Hill

Location
- Country: United States
- State: Virginia

Highway system
- Virginia Routes; Interstate; US; Primary; Secondary; Byways; History; HOT lanes

State Route 644 (SR 644) in Fairfax County, Virginia, United States, is an 11.81-mile (19.01 km) secondary state highway officially named Old Keene Mill Road west of Interstate 95 and Franconia Road to the east. While only a secondary state highway, it serves as a major thoroughfare through southern Fairfax County, acting as the main street through Springfield and Franconia, as well as serving Burke, West Springfield, and Rose Hill and connecting them towards Alexandria and Huntington near the Potomac River.

== Route description ==
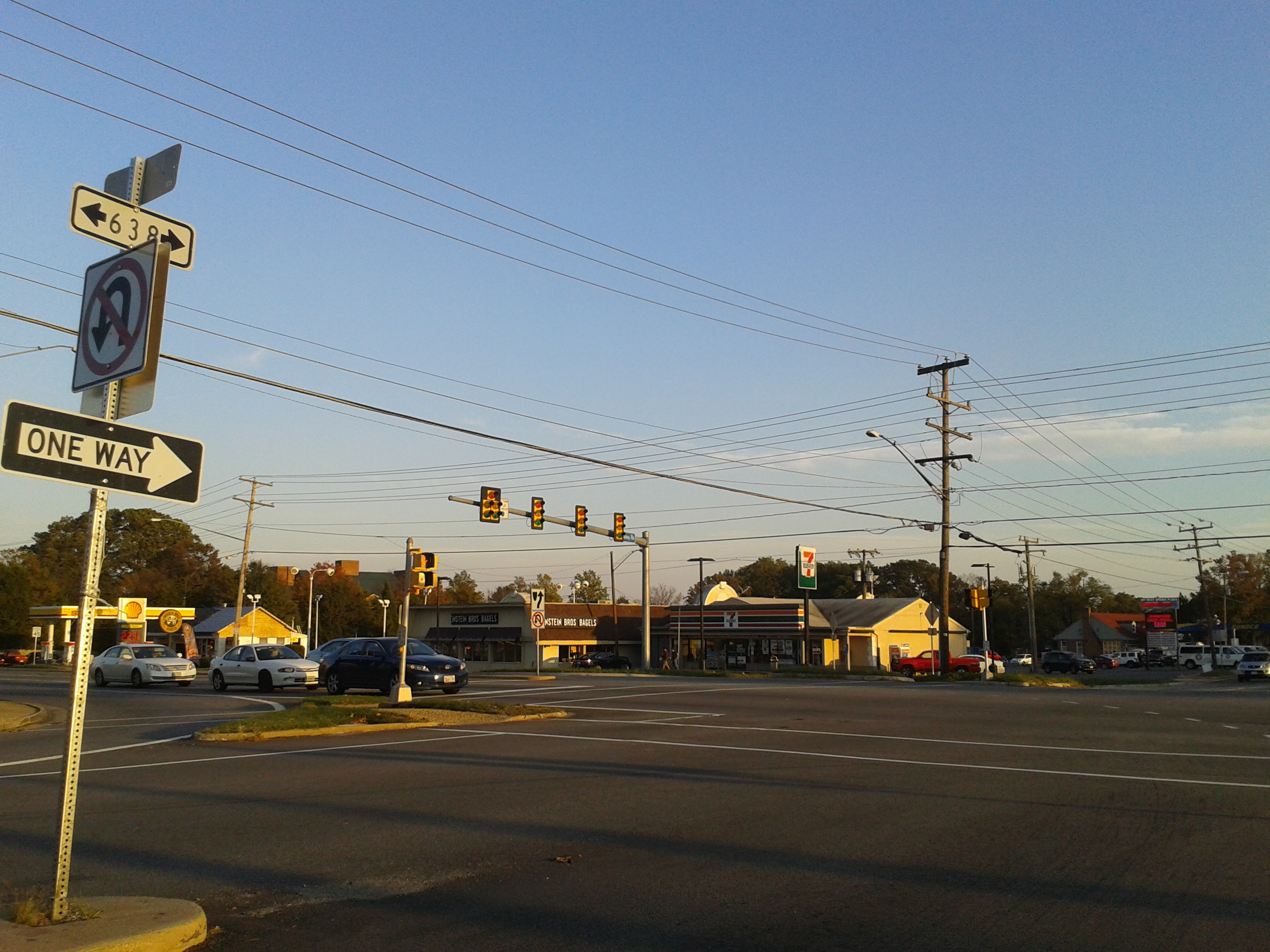
Intersection of Old Keene Mill Road and Rolling Road in West Springfield

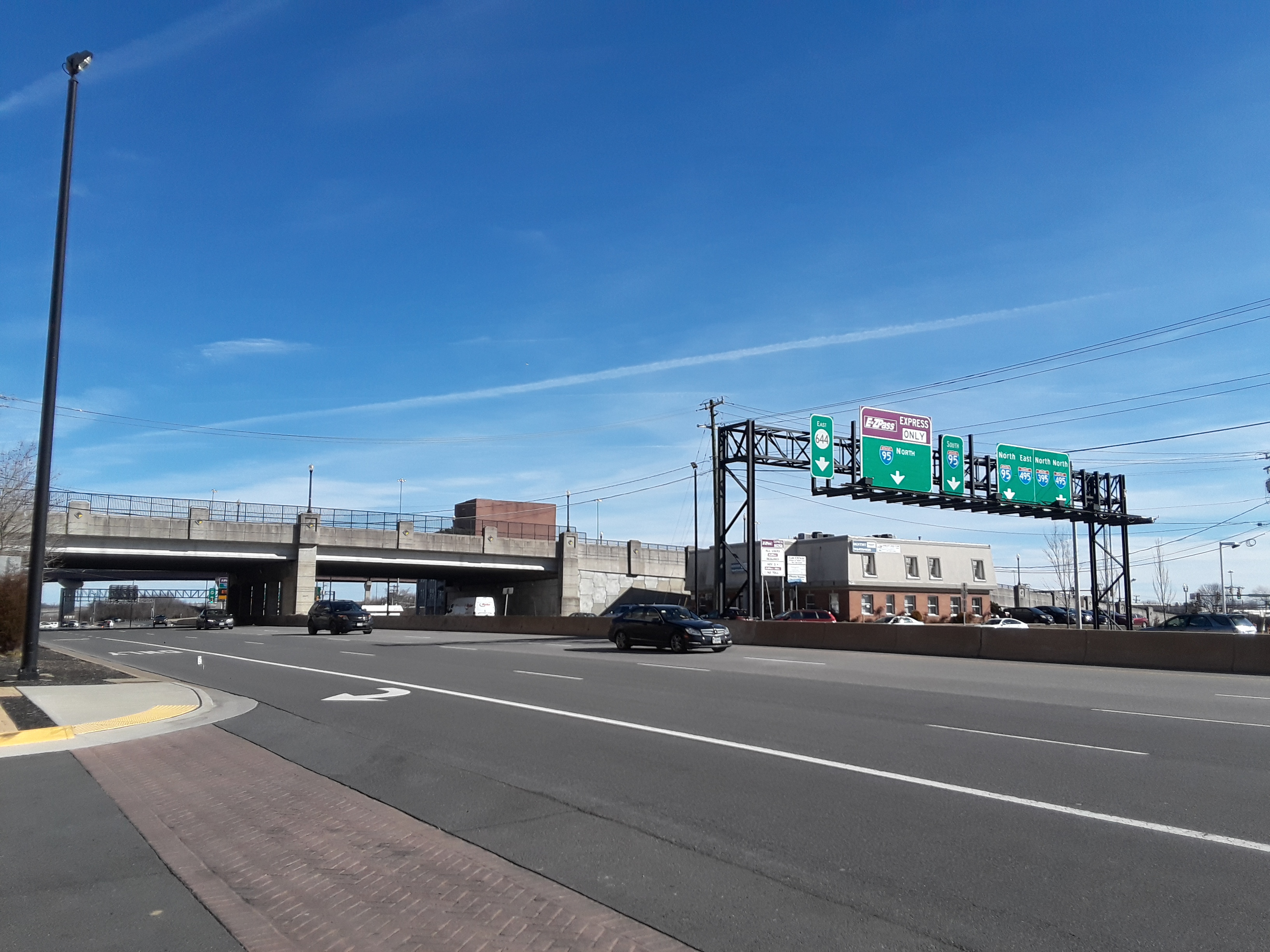
Old Keene Mill Road looking east towards the I-95 interchange in Springfield

SR 644, signed as Old Keene Mill Road, begins at SR 286 (Fairfax County Parkway) in Burke as a two-lane road and heads northeast. The road then crosses SR 643 (Lee Chapel Road), at where it becomes a four-lane divided road, and then SR 640 (Sydenstricker Road), which spurs off southeast. SR644 then crosses Pohick Creek and enters West Springfield where it intersects with SR 638 (Rolling Road). The road continues east and eventually crosses Accotink Creek and enters Springfield. In Springfield, SR 644 widens to six lanes and has a short 0.8-mile (1.3 km) controlled-access segment—completed during the Springfield Interchange project in 2001—which crosses I-95, where Old Keene Mill Road transitions to Franconia Road, and passes north of Springfield Town Center where it forms an interchange with SR 789 (Commerce Street), Loisdale Road, and Frontier Drive.

After passing through the interchanges, SR 644 continues east through Springfield then crosses over the Washington Metro Blue Line and RF&P Subdivision into Franconia, acting as the main thoroughfare through it. In Franconia, the road intersects Beulah Street and then South Van Dorn Street, which are both signed as SR 613. After crossing South Van Dorn Street, SR 644 enters Rose Hill and narrows to four lanes and then down to two at the center of the CDP. SR 644 continues east then terminates at SR 611 (Telegraph Road) near Huntington.

== History ==
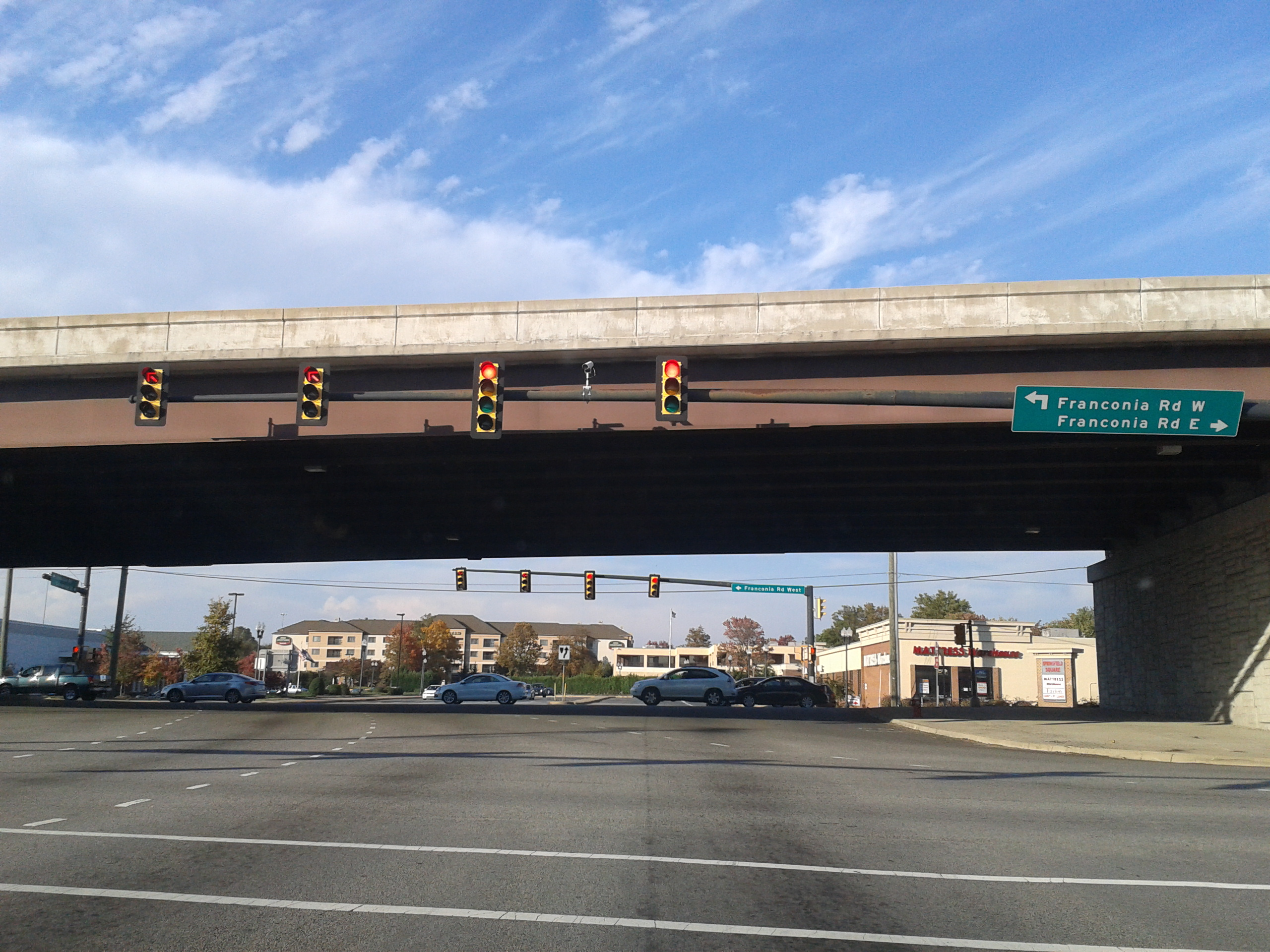
Franconia Road overpass/embankment over Loisdale Road and Commerce Street north of Springfield Town Center, completed in November 2001

Franconia Road once served as a rolling road for transporting tobacco to the port in Alexandra.

In March 1999, the I-95/SR 644 interchange began reconstruction in 1999 with completion in November 2001, improving access to Springfield. This was part of the 1999–2007 Springfield Interchange reconstruction project which improved the I-95/I-395/I-495 corridors in the area. Alongside improving the interchange with I-95, another new interchange was constructed at Commerce Street (SR 789), Loisdale Road, and Frontier Drive, improving access to the Springfield Mall (now called Springfield Town Center).

== Major intersections ==
The entire route is in Fairfax County.

Location	mi	km	Destinations	Notes
Burke	0.00	0.00	SR 286 (Fairfax County Parkway)	Western terminus of SR 644
Burke	0.91	1.46	SR 643 (Lee Chapel Road)	
Burke	1.00	1.61	Torrence Road	
Burke	1.32	2.12	SR 640 (Sydenstricker Road)	
Burke	1.41	2.27	Shiplett Boulevard	
Burke	1.62	2.61	Rolling Valley Park and Ride	
Burke	2.03	3.27	Field Master Drive	
Burke	2.40	3.86	Huntsman Boulevard	
Burke–West Springfield line	2.57– 2.60	4.14– 4.18	Bridge over Pohick Creek	
West Springfield	2.70	4.35	Hillside Road	
West Springfield	2.94	4.73	Bauer Drive; Greeley Boulevard	
West Springfield	3.35	5.39	SR 638 (Rolling Road)	
West Springfield	3.58	5.76	Carrleigh Parkway	
West Springfield	4.40	7.08	Greeley Boulevard	
West Springfield	4.94	7.95	Tiverton Drive; Hunter Village Drive	
West Springfield–Springfield line	5.10– 5.13	8.21– 8.26	Bridge over Accotink Creek	
Springfield	5.61	9.03	Hanover Avenue; Westmore Drive	
Springfield	5.80	9.33	SR 789 (Commerce Street)	
Springfield	5.91	9.51	Spring Road	
Springfield	6.02	9.69	Bland Street	Westbound RIRO; access to Amherst Avenue
Springfield	6.08	9.78	Springfield Boulevard	Eastbound connection; access to Amherst Avenue
Springfield	6.10– 6.12	9.82– 9.85	Amherst Avenue bridge	
Springfield	6.12– 6.19	9.85– 9.96	Backlick Road	RIROs; no access from westbound SR 644
Springfield	6.19– 6.48	9.96– 10.43	I-95	Interchange; northbound and southbound I-95 entrances accessed from westbound frontage road SR 644 changes name from Old Keene Road to Franconia Road
Springfield	6.48– 7.04	10.43– 11.33	Franconia Road frontage roads Commerce Street; Loisdale Road; Frontier Drive	Interchange
Springfield	7.04	11.33	Elder Avenue	
Springfield	7.31	11.76	Thomas Avenue	
Springfield	7.59	12.21	Willowfield Way; Seatrend Way	
Springfield–Franconia line	7.69– 7.72	12.38– 12.42	Bridge over Washington Metro Blue Line and RF&P Subdivision	
Franconia	7.73	12.44	SR 635 (Fleet Drive)	
Franconia	8.03	12.92	Franconia Forest Lane; Grovedale Drive	
Franconia	8.30	13.36	SR 613 (Beulah Street)	
Franconia–Rose Hill line	8.85	14.24	SR 613 (South Van Dorn Street)	
Rose Hill	9.03	14.53	Edison High School	
Rose Hill	9.69	15.59	Rose Hill Drive	
Rose Hill	11.81	19.01	SR 611 (Telegraph Road)	Eastern terminus of SR 644
1.000 mi = 1.609 km; 1.000 km = 0.621 mi: Route transition
