= Interstate 95 in Virginia =

Interstate Highway in Virginia

Interstate 95
- I-95 highlighted in red

Route information
- Maintained by VDOT
- Length: 178.73 mi (287.64 km)
- Existed: 1957–present
- NHS: Entire route

Major junctions
- South end: I-95 at the North Carolina state line near Skippers
- US 58 in Emporia; I-295 near Petersburg; I-85 / US 460 in Petersburg; SR 150 / SR 895 Toll in Bensley; US 250 in Richmond; US 1 / US 301 in Richmond; I-64 / I-195 in Richmond; US 17 near Fredericksburg; I-395 / I-495 in Springfield; US 1 in Alexandria
- North end: I-95 / I-495 at the District line in Alexandria

Location
- Country: United States
- State: Virginia
- Counties: Greensville, City of Emporia, Sussex, Prince George, City of Petersburg, City of Colonial Heights, Chesterfield, City of Richmond, Henrico, Hanover, Caroline, Spotsylvania, City of Fredericksburg, Stafford, Prince William, Fairfax, City of Alexandria

Highway system
- Interstate Highway System; Main; Auxiliary; Suffixed; Business; Future; Virginia Routes; Interstate; US; Primary; Secondary; Byways; History; HOT lanes
← SR 94	→ SR 96

Interstate 95 (I-95) runs 179 miles (288 km) within the commonwealth of Virginia between its borders with North Carolina and Maryland. I-95 meets the northern terminus of I-85 in Petersburg and is concurrent with I-64 for three miles (4.8 km) in Richmond. Although I-95 was originally planned as a highway through Washington, D.C. (following the route of what is now I-395), it was rerouted along the eastern portion of the Capital Beltway concurrent with I-495. From Petersburg to Richmond, I-95 utilized most of the Richmond–Petersburg Turnpike, a former toll road (the south end of the toll road was on I-85). In addition to Richmond, the route also runs through the medium-sized cities of Emporia, Petersburg, Colonial Heights, Fredericksburg, and Alexandria.

It enters the Capital Beltway at the Springfield Interchange, also known as the Mixing Bowl. I-95 continues over the Potomac River on the Woodrow Wilson Bridge into Washington, D.C. (for 0.11 miles [0.18 km] on the bridge) and then into Maryland on the Capital Beltway.

The route between Fredericksburg and Springfield is consistently one of the most congested routes of highway in the US, particularly during holidays and rush hours. The causes for this congestion are lack of alternative routes, fewer lanes than needed, and the spread-out suburbs of the Washington, D.C. area. To solve this problem, the Virginia Department of Transportation (VDOT) started a project to widen I-95 to six lanes between the cities, as well as adding express lanes and new offramps to U.S. Route 17 (US 17) and State Route 3 (SR 3) through Fredericksburg. The project was started in 2018 and was completed on December 7, 2023.

== Route description ==
=== North Carolina state line to Petersburg ===
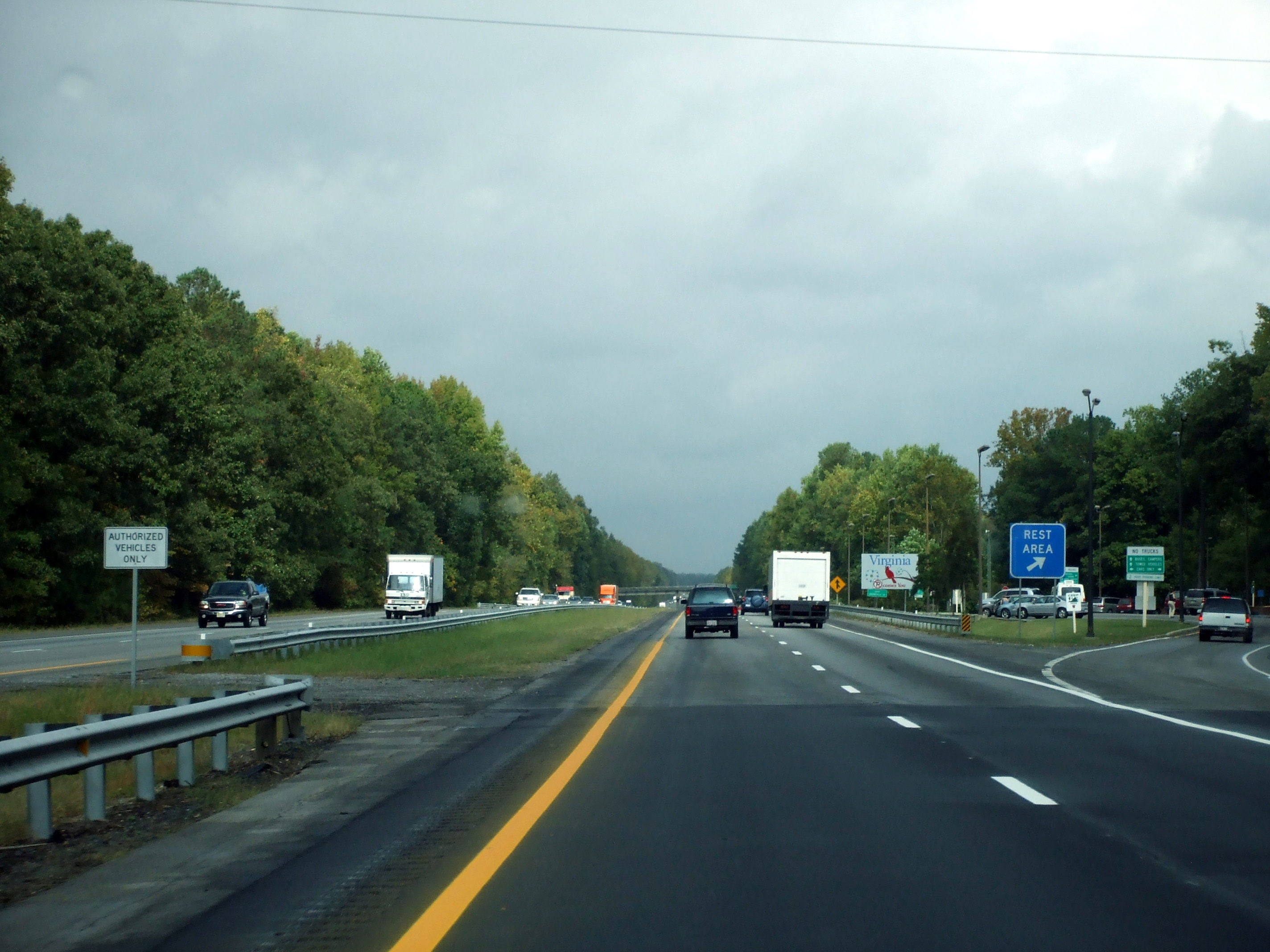
I-95 northbound entering Virginia from North Carolina in Greensville County

I-95 continues the pattern of being a four-lane highway from North Carolina. The northbound welcome center forbids trucks, but truck stops at the first two interchanges provides a substitute place for truckers to stay before reaching Emporia. In Emporia, the freeway has an interchange with US 58. North of here, I-95 and US 301 are often intertwined with each other as they encounter interchanges with Virginia Secondary State Routes. In the Owens–Stony Creek area in Sussex County, the road not only runs parallel to US 301 but shares bridges with I-95, many of which have access to US 301 from connecting roads. This pattern ends at exit 33 at the corner of a truck stop and travel center. Crossing the Sussex–Prince George county line, the first site along I-95 is another rest area that also serves as the Petersburg Area Tourist Information Center. The road makes a slight northeast turn between Carson and Templeton, then turns straight north again before approaching the south end of I-295 just before crossing the southern border of the city of Petersburg at exit 47. A series of frontage roads connect the interchanges with US 460, US 301 and the northern terminus of I-85. Immediately after the interchange with I-85, remnants of the former toll booths for the Richmond–Petersburg Turnpike can be found. Also, the I-95/I-85 interchange was formerly marked with signs directing southbound travelers to the long-distance cities of Miami, Florida, and Atlanta, Georgia, respectively.

=== Petersburg to Richmond ===
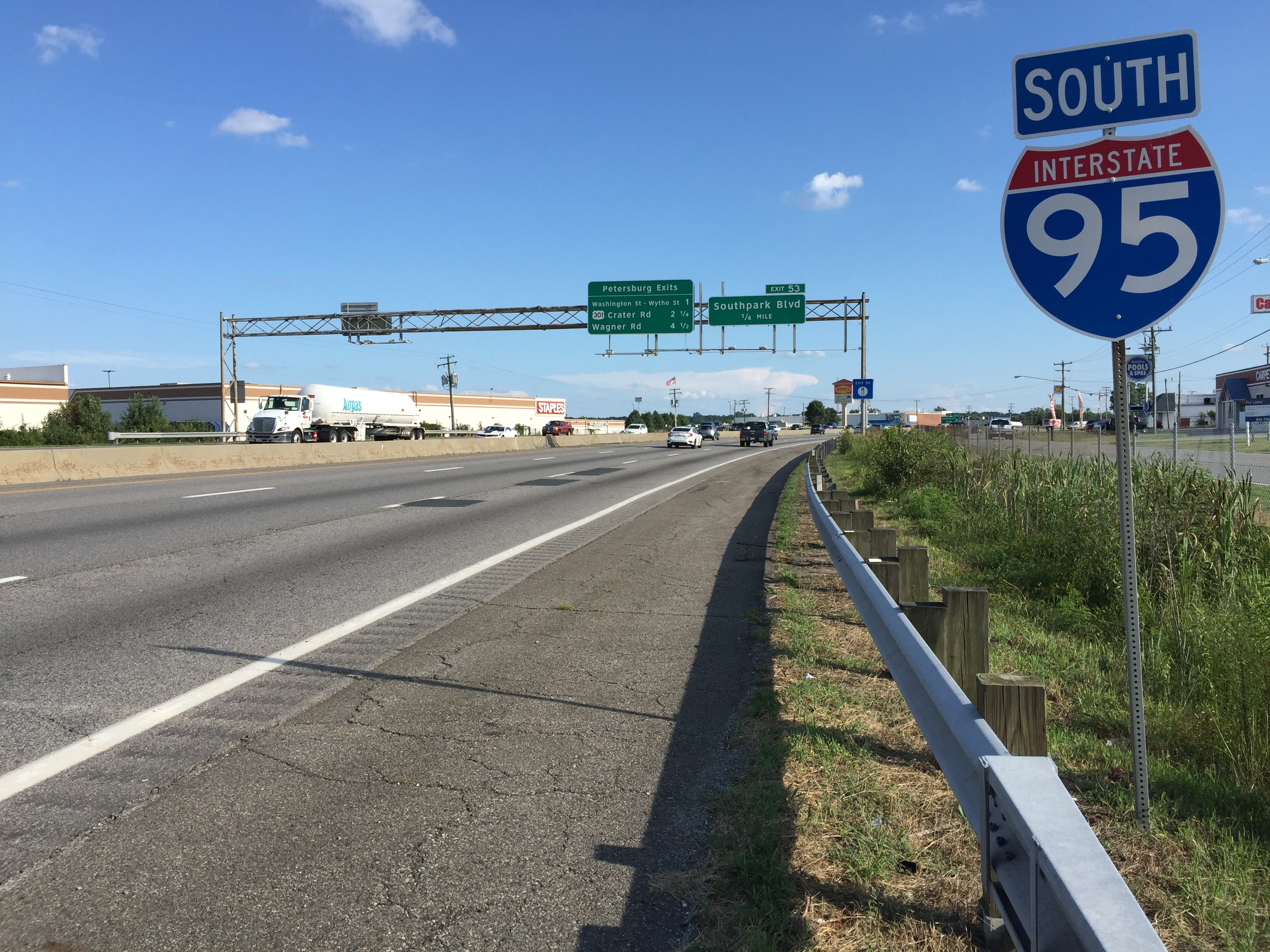
View of I-95 southbound past SR 144 in Colonial Heights

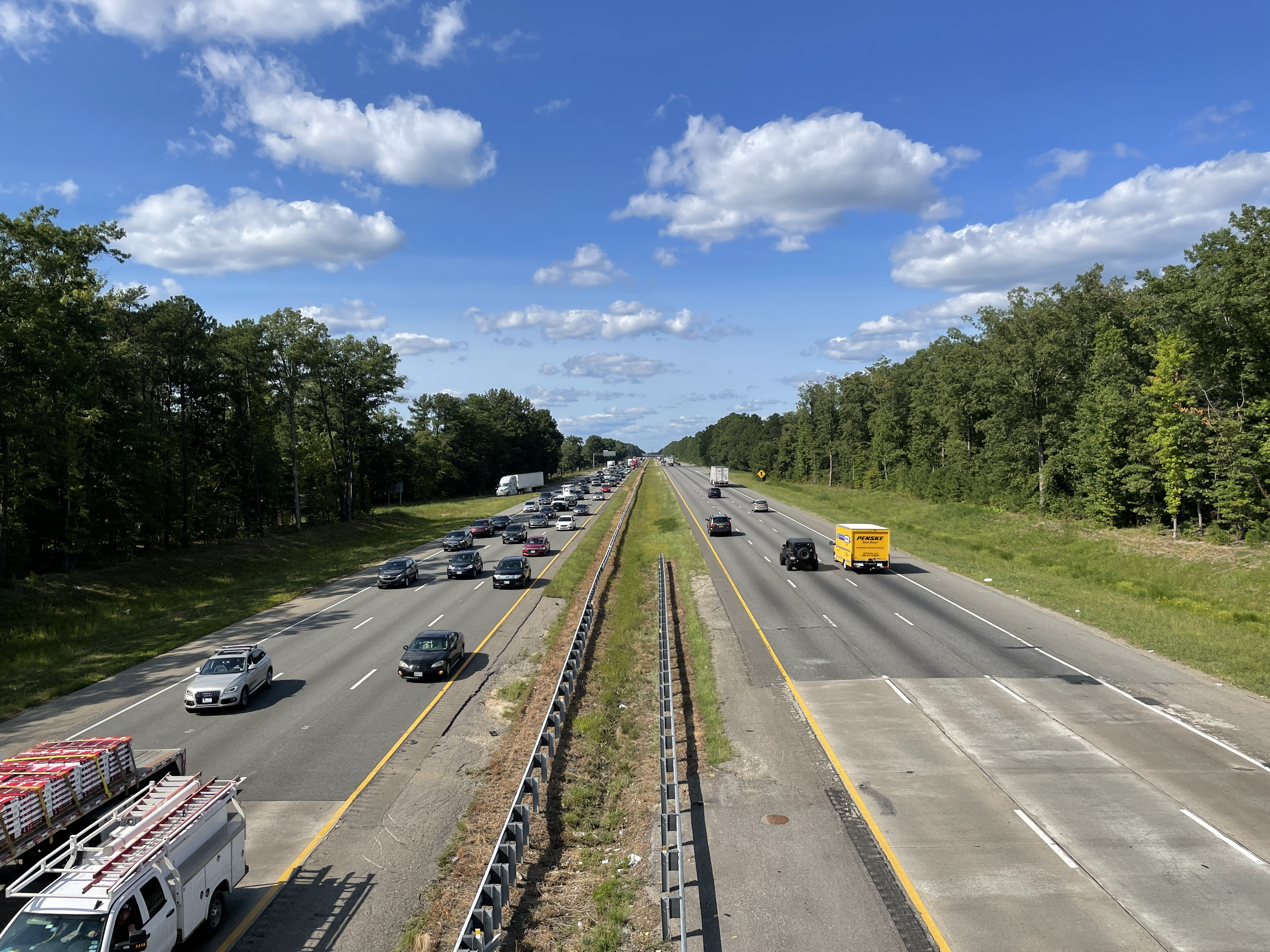
I-95 northbound at the SR 802 interchange in Hanover County

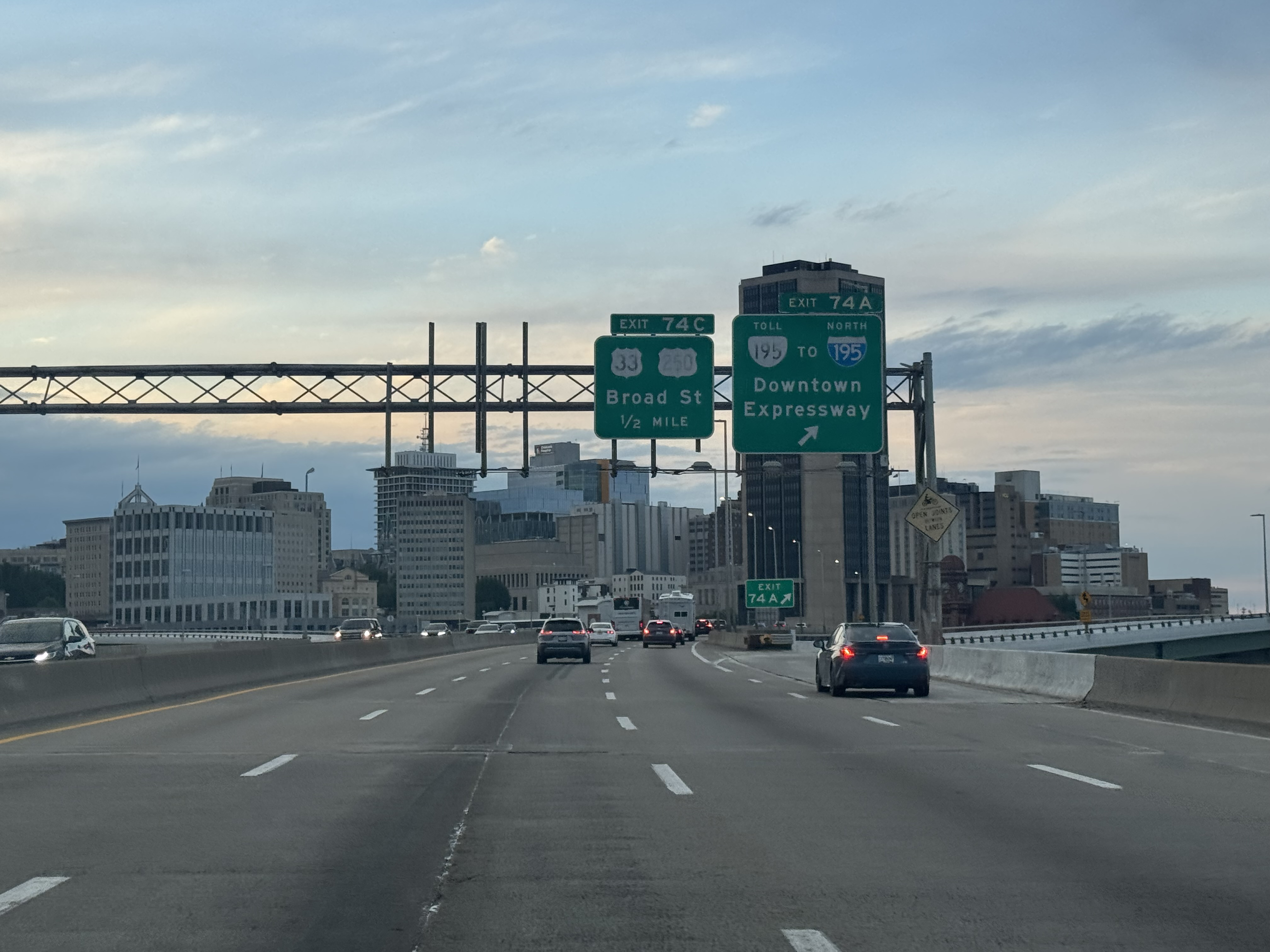
Interstate 95 interchange with Route 195 in Richmond, VA

North of Petersburg, I-95 crosses the Appomattox River and enters the city of Colonial Heights and then Chesterfield County. An extraordinarily high Vietnam Veterans Memorial Bridge carries SR 895 (Pocahontas Parkway) over I-95 and the James River just south of the Richmond city limits. A CSX Transportation railroad line runs parallel to the northbound lane in the vicinity of the Port of Richmond, and the Commerce Road Industrial Area, a region that includes a Philip Morris USA office and an old bridge manufacturing plant. As I-95 itself crosses the James River, Richmond Main Street Station can be seen on the north bank, and the road winds around the station itself. The first interchange after it crosses the James River is the tolled SR 195 freeway and from there the road winds toward the concurrency with I-64. I-64/I-95 curves to the northwest to cross under US 1/US 301, only to turn back north briefly, and curve northwest again, as it approaches SR 161. This pattern ends when I-64 turns west at the same interchange as the northern terminus of I-195. From here I-95 curves back to the northeast and has two interchanges with US 1, and later US 301 separately, the latter of which has separate carriageways on both side of I-95. Another interchange with I-295 exists in Glen Allen. However, I-295 does not terminate there, and the south-to-eastbound and west-to-northbound offramps between the two can be accessed in the medians of both roads.

=== Central Virginia to Washington, D.C. ===
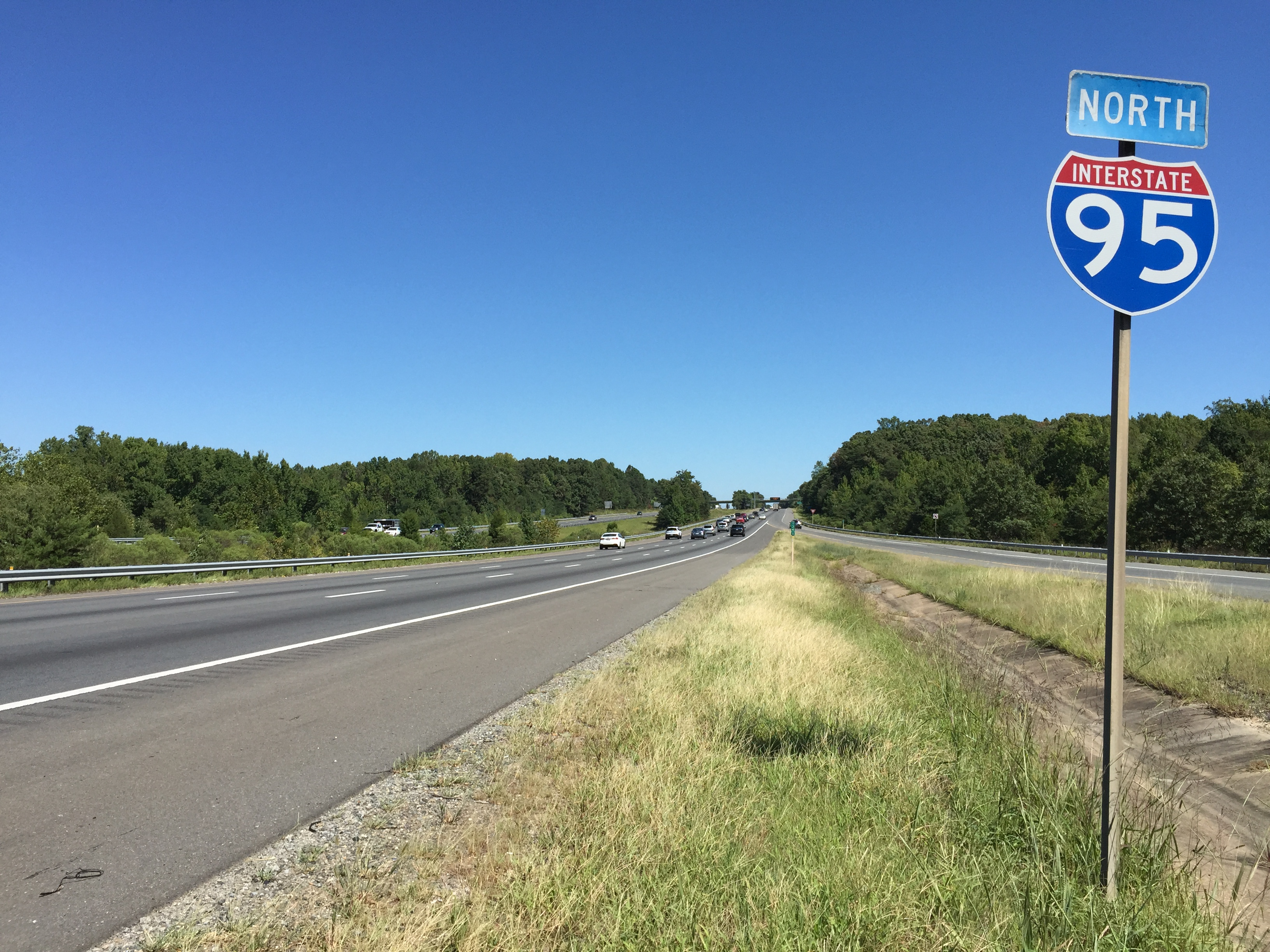
View north along I-95 north of US 17 in Stafford County

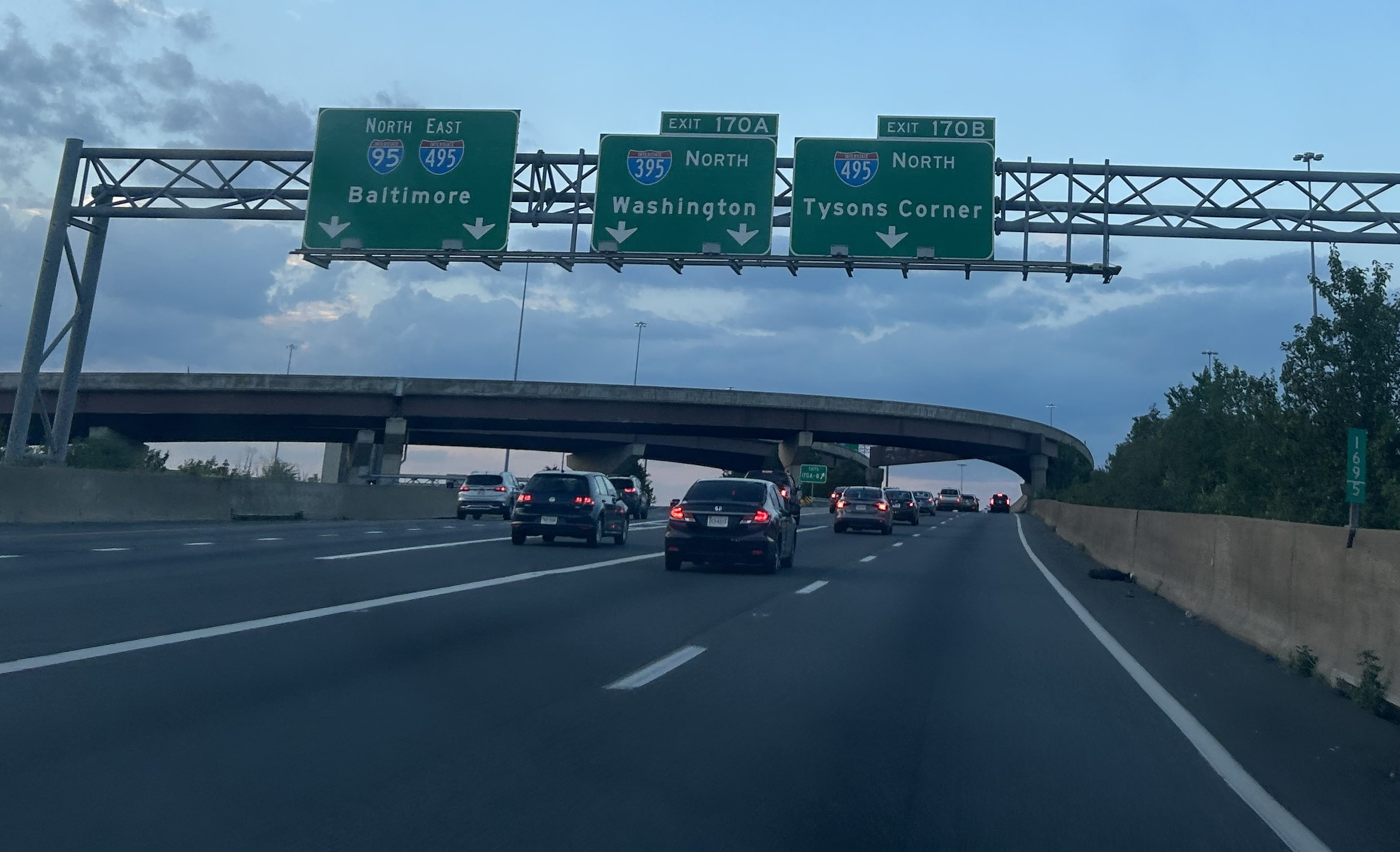
Northbound I-95 at the Springfield Interchange

Throughout much of central Virginia, I-95 climbs a series of hills and contains wide tree-lined medians. Near Doswell, the SR 30 interchange provides access to the Kings Dominion amusement park, with signs for the amusement park blended in with standard destination signs. US 17 overlaps I-95 from Massaponax at exit 126 north to Falmouth at exit 133 as the highway passes west of the city of Fredericksburg. The bidirectional high-occupancy toll lane (HOT lane) begins at the northern US 17 interchange and runs through the center of I-95 through most of the rest of its journey toward Washington, D.C. At exit 143 in Aquia, the northbound off- and onramps connect directly to US 1, even though the interchange is specifically for SR 610. Crossing over the Chopawamsic Creek takes I-95 through Marine Corps Base Quantico, which includes restrictive interchanges.

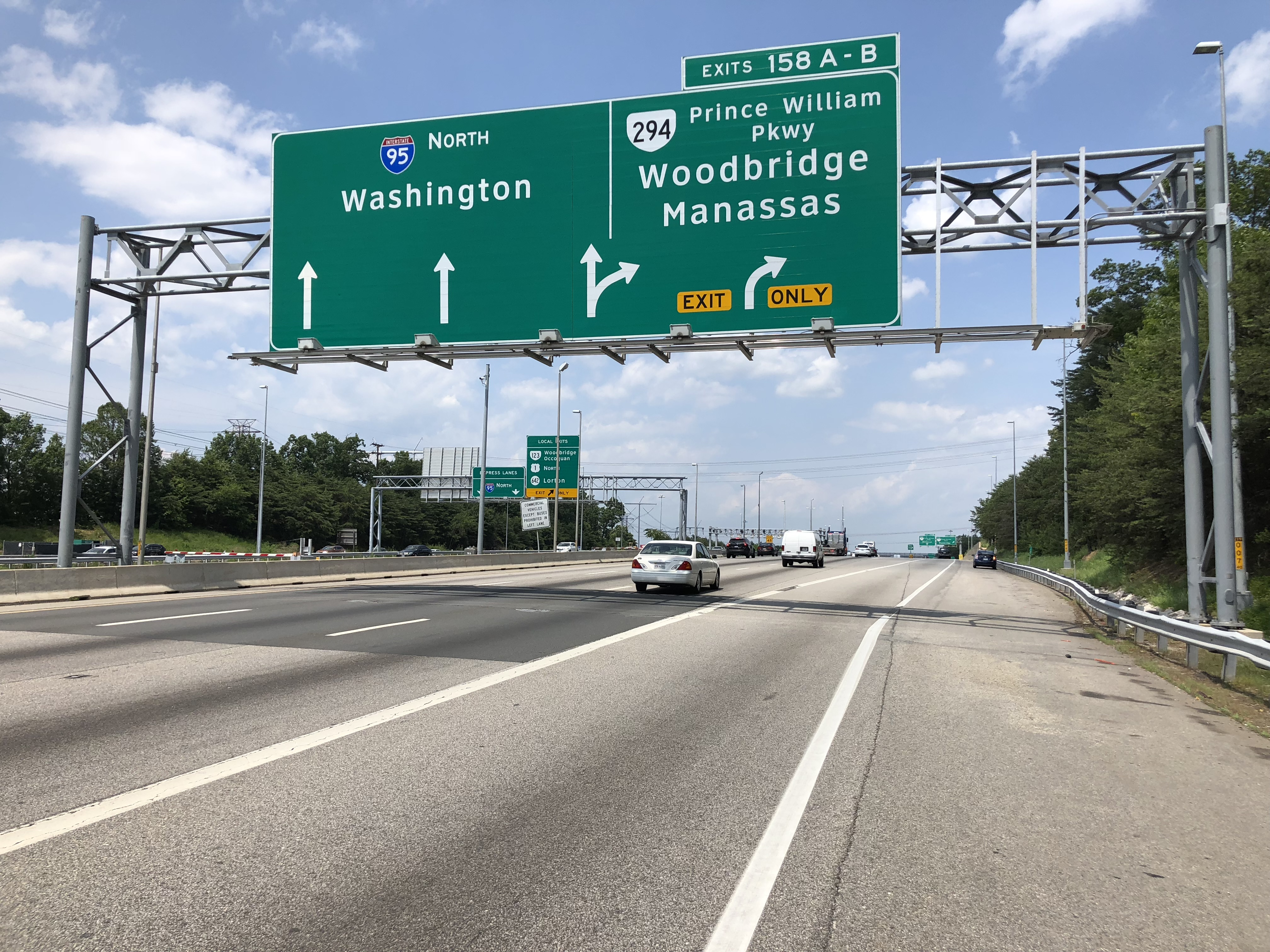
I-95 northbound at the SR 294 exit near Woodbridge

Further north in Prince William County, there are four rest areas; two for trucks in Dumfries and two for cars in Dale City. The truck rest areas, with weigh stations, are near exit 152. The car rest areas have uniquely positioned entrance and exit ramps. The southbound car rest area, near exit 156, is accessible only from the southbound collector–distributor road. In Lorton, a scissor interchange exists with US 1 and, shortly after this, Lorton station serving Amtrak's Auto Train is located near exit 163. Due to public opposition of efforts to build I-95 through Washington, D.C. and College Park, Maryland, I-95 is diverted onto a concurrency with I-495 (Capital Beltway) at the Springfield Interchange, with the former alignment north of here becoming I-395. I-95/I-495 continue east through Franconia, over the Washington Metro's Blue Line and Rose Hill. At Huntington, I-95/I-495 run under the Washington Metro's Yellow Line and through Alexandria before crossing over the Potomac River on the Woodrow Wilson Bridge briefly into Washington, D.C. and then into Maryland.

=== HOV facilities ===
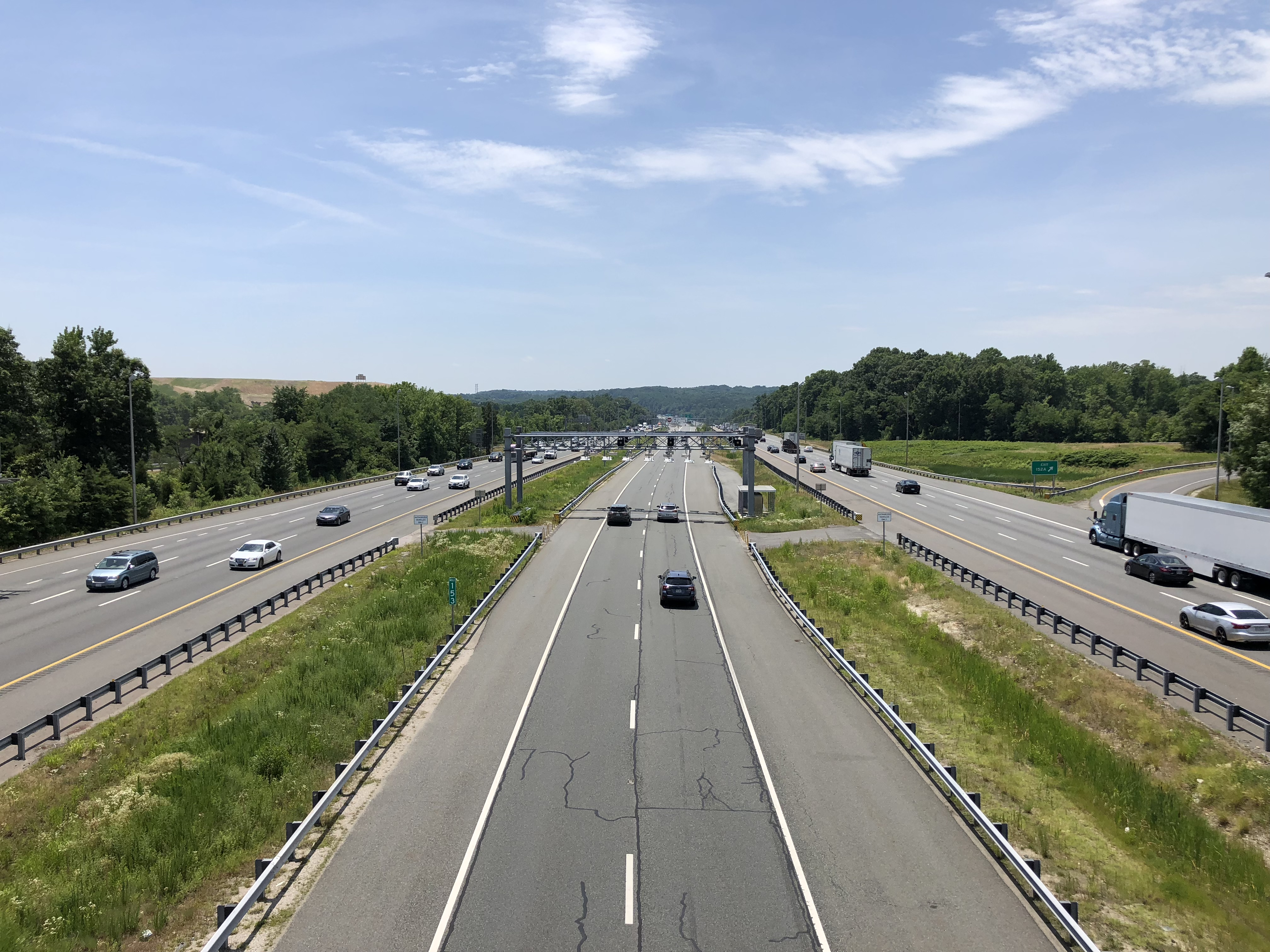
I-95 with reversible HOT lanes in northern Virginia

I-95 extends the twin-lane barrier-separated high-occupancy toll lanes (HOV lanes) that begin on I-395 at the 14th Street bridges in Washington. These lanes have been extended south several times, most recently to US 17 near Fredericksburg.

As part of the Quantico Creek bridge rebuilding project, a three-lane, 300-foot-long (91 m) bridge was constructed in the median just south of the old southern HOV terminus for use when the HOV facilities were extended. It was previously used as a detour bridge and retained its lane striping from such use.

In December 2014, this bridge became part of the Southern HOV/HOT lane extension project that now runs to just north of Garrisonville Road (exit 143) in Stafford.

The new I-95 HOV/HOT lanes project created approximately 29 miles (47 km) of HOV/HOT lanes on I-95 from Garrisonville Road in Stafford County to the vicinity of Edsall Road on I-395 in Fairfax County.

In July 2016, VDOT began construction of an additional one-mile (1.6 km) extension of the HOV/HOT lanes on I-95 south of Garrisonville Road in Stafford County. This addition opened in November 2017. On August 17, 2023, the HOV/HOT lanes were extended south from Garrisonville Road to US 17 near Fredericksburg; at the time, intermediate exits along the extension were not open. The intermediate exits opened on December 7, 2023.

=== Welcome centers, rest areas, and weigh stations ===
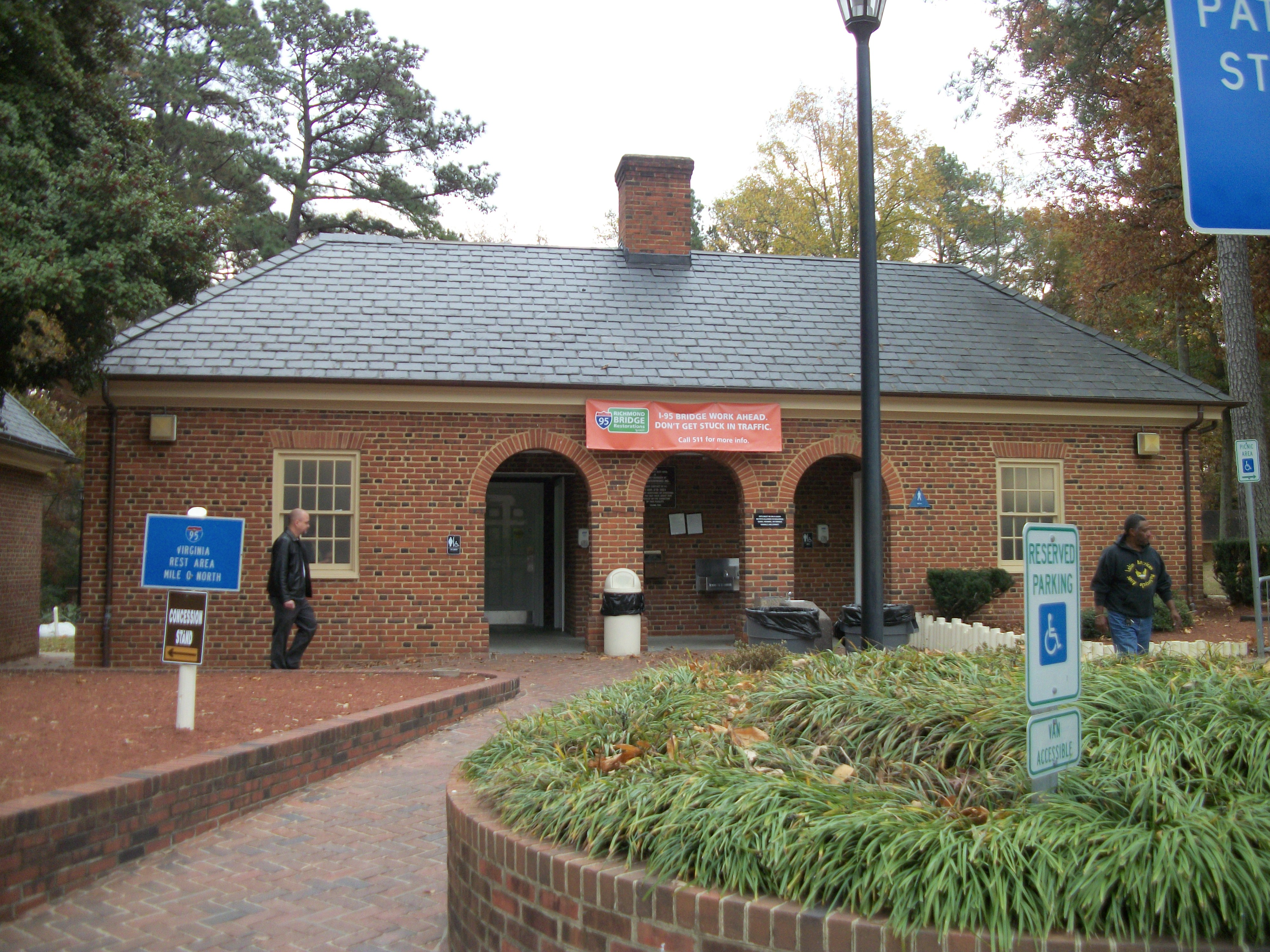
Virginia Welcome Center and rest area located northbound past the North Carolina state line

- Northbound Virginia Welcome Center: Milepost 1, north of the North Carolina state line
- Northbound Petersburg Welcome Center: Milepost 35 between exits 33 and 37
- Carson Weigh Stations: Milepost 40 between exits 37 and 41
- Ladysmith Rest Areas: Milepost 108 between exits 104 and 110
- Southbound Fredericksburg Rest Area: Milepost 132 between exits 130 and 133
- Dumfries Rest Area and Weigh Stations: Milepost 153 between exits 152 and 156
- Dale City Rest Areas: Milepost 155 between exits 152 and 156

=== Usage ===
In 2010, volume at Newington, northbound, from 6:00–9:00 am, is about 8,800 vehicles in the two HOV lanes and 18,300 vehicles in the three lanes with no restriction.

== History ==
The 35-mile (56 km) portion between Petersburg and Richmond opened on July 1, 1958. It was opened as a toll road, with a $0.70 toll to drive the entire distance of 35 miles (56 km).

The portion between Fredericksburg and Quantico opened December 18, 1964.

The 35-mile (56 km) portion between Fredericksburg and Ashland, Virginia opened on July 16, 1964. At the time, Route 1 between the same two cities was the most dangerous stretch of highway in Virginia, and the opening of I-95 was anticipated to reduce the number of vehicular accidents in the area.

== Auxiliary routes ==
=== Current ===
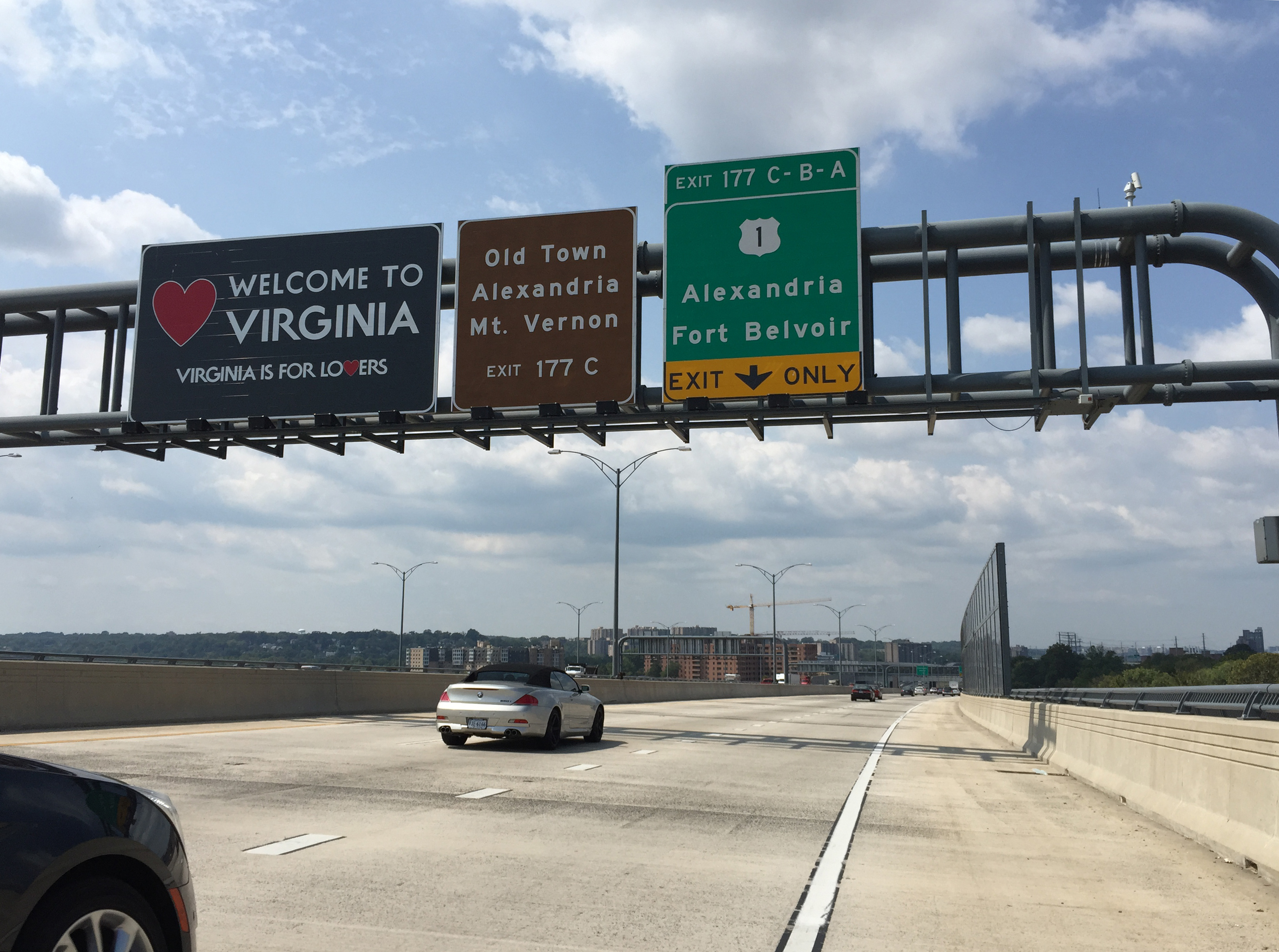
I-95/I-495 south coming off the Woodrow Wilson Bridge from Maryland

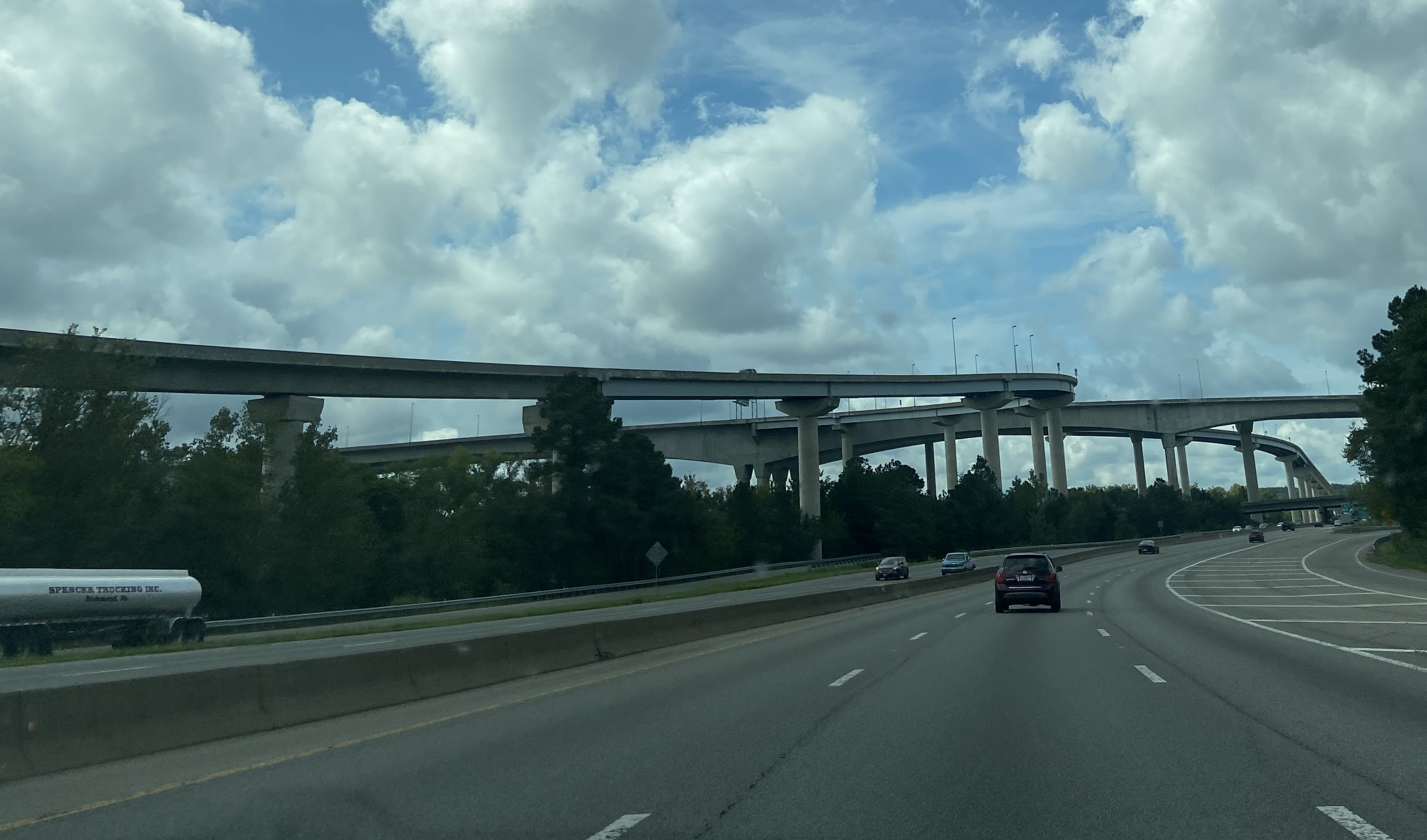
View south along I-95 north of SR 150 and SR 895 in Bensley

- I-195 is a short spur from north of Downtown Richmond south into downtown.
- I-295 is a bypass to the east of Richmond, from I-95 south of Petersburg, across I-64 east of Richmond and I-95 north of Richmond to I-64 west of Richmond.
- I-395 is a branch from Springfield north into Downtown D.C. It was part of I-95 until 1977.
- I-495 is the Capital Beltway, a full loop around Washington, D.C. Since 1977, I-95 has run along its eastern half.

=== Former ===
- I-95 Business was a former business loop of I-95 through Emporia between exits 8 and 12, running mostly along US 301.
- I-595 was a planned branch from I-395 south to Ronald Reagan Washington National Airport along US 1.
- I-795 was a planned number for present I-95 from I-295 south of Petersburg north to I-85 in Downtown Petersburg; I-95 would have bypassed Petersburg and Richmond to the east on I-295. The renumbering was never done because tolls were removed from the Richmond–Petersburg Turnpike section of I-95.
- SR 895 is the Pocahontas Parkway, a connection from I-95 south of Richmond east to I-295. It was not numbered as an interstate because the project opened as a toll road using federal funds, thus disqualifying it from Interstate status.

== Exit list ==
County	Location	mi	km	Exit	Destinations	Notes
Greensville		0.00	0.00		I-95 south – Rocky Mount	Continuation into North Carolina
Greensville	Skippers	4.13	6.65	4	SR 629 – Skippers	Diamond interchange opened in 1958
Greensville		8.25	13.28	8	US 301 – Emporia	Former south terminus of I-95 BL. Trumpet interchange originally a split interchange.
City of Emporia		11.00	17.70	11	US 58 – South Hill, Emporia, Norfolk	Signed as exits 11A (EAST) and 11B (WEST); cloverleaf interchange was originally to US 58 BUS before being upgraded to two exits (US 58 Business and US 58) in 1994.
Greensville		12.99	20.91	12	US 301 north	Northbound exit only; Former north terminus of I-95 BL and former temporary terminus of Interstate 95 until 1982. Former split interchange before becoming a straight exit.
Greensville		13.51	21.74	13	SR 614 – Emporia	Diamond interchange opened in 1982.
Sussex		17.30	27.84	17	US 301	
Sussex		20.25	32.59	20	SR 631 – Jarratt	Former SR 137; to SR 139
Sussex	Owens	24.29	39.09	24	SR 645	
Sussex	Stony Creek	30.92	49.76	31	SR 40 – Stony Creek, Waverly	
Sussex		33.37	53.70	33	SR 602	
Prince George	Carson	37.15	59.79	37	SR 623 – Carson	Former SR 141 west
Prince George	Templeton	40.88	65.79	41	US 301 / SR 35 / SR 156 – Courtland	
Prince George	Kingwood	45.42	73.10	45	US 301	
Prince George		46.53	74.88	46	I-295 north – Washington	Exit 1 (I-295 to I-95 north); to Richmond Int’l
City of Petersburg		47.74	76.83	47	SR 629 (Rives Rd)	
City of Petersburg		48.89	78.68	48	US 460 east (Wagner Rd)	Signed as exits 48A (EAST) and 48B (WEST); south end of the overlap with US 460; serves Southside Regional Medical Center
City of Petersburg		50.61– 51.06	81.45– 82.17	50	US 460 Bus. east (County Dr) to SR 109 / US 301 (Crater Rd) / Wythe St, Washington St – Fort Gregg-Adams	Northbound signed as "US 460 east to SR 109/US 301/Wythe St./Washington St."; southbound signed as "US 301/US 460 Bus." only; signed as exits 50A (US 460), 50B-C (US 301), and 50D (Wythe St./Washington St.) northbound
City of Petersburg		51.71	83.22	51	I-85 south / US 460 west – South Hill, Blackstone (NB) I-85 south / US 460 west – Durham (SB)	Northern end of the concurrency with US 460; Northern terminus of I-85; northbound signed as "South Hill/Blackstone"; southbound signed as "Durham"
City of Petersburg		52.14	83.91	52	Bank St	Northbound exit only
City of Petersburg		52.15	83.93	52	US 460 Bus. west (Washington St, Wythe St) – Petersburg National Battlefield, Historic Old Towne Petersburg	
Appomattox River		52.79	84.96	Appomattox River Bridge		
City of Colonial Heights		53.00	85.30	53	Southpark Blvd	
City of Colonial Heights		53.98	86.87	54	SR 144 (Temple Ave) to SR 36	
Chesterfield		57.91	93.20	58	SR 620 (Woods Edge Rd) / SR 746 (Ruffin Mill Rd)	Signed as exits 58A (EAST) and 58B (WEST) southbound
Chesterfield	Chester	60.81	97.86	61	SR 10 – Hopewell, Chester	Signed as exits 61A (EAST) and 61B (WEST)
Chesterfield	Chester	62.62	100.78	62	SR 288 north – Chesterfield TO Powhite Pkwy	Southern terminus of SR 288
Chesterfield	Chester–Bensley line	64.66	104.06	64	SR 613 (Willis Rd)	
Chesterfield	Bensley	67.43	108.52	67	SR 895 Toll east to I-295 SR 150 north (Chippenham Parkway) to US 60 west / US 360 west	Signed as exits 67A (EAST) and 67B (NORTH) northbound; no access from I-95 south to SR 895 east; southern terminus of SR 150; western terminus of SR 895; to Richmond Int’l
City of Richmond		69.35	111.61	69	SR 161 (Bells Rd)	Southern terminus of SR 161
City of Richmond		73.16	117.74	73	Maury St / Commerce Rd	
City of Richmond		73.61	118.46	James River Bridge		
City of Richmond		74.01	119.11	74A	SR 195 Toll (Downtown Expressway) to I-195 north / Powhite Pkwy)	Eastern terminus of SR 195
City of Richmond		74.30	119.57	74B	Franklin St	Southbound exit only
City of Richmond		74.63	120.11	74C	US 250 (Broad St) to US 33	No access from I-95 south to US 250 east
City of Richmond		75.55	121.59	75	I-64 east / 7th St – Williamsburg, Norfolk, Va Beach, Richmond Int’l	Southern end of the concurrency with I-64; Exit 190 (I-64)
City of Richmond		75.85	122.07	76A	US 1 / US 301 (Chamberlayne Ave)	Northbound exit and southbound entrance
City of Richmond		76.09	122.45	76B	US 1 / US 301 (Belvidere St)	No northbound exit
City of Richmond		78.06	125.63	78	SR 161 (Arthur Ashe Blvd)	
City of Richmond		78.84	126.88	79	I-64 west / I-195 south / TO Powhite Pkwy – Charlottesville	Northern end of the concurrency with I-64; Exit 187 ((I-64)
City of Richmond		79.91	128.60	80	SR 161 (Hermitage Rd / Lakeside Ave)	Northbound exit and southbound entrance
Henrico	Brook Hill	80.82	130.07	81	US 1 (Brook Rd)	Northbound exit and southbound entrance
Henrico		81.12	130.55	82	US 301 / SR 2 (Chamberlayne Ave)	Former northern terminus of Richmond–Petersburg Turnpike from 1994. Partial trumpet interchange.
Henrico	Yellow Tavern	82.94	133.48	83	SR 73 west (Parham Rd)	Signed as exits 83A (EAST) and 83B (WEST); Originally a trumpet interchange before being upgraded to a cloverleaf interchange in the late 1980s.
Henrico		84.41	135.84	84	I-295 to I-64 – Charlottesville, Williamsburg, Norfolk, Virginia Beach, Rocky Mount, NC, Richmond International Airport	Signed as exits 84A (south) and 84B (north); I-295 exit 43; Rocky Mount, NC signed northbound; Williamsburg and Virginia Beach signed southbound
Hanover	Ashland	87.30	140.50	86	SR 656 – Atlee, Elmont	Signed as exits 86A (east) and 86B (west); originally a diamond interchange before being upgraded into a cloverleaf interchange with fly-over ramp in 2004.
Hanover	Lewistown	89.09	143.38	89	SR 802 (Lewistown Road)	Originally a diamond interchange before northbound exit becoming extended in 2018.
Hanover	Ashland	91.74	147.64	92	SR 54 – Ashland, Hanover	Signed as exits 92A (east) and 92B (west) northbound; partial cloverleaf interchange was upgraded in 2017.
Hanover		97.75	157.31	98	SR 30 – Doswell, West Point, Kings Dominion	Southbound exit splits to separate ramp to Kings Dominion; partial cloverleaf interchange opened in 1973.
Caroline	Carmel Church	104.18	167.66	104	SR 207 to US 301 – Carmel Church, Bowling Green	Partial cloverleaf interchange initially opened in the 1960s, bridge was replaced in 1994.
Caroline	Ladysmith	110.30	177.51	110	SR 639 – Ladysmith	To former SR 229 west; diamond interchange.
Spotsylvania	Thornburg	118.26	190.32	118	SR 606 (Mudd Tavern Road) – Thornburg	Interchange was originally a partial cloverleaf interchange before being rebuilt in the late 2010s.
Spotsylvania		125.84	202.52	126	US 1 / US 17 south – Spotsylvania, Fredericksburg	Southern end of US 17 concurrency; signed as exits 126A (north) and 126B (south) northbound; diamond interchange with northbound loop.
City of Fredericksburg		129.54	208.47	130	SR 3 – Culpeper, Fredericksburg	Signed as exits 130A (east) and 130B (west); was a full cloverleaf interchange before removing one of the northbound entrances in the summer of 2018.
Rappahannock River		131.83	212.16	Rappahannock Falls Bridge		
Stafford		133.08	214.17	133	US 17 north / US 17 Bus. south – Warrenton, Falmouth, Fredericksburg	Northern end of US 17 concurrency; signed as exits 133A (US 17 Bus.) and 133B (north) southbound only; was a cloverleaf interchange before permanently closing one of the northbound "loops" in January 2023 as part of widening, primarily due to head-on collisions.
Stafford					I-95 Express north	South end of I-95 Express lanes
Stafford		135.61	218.24	136	SR 8900 (Centreport Parkway) to US 1 – Stafford Airport	Exit opened December 22, 2005
Stafford		139.83	225.03	140	SR 630 – Stafford	To former SR 212 east
Stafford		141.00	226.92		I-95 Express north	Northbound exit and southbound entrance
Stafford	Aquia	142.73	229.70	143A	SR 610 east / US 1 – Aquia	Signed as US 1 northbound and SR 610 southbound; former SR 213
Stafford	Aquia	142.73	229.70	143B	SR 610 west – Garrisonville	Former SR 213
Stafford		145.30	233.84		I-95 Express north	Northbound exit and southbound entrance
Prince William		147.65	237.62	148	Marine Corps Base Quantico	
Prince William	Triangle	149.97	241.35	150	SR 619 – Triangle, Quantico, Prince William Forest Park	Signed as exits 150A (east) and 150B (west) southbound; commercial vehicles to Marine Corps Base Quantico must use exit 148
Prince William		151.00	243.01		I-95 Express north	Northbound exit and southbound entrance
Prince William	Dumfries	152.36	245.20	152	SR 234 – Dumfries, Manassas	Signed as exits 152A (south) and 152B (north)
Prince William	Dale City	155.91	250.91	156	SR 784 – Dale City, Rippon Landing	Since 2012, signed as exits 156A (east) and 156B (west); northbound entrance includes direct entrance ramp from Opitz Boulevard, and direct exit ramp to I-95 Express lanes
Prince William		157.00	252.67		I-95 Express	No direct northbound exit
Prince William		158.13	254.49	158	SR 294 (Prince William Parkway) – Woodbridge, Manassas	Signed as exits 158A (east) and 158B (west)
Prince William		158.13	254.49		SR 294 (Prince William Parkway) – Manassas, Woodbridge	Southbound exit and northbound entrance for I-95 Express lanes; exit includes direct exit ramp to Horner Road Commuter Parking Lot
Prince William	Woodbridge	160.05	257.58	160	SR 123 – Occoquan, Lake Ridge, Woodbridge	Signed as exits 160A (south) and 160B (north) northbound; no access from I-95 south to SR 123 south
Prince William		160.05	257.58		SR 123 – Occoquan, Lake Ridge	Southbound exit and northbound entrance for I-95 Express lanes
Fairfax	Lorton	161.17	259.38	161	US 1 north – Fort Belvoir, Mount Vernon	Northbound exit and southbound entrance
Fairfax	Lorton	161.17	259.38	161	US 1 south – Woodbridge	Southbound exit and northbound entrance for I-95 Express lanes
Fairfax	Lorton	161.17	259.38	161	US 1 south – Woodbridge	Southbound left exit and northbound entrance
Fairfax	Lorton	163.66	263.39	163	SR 642 – Lorton	
Fairfax	Newington	165.56	266.44		I-95 Express north	Northbound exit only
Fairfax	Newington	166.00	267.15		Alban Road / Boudinot Drive	Southbound entrance only for I-95 Express lanes
Fairfax	Newington	166.80	268.44	166	SR 286 (Fairfax County Parkway) / Backlick Road (SR 617) / Fullerton Road / Heller Road – Newington, Fort Belvoir	Signed as exits 166A (south) and 166B (north); Heller Rd. not signed northbound; Backlick Rd./Fullerton Rd. not signed southbound
Fairfax	Newington	167.00	268.76		I-95 Express south	Southbound exit and northbound entrance
Fairfax	Newington	167.81	270.06	167	SR 617 south (Backlick Road) / Fullerton Road	Southbound exit only
Fairfax	Springfield	169.05	272.06	169A-B	SR 644 – Franconia, Springfield	No southbound exit; signed as exits 169A (east) and 169B (west)
Fairfax	Springfield	169.05	272.06		SR 289 (Franconia-Springfield Parkway)	I-95 Express lane interchange
Fairfax	Springfield	169.05	272.06		I-95 Express north	Northbound exit and southbound entrance
Fairfax	Springfield	169.05	272.06		SR 644 west – Springfield	Southbound exit and northbound entrance for I-95 Express lanes
Fairfax	Springfield	169.05– 171.01	272.06– 275.21	170A-B	I-395 north / I-495 north – Washington, Tysons Corner	Part of Springfield Interchange; northbound exit and southbound entrance; signed as exits 170A (I-395) and 170B (I-495); I-395 exits 1A-B
Fairfax	Springfield	169.05– 171.01	272.06– 275.21		I-395 Express north	I-95 Express lane interchange; part of Springfield Interchange
Fairfax	Springfield	169.05– 171.01	272.06– 275.21		I-495 north – Tysons Corner	I-95 Express lane interchange; part of Springfield Interchange
Fairfax	Springfield	169.05– 171.01	272.06– 275.21		I-95 Express south	Part of Springfield Interchange; north end of I-95 Express lanes
Fairfax	Springfield	169.05– 171.01	272.06– 275.21	170B	I-495 north – Tysons Corner	Southern end of I-495 concurrency; part of Springfield Interchange; southbound exit and northbound entrance
Fairfax	Franconia	171.97	276.76	173	SR 613 (Van Dorn Street) – Franconia	Formerly signed as exit 3 (following old Capital Beltway numbering)
Fairfax	Rose Hill	173.51	279.24	174	Eisenhower Avenue Connector – Alexandria	
Fairfax	Rose Hill	174.31	280.52	—	I-95 north / I-495 east (Thru Lanes) – Baltimore I-95 Local north / I-495 Local east – Alexandria	South end of Thru Lanes
Fairfax	Huntington	175.06	281.73	176A-B	SR 241 / SR 611 south (Telegraph Road / North Kings Highway) / to Eisenhower Avenue – Alexandria	Signed as exits 176A (south) and 176B (north); formerly signed as exit 2 (following old Capital Beltway numbering)
Fairfax	Huntington	176.27	283.68	—	Eisenhower Avenue	Southbound exit and northbound entrance for Thru Lanes only
City of Alexandria		176.57	284.16	177A-B	US 1 – Alexandria, Fort Belvoir	Signed as exits 177A (south) and 177B (north); formerly signed as exit 1 (following old Capital Beltway numbering); entrances include direct entrance ramps onto Thru Lanes; no access to northbound Thru Lanes from US 1 north
City of Alexandria		176.57	284.16	177C	Mount Vernon	Southbound exit only
Potomac River		177.64	285.88	Woodrow Wilson Bridge; VA–DC and DC–MD lines		
Potomac River		177.64	285.88		I-95 Local north / I-495 Local north (Capital Beltway) – Baltimore	Continuation beyond Virginia
1.000 mi = 1.609 km; 1.000 km = 0.621 mi: Concurrency terminus; Electronic toll collection; Incomplete access; Unopened

Interstate 95
Previous state: North Carolina	Virginia	Next state: District of Columbia
