= Elmont, Virginia =

Unincorporated community in Virginia, United States

Coordinates: 37°42′41″N 77°29′33″W

Elmont is an unincorporated community in Hanover County in the Central Region of the U.S. state of Virginia. It was located on the former Richmond, Fredericksburg and Potomac Railroad, now owned by CSX Transportation. Elmont was located on the old Washington Highway, and was served by an electric trolley car line between Richmond and Ashland.

Formerly consisting primarily of farmland, today Elmont is a community with many residents who commute to jobs in the metropolitan Richmond area.
