= Holmes Run Trail =

Coordinates: 38°49′04″N 77°07′26″W

- Length: 5 miles (8.0 km)
- Location: Alexandria, Virginia and Fairfax County, Virginia
- Trailheads: Cameron Run Regional Park, Lake Barcroft, Roundtree Park
- Use: cycling, pedestrians
- Surface: asphalt and stonedust

Holmes Run Trail Map
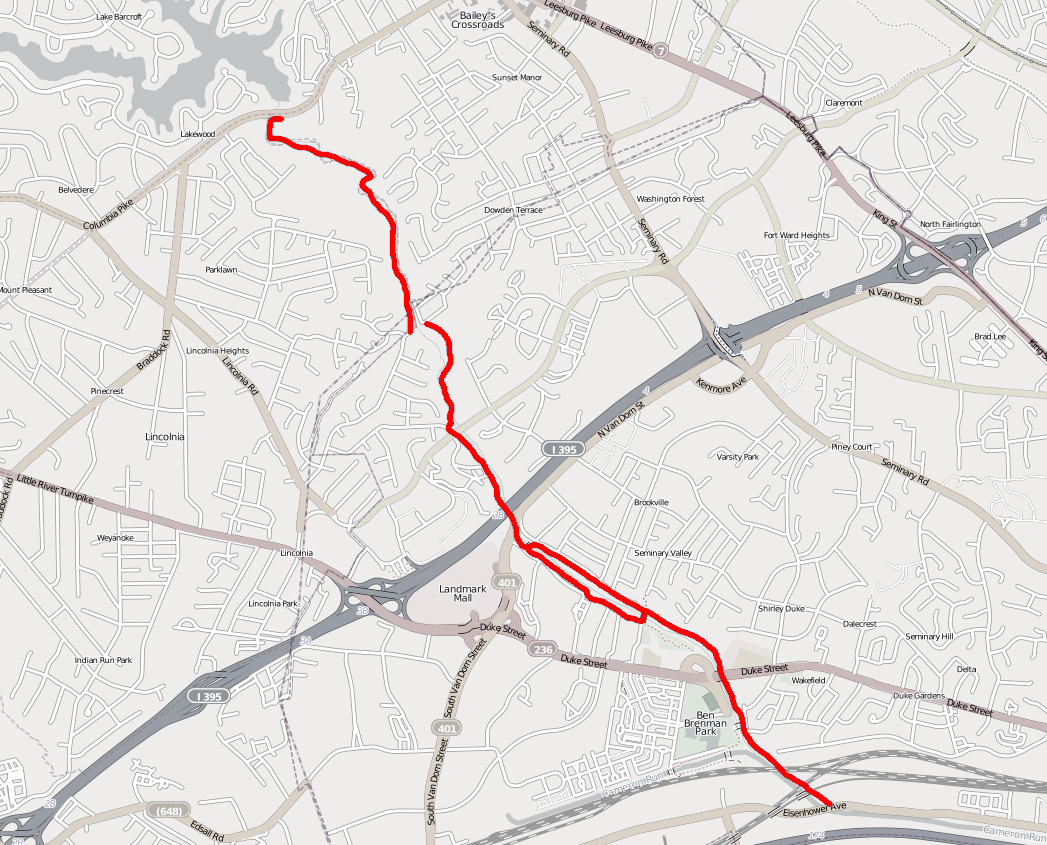
- Map of the southern section of the Holmes Run Trail

The Holmes Run Trail is a partially paved trail that travels through parks northwest along Holmes Run from Cameron Run in Alexandria, Virginia to Annandale Road (Virginia State Route 649) in Fairfax County, Virginia. The trail travels near the sides of the stream with multiple bridges, some of which are only about a foot higher than the water. The trail consists of two sections that are separated by Lake Barcroft near Columbia Pike (Virginia State Route 244) in Fairfax County.

The Alexandria portion of the trail is 2.6 miles (4.2 km) in length and travels northwest in Alexandria from Eisenhower Avenue at Cameron Run, next to Cameron Run Regional Park, to the Alexandria/Fairfax County boundary near the end of North Chambliss Street. The Fairfax County portion of the trail travels northwest between that boundary and Columbia Pike and is 1.2 miles (1.9 km) in length. A bridge over the Run in Alexandria that is located a short distance southeast of the boundary and Fairfax County's Glen Hills Park connects these two portions of the trail, which together comprise the trail's entire 3.8-mile-long (6.1 km) southern section. The northern section of the trail is 1.2 miles (1.9 km) in length and located entirely in Fairfax County. It has an asphalt surface in some places and a stonedust surface in others.

== History ==
The Holmes Run Trail was first envisioned as a trail along the Holmes Run stream valley in the 1970s as part of the Cameron Run Valley flood control project that built Cameron Run Regional Park. The first 1.5 miles of the trail were built, from Cameron Run to the west end of Dora Kelly Nature Park as part of the Cameron Run project in the early 1980s. Fairfax County began work in 2006 to extend the trail 1.5 miles in Fairfax County from Glen Hills Park to Columbia Pike. That work was completed in 2007, but the two sections didn't connect as they were separated by Holmes Run. In 2012, Alexandria built a trail underpass below Eisenhower Avenue to connect Holmes Run to the Eisenhower Avenue Trail - which had been built about a decade earlier. In 2013 Alexandria built a low water crossing from Glen Hills Park to Dora Kelly Nature Park in the area of Chambliss Street, connecting the two southern sections of the trail. In November 2018, a trail bridge across Holmes Run was built by Alexandria to replace a low water crossing at N. Ripley Street.

The trail section west of Lake Barcroft in Fairfax County was built prior to 2001.

== Trail route ==
The paved 3.8-mile-long (6.1 km) southern section of the Holmes Run Trail begins near Cameron Run Regional Park and the Great Waves Waterpark in southwestern Alexandria. The trail connects near its beginning to the west end of the Eisenhower Avenue Trail, which travels east between Eisenhower Avenue and the north side of Cameron Run to the Hoffman Town Center and the Eisenhower Avenue station on Washington Metro's Blue Line.

An underpass beneath Eisenhower Avenue connects the Eisenhower Avenue and Holmes Run Trails. The Holmes Run Trail begins by traveling northwest from Eisenhower Avenue along the northeast side of Cameron Run, passing under the Blue Line and three railroad bridges that are separated by sections of Cameron Run Regional Park. The trail then enters the easternmost portion of Ben Brenman Park, where it passes the origin of Cameron Run at the confluence of Holmes Run and Backlick Run.

The trail then travels northwest on the east side of Holmes Run within Ben Brenman Park, where it connects to a paved trail that crosses the Run. That trail travels west near the north side of Backlick Run through Ben Brenman Park and Cameron Station Linear Park to reach Armistead Boothe Park, which is adjacent to the Samuel W. Tucker Elementary School.

After leaving its intersection with the Backlick Run trail, the Holmes Run Trail continues to travel northwest in Alexandria on the east side of the Run and passes under Duke Street. The trail then travels through Holmes Run Park, passing the Charles Beatley Bridge, which crosses the Run to connect the trail with North Pickett Street and Holmes Run Parkway.

The trail continues northwest through Brookvalley Park, where it crosses the Run to the stream's west side. The trail then travels next to the Run under North Van Dorn Street and the Henry G. Shirley Memorial Highway (Interstate 395). The trail then crosses North Beauregard Street and returns to the east side of the Run.

The trail then continues northwest through several wooded sections on the east side of the Run in Dora Kelley Nature Park until it reaches North Chambliss Street, where a bridge carries the trail over the Run to its west side. Shortly thereafter, the trail enters Fairfax County and travels through Glen Hills Park on the Run's west side.

After leaving Glen Hills Park, the southern section of the trail continues northwest on the west side of the Run, passing to the east of the Parklawn Pool. The trail then crosses the Run five times in Holmes Run Stream Valley Park and Lillian Carey Park before it reaches its end on the east side of the Run. There the trail connects to the Columbia Pike Trail. The trail section meets at its terminus a trail that travels along the southeast side of Columbia Pike.

Separated by Lake Barcroft from the longer southern section of the trail, the trail's 1.2-mile-long (1.9 km) northern section begins at the southeast side of a cul-de-sac at the north end of Sprucedale Drive, west of Sleepy Hollow Road (Virginia State Route 613) and south of Holmes Run. The trail initially travels east and then turns to travel north, crossing Holmes Run on a bridge to reach the Run's north side. The trail then travels northwest on the north side of the Run through Holmes Run Stream Valley Park. The trail terminates at the south end of Hockett Street, which travels north and connects the trail to the nearby Annandale Road (Virginia State Route 649). While portions of the northern section are paved, that section has a stone dust surface along most of its length.

== Flooding ==
Users of the trail need to know the weather conditions before entering the trail. Holmes Run is part of the Cameron Run/Holmes Run Watershed, and is used to help channel flood waters toward Cameron Run and the Potomac River. Because the trail travels near the level of the water, during and after rainstorms various parts may be submerged, especially on the section of trail that goes underneath Interstate 395.

== Gallery ==
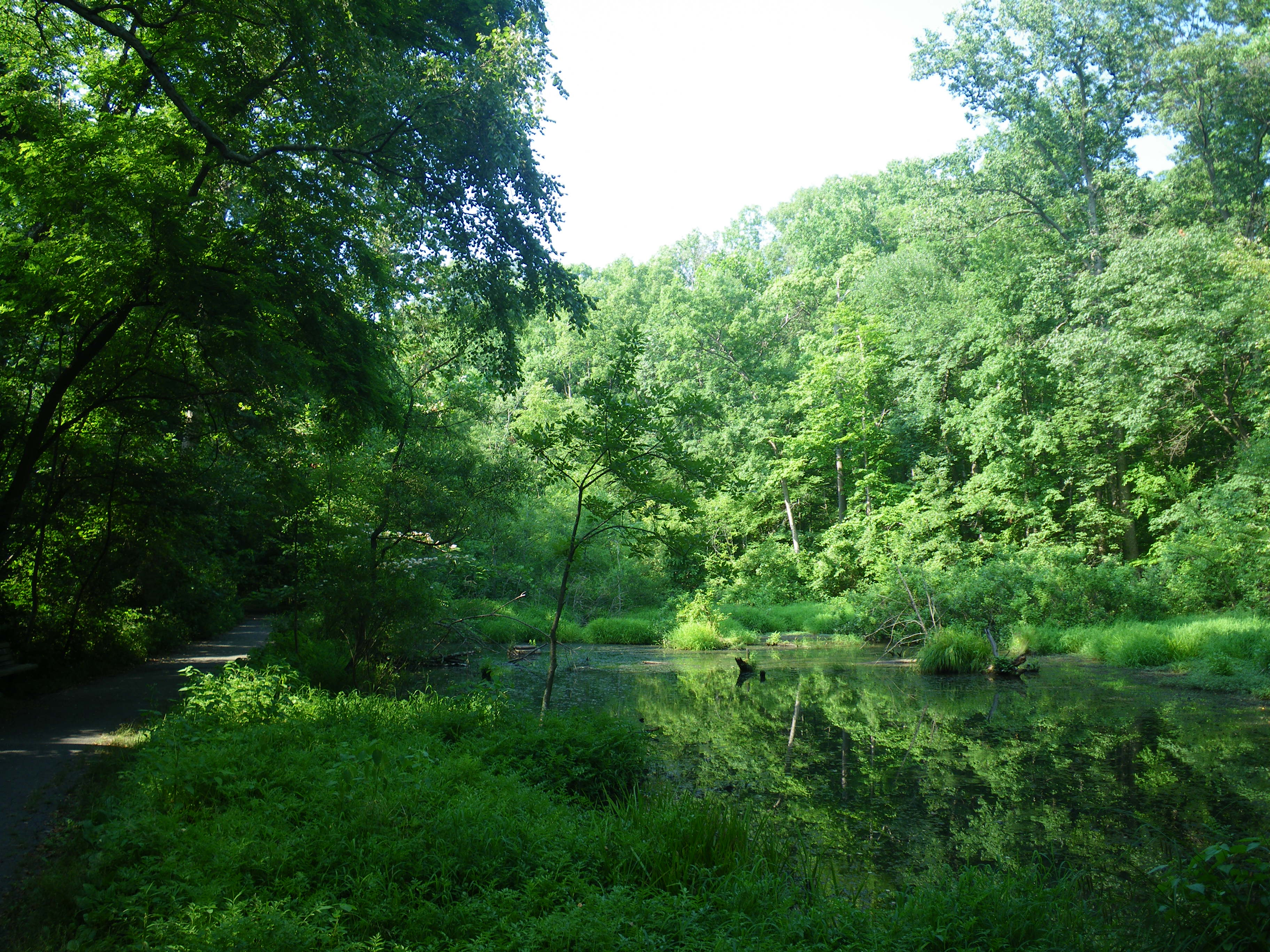
trail running next to a pond

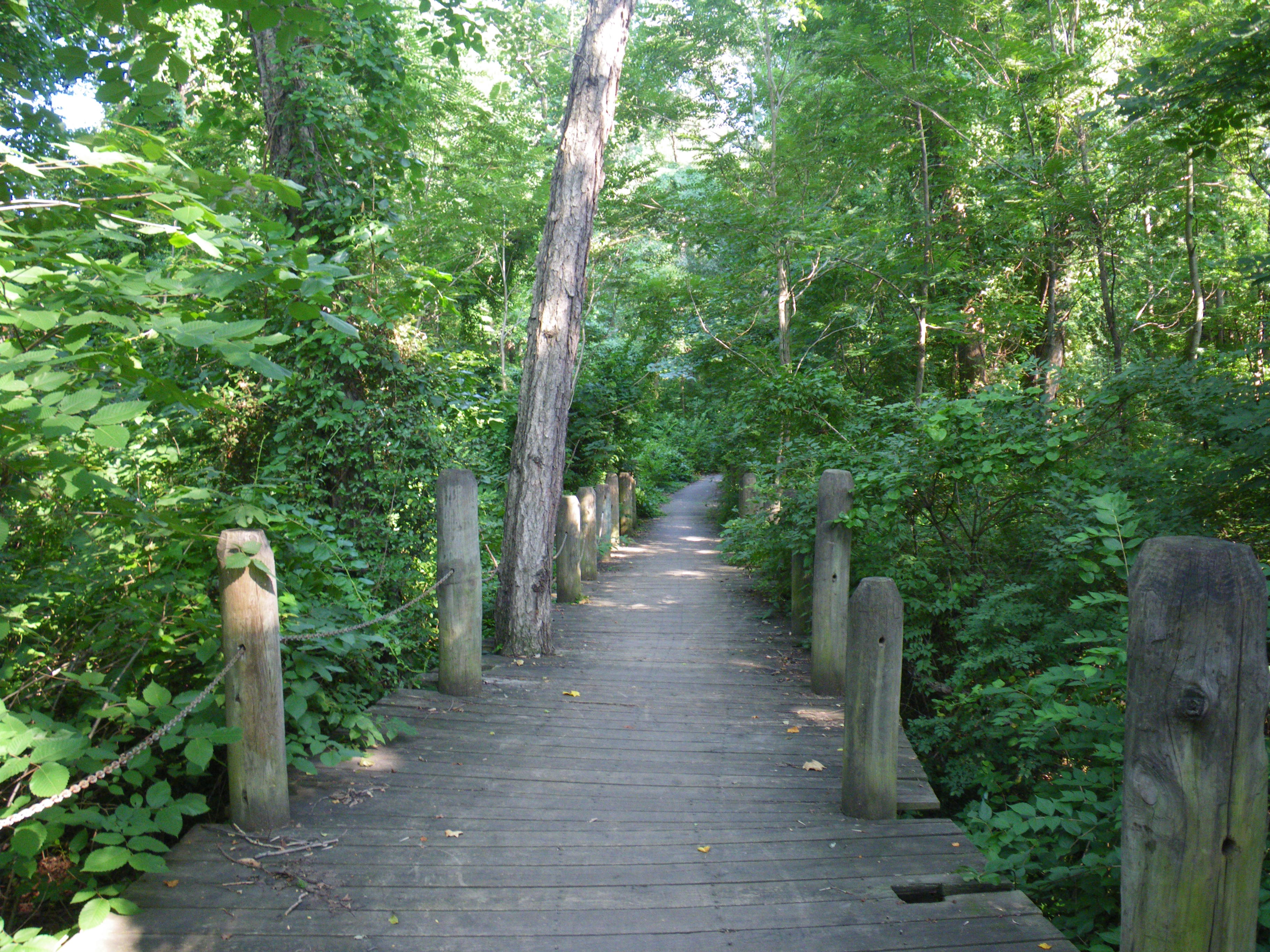
trail running south from Beauregard Street

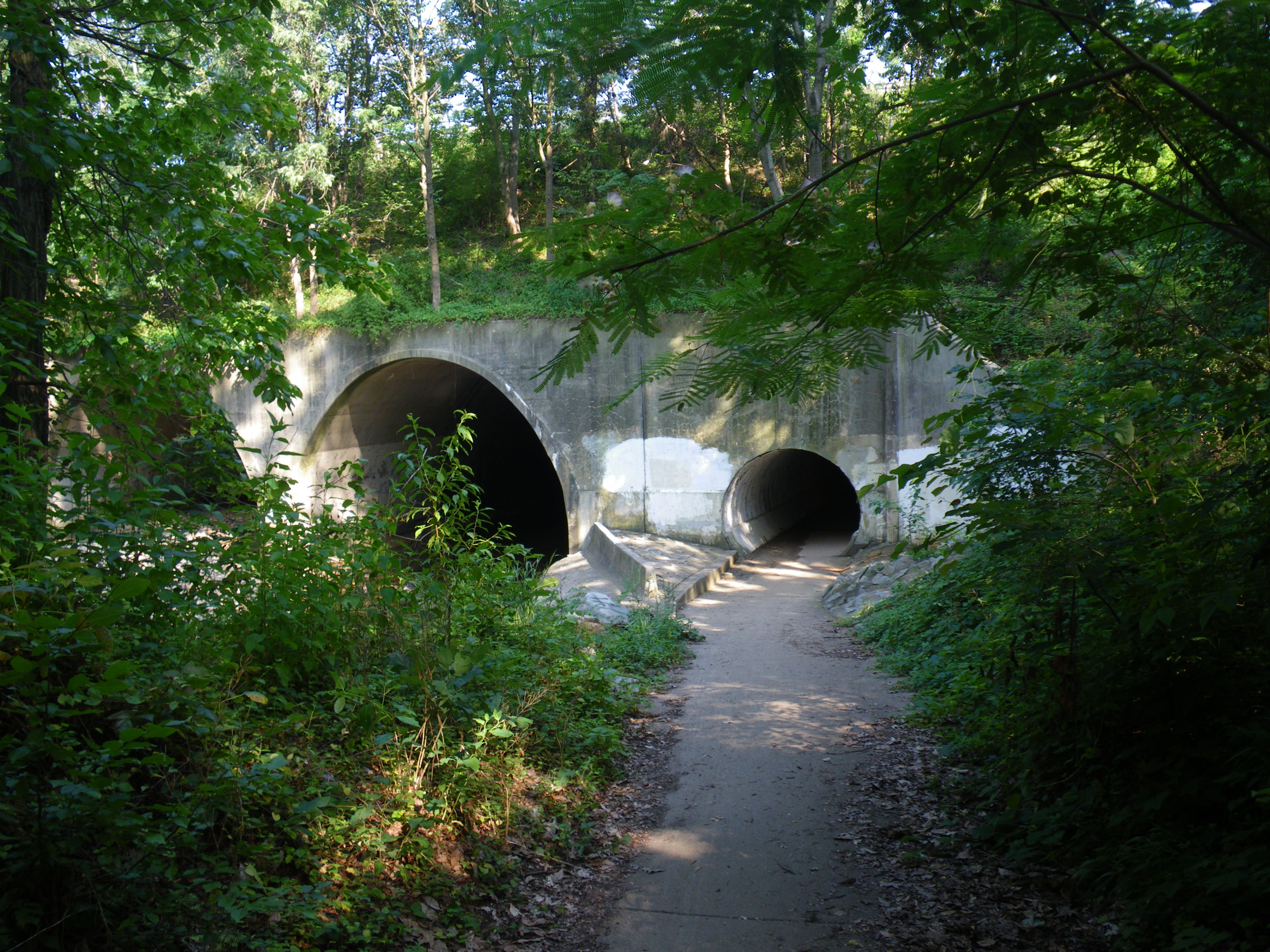
entrance to tunnel under I-395

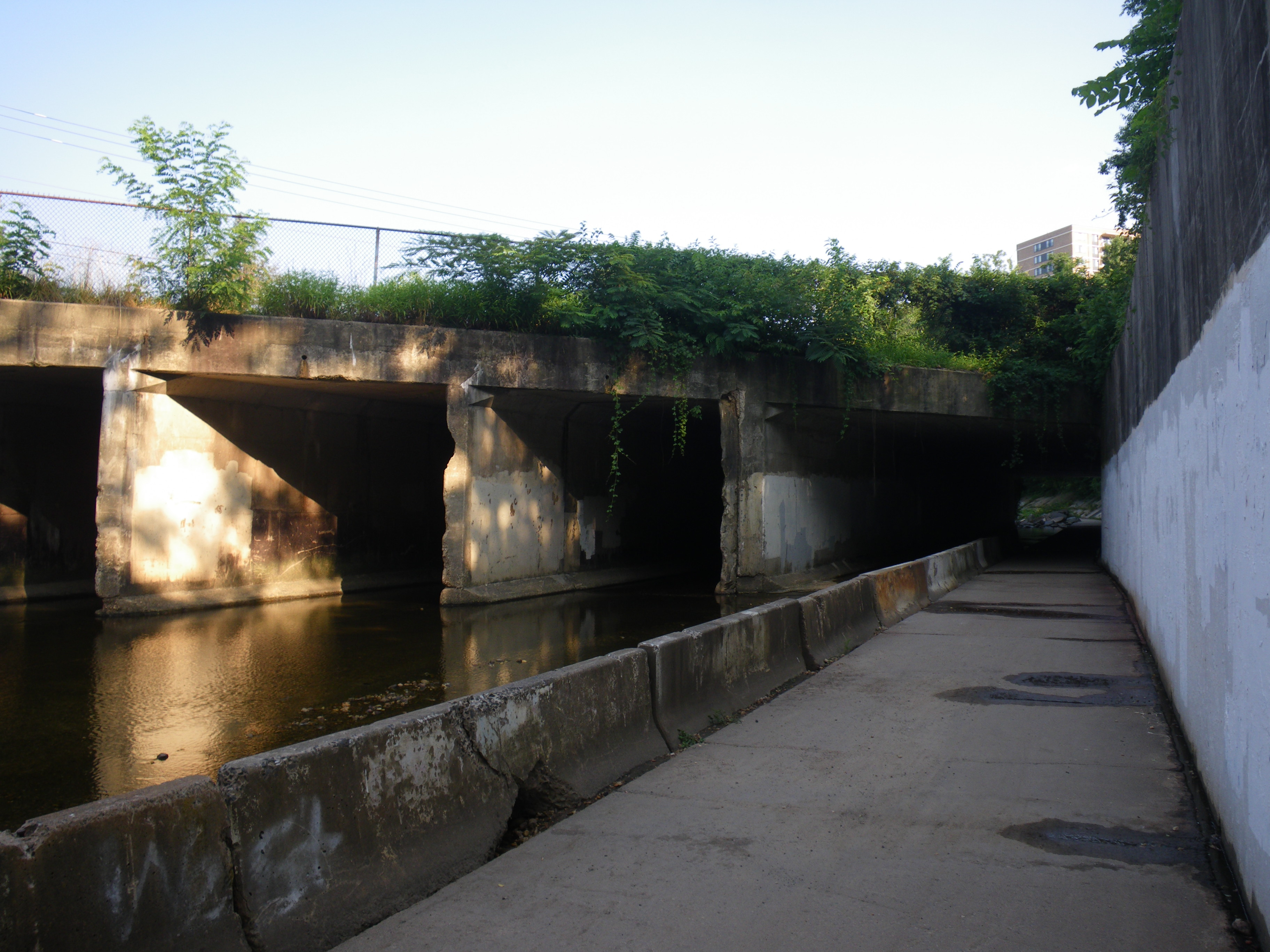
this section floods frequently

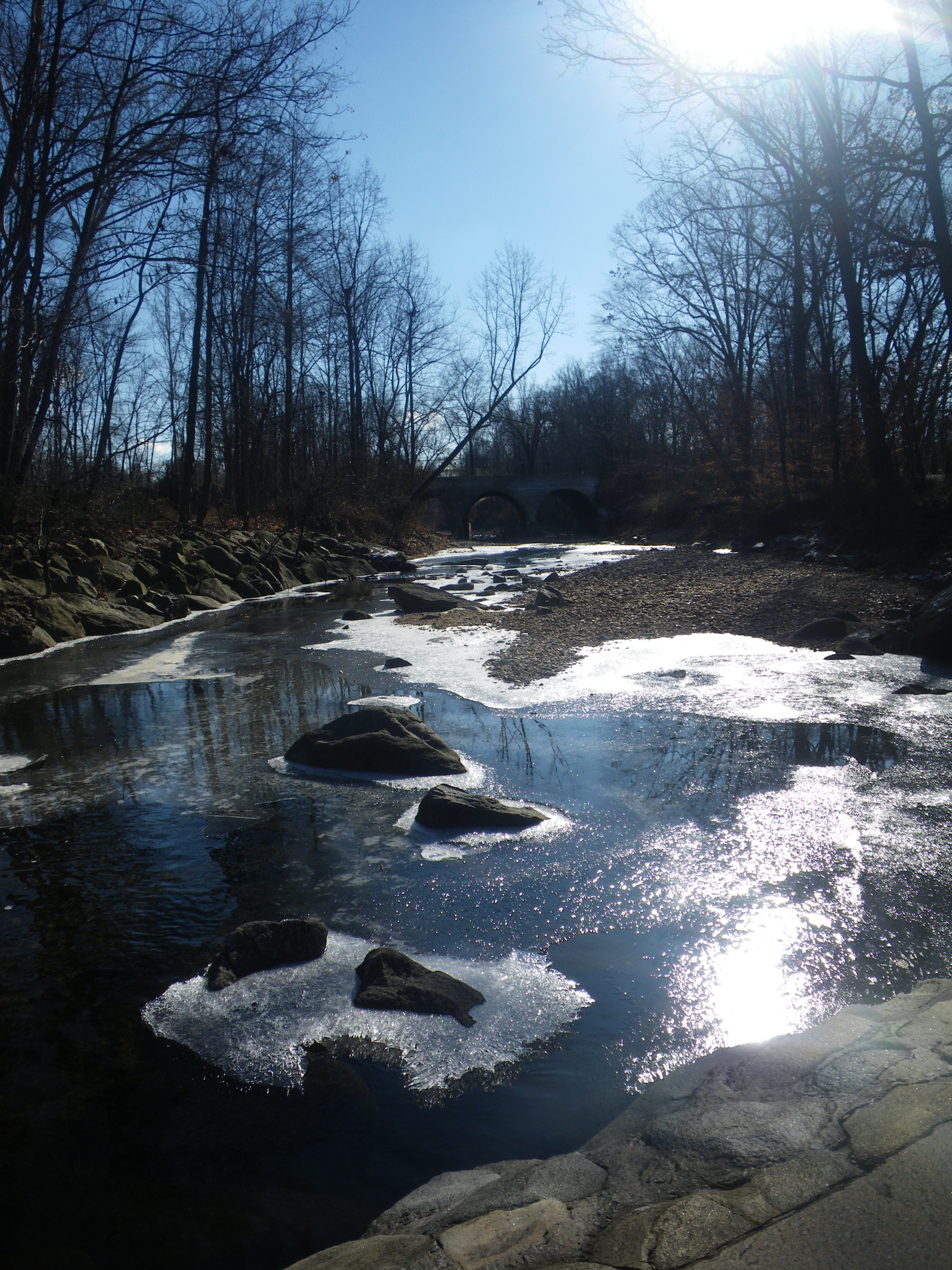
Holmes Run during the winter
