= List of crossings of Cameron Run =

This is a complete list of current bridges and other crossings of Cameron Run from its mouth at the Potomac River to the sources of its two main tributaries, Holmes Run and Backlick Run.

All locations are in Virginia. Pedestrian-only bridges are marked in italics.

== Cameron Run ==
Image	Crossing	Opened	Coordinates	Notes
Alexandria–Fairfax County
	Mount Vernon Trail; George Washington Memorial Parkway	1932	38.7899°N 77.0514°W	
	US 1 (Richmond Highway)	2002–2007	38.7925°N 77.0568°W	Includes flanking bridges for interchange with I-95 / I-495 (Capital Beltway)
	WMATA Yellow Line		38.7985°N 77.0734°W	
	SR 241 (Telegraph Road)	2011	38.7990°N 77.0795°W	
	I-95 / I-495 (Capital Beltway)	2010	38.8013°N 77.0842°W	
Alexandria
	Eisenhower Avenue	1986	38.8044°N 77.1060°W	
	WMATA Blue Line		38.8053°N 77.1075°W	
	CSX Transportation RF&P Subdivision		38.8055°N 77.1080°W	
	Norfolk Southern Railway Washington District		38.8066°N 77.1096°W	
River splits into Holmes Run and Backlick Run

== Holmes Run ==
Image	Crossing	Opened	Coordinates	Notes
Alexandria
	Ben Brenman Park footbridge		38.8090°N 77.1122°W	
	SR 236 (Duke Street)	1970	38.8117°N 77.1134°W	
	Charles Beatley Bridge		38.8149°N 77.1189°W	Connects segments of N. Pickett Street
	Holmes Run Trail	2018		Replaced older fair-weather crossing
	SR 401 (N. Van Dorn Street)	1963		
	I-395 (Henry G. Shirley Memorial Highway)	1950		
	Beauregard Street	1958		
	Holmes Run Trail			
Alexandria–Fairfax County
	Holmes Run Trail	2013		
Fairfax County
	Holmes Run Trail			
	Holmes Run Trail			
	Holmes Run Trail			
	Holmes Run Trail			
	Holmes Run Trail			
	SR 244 (Columbia Pike)	1961		
	Barcroft Dam	1915		No crossing
	Lakeview Causeway			
	SR 613 (Sleepy Hollow Road)	1960		
	Rose Lane Park footbridge			
	Rose Lane Park footbridge			
	Roundtree Park footbridge			
	SR 649 (Annandale Road)	1926		
	Luria Park footbridges			Holmes Run splits into two channels at this location, both of which are crossed by footbridges
	Footbridge between Holly Berry Court and Camp Alger Avenue			
	Providence Recreation Center footbridge			
	US 50 (Arlington Boulevard)	1932, 1986		
	Defense Health Agency driveway			
	Fairview Lake dam			No crossing
	Fairview Park Drive			
	US 29 (Lee Highway)			
	Shreve Road; I-495 (Capital Beltway); I-66 (Custis Memorial Parkway); WMATA Orange, Blue, and Silver Lines; Washington & Old Dominion Trail	1963, 1982		multiple culverts under interchange
	SR 695 (Idylwood Road)			
	Morgan Lane Dam			no crossing
	Railroad Street Dam			
	footbridge			

== Backlick Run ==
Image	Crossing	Opened	Coordinates	Notes
Alexandria
	Ben Brenman Park footbridge		38.8074°N 77.1129°W	
	Ben Brenman Park footbridge		38.8064°N 77.1170°W	
	SR 401 (S. Van Dorn Street)	1932	38.8032°N 77.1339°W	
Fairfax County
	rail siding			
	Norfolk Southern Railway Washington District			
	I-395 / I-495 (Springfield Interchange)	1961, 1962		Crosses I-395 (Henry G. Shirley Memorial Highway) once, but crosses the westbound lanes of I-495 (Capital Beltway) twice to emerge on same side. Stream alternates between multiple culverts and surface portions crossed by bridges.
	Versar Center driveway			
	Norfolk Southern Railway Washington District			
	SR 617 (Backlick Road)	1966		
	Leesville Boulevard	1970		
	SR 620 (Braddock Road)	1963		
	driveway			
	Ravensworth Road			
