= Cameron Run Watershed =

Urbanized watershed in Virginia, United States

Coordinates: 38.792705°N 77.057069°W

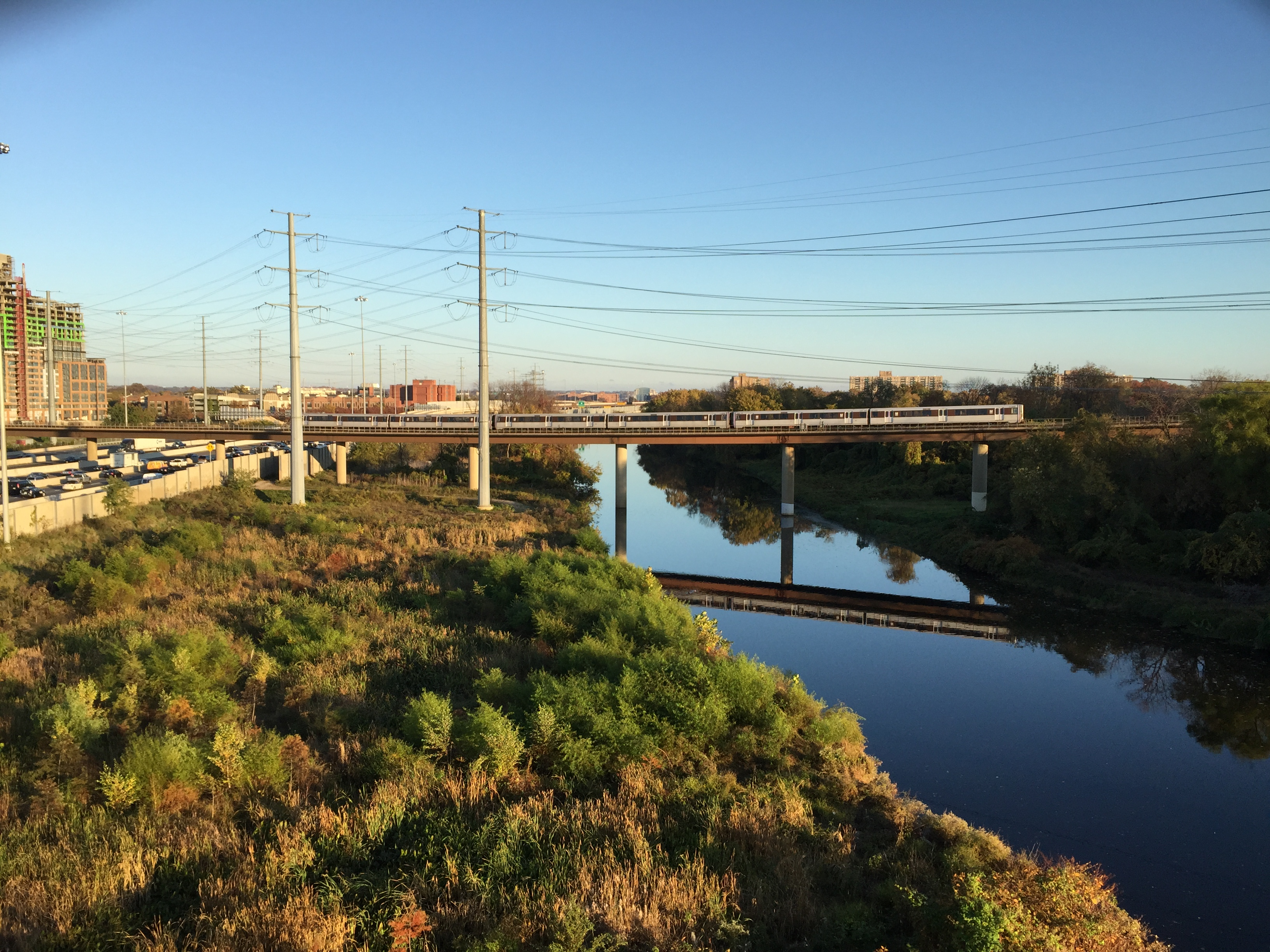
The Washington Metro's Yellow Line crosses Cameron Run.

The Cameron Run Watershed (CRW) is a highly urbanized, 44 square-mile watershed located in Northern Virginia. "The region is completely urbanized with nearly 95 percent of the watershed developed with mixed residential and commercial use". Seventy-five percent of the watershed lies in Fairfax County, and the rest lies in Arlington County and the cities of Falls Church and Alexandria.

In addition to several streams, called “runs”, there are two lakes, Lake Barcroft (137 acres) and Fairview Lake (15 acres), and four ponds. There are eight sub-watersheds within the CRW. The western part of the CRW lies within the Piedmont; the southeastern part in the Coastal Plain.

== Tributaries ==
Holmes Run is the primary headwater stream of the CRW. In addition to Holmes Run, the other tributaries to the CRW are: Tripps Run, Backlick Run, Indian Run, and Pike Branch, which all join Cameron Run. Hunting Creek joins Cameron Run right before emptying into the Potomac River. The tributaries map as follows: From the northwest come the Upper Holmes and Tripps Runs via Lake Barcroft (the two runs become the Lower Holmes Run after the pass-through dam on Lake Barcroft); and from the west, Turkeycock Run and Indian Run converge with Backlick Run. In the lower center of the watershed: Backlick and Lower Holmes Run and Pike Branch (flanking in from the south) converge with Cameron Run from the northeast.

== History ==
=== 17th century ===
Cameron Run Watershed was heavily forested until the mid-17th century. A large beaver population created wetlands amid numerous ponds that provided habitat for a wide variety of flora and fauna. Native Americans, and more specifically members of the Dogue tribe were the first human inhabitants of the area. It’s difficult to pinpoint exactly when they arrived—probably around 1250 A.D.--several centuries before the Europeans, trapping, fishing, and clearing land for farming.

=== 18th century ===
The first changes to the watershed came when Europeans wiped out the beaver population for their pelts, which led to deterioration of their dams and “changed the hydrology and ecosystem of the stream valley”. From the mid to late 17th century to the early 18th century, Europeans concentrated on farming tobacco, which greatly impacted soil fertility and erosion.

In the 1720s, "Yankees” from New York brought new farming practices (fallowing land; bringing new/different seed stock; rotating crops; planting clover to enrich soil; using lime and animal waste as fertilizer; using deeper plowing practices)

=== 19th century ===
The growth of the federal government] in the late 19th century meant more people moving to Northern Virginia, and expansion of housing and the development of Arlington, Alexandria, and Falls Church cities. The first subdivision was built by 1891. Necessary infrastructure, such as reservoirs and sewers soon followed.

=== 20th century ===
In response to the City of Alexandria’s need for water, Lake Barcroft was formed as a reservoir in 1915, and served as the water supply for the City of Alexandria until the late 1940s; When the need for water increased due to population growth, the City of Alexandria then constructed a dam on the Occoquan River in 1950 to form the Occoquan Reservoir 670.

In 1928, Fairfax County proposed a sanitation ordinance, but all sewage was dumped untreated into the tributaries as well as the Potomac River until the 1950s. The first sewer lines ran from Falls Church to the Potomac, along Tripps Run, Holmes Run, and Cameron Run. These sewer lines dumped raw sewage directly into the Potomac until 1954

There was enough support in September 1955 to pass a $30 million water bond.; by the end of the 1950s, residential subdivisions covered the northern half of the watershed, and by 1965, most land suitable for development had been built upon

As development occurred in the watershed, the floodplains along the perennial streams were altered. Naturally occurring wetlands were filled in or drained to make way for structures, including roads, bridges, and housing. "Marshes were once extensive in both the Piedmont and Coastal Plain parts of the watershed, but today only a few wetlands remain . . . The Virginia Department of Forestry reports a 32% decrease in forest resources in the watershed from 1957 to 1992".

Developers were able to build in the lower third of the CRW in the late 1940s and early 1950s because there was no standard for environmental impact at the time.

In 1969, the National Environmental Policy Act (NEPA) took effect in 1969. National Environmental Policy Act was "one of the first laws ever written that establishes the broad national framework for protecting our environment . . . to assure that all branches of government give proper consideration to the environment prior to undertaking any major federal action that significantly affects the environment". Any type of proposed building, including highways and structures, must undergo a thorough NEPA assessment before approval. Many of the natural stream channels were piped, resulting in a network of storm sewers and culverts. In particular, Cameron Run was both straightened and moved to accommodate the Beltway and Route 1 interchanges and expansions.

The effects of urbanization, such as impervious surfaces, channelization, and storm sewers, led to frequent flash flooding in the lower portion of the watershed. Highly erodible soils and frequent, intense rainstorms also contributed to the flooding. The county addressed this problem by constructing flood-control channels in lower Holmes Run, lower Backlick Run, and Cameron Run. But "channelized streams generally are wider and straighter than natural stream channels, and they are disconnected from the floodplain. Floodwaters that normally soak into floodplain soils and recharge groundwater are rapidly exported downstream in channelized streams"

The original dam at Lake Barcroft continued in service until 1972 when rain from the remnants of Hurricane Agnes caused exceptionally high water to erode the earthen embankment at the western end of the masonry portion of the Lake Barcroft dam. The erosion scoured out the embankment and drained the lake. The Lake Barcroft Watershed Improvement District (LBWID) was formed in 1973 in the wake of the damage caused by Hurricane Agnes the previous year. Today, the WID functions as a State Agency to maintain and operate the dam, manage water quality of the lake, manage the discharges from the dam and maintain and improve the environmental integrity of the watershed above the lake. By law, the WID must maintain the water level of the lake. The dam is designed and operated to maintain a nearly constant water level between 208.5 and 209 feet above mean sea level, and discharges the same amount of water it collects as runoff from 14.5 square miles of Fairfax County and the City of Falls Church. The dam is not designed for or operated in a flood control capacity.

In response to two major rainfall events—Tropical Storms Agnes (1972) and Eloise (1975) in addition to flash flooding in September 1966, in which several adjacent properties were flooded—a report was commissioned by the U.S. Army Corps of Engineers which eventually led to Cameron Run being channelized. A federal flood control project was also recommended, but the plan was scrapped due to land boundary issues between Fairfax County and Alexandria. The issue was resolved with a land transfer to Alexandria, in January 1973.

Alexandria then used its own resources to channelize Cameron Run upstream of the Capital Beltway, not as a federal program.

== Recent flood events ==
A major rain event that took place June 25–28, 2006 led to extreme flooding in the Cameron Run Watershed. The United States Army Corps of Engineers (CoE) was commissioned to study the Cameron Run Watershed to determine the best course of action to prevent future flooding events, especially in the Huntington, Virginia area. From that 2009 study, the U.S. Army Corps of Engineers proposed a levee 2800 feet long, running from Fenwick Drive west to the Riverside Apartments. The levee will be 15 feet high (from ground level), 10 feet wide at the top and at least seven times that width at the base. The levee will also have a pumping station to transport the water back to Cameron Run. In 2012, voters approved a storm water bond referendum; the design phase will end January 2014; survey work will commence July 2014. The project will take 3–5 years to design, and another two years to construct There has been one further major flooding event from the remnants of Tropical Storm Lee in September 2011.
