= Lincolnia, Virginia =

- Census-designated place
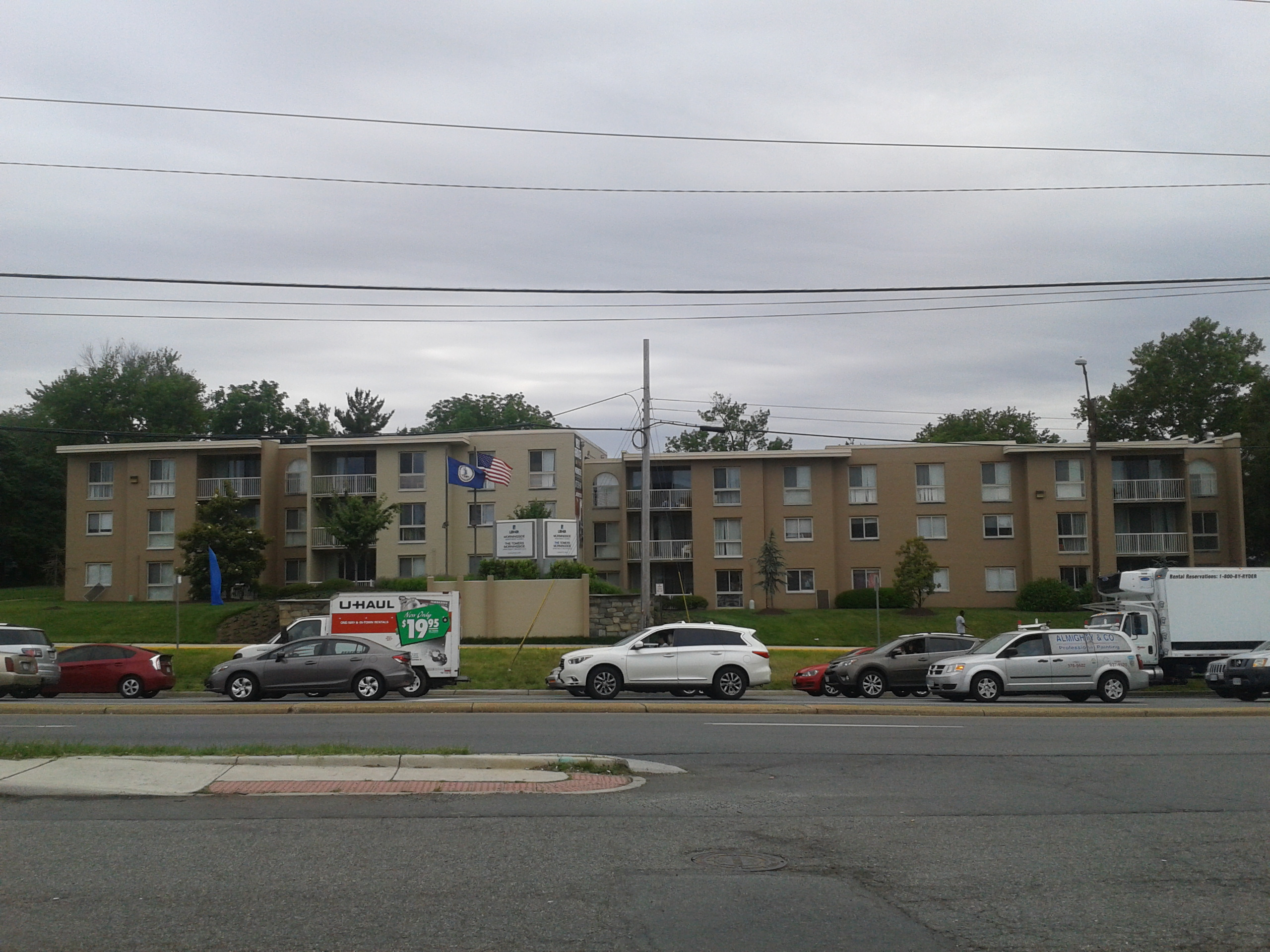
- Apartment complex in Lincolnia, May 2017

- Location of Lincolnia in Fairfax County, Virginia

- Location within Northern Virginia Location within Virginia Location within the United States
- Coordinates: 38°49′5″N 77°8′35″W
- Country: United States
- State: Virginia
- County: Fairfax

Area
  - Total: 4.75 sq mi (12.30 km^{2})
  - Land: 4.72 sq mi (12.22 km^{2})
  - Water: 0.031 sq mi (0.08 km^{2})
- Elevation: 246 ft (75 m)

Population (2020)
  - Total: 22,922
  - Density: 4,840/sq mi (1,868/km^{2})
- Time zone: UTC-5 (Eastern (EST))
  - Summer (DST): UTC-4 (EDT)
- FIPS code: 51-45784
- GNIS feature ID: 1493198

Lincolnia is a census-designated place (CDP) in Fairfax County, Virginia, United States. As of the 2020 census, Lincolnia had a population of 22,922.

== Geography ==
Lincolnia is located in eastern Fairfax County at 38°49′5″N 77°8′35″W (38.8184, -77.1433). It is bordered to the east by the city of Alexandria, to the south by Franconia, to the southwest by Springfield, to the west by Annandale, to the northwest by Lake Barcroft, and to the northeast by Bailey's Crossroads. Interstate 395 passes through the southern part of the CDP, with access from Exit 2 (Edsall Road), and Virginia State Route 236 (Little River Turnpike) passes through the center of the CDP. I-395 leads northeast 10 miles (16 km) into the District of Columbia, while VA 236 leads east 6 miles (10 km) to Old Town Alexandria and west 8 miles (13 km) to Fairfax.

The CDP border follows Columbia Pike and Holmes Run to the north, its border with the city of Alexandria to the east, Interstate 395, Interstate 495, and the VRE Fredericksburg Line to the south, and Edsall Road, Clifton Street, Braddock Road, and Little River Turnpike to the west.

According to the United States Census Bureau, the CDP has a total area of 4.7 square miles (12.3 km^{2}), of which 0.03 square miles (0.08 km^{2}), or 0.64%, is water.

== Demographics ==
Historical population
Census	Pop.	Note	%±
1970	10,761		—
1980	10,350		−3.8%
1990	13,041		26.0%
2000	15,788		21.1%
2010	22,828		44.6%
2020	22,922		0.4%

=== Racial and ethnic composition ===
Lincolnia CDP, Virginia – Racial and ethnic composition Note: the US Census treats Hispanic/Latino as an ethnic category. This table excludes Latinos from the racial categories and assigns them to a separate category. Hispanics/Latinos may be of any race.
Race / Ethnicity (NH = Non-Hispanic)	Pop 2000	Pop 2010	Pop 2020	% 2000	% 2010	% 2020
White alone (NH)	6,060	7,979	7,202	38.38%	34.91%	31.42%
Black or African American alone (NH)	2,933	4,679	4,758	18.58%	20.47%	20.76%
Native American or Alaska Native alone (NH)	30	42	21	0.19%	0.18%	0.09%
Asian alone (NH)	2,366	3,469	4,006	14.99%	15.18%	17.48%
Native Hawaiian or Pacific Islander alone (NH)	3	10	15	0.02%	0.04%	0.07%
Other race alone (NH)	61	85	163	0.39%	0.37%	0.71%
Mixed race or Multiracial (NH)	803	577	987	5.09%	2.52%	4.31%
Hispanic or Latino (any race)	3,532	6,014	5,770	22.37%	26.31%	25.17%
Total	15,788	22,855	22,922	100.00%	100.00%	100.00%

=== 2020 census ===
As of the 2020 census, Lincolnia had a population of 22,922. The median age was 36.4 years. 22.4% of residents were under the age of 18 and 12.1% of residents were 65 years of age or older. For every 100 females there were 97.2 males, and for every 100 females age 18 and over there were 95.6 males age 18 and over.

100.0% of residents lived in urban areas, while 0.0% lived in rural areas.

There were 8,336 households in Lincolnia, of which 33.0% had children under the age of 18 living in them. Of all households, 47.2% were married-couple households, 19.4% were households with a male householder and no spouse or partner present, and 27.8% were households with a female householder and no spouse or partner present. About 26.0% of all households were made up of individuals and 7.5% had someone living alone who was 65 years of age or older.

There were 8,590 housing units, of which 3.0% were vacant. The homeowner vacancy rate was 0.9% and the rental vacancy rate was 3.7%.

Racial composition as of the 2020 census
Race	Number	Percent
White	7,810	34.1%
Black or African American	4,841	21.1%
American Indian and Alaska Native	176	0.8%
Asian	4,036	17.6%
Native Hawaiian and Other Pacific Islander	17	0.1%
Some other race	3,289	14.3%
Two or more races	2,753	12.0%
Hispanic or Latino (of any race)	5,770	25.2%

=== 2000 census ===
As of the census of 2000, there were 15,788 people, 5,166 households, and 3,704 families residing in the CDP. The population density was 5,369.5 inhabitants per square mile (2,073.2/km^{2}). There were 5,255 housing units at an average density of 1,787.2 per square mile (690.0/km^{2}). The racial makeup of the CDP was 47.62% White, 18.82% African American, 0.22% Native American, 15.01% Asian, 0.02% Pacific Islander, 11.48% from other races, and 6.83% from two or more races. Hispanic or Latino of any race were 22.37% of the population. Lincolnia is the most diverse area in Fairfax County.

There were 5,166 households, out of which 36.7% had children under the age of 18 living with them, 54.7% were married couples living together, 10.8% had a female householder with no husband present, and 28.3% were non-families. 20.2% of all households were made up of individuals, and 4.8% had someone living alone who was 65 years of age or older. The average household size was 3.03 while the average family size was 3.45.

In the CDP, the population was spread out, with 25.3% under the age of 18, 9.9% from 18 to 24, 35.3% from 25 to 44, 21.6% from 45 to 64, and 7.9% who were 65 years of age or older. The median age was 33 years. For every 100 females, there were 104.0 males. For every 100 females age 18 and over, there were 102.2 males.

The median income for a household in the CDP was $64,148, and the median income for a family was $65,601. Males had a median income of $39,146 versus $35,398 for females. The per capita income for the CDP was $26,876. About 7.9% of families and 11.8% of the population were below the poverty line, including 16.2% of those under age 18 and 9.5% of those age 65 or over.

== History ==
Originally created following the Civil War as a community of freed slaves, Lincolnia remained as one of Fairfax County's original communities of African Americans for over 100 years. During segregation, Lincolnia had its own schoolhouse. The historical structure is still standing, now incorporated into Lincolnia Senior Center. The school became integrated in 1962 as part of court-ordered busing. The African American students were bused out and white students were bused in.

== See also ==
- Virginia State Route 613 (Fairfax County) (Lincolnia Road)
