= Holmes Run =

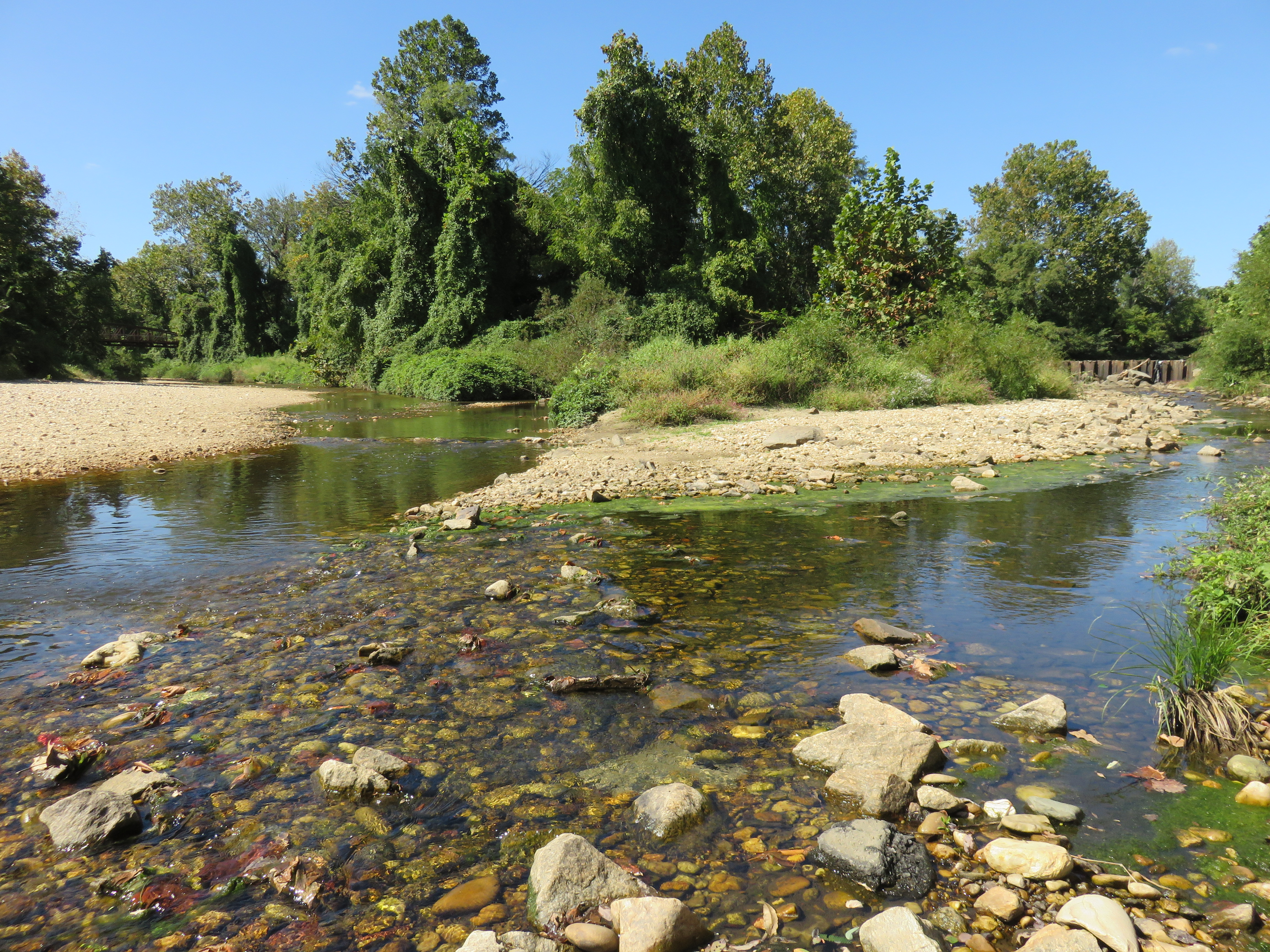
- The confluence of Holmes Run (right) and Backlick Run (left) into Cameron Run (foreground) at Ben Brenman Park, Alexandria, Virginia, 1 October 2017

Location
- Country: United States
- State: Virginia

Physical characteristics
- Mouth
  - location: Cameron Run
  - coordinates: 38°48′27″N 77°06′40″W
- Length: 10.5 mi (16.9 km)

Basin features
- GNIS feature ID: 1478779

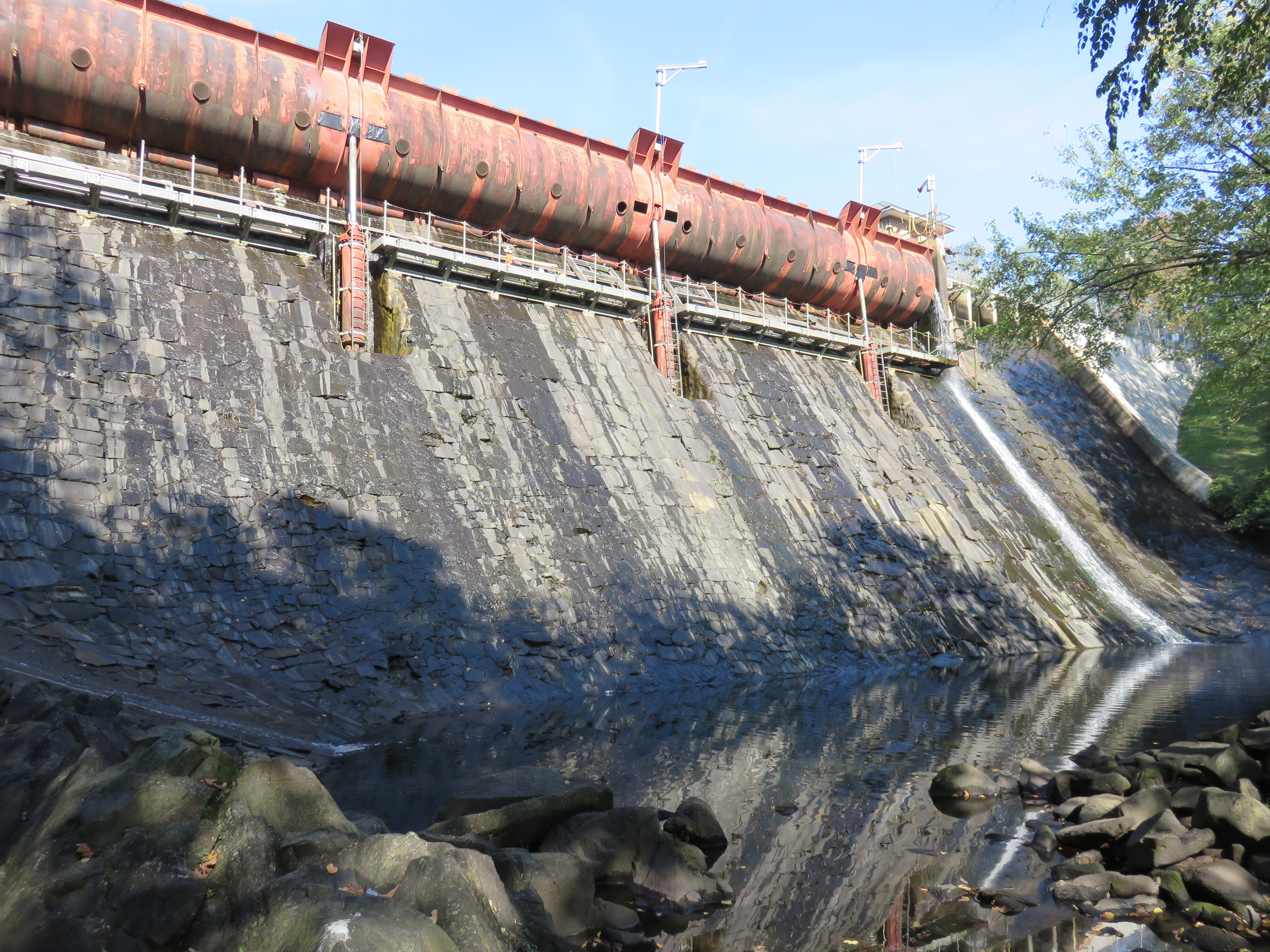
The masonry dam across Holmes Run that creates Barcroft Lake, Fairfax County, Virginia, 22 October 2017

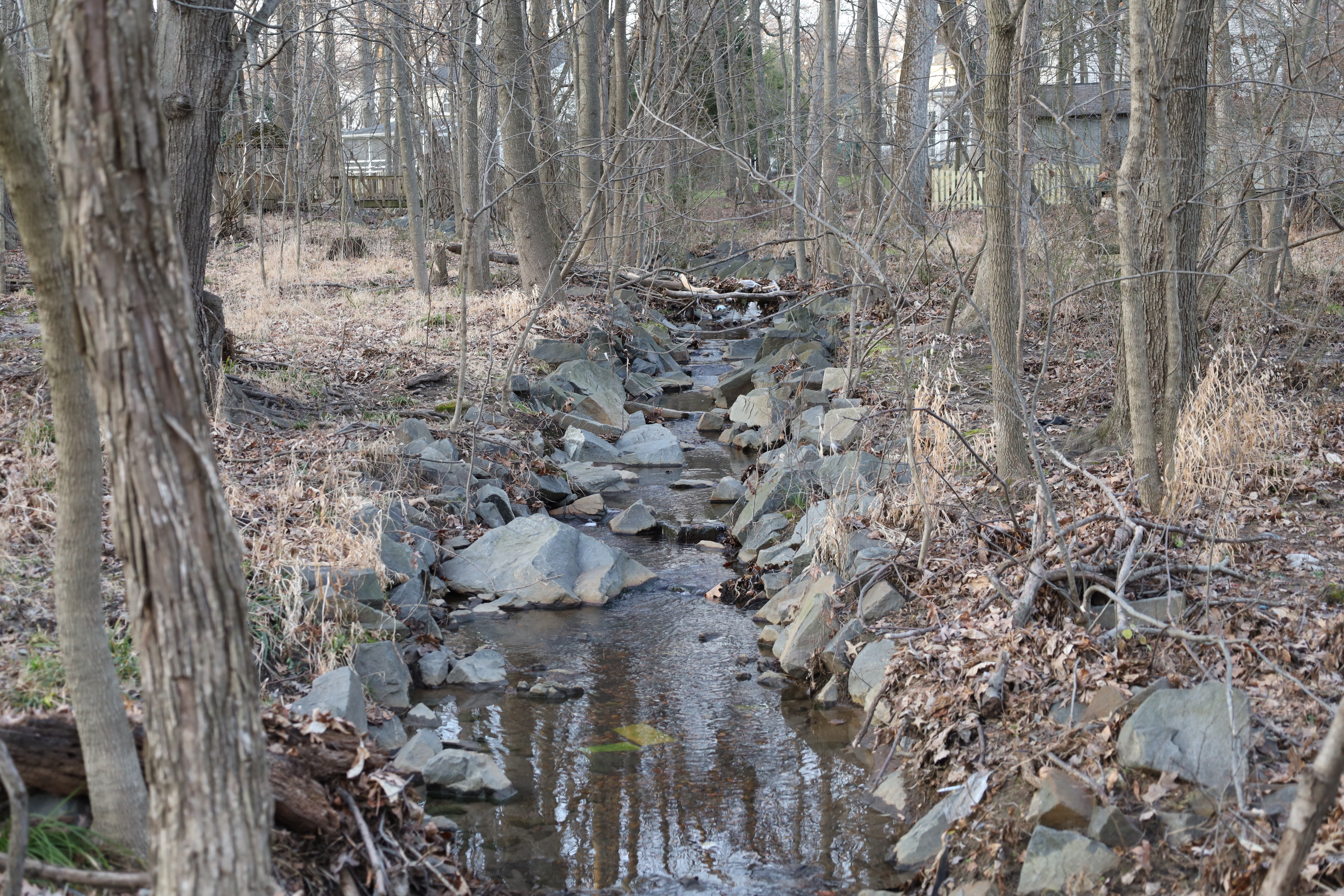
Looking towards the source of Holmes Run in Dunn Loring, Virginia

Holmes Run is a stream in the Cameron Run Watershed in Northern Virginia. It runs through Fairfax County and the City of Alexandria. It is a first-order tributary of the Potomac River.

Its headwater is near the junction of I-495 and I-66. It crosses the region in a southeasterly direction for ten and a half miles until it merges with Backlick Run to form Cameron Run. Cameron Run becomes Hunting Creek and empties into the Potomac River just south of the Woodrow Wilson Bridge.

In 1913–1915 the Alexandria Water Company built a dam on Holmes Run in order to create Lake Barcroft as a potable water reservoir for Alexandria. In the early post-war era, Alexandria began to exceed the capacity of Lake Barcroft and in 1949 discontinued its use in favor of Occoquan Reservoir.

== Physical description ==
As an urban river, Holmes Run has in places been heavily channelized, but also significant portions have been developed as urban greenspace as Holmes Run Trail.

Above Lake Barcroft its route makes up the border of West Falls Church and Annandale.

== See also ==
- List of crossings of Holmes Run
