= Upper Occoquan Sewage Authority =

Sewage treatment plant in Virginia

The UOSA

The Millard H. Robbins, Jr. Water Reclamation Plant, which is operated by the Upper Occoquan Service Authority (UOSA), is located in Centreville, Virginia and it was formerly known as the Upper Occoquan Sewage Authority. UOSA serves the western portions of Fairfax and Prince William Counties, and the Cities of Manassas and Manassas Park. The sewage treatment plant includes primary-secondary treatment and the following advanced wastewater treatment processes: chemical clarification, two-stage recarbonation with intermediate settling, multimedia filtration, granular activated carbon adsorption, chlorination for disinfection and dechlorination. The plant’s rated capacity is 54 million US gallons (200,000 m^{3}) per day (mgd).

== Discharge permit ==
UOSA operates under a Virginia Pollutant Discharge Elimination System (VPDES) Permit, which is issued by the Department of Environmental Quality (DEQ). The Permit limitations listed in the table below are among the most stringent in the State of Virginia and possibly in the United States.

UOSA Permit Limits

Parameter	Limit
Flow, mgd	54
E. coli, number/100 mL	< 2
Chemical oxygen demand, mg/L	10.0
Turbidity, NTU	0.5
Total suspended solids, mg/L	1.0
Total Phosphorus, mg/L	0.1
Surfactants, mg/L	0.1
Total Kjeldahl Nitrogen, mg/L	1.0
Dissolved Oxygen, mg/L	Greater than 5.0
Dechlorination Chlorine Residual, mg/L	Non-detect

== Effects on Occoquan Reservoir water quality ==
The Occoquan Reservoir is a component in a water supply system that currently serves over 1.4 million residents of Northern Virginia. During the suburban expansion of the Northern Virginia region in the 1960s, the reservoir’s water quality degraded, resulting in:

- Massive algal blooms (including blue-green algae of the genus cyanobacter) due to over enrichment with plant nutrients;
- Periodic episodes of taste and odor in the finished drinking water;
- Low dissolved oxygen levels;
- Periodic fish kills; and
- Generation of hydrogen sulfide in the bottoms waters of the waters of the reservoir.

In 1968—1969 a study conducted by Metcalf and Eddy, under the auspices of the State Water Control Board, determined that water quality deterioration in the reservoir was caused by substandard wastewater discharges from 11 secondary wastewater treatment plants and non-point sources of pollution. Following the commissioning of UOSA, the water quality of the Occoquan Reservoir has greatly improved.

UOSA discharges a highly nitrified reclaimed water into Bull Run, which is a major tributary of the reservoir. Research conducted by the Occoquan Watershed Monitoring Laboratory (OWML) has shown that the nitrate in the UOSA reclaimed water has benefited the reservoir water quality specifically by:

- Preventing the release of sediment bound phosphorus;
- Reducing the release of ammonia from reservoir sediments;
- Preventing the reduction of sulfate to sulfide in the bottom layers of the reservoir;
- Possibly preventing the release of manganese (II) from sediments; and
- Maintaining green algae and diatoms species dominance and preventing the proliferation of less desirable blue-green algae.

According to OWML’s research, phosphorus releases are prevented when, in the absence of molecular oxygen in the lower levels of the reservoir, nitrate acts as an alternate terminal electron acceptor for certain bacteria delaying the onset of anaerobic conditions and inhibiting the release of iron-bound phosphorus from the sediments. During this process the nitrate is converted to nitrogen gas, which is released to the atmosphere. This is a fortuitous process that occurs because, during periods of thermal stratification, the waters of Bull Run enter the reservoir at lower temperatures than the surface waters causing the high nitrate water to sink to the oxygen-deficient lower reservoir depths.

The Virginia DEQ recognizes the water quality protection benefits of the UOSA nitrified discharge on the Occoquan Reservoir in State permits.

== Related information ==
The UOSA plant is relatively unique in that the highly treated output from the plant supplies roughly 20% of the inflow into the Occoquan Reservoir, which provides drinking water used by the Fairfax County Water Authority. During drought periods the plant may briefly provide up to 90% of the reservoir inflow. In effect, Fairfax Water is drawing a portion of its influent from recycled sewage. UOSA has proven, indisputably, that treated plant effluent is actually far cleaner than the stream sources of surface water inflow into the Occoquan Reservoir.

Other Fairfax County sewage treatment facilities include the Noman M. Cole, Jr. Plant in Lorton, Virginia. Eastern Prince William County is served by the H. L. Mooney Advanced Water Reclamation Facility in Woodbridge, Virginia.

== History ==
In the 1960s, the Occoquan Watershed began its transformation from a largely rural area to a predominately urban/suburban region. This rapid growth resulted in deterioration of water quality in the nearly 10 billion US gallons (38,000,000 m^{3}) Occoquan Reservoir, a principal drinking water supply for Northern Virginia] In 1971, the Virginia Water Control Board, in agreement with the Virginia Department of Health, adopted a bold and innovative policy. The Occoquan Policy mandated the creation of a regional agency, the Upper Occoquan Service Authority (UOSA), to provide state-of-the-art treatment for all wastewater generated in the Occoquan Watershed, and an independent organization, the Occoquan Watershed Monitoring Laboratory, to continuously monitor the Watershed and provide advice on protective measures for the Reservoir.

In 1978, the UOSA Regional Water Reclamation Plant, located on 470 acres (1.9 km^{2}) in western Fairfax County, commenced operations and replaced eleven small secondary treatment plants in the region. Since that time, water quality in the Occoquan Reservoir has steadily improved and the reliable, high-quality effluent produced by UOSA has increased the safe yield of the Reservoir.

Through several expansions, the initial 10 million US gallons (38,000 m^{3}) per day capacity of UOSA was increased to 32 mgd, and a major expansion to 54 million US gallons (200,000 m^{3}) has been completed. After 30 years of highly successful operations, UOSA reclaimed water is an increasingly important component of the drinking water supply strategy for the Washington metropolitan area.

== Initial Construction ==
The expanded sewage plant was constructed over the strenuous objections of many residents, leading to a public debate known cheekily as the "Third Battle of Manassas" in reference to the American Civil War battles known as First and Second Manassas.
