= Cameron Run =

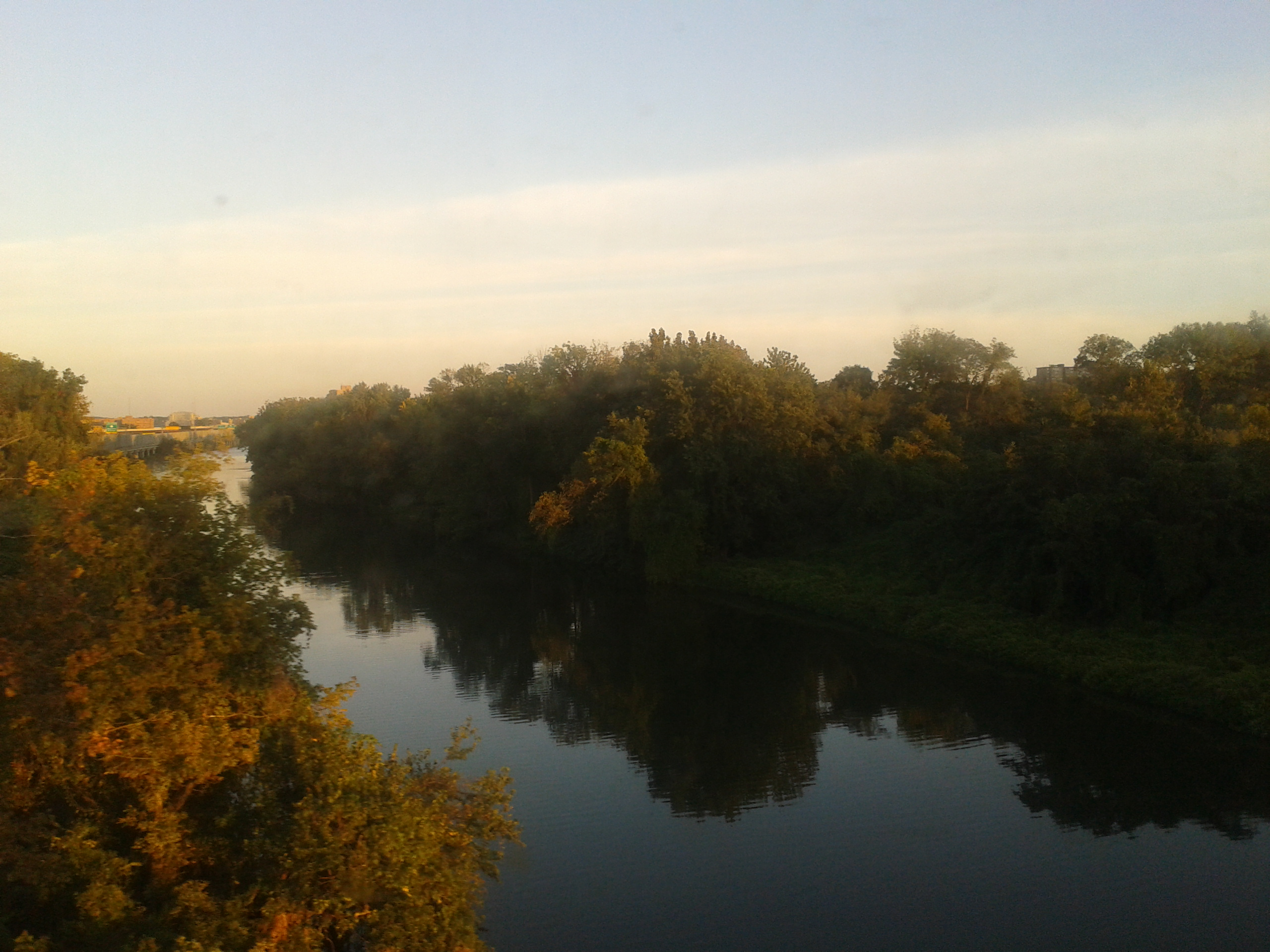
- Cameron Run seen from the Yellow Line of the Washington Metro, looking downriver towards the Potomac

Location
- Country: United States
- Location: Virginia

Physical characteristics
- Mouth
  - location: Hunting Creek
  - coordinates: 38°47′31″N 77°03′22″W
- Length: 3.0 mi (4.8 km)

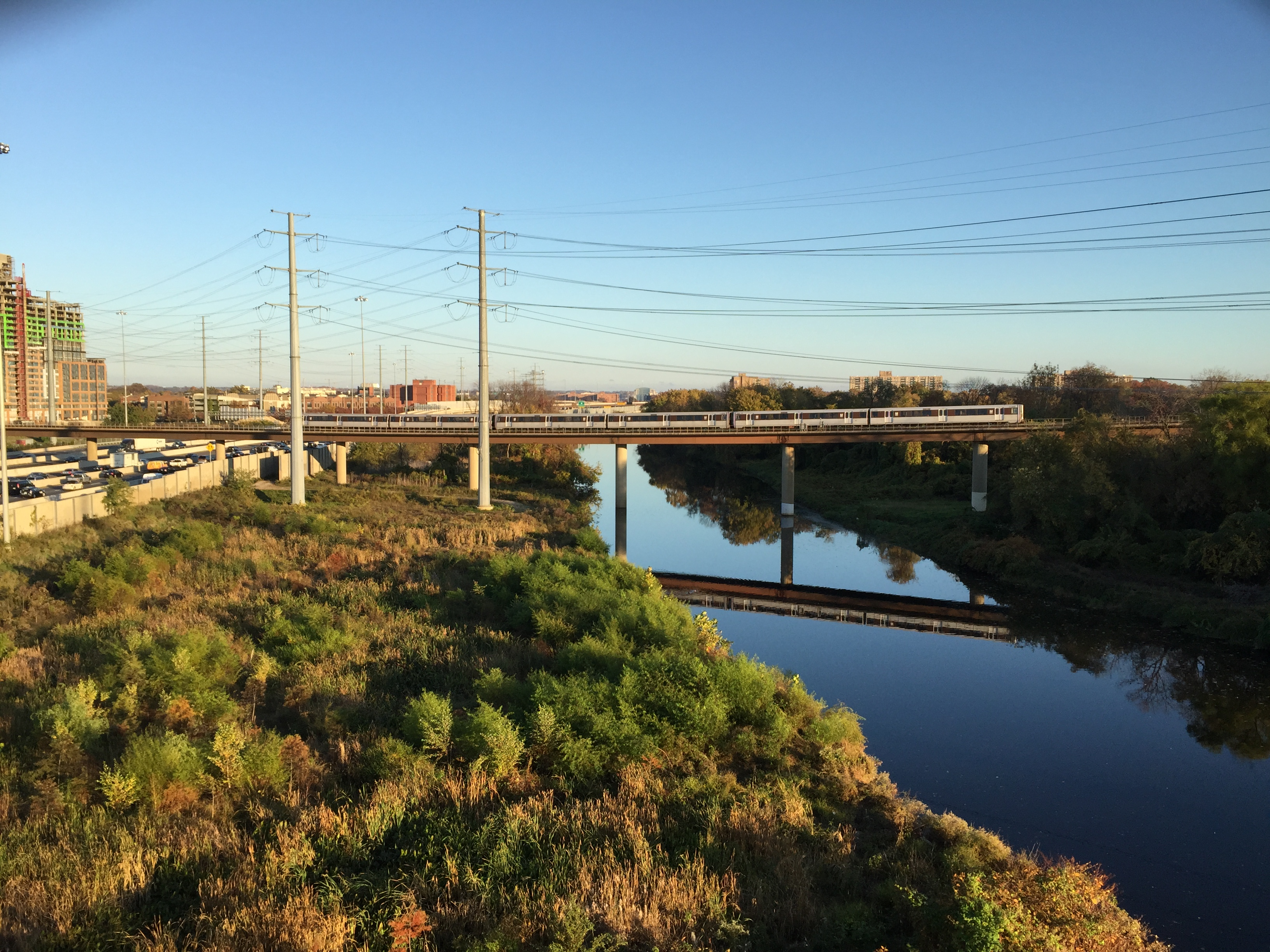
Washington Metro Yellow Line bridge over Cameron Run

Cameron Run is a 3.0-mile-long (4.8 km) tributary stream of the Potomac River, located in the U.S. state of Virginia. A third-order stream, it is formed by the confluence of Backlick Run and Holmes Run. It flows eastward from Alexandria and forms the border between Fairfax County and Alexandria before opening into Hunting Creek and then into the Potomac River. The lower course near Eisenhower Avenue is largely channelized and flows just north of the Capital Beltway until it crosses under it near Telegraph Road The lower 1 mile (1.6 km) or so is tidal and was navigable in colonial times. Cameron Run Regional Park, a water park, lies along a portion of the stream. Cameron Run is part of the Cameron Run Watershed, which encompasses a total of 44 square miles (110 km^{2}) in Northern Virginia (33 square miles (85 km^{2}) in Fairfax County). The Watershed is made up of eight subwatersheds: Tripps Run, Upper Holmes Run, Lower Holmes Run, Turkeycock Run, Backlick Run, Indian Run, Pike Branch, and Cameron Run and its tributaries.

== Flooding concerns ==
Cameron Run flooded in 2000 and again in 2006, devastating some of the low-lying parts of Huntington. Due to increased development in the watershed, peak water flows have increased. Too much sediment from the stream, some of it from the Woodrow Wilson Bridge project (begun in 1999), has reduced the depth of the channel, causing flooding problems. Local governments and the U.S. Army Corps of Engineers are working on a solution. In November 2012, voters in Fairfax County approved a $30 million bond referendum to fund construction of a levee and pump station to prevent flooding in the Huntington neighborhood adjacent to Cameron Run. Initial work on the levee system began in January 2014, with primary levee construction was begun January 2017 and is expected to be completed Spring 2019.

== See also ==
- List of crossings of Cameron Run
- List of rivers of Virginia
- Lake Barcroft
