= Fairfax County Water Authority =

Fairfax County Water Authority (FCWA or more recently Fairfax Water for short) is the main water company in the Northern Virginia region of the United States, and one of the four major water providers in the Washington, D.C. metropolitan area (the other three being Virginia American Water, the Washington Aqueduct and the Washington Suburban Sanitary Commission). Fairfax Water serves most of the populated areas of Fairfax County, and also serves neighboring communities of Alexandria, Prince William County, Virginia and Loudoun County, Virginia through an interconnection with Virginia American Water, which purchases water through wholesale agreements. It serves drinking water to 1.5 million people.

FCWA does not provide sanitary sewer service; this is left to the individual jurisdictions it serves.

== History ==
FCWA traces its history back to the 1950s. At the time, Fairfax County was a mostly rural county that was quickly becoming suburban, and was served by a number of small, privately owned water companies and private wells. This posed a problem in the first half of the decade, as hot summers and increased demand often caused the wells to run dry. The Alexandria Water Company, which served Alexandria, Virginia and its immediate suburbs, had opened a treatment plant on the Occoquan River near Occoquan, Virginia in 1954, but even that wasn't enough, and both the county government and the city of Alexandria were looking for a solution to the problem together.

Fairfax became interested in buying the Annandale Water Company, a medium-sized utility in the heart of Fairfax that, by 1955, served about 3000 homes at the time and had severe problems with water supply. Alexandria was interested in buying Alexandria Water (a privately owned system controlled by American Water Works Company) and its Virginia Water subsidiary, citing its own water supply problems. By the end of the summer, Fairfax was ready to buy the Annandale system when they were blocked from doing so by a lawsuit from a group of subscribers, who were upset that the move may increase their water rates.

FCWA has since expanded its filtration capacity several times, with the introduction of new plants at Lorton and Occoquan in the 1960s, and a new plant near Herndon, Virginia in 1982, the Corbalis plant, celebrating 40 years of operation in 2022. The Griffith plant in Lorton, Virginia opened in 2006. Fairfax Water and Vulcan Materials have entered an agreement to construct a reservoir in Lorton, a phased project expected to be completed by 2085.

== See also ==
- Upper Occoquan Sewage Authority
