= Cameron Run Regional Park =

Park in Alexandria, Virginia, US

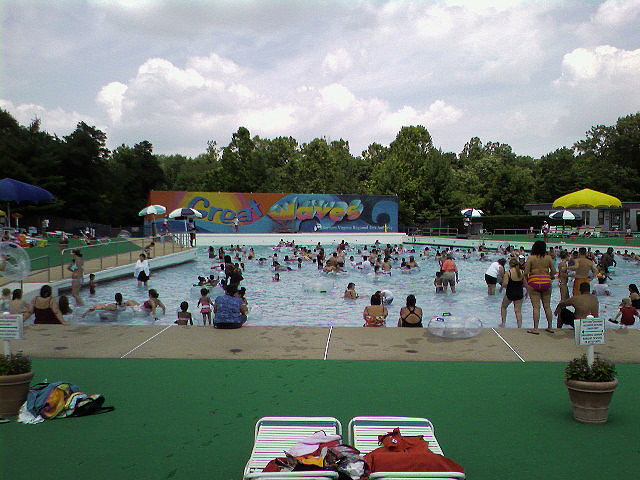
- Great Waves Water Park in Cameron Run Regional Park, 2004

- Location within Alexandria Location within Northern Virginia Location within Virginia Location within the United States
- Interactive map of Cameron Run Regional Park
- Location: Alexandria, Virginia
- Coordinates: 38°48′18″N 77°06′07″W
- Operator: NOVA Parks
- Website: www.nvrpa.org/park/cameron_run/

Cameron Run Regional Park is a regional park located on Eisenhower Avenue, near Cameron Run, in Alexandria, northern Virginia.

It is protected and operated by the NOVA Parks agency of Northern Virginia, formerly the Northern Virginia Regional Park Authority.

== Features ==
The park features batting cages, a full 18 hole miniature golf course, and a waterpark.

The waterpark, known as Great Waves, has a wave pool, a toddlers pool, and water slides.

In the summer the waterpark is open, then it closes for the fall and reopens for the Ice and Lights program which includes ice skating and holiday lights.

Additionally there is a picnic shelter available for rent.

== See also ==
- NOVA Parks system
- Regional parks in Virginia
