= Occoquan River =

Tributary of the Potomac River in Northern Virginia

Occoquan River Tributary to Potomac River
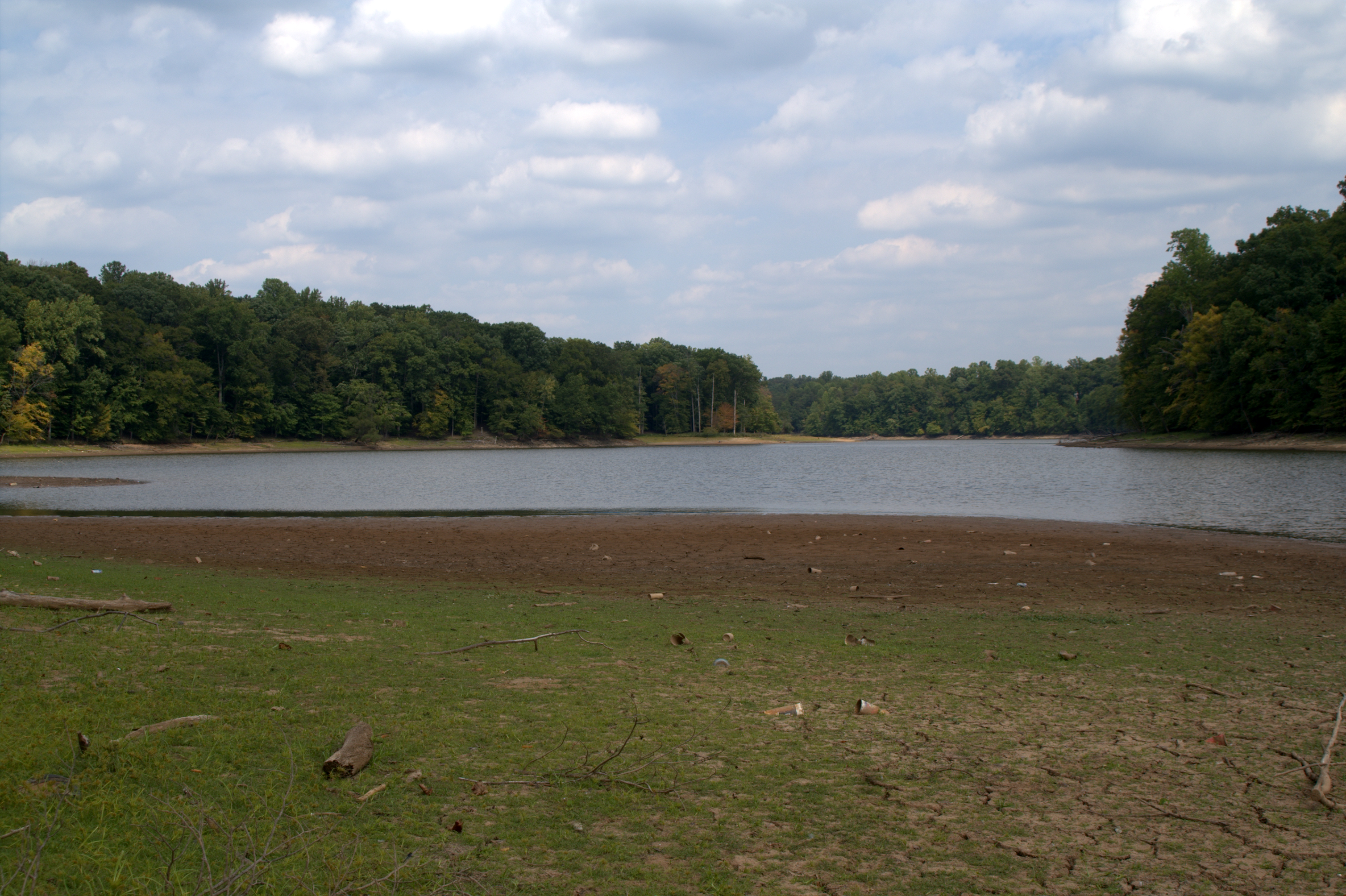
- Occoquan River near Fountainhead Regional Park

Location
- Country: United States
- State: Virginia
- County: Fairfax; Prince William
- Town: Occoquan

Physical characteristics
- Source: confluence of Broad Run and Cedar Run
  - location: Brentsville, Virginia
  - coordinates: 38°41′17″N 077°29′19″W
  - elevation: 149 ft (45 m)
- Mouth: Potomac River
  - location: Belmont Bay, about 2 miles southeast of Woodbridge, Virginia
  - coordinates: 38°39′15″N 077°13′34″W
  - elevation: 0 ft (0 m)
- Length: 26.81 mi (43.15 km)
- Basin size: 616.11 square miles (1,595.7 km^{2})
- Discharge
  - location: Potomac River
  - average: 775.94 cu ft/s (21.972 m^{3}/s) at mouth with Potomac River

Basin features
- Progression: northeast then southeast
- River system: Potomac River
- Tributaries
  - left: Broad Run, Piney Branch, Cabin Run, Bull Run, Wolf Run, Stillwell Run, Sandy Run, Elkhorn Run, Massey Creek
  - right: Cedar Run, Purcell Branch, Champs Mill Branch, Crooked Creek, Airport Creek, Hooes Run
- Waterbodies: Lake Jackson; Occoquan Reservoir
- Bridges: VA 234, VA 294, VA 663, VA 123, I-95, US 1

The Occoquan River is a tributary of the Potomac River in Northern Virginia, where it serves as part of the boundary between Fairfax and Prince William counties. The river is a scenic area, and several local high schools and colleges use the river for the sport of rowing.

== Watershed ==
The river is 24.7 miles (39.8 km) long, and its watershed covers about 590 square miles (1,528 km^{2}). It is formed by the confluence of Broad Run and Cedar Run in Prince William County; Bull Run, which forms Prince William County's boundary with Loudoun and the northerly part of Fairfax counties, enters it east-southeast of Manassas, as the Occoquan turns to the southeast. It reaches the Potomac at Belmont Bay. The Occoquan River is part of the Chesapeake Bay watershed. The name Occoquan is derived from a Doeg Algonquian word translated as "at the end of the water".

== History ==
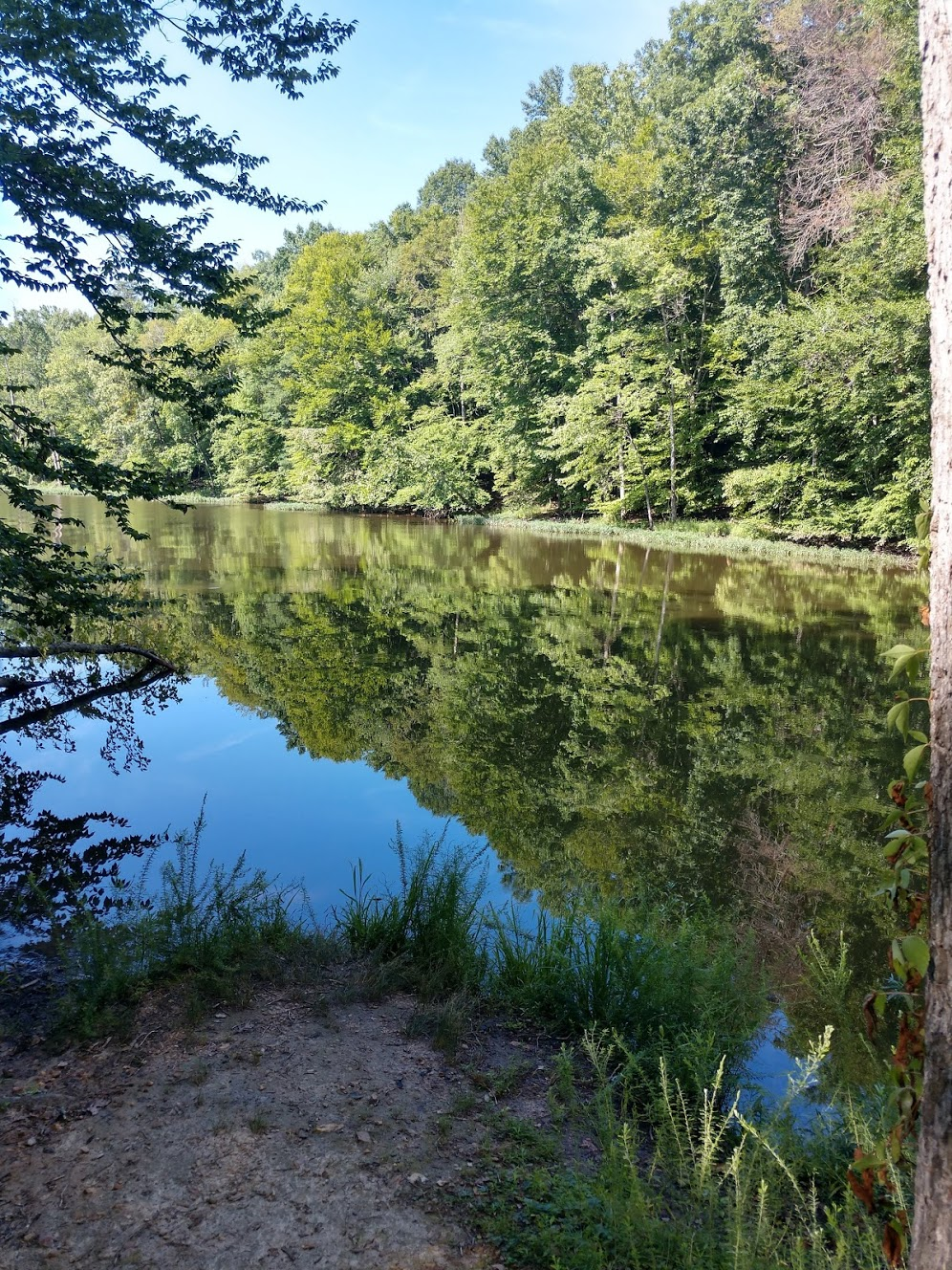
Wolf Run Shoals on the Occoquan.

Geographers, foremost Harm de Blij, defined the river as the most apt border between the American North and American South. Wolf Run Shoals was an important crossing point on the Occoquan between Alexandria and Richmond during the 18th and 19th centuries. It consisted of three islands and a mill, now submerged under the Occoquan due to higher water levels following damming for flood control, water supply, and power generation.

Between c. 1900 and 1976, the Occoquan was frequently called "Occoquan Creek," but a campaign to restore its status as a river was successfully conducted by Rosemary Selecman.

== Dams ==
The Occoquan has three dams along its length. The first is at the town of Occoquan, a reservoir belonging to the Fairfax County Water Authority, which serves as a source of drinking water for parts of Fairfax and Prince William counties. The Occoquan Reservoir stretches from Occoquan to Bull Run. Further upriver is Lake Jackson. The dam that creates Lake Jackson is at Virginia State Route 234, Dumfries Road, and is a former hydroelectric facility. Today the dam contains the lake, but has not produced electricity in several decades. There is a third dam up Broad Run from its confluence with Cedar Run; this dam forms Lake Manassas, which is the primary water supply for the city of Manassas.

== Parks ==
Sandy Run Regional Park is at Fairfax Station and consists of the northeastern arm of the Occoquan Reservoir. The park is used exclusively for the education, practice, and competition of rowing. The high schools who use this park for rowing are members of the Virginia Scholastic Rowing Association (VASRA). The member schools which call this park their home are Robinson Secondary School, W. T. Woodson High School, Thomas Jefferson High School for Science and Technology, James Madison High School, Fairfax High School, Oakton High School, West Springfield High School, Langley High School, Justice High School, and South County Secondary School.

Fountainhead Regional Park is also in Fairfax Station, further upriver from Sandy Run Regional Park, past Bull Run. Lake Braddock Secondary School and Westfield High School, also VASRA members, use the park for rowing.

The Occoquan River is bordered by three parks administered by the Northern Virginia Regional Park Authority. The three parks are Bull Run, Occoquan, and Fountainhead. In addition to horse riding, trailing cycling, fishing and boating access, the Bull Run to Occoquan trail travels through all three parks from the beginning of the river to its end. The Oxford Boathouse hosts Hylton High School, Potomac High School, Gar-Field High School, Forest Park High School, Woodbridge High School, and Colgan High school.

== See also ==
- Upper Occoquan Sewage Authority
- List of rivers of Virginia
