= Virginia State Route 613 (Fairfax County) =

State highway in Virginia, United States

State Route 613

Route information
- Maintained by VDOT
- Length: 10.81 mi (17.40 km)

Major junctions
- South end: SR 611 in Newington
- SR 289 in Franconia; I-95 / I-495 near Alexandria; SR 401 in Alexandria; SR 244 near Lincolnia; US 50 / SR 7 in Seven Corners
- North end: Arlington County line

Location
- Country: United States
- State: Virginia

Highway system
- Virginia Routes; Interstate; US; Primary; Secondary; Byways; History; HOT lanes

State Route 613 (SR 613) in Fairfax County, Virginia is a secondary state highway. The designation includes several distinct suburban surface routes within the county. These routes were once mostly connected, but changes in road alignment, new road construction, and annexations by the independent city of Alexandria have separated them. These routes are signed only sporadically as 613 and local residents usually refer to these routes by their names.

== Route description ==
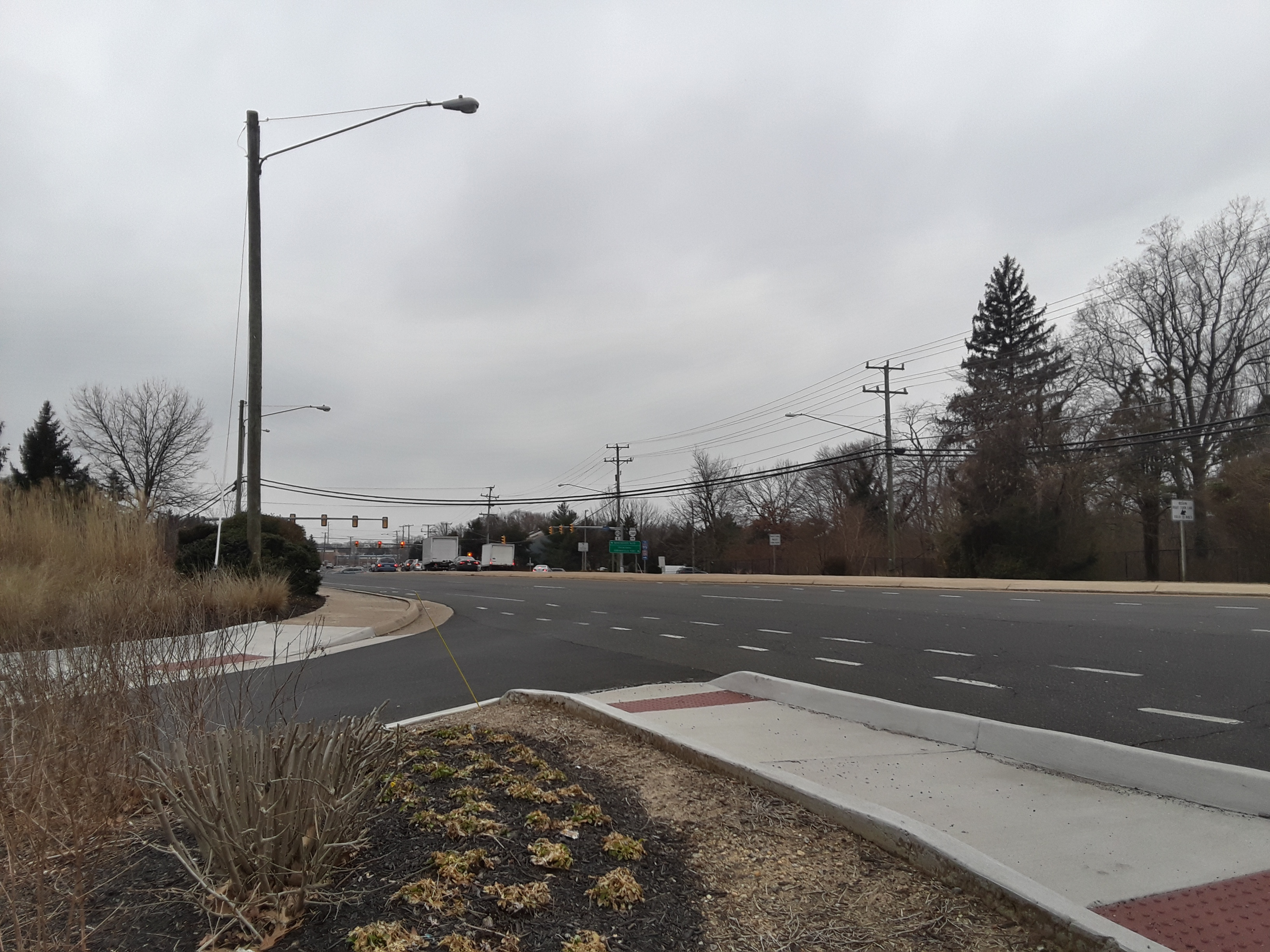
The Beulah Street portion of Virginia State Route 613, looking towards its intersection with the Franconia-Springfield Parkway and Manchester Boulevard

As of 2007, SR 613 is the designation of four distinct routes within Fairfax County. From the north, the first is that of Wilson Boulevard from the Arlington County line to the intersection with State Route 7 (Leesburg Pike) and U.S. Route 50 (Arlington Boulevard) at Seven Corners. SR 613 then continues as Sleepy Hollow Road to a terminus at State Route 244 (Columbia Pike).

The second section is Lincolnia Road for its entire length and begins at an intersection with SR 244 0.75 miles (1.21 km) east of the previous terminus. It continues through an intersection with SR 620 (Braddock Road) to a dead end just before SR 2532 (Beauregard Street) with access only from southbound SR 2532.

The third section begins at the City of Alexandria/Fairfax County line as a continuation of South Van Dorn Street which is designated as State Route 401 within Alexandria. Its original terminus was at SR 644 (Franconia Road) but it was extended to SR 611 (Telegraph Road) in the mid-2000s.

The fourth section is known as Beulah Street for its entire length. It begins at SR 644 (Franconia Road) in Franconia, 0.5 miles (0.80 km) west of the third section's intersection. It continues through intersections with SR 289 (Franconia-Springfield Parkway) and SR 611 (Telegraph Road). Immediately past SR 611, SR 613 continues through Fort Belvoir United States Army installation where traffic is regulated by the Telegraph Gate which, as of 2001, only allows entry from 5:00-21:00 Monday-Friday with military identification card. SR 613 continues through the base, past the Fort Belvoir Golf Club, and intersection with Kingman Road, but is permanently obstructed beyond its intersection with Wills Road at a former gate just before an overpass of a former military railroad spur. This section serves as U.S. Bicycle Route 1 from SR 611 for 0.4 miles (0.64 km) to SR 618 (Woodlawn Road).

The fifth section is less than 0.1-mile (0.16 km) long and is the continuation of Beulah Street from the now obstructed former gate to an intersection with SR 617 (Backlick Road), 0.3 miles (0.48 km) before US 1 (Richmond Highway) in Accotink.

== History ==
The annexation of parts of Fairfax County by Alexandria in the 1950s bifurcated SR 613 into sections to the south and northwest of the annexed land. Before that, the second and third sections of SR 613 described above were one route that was called Lincolnia Road and ran roughly along the current Lincolnia Road, Whiting Road, and South Van Dorn Street (from south of Edsall Road). After the annexation and significant road realignment, the southern parts of Lincolnia Road were severed and given their current names.

== Major intersections ==
Location	mi	km	Destinations	Notes
Newington–Franconia line	0.00	0.00	Telegraph Road (SR 611)	
Franconia	2.02	3.25	SR 289 west / Manchester Boulevard	
Franconia	2.37	3.81	Fleet Road (SR 635)	
Franconia	3.29	5.29	Franconia Road (SR 644)	
Franconia	Gap in route			
Franconia	0.00	0.00	Telegraph Road (SR 611)	
Franconia–Rose Hill line	1.54	2.48	Franconia Road (SR 644)	
Franconia–Rose Hill line	2.20	3.54	I-95 / I-495 (Capital Beltway) – Richmond, Baltimore	
Franconia–Rose Hill– Alexandria tripoint	2.79	4.49	SR 401 north (Van Dorn Street)	Continuation into Alexandria
Gap in route
Lincolnia	0.00	0.00	Beauregard Street	
Lincolnia	0.16	0.26	Chambliss Street (SR 713)	
Lincolnia	1.03	1.66	Braddock Road (SR 620)	
Lincolnia–Annandale– Lake Barcroft tripoint	1.46	2.35	SR 244 (Columbia Pike)	
Gap in route
Annandale–Lake Barcroft line	0.00	0.00	SR 244 (Columbia Pike)	
West Falls Church–Lake Barcroft line	1.58	2.54	Kerns Road (SR 708)	
West Falls Church–Lake Barcroft– Falls Church–Seven Corners quadripoint	2.77	4.46	SR 7 (Leesburg Pike) / Arlington Road to US 50	
Falls Church–Seven Corners– Arlington tripoint	3.27	5.26	Wilson Road	End of state maintenance; continuation into Arlington
1.000 mi = 1.609 km; 1.000 km = 0.621 mi
