= Occoquan Reservoir =

- Location within Virginia Location within the United States
- Location: Fairfax County and Prince William County, Virginia, U.S.
- Coordinates: 38°41′39″N 77°16′35″W
- Type: reservoir
- Basin countries: United States
- Surface area: 2,100-acre (850 ha)
- Surface elevation: 121 ft (37 m)

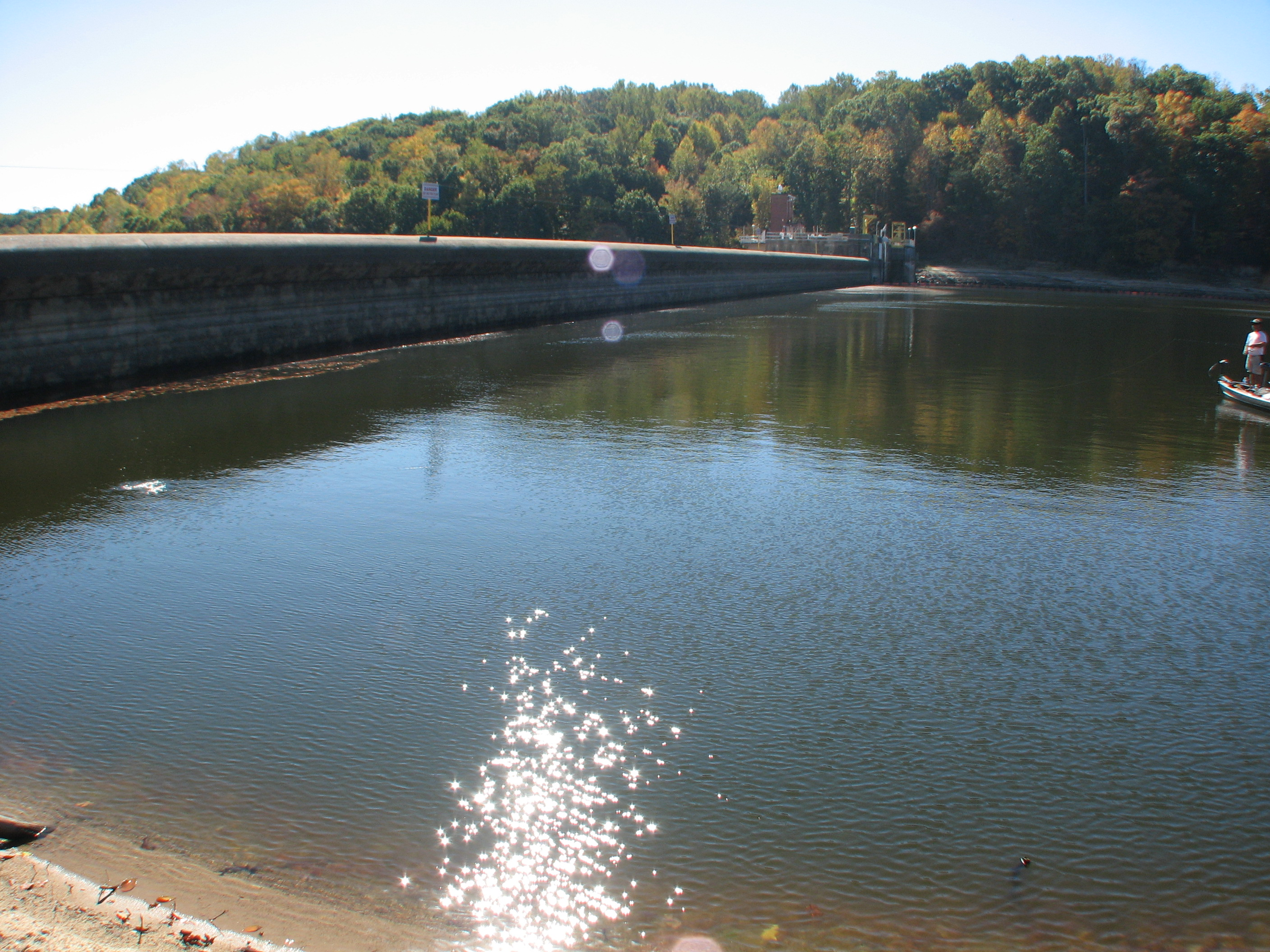
Occoquan Dam

Occoquan Reservoir is a 2,100-acre (850 ha) reservoir in northeast Virginia, southwest of Washington, D.C., straddling part of the boundary between Fairfax and Prince William Counties, west of Alexandria. It is formed by the Occoquan Dam on the Occoquan River .

Managed by the Fairfax County Water Authority, it provides an important water supply to surrounding settlements in northern Virginia, with an output of 17 million US gallons a day (64,000 m^{3}/d) to 1.2 million people, including over half of the population of Prince William County. The Occoquan Reservoir is officially under Prince William County, despite being on the border with Fairfax County. The major drainages tributary to the Occoquan Reservoir can be divided into two principal sub-basins: Bull Run and Occoquan Creek.

Despite being a major fresh water source, Occoquan Reservoir is listed on Virginia's Dirty Water List, with recorded high levels of phosphorus, turbidity, low dissolved oxygen, the presence of copper sulfate and the growing presence of pharmaceuticals, largely due to human land uses, population pressure and poor management.

In 1968, the Virginia State Water Control Board (SWCB) commissioned a study of the Occoquan Reservoir and its tributary streams to draw up a plan of sustainable management for the reservoir. A 1970 analysis stated that the reservoir was "highly eutrophic...", and further, that "the sewage plant effluents are mainly responsible for the advanced stage of eutrophication occurring...". As a result, in 1971, A Policy for Waste Treatment and Water Quality Management in the Occoquan Watershed was approved by the SWCB.

== Recreation ==
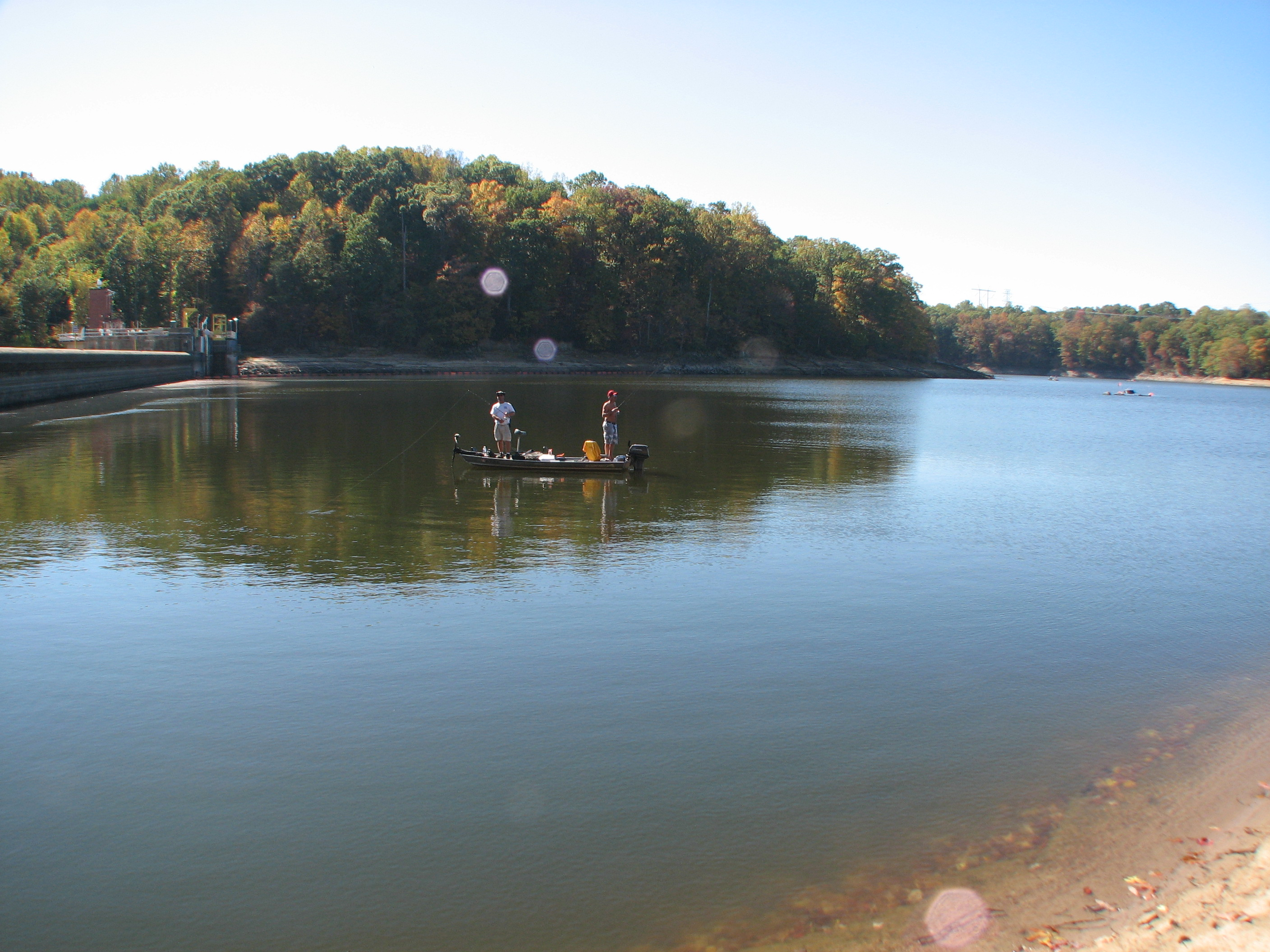
Boating on the reservoir

The reservoir can be accessed by Interstate 95, which has attracted fishing recreational activities on the lake since 1961. Largemouth bass, bluegill, black and white crappie, channel catfish, flathead catfish, northern pike, and white perch are fished on the lake despite some pollution problems. The Occoquan Boat Club (OBC), founded in 1979 by Rick Evans, is a major boating club located on the reservoir, organizing rowing, sponsoring crew races, sending teams to regattas, and advocating rowing in Northern Virginia. The OBC has 180 members and has over 19 shells, recognizable by their red and black striping on the bow. The club operates singles, doubles, sweep fours and sculling quads rowing sessions on the lake.
