= Hunting Creek =

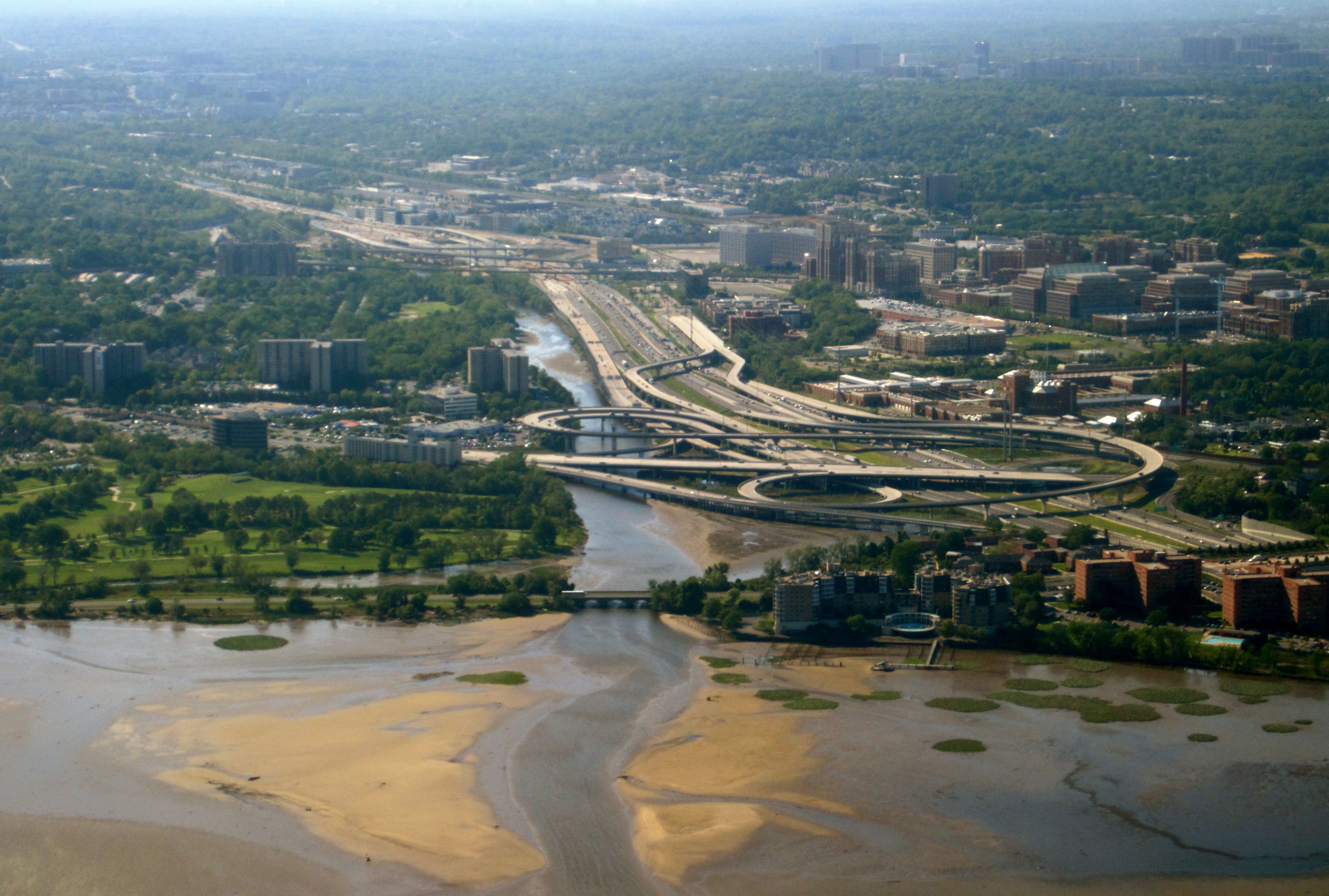
- Hunting Creek from the east in 2010; Alexandria on right

- Location within Alexandria Location within Virginia Location within the United States

Location
- Country: United States
- State: Virginia
- Region: Fairfax County and Alexandria

Physical characteristics
- Source
  - coordinates: 38°47′33″N 77°3′27″W
- Mouth
  - location: Potomac River
  - coordinates: 38°47′22.84″N 77°3′2.42″W
  - elevation: 0 feet (0 m)

Basin features
- Waterbodies: Cameron Run, Potomac River
- GNIS feature ID: 1478802

Hunting Creek is a cove and tributary stream of the Potomac River between the City of Alexandria and Fairfax County in Virginia. It is formed by Cameron Run flowing from the west. The community of Huntington takes its name from the creek. Jones Point forms the north side. Dyke Marsh is just to the south. The George Washington Memorial Parkway and Mount Vernon Trail cross it on a bridge.

The creek is sometimes referred to as "Great Hunting Creek", to distinguish it from Little Hunting Creek.

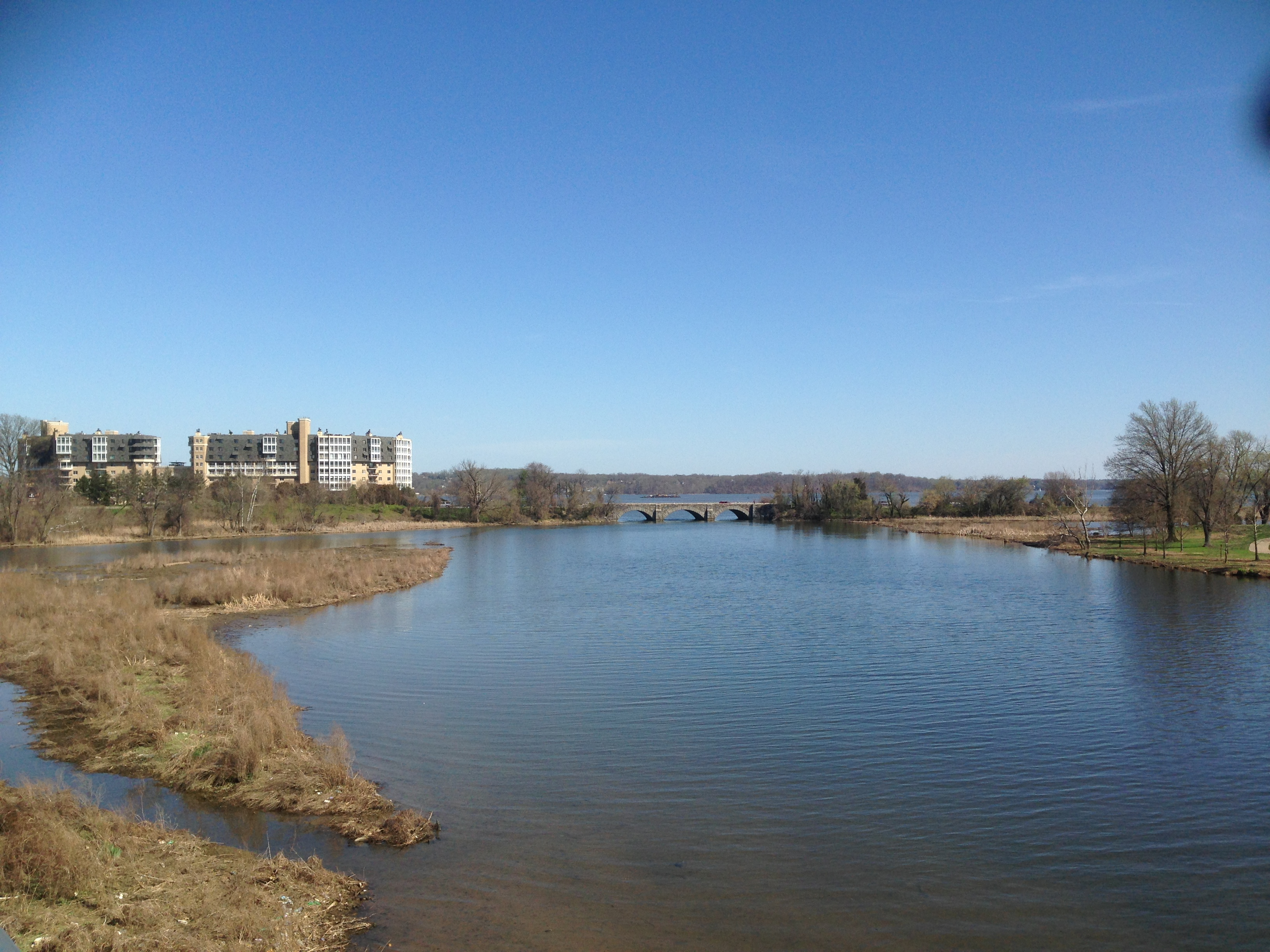
Hunting Creek from the west in 2015

== See also ==
- List of rivers of Virginia
