= Lake Barcroft, Virginia =

- Census-designated place
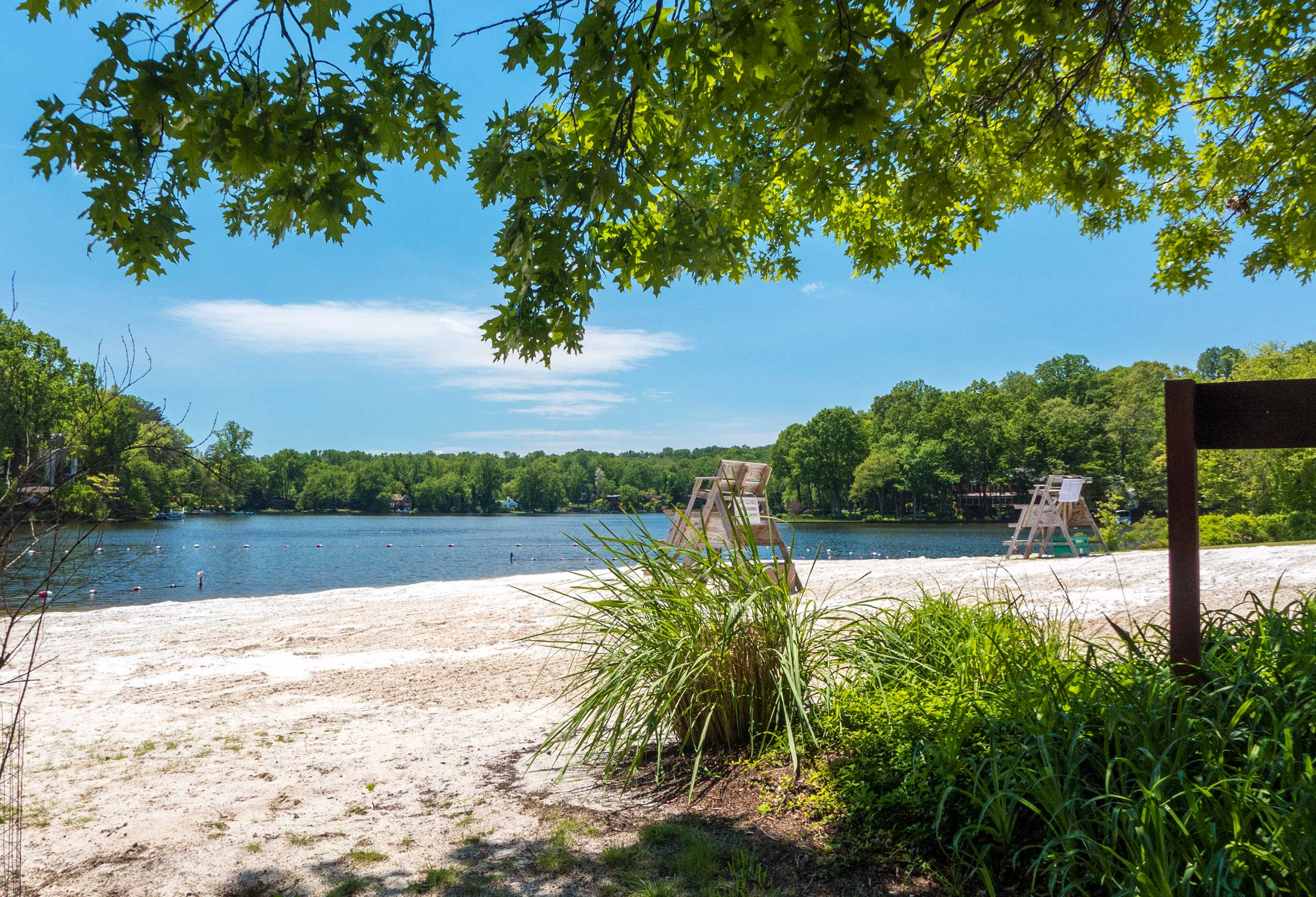
- View over Lake Barcroft from Beach 4

- Location of Lake Barcroft in Fairfax County, Virginia

- Location within Northern Virginia Location within Virginia Location within the United States
- Coordinates: 38°51′5″N 77°9′20″W
- Country: United States
- State: Virginia
- County: Fairfax

Area
  - Total: 2.7 sq mi (6.9 km^{2})
  - Land: 2.4 sq mi (6.3 km^{2})
  - Water: 0.23 sq mi (0.6 km^{2})
- Elevation: 260 ft (80 m)

Population (2020)
  - Total: 9,770
  - Density: 3,918/sq mi (1,512.8/km^{2})
- Time zone: UTC−5 (Eastern (EST))
  - Summer (DST): UTC−4 (EDT)
- FIPS code: 51-43352
- GNIS feature ID: 1492515

Lake Barcroft is a census-designated place (CDP) in Fairfax County, Virginia, United States. As of the 2020 census, Lake Barcroft had a population of 9,770. It is also the name of the privately owned lake—part of the Cameron Run Watershed—around which this population is located. The lake is named for Dr. John W. Barcroft, who owned and operated a mill on Holmes Run during the mid-19th century.

== History ==
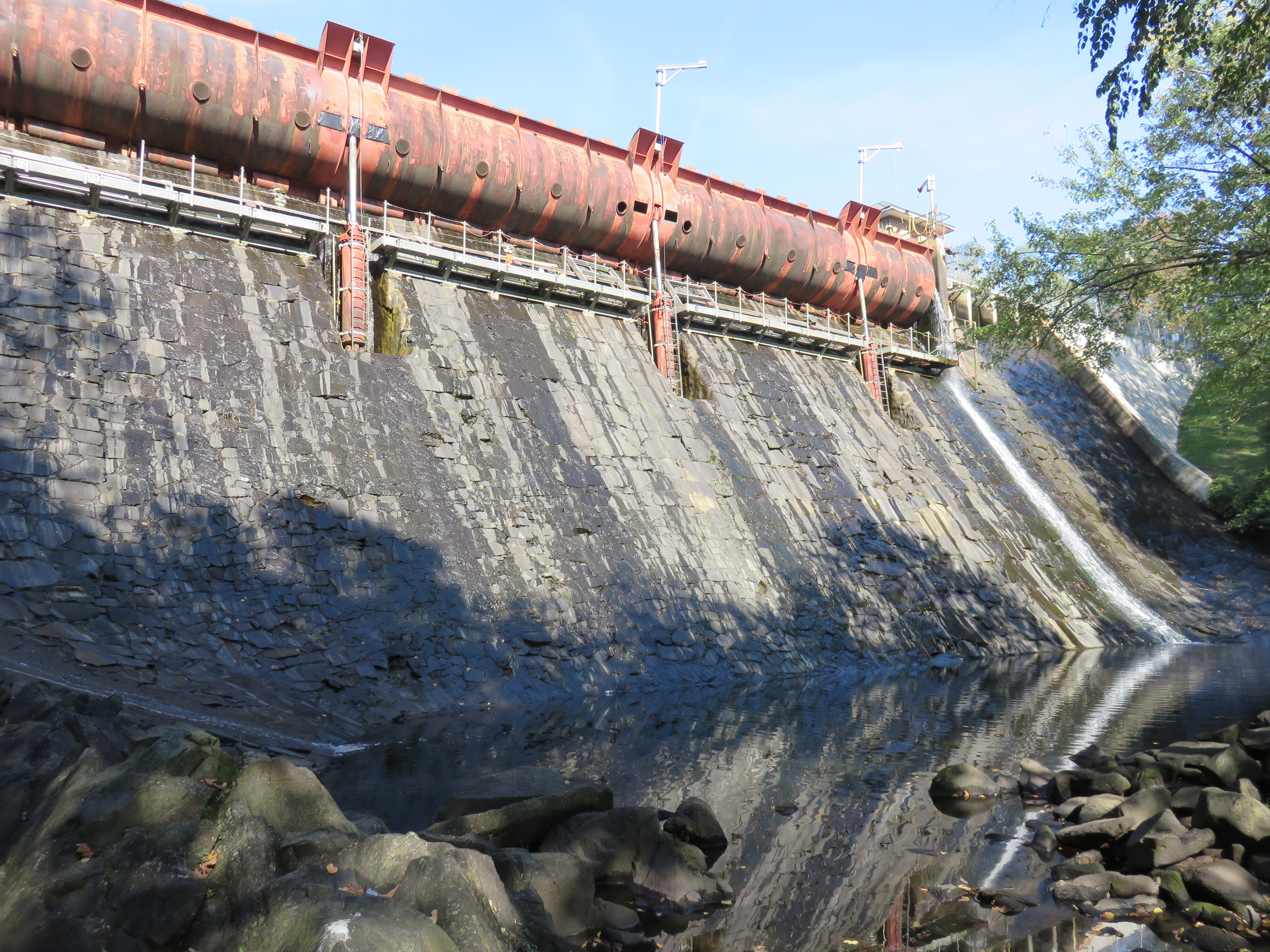
The masonry dam across Holmes Run that creates Barcroft Lake, Fairfax County, Virginia, 22 October 2017

In 1913, the Alexandria Water Company began construction of the Lake Barcroft Dam on Holmes Run to create a drinking water reservoir for the city of Alexandria. Construction of the dam was completed in 1915, putting a 620 million-gallon reservoir into service. In 1942, the company installed 24 gates at the top of the dam to raise the spillway elevation five feet, increasing the reservoir size to 800 million gallons.

In 1949, the City of Alexandria began to draw its drinking water from the Occoquan Reservoir. A year later, Colonel Joseph Barger and Associates purchased the reservoir, dam, and 680 adjacent acres of land for $1 million from the Alexandria Water Company. A year later, Barger and Associates began developing the 680 acres (2.8 km^{2}) into a residential community. During the early 1950s, residents formed a homeowners association called the Lake Barcroft Community Association (LABARCA). In 1970, community residents purchased the lake, dam, and common grounds for $300,000, and established the Barcroft Lake Management Association (BARLAMA).

In 1972, Hurricane Agnes passed over the area. The hurricane caused so much rain that the lake level rose above the top of the dam by 3 feet (0.91 m). This resulted in the lake overflowing and eroding the western, earthen shoulder of the dam. The rush of water deepened the washout, but the slow erosion protected downstream interests from the wall of water that would have resulted from a total dam collapse.

To restore the dam and lake, residents voted to establish the Lake Barcroft Watershed Improvement District (LBWID) to set up a taxing authority to fund repairs. The LBWID is a quasi-governmental entity headed by three state-appointed trustees who are residents of Lake Barcroft. The lake was dry for two years during the early 1970s while the damaged dam was rebuilt. A new gate improved the operation of the dam and is now fully automatic. The dam meets all Commonwealth dam safety requirements.

The Lake Barcroft Association (LBA) came into being in 1992 when LABARCA and BARLAMA joined up into one private entity. Lake Barcroft has excellent fishing. Largemouth bass, catfish, sunfish and a rare (non-stinging) fresh water jellyfish all inhabit Lake Barcroft. Ospreys, fishing birds of prey, are now on the lake as well.

== Geography ==
Lake Barcroft is located in eastern Fairfax County at 38°51′5″N 77°9′20″W (38.851412, −77.155654). It is bordered to the northeast by Seven Corners, to the east by Bailey's Crossroads, to the south by Lincolnia, to the southwest by Annandale, and to the northwest by West Falls Church. Downtown Washington, D.C. is 9 miles (14 km) to the northeast. The CDP border follows Sleepy Hollow Road to the west, Leesburg Pike to the north, various roads along its border with Bailey's Crossroads to the east, and Columbia Pike to the south.

According to the United States Census Bureau, the Lake Barcroft CDP has a total area of 2.7 square miles (6.9 km^{2}), of which 2.4 square miles (6.3 km^{2}) is land and 0.2 square miles (0.6 km^{2}), or 8.34%, is water.

The local high school is Justice High School.

The boundaries of the Lake Barcroft CDP are somewhat more expansive than those of the LBA. The former includes several apartment buildings, condominiums, and businesses along the streets that form the border. The latter includes exclusively single family homes.

== Demographics ==
=== 2020 census ===
Lake Barcroft CDP, Virginia – Racial and ethnic composition Note: the US Census treats Hispanic/Latino as an ethnic category. This table excludes Latinos from the racial categories and assigns them to a separate category. Hispanics/Latinos may be of any race.
Race / Ethnicity (NH = Non-Hispanic)	Pop 2000	Pop 2010	Pop 2020	% 2000	% 2010	% 2020
White alone (NH)	5,993	5,831	5,463	67.29%	61.01%	55.92%
Black or African American alone (NH)	425	474	773	4.77%	4.96%	7.91%
Native American or Alaska Native alone (NH)	12	10	20	0.13%	0.10%	0.20%
Asian alone (NH)	852	1,087	1,140	9.57%	11.37%	11.67%
Native Hawaiian or Pacific Islander alone (NH)	4	3	5	0.04%	0.03%	0.05%
Other race alone (NH)	14	64	51	0.16%	0.67%	0.52%
Mixed race or Multiracial (NH)	295	292	456	3.31%	3.06%	4.67%
Hispanic or Latino (any race)	1,311	1,797	1,862	14.72%	18.80%	19.06%
Total	8,906	9,558	9,770	100.00%	100.00%	100.00%

=== 2000 census ===
As of the census of 2000, there were 8,906 people, 3,589 households, and 2,415 families residing in the CDP. The population density was 3,602.5 inhabitants per square mile (1,390.9/km^{2}). There were 3,673 housing units at an average density of 1,485.7 per square mile (573.6/km^{2}). The racial makeup of the CDP was 75.98% White, 9.59% Asian, 4.92% African American, 4.84% from other races, 4.35% from two or more races, 0.26% Native American, and 0.07% Pacific Islander.

Hispanics or Latinos (who may be of any race) were 14.72% of the population.

There were 3,589 households out of which 26.9% had children under the age of 18 living with them, 56.9% were married couples living together, 7.1% had a female householder with no husband present, and 32.7% were non-families. 26.0% of all households were made up of individuals and 9.1% had someone living alone who was 65 years of age or older. The average household size was 2.48 and the average family size was 2.97.

In the CDP, the population was spread out with 20.5% under the age of 18, 5.3% from 18 to 24, 29.8% from 25 to 44, 28.2% from 45 to 64, and 16.1% who were 65 years of age or older. The median age was 42 years. For every 100 females, there were 95.1 males. For every 100 females age 18 and over, there were 92.7 males.

The median income for a household in the CDP was $83,593, and the median income for a family was $101,562. Males had a median income of $62,882 versus $52,284 for females. The per capita income for the CDP was $46,293. About 2.7% of families and 3.4% of the population were below the poverty line, including 2.3% of those under age 18 and 0.8% of those age 65 or over.

== Management of the lake ==
Lake Barcroft is privately owned, and managed by the Lake Barcroft Association (LBA); the current homeowners' association. Property owners on the lake and the immediate areas around the lake are bound by a restrictive covenant that also gives them rights to use the lake for recreation. For homeowners who do not own riparian land, there are five private sand beaches and a community park owned by LBA to permit access to the water. All common property is open to people living within the boundaries of the association and their authorized guests. The Lake Barcroft Association employs seasonal lifeguards to protect its beaches during the summer months.

The residents organize occasional aquatic festivals, most notably Independence Day fireworks every July 4. Fireworks are fired from one of the beaches, and residents crowd the water in their electric-powered or paddled boats to watch. The Labor Day games are held at two of its beaches to close the summer swimming season.

Internal combustion engines are prohibited on the lake to prevent noise and pollution. Only the lifeguards have access to gas-powered motorboats. Most residents own a small sailboat, canoe, or an electrically powered boat.

== Ecology of the lake ==
Lake Barcroft is home to many freshwater species of fish and invertebrate. Largemouth bass were introduced to the lake decades ago, and now the population is self-sustaining. Catfish and bluegill also live in the lake in large numbers. Bryozoa can be observed just below the surface on the edges and in the shallower areas of the lake. Semi-aquatic species such as muskrat, ducks, Canada geese and kingfishers are also common.

As part of the Cameron Run Watershed, the lake receives large amounts of runoff from adjacent parts of suburban Fairfax County. These cause occasional algal blooms. The microbiology of the lake is monitored, and it is considered safe for fishing and swimming.
