= Virginia State Route 611 (Fairfax County) =

Secondary state highway in Virginia, United States

State Route 611

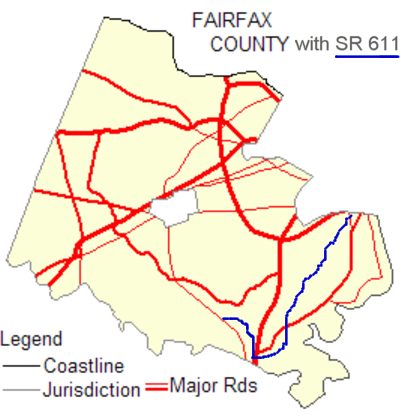

Route information
- Maintained by VDOT
- Length: 17.07 mi (27.47 km) Telegraph Rd. 9.16 mi. Old Colchester Rd. 3.85 mi. Furnace Rd. 4.06 mi.
- Tourist routes: Virginia Byway

Major junctions
- Northeast end: SR 241 to I-95 / I-495 / SR 236 near Alexandria
- SR 286 / Fairfax County Parkway in Newington US 1 in Fort Belvoir / Lorton US 1 in Lorton
- Southwest end: SR 123 in Lorton

Location
- Country: United States
- State: Virginia

Highway system
- Virginia Routes; Interstate; US; Primary; Secondary; Byways; History; HOT lanes

State Route 611 in Fairfax County, Virginia is a secondary state highway which traverses the eastern portion of the county. SR 611 provides a major artery for commuters, connecting the Eisenhower Valley section of Alexandria with Lorton and points south along US 1. SR 611 is known by three names: Telegraph Road, Old Colchester Road, and Furnace Road.

== Route description ==
=== Telegraph Road ===
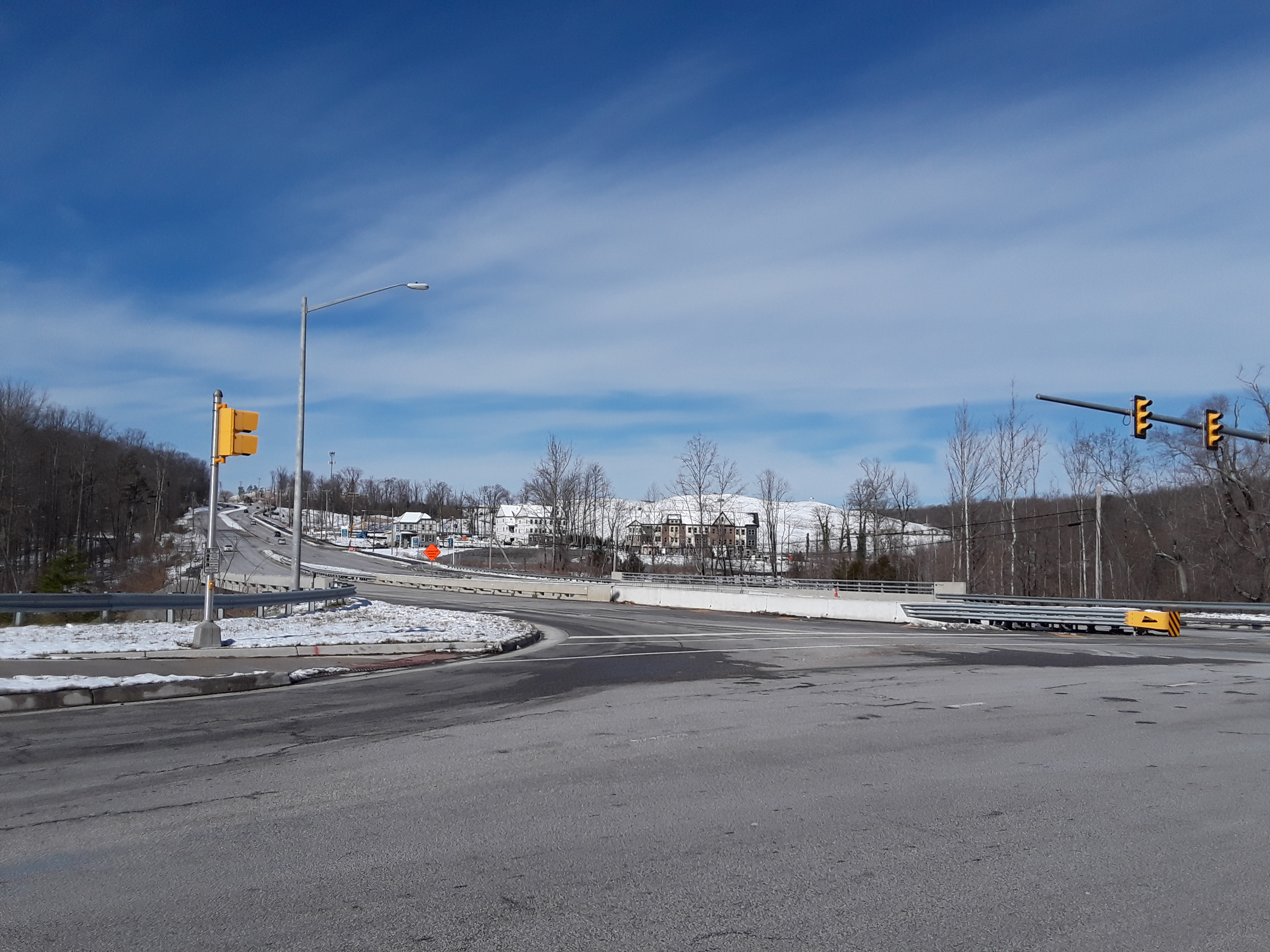
Telegraph Road at its intersection with Jeff Todd Way, after a late March snowstorm in 2018

SR 611 starts as Telegraph Road at an intersection with SR 241, North Kings Highway, near Alexandria. North of this intersection Telegraph Road intersects with the Capital Beltway (I-95 and I-495), and SR 236 (Duke Street). Telegraph Road starts as a six-lane divided highway, passing a short commercial section and a residential section. When Telegraph Road passes SR 644 (Franconia Road), it reduces to four lanes divided, and gradually reduces from there to two lanes undivided.

Shortly before SR 611 intersects with SR 633 (South Kings Highway), it intersects with SR 1635 (Rose Hill Drive). Across from this intersection is the entrance to Lee District Park. As Telegraph Road approaches South Kings Highway it passes Greendale Golf Course to the northwest. As SR 611 approaches SR 613 (Beulah Street), it widens to four lanes divided. Throughout most of the route from SR 635 (Hayfield Road) to the Fairfax County Parkway it forms the northernmost boundary of Fort Belvoir.

After intersecting with the Fairfax County Parkway, Telegraph Road gradually turns to the south and passes by an industrialized area. It ends at an intersection with US 1 (Richmond Highway).

=== Old Colchester Road ===
On the other side of US 1, SR 611 becomes Old Colchester Road. Almost immediately it reduces to two lanes undivided. Shortly after this point it passes the rear side of the Noman M. Cole, Jr., Pollution Control Plant, which empties its treated water into nearby Pohick Creek. Old Colchester Road then crosses Pohick Creek, and soon after intersects with SR 242, Gunston Road. From there Old Colchester Road heads toward the Occoquan River. It first intersects with Furnace Road. One must turn west to stay on SR 611.

=== Furnace Road ===
Furnace Road starts out as a two lane undivided road. It crosses under railroad tracks owned by CSX Transportation through a one-lane underpass. The road curves and is parallel with US 1, then turns and intersects with that road.

On the other side of US 1, Furnace Road is four-lanes divided until an underpass with I-95, where it reduces to two lanes undivided. As it heads north, Furnace Road passes the I-95 Landfill (run by Fairfax County) to the west and a private landfill area to the east. The road turns slightly to the west and joins SR 642, Lorton Road at a Y intersection. Shortly after, the two routes diverge in another Y intersection. SR 611 heads to the west, and ends at an intersection with SR 123, Ox Road.

== History ==
=== Old Colchester Road ===
Old Colchester Road used to be a road leading to the seaport of Colchester, Virginia, which was on the banks of the Occoquan River near the Potomac River. Silt filled up the Occoquan River, making Colchester untenable as a seaport. Alexandria, Virginia became the major seaport in the area, taking the place of Colchester. The result was that Old Colchester Road became a minor road, and much later was incorporated into SR 611 (Fairfax County).

=== Furnace Road ===
Furnace Road largely borders the old Lorton Reformatory property to the east. Part of that property has become Fairfax County's I-95 Landfill. The area to the east of the I-95 Landfill is owned by Waste Management is known as Lorton Landfill Two large tracts south of the landfill are destined to become Northern Virginia Regional Park Authority parkland, although right now (January 2010) they are just wooded land. North of the landfill is a tract that is destined to be parkland run by the Fairfax County Park Authority, although it, too, is just a wooded piece of land.

== Major intersections ==
The entire route is in Fairfax County.

Location	mi	km	Destinations	Notes
Alexandria	0.00	0.00	SR 241 (Telegraph Road/North Kings Highway) to I-95 / I-495 / SR 236 – Alexandria, Huntington	
Rose Hill	0.44	0.71	SR 644 (Franconia Road) – Springfield	
Rose Hill	3.13	5.04	SR 633 (South Kings Highway) – Alexandria, Huntington	
Franconia	3.33	5.36	SR 613 (South Van Dorn Street)	
Franconia	4.56	7.34	SR 635 (Hayfield Road)	
Franconia	6.12	9.85	SR 613 (Beulah Street) – Alexandria, Fort Belvoir	
Newington	7.80	12.55	SR 286 (Fairfax County Parkway) – Springfield, Reston	Interchange
Newington	9.16	14.74	US 1 (Richmond Highway) – Richmond, Washington, DC	
Lorton	11.04	17.77	SR 242 (Gunston Road) – Lorton	
Lorton	13.38	21.53	US 1 (Richmond Highway) – Alexandria, Richmond	
Lorton	15.92	25.62	SR 642 (Lorton Road)	Northern terminus of concurrency with SR 642
Lorton	16.35	26.31	SR 642 (Workhouse Road) to SR 123 south	Southern terminus of concurrency with SR 642
Lorton	16.86	27.13	SR 636 (Hooes Road) to SR 123 south – Springfield	
Lorton	17.07	27.47	SR 123 north	Southern terminus of SR 611; no access to SR 123 south
1.000 mi = 1.609 km; 1.000 km = 0.621 mi: Concurrency terminus; Incomplete access
