= VA242 =

VA242 may refer to:

- Ariane flight VA242, an Ariane 5 launch that occurred on 5 April 2018
- Virgin Australia flight 242, with IATA flight number VA242
- Virginia State Route 242 (VA-242), a primary state highway in the United States
