= Virginia State Route 241 =

State highway in northern Virginia, US

State Route 241

Route information
- Maintained by VDOT
- Length: 1.88 mi (3.03 km)
- Existed: 1933–present

Major junctions
- South end: US 1 in Huntington
- I-95 / I-495 near Huntington
- North end: SR 236 in Alexandria

Location
- Country: United States
- State: Virginia
- Counties: Fairfax, City of Alexandria

Highway system
- Virginia Routes; Interstate; US; Primary; Secondary; Byways; History; HOT lanes
← SR 240	→ SR 242

State Route 241 (SR 241) is a primary state highway in the U.S. state of Virginia. The state highway runs 1.88 miles (3.03 km) from U.S. Route 1 (US 1) in Huntington north to SR 236 in Alexandria. SR 241 connects US 1 and SR 236, bypass Old Town Alexandria to the southwest. The state highway connects those highways with Interstate 95 and I-495, Huntington Avenue, and Eisenhower Avenue in a series of interchanges along the boundary of Fairfax County and the independent city of Alexandria. SR 241 also connects the above highways to the Huntington station of the Washington Metro, for which the portion of the highway from US 1 to the station is part of the National Highway System.

== Route description ==
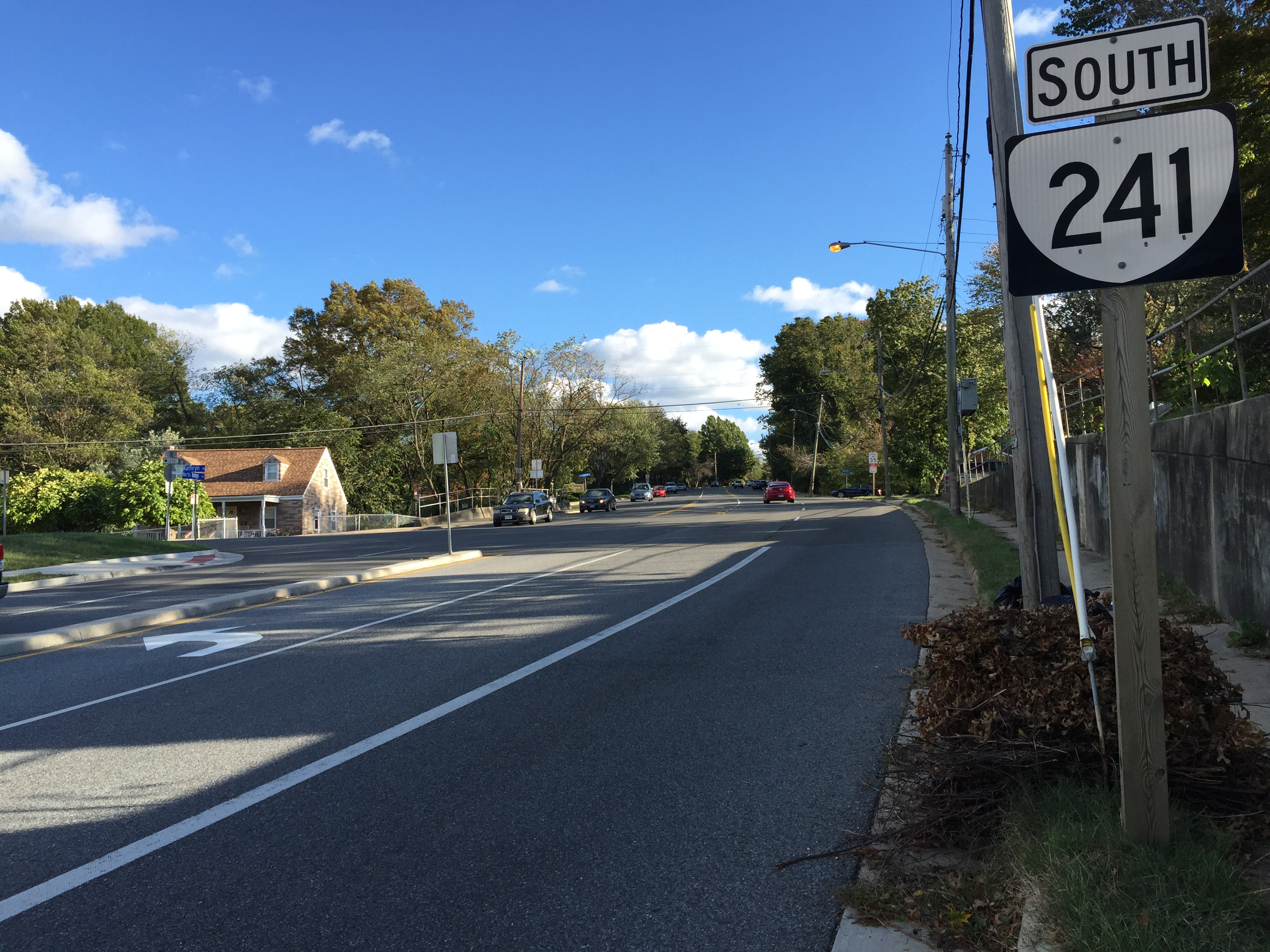
View south along SR 241 in Huntington

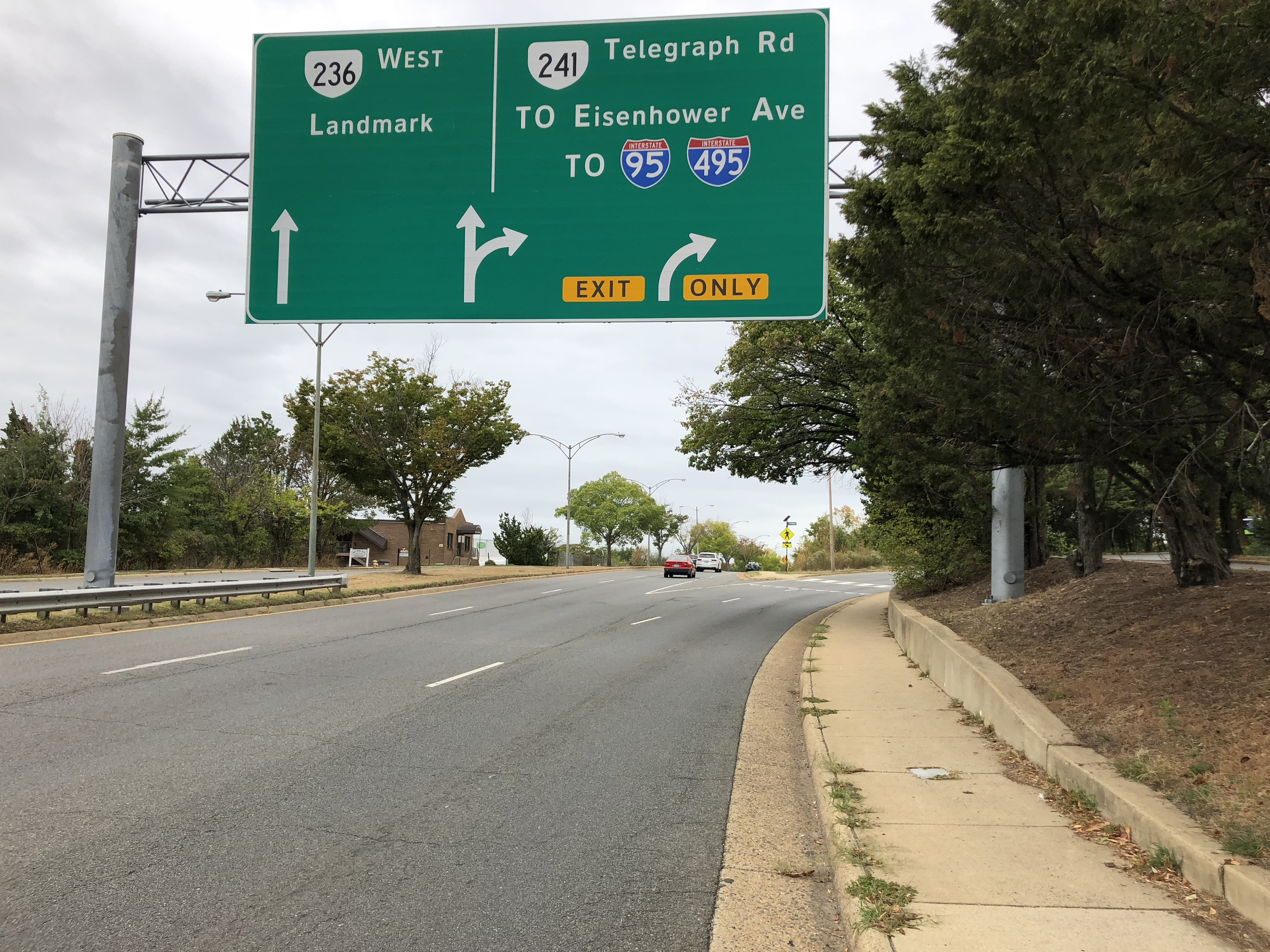
The north end of SR 241 at SR 236 in Alexandria

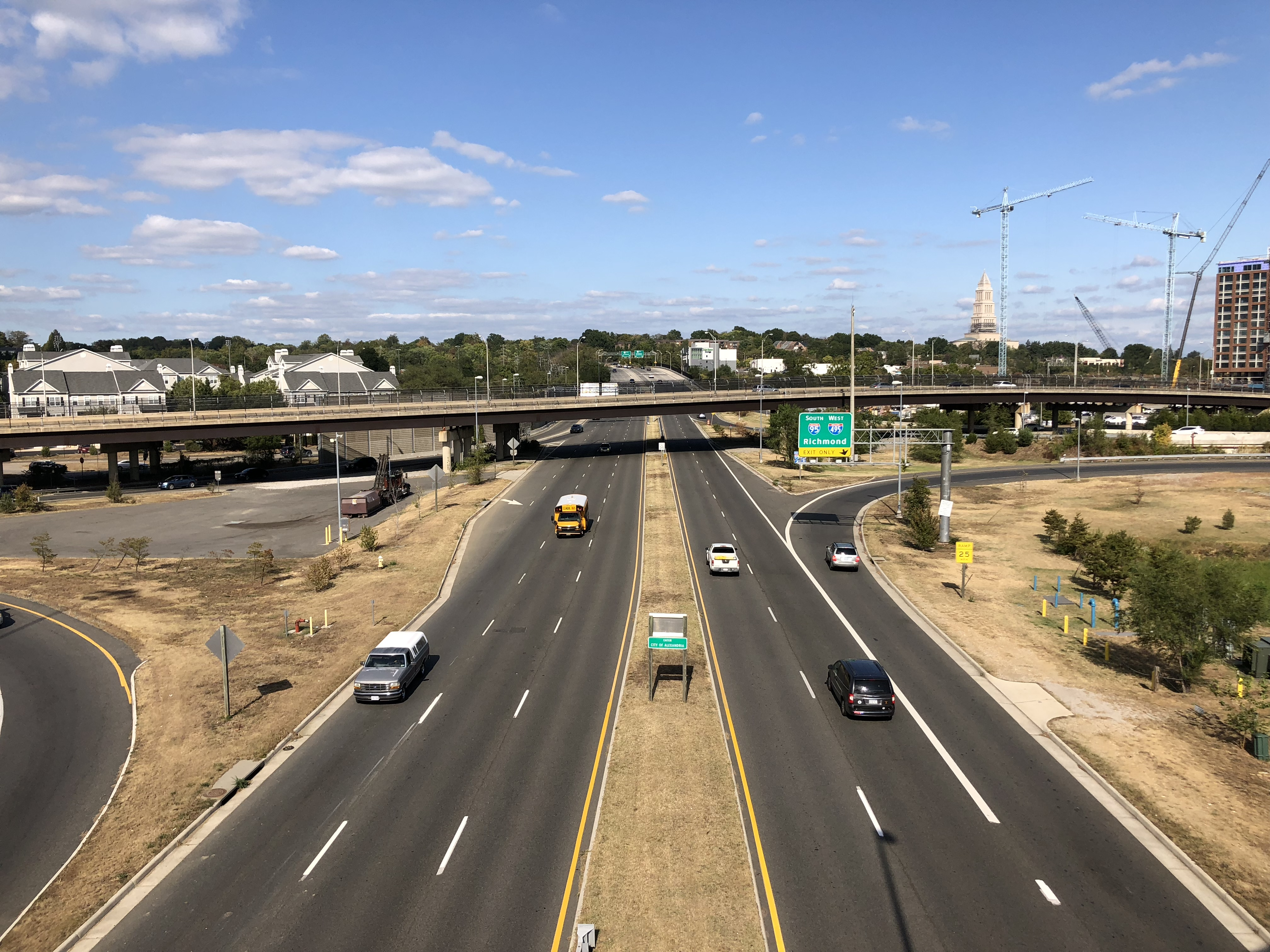
View north along SR 241 from I-95/I-495 in Alexandria

SR 241 begins at an intersection with US 1 (Richmond Highway) on the southern edge of Huntington. Immediately to the west of the intersection, the state highway has an intersection with SR 633, which heads south as Kings Highway and has a tangent intersection with US 1 before veering southwest toward Groveton. SR 241 heads northwest as Kings Highway, a five-lane road with a center left-turn lane that passes through a residential area. Within Huntington, the state highway passes the Huntington station, which is the southern terminus of the Washington Metro's Yellow Line. At the northern end of Kings Highway, SR 241 turns north onto six-lane divided Telegraph Road, which continues south as SR 611. Passing above Telegraph Road immediately to the south and north of the intersection are direct ramps from northbound I-95 and I-495 (Capital Beltway) to Kings Highway and Huntington Avenue, respectively. Southbound SR 611 also receives a direct ramp from the Beltway. Opposite Kings Highway is a loop ramp from southbound SR 241 that joins the Beltway's ramp to Huntington Avenue. The west leg of SR 241's intersection with Huntington Avenue includes a third direct ramp from the Beltway.

North of the Telegraph Road – Kings Highway – Huntington Avenue intersection-interchange complex, SR 241 crosses Cameron Run and has its partial cloverleaf interchange with the Beltway. This interchange includes a flyover ramp from northbound I-95 and I-495 that splits into ramps to northbound SR 241 and Eisenhower Avenue. Immediately north of Cameron Run, northbound SR 241 has an exit ramp to join the ramp to Eisenhower Avenue, which meets the east–west boulevard just west of the Eisenhower Avenue station of the Washington Metro. Within the interchange, the state highway enters the city of Alexandria and passes under Eisenhower Avenue. Northbound SR 241 receives a ramp from Eisenhower Avenue via Pershing Avenue. Southbound SR 241 has a right-in/right-out interchange with Mill Road, which provides access to Eisenhower Avenue to the west. SR 241 crosses over Mill Road, CSX's RF&P Subdivision, and Washington Metro's Blue Line and reaches its northern terminus at a trumpet interchange with SR 236 (Duke Street) a short distance west of Old Town Alexandria.

== History ==

SR 241 appeared on its present route in the 1933 renumbering, following the former route of State Route 717, which itself appeared in 1930.

From 2008 to 2013, the Telegraph Road interchange with I-495 underwent major reconstruction and realignment by VDOT as part of the larger Woodrow Wilson Bridge project. The new interchange alleviates past congestion by separating the I-495 traffic bound for Huntington Avenue, Telegraph Road and North Kings Highway at exit 176A.

== Major intersections ==
County	Location	mi	km	Destinations	Notes
Fairfax	Huntington	0.00	0.00	US 1 (Richmond Highway)	Southern terminus
Fairfax	Huntington	0.08	0.13		
Fairfax	Huntington	0.59	0.95		
Fairfax	Huntington	1.14	1.83	SR 611 south (Telegraph Road)	Northern terminus of SR 611; southbound exit; northbound access via traffic signal
Fairfax	Huntington	1.21	1.95	Huntington Avenue (SR 1332)	Southbound exit; northbound access via traffic signal
Fairfax	Huntington	1.39	2.24	I-95 / I-495 – Richmond, Baltimore	Interchange; exit 176 (I-95)
City of Alexandria		1.27– 1.67	2.04– 2.69	Eisenhower Avenue / Mill Road	Interchange; signage for Eisenhower Avenue northbound and Mill Road southbound
City of Alexandria		1.88	3.03	SR 236 – Landmark, Downtown Alexandria	Northern terminus; trumpet interchange
1.000 mi = 1.609 km; 1.000 km = 0.621 mi

< SR 716	District 7 State Routes; 1928–1933	SR 718 >
