= VA1 =

VA-1 has the following meanings:

- State Route 1 (Virginia)
- Virginia's 1st congressional district
