= Solomons Store, Virginia =

Unincorporated community in Virginia, U.S.

Coordinates: 37°38′20″N 77°27′30″W

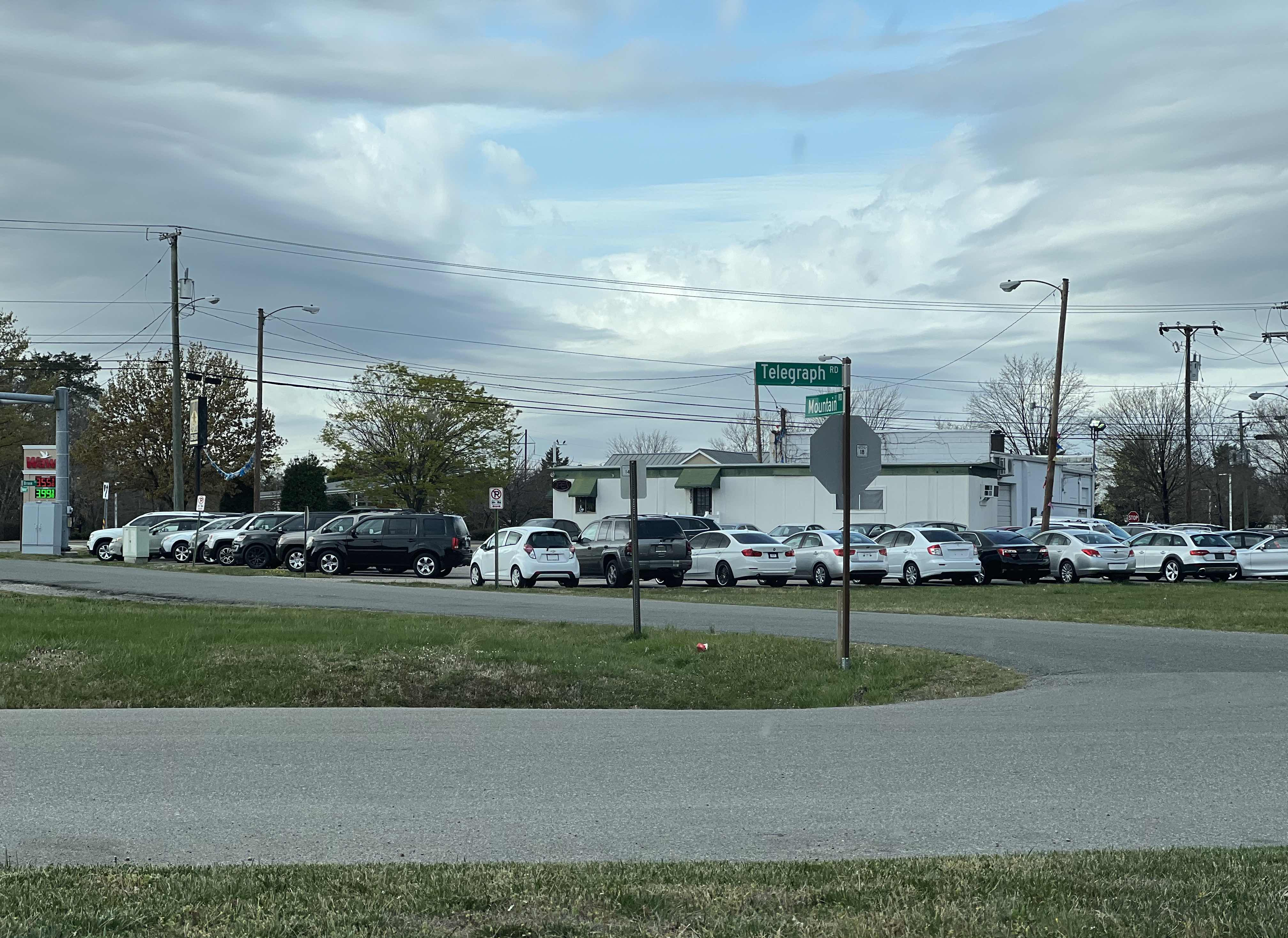
Solomons Store, Virginia

Solomons Store is a small unincorporated community in Henrico County, located where Telegraph Road and Mountain Road fork off of U.S. Route 1.
