= Four Mile Fork, Virginia =

- Unincorporated community
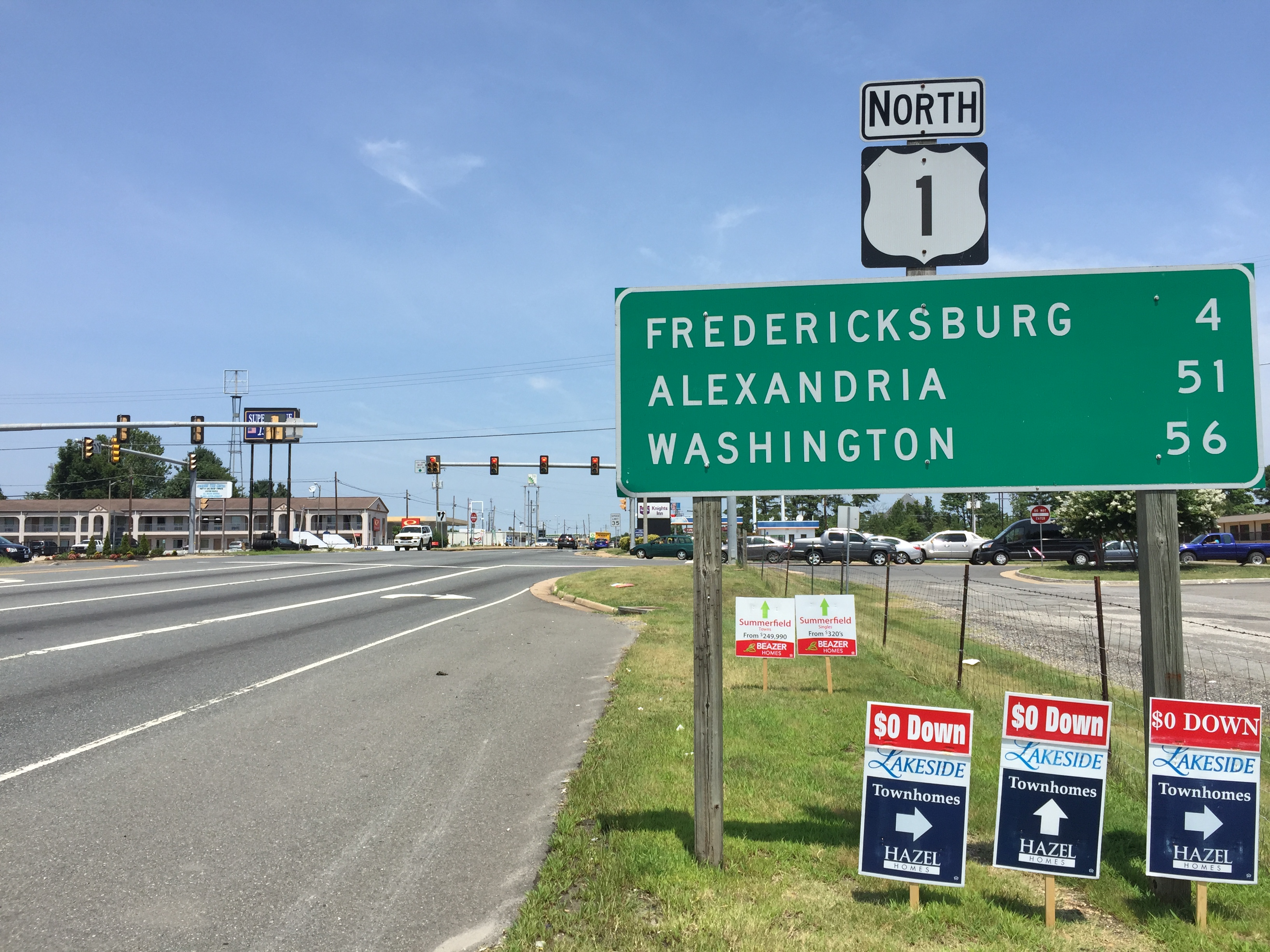

- Location within Northern Virginia Location within Virginia Location within the United States
- Coordinates: 38°15′20.1″N 77°29′51.2″W
- Country: United States
- State: Virginia
- County: Spotsylvania
- Time zone: UTC−5 (Eastern (EST))
  - Summer (DST): UTC−4 (EDT)

Four Mile Fork is an unincorporated community in Spotsylvania County, Virginia, United States, south of the city limits of Fredericksburg. Its name derives from the junction of State Route 208, U.S. Route 1, and U.S. Route 1 Business, which is located approximately four miles south of downtown Fredericksburg.

Four Mile Fork was also known as Thomas' Store.

The community began developing as a suburb of Fredericksburg in the mid-20th century, with tract housing spreading out from the city along U.S. Route 1 Business (or Lafayette Boulevard). Commercial development remained predominantly small-scale and scattered until after the completion of Interstate 95 through the area in 1964. The completion of a highway interchange with U.S. Route 1 just south of Four Mile Fork spurred new development, including lodging, restaurants, and service stations. Commercial development diversified from the late 1960s through the 1980s, with the addition of multiple automotive sales businesses, a shopping center, furniture stores, a multi-screen movie theater, and other local businesses.

The completion in 1980 of a regional shopping mall, Spotsylvania Mall (now Spotsylvania Towne Center) on Virginia Route 3 west of Fredericksburg, shifted the focus of commercial development from the Route 1 corridor to the west of the city, resulting in some decline in business activity and the closure or relocation of several prominent businesses. Since the 1990s, however, new development to the south along Routes 1 and 208 and the redevelopment of older commercial properties around Four Mile Fork has renewed business interest in the community. Although most of the subdivision development between Four Mile Fork and the city limits of Fredericksburg had been completed by the 1990s, in-fill residential development continues throughout the area.
