= Virginia State Route 235 =

State highway in Fairfax County, Virginia, US

State Route 235

Route information
- Maintained by VDOT
- Length: 5.05 mi (8.13 km)
- Existed: 1933–present

Major junctions
- South end: US 1 / SR 619 near Fort Belvoir
- George Washington Memorial Parkway in Mount Vernon
- North end: US 1 / SR 836 in Hybla Valley

Location
- Country: United States
- State: Virginia
- Counties: Fairfax

Highway system
- Virginia Routes; Interstate; US; Primary; Secondary; Byways; History; HOT lanes
← SR 234	→ SR 236

State Route 235 (SR 235) is a primary state highway in the U.S. state of Virginia. The state highway runs 5.05 miles (8.13 km) between intersections with U.S. Route 1 (US 1) in Fort Belvoir and Hybla Valley. SR 235 forms a southeast loop off of US 1 through the community of Mount Vernon in southeastern Fairfax County, connecting US 1 with Mount Vernon, the plantation home of George Washington, and the southern end of the George Washington Memorial Parkway.

== Route description ==
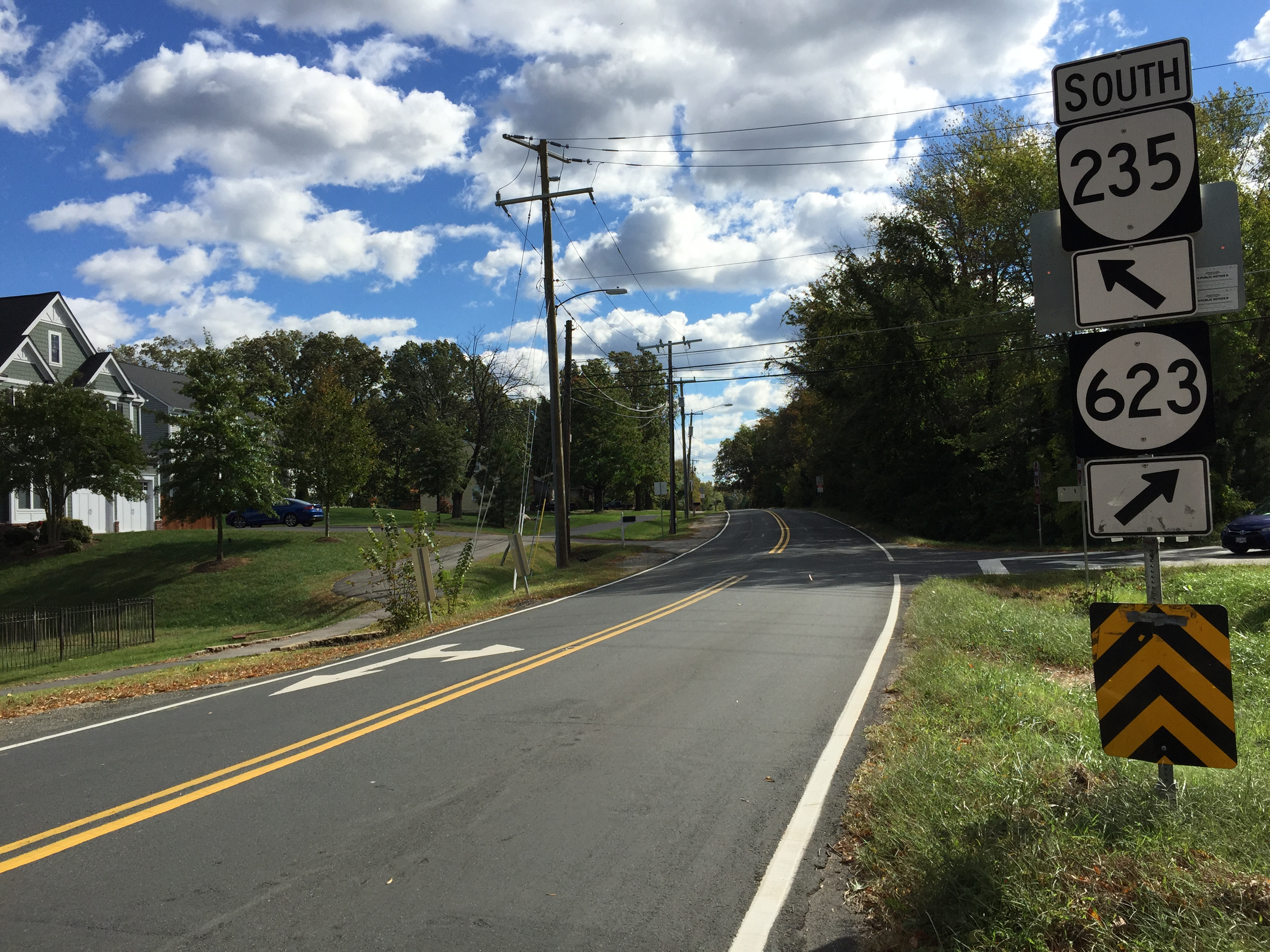
View south along SR 235 at SR 623 in Mount Vernon

SR 235 begins at an intersection with US 1 (Richmond Highway) just east of Fort Belvoir opposite the entrance to Woodlawn, a portion of George Washington's estate that also contains the 20th century Pope-Leighey House. The state highway heads southeast as Mount Vernon Memorial Highway, a two-lane undivided controlled-access highway. SR 235 passes a recreation of George Washington's Gristmill, crosses Dogue Creek, and passes an entrance to Fort Belvoir. The state highway curves to the northeast and intersects Old Mill Road and Ferry Landing Road, both part of SR 623, an oblique intersection just west of Grist Mill Park. SR 235 continues east, curving toward the south and intersects another Old Mill Road and SR 623, now named Old Mount Vernon Road, before reaching the Mount Vernon plantation, a National Historic Landmark. The roadway continues east as George Washington Memorial Parkway, which serves the estate then follows the Potomac River as a four-lane automobile parkway north to Alexandria and Washington. SR 235 turns north onto Mount Vernon Highway, a two-lane undivided highway without access controls that passes through the Mount Vernon community. The state highway passes Mount Vernon High School and meets SR 623 (Old Mount Vernon Road) on a tangent before reaching its northern terminus at US 1 (Richmond Highway) in Hybla Valley.

== Major intersections ==
The entire route is in Fairfax County.

Location	mi	km	Destinations	Notes
Woodlawn	0.00	0.00	US 1 (Richmond Highway) / SR 619 (Old Mill Road) to I-95 south – Gunston Hall	Southern terminus
Mount Vernon	3.03	4.88	George Washington Parkway north – Mount Vernon	South end of the GW Parkway
Mount Vernon	5.05	8.13	US 1 (Richmond Highway) / SR 836 (Buckman Road) to I-95 north	Northern terminus
1.000 mi = 1.609 km; 1.000 km = 0.621 mi

< SR 313	Spurs of SR 31; 1923–1928	SR 315 >
< SR 709	District 7 State Routes; 1928–1933	SR 711 >
< SR 724	District 7 State Routes; 1928–1933	SR 726 >
