= Virginia State Route 226 =

State highway in Dinwiddie County, Virginia, US

State Route 226
- Cox Road

Route information
- Maintained by VDOT
- Length: 3.38 mi (5.44 km)
- Existed: c. 1970–present

Major junctions
- West end: US 460 near Sutherland
- East end: US 1 / US 460 Bus. near Petersburg

Location
- Country: United States
- State: Virginia
- Counties: Dinwiddie

Highway system
- Virginia Routes; Interstate; US; Primary; Secondary; Byways; History; HOT lanes
← SR 225	→ SR 227

State Route 226 (SR 226) is a primary state highway in the U.S. state of Virginia. Known as Cox Road, the state highway runs 3.38 miles (5.44 km) from U.S. Route 460 (US 460) near Sutherland east to US 1 and US 460 Business near Petersburg. SR 226 is the old alignment of US 460 in northeastern Dinwiddie County.

== Route description ==
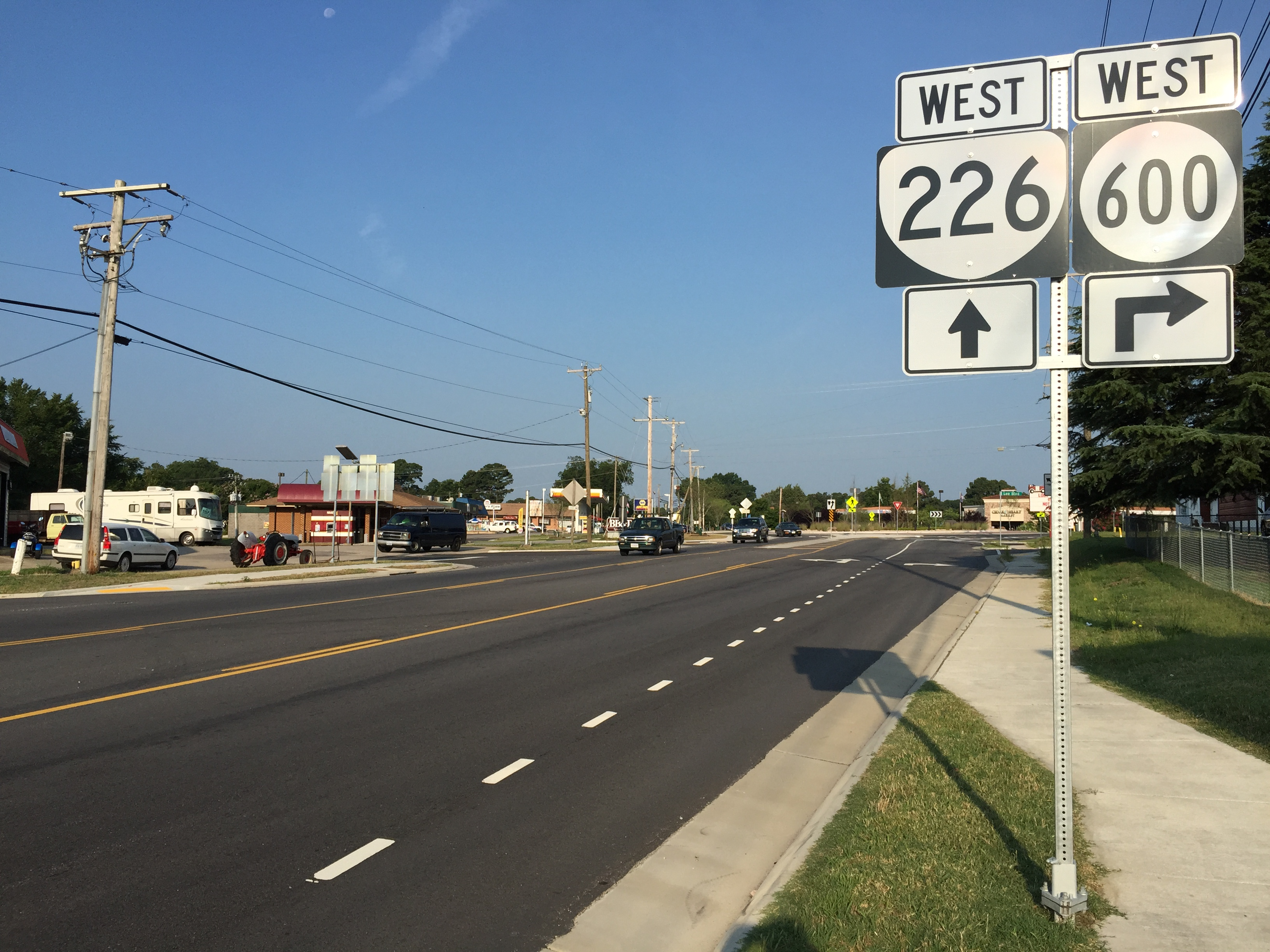
View west along SR 226 at SR 1301 just west of Petersburg

SR 226 begins at an intersection with US 460 east of Sutherland; the U.S. Highway heads west as Cox Road and southeast as Airport Street, which serves Dinwiddie County Airport on its way to junction with Interstate 85 and US 1. The state highway heads east as a two-lane undivided road that crosses over Norfolk Southern Railway's Norfolk District rail line. SR 226's surroundings gradually transition from farmland to suburban residential subdivisions and commercial strips. The state highway reaches its eastern terminus at US 1 and US 460 Business (Boydton Plank Road) a short distance west of the independent city of Petersburg.

== Major intersections ==
The entire route is in Dinwiddie County.

Location	mi	km	Destinations	Notes
Jack	0.00	0.00	US 460 (Airport Street / Cox Road) to I-85 / US 1 – Petersburg, Blackstone, Lynchburg	Western terminus
	3.38	5.44	US 1 / US 460 Bus. (Boydton Plank Road)	Eastern terminus
1.000 mi = 1.609 km; 1.000 km = 0.621 mi
