= Martin Luther King Jr. Memorial Bridge =

- Coordinates: 37°14′10.5″N 77°24′14.3″W
- Carries: US 1 / US 301 (Jefferson Davis Highway)
- Crosses: Appomattox River
- Official name: Appottamox Bridge
- Other name: Martin Luther King Jr. Memorial Bridge
- Owner: Virginia
- Preceded by: Martin Luther King Jr. Memorial Bridge

History
- Contracted lead designer: W. W. Boxley Construction Company
- Engineering design by: J. E. Greiner Company
- Constructed by: City of Petersburg, VA, Norfolk & Western Railway Company, Atlantic Coast Line Railroad Company, Virginia Railway and Power Company, and the Virginia State Highway Commission
- Construction start: 1924
- Construction end: 1925
- Rebuilt: 1990s
- Replaces: Martin Luther King Jr. Memorial Bridge

Location
- Interactive map of Martin Luther King Jr. Memorial Bridge

The Martin Luther King Jr. Memorial Bridge carries U.S. Route 1 and U.S. Route 301 (Jefferson Davis Highway) across the Appomattox River at the Atlantic Seaboard fall line. It joins Colonial Heights and Petersburg, Virginia, United States.

Originally constructed for an interurban streetcar service in the early 20th century, it was rebuilt in the 1990s and is toll-free.

== See also ==
- List of bridges documented by the Historic American Engineering Record in Virginia
- List of memorials to Martin Luther King Jr.
