= Virginia State Route 236 =

State highway in northern Virginia, US

State Route 236

Route information
- Maintained by VDOT
- Length: 15.63 mi (25.15 km)
- Existed: mid-1930s–present

Major junctions
- West end: US 29 / US 50 in Fairfax
- I-495 in Annandale; I-395 in Alexandria; US 1 in Alexandria
- East end: SR 400 in Alexandria

Location
- Country: United States
- State: Virginia
- Counties: City of Fairfax, Fairfax, City of Alexandria

Highway system
- Virginia Routes; Interstate; US; Primary; Secondary; Byways; History; HOT lanes
← SR 235	→ SR 237

State Route 236 (SR 236) is a primary state highway in the U.S. state of Virginia. The state highway runs 15.63 miles (25.15 km) from U.S. Route 29 and US 50 in Fairfax east to SR 400 in Alexandria. SR 236 is a major suburban arterial highway that connects the independent cities of Fairfax and Alexandria via Annandale in Fairfax County. The state highway is known as Main Street in City of Fairfax, Little River Turnpike in Fairfax County, where the highway meets Interstate 495 (I-495), and Duke Street in Alexandria, where the road has junctions with I-395 and US 1.

== Route description ==
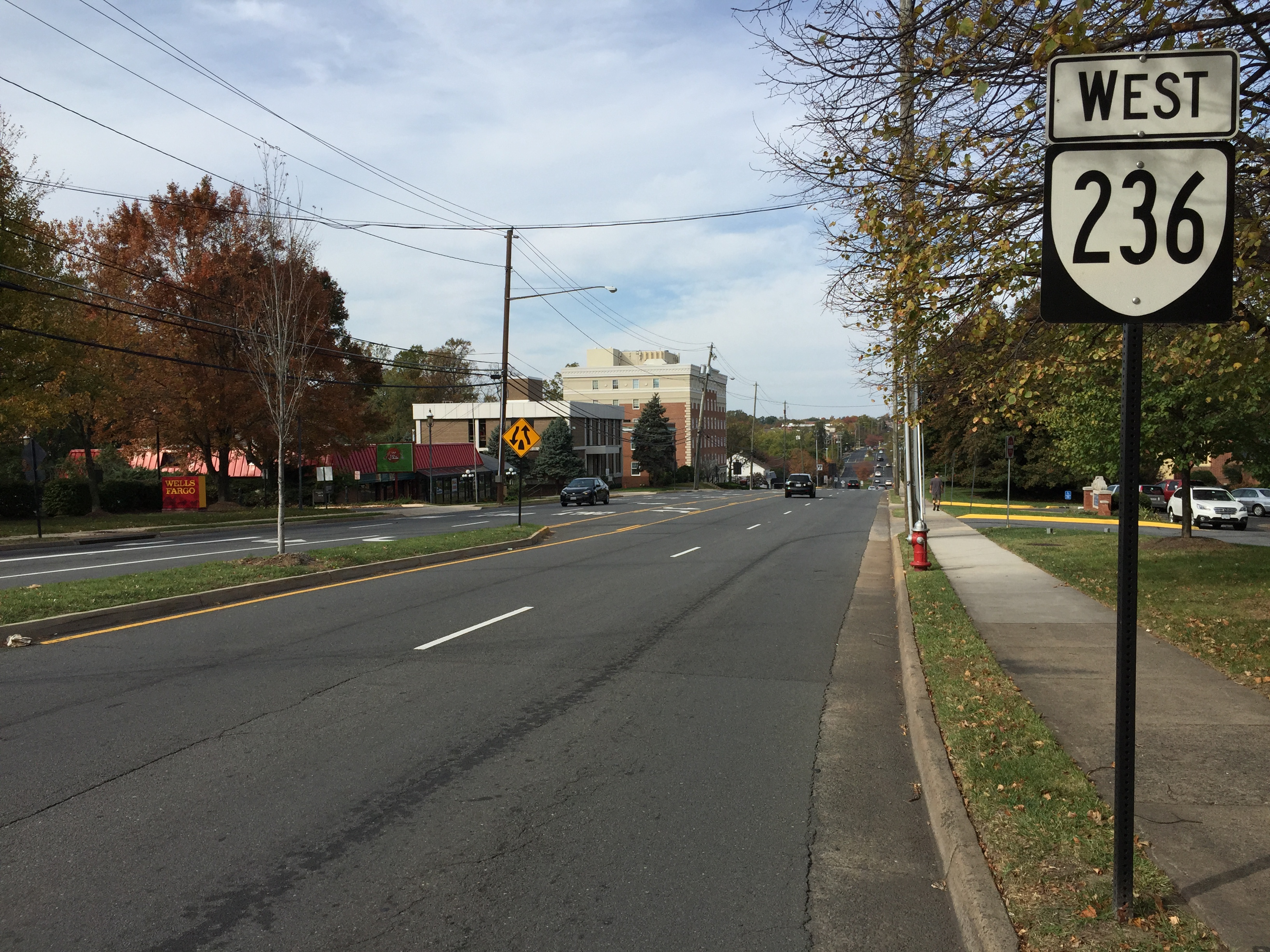
View west along SR 236 in Fairfax

SR 236 begins at an intersection with US 29 and US 50 in the western part of the city of Fairfax. US 29 heads west-southwest toward Centreville, and US 50 heads west-northwest toward Chantilly. To the east-northeast, the two U.S. Highways run concurrently as Lee Highway toward Arlington; that highway is also known as Fairfax Boulevard, which was the original bypass of Fairfax. SR 236 heads east-southeast as Main Street, a four-lane divided boulevard, through a commercial area toward downtown Fairfax.

At historic Truro Church in the City of Fairfax Historic District, SR 236 veers north onto North Street while Main Street continues straight through the downtown area. Main Street maintains one through lane in each direction and North Street maintains two through lanes per direction. Eastbound SR 236 traffic headed for northbound SR 123 (Chain Bridge Road) is recommended to use Judicial Dr and westbound SR 236 traffic aiming for southbound SR 123 must use Main Street. After three blocks, SR 236 returns to Main Street and continues east as a four-lane divided highway through the eastern part of Fairfax. SR 236 intersects Pickett Road, which heads north as SR 237 opposite Carter G. Woodson High School, before leaving the city of Fairfax and becoming Little River Turnpike.

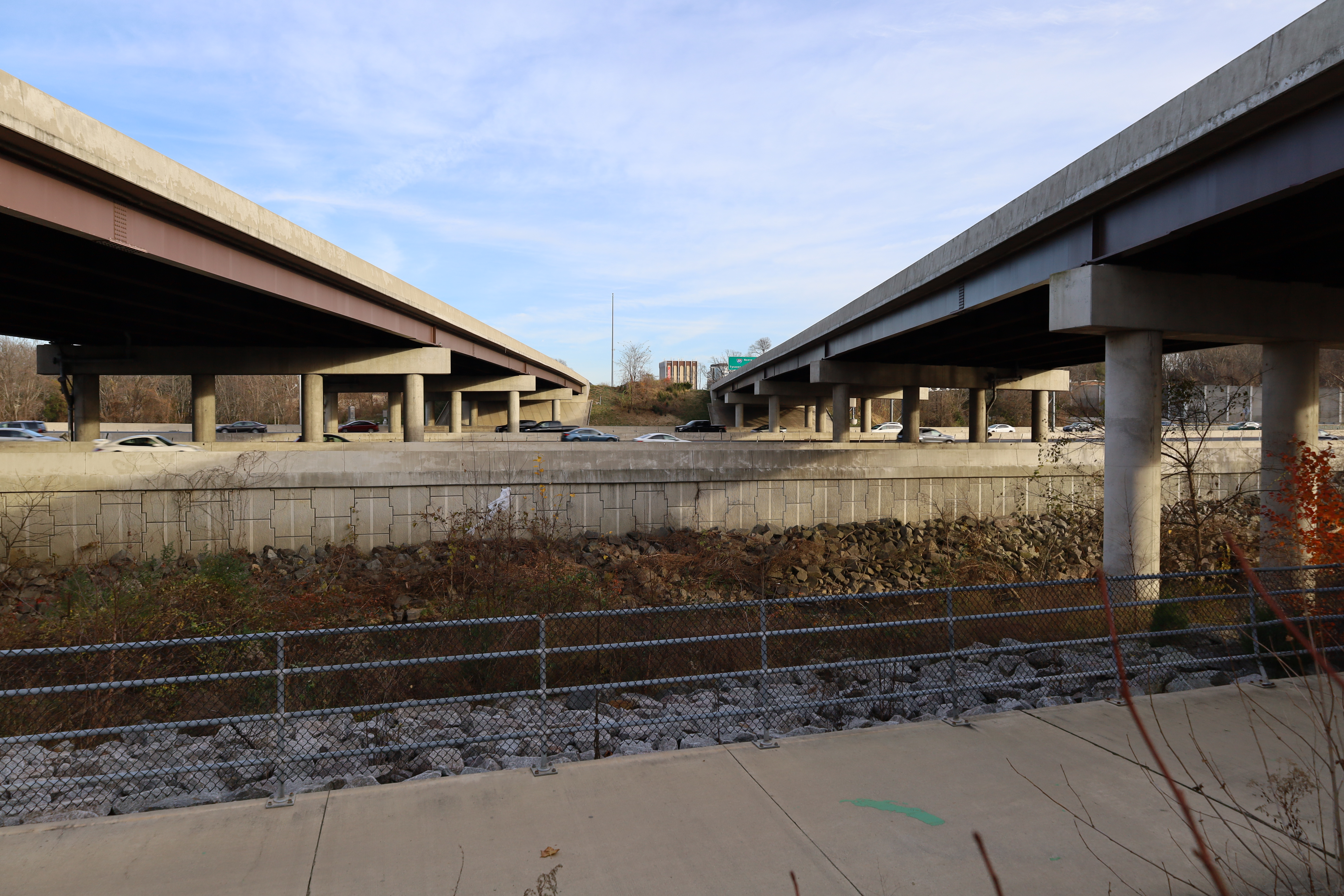
Crossing of Accotink Creek and the Capital Beltway

The state highway passes the Annandale campus of Northern Virginia Community College, whose access road is SR 376 (Lake Drive), before meeting I-495 (Capital Beltway) at a cloverleaf interchange. In the commercial center of Annandale, westbound SR 236 receives the western terminus of SR 244 (Columbia Pike), whose southernmost segment is one-way westbound. The other connections with SR 244 are provided via SR 617 (Backlick Road). The state highway passes through Lincolnia before entering the city of Alexandria just west of the highway's partial cloverleaf interchange with I-395 (Henry G. Shirley Memorial Highway). The interchange includes a flyover ramp from eastbound SR 236 to northbound I-395. SR 236 continues through Alexandria as six-lane Duke Street, which passes the Landmark Mall just west of its partial cloverleaf interchange with SR 401 (Van Dorn Street). Direct access to the mall is provided from eastbound SR 236 via a flyover ramp. The state highway has a trumpet interchange with the access road for Ben Brenman Park just west of Holmes Run, a tributary of Cameron Run, then reduces to a four-lane undivided highway at Jordan Street.

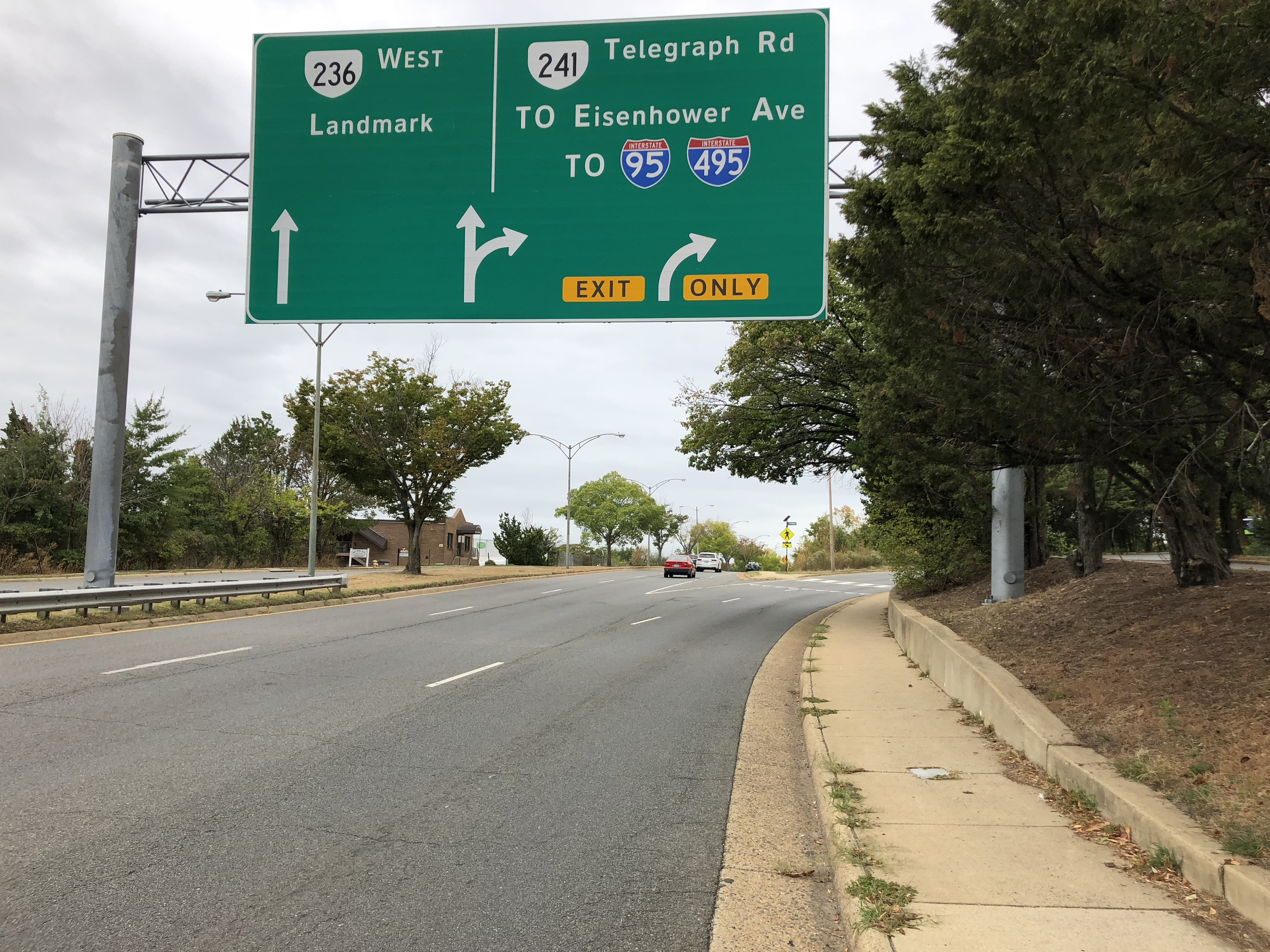
View west along SR 236 at SR 241 in Alexandria

SR 236 expands to a divided highway again at Quaker Lane and meets the northern end of Virginia State Route 241 (Telegraph Road) at a trumpet interchange; SR 241 provides access to I-95 and I-495 (Capital Beltway) and Eisenhower Avenue to the south. SR 236 passes south of the George Washington Masonic National Memorial and crosses over CSX's RF&P Subdivision, which carries Amtrak and Virginia Railway Express service as well as freight service, and the Yellow and Blue lines of the Washington Metro. Callahan Drive, which intersects the state highway just west of the railroad crossing, provides access to Alexandria Union Station. SR 236 reduces to four lanes and enters Old Town Alexandria at Diagonal Road, which provides access to Washington Metro's King Street – Old Town. The state highway reduces to two lanes at US 1, which follows Henry Street southbound and Patrick Street northbound. Three blocks to the east, SR 236 reaches its eastern terminus at SR 400 (Washington Street), which leads to the George Washington Memorial Parkway in both directions. Duke Street continues east as an unnumbered road seven blocks to the Robinson Terminal on the Potomac River.

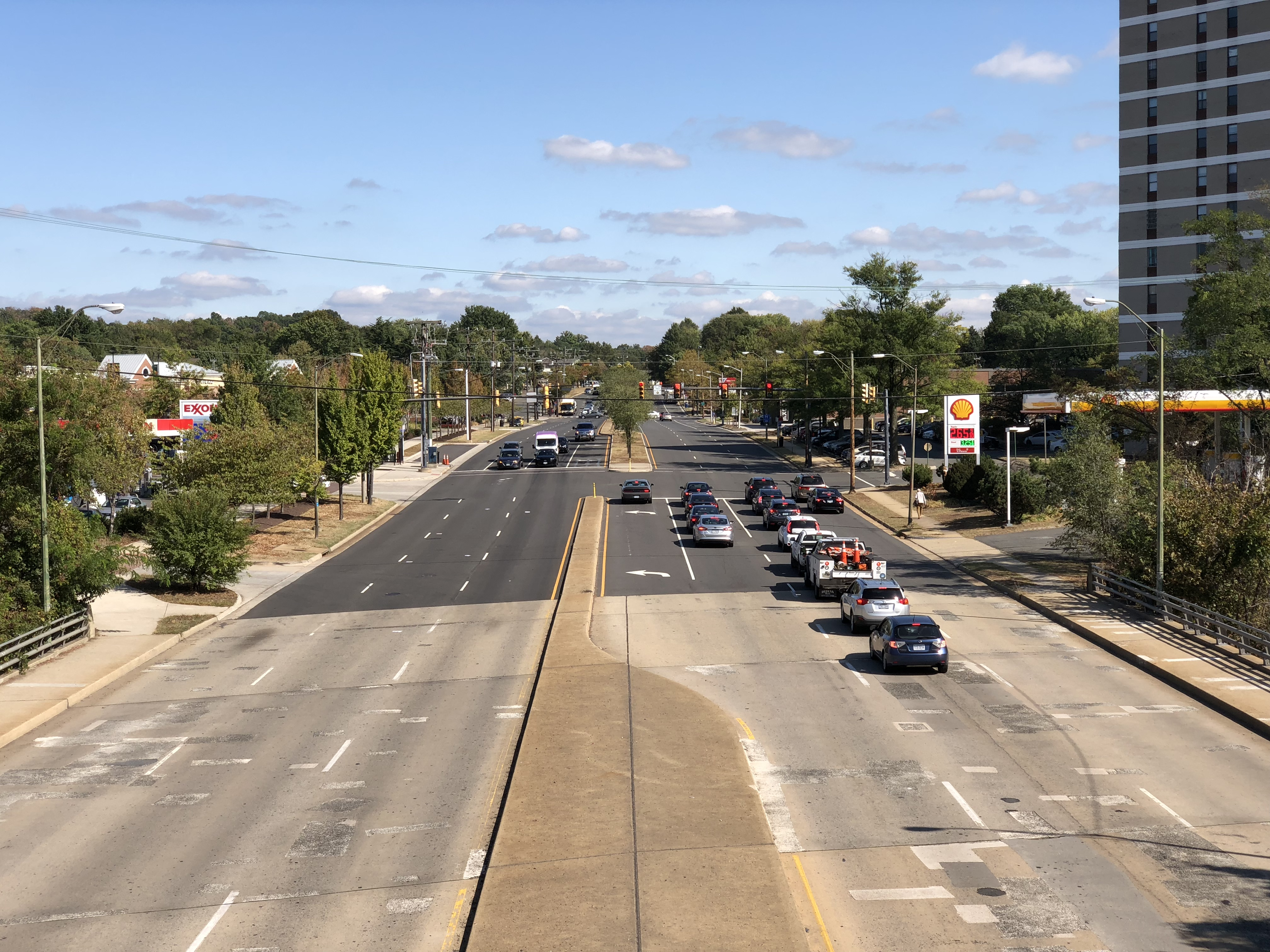
View east along SR 236 at Deer Run Court in Alexandria

== History ==
The Little River Turnpike was built between 1801 and 1806, and the road was a privately owned and operated toll road during the 19th century running from Alexandria to Aldie in Loudoun County, Virginia. Toll houses were placed at five mile intervals along the road for collection of fees. The road was a paved ("macadamized") road 20 feet wide. The road remained a private road until it became a public road in 1896.

Several sections of the road originated as Indian trails, and a majority of the road traversed rural areas. Many Civil War battles and skirmishes were fought at locations along or near the road. Currently, the portion of the historical turnpike between Aldie and Fairfax is part of US 50. Only the SR 236 section and the US 50 section in Loudoun County continue to carry the Little River Turnpike name. SR 236 appeared in its present location in July 1935 as a replacement for US 50, which for several years previously ran the entire length of the historic Little River Turnpike to Alexandria before turning northward toward Washington concurrent with US 1. Prior to that, State Route 236 ran along present US 50 east of Fairfax; the two routes were swapped at that time.

== Major intersections ==
County	Location	mi	km	Destinations	Notes
City of Fairfax		0.00	0.00	US 29 / US 50 (Main Street / Lee Highway / Fairfax Boulevard) to I-66	Western terminus
City of Fairfax		1.06	1.71	SR 123 (Chain Bridge Road)	left turns from SR 236 westbound (to VA 123 southbound) are made via Main Street access to VA 123 southbound from VA 236 eastbound are made using Judicial Dr
City of Fairfax		1.2	1.9	Blenheim Boulevard (Formerly Old Lee Highway)	
City of Fairfax		3.12	5.02	SR 237 east (Pickett Road)	
Fairfax		5.06	8.14	SR 376 (Lake Drive) – Northern Virginia Community College	
Fairfax		5.95	9.58	I-495 – Tysons Corner, Richmond, Alexandria	Exit 52 (I-495)
Fairfax	Annandale	7	11	Annandale Road (SR 650 north) / Ravensworth Road (SR 2864 south)	
Fairfax	Annandale	7.1	11.4	SR 617 (Backlick Road) – Falls Church, Springfield	
Fairfax	Annandale	7.2	11.6	To SR 244 east (Columbia Pike) / SR 617 south / John Marr Drive (SR 2948) – Baileys Cross Road, Springfield	
Fairfax	Pinecrest	8.9	14.3	SR 620 (Braddock Road)	
Fairfax	Lincolnia	10	16	SR 713 (Beauregard Street)	to SR 613
City of Alexandria		10.79	17.36	I-395 to I-95 – Richmond, Washington	Exit 3 (I-395)
City of Alexandria		11.11	17.88	Van Dorn Street (SR 401) - Mall, Shopping Plaza	Partial cloverleaf interchange
City of Alexandria		14.13	22.74	SR 241 south (Telegraph Road) to I-95 / I-495 / to Eisenhower Avenue – Cameron Run Regional Park	Trumpet interchange
City of Alexandria		15.39	24.77	US 1 south (South Henry Street) to I-95	
City of Alexandria		15.45	24.86	US 1 north (South Patrick Street)	no left turn eastbound
City of Alexandria		15.63	25.15	SR 400 (South Washington Street) / George Washington Parkway	Eastern terminus
1.000 mi = 1.609 km; 1.000 km = 0.621 mi
