= Virginia State Route 242 =

State highway in Fairfax County, Virginia, US

State Route 242
- Gunston Road

Route information
- Maintained by VDOT
- Length: 3.58 mi (5.76 km)
- Existed: 1950–present

Major junctions
- West end: US 1 / SR 600 near Lorton
- East end: SR 600 on Mason Neck

Location
- Country: United States
- State: Virginia
- Counties: Fairfax

Highway system
- Virginia Routes; Interstate; US; Primary; Secondary; Byways; History; HOT lanes
← SR 241	→ SR 243

State Route 242 (SR 242) is a primary state highway in the U.S. state of Virginia. Known as Gunston Road, the state highway runs 3.58 miles (5.76 km) from U.S. Route 1 (US 1) near Lorton east to SR 600 at the entrance to Gunston Hall, the plantation of George Mason, on Mason Neck in southeastern Fairfax County.

== Route description ==
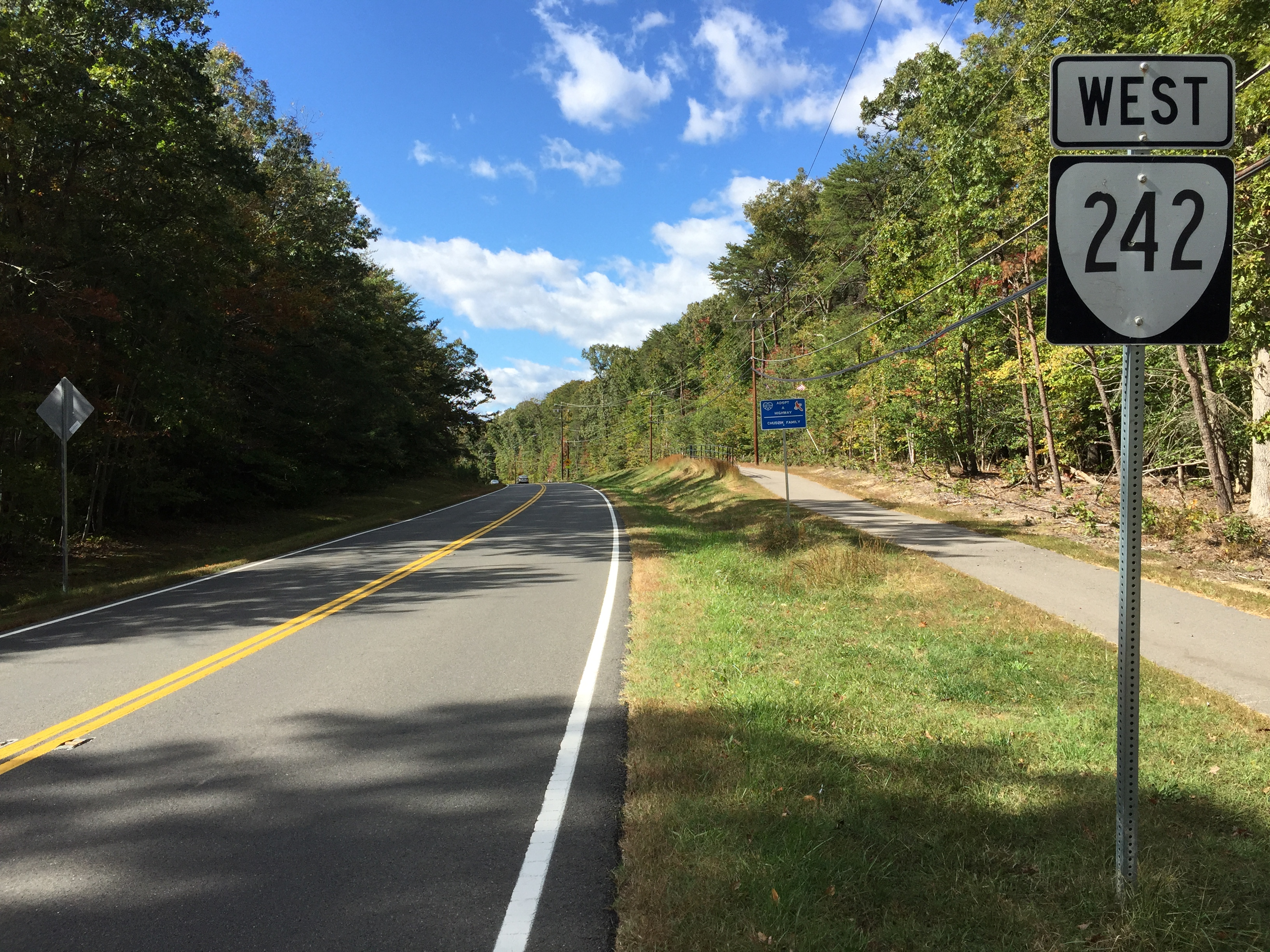
View west along SR 242 in Mason Neck

SR 242 begins at an intersection with US 1 (Richmond Highway) near Lorton. The west leg of the intersection is SR 600 (Gunston Cove Road), which heads north through a suburban area of Lorton near Interstate 95. SR 242 heads southeast as a two-lane undivided road through a forested area with scattered residences on Mason Neck, a peninsula that fronts the Potomac River between Belmont Bay and the mouth of the Occoquan River to the west and Gunston Cove, a bay formed by the confluence of Pohick Creek and Accotink Creek, to the east. SR 242 passes Pohick Bay Golf Course and the access roads for Mason Neck State Park and Pohick Bay Regional Park. The state highway reaches its eastern terminus at the entrance to Gunston Hall. Gunston Road continues southeast as Gunston Road toward Elizabeth Hartwell Mason Neck National Wildlife Refuge and a residential community at the southeastern tip of Mason Neck, Hallowing Point.

== Major intersections ==
The entire route is in Fairfax County.

Location	mi	km	Destinations	Notes
Lorton	0.00	0.00	US 1 (Richmond Highway) / SR 600 west (Gunston Cove Road)	Western terminus
Mason Neck	3.58	5.76	SR 600 east (Gunston Road) – Gunston Hall	Eastern terminus
1.000 mi = 1.609 km; 1.000 km = 0.621 mi
