= Huntington, Virginia =

- Census-designated place
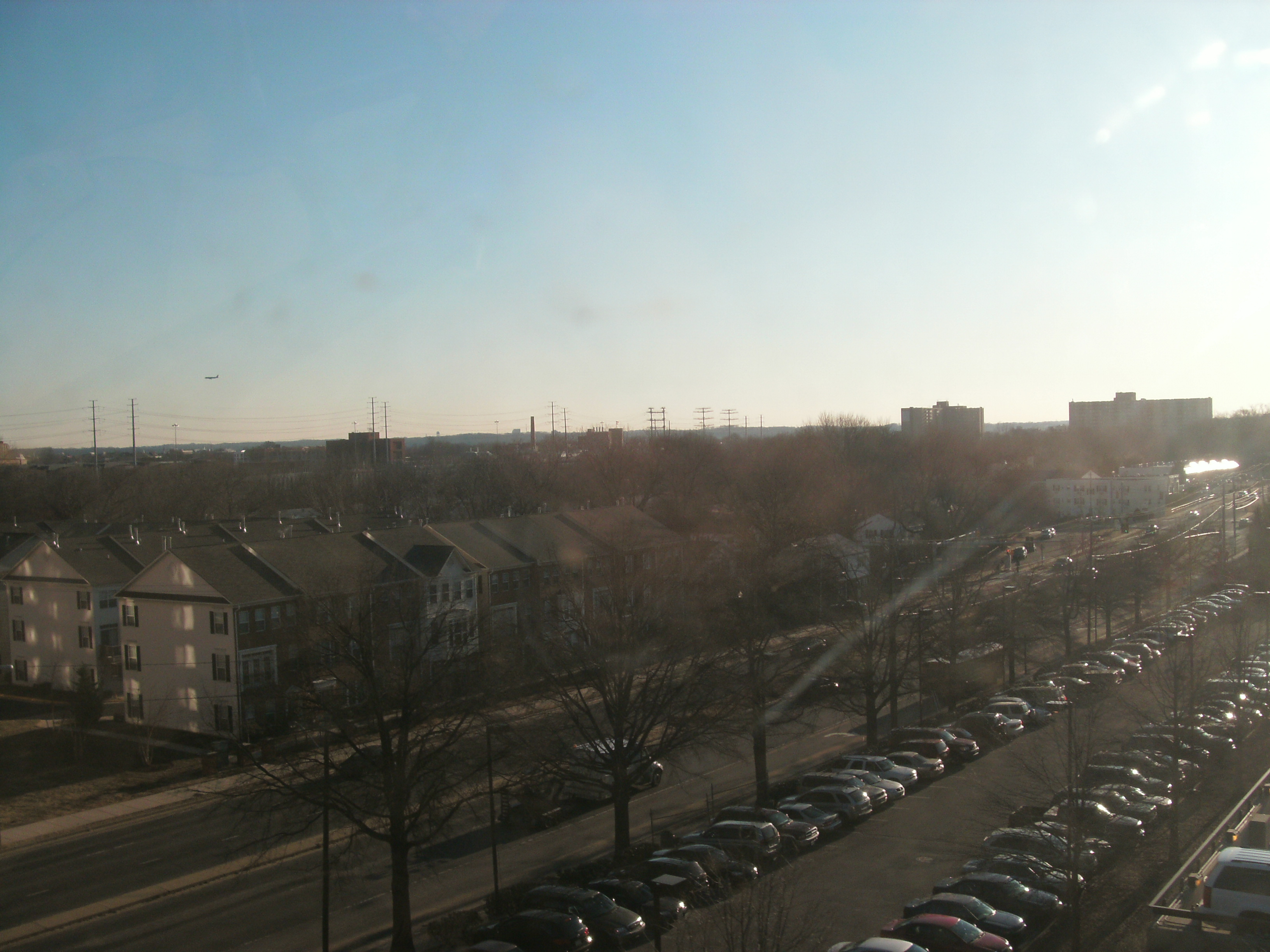
- Huntington as seen from the Washington Metro; the lower parking deck of Huntington Station may be seen in the foreground.

- Location of Huntington in Fairfax County, Virginia

- Location within Northern Virginia Location within Virginia Location within the United States
- Coordinates: 38°47′33″N 77°4′20″W
- Country: United States
- State: Virginia
- County: Fairfax

Area
  - Total: 1.1 sq mi (2.9 km^{2})
  - Land: 1.1 sq mi (2.8 km^{2})
  - Water: 0.039 sq mi (0.1 km^{2})
- Elevation: 66 ft (20 m)

Population (2020)
  - Total: 13,749
  - Density: 10,368/sq mi (4,003.3/km^{2})
- Time zone: UTC−5 (Eastern (EST))
  - Summer (DST): UTC−4 (EDT)
- FIPS code: 51-39064
- GNIS feature ID: 1493118

Huntington is a census-designated place (CDP) in Fairfax County, Virginia, United States. As of the 2020 census, Huntington had a population of 13,749. It is located adjacent to the southern border of the city of Alexandria and is part of the Washington metropolitan area. Its main component is the namesake Huntington subdivision, a late-1940s neighborhood of mainly duplex homes.

In June 2006, the lower-lying northern section was ravaged by floods due to a torrential rainstorm that sent adjoining Cameron Run over its banks. The Washington Metro's Yellow Line terminates at the Huntington Metro station. There are also several high-rise apartment and condominium complexes on and near U.S. Route 1 where much of the CDP's population resides. The area is included in ZIP code 22303 and has an Alexandria mailing address, although it is outside the city limits.

== Geography ==
Huntington is located in southeastern Fairfax County at 38°47′33″N 77°4′20″W (38.792563, −77.072120). It is bordered to the north by the city of Alexandria, to the southeast by Belle Haven, and to the west by Rose Hill. U.S. Route 1 forms the border between Huntington and Belle Haven, and the boundary with Rose Hill is drawn to follow Poag Street, Shaffer Drive, Florence Lane, and Telegraph Road. Downtown Alexandria (Old Town) is 2 miles (3 km) to the northeast, and downtown Washington, D.C. is 10 miles (16 km) to the north.

According to the United States Census Bureau, the Huntington CDP has a total area of 1.1 square miles (2.9 km^{2}), of which 1.1 square miles (2.8 km^{2}) is land and 0.04 square miles (0.1 km^{2}), or 3.47%, is water.

== Demographics ==
=== Racial and ethnic composition ===
Huntington CDP, Virginia – Racial and ethnic composition Note: the US Census treats Hispanic/Latino as an ethnic category. This table excludes Latinos from the racial categories and assigns them to a separate category. Hispanics/Latinos may be of any race.
Race / Ethnicity (NH = Non-Hispanic)	Pop 2000	Pop 2010	Pop 2020	% 2000	% 2010	% 2020
White alone (NH)	4,944	5,896	6,439	59.39%	52.33%	46.83%
Black or African American alone (NH)	1,356	1,485	2,094	16.29%	13.18%	15.23%
Native American or Alaska Native alone (NH)	23	30	19	0.28%	0.27%	0.14%
Asian alone (NH)	580	1,064	1,435	6.97%	9.44%	10.44%
Native Hawaiian or Pacific Islander alone (NH)	12	7	12	0.14%	0.06%	0.09%
Other race alone (NH)	10	25	96	0.12%	0.22%	0.70%
Mixed race or Multiracial (NH)	234	315	694	2.81%	2.80%	5.05%
Hispanic or Latino (any race)	1,166	2,445	2,960	14.01%	21.70%	21.53%
Total	8,325	11,267	13,749	100.00%	100.00%	100.00%

=== 2020 census ===
As of the 2020 census, Huntington had a population of 13,749. The median age was 35.4 years. 15.2% of residents were under the age of 18 and 12.2% of residents were 65 years of age or older. For every 100 females, there were 99.6 males, and for every 100 females age 18 and over, there were 100.1 males age 18 and over.

100.0% of residents lived in urban areas, while 0.0% lived in rural areas.

There were 7,113 households in Huntington, of which 18.1% had children under the age of 18 living in them. Of all households, 30.5% were married-couple households, 29.5% were households with a male householder and no spouse or partner present, and 31.7% were households with a female householder and no spouse or partner present. About 45.9% of all households were made up of individuals and 9.5% had someone living alone who was 65 years of age or older.

There were 7,523 housing units, of which 5.4% were vacant. The homeowner vacancy rate was 1.1% and the rental vacancy rate was 4.7%.

=== 2000 census ===
As of the census of 2000, there were 8,325 people, 4,615 households, and 1,675 families residing in the CDP. The population density was 10,665.6 inhabitants per square mile (4,118.0/km^{2}). There were 4,860 housing units at an average density of 6,226.4 per square mile (2,404.0/km^{2}). The racial makeup of the CDP was 64.95% White, 16.74% African American, 0.40% Native American, 7.02% Asian, 0.16% Pacific Islander, 6.91% from other races, and 3.83% from two or more races. Hispanic or Latino of any race were 14.01% of the population.

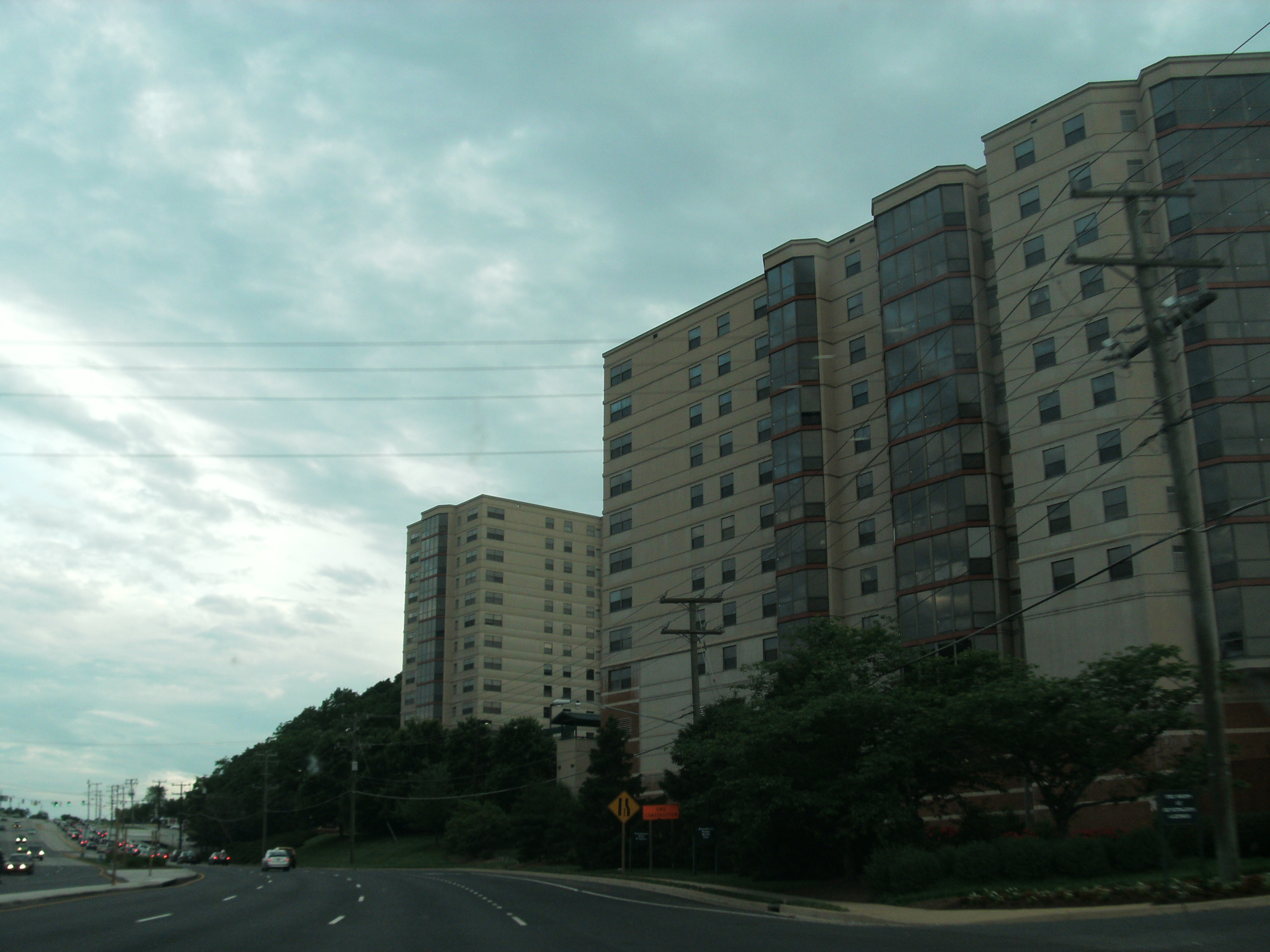
Apartment complex along US Rte. 1 in Huntington

There were 4,615 households, out of which 11.9% had children under the age of 18 living with them, 26.8% were married couples living together, 6.7% had a female householder with no husband present, and 63.7% were non-families. 52.6% of all households were made up of individuals, and 7.6% had someone living alone who was 65 years of age or older. The average household size was 1.80 and the average family size was 2.75.

In the CDP, the population was spread out, with 13.0% under the age of 18, 10.0% from 18 to 24, 43.2% from 25 to 44, 23.4% from 45 to 64, and 10.4% who were 65 years of age or older. The median age was 36 years. For every 100 females, there were 101.9 males. For every 100 females age 18 and over, there were 100.9 males.

The median income for a household in the CDP was $52,364, and the median income for a family was $62,228. Males had a median income of $43,429 versus $36,563 for females. The per capita income for the CDP was $36,945. About 6.8% of families and 7.7% of the population were below the poverty line, including 19.0% of those under age 18 and 0.6% of those age 65 or over.
