= U.S. Route 1 in Virginia =

Section of United States Numbered Highway in Virginia

U.S. Route 1
- US 1 highlighted in red

Route information
- Maintained by VDOT
- Length: 196.55 mi (316.32 km)
- Existed: 1926–present

Major junctions
- South end: US 1 at the North Carolina state line near Palmer Springs
- US 58 in South Hill; I-85 / US 460 near Petersburg; US 301 in Petersburg; US 60 in Richmond; US 360 in Richmond; US 250 in Richmond; I-64 / I-95 in Richmond; I-295 in Glen Allen; US 17 in Fredericksburg; I-95 / I-495 in Alexandria
- North end: I-395 / US 1 at the District of Columbia boundary in Arlington

Location
- Country: United States
- State: Virginia
- Counties: Mecklenburg, Brunswick, Dinwiddie, City of Petersburg, City of Colonial Heights, Chesterfield, City of Richmond, Henrico, Hanover, Caroline, Spotsylvania, City of Fredericksburg, Stafford, Prince William, Fairfax, City of Alexandria, Arlington

Highway system
- United States Numbered Highway System; List; Special; Divided; Virginia Routes; Interstate; US; Primary; Secondary; Byways; History; HOT lanes
← SR 895	→ SR 2

U.S. Route 1 (US 1) is a major north–south U.S. Route that serves the East Coast of the United States. In the U.S. state of Virginia, US 1 runs north–south through South Hill, Petersburg, Richmond, Fredericksburg, and Alexandria on its way from North Carolina to the 14th Street bridges into the District of Columbia. It is completely paralleled by Interstate Highways in Virginia—Interstate 85 (I-85) south of Petersburg, I-95 north to Alexandria, and I-395 into the District of Columbia—and now serves mainly local traffic. At its north end, on the approach to the 14th Street bridges, US 1 is concurrent with I-395; the rest of US 1 is on surface roads.

What became US 1 was part of prior Virginia state routes, primarily State Route 31 (SR 31). Even earlier than that, it was part of an auto trail known as the Jefferson Davis Highway; no portions of the route still bear that name. While minor adjustments have been made, it still largely follows the same route it has since first being designated in 1926.

== Route description ==
=== Palmer Springs to Petersburg ===
US 1 enters southeastern Mecklenburg County from Warren County, North Carolina, east of Palmer Springs, north of Wise, North Carolina, and north of an interchange between I-85 and US 1 between Wise and the state line. The U.S. Route heads north as a two-lane road, passes to the east of Palmer Springs, and crosses Lake Gaston, an impoundment of the Roanoke River. North of the lake, the highway gains an intermittent second lane northbound to its junction with US 58 at Big Fork. The U.S. Routes run concurrently northeast along a four-lane road with center turn lane to the southwestern edge of South Hill, where the highway expands to a four-lane divided highway shortly before US 1 and US 58 Business (US 58 Bus.) split northeast from US 58. The mainline highway and business route enter the town of South Hill along Danville Street, a two-lane road with center turn lane. As the highways approach downtown South Hill, the center turn lane ends. In downtown, US 1 and US 58 Bus. turn north onto Mecklenburg Avenue next to historic Colonial Theatre, then US 58 Bus. turns east onto Atlantic Street; SR 47 heads west from the intersection on Atlantic Street. US 1 gains a center turn lane again northeast of downtown. The U.S. Route meets the southern end of SR 138 (Union Mill Road), then expands to a four-lane divided highway for its four-ramp partial cloverleaf interchange with I-85 before leaving the town of South Hill.

US 1 continues northeast as a three-lane road that alternates between two lanes northbound, two lanes southbound, and a center turn lane. The route expands to a four-lane divided highway after entering Brunswick County, where the highway's name becomes Boydton Plank Road, and before crossing the Meherrin River. US 1 reduces to a three-lane road and passes through Meredithville. At Cochran, the highway intersects SR 46 (Christanna Highway) just south of the Christanna Campus of Southside Virginia Community College. US 1 expands to a four-lane divided highway; the southbound lanes pass under a narrow former railroad bridge. The highway has a diamond interchange with I-85, then passes through the southern edge of the town of Alberta, where the U.S. Route meets the eastern end of SR 136 (Church Street). East of Alberta, US 1 becomes three lanes and passes through the adjacent communities of Warfield and Sturgeonville and to the east of Rawlings before expanding to a four-lane divided highway immediately before crossing the Nottoway River into Dinwiddie County.

US 1 reduces to three lanes a short distance north of the river and passes through the town of McKenney, where the highway intersects SR 40 (Doyle Boulevard). The highway passes through DeWitt, then expands to a four-lane divided highway and crosses a former railroad line. US 1 crosses Stony Creek and drops to three lanes as it enters the county seat of Dinwiddie and passes Dinwiddie County Court House. Northeast of Dinwiddie, US 1 passes under I-85 with no access and meets the eastern end of Airport Street, which comprises the westernmost segment of US 460 Bus. that connects US 1 with I-85 and US 460 and, to the west of the Interstate, Dinwiddie County Airport. US 1 and US 460 Bus. pass Pamplin Historical Park, which preserves the Petersburg Breakthrough Battlefield, then cross over Norfolk Southern Railway's Norfolk District rail line. The routes expand to a four-lane divided highway at its intersection with SR 142 (Simpson Road), then they meet I-85 and US 460 at a six-ramp partial cloverleaf interchange. US 1 and US 460 Bus. reduce to two lanes plus center turn lane and pass along the western and northern sides of Central State Hospital; on their curve east, the routes meet the eastern end of SR 226 (Cox Road). East of the hospital complex, the highways enter the independent city of Petersburg.

=== Petersburg to Richmond ===
US 1 and US 460 Bus. enter Petersburg along Washington Street, a four-lane road with center turn lane. After passing under CSX Transportation's North End Subdivision rail line, the highways split into a one-way pair, with northbound US 1 and eastbound US 460 Bus. using Wythe Street and southbound US 1 and westbound US 460 Bus. using Washington Street. US 1 and US 460 Bus. pass through residential Folly Castle Historic District, which includes Second Presbyterian Church on Washington Street, and Atlantic Coast Line Railroad Commercial and Industrial Historic District. Eastbound SR 36 joins the eastbound concurrency at Market Street within smaller South Market Street Historic District. US 301 Alternate (US 301 Alt.) joins both directions at Sycamore Street; one block to the east—a block that contains Washington Street Methodist Church—US 1 and US 301 Alt. turn north onto four-lane Adams Street. The two U.S. Routes pass between commercial Petersburg Courthouse Historic District, which contains the namesake judicial building, and residential Centre Hill Historic District, which contains the eponymous mansion and museum. US 1 continues into Petersburg Old Town Historic District, where the highway intersects Bank and Bolingbrook streets, which is the northern terminus of US 301 Alt. Southbound US 301 leaves US 1 at Bank Street, northbound US 301 joins US 1 at Bolingbrook Street, and Bolingbrook Street also carries westbound SR 36. North of Bolingbrook Street, US 1 and US 301 cross the Appomattox River on the Martin Luther King Jr. Memorial Bridge. On the bridge, the U.S. Routes have an intersection with Bridge Street, which leads to Pocahontas Island and its namesake historic district.

US 1 and US 301 enter the independent city of Colonial Heights along Boulevard, a four-lane street with center turn lane. Shortly after this point, US 1 reaches the halfway point between Key West and Fort Kent. The highways pass along the western edge of residential Chesterfield Highlands Historic District before intersecting SR 144 (Temple Avenue), which joins the U.S. Routes. The three highways pass under CSX Transportation's North End Subdivision, then cross Swift Creek into Chesterfield County, where SR 144 splits northwest onto Harrowgate Road at Pickadat Corner. US 1 and US 301 continue along four-lane Jefferson Davis Highway, which passes under the CSX Transportation rail line and intersects SR 10 (West Hundred Road) on the eastern edge of Chester. The U.S. Routes briefly expand to a divided highway at the SR 10 intersection and within the highway's cloverleaf interchange with SR 288 (World War II Veterans Memorial Highway), which ends at I-95 (Richmond–Petersburg Turnpike) a short distance to the east. US 1 and US 301 expand to a divided highway at their junction with SR 145 (Chester Road), cross over CSX Transportation's Bellwood Subdivision, and pass to the east of Defense Supply Center, Richmond, as they pass through Bellwood. As they pass through Bensley, the U.S. Routes cross over Falling Creek, across which sits an abandoned bridge between the two carriageways.

North of Falling Creek, US 1 and US 301 expand to six lanes and have a cloverleaf interchange with SR 150 (Chippenham Parkway), which leads east to I-95 and SR 895 (Pocahontas Parkway), which leads to Richmond International Airport. Between SR 150 and SR 161 (Bells Road), the U.S. Routes enter the city of Richmond. US 1 and US 301 continue into the Manchester neighborhood, where the highways intersect US 360 (Hull Street) and veer onto Cowardin Avenue, which passes along the western edge of the Manchester Residential and Commercial Historic District. The highways intersect US 60 (Semmes Avenue), then veer north onto the Robert E. Lee Memorial Bridge, which the bifurcated James River and Belle Isle. The bridge also crosses Norfolk Southern Railway's Richmond District railyard on the south side of the river and CSX Transportation's Rivanna Subdivision on the north side. On either end of the bridge are partial interchanges: Riverside Drive on the south side of the river accessible from the southbound direction and Second Street from the northbound direction; Second Street leads to Downtown Richmond and the Tredegar Iron Works.

US 1 and US 301 follow Belvidere Street along the east side of Oregon Hill. The highways intersect Byrd and Cumberland streets, a one-way pair that provide access to SR 195 (Downtown Expressway) in between. US 1 and US 301 continue through the Monroe Park campus of Virginia Commonwealth University, within which the highways intersect SR 147—Cary Street eastbound and Main Street westbound—and veer northeast at Monroe Park. The U.S. Routes intersect US 250 (Broad Street) on the western edge of the Broad Street Commercial Historic District. US 1 and US 301 intersect SR 33 (Leigh Street) immediately before their incomplete partial cloverleaf interchange with I-64 and I-95 (Richmond–Petersburg Turnpike). There is no access from the southbound route to westbound I-64 and northbound I-95. Access to the U.S. Routes from that direction of the Interstate is via Chamberlayne Parkway, with which the routes have a partial interchange as they cross over CSX Transportation's Richmond Terminal Subdivision rail line.

=== Richmond to Fredericksburg ===
US 1 and US 301 continue along Chamberlayne Avenue through the northern part of the city. The highways reduce to four lanes and intersect SR 197 (Laburnum Avenue) within Ginter Park. At Azalea Avenue, US 301 and SR 2 continue straight on Chamberlayne Avenue; US 1 turns west onto Azalea Avenue, then north on Brook Road and leaves the city of Richmond and enters Henrico County. The highway has a partial interchange with I-95 (Richmond–Petersburg Turnpike) that allows access to southbound I-95 and from northbound I-95. US 1 becomes undivided north of the eastern end of SR 161 (Hillard Road) to the east of Lakeside. The route expands to a six-lane divided highway ahead of its intersection with Parham Road at Yellow Tavern; Parham Road heads east as SR 73, a connector between US 1 and I-95. US 1 has a cloverleaf interchange with I-295 between Glen Allen and the I-95–I-295 junction before the U.S. Route crosses the Chickahominy River into Hanover County.

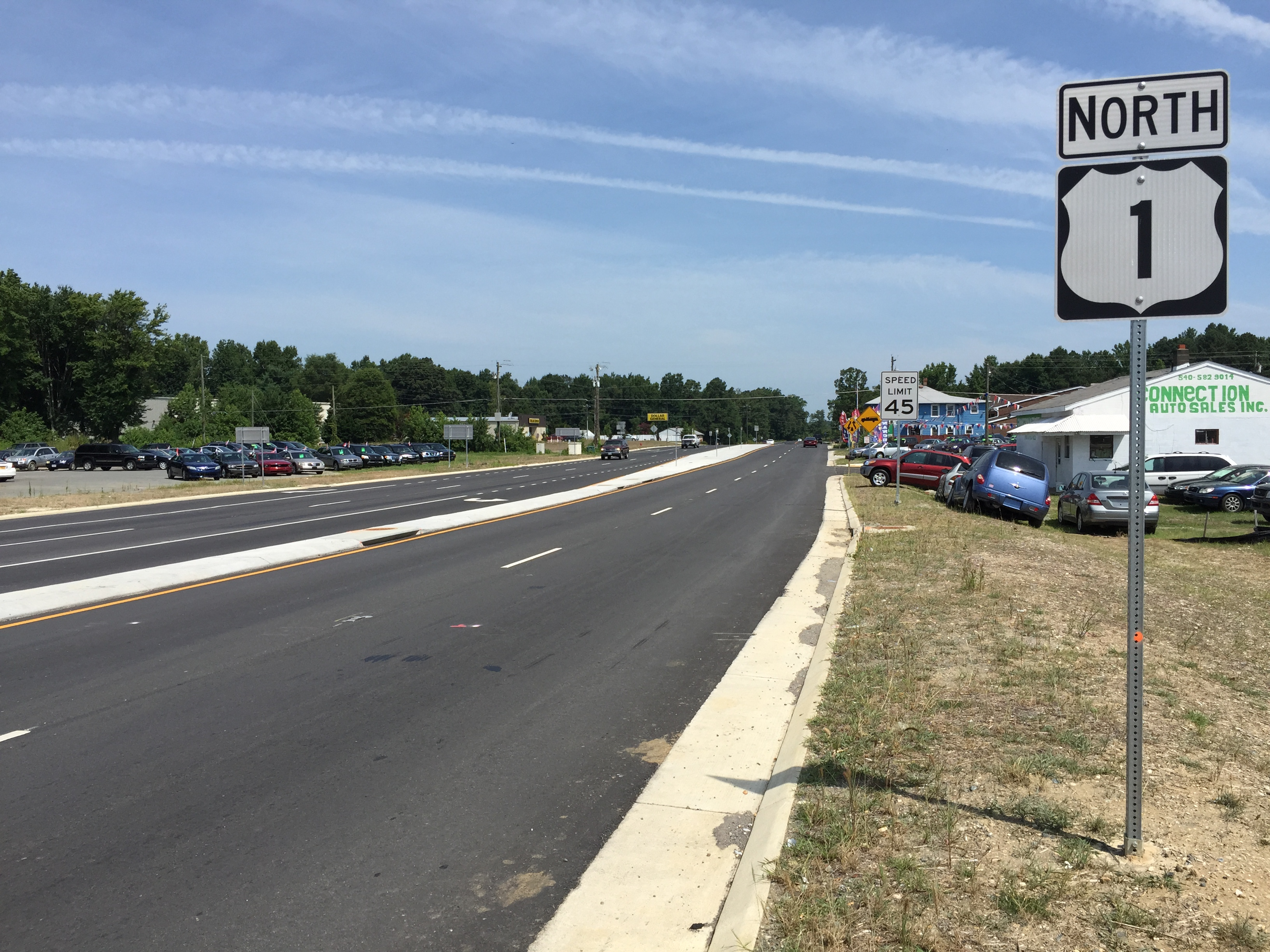
View north along US 1 in Thornburg

US 1's name changes to Washington Highway, and it becomes a four-lane undivided highway shortly after entering Hanover County. The highway has brief divided sections as it passes through the eastern part of town of Ashland. Within the town, US 1 intersects SR 54 (England Street) and passes to the east of the Ashland Historic District and Randolph–Macon College. After leaving Ashland, US 1 crosses to the west side of CSX Transportation's RF&P Subdivision and crosses over the South Anna River. North of the Little River, the route passes through Doswell, where it meets the western end of SR 30 (Kings Dominion Boulevard). US 1 crosses over the Piedmont Subdivision, which is owned by CSX Transportation and operated by Buckingham Branch Railroad, west of the Doswell Diamond, then briefly expands to a divided highway to cross the North Anna River into Caroline County. US 1 continues as Jefferson Davis Highway and meets the western end of SR 207 (Rogers Clark Boulevard) at the hamlet of Carmel Church west of Ruther Glen; SR 207 leads to US 301 at Bowling Green and thence along that U.S. Route to the Governor Harry W. Nice Memorial Bridge.

US 1 passes through Golansville, Ladysmith, and Cedon before entering Spotsylvania County. The highway crosses the Matta River south of Thornburg and the Po and Ni rivers to the north of the hamlet. US 1 passes through Massaponax, the site of Massaponax Baptist Church, then expands to a six-lane divided highway at Spotsylvania Parkway, which leads to Spotsylvania Regional Medical Center. The U.S. Route is joined by US 17 (Mills Drive) south of their five ramp partial cloverleaf interchange with I-95, where US 17 joins the Interstate to bypass Fredericksburg. US 1 continues with four lanes to Four Mile Fork, where the highway meets the northern end of SR 208 (Courthouse Road) and the southern end of US 1 Bus. (Lafayette Boulevard), which serves the Fredericksburg Historic District and the Fredericksburg Unit of Fredericksburg and Spotsylvania National Military Park. US 1 continues north flanked by service roads to where it enters the independent city of Fredericksburg. The highway meets SR 3 (William Street) at a cloverleaf interchange, passes under a pedestrian bridge along the edge of the University of Mary Washington, and crosses over the Rappahannock Canal. US 1 meets the northern end of US 1 Bus. and US 17 Bus. (Princess Anne Street) immediately before US 1 and US 17 Bus. cross the Rappahannock River into Stafford County.

=== Fredericksburg to the Arlington–DC border ===
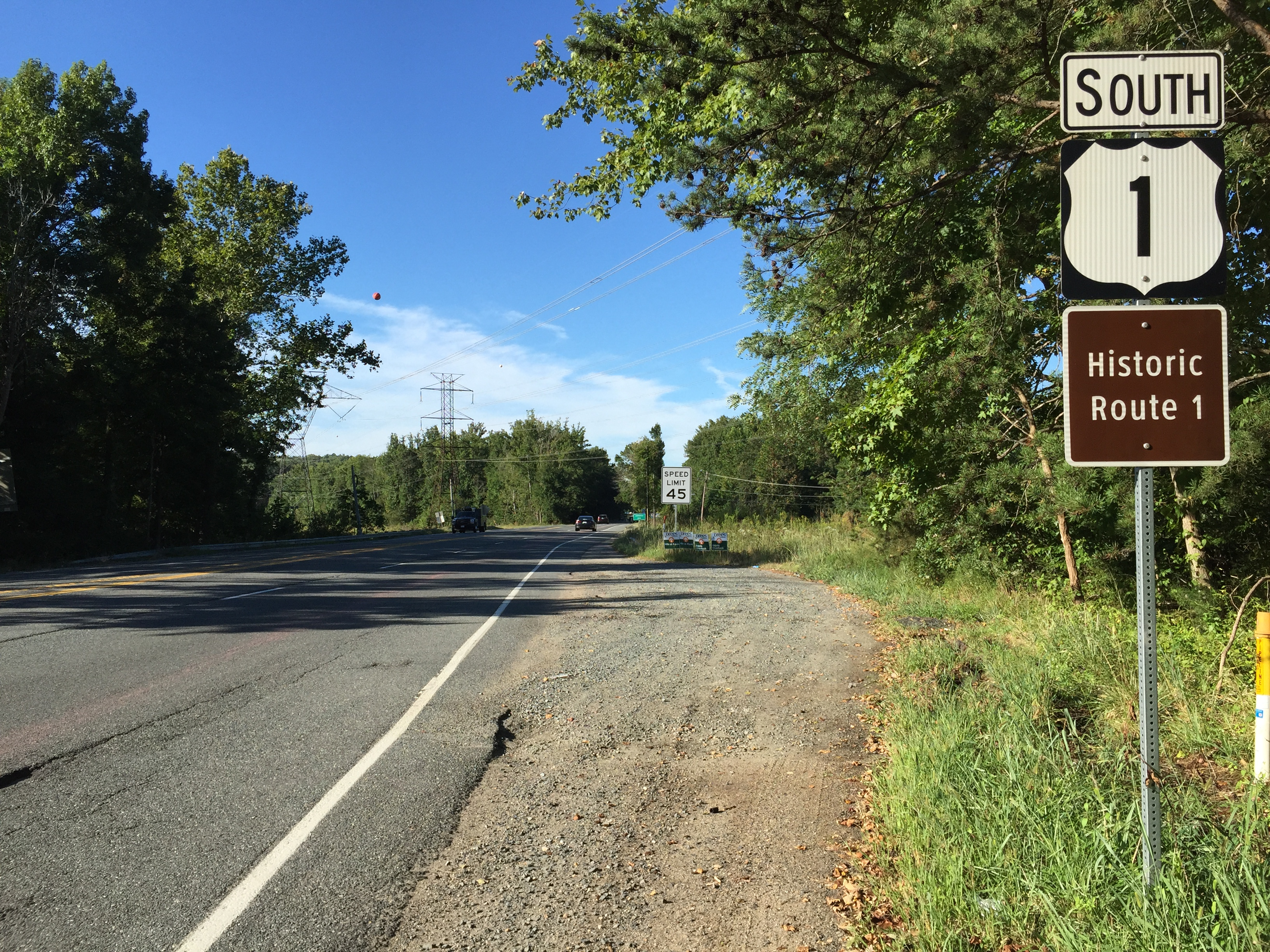
US 1 southbound in Stafford County

US 17 Bus. diverges onto Warrenton Road at a four-way intersection that also serves as the western end of SR 218 (Butler Road) in the center of Falmouth and its historic district, which contains Gari Melchers Home and Studio, Conway House, Union Church and Cemetery, Carlton, and Clearview. US 1 has a grade-separated junction with SR 8900 (Centreport Parkway), which serves Stafford Regional Airport, before crossing Potomac Creek. The highway passes Stafford Training School and passes through the county seat of Stafford. North of Stafford, the highway briefly divides into two carriageways with a wide median. The directions of US 1 come back together and approach I-95; ramps to and from northbound I-95 connect directly with US 1 as part of the Interstate's cloverleaf interchange with SR 610 (Garrisonville Road) just west of the historic Aquia Church. US 1 crosses Aquia Creek and passes through the village of Aquia.

North of Aquia, US 1 enters the property of Marine Corps Base Quantico, within which the highway crosses Chopawamsic Creek into Prince William County. Immediately north of the county line, the route has a partial cloverleaf interchange with Russell Road, a major highway within the military base. US 1 passes the National Museum of the Marine Corps before its intersection at Triangle with SR 619 (Fuller Road), which leads east to the town of Quantico. At SR 619, US 1 leaves the base property and briefly expands to a six-lane divided highway, then splits onto separate carriageways—Fraley Boulevard northbound and Main Street southbound—to pass through the town of Dumfries, within which the U.S. Route crosses Quantico Creek. The carriageways reunite and US 1 meets the eastern end of SR 234 (Dumfries Road) at the northern limit of the town. The Dumfries Road Commuter Lot, a park-and-ride facility, is located north of this intersection. US 1 crosses Neabsco Creek into the large unincorporated area of Woodbridge near the Woodbridge Campus of Northern Virginia Community College. The U.S. Route meets the eastern end of SR 294 (Prince William Parkway) and begins to parallel the RF&P Subdivision rail line. US 1 passes Woodbridge station, which is served by Amtrak and Virginia Railway Express, shortly before its junction with SR 123 (Gordon Boulevard). The highway then crosses the Occoquan River into Fairfax County.

US 1 continues as Richmond Highway through a partial interchange with I-95 at the southern end of Henry G. Shirley Memorial Highway. The interchange includes ramps from northbound US 1 to northbound I-95, southbound US 1 to southbound I-95, northbound I-95 to northbound US 1, and southbound I-95 to southbound US 1. At the north end of the interchange, US 1 passes under the RF&P Subdivision rail line and passes through the eastern fringe of Lorton, where it meets the northern end of SR 242 (Gunston Road). At Pohick Creek, the highway expands to six lanes and heads east and passes Pohick Church, then through Fort Belvoir. Within the military property, US 1 crosses Accotink Creek, meets the southern end of SR 286 (Fairfax County Parkway), and passes under an overpass of a road within the base. East of Fort Belvoir, the highway passes the historic plantation Woodlawn and the western end of SR 235 (Mount Vernon Memorial Highway), which leads to Mount Vernon. US 1 is reduced to a four-lane undivided highway before it crosses Dogue Creek and until it meets the eastern end of SR 235 (Mount Vernon Highway) just west of Little Hunting Creek.

US 1 expands to six lanes as it curves north through Hybla Valley and Groveton. On the southern edge of Huntington, the U.S. Route has a tangent intersection with Kings Highway, which heads north as SR 241. US 1 veers northeast and expands to eight lanes at Huntington Avenue and maintains that width until its major interchange with the Capital Beltway (I-95 and I-495) at Cameron Run on the boundary between Fairfax County and the independent city of Alexandria. The interchange includes several flyovers and provides partial access to the express and local lanes of the beltway in both directions. US 1 continues north as a six-lane divided Patrick Street into Old Town Alexandria, which, at Wilkes Street, splits into a one-way pair, Patrick Street northbound and Henry Street southbound. The highway intersects SR 236 (Duke Street) and SR 7 (King Street) within Old Town. North of Montgomery Street, the directions come together as Henry Street, which crosses the Monroe Avenue Bridge over the RF&P Subdivision rail line and the Washington Metro's Blue and Yellow lines.

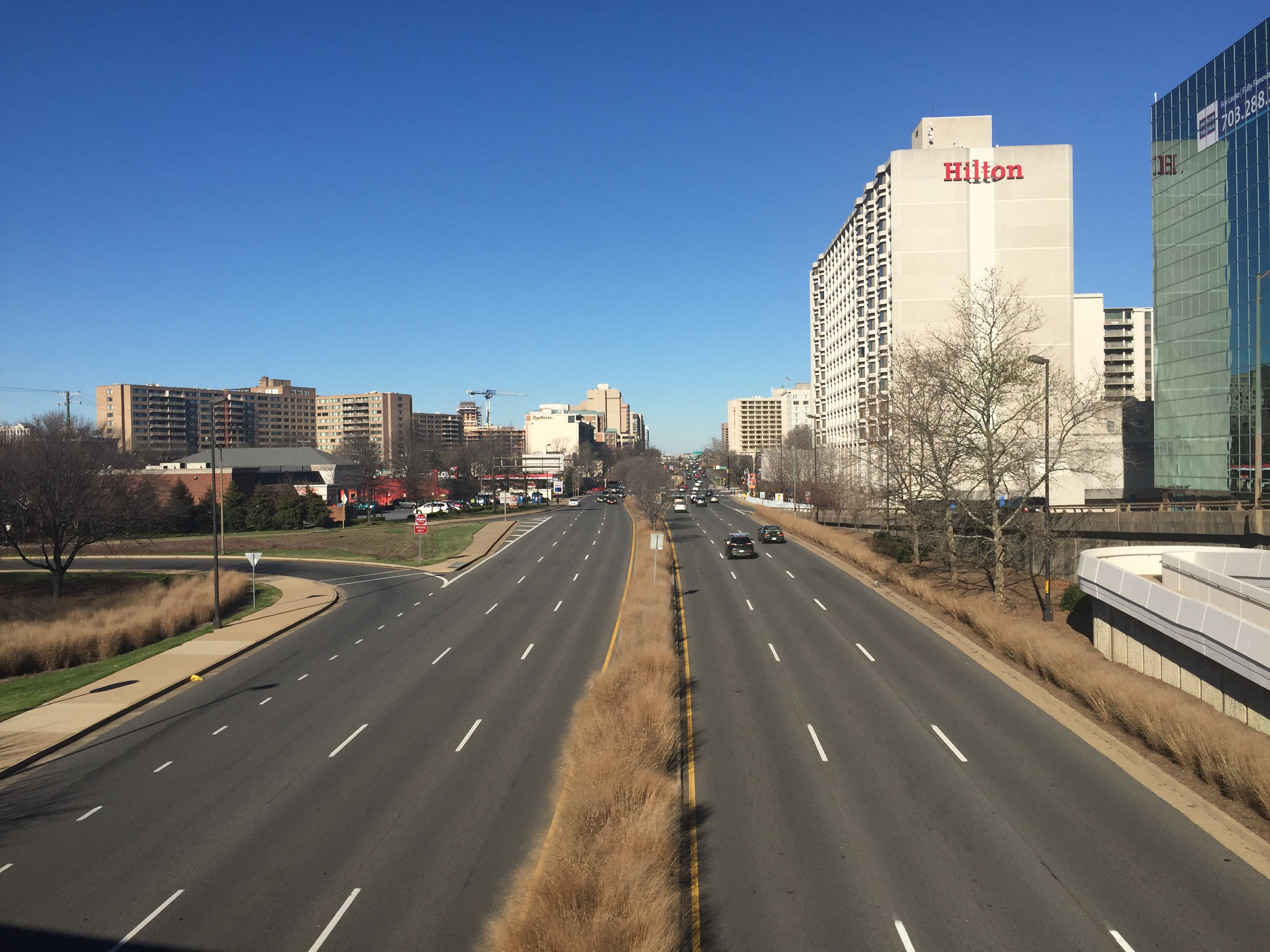
View north along US 1 in Crystal City

US 1 again becomes Richmond Highway (changed from Jefferson Davis Highway in 2019) north of the railroad tracks. The four-lane divided highway, which contains the Metroway bus rapid transit course in its median, passes between Potomac (and the Del Ray neighborhood) to the west and a large residential and commercial development built on what was formerly Potomac Yard to the east. Metroway merges with the main streams of US 1 traffic, which expand to three lanes each way as the highway approaches the northern city limit at Four Mile Run. The U.S. Route leaves Alexandria for Arlington County and has an intersection with the southern end of SR 120 (Glebe Road). US 1—again bearing the name Richmond Highway—continues through the urban village of Crystal City, where the highway has a trumpet interchange with SR 233, a connector to Ronald Reagan Washington National Airport. The route becomes a freeway north of 20th Street South and has a diamond interchange with 15th Street south on the eastern edge of Pentagon City. US 1 then joins I-395 on Henry G. Shirley Memorial Highway via a pair of flyover ramps; Richmond Highway continues north as SR 110, which passes by the Pentagon and Arlington National Cemetery on its way to Rosslyn. I-395 and US 1, which have 12 lanes over four carriageways, have a partial cloverleaf interchange with Clark Street and Boundary Channel Drive and another interchange with the George Washington Memorial Parkway before the two highways cross the Potomac River into the District of Columbia on the 14th Street bridges complex.

== History ==
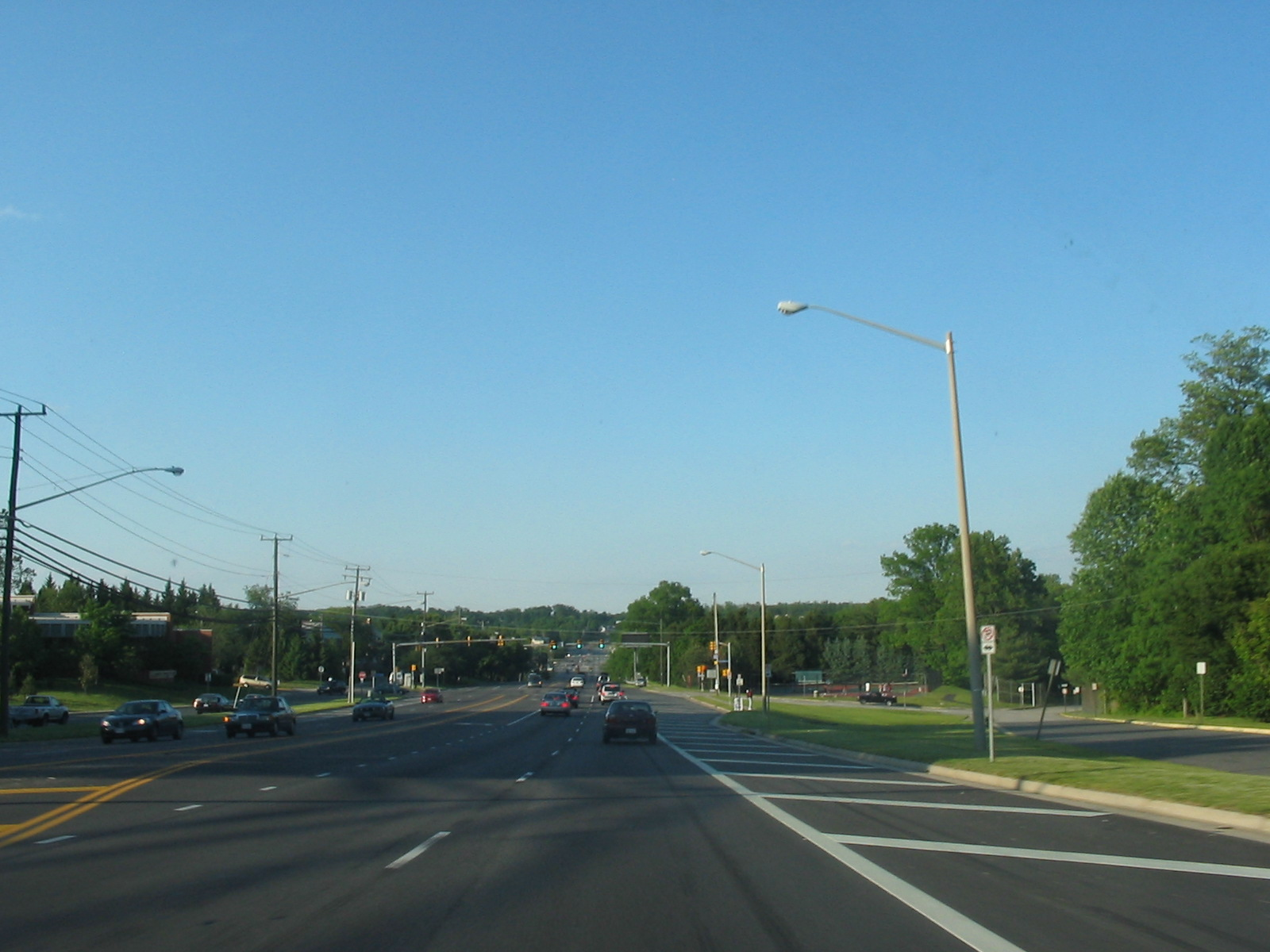
US 1 in Fairfax County near Alexandria

What is now US 1 was added to the state highway system in 1918 as State Route 1 (SR 1), following the older Jefferson Davis Highway, which approximated at its northern end the route of the former Washington and Alexandria Turnpike. The road was renumbered State Route 31 (SR 31) in the 1923 renumbering, and US 1 was applied to its whole length in 1926. SR 31 was dropped in the 1933 renumbering and was immediately reused on its current alignment.

Prior to c. 1924, SR 1/SR 31 crossed the North Carolina state line with SR 2/SR 32 south of Clarksville on present US 15. On the North Carolina side, it was North Carolina Highway 75 (NC 75). From Clarksville, it ran east on present US 58 to near South Hill. The route continued east from South Hill to Edgerton on present US 58 and north to near McKenney on present SR 712 until about the same time. This alignment was defined as the Jefferson Davis Highway on March 17, 1922.

By 1925, SR 31 was moved to the current alignment of US 1 south of McKenney (previously State Route 122 [SR 122] south of South Hill and State Route 314 [SR 314] north of South Hill), but the Jefferson Davis Highway did not follow. This took SR 31 to the border at what was then NC 50. The old alignment remained SR 32 south of Clarksville and SR 12 from Boydton to Edgerton and became SR 201 from Clarksville to Boydton and a new SR 122 from Edgerton to near McKenney.

The preliminary plan for U.S. Numbered Highways was drawn up in 1925, and all of SR 31 was assigned US 1. The former SR 31 west and south from near South Hill into North Carolina became US 401. In late 1926, the final plan was adopted, and all of US 401 was renumbered to US 15. However, by April 1927, US 15 had been extended north from Clarksville, and the short piece from Clarksville to near South Hill was again US 401.

In 1975, the interchange between I-395 and US 1 was rebuilt, and originally there were plans to upgrade US 1 to Interstate 595 (I-595) southward to the connector road with Ronald Reagan Washington National Airport. However, the upgrade as proposed was never built. Instead, US 1 is elevated with a diamond interchange over 15th Street South but is a surface road with signaled intersections at 20th Street South and further south.

The modern US 1 corridor was added to the state highway system as follows:

Portion	Creation	Number	Notes
North Carolina to South Hill	1922	SR 122 (1923–1925) → SR 31 (1925–1933)	
South Hill to Nottoway River Bridge	1924	SR 314 (1924–1925) → SR 31 (1925–1933)	
Nottoway River Bridge to Solomons Store	1918	SR 1 (1918–1923) → SR 31 (1923–1933)	
Solomons Store to Four Mile Fork	1924	SR 31 (1924–1933)	
Four Mile Fork to Washington DC	1918	SR 1 (1918–1923) → SR 31 (1923–1933)	Occoquan bypassed in 1926; former alignment renumbered SR 315

== Major intersections ==
County	Location	mi	km	Exit	Destinations	Notes
Mecklenburg		0.00	0.00		US 1 south – Norlina, Raleigh	Continuation into North Carolina
Mecklenburg	Big Fork	8.97	14.44		US 58 west – Boydton, Clarksville	Southern terminus of US 58 concurrency
Mecklenburg	South Hill	12.40	19.96		US 58 east – Emporia	Northern terminus of US 58 concurrency; southern terminus of US 58 Business concurrency
Mecklenburg	South Hill	15.21	24.48		US 58 Bus. east / SR 47 north (Atlantic Street) – Emporia, Chase City	Northern terminus of US 58 Business concurrency
Mecklenburg	South Hill				SR 138 north (Union Mill Road) – Kenbridge	Southern terminus of SR 138
Mecklenburg	South Hill	18.13	29.18		I-85 – Petersburg, Durham	I-85 exit 15
Brunswick	Cochran	29.79	47.94		SR 46 (Christianna Highway) – Lawrenceville, Blackstone	
Brunswick	Alberta	31.04	49.95		I-85 – South Hill, Petersburg	Exit 28 on I-85
Brunswick	Alberta				SR 136 west (Church Street)	Eastern terminus of SR 136
Dinwiddie	McKenney	45.20	72.74		SR 40 (Doyle Boulevard) – Blackstone, Fort Barfoot, Waverly, Stony Creek	
Dinwiddie		64.41	103.66		US 460 Bus. west (Airport Street) to I-85 / US 460 – Blackstone, Lynchburg	Southern terminus of US 460 Business concurrency
Dinwiddie					SR 142 east (Simpson Road)	Western terminus of SR 142
Dinwiddie		66.10	106.38		I-85 / US 460 to I-95 – Durham, South Hill, Farmville, Lynchburg	Exit 63 on I-85
Dinwiddie		67.33	108.36		SR 226 west (Cox Road)	Eastern terminus of SR 226
City of Petersburg		70.16	112.91		Market Street	Southern terminus of SR 36 concurrency (northbound)
City of Petersburg		70.36	113.23		US 301 Alt. south (Sycamore Street)	Southern terminus of US 301 Alternate concurrency
City of Petersburg		70.44	113.36		US 460 Bus. east / SR 36 east (Wythe Street)	Northern terminus of US 460 Business / SR 36 concurrency (northbound)
City of Petersburg		70.53	113.51		US 1 south / US 460 Bus. west (Washington Street)	Northern terminus of US 460 Business concurrency (southbound)
City of Petersburg		70.79	113.93		US 301 south (Bank Street)	Southern terminus of US 301 concurrency (southbound)
City of Petersburg		70.84	114.01		SR 36 west (Bollingbrook Street)	Northern terminus of US 301 Alternate; southern terminus of US 301 concurrency (northbound)
Appomattox River					Martin Luther King Jr. Memorial Bridge	
City of Colonial Heights		72.68	116.97		SR 144 south (Temple Avenue) – Hopewell	Southern terminus of SR 144 concurrency
Chesterfield	Pickadat Corner	74.62	120.09		SR 144 north (Harrowgate Road) – Chester	Northern terminus of SR 144 concurrency
Chesterfield	Chester	79.42	127.81		SR 10 (West Hundred Road) – Chester, Hopewell	
Chesterfield	Chester	81.07	130.47		SR 288 to I-95 / US 360 north / SR 76	Cloverleaf interchange
Chesterfield	Bellwood	83.33	134.11		SR 145 west (Chester Road) – Chester	
Chesterfield	Bensley	85.74	137.99		SR 150 (Chippenham Parkway) to I-95 / SR 895 – Richmond International Airport	Cloverleaf interchange
City of Richmond					SR 161 (Bells Road)	
City of Richmond		90.91	146.31		US 360 (Hull Street)	No left turn southbound
City of Richmond		91.30	146.93		US 60 (Semmes Avenue)	
City of Richmond					Riverside Drive	Southbound exit and northbound entrance
James River					Robert E. Lee Memorial Bridge	
City of Richmond		92.06	148.16		2nd Street north	Northbound exit and southbound entrance
City of Richmond					Byrd Street east to SR 195 east to I-64 east / I-95	
City of Richmond					Cumberland Street west to SR 195 west	
City of Richmond					SR 147 east (Cary Street)	
City of Richmond					SR 147 west (Main Street)	No left turn northbound
City of Richmond		93.13	149.88		US 250 (Broad Street)	
City of Richmond					SR 33 (Leigh Street)	
City of Richmond					I-64 / I-95 (Richmond–Petersburg Turnpike) – Washington, Charlottesville, Petersburg, Norfolk	Same-directional access only; exit 76 on I-95
City of Richmond		93.53	150.52		Chamberlayne Parkway	Southbound exit and northbound entrance
City of Richmond		95.72	154.05		SR 197 west (Laburnum Avenue)	Eastern terminus of SR 197
City of Richmond		96.92	155.98		US 301 north / SR 2 north (Chamberlayne Avenue)	Northern terminus of US 301 concurrency
Henrico	Lakeside	97.48	156.88		I-95 south (Richmond–Petersburg Turnpike) to I-64	Exit 81 on I-95; southbound exit and northbound entrance
Henrico	Lakeside	98.31	158.21		SR 161 south (Hilliard Road) – Greendale	Northern terminus of SR 161
Henrico	Yellow Tavern	99.51	160.15		SR 73 east (Parham Road) to I-95 / Parham Road west	
Henrico	Glen Allen	100.93	162.43		I-295 to I-64 / I-95 – Charlottesville, Norfolk, Rocky Mount, NC	Exits 43C-D on I-295
Hanover	Ashland	108.10	173.97		SR 54 (England Street) – Hanover, Montpelier	
Hanover	Doswell	114.33	184.00		SR 30 east (Kings Dominion Boulevard) – Kings Dominion	Western terminus of SR 30
Caroline	Ruther Glen	120.36	193.70		SR 207 east (Rogers Clark Boulevard) to I-95 / US 301 – Bowling Green	
Spotsylvania		141.37	227.51		US 17 south (Mills Drive) – Tappahannock	Southern terminus of US 17 concurrency
Spotsylvania		142.55	229.41		I-95 / US 17 north – Washington, Richmond	Northern terminus of US 17 concurrency; exit 126 on I-95
Spotsylvania	Four Mile Fork	143.51	230.96		US 1 Bus. north (Lafayette Boulevard) / SR 208 west (Courthouse Road) – Spotsylvania, Fredericksburg	
City of Fredericksburg		146.29	235.43		SR 3 (William Street) – Culpeper	Cloverleaf interchange
City of Fredericksburg		148.07	238.30		US 1 Bus. south / US 17 Bus. south (Princess Anne Street) to SR 2	Southern terminus of US 17 Business concurrency
Stafford	Falmouth	148.53	239.04		US 17 Bus. north (Warrenton Road) / SR 218 east (Butler Road) – Warrenton	Northern terminus of US 17 Business concurrency
Stafford	Aquia Harbor	159.36	256.47		I-95 / SR 610 (Garrisonville Road) – Garrisonville, Washington	Exit 143 on I-95; access to I-95 south via SR 610
Prince William	Quantico Station				Russell Road – Marine Corps Base Quantico	Partial cloverleaf interchange
Prince William	Triangle	166.24	267.54		SR 619 (Fuller Road) – Quantico, Prince William Forest Park	
Prince William	Dumfries	168.68	271.46		SR 234 north (Dumfries Road) – Manassas	Southern terminus of SR 234
Prince William	Woodbridge				SR 294 west (Prince William Parkway) – Manassas	Eastern terminus of SR 294
Prince William	Woodbridge				SR 123 north (Gordon Boulevard) – Occoquan	Southern terminus of SR 123
Occoquan River					Jefferson Davis Highway Bridge	
Fairfax	Lorton	176.99	284.84		I-95 – Richmond, Washington	Same-directional access only; exit 161 on I-95
Fairfax	Lorton	178.43	287.16		SR 242 east / SR 600 (Gunston Road) – Gunston Hall	Western terminus of SR 242
Fairfax	Fort Belvoir	181.95	292.82		SR 286 north (Fairfax County Parkway) to I-95	Southern terminus of SR 286
Fairfax	Fort Belvoir	183.80	295.80		SR 235 north (Mount Vernon Memorial Highway) – Mount Vernon	Southern terminus of SR 235
Fairfax	Mount Vernon	186.64	300.37		SR 235 south (Mount Vernon Highway) – Mount Vernon	Northern terminus of SR 235
Fairfax	Huntington	189.83	305.50		SR 241 north (Kings Highway)	Southern terminus of SR 241
City of Alexandria		191.14	307.61		I-95 / I-495 to I-295 / SR 241 – Baltimore, Richmond	Exits 177A-B on I-95 / I-495 (Capital Beltway)
City of Alexandria		191.98	308.96		Duke Street (SR 236)	Southbound left turn via u-turn
City of Alexandria		192.16	309.25		King Street (SR 7)	
Arlington	Crystal City	194.30	312.70		SR 120 north (South Glebe Road) to I-395	Southern terminus of SR 120
Arlington	Crystal City	194.95	313.74		SR 233 east – Reagan National Airport	Trumpet interchange; western terminus of SR 233
Arlington	Crystal City				15th Street South – Pentagon City	Diamond interchange
Arlington	Crystal City	195.82	315.14		SR 110 north to I-66 west – Rosslyn	Southbound access via I-395 south exit 8B; southern terminus of SR 110
Arlington	Crystal City	195.98	315.40	8C	I-395 south – Richmond	Southern terminus of I-395 (Shirley Highway) concurrency; southbound exit and northbound entrance
Arlington	Crystal City			9	Clark Street	Exit closed in 2023
Arlington	Crystal City			10A	Boundary Channel Drive – Pentagon North Parking	
Arlington	Long Bridge Park	196.53	316.28	10B-C	George Washington Parkway – Memorial Bridge, National Airport, Mount Vernon	Signed as exits 10B (south) and 10C (north)
Potomac River		196.55	316.32	—	I-395 north / US 1 north (14th Street Bridge) – Washington	Continuation into the District of Columbia
1.000 mi = 1.609 km; 1.000 km = 0.621 mi: Closed/former; Concurrency terminus; Incomplete access

== See also ==
Spurs of US 1 in Virginia

- US 301
  - The 1925 plan for US 301 became part of US 17 in 1926.
- US 401 (now part of US 58)
  - The 1925 plan for US 401 became part of US 15 in 1926.
- US 501

Spurs of SR 31 between 1923 and 1928

- SR 311, Ashland east and north to Corbin, now SR 54 and SR 2
- SR 312, Gum Tree west, north, and northeast to Four Mile Fork, now SR 738 and part of SR 208
- SR 313, Chimney Corner west to Chesterfield, now SR 145
- SR 314, South Hill northeast toward McKenney, now US 1; later a short spur south to Mount Vernon, now part of SR 235
- SR 316, Chester east toward Hopewell, now part of SR 10

U.S. Route 1
Previous state: North Carolina	Virginia	Next state: District of Columbia

< SR 30	Two‑digit State Routes; 1923-1933	SR 32 >
