= Virginia State Route 657 =

State highway in Virginia, United States

State Route 657

Route information
- Maintained by VDOT

Location
- Country: United States
- State: Virginia

Highway system
- Virginia Routes; Interstate; US; Primary; Secondary; Byways; History; HOT lanes

State Route 657 (SR 657) in the U.S. state of Virginia is a secondary route designation applied to multiple discontinuous road segments among the many counties. The list below describes the sections in each county that are designated SR 657.

== List ==
County	Length (mi)	Length (km)	From	Via	To	Notes
Accomack	6.21	9.99	Dead End	Deep Creek Road Merry Branch Road Edgar Thomas Road	US 13 (Lankford Highway)	Gap between segments ending at different points along SR 648
Albemarle	1.46	2.35	Cul-de-Sac	Lambs Road	SR 743 (Hydraulic Road)	
Alleghany	2.99	4.81	SR 18 (Potts Creek Road)	Pitzer Ridge Road	Covington city limits	
Amelia	3.72	5.99	Dead End	Selma Road	SR 645 (Soap Stone Road)	Gap between segments ending at different points along SR 616
Amherst	4.62	7.44	SR 636 (High Peak Road)	Laurel Cliff Road Cedar Gate Road Rothwood Road	SR 604 (Coolwell Road)	Gap between segments ending at different points along US 29 Bus
Appomattox	1.70	2.74	SR 656 (Horseshoe Road)	Vermillon Road	SR 608 (Piney Mountain Road)	
Augusta	6.22	10.01	US 11 (Lee Jackson Highway)	Indian Ridge Road	US 340 (Stuarts Draft Highway)	
Bath	0.50	0.80	Dead End	Pheasanty Hollow Road	SR 614 (Muddy Run Road)	
Bedford	7.20	11.59	SR 644 (Coffee Road)	Rocky Mountain Road	US 501 (Lee Jackson Highway)	
Bland	0.25	0.40	SR 614 (Grapefield Road)	Villa Heights Drive	Dead End	
Botetourt	2.01	3.23	SR 771 (Lakeridge Circle)	Rainbow Forest Drive	SR 652 (Mountain Pass Road)	
Brunswick	6.04	9.72	SR 1504 (Dugger Street)	High Street Dornia Avenue Tanner Town Road	US 1 (Boydton Plank Road)	Gap between segments ending at different points along US 58
Buchanan	7.10	11.43	SR 600 (Hurricane Road)	Back Hurricane Road	SR 620 (Deskins Road)	
Buckingham	2.89	4.65	SR 658 (Saint Andrews Road)	Spencer Road	SR 659 (Ranson Road)	
Campbell	2.39	3.85	Dead End	Booth Road	SR 646 (Spring Mill Road)	
Caroline	2.72	4.38	US 1 (Jefferson Davis Highway)	Telegraph Road	US 1 (Jefferson Davis Highway)	
Carroll	0.73	1.17	US 58 (Danville Pike)	Link Road Link Drive Rollingwood Drive	Dead End	
Charlotte	0.80	1.29	SR 649 (Germantown Road)	Bradner Road	Dead End	
Chesterfield	3.80	6.12	SR 602 (River Road)	Ivey Mill Road	SR 602 (River Road)	
Clarke	6.32	10.17	Frederick County line	Senseny Road	US 340 (Lord Fairfax Highway)	
Craig	0.30	0.48	Dead End	Angus Lane	SR 612 (Scenic View Lane/Angus Lane)	
Culpeper	5.05	8.13	US 15 (James Madison Highway)	General Winder Road Old Mill Road Allens Lane	SR 603 (White Shop Road)	Gap between a dead end and Madison County line/SR 618 (Waylands Mill Road)
Cumberland	3.57	5.75	SR 600 (River Road)	Jamestown Road	SR 45 (Cumberland Road)	
Dickenson	5.30	8.53	Russell County line	East Hazel Mountain Road	SR 600 (Wilder Road)	
Dinwiddie	2.10	3.38	US 1 (Boydton Plank Road)	Keelers Mill Road	SR 647 (Nash Road)	
Essex	1.10	1.77	Dead End	Marsh Street	Dead End	
Fairfax	8.43	13.57	SR 28 (Sully Road)/SR 620 (Braddock Road)	Walney Road Centreville Road	Herndon town limits/SR 228 (Elden Street)	
Fauquier	1.10	1.77	SR 658 (Cemetery Road)	Kings Hill Road	US 15/SR 28	
Floyd	0.40	0.64	Dead End	Weddle Road	SR 799 (Conner Grove Road)	
Fluvanna	1.08	1.74	Dead End	Bremo Bluff Road	US 15 (James Madison Highway)	
Franklin	4.75	7.64	SR 116/SR 975	Crowell Gap Road Red Valley Road Crowell Gap Road	Roanoke County line	Gap between segments ending at different points along SR 684
Frederick	3.67	5.91	Winchester city limits	Senseny Road	Clarke County line	
Giles	0.12	0.19	SR 660 (Staffordsville Road)	Perdue Road	Dead End	
Gloucester	0.60	0.97	Dead End	Johns Point Road	SR 629 (Free School Road)	
Goochland	0.50	0.80	SR 670 (Cardwell Road)	Sargent Road	Dead End	
Grayson	2.40	3.86	US 21 (Elk Creek Parkway)	Wagon Wheel Road Unnamed road	SR 656 (Pilgrim Fork Road)	
Greene	0.60	0.97	Orange County line	Albano Road	SR 610 (Toms Road)	
Greensville	0.80	1.29	US 301 (Skippers Road)	Liberty Road	Dead End	
Halifax	1.80	2.90	SR 667 (Leda Road)	Felix Road	SR 650 (Mulberry Road)	
Hanover	18.32	29.48	US 33 (Mountain Road)	Greenwood Church Road Ashcake Road Peaks Road	US 301 (Hanover Courthouse Road)	Gap between segments ending at different points along the Ashland town limits
Henry	14.28	22.98	US 220 (Virginia Avenue)	Rockwood Park Road Old Quarry Road Dyers Store Road	SR 57 (Chatham Road)	Gap between segments ending at different points along SR 890
Highland	0.37	0.60	Dead End	Unnamed road	SR 641	
Isle of Wight	0.90	1.45	SR 603 (Blackwater Road)	Antioch Road	SR 638 (Mill Creek Drive)	
James City	1.30	2.09	Dead End	Ivy Hill Road	US 60 (Richmond Road)	
King and Queen	1.28	2.06	Dead End	Limehouse Road	SR 14 (The Trail)	
King George	0.75	1.21	Dead End	Chastine Drive	SR 3 (Kings Highway)	
King William	0.80	1.29	Dead End	Elsassar Road	SR 632 (Mount Olive-Cohoke Road)	
Lancaster	0.11	0.18	Dead End	Rappahannock Road	SR 633 (Carters Creek Road)	
Lee	5.88	9.46	SR 661 (Flatwoods Road)	Tobacco Road Unnamed road Russells Chapel Road Tobacco Road	SR 621 (Left Poor Valley Road)	Gap between segments ending at different points along SR 880 Gap between segments ending at different points along SR 659
Loudoun	4.30	6.92	US 15 (James Monroe Highway)	Spinks Ferry Road	Dead End	Gap between segments ending at different points along SR 661
Louisa	2.40	3.86	US 522 (Cross County Road)	Apple Grove Road	US 33 (Jefferson Highway)	
Lunenburg	1.50	2.41	Dead End	Wilburn Drive	SR 655 (Plank Road)	
Madison	4.40	7.08	Dead End	Edgwood School Lane Thrift Road	US 29 Bus (Main Street)	Gap between segments ending at different points along SR 230
Mathews	1.10	1.77	SR 14 (John Clayton Memorial Highway)	Bookers Lane	Dead End	
Mecklenburg	3.30	5.31	SR 664 (Union Level Road)	Miles Creek Road	SR 655 (Skyline Road)	
Middlesex	1.09	1.75	SR 3 (Greys Point Road)	Kates Neck Road	Dead End	
Montgomery	5.44	8.75	SR 733 (Huff Lane)	Merrimac Road Walnut Spring Road	Dead End	Gap between segments ending at different points along SR 685
Nelson	9.18	14.77	Amherst County line	Piedmont Road Tye River Road	SR 739 (Tye River Road/Boxwood Farm Road)	
New Kent	0.25	0.40	US 60 (Pocahontas Trail)	Foxwell Road	Dead End	
Northampton	1.75	2.82	Dead End	Sparrow Point Road	SR 619 (Church Neck Road)	
Northumberland	3.14	5.05	Dead End	Fleeton Wharf Road Fleeton Road	US 360 (Main Street/Northumberland Highway)	
Nottoway	0.70	1.13	Prince Edward County line	Morning Star Road	SR 624 (Cary Shop Road)	
Orange	4.30	6.92	US 33 (Spotswood Trail)	Albano Road	Greene County line	
Page	0.90	1.45	SR 656	Lyn-mar Road	SR 658	
Patrick	1.95	3.14	North Carolina state line	Black Jack Road	SR 8 (Salem Highway)	
Pittsylvania	2.05	3.30	Dead End	North Briar Mountain Road	SR 807 (Triangle School Road)	
Powhatan	0.80	1.29	SR 614 (Judes Ferry Road)	John Tree Hill Road	Dead End	
Prince Edward	4.81	7.74	US 460 (Prince Edward Highway)	Sulphur Spring Road Hendricks Road	Dead End	
Prince George	0.11	0.18	Dead End	Enterprise Drive	US 460 (County Drive)	
Prince William	4.93	7.93	SR 605 (Fauquier Drive)	Reid Lane Pioneer Road	Dead End	Gap between segments ending at different points along SR 652
Pulaski	0.30	0.48	SR 658 (Delton Road)	Worrell Road	Dead End	
Rappahannock	0.28	0.45	SR 664 (Huntly Road)	Sandy Hook Road	Dead End	
Richmond	0.90	1.45	Dead End	Little Florida Road	SR 610 (Laurel Grove Road)	
Roanoke	2.22	3.57	Dead End	Winter Drive Crowell Gap Road	Franklin County line	
Rockbridge	4.00	6.44	Dead End	Unnamed road Green Hill Road Blacks Creek Road Unnamed road	Dead End	
Rockingham	1.10	1.77	SR 708 (Goods Mill Road)	Longley Road	SR 655 (Lawyer Road)	
Russell	16.31	26.25	Dickenson County line	Unnamed road Church Hill Road East Crossroads Drive Green Valley Road Green Valley Drive	SR 656 (Elk Garden Road)	Gap between SR 616 and US 58 Alt Gap between SR 841 and US 19
Scott	1.80	2.90	SR 619	Unnamed road	Dead End	
Shenandoah	2.60	4.18	SR 642 (Dean Road)	Maurertown Road Powhatan Road	SR 600 (Zepp Road)	Gap between segments ending at different points along US 11/SR 654
Smyth	4.50	7.24	SR 650 (South Fork Road)	Thomas Bridge Road	SR 645	Gap between segments ending at different points along SR 660
Southampton	7.10	11.43	SR 693 (Garris Mill Road)	Angelico Road	SR 652 (Old Belfield Road)	Gap between segments ending at different points along SR 658 Gap between segments ending at different points along SR 653
Spotsylvania	3.40	5.47	SR 614 (Dickerson Road)	Edenton Road	SR 738 (Partlow Road)	
Stafford	0.63	1.01	Dead End	Musselman Road	Dead End	
Surry	0.24	0.39	SR 634 (Alliance Road)	Chestnut Farm Circle	Dead End	
Sussex	5.82	9.37	SR 681 (Concord Sappony Road)	Palestine Road Main Street Unnamed road Gallary Road	SR 602 (Saint Johns Church Road)	Gap between segments ending at different points along SR 40 Bus
Tazewell	2.50	4.02	SR 644 (Bossevain Road)	Laurel Creek Road	West Virginia state line	
Warren	0.07	0.11	Dead End	Station Lane	SR 638	
Washington	4.45	7.16	SR 645 (Wallace Pike)	Rocky Hill Road Reedy Creek Road	SR 661 (Black Hollow Road)	Gap between segments ending at different points along SR 659 Gap between segments ending at different points along SR 625
Westmoreland	1.39	2.24	Dead End	Macedonia Lane	SR 631 (Longfield Road)	
Wise	2.14	3.44	Dead End	Unnamed road	US 58 Alt	
York	0.50	0.80	SR 617 (Railway Road)	Wynne Road	Dead End	
