= VA7 =

VA-7 has the following meanings:

- Virginia State Route 7
- Virginia's 7th congressional district
