= Loudoun County Parkway =

Loudoun County Parkway
- State Routes 606 and 607

Route information
- Length: 13.6 mi (21.9 km)
- Component highways: SR 606 from South Riding to Arcola; SR 607 from Arcola to Ashburn

Major junctions
- South end: SR 620 / SR 613 in South Riding
- US 50 in South Riding SR 267 Toll in Ashburn; SR 7 in Ashburn
- North end: Intersection with Riverside Parkway and George Washington Boulevard in Ashburn

Location
- Country: United States
- State: Virginia
- Counties: Loudoun

Highway system
- Virginia Routes; Interstate; US; Primary; Secondary; Byways; History; HOT lanes

The Loudoun County Parkway is a secondary state highway in eastern Loudoun County, Virginia. The southern portion is signed as State Route 606 from Braddock Road north to Old Ox Road, with the remainder signed as State Route 607.

== Route description ==
=== South Riding and Arcola ===
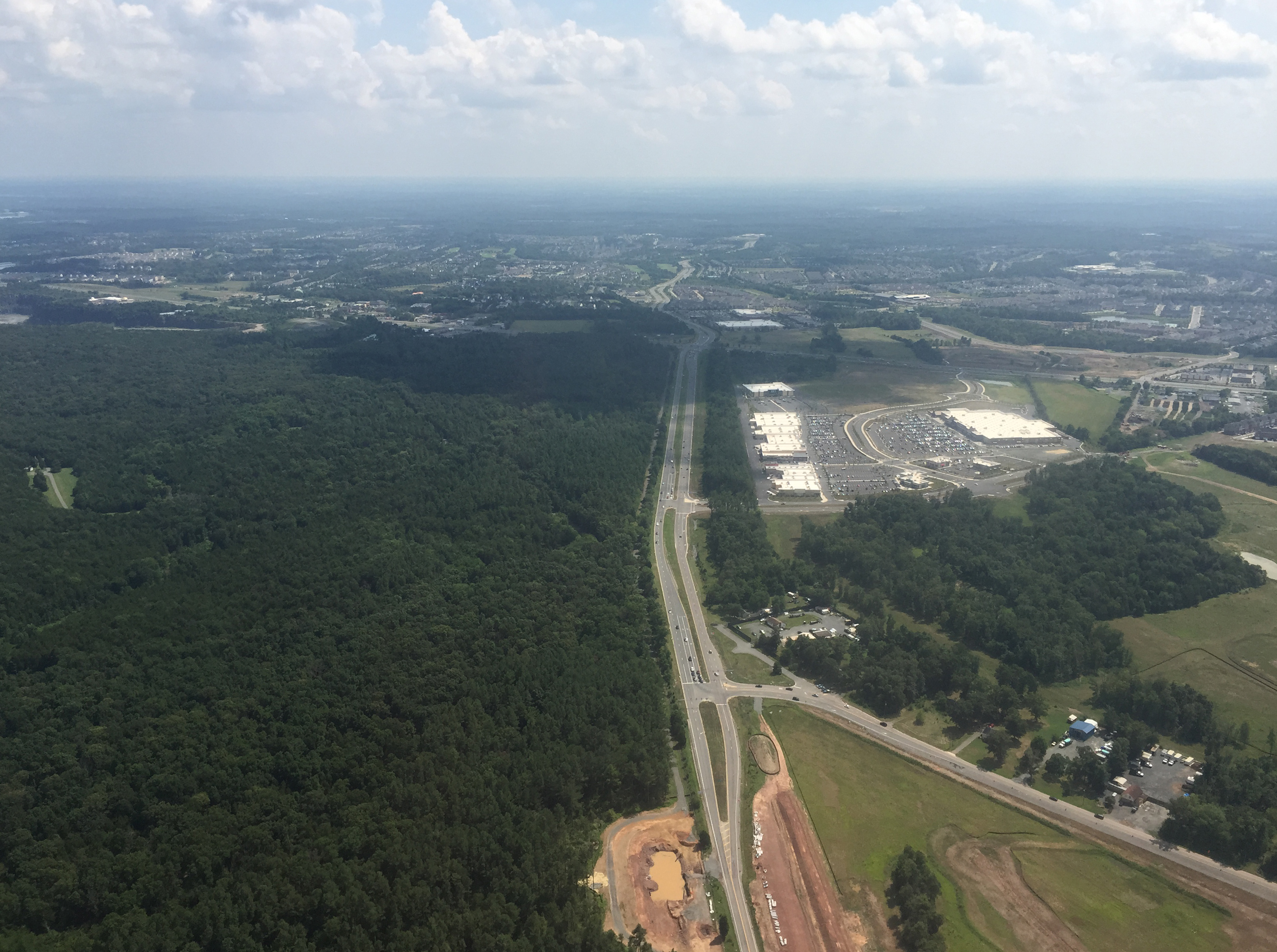
View southwest along SR 606 (Loudoun County Parkway) in Arcola from an airplane

Loudoun County Parkway begins at Braddock Road in South Riding. It then has an intersection with Tall Cedars Parkway. Then, Riding Center Drive, which takes you to Freedom High School. The road then continues north across U.S. Route 50. The parkway continues north along the western boundary of Washington Dulles International Airport to the intersection of Old Ox Road. The road now goes north towards Loudoun Valley Estates in Ashburn. The parkway then heads north towards Ryan Road.

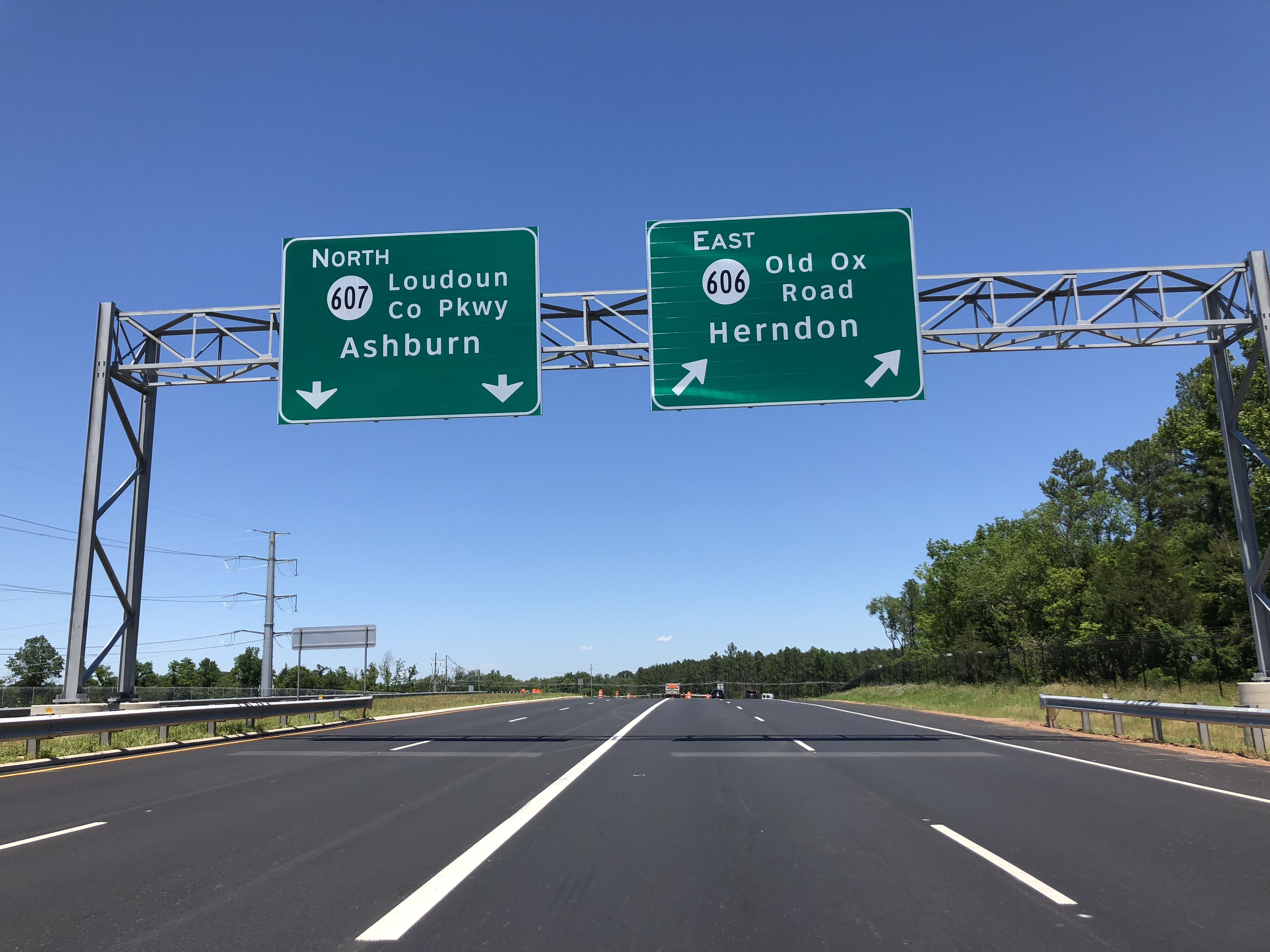
View northeast approaching the transition between SR 606 and SR 607 in Arcola

=== Brambleton and Ashburn ===
At Old Ox Road, SR 606 transitions onto Old Ox Road and the SR 607 designation begins for the Loudoun County Parkway. The parkway continues north to a partially-tolled interchange with the Dulles Greenway. The parkway heads north over the Greenway, and past the Verizon campus. After crossing Waxpool Road, the parkway continues north through corporate centers and Redskins Park. This section was once called Panorama Parkway. Until 2006, the section from Smith Switch Road to State Route 7 was an unpaved dirt road, but was rebuilt in 2006 as a four-lane divided highway as part of the Route 28 Improvement Project. As of 2012, Smith Switch Road no longer intersects directly with Loudoun County Parkway; instead it runs into the extension eastward of Gloucester Parkway that intersects Loudoun County Parkway. The parkway meets SR 7 (Leesburg Pike) at an unnumbered SPUI interchange. Just north of there, the parkway terminates at an intersection with George Washington Boulevard, which serves the George Washington University Virginia Campus. The roadway continues as Riverside Parkway, which parallels SR 7 on its north side west towards Leesburg.

== Major Construction Projects ==
Until 2017, a large gap existed in Loudoun County Parkway between Evergreen Ridge Drive in Ashburn, and Arcola Mills Drive(formerly Evergreen Mills Road), in Arcola. The road was constructed between these roads and opened in 2017, which created new intersections with Creighton Road, Evergreen Mills Road(formerly Shreveport Drive), Arcola Mills Drive(formerly Evergreen Mills Road), and a new interchange/signalized intersection with Old Ox road. This project also widened the road south of Old Ox Road to three lanes on the southbound side, and widened Old Ox Road(Route 606) to two lanes on both sides. In 2023, Loudoun County Parkway was widened from 4 to 6 lanes between Ryan Road and Shellhorn Road in Ashburn.

== Major intersections ==
The entire route is in Loudoun County.

Location	mi	km	Destinations	Notes
South Riding	0.0	0.0	SR 620 (Braddock Road) / SR 613 south (Ticonderoga Road)	Southern terminus of SR 606
Arcola	2.1	3.4	US 50 (John Mosby Highway, Little River Turnpike)	
Arcola	3.0	4.8	Evergreen Mills Road (SR 621 west)	Eastern terminus of SR 621
Arcola	3.7	6.0	SR 606 east (Old Ox Road) – Herndon	Route transition between SR 606 and SR 607; future intersection with SR 842 (Arcola Bouevard)
Brambleton	4.8	7.7	Creighton Road (SR 774 west)	Eastern terminus of SR 774
	6.6	10.6	Ryan Road (SR 772 west)	Eastern terminus of SR 772
Ashburn	8.2	13.2	SR 267 Toll (Dulles Greenway) – Washington, Leesburg	Toll on ramp to SR 267 west and from SR 267 east; exit 7 on SR 267
Ashburn	8.5	13.7	Shellhorn Road (SR 643 west)	Eastern terminus of SR 643
Ashburn	9.9	15.9	SR 625 (Waxpool Road)	
Ashburn	13.3	21.4	SR 7 East- Tysons, Sterling, West- Leesburg, Winchester, Frederick	SPUI with Harry Byrd Highway
Ashburn	13.6	21.9	George Washington Boulevard, Riverside Parkway	Northern terminus of SR 607; to George Washington University Virginia Campus, Leesburg
1.000 mi = 1.609 km; 1.000 km = 0.621 mi: Tolled; Route transition

== Plane Crash ==
On January 19, 2024, Southern Airways Express Flight 246 took off from Dulles International Airport and was on its way to Lancaster Airport (Pennsylvania) when it made an emergency landing due to bad weather. None of the seven people on board were killed or injured. The plane struck a guardrail as it performed an emergency landing. There was a snowstorm the day of, which caused the bad weather mentioned. The incident was covered by many local news outlets.
