= Virginia State Route 657 (Fairfax County) =

State highway in Virginia, United States

State Route 657

Route information
- Maintained by VDOT
- Length: 8.4 mi (13.5 km) Walney Road: 3.4 mi. Centreville Road: 5.0 mi.

Major junctions
- South end: SR 28 (Sully Road) in Centreville–Chantilly
- SR 662 (Westfields Boulevard) in Chantilly US 50 (Lee-Jackson Memorial Highway) in Chantilly SR 267 (Dulles Toll Road) near Herndon
- North end: SR 228 (Elden Street) in Herndon

Location
- Country: United States
- State: Virginia

Highway system
- Virginia Routes; Interstate; US; Primary; Secondary; Byways; History; HOT lanes

State Route 657 in Fairfax County, Virginia is a secondary state highway which traverses the western portion of the county. It runs 8.4 miles from SR 28 near the boundary between Centreville and Chantilly to SR 228 at the town limits of Herndon.

== Route description ==
SR 657 uses two different names: Walney Road and Centreville Road.

=== Walney Road ===
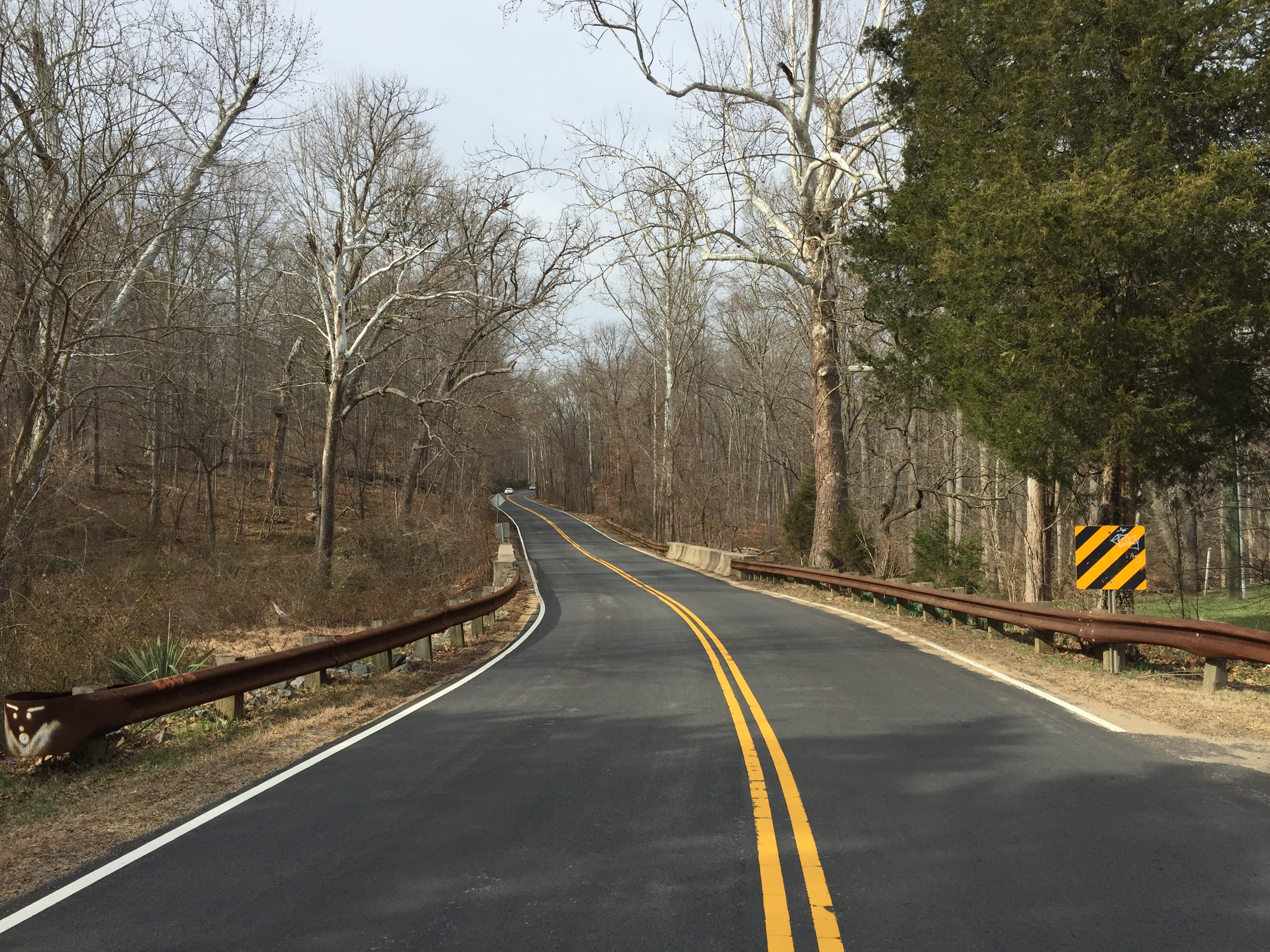
View north along Walney Road in Ellanor C. Lawrence Park

The southern terminus of SR 657 is at SR 28 (Sully Road), just north of Interstate 66. The terminus is a Right-in/right-out intersection that only allows traffic from and to northbound SR 28. Walney Road is a two-lane undivided road for most of its length, widening to a four-lane divided highway about 0.3 miles south of US 50.

The southern section of Walney Road passes through Ellanor C. Lawrence Park. North of the park, Walney Road tends to divide business parks from residential areas before ending in the traditional center of Chantilly at US 50.

=== Centreville Road ===
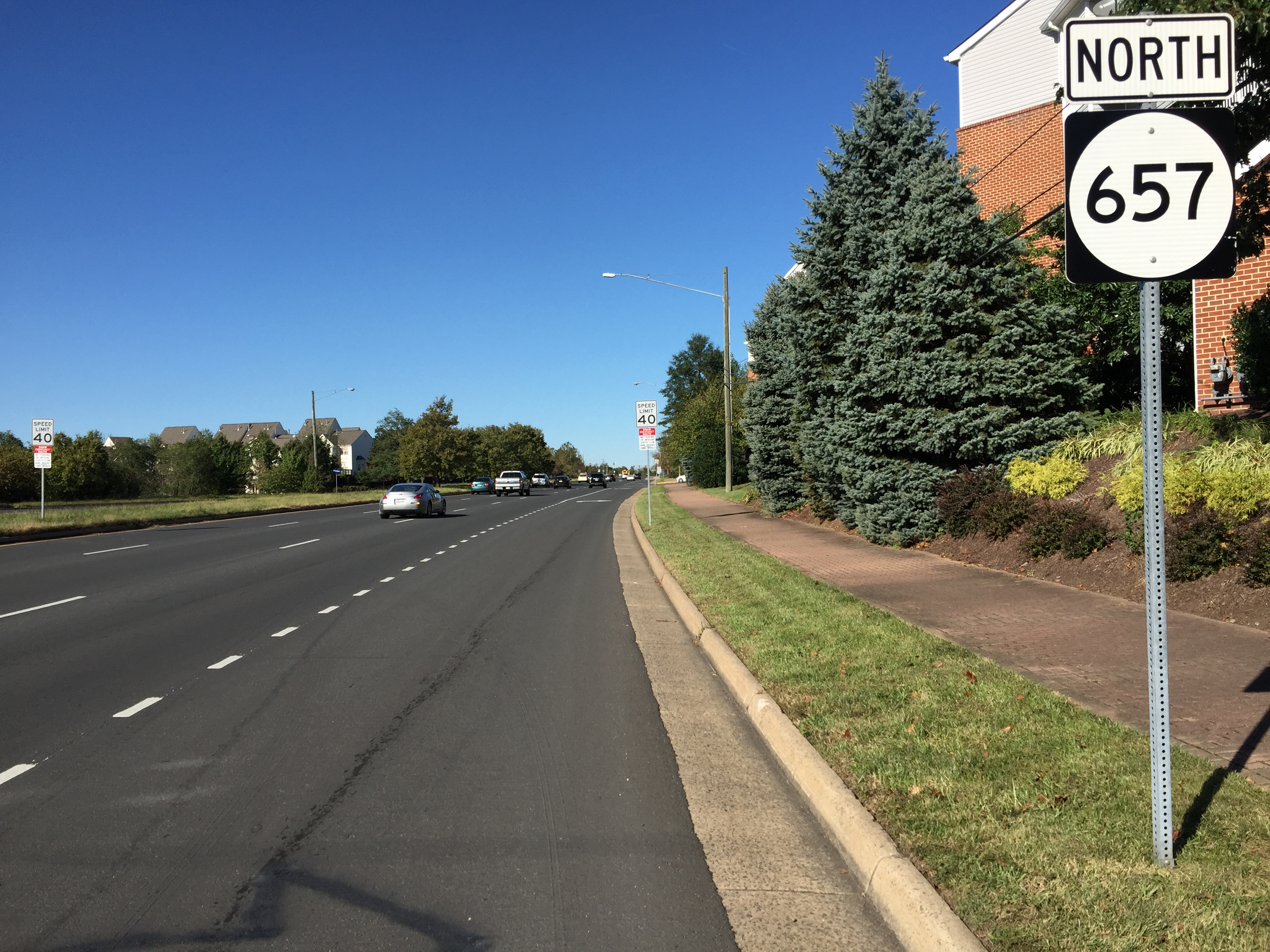
View north along SR 657 (Centreville Road) at Frying Pan Road in the McNair section of Oak Hill.

North of US 50, SR 657 becomes Centreville Road, a divided highway, mostly four lanes wide except at its northern end. There are commercial districts at the southern and northern ends; otherwise most of Centreville Road also divides business parks from residential areas.

SR 657 ends by changing into SR 228 at the southern town limit of Herndon between Parcher Avenue and Herndon Parkway. The street name also changes at the town line (to Elden Street). This is about 0.3 miles north of the SR 267 interchange.

== History ==
SR 657 was the primary travel route between Centreville and Herndon for much of the 20th century. From September 1961 to August 1966, the section south of US 50 was part of SR 28.

== Major intersections ==
The entire route is in Fairfax County.

| Location | mi | km | Destinations | Notes |
|---|---|---|---|---|
| | 0.0 | 0.0 | SR 28 north (Sully Road) | no left turn to or from SR 28 |
| Chantilly | 2.3 | 3.7 | SR 662 (Westfields Boulevard) | |
| Chantilly | 3.4 | 5.5 | US 50 (Lee Jackson Memorial Highway) | |
| | 8.1 | 13.0 | SR 267 – Dulles Airport, Washington | SR 267 exit 10 |
| Herndon | 8.4 | 13.5 | SR 228 north (Elden Street) | Herndon town limits |
1.000 mi = 1.609 km; 1.000 km = 0.621 mi
