= Virginia State Route 620 (Fairfax and Loudoun Counties) =

Highway in Virginia

State Route 620

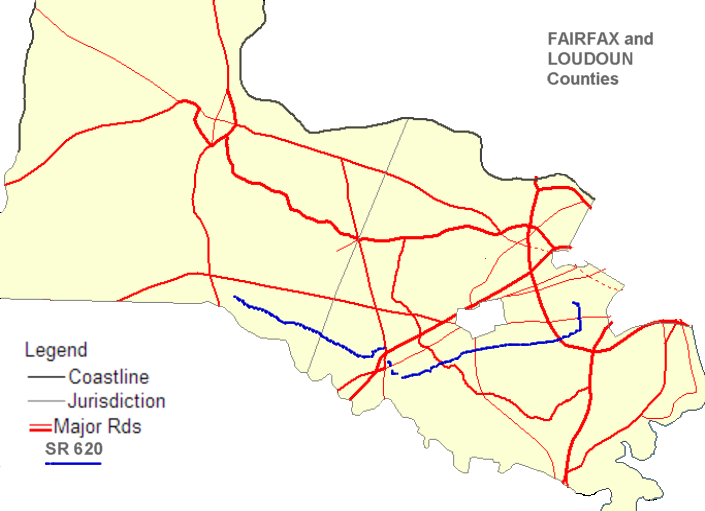

Route information
- Maintained by VDOT
- Length: 27.71 mi (44.59 km) 22.28 mi in Fairfax County; 5.28 mi. in Loudoun County

Major junctions
- East end: SR 244 in Lincolnia near Lake Barcroft
- I-495 in Annandale / Springfield SR 123 in Fairfax; VA 286 / Fairfax County Parkway in Fairfax SR 28 in Centreville
- West end: SR 705 in Stone Ridge

Location
- Country: United States
- State: Virginia

Highway system
- Virginia Routes; Interstate; US; Primary; Secondary; Byways; History; HOT lanes

State Route 620 in Fairfax and Loudoun Counties, Virginia is a secondary state highway. The entire length of SR 620 is also known as Braddock Road (except for a small section in Centreville called Spindle Court). SR 620 also has a short concurrency with SR 659 / Union Mill Road in Centreville.

In Centreville and Eastern Loudoun County, SR 620 is a major commuter route, as it empties onto SR 28 (Sully Rd.), which in turn has a nearby interchange with Interstate 66. SR 620 also has major junctions with SR 123, Fairfax County Parkway, and Interstate 495 (Capital Beltway). It has a very large number of residential neighborhoods lining the road, so most of the remainder is also a major commuter artery. The length and positioning of the highway attract motorists that are traveling from one part of Fairfax County to another.

== Route description ==
=== East and Central Fairfax County ===
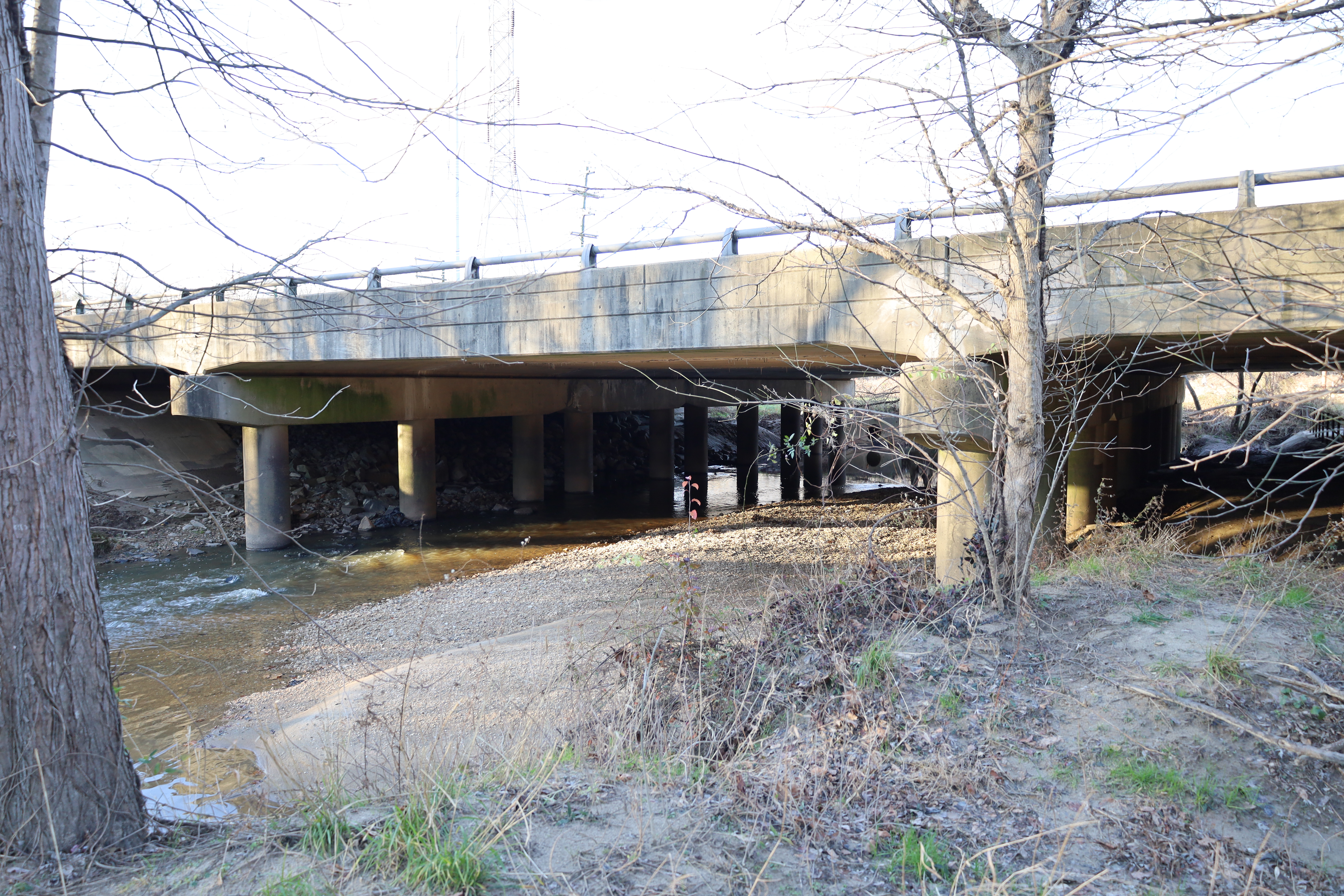
Accotink Creek crossing at the tripoint of Annandale, West Springfield, and North Springfield

SR 620 begins in Fairfax County at Columbia Pike (SR 244) near Lake Barcroft and runs southward, crossing the Little River Turnpike. It then intersects the Capital Beltway, Interstate 495. SR 620, heading westward at this point, then passes north of Burke and intersects SR 123 near George Mason University. It remains well south of Fairfax City and meets the freeway portion of Fairfax County Parkway. It then intersects SR 645 (Clifton Road) in Clifton, and next meets Union Mill Road. At this point, the road becomes New Braddock Road and SR 7783. New Braddock Road continues to SR 28.

=== In Centreville ===
While New Braddock Road continues straight, SR 620 itself is concurrent with SR 659 / Union Mill Road for one block. A new segment of Braddock Road (which shortly matches the old alignment of Braddock Road) starts here and heads west into Centreville. However, SR 620 quickly turns off onto a side-street, Spindle Court, and unceremoniously dead-ends behind Mountain View Alternative High School, creating another gap. The road that was SR 620 continues ahead as Old Braddock Road, SR 7759. Old Braddock Road continues ahead to Old Centreville Road (SR 898). That road connects to the beginning of the third segment of Braddock Road, which is located at a four-way intersection with US 29. This third segment was originally connected with what is now Spindle Court, but when a shopping center was built, a dead end on Braddock Road was created, and was renamed Spindle Ct. This segment only lasts for 0.32 mile, before turning into Pickwick Road (SR 1021).

=== Western Fairfax County ===
Braddock Road picks up again on the other side of I-66, at an intersection with SR 28. This fourth segment of SR 620 continues to the northwest, through several residential areas. It intersects with SR 609 (Pleasant Valley Road) and enters Loudoun County.

=== Loudoun County ===
Keeping the SR 620 designation, Braddock Road forms the southern border of South Riding where it intersects with and is the southern terminus of Loudoun County Parkway, SR 606. It then intersects with SR 659 (Gum Spring Road). It ends at the roundabout with SR 705 (Lightridge Farm Rd.) in Stone Ridge. Braddock Road, now designated SR 705, continues northwest to US 15 near Gilberts Corner.

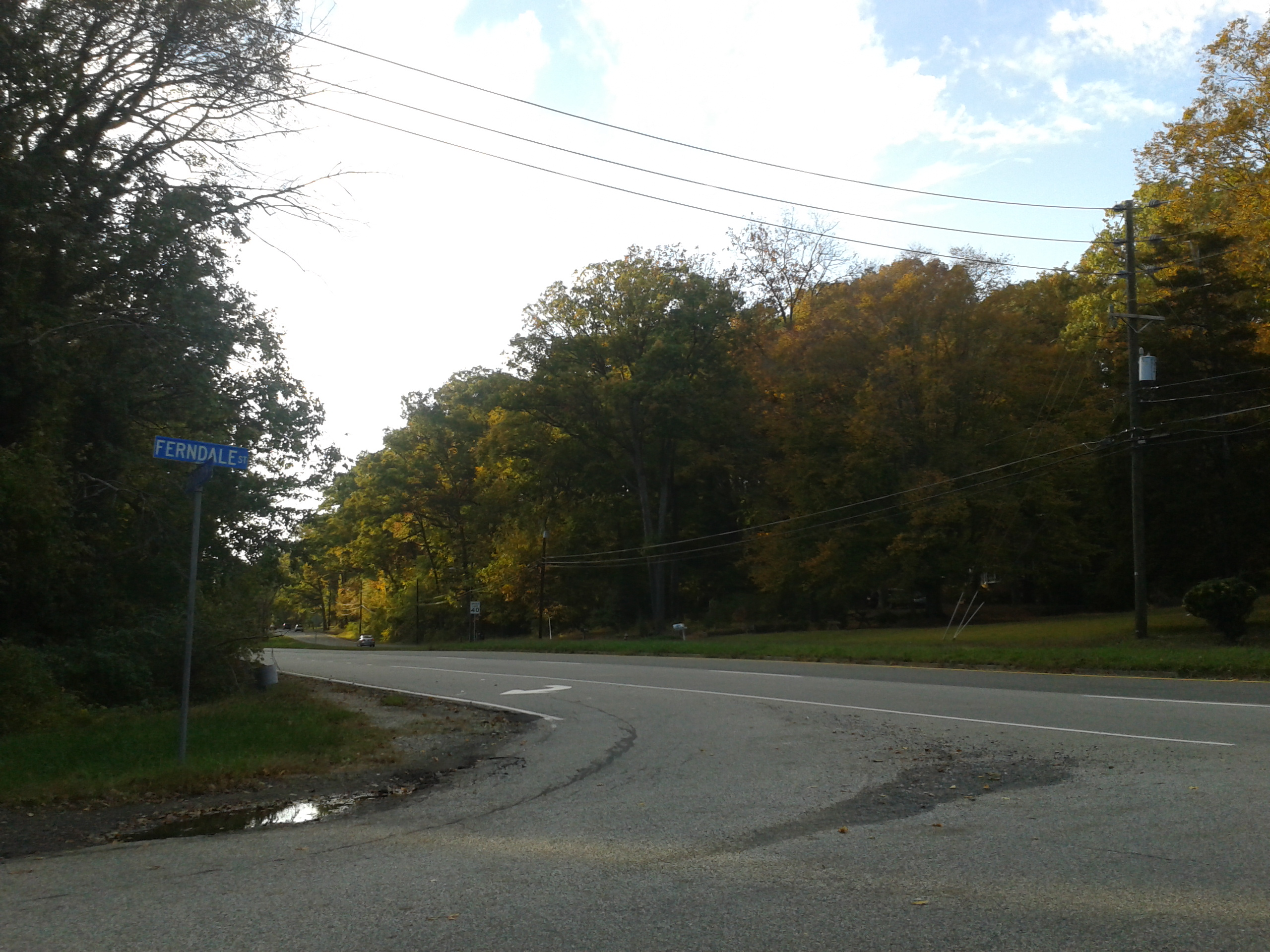
Braddock Road where it forms the border of North Springfield

Among the cities, towns and other landmarks traversed by SR 620 are:

- the Thomas Jefferson High School for Science and Technology lies near the intersection with Little River Turnpike
- Annandale
- an intersection with the Capital Beltway
- Burke
- George Mason University
- Centreville
- Sully Station
- South Riding

== Future construction ==
Many residents oppose the possible new construction of a shopping center at the southwestern corner of the intersection of SR 620 and SR 659 (Gum Springs Road), directly behind the Virginia Manor neighborhood, due to concerns of increased traffic. Loudoun County supervisors will vote on a proposal in September 2019 for a different shopping center, located at the southeastern corner of the intersection. This proposal would include a new intersection being constructed for an entrance off SR 620 to the shopping center.

Fairfax County is currently considering changes to SR 620 between Guinea Road and I-495. These include the improvement of pedestrian walkways and reconfiguration of certain intersections to decrease congestion in the area. The county's Department of Transportation has ruled out adding travel lanes to SR 620 or constructing a new park-and-ride and transit center due to the high costs.

== History ==
Historically, SR 620 was known as Braddock Road. The road has historical significance in the American Civil War, and portions of the road were established prior to British colonization of northern Virginia. Although the original Braddock Road was unified throughout its length, many portions of the original road have been transected, relocated or disjointed since the original path was defined (especially since the modern paved road system was constructed).

=== Establishment, including pre-colonization era ===
Braddock Road was originally composed of paths established by the Native American inhabitants of Northern Virginia. Later, British colonialists and Virginian governments developed and improved the paths into what became known as "Braddock's Road."

=== Colonial and revolutionary era ===
Price's Common, a market that operated during the colonial administration and was the site of the drafting of the Virginia Declaration of Rights signed by George Mason (and after which the Bill of Rights of the United States Constitution was modeled), was located by the intersection of Braddock Road and Backlick Road.

Braddock Rd is so named as it was believed to be the route of the English General Edward Braddock's force during the French and Indian War. At the outset of the Braddock Expedition, the force was split into two groups. Braddock led the first group across the Potomac near Rock Creek and up to Frederick and Sir Peter Halkett led a second group through Northern Virginia. Halkett's group marched past the Old Fairfax County courthouse (today Tysons Corner) and up to Coleman's Ordinary (today Northern Herndon, Virginia). It is unlikely that today's Braddock Road was the actual route taken by Halkett's group. Rather, they roughly followed the route of present-day Leesburg Pike (Route 7).

=== Civil War ===
During the American Civil War, both Union and Confederate troops traversed Braddock Road during various battles in Fairfax County and other parts of Northern Virginia.

One of Mosby's Raiders, Robert Spindle, was a native of Centreville. Later, the part of SR 620 that was formed when Braddock Road was cut at US 29 was named after him, Spindle Court.

=== Modern era ===
With the advent of the modern road system, Braddock Road changed. In the 1930s after the Virginia Secondary Road system was created Braddock Road in Fairfax and Loudoun Counties was given the designation SR 620.

In the 1960s I-66 was built coming through Centreville. At this point the section of SR 620 between SR28 south of I-66 and a point north of the new I-66 was deleted, and a new SR 620 entrance was created intersecting with SR 28 north of I-66.

When SR 28 was widened from a 4-lane highway to a 6-lane one SR 620 was changed again. SR 620 south of I-66 no longer intersected with SR 28; SR 620 ended where Willoughby Newton Drive is now.

In the 1980s a shopping center was built at the corner of U.S. 29 and Old Centreville Road. At that time the non-SR 620 section of Braddock Road was constructed linking SR 620 to Old Centreville Road. The intersection between SR 620 and U.S. 29 was cut, and this small portion of SR 620 was renamed Spindle Court.

The Loudoun County Board of Supervisors undertook an effort in 1989 to give the county's roads names that were determined to be more historically accurate. The plan proposed to rename the county's portion of Braddock Road to Colchester Road, but this single change was removed immediately before adoption.

In the 1990s New Braddock Road was constructed linking Union Mill Road to SR 28. This is when SR 620 was cut, so that, on the east side of Union Mill Road, the road is Braddock Road, and on the west side it is New Braddock Road. Braddock Road heading west now intersects with Union Mill Road one block to the north.

The final change came in 2009. A barrier was erected on SR 28 that forced all traffic coming from SR 620 from the west to turn south on SR 28.

Fairfax County considered changing the intersection between SR 123 and SR 620 to a full interchange. The designs considered are diamond, a modified diamond interchange, an SPUI, and a tight SPUI. Ultimately, one left turn lane in each direction of SR 123 was added at the intersection, the left turn lane on eastbound SR 620 was extended, and new traffic signals were installed.

== Major intersections ==
County	Location	mi	km	Destinations	Notes
Loudoun		0.00	0.00	SR 705 (Braddock Road / Lightridge Farm Road)	
Loudoun		2.23	3.59	SR 659 (Gum Spring Road)	
Loudoun	South Riding	3.59	5.78	SR 606 (Loudoun County Parkway) / SR 613 (Ticonderoga Road)	
Fairfax	Schneider Crossroads	5.95	9.58	SR 609 (Pleasant Valley Road)	
Fairfax	Centreville	8.65	13.92	SR 662 (Westfields Boulevard / Stone Road) to SR 28 north	
Fairfax	Centreville	10.10	16.25	SR 28 south (Sully Road)	No left turn eastbound
Fairfax	Centreville	Gap in route			
Fairfax	Centreville	10.10	16.25	Pickwick Road (SR 1021) / Willoughby Newton Drive	
Fairfax	Centreville	10.39	16.72	US 29 (Lee Highway) / SR 898 (Old Centreville Road)	
Fairfax	Centreville	Gap in route			
Fairfax	Centreville	10.39	16.72	Mountain View Alternative High School	
Fairfax	Centreville	10.54	16.96	Braddock Road (SR 7759)	
Fairfax	Centreville	11.48	18.48	SR 659 (Union Mill Road)	
Fairfax	Centreville	Gap in route			
Fairfax	Centreville	11.48	18.48	SR 659 (Union Mill Road) / SR 7783 (New Braddock Road)	
Fairfax	Centreville	11.99	19.30	SR 645 (Clifton Road) – Clifton	
Fairfax	Cobbs Corner	13.07	21.03	SR 612 (Colchester Road)	
Fairfax	Blevinstown	14.06	22.63	SR 286 (Fairfax County Parkway) to I-66	Interchange
Fairfax		16.95	27.28	SR 123 (Ox Road) – George Mason University	
Fairfax		20.70	33.31	SR 638 south (Rolling Road)	
Fairfax		21.01	33.81	SR 645 (Burke Lake Road) / SR 4693 (Woodland Way)	
Fairfax		22.78	36.66	I-495 / I-495 Express north – Tysons Corner, Richmond, Alexandria	I-495 exit 54
Fairfax		24.50	39.43	SR 617 (Backlick Road) – Annandale, Springfield	
Fairfax		26.19	42.15	SR 236 (Little River Turnpike)	
Fairfax		27.12	43.65	SR 613 (Lincolnia Road)	
Fairfax		27.71	44.59	SR 244 (Columbia Pike)	
1.000 mi = 1.609 km; 1.000 km = 0.621 mi
