= Virginia State Route 662 (Fairfax County) =

State highway in Virginia, United States

State Route 662

Route information
- Maintained by VDOT
- Length: 3.5 mi (5.6 km) Stone Road: 1.5 mi. Poplar Tree Road: 0.9 mi. Westfields Blvd: 1.1 mi.

Major junctions
- South end: US 29 (Lee Highway) in Centreville
- SR 620 (Braddock Road) in Centreville; SR 28 (Sully Road) in Centreville / Chantilly
- North end: SR 657 (Walney Road) in Chantilly

Location
- Country: United States
- State: Virginia

Highway system
- Virginia Routes; Interstate; US; Primary; Secondary; Byways; History; HOT lanes

State Route 662 is a secondary state highway in the U.S. state of Virginia that traverses western Fairfax County.

== Route description ==
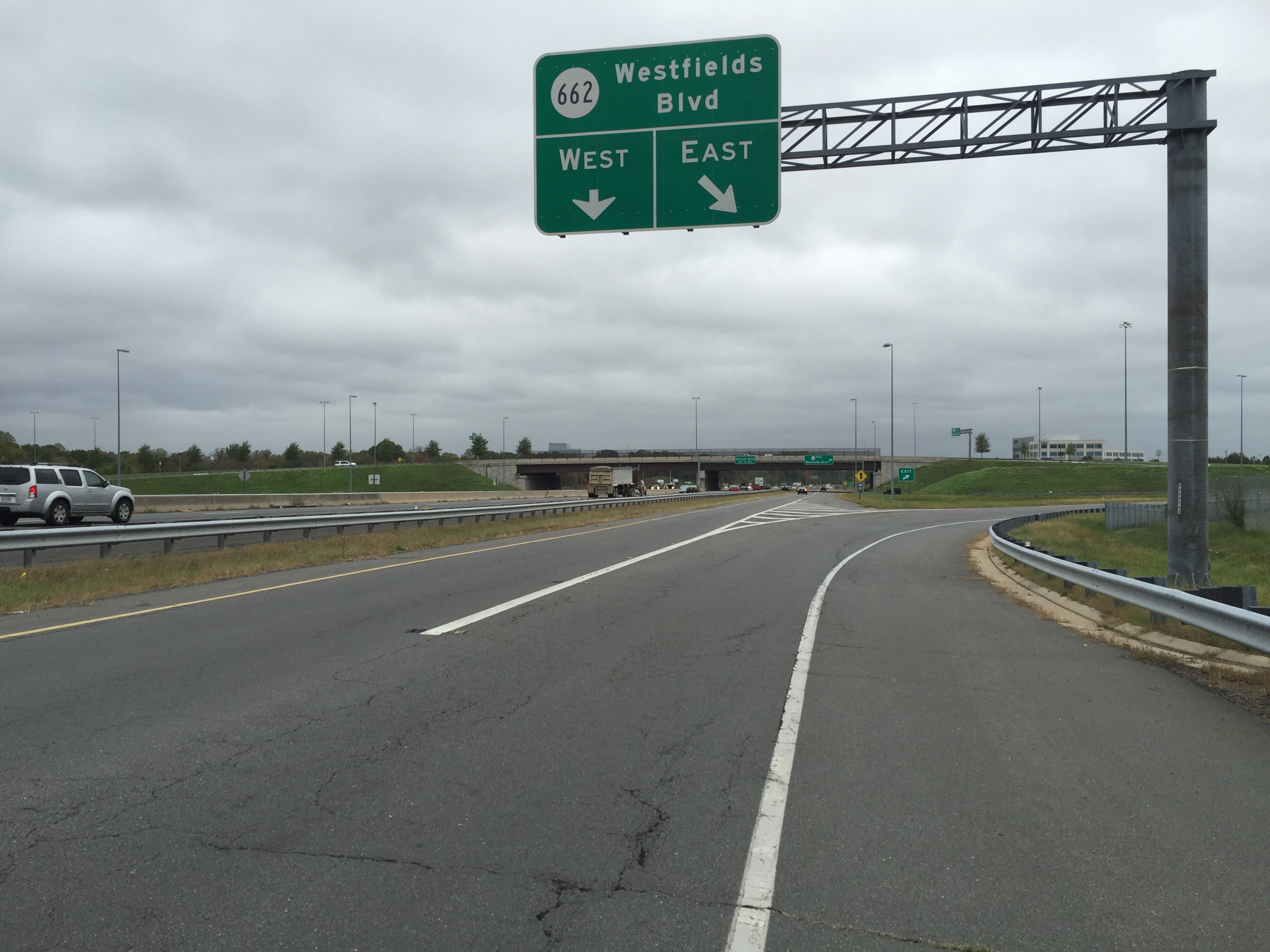
Exit for SR 662 along southbound SR 28

SR 662 uses three different names: Stone Road, Poplar Tree Road, and Westfields Boulevard.

=== Stone Road ===
The southern terminus of SR 662 is just south of an intersection with US 29 (Lee Highway), just west of Interstate 66. Stone Road is a four-lane highway, mostly divided by a relatively narrow median.

Stone Road passes through the "London Towne" section of Centreville and a shopping center as it approaches Braddock Road.

=== Poplar Tree Road ===
North of Braddock Road, SR 662 becomes Poplar Tree Road. This road curves around housing developments to the front of the Sully Station shopping center, where the name changes to Westfields Boulevard. Poplar Tree Road had been a two-lane undivided road but in spring 2013 a reconstruction and widening project was completed, and it is now a four-lane divided road.

=== Westfields Boulevard ===
SR 662 continues past the Sully Station shopping center and through an interchange with SR 28 (Sully Road), then past office parks before ending at SR 657 (Walney Road). Approaching this T intersection northbound on SR 662, traffic for southbound SR 657 turns right while northbound SR 657 continues straight. Westfields Boulevard is a four to six lane divided highway.

== History ==
Prior to 1990, SR 662 followed Poplar Tree Road across VA 28 and the southern section of Chantilly. The completion of the widening of Route 28 (plus the construction of the north end of Sully Station shopping center) made Poplar Tree Road discontinuous, separating its Centreville and Chantilly sections. Westfields Boulevard was built in the late 1980s, but the SR 662 designation was not officially moved onto it until nearly twenty years later. The Chantilly segment of Poplar Tree Road was renumbered in the late 2000s.

== Major intersections ==
The entire route is in Fairfax County.

Location	mi	km	Destinations	Notes
Centreville	0.0	0.0	US 29 (Lee Highway)	South terminus of SR 662; signalized intersection
Centreville	1.5	2.4	SR 620 (Braddock Road)	Signalized intersection
Centreville	2.6	4.2	SR 8460 (Stonecroft Boulevard)	Signalized intersection
	2.7	4.3	SR 28 (Sully Road) – Dulles Airport, Centreville	Interchange; southbound exit also marked To I-66
Chantilly	3.5	5.6	SR 657 (Walney Road)	North terminus of SR 662; signalized intersection
1.000 mi = 1.609 km; 1.000 km = 0.621 mi
