= Virginia State Route 606 (Fairfax and Loudoun Counties) =

State highway in Virginia, United States

State Route 606
- SR 606 highlighted in red

Route information
- Maintained by VDOT
- Length: 16.68 mi (26.84 km)

Major junctions
- West end: SR 620 / SR 613 in South Riding
- US 50 in South Riding; SR 267 Toll in Sterling; SR 28 in Sterling; SR 228 in Herndon; SR 286 at the Herndon–Reston city line
- East end: SR 7 in Reston

Location
- Country: United States
- State: Virginia

Highway system
- Virginia Routes; Interstate; US; Primary; Secondary; Byways; History; HOT lanes

State Route 606 in Fairfax and Loudoun Counties, Virginia is a secondary state highway traversing the communities of Reston, Herndon, Sterling, Arcola, and South Riding. The road is important not only because it is an inter-county connector, but it goes around the back of Dulles Airport, is part of the Loudoun County Parkway, and it provides a shortcut between the Reston / Herndon area and U.S. Route 50. Although the Herndon streets are not technically part of SR 606, they are signed as SR 606, and they connect to streets that are part of SR 606, thus providing a continuous route.

== Route description ==
SR 606 goes by five names: Baron Cameron Avenue in Fairfax County, Elden Street in Herndon as SR 235-6656, Sterling Road in Herndon as SR 235-6656, Old Ox Road in Loudoun County, and the Loudoun County Parkway to its terminus at SR 620 (Braddock Rd.).

=== Reston ===
In Reston, SR 606 is called Baron Cameron Avenue. Baron Cameron Avenue starts at an intersection with SR 7, Leesburg Pike. For a short distance (0.18 mi.) SR 606 is concurrent with SR 674. Baron Cameron Avenue then travels westward through the northern part of Reston to the Herndon border.

=== Herndon ===
The Town of Herndon is responsible for the maintenance of its streets, although the Virginia Department of Transportation (VDOT) helps towns and cities financially, and has designated these roads with state route numbers.

Although SR 606 technically ends at the Herndon border, roads within Herndon are signed as SR 606, and they provide a direct connector to SR 606 in Loudoun County, so they are included here. When SR 606 enters the town the route changes to Elden Street, the main commercial road of Herndon. When Elden Street intersects with SR 228, Elden Street becomes SR 228. (signed) SR 606 is concurrent with SR 228 / Elden Street to Sterling Road, where the route continues west toward Loudoun County.

=== Loudoun County ===
In Loudoun County SR 606 continues the path of Sterling Road as a four lane divided highway called Old Ox Road. It heads west until it crosses over SR 28, Sully Road at an interchange. It continues toward the Dulles Greenway (SR 267) as it passes some warehouses on the south side. The intersection with the Dulles Greenway is the planned location for the Route 606 station of the proposed Phase 2 of the Silver Line of the Washington Metro.

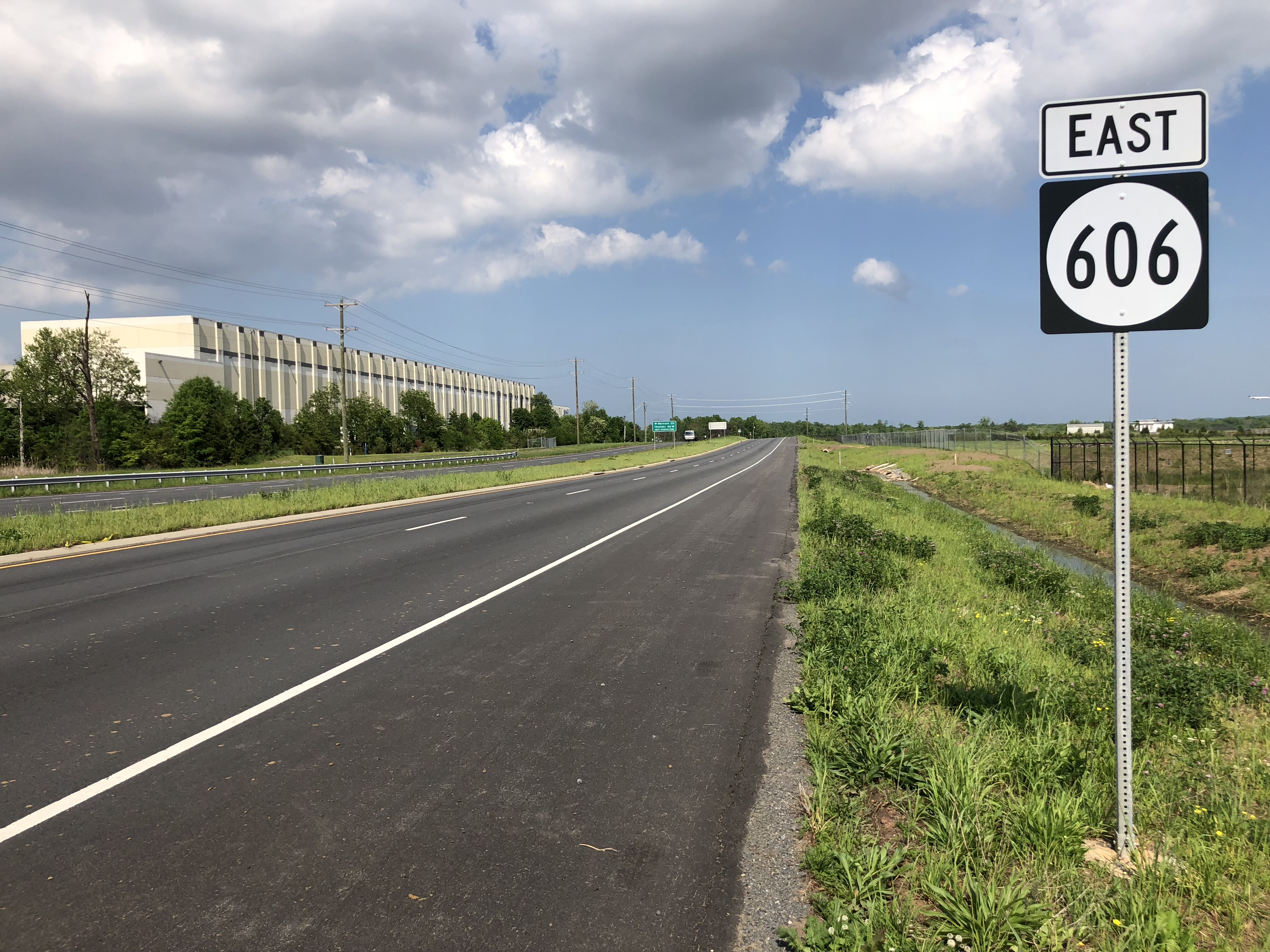
View east along SR 606 in Dulles

After the interchange with the Dulles Greenway, SR 606 turns to the southwest and goes around the back of Dulles Airport. It passes some single-family houses to the west, and Dulles Airport and some low rise office buildings to the east.

There is a now a four-way intersection with Old Ox Road and Arcola Boulevard. Drivers use the triple left turn lanes to turn left onto what is now known as Loudoun County Parkway. The road expands into three through lanes westbound and two through lanes eastbound. It continues as such until the intersection with US 50, where it changes back into two through lanes westbound and two through lanes eastbound. It then passes through a portion of South Riding, and terminates at the intersection of SR 620 (Braddock Road) and SR 613 (Ticonderoga Road), just south of South Riding.

== History ==
=== Herndon ===
VDOT has plans to widen Elden St. between Van Buren Street and the Fairfax County Parkway (SR 286). However, due to budget cutbacks, this project has been put on hold.

=== Loudoun County ===
Before construction on the Loudoun County Parkway started, SR 606 ended at the intersection with US 50. As of March 2010, SR 606 has been extended from US 50 to SR 620 (Braddock Road). The portion between SR 620 (Braddock Road) and SR 7 (Harry Byrd Hwy) has been designated part of the Loudoun County Parkway, and is a five-lane divided highway. (See the article SR 607; Loudoun County Parkway)

== Major intersections ==
County	Location	mi	km	Destinations	Notes
Loudoun	South Riding	0.00	0.00	SR 613 south (Ticonderoga Road) / SR 620 (Braddock Road)	Southern terminus
Loudoun	South Riding	2.11	3.40	US 50 (John Mosby Highway)	Former end of Old Ox Road and SR 606
Loudoun	Arcola	2.92	4.70	SR 621 (Evergreen Mills Road)	
Loudoun	Arcola	3.69	5.94	SR 607 north (Loudoun County Parkway) – Ashburn	Southern terminus of SR 607; future intersection with SR 842 (Arcola Boulevard)
Loudoun	Sterling	7.93	12.76	SR 267 Toll (Dulles Greenway) – Leesburg, Washington	Tolled ramps to SR 267 west and from SR 267 east; exits 8A-B on SR 267
Loudoun	Sterling	10.05	16.17	SR 28 to SR 7 – Dulles Airport	Interchange
Loudoun	Sterling	11.14	17.93	SR 605 (Rock Hill Road)	
Fairfax	Herndon	12.10	19.47	Elden Street (SR 228 south)	Western terminus of unsigned SR 228 concurrency
Fairfax	Herndon	12.73	20.49	Monroe Street (SR 228 north)	Eastern terminus of unsigned SR 228 concurrency
Fairfax	Herndon–Reston city line	13.75	22.13	SR 286 (Fairfax County Parkway)	SPUI
Fairfax	Reston	14.40	23.17	SR 602 (Reston Parkway)	
Fairfax	Reston	15.59	25.09	SR 828 (Wiehle Avenue)	
Fairfax	Reston	16.50	26.55	Hunter Mill Road (SR 674 south)	
Fairfax	Reston	16.68	26.84	SR 7 (Leesburg Pike) / SR 674 north (Springvale Road)	
1.000 mi = 1.609 km; 1.000 km = 0.621 mi: Concurrency terminus; Tolled
