= Virginia State Route 228 =

State highway in Fairfax County, Virginia, US

State Route 228

Route information
- Maintained by VDOT
- Length: 4.53 mi (7.29 km)
- Existed: 1966–present

Major junctions
- South end: SR 657 (Centreville Road) in Herndon
- North end: SR 7 (Leesburg Pike) near Dranesville

Location
- Country: United States
- State: Virginia
- Counties: Fairfax

Highway system
- Virginia Routes; Interstate; US; Primary; Secondary; Byways; History; HOT lanes
← SR 227	→ SR 229

State Route 228 (SR 228) is a primary state highway in the U.S. state of Virginia. The state highway runs 4.53 miles (7.29 km) from SR 657 at the southern town limit of Herndon north to SR 7 near Dranesville. SR 228 is the main north–south highway through Herndon, connecting the town directly with SR 7 and indirectly with SR 267 in northwestern Fairfax County.

== Route description ==
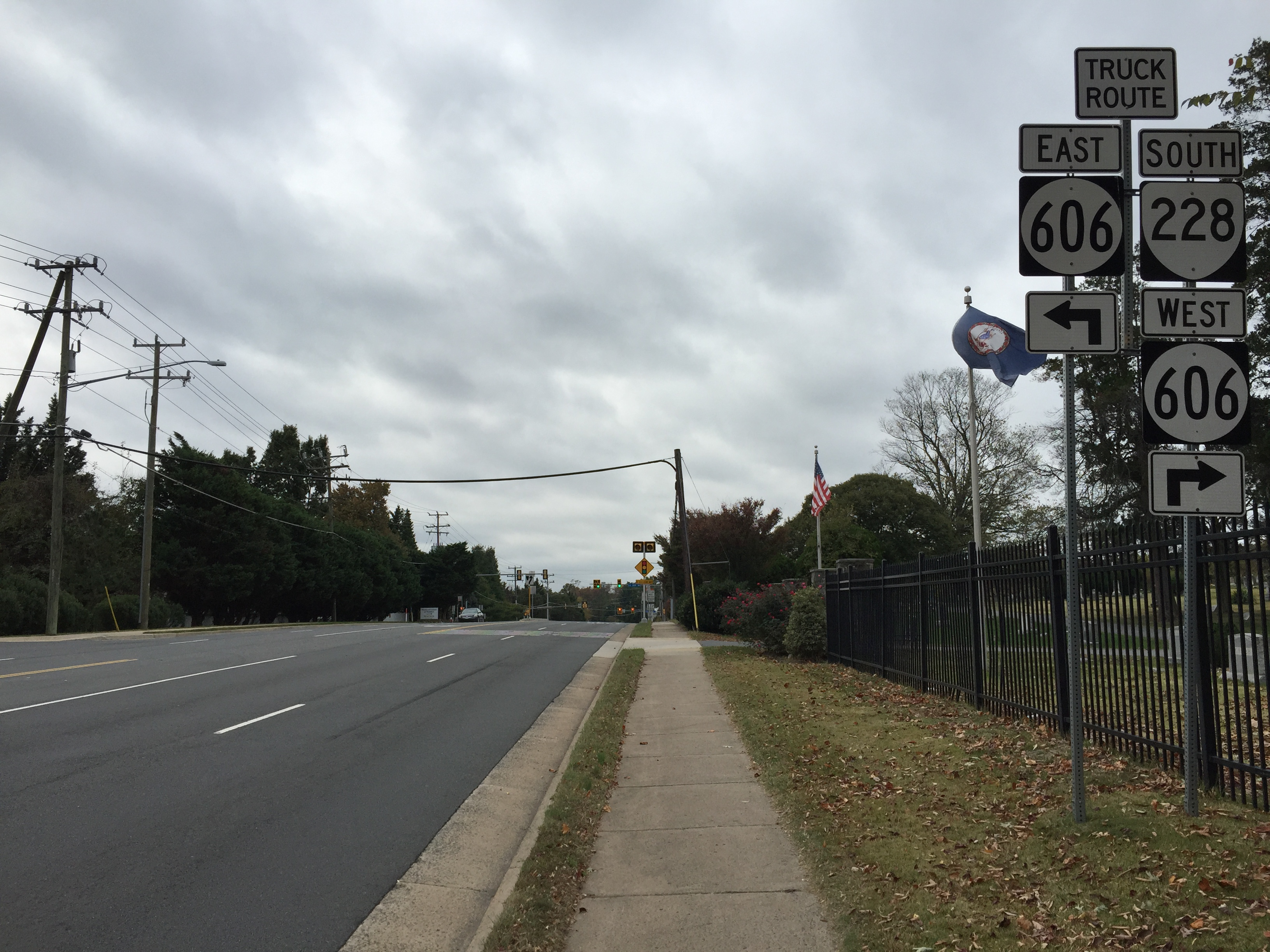
View south along SR 228 just north of Herndon Parkway in Herndon

SR 228 begins at the southern town limit of Herndon between Parcher Avenue and Herndon Parkway. The roadway continues south into Oak Hill as SR 657 (Centreville Road), which has a diamond interchange with SR 267 (Dulles Toll Road) south of Parcher Avenue. SR 228 heads northeast as Elden Street, which begins as a six-lane divided highway in a commercial area. North of Herndon Parkway, which is a circumferential boulevard within the town of Herndon, the highway becomes a five-lane road with a center left-turn lane. SR 228 intersects SR 606 (Sterling Road) and curves east, reducing to a two-lane undivided road and passing through a residential area on its way to downtown Herndon. In the center of town, the state highway intersects the Washington & Old Dominion Railroad Trail next to the Herndon Depot Museum. One block east of the rail trail, SR 228 turns north onto Monroe Street; Elden Street continues east as SR 606. The state highway veers northeast onto Park Avenue, then north again onto Dranesville Road, where the highway becomes four lanes. SR 228 intersects the northern leg of Herndon Parkway and becomes a divided highway at the northern town limit next to Herndon High School. The state highway passes several residential subdivisions before reaching its northern terminus at SR 7 (Leesburg Pike) west of Dranesville and just east of the Fairfax–Loudoun county line.

== Major intersections ==
The entire route is in Fairfax County.

Location	mi	km	Destinations	Notes
Herndon	0.00	0.00	SR 657 (Elden Street) to SR 267 Toll – Chantilly	Southern town limit of Herndon; southern terminus
Herndon	0.24	0.39	SR 228 Truck north (Herndon Parkway)	Truck route for SR 606
Herndon	0.66	1.06	SR 606 west (Sterling Road)	Southern end of concurrency with SR 606
Herndon	1.30	2.09	SR 606 east (Elden Street)	Northern end of concurrency with SR 606
Herndon	2.30	3.70	SR 228 Truck south (Herndon Parkway)	Truck route for SR 606
Dranesville	3.95	6.36	SR 604 west (Sugarland Road)	Eastern terminus of western portion of SR 604
Dranesville	4.53	7.29	SR 7 (Leesburg Pike) – Leesburg, Tysons Corner	Northern terminus
1.000 mi = 1.609 km; 1.000 km = 0.621 mi: Concurrency terminus

State Route 228 Truck
- Location: Herndon
- Length: 2.70 mi (4.35 km)

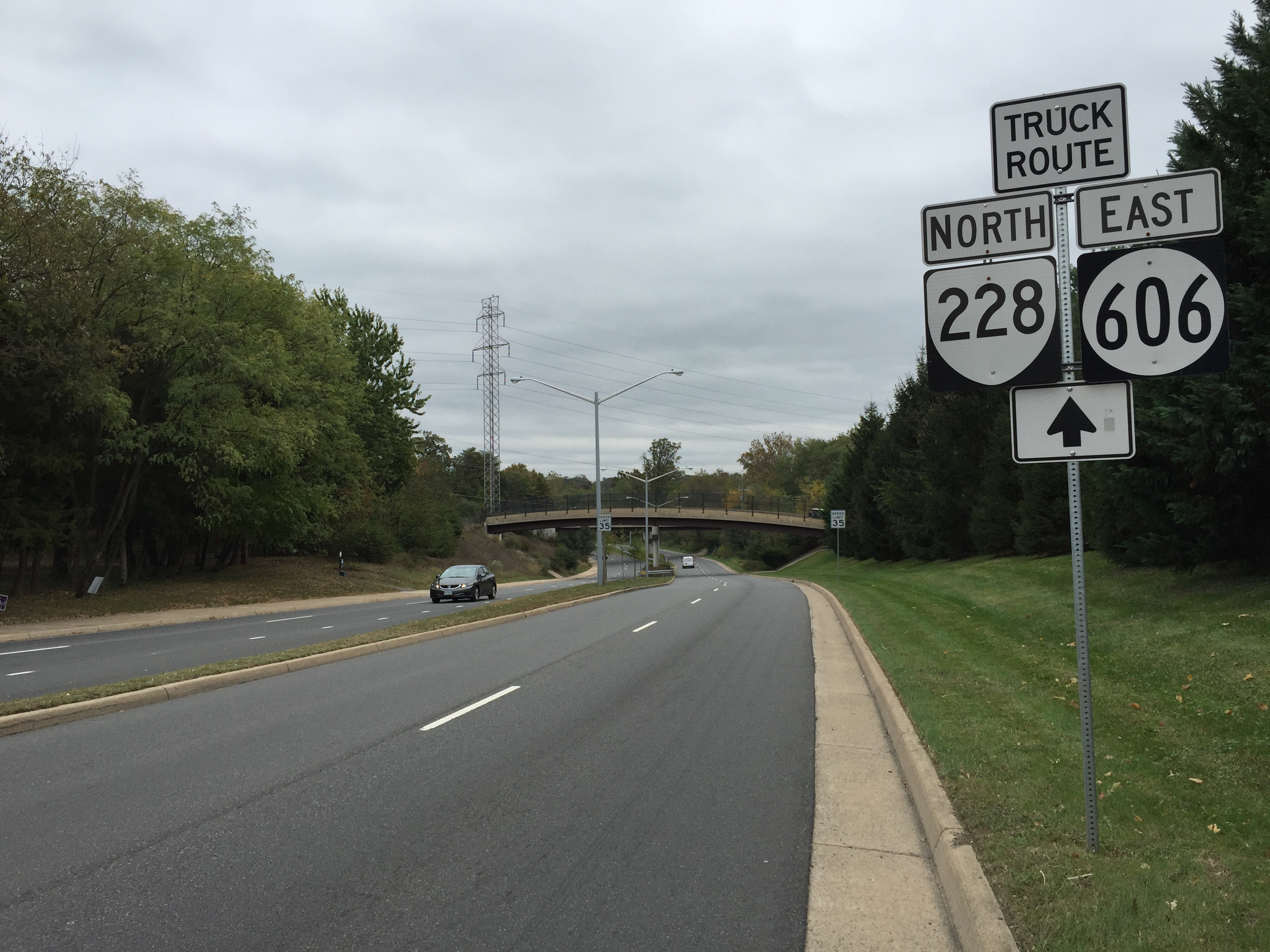
Herndon Parkway carries SR 228 Truck and SR 606 Truck around downtown Herndon

== Herndon truck route ==
SR 228 Truck is a truck route of SR 228 in the town of Herndon. The truck route runs 2.70 miles (4.35 km) between intersections with SR 228 on either side of town. SR 228 Truck is concurrent with Herndon Parkway for its entire length, and the route runs along the west side of downtown Herndon.
