= Virginia State Route 28 =

State highway in Virginia, United States

State Route 28

Route information
- Maintained by VDOT
- Length: 49 mi (79 km)
- Existed: 1918–present

Major junctions
- South end: US 15 / US 29 / SR 657 near Remington
- US 17 near Bealeton; SR 234 in Manassas; US 29 in Centreville; I-66 in Centreville; US 50 in Chantilly; SR 267 Toll near Sterling
- North end: SR 7 near Sterling

Location
- Country: United States
- State: Virginia
- Counties: Fauquier, Prince William, City of Manassas, City of Manassas Park, Fairfax, Loudoun

Highway system
- Virginia Routes; Interstate; US; Primary; Secondary; Byways; History; HOT lanes
← SR 27	→ US 29

State Route 28 (SR 28) is a primary state highway in the U.S. state of Virginia that traverses the counties of Loudoun, Fairfax, Prince William, and Fauquier. The route is a major artery in the Northern Virginia region, serving as an important two-lane highway in rural Fauquier and Prince William Counties, the main thoroughfare through Manassas and Manassas Park, and a high-capacity freeway through Fairfax and Loudoun counties.

== Route description ==
From SR 28's southern terminus to Nokesville, it is a two-lane rural highway, called Catlett Road through Fauquier County and Nokesville Road in Prince William County where it becomes a four-lane divided highway up to Manassas. Through downtown Manassas, the route follows one-way streets, with VA 28 westbound following Church Street and eastbound following Center Street and Zebedee Street. From thereon to Centreville in Fairfax County, the road is called Centreville Road. Between Fairfax and Loudoun Counties up to its northern terminus, VA 28 is a six-lane freeway called Sully Road.

=== Fauquier County ===
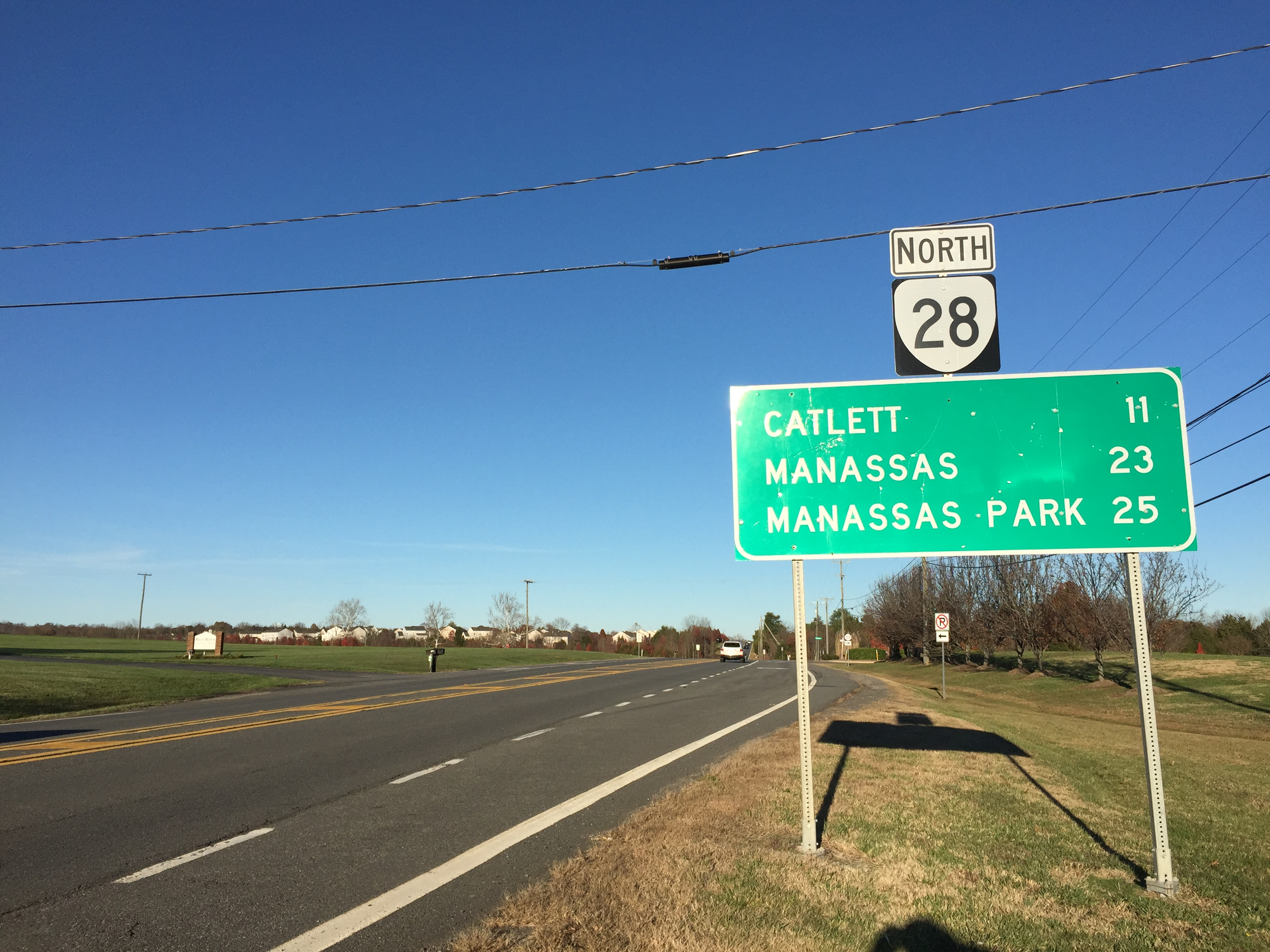
SR 28 northbound in Bealeton

Route 28 starts as Catlett Road at busy US 29/US 15 in Fauquier County just north of Culpeper County, and intersects US 17 about 3 miles (4.8 km) from its beginning. It is two lanes throughout rural Fauquier County with a speed limit of 45 miles per hour (72 km/h) and passes by farms and agricultural areas. Most of the way through Fauquier County Route 28 runs parallel to Norfolk Southern railroad tracks in order to serve the towns that are placed along them. Several historical markers can be seen along Route 28 as it passes through Fauquier including Supreme Court Justice John Marshall's birthplace and the raid on Catlett Station. For many years the old bridge for Route 28 could be seen just outside Catlett. Historically, the Catlett Fire Department Parade would close Route 28 for several hours each spring, however, this practice was discontinued as traffic became heavier in the 1990s.

=== Prince William County ===
Upon entering Prince William County at Nokesville, SR 28 changes its name to Nokesville Road. At Nokesville, it expands from two to four lanes before reaching SR 215 at Fitzwater Drive (SR 652). Further north, it reaches its first grade-separated interchange at SR 234/Prince William Parkway, south of the City of Manassas.

The next interchange is at Wellington Road in Manassas, mostly to grade-separate the crossing of SR 28 with nearby railroad tracks. This interchange was built as an $18.3 million project and certified under the American Recovery and Reinvestment Act of 2009 on October 5, 2009. The contract for construction of this interchange was awarded on July 14, 2010.

SR 28 is a main thoroughfare through Manassas, and separates into a one-way pair of Church and Center Streets in front of a Confederate cemetery. The split routes run through the center of the city and rejoin several blocks later, merging into Centreville Road. The road passes briefly through Manassas Park and then passes through Yorkshire as SR 28 leaves Prince William County where crossing Bull Run into Centreville, Fairfax County.

=== Fairfax County ===
VA 28/Centreville Road enters Fairfax County at Centreville, at which point it transitions from an undivided to a divided highway. It starts as a suburban arterial with only at-grade intersections, widening to six lanes at an intersection with Machen Road on the south side of Centreville. In the middle of Centreville, VA 28 transitions into Sully Road and becomes a fully controlled-access freeway, where it crosses U.S. Route 29 at a partial cloverleaf interchange and Interstate 66 at a system interchange with flyovers. Up until 2020, the section of VA 28 between Centreville and Chantilly had signalized intersections at I 66, Braddock Road (SR 620), and Ellanor C. Lawrence Park and was only built to expressway standards. The intersections of since been replaced by overpasses and flyovers as part of the Transform 66 project, which included several improvements to the I 66 corridor through the late 2010s and early 2020s.

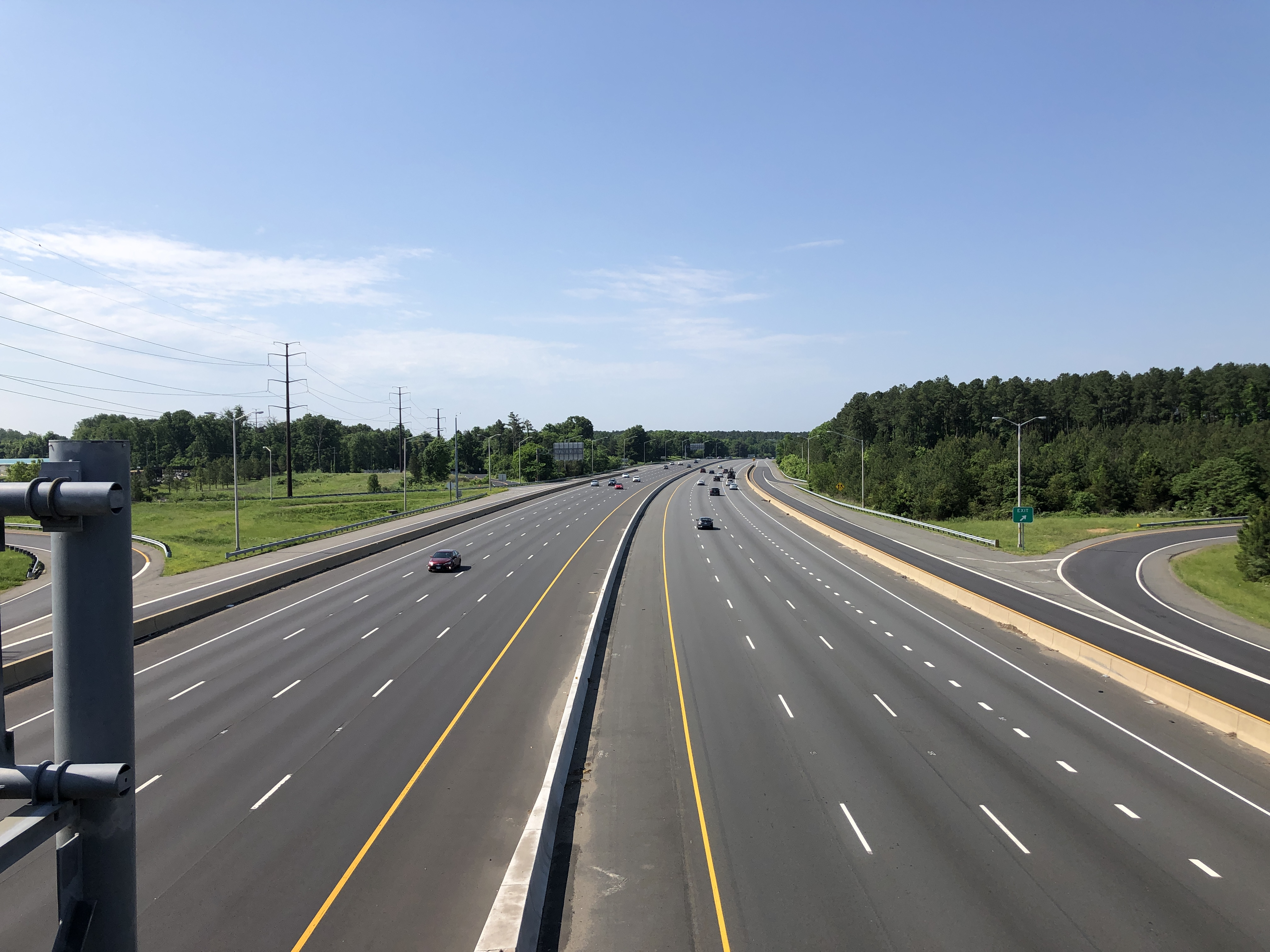
View south along SR 28 from Air and Space Museum Parkway on the border of Oak Hill and Chantilly

After a cloverleaf interchange with Westfields Boulevard (SR 662), Route 28 enters Chantilly. The highway travels through a single-point urban interchange with Willard Road and continues through Chantilly. Route 28 then enters Oak Hill and heads north along the eastern edge of the Washington Dulles International Airport. The next interchanges are for US 50 in Chantilly, the Steven F. Udvar-Hazy Center (an annex of the National Air and Space Museum), McLearen Road, and Frying Pan Road on the south end of Herndon. The road then exits into Loudoun County.

=== Loudoun County ===
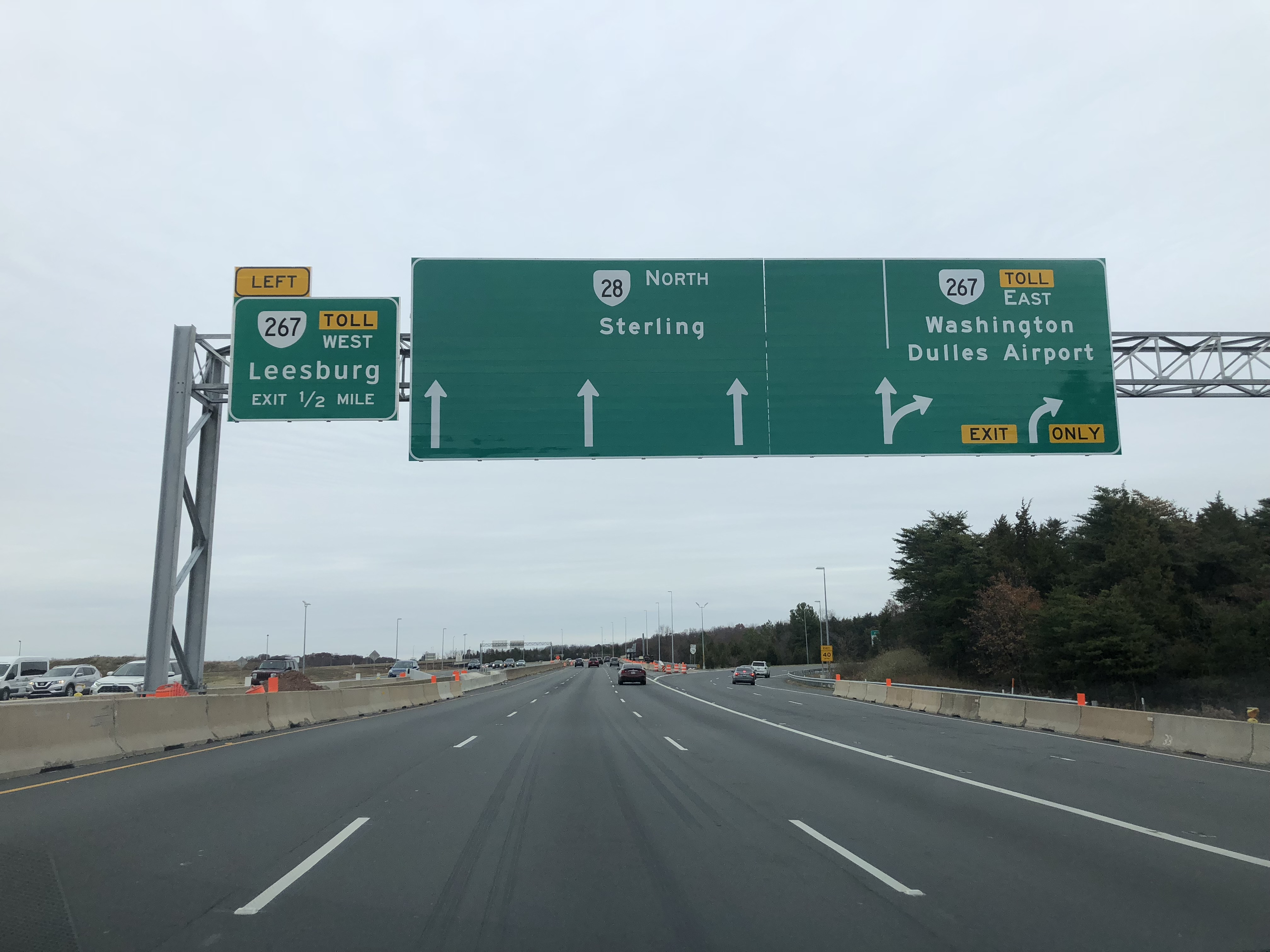
SR 28 northbound at SR 267 exit in Dulles

The first interchange in Loudoun County is at the entrance to Dulles Airport, with access to the airport itself, to the Dulles Toll/Access Road (State Route 267) and Dulles Greenway, and to Innovation Avenue (State Route 209). Continuing north through Loudoun County, Route 28 has interchanges with Old Ox Road and Sterling Boulevard, the former also servicing Herndon. The next interchange is an elaborate interchange with Route 625, Waxpool Road and Church Road, which lead into Ashburn and Sterling, respectively. This interchange features two exits for Waxpool Road from the northbound lanes of Route 28: a left flyover and right loop ramp.

Heading north, Route 28 passes through the industrial and commercial areas of Dulles. It is still known as Sully Road through this stretch, although within Loudoun County it is co-designated as Darrell Green Boulevard, after the former Washington Commanders Hall of Famer (the team's official headquarters is in Ashburn), whose uniform number was 28. A northbound-only, exit-only ramp at Warp Drive is followed by a partial cloverleaf serving Gloucester Parkway and Nokes Boulevard. This interchange leads to both Ashburn and the Dulles Town Center shopping mall. Route 28 ends at VA 7 in Sterling in a complete directional T interchange.

== History ==
SR 28 is one of two routes to survive from the 1918 inception of Virginia's state route system without being completely decommissioned or renumbered, the other being SR 10. However, due to extensions, truncations, and partial renumberings, the current SR 28 contains no portion of the earliest routing, which ran near present-day U.S. 29 from Lovingston in Nelson County to Charlottesville.

=== Improvement project ===
In 1987, Virginia authorized the creation of special tax districts. Fairfax and Loudoun Counties quickly formed the first transportation improvement district in the Commonwealth, by imposing a 20 cent per $100 real estate surcharge on commercial and industrial property located near Route 28. The surcharge financed bonds to pay for improvements to Route 28. From 1988 to 1991, 14 miles (23 km) of Route 28 were widened from two lanes to six lanes and interchanges were built at US 50, VA 7 and VA 267.

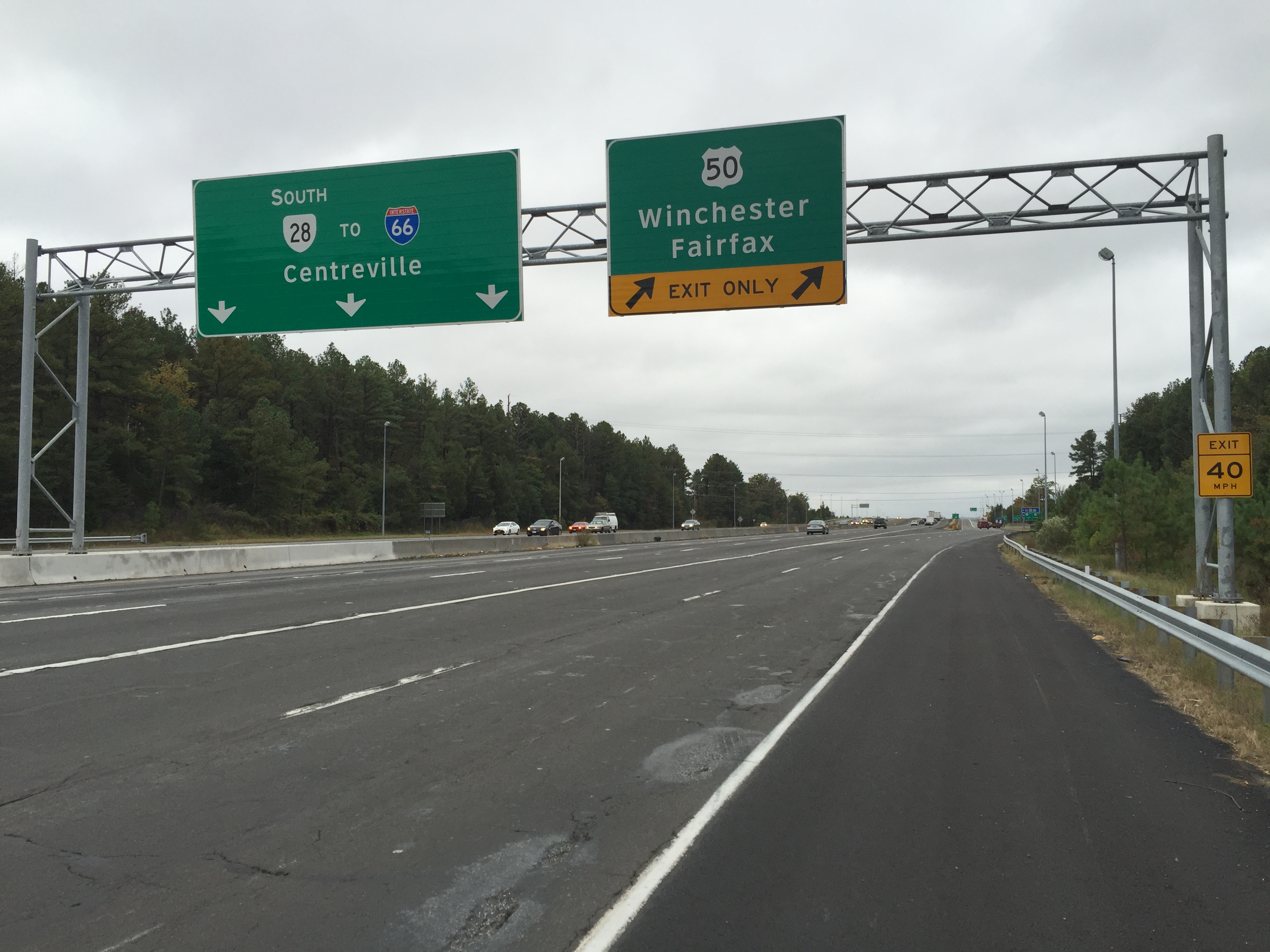
SR 28 southbound at the US 50 interchange in Chantilly

The completion schedule for each funded interchange and roadway is as follows:

- Air & Space Museum Parkway Interchange – Completed Summer 2004
- SR 625 Interchange – Completed

- SR 625 Interchange (Waxpool/Church Roads), Flyover Bridge & Waxpool Road widening – Completed Fall 2005
- Church Road Widening and W&OD Trail Bridge – Completed Fall 2006

- SR 606 Interchange (Old Ox Road) – Completed Spring 2005
- SR 662 Interchange (Westfields Boulevard) – Completed Fall 2005
- SR 668 Interchange (McLearen Road) – Completed Spring 2006
- SR 846 Interchange (Sterling Boulevard) – Completed Spring 2007
- SR 607 (Loudoun County Parkway) – Completed Summer 2006
- SR 657 (Centreville Road) – Completed Fall 2007
- Pacific Boulevard (between Sterling Blvd. and Cedar Green Rd.) – Completed Spring 2007
- Willard Road Interchange – Completed Summer 2009
- SR 608 Interchange (Frying Pan Road) – Completed Spring 2010
- SR 209 (Innovation Avenue) – right-in, right-out – Completed Fall 2007
- SR 1793 Interchange (Nokes Boulevard/Dulles Town Center) – Completed Summer 2009
- Warp Drive (formerly Steeplechase Drive), converted from at-grade intersection to northbound exit ramp only – completed fall 2011
- Pacific Boulevard (between Severn Way and Nokes Blvd.) – Fall 2009
- Braddock/Walney Roads Intersection – Completed Spring 2007
- SR 209, full interchange – Construction began Fall 2011, completed early 2017.
- Atlantic Boulevard (extension to Church Road) – Construction began Spring 2010, completed December 2011.
- Interstate 66/Braddock Road/Walney Road interchange reconstruction and Poplar Tree Road overpass – construction began April 2018, Completed November 2022

VA 28 was widened to four lanes southbound between Waxpool Road and Innovation Avenue in January 2017, and northbound between McLearen Road and VA 267 in June 2017. For a decade there have also been proposals to extend Route 28 to north to connect it with Interstate 370 in Gaithersburg, Maryland over a Techway Bridge across the Potomac River. The Loudoun County Board of Supervisors most recently endorsed the bridge at a summer 2017 transportation summit, although Montgomery County, Maryland remains adamantly opposed to the project.

== Major intersections ==
All exits are unnumbered.

County	Location	mi	km	Destinations	Notes
Fauquier	Remington	0.00	0.00	US 15 / US 29 (James Madison Highway) / SR 657 (Kings Hill Road) – Culpeper, Warrenton	Southern terminus
Fauquier	Bealeton	2.30	3.70	US 17 (Marsh Road) – Warrenton, Fredericksburg	
Prince William	Bristow	18.84	30.32	SR 215 west (Vint Hill Road)	
Prince William	Bristow	18.96	30.51	SR 619 (Linton Hall Road) – Gainesville, Bristow, Independent Hill	
City of Manassas		20.36	32.77	SR 234 to I-66 – Dumfries	Partial cloverleaf interchange with flyover ramps
City of Manassas		23.23	37.39	SR 234 Bus. (Grant Avenue)	
City of Manassas Park		24.89	40.06	SR 213 (Manassas Drive)	
Fairfax	Centreville	29.65	47.72	South end of freeway section	
Fairfax	Centreville	29.65	47.72	US 29 to I-66 west – Fairfax, Gainesville, Front Royal	Partial cloverleaf interchange
Fairfax	Centreville	30.19	48.59	I-66 – Front Royal, Washington	I-66 exit 53; no direct access from SR 28 north to I-66 west or I-66 east to SR 28 south
Fairfax	Centreville	30.50	49.08	Braddock Road/Walney Road	Northbound exit and southbound entrance
Fairfax	Chantilly	32.26	51.92	SR 662 (Westfields Boulevard)	
Fairfax	Chantilly	33.26	53.53	Willard Road (SR 6215/SR 8407)	Single-point urban interchange
Fairfax	Chantilly	34.14	54.94	US 50 (Lee Jackson Memorial Highway) – Fairfax, Winchester	Cloverleaf interchange
Fairfax	Chantilly	35.47	57.08	SR 7833 (Air and Space Museum Parkway) – Sully Historic Site, Steven F. Udvar-Hazy Center	Cloverleaf interchange
Fairfax	Herndon	36.53	58.79	SR 668 (McLearen Road)	Trumpet interchange
Fairfax	Herndon	37.75	60.75	SR 608 (Frying Pan Road)	Trumpet interchange
Loudoun	Sterling	38.98	62.73	SR 267 Toll east / Dulles Toll Road – Washington	SR 267 exit 9
Loudoun	Sterling	38.98	62.73	– Washington Dulles International Airport	
Loudoun	Sterling	38.98	62.73	SR 267 Toll west – Leesburg	SR 267 exit 9A; northbound left exit and southbound entrance
Loudoun	Sterling	39.48	63.54	SR 209 (Innovation Avenue)	Trumpet interchange
Loudoun	Sterling	39.98	64.34	SR 606 (Old Ox Road) to US 50 west – Herndon	Cloverleaf interchange
Loudoun	Sterling	40.60	65.34	SR 846 (Sterling Boulevard)	Partial cloverleaf interchange
Loudoun	Sterling	41.73	67.16	SR 625 (Waxpool Road / Church Road) – Ashburn, Sterling, Pacific Boulevard south	
Loudoun	Sterling	42.31	68.09	Warp Drive	Northbound exit only
Loudoun	Sterling	43.91	70.67	SR 1793 (Nokes Boulevard / Gloucester Parkway) – Ashburn, Dulles Town Center	Cloverleaf interchange
Loudoun	Sterling	44.89	72.24	SR 1582 (Algonkian Parkway)	Southbound entrance only
Loudoun	Sterling	44.89	72.24	SR 7 west (Leesburg Pike) – Leesburg, Winchester, Inova Health System Loudoun Hospital	Northern terminus
Loudoun	Sterling	44.89	72.24	SR 7 east (Leesburg Pike) – Tysons Corner, Falls Church	Northern terminus
1.000 mi = 1.609 km; 1.000 km = 0.621 mi: Incomplete access; Tolled

< SR 27	Two‑digit State Routes; 1923-1933	SR 29 >
