= Virginia State Route 7 =

State highway in northern Virginia, US

State Route 7

Route information
- Maintained by VDOT
- Length: 72.7 mi (117.0 km)
- Existed: July 1, 1933–present

Major junctions
- West end: US 11 / US 522 in Winchester
- I-81 in Winchester; US 340 near Berryville; US 15 in Leesburg; SR 28 near Sterling; SR 267 Toll in Tysons; I-495 in Tysons; I-66 near Falls Church; US 50 at Seven Corners; I-395 in Alexandria; US 1 in Alexandria
- East end: SR 400 in Alexandria

Location
- Country: United States
- State: Virginia
- Counties: Winchester, Frederick, Clarke, Loudoun, Fairfax, Falls Church, Alexandria, Arlington

Highway system
- Virginia Routes; Interstate; US; Primary; Secondary; Byways; History; HOT lanes
← SR 6	→ SR 8

Virginia State Route 7 (VA 7) is a major primary state highway and busy commuter route in Northern Virginia, United States. It travels southeast from Downtown Winchester to Washington Street (SR 400) in Downtown Alexandria. Its route largely parallels those of the Washington & Old Dominion Trail and the Potomac River. Between its western terminus and I-395, SR 7 is part of the National Highway System. In 1968, the Virginia State Highway Commission designated the road as the "Harry Flood Byrd Highway" between Alexandria and Winchester to commemorate Harry F. Byrd Sr. (1887–1966).

== Route description ==
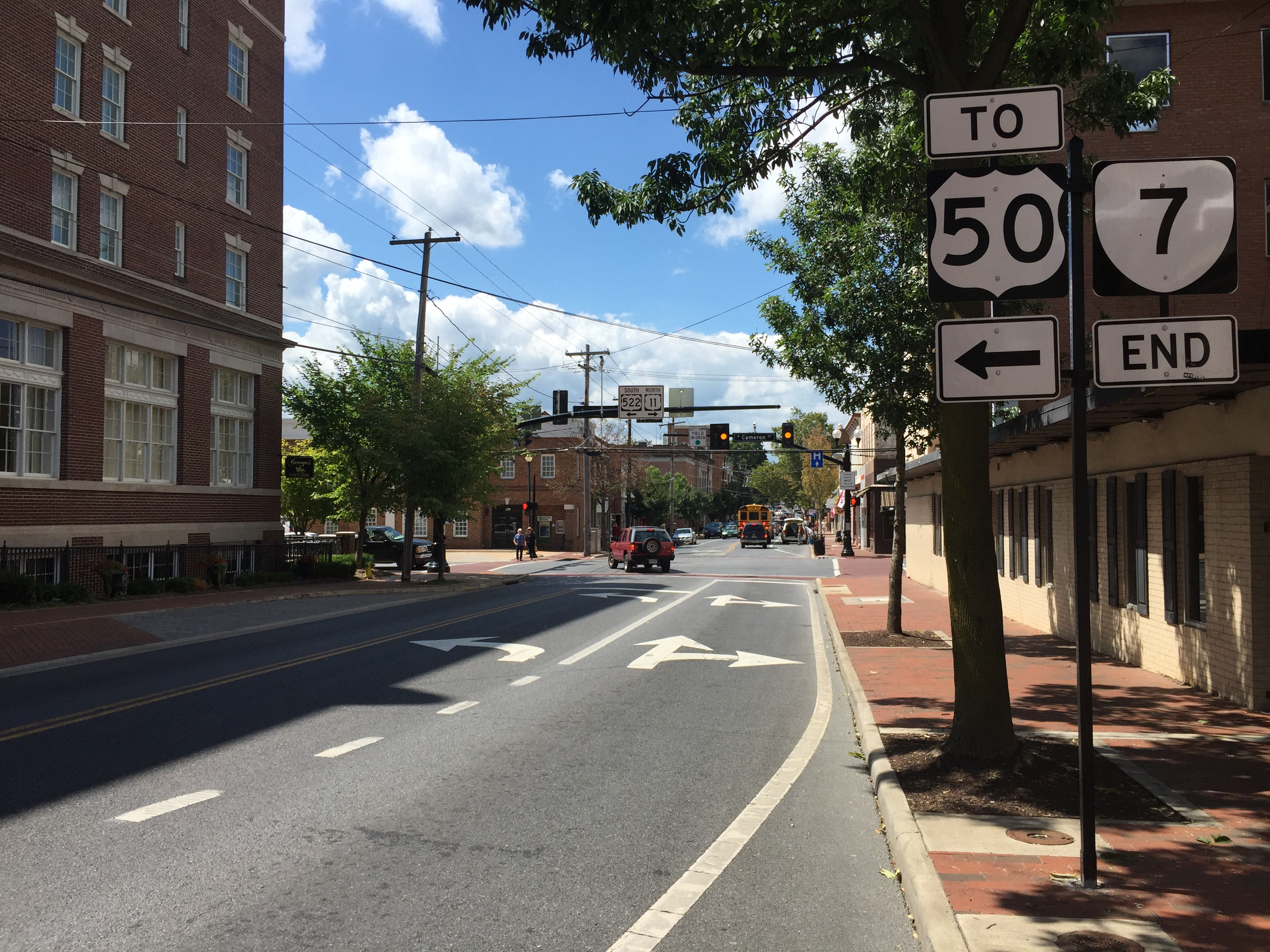
The west end of SR 7 at US 11/US 522 in Winchester

SR 7 begins downtown in the independent city of Winchester, as East Piccadilly Street at an intersection of Cameron Street (Route 11/Route 522), and it continues through the east end of the city, along North East Lane, National Avenue, and finally Berryville Avenue. SR 7 exits the city into surrounding Frederick County, where its name changes to Berryville Pike and it becomes a four-lane highway. SR 7 continues across the overpass of I-81 and then into Clarke County.

SR 7 enters Clarke County from Frederick County, crossing Opequon Creek, and continues towards the town of Berryville. Business SR 7 splits off just west of Berryville and passes through the town, while the main route bypasses the town to the north. Both routes cross Route 340, and Business SR 7 rejoins SR 7 just east of the town. SR 7 crosses the Shenandoah River and its name changes to the Harry Flood Byrd Highway. SR 7 crosses the Loudoun–Clarke county line and the Appalachian Trail at the summit of Snickers Gap in the Blue Ridge Mountains.

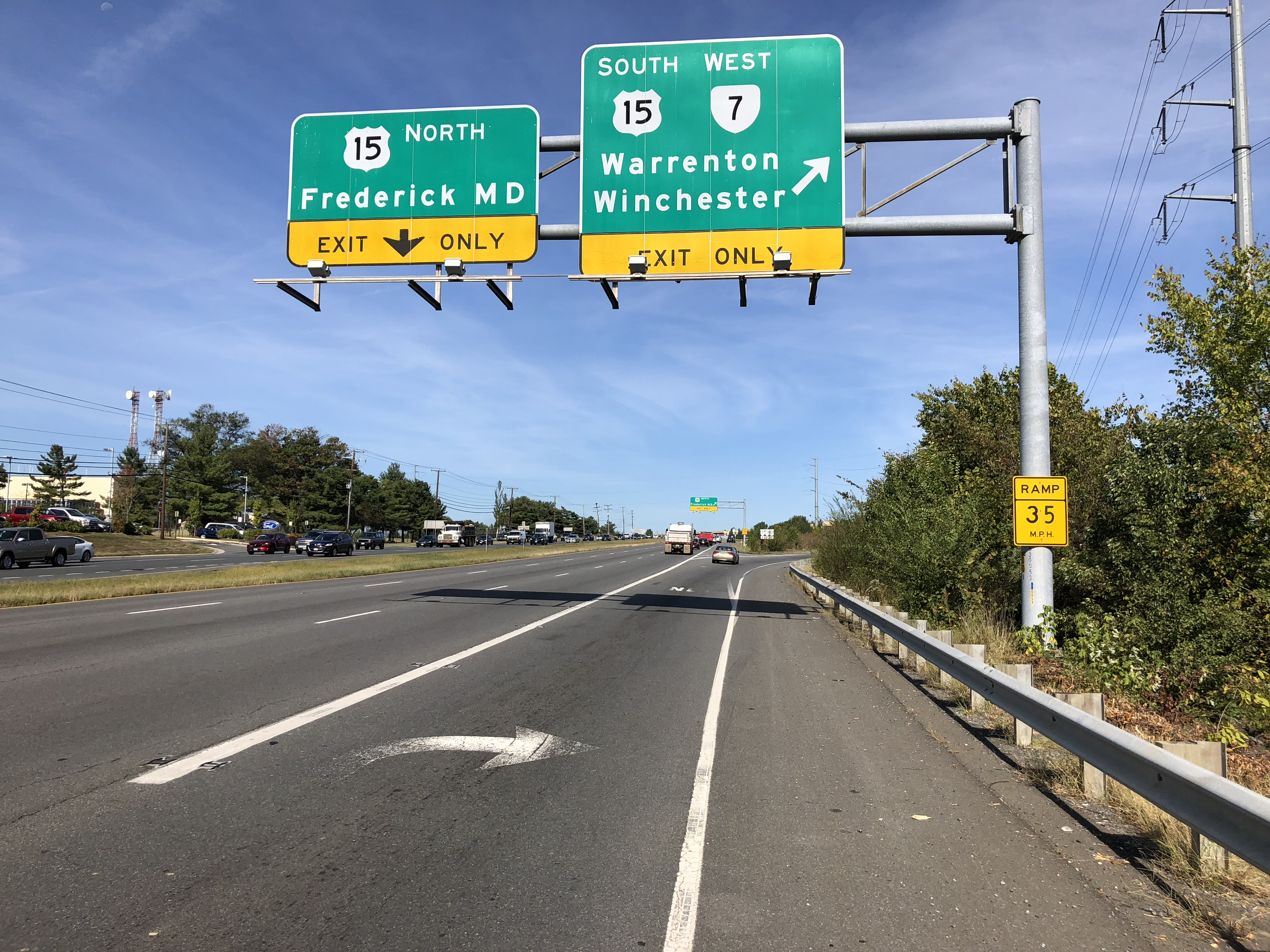
View west along SR 7 at US 15 in Leesburg

SR 7 descends out of the Blue Ridge Mountains and enters the rural western area of Loudoun County as Leesburg Pike at Snickers Gap. It intersects the northern end of the Snickersville Turnpike, and then it passes just north of the village of Bluemont (formerly Snickersville). Next SR 7 curves just south of Jefferson County, West Virginia.

SR 7 becomes a divided, limited-access highway with a speed limit of 55 mph (89 km/h) just west of Round Hill, where another Business SR 7 splits off to serve the towns of Round Hill, Purcellville, and Hamilton, while the main road runs outside of the towns as a bypass. Business SR 7 rejoins the main road at the interchange with SR 9 in Paeonian Springs.

SR 7 continues towards the well-developed eastern half of Loudoun County as a four-lane divided highway with some at-grade intersections, and it passes through Clarke's Gap in Catoctin Mountain. Another Business SR 7 splits off on the western side of Leesburg, the county seat of Loudoun County. The main road continues as the Leesburg Bypass, and merges with the bypass of Route 15 around the southern side of Leesburg, while the business route passes through town as Market Street. SR 7 Business intersects with King Street (Business Route 15) by the county courthouse in the center of Leesburg.

The Virginia Department of Transportation has plans to widen the section of SR 7 between SR 9 and East Market Street. However, due to highway budget restrictions, this project was put on hold in June 2008. In December 2014, construction began on the widening of this section of SR 7. In addition to widening Westbound SR 7 from two to three lanes, the median was modified to limit left turns into and out of Roxbury Hall Road, Leeland Orchard Road, White Gate Place, and Beechnut Place. In addition to the work on SR 7, roundabouts were installed at the interchange between SR 7 and SR 9. The southern roundabout combined the separate intersections of the on and off ramps from SR 7 and Colonial Highway/Dry Mill Road into one.

The SR 7 bypass crosses the Washington & Old Dominion Trail just before the US 15 bypass splits off from SR 7 in eastern Leesburg, and then SR 7 Bus. rejoins the main highway near the same location. SR 7 continues on through the eastern half of Leesburg, with six lanes. It crosses Goose Creek and passes through Ashburn.

SR 7 was rebuilt as a controlled-access highway through eastern portions of Loudoun County. To accomplish this, highway interchanges were constructed replacing the ordinary intersections at Belmont Ridge Road, Claiborne Parkway, Ashburn Village Boulevard, and Loudoun County Parkway while closing the intersection of Lexington Drive. A new overpass was constructed to carry Sycolin Road across SR 7 in Leesburg, which opened to traffic on August 11, 2014. An additional interchange was also opened at Battlefield Parkway in Leesburg on June 28, 2021.

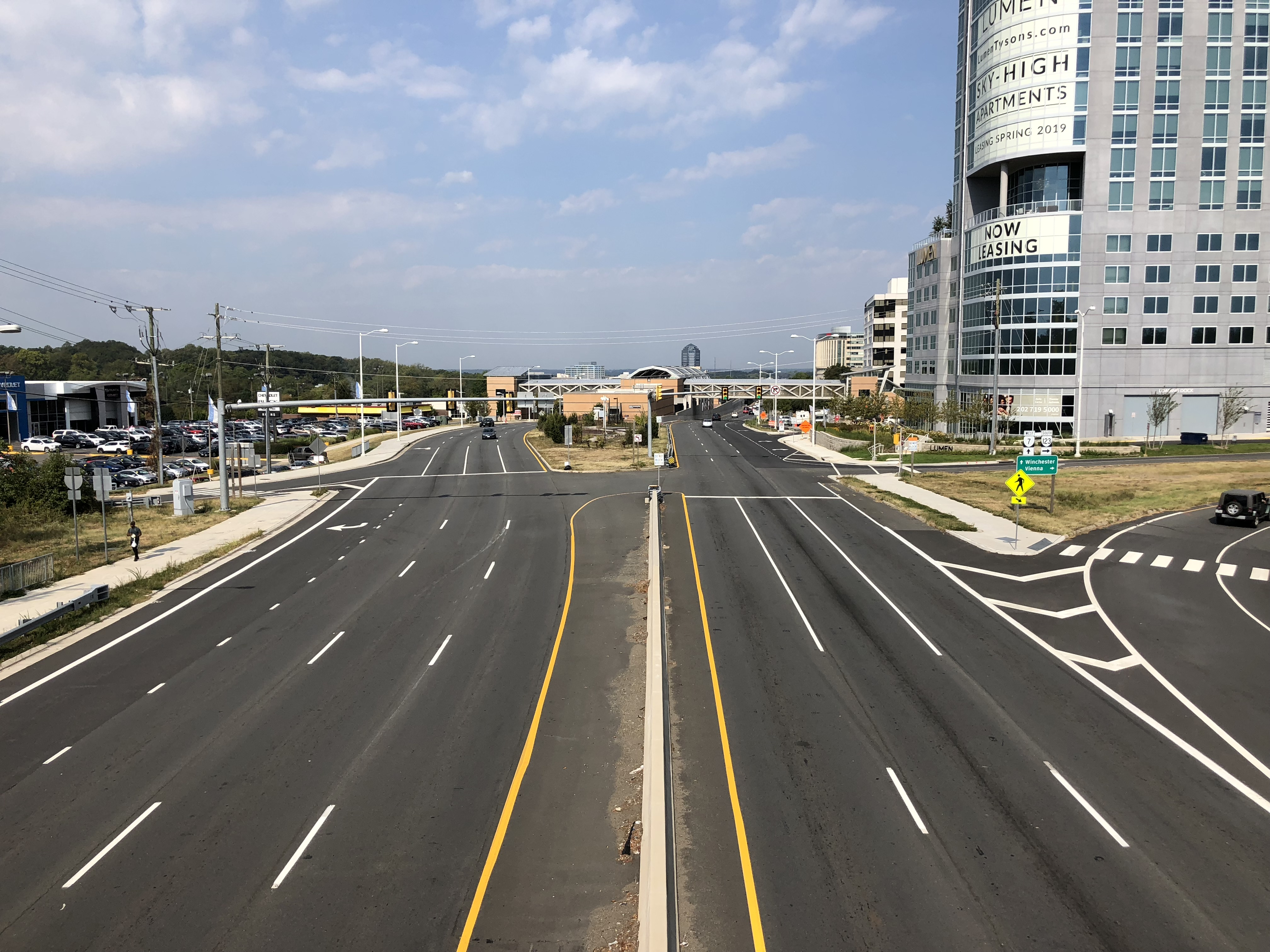
View west along SR 7 from SR 123 in Tysons

SR 7 continues as a controlled-access freeway and passes by numerous housing subdivisions, businesses, and shopping areas between an interchange with SR 28 and the Fairfax County line in Sterling.

SR 7 is named Leesburg Pike all the way across Fairfax County, where it is mainly a suburban route. It enters Fairfax County at the intersection of Dranesville Road (SR 228), approximately half a mile west of the interchange with the Fairfax County Parkway (SR 286) and Algonkian Parkway. It continues through Fairfax County, passing by subdivisions in Great Falls, Vienna, and Reston. Then it passes through Tysons, where it has interchanges with the Dulles Access and Toll Roads (SR 267) and SR 123. In between these two intersections, the Washington Metro's Silver Line runs through its median. After passing south of the Tysons Corner Center shopping mall, it interchanges with the Capital Beltway (I-495) in McLean and interchanges with I-66 a half mile (0.8 km) west of the West Falls Church Metro Station.

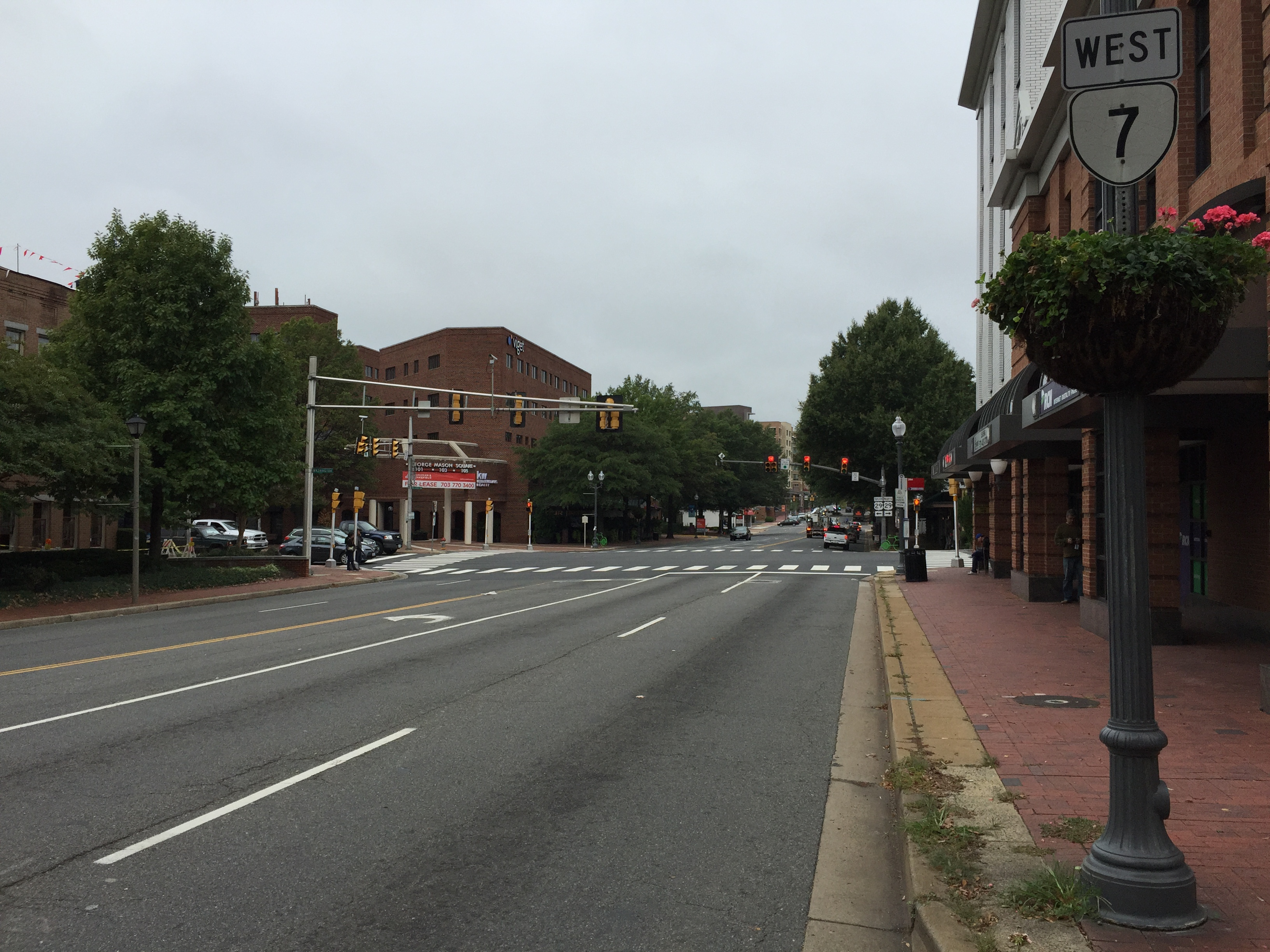
View west along SR 7 in downtown Falls Church

SR 7 enters Falls Church and becomes Broad Street and marks the north/south division for city streets. The road intersects with Washington Street (US 29) in the city's center and crosses the Washington & Old Dominion Trail in the city's west end. SR 7 re-enters Fairfax County as Leesburg Pike and passes through Seven Corners, named for the five roads that intersect, including Hillwood Avenue (SR 338) and Arlington Boulevard (Route 50), which is grade separated from the rest of the intersection. From there, it travels to Bailey's Crossroads, where it interchanges with Columbia Pike (SR 244).

SR 7 enters Alexandria from Fairfax County and briefly forms the border between Alexandria and Arlington County, and then interchanges with I-395. It continues as King Street through Alexandria, passing by Alexandria City High School, George Washington Masonic National Memorial, Union Station (Amtrak and Virginia Railway Express), and the King Street–Old Town Metro station. SR 7 ends at the intersection of King Street and Washington Street (SR 400) in Old Town Alexandria, one quarter of a mile (0.4 km) west of the Potomac River.

== Future ==
=== Intersection at Baron Cameron Avenue ===
On August 19, 2019, a third left-turn lane was added from SR 7 west to Baron Cameron Avenue. This was in place of constructing a partial interchange at the intersection, for which SR 7 east lanes would travel under Baron Cameron Avenue; the project was never started, as the Virginia Department of Transportation failed to allocate sufficient funding for the project and lack of competition led to higher than forecasted bids for the Route 7 widening.

=== Fairfax County widening project ===
The Virginia Department of Transportation is working on widening SR 7 from four to six lanes and adding shared-use paths along SR 7 between Reston Avenue and Jarrett Valley Drive in Fairfax County. The project is expected to cost $313.9 million and should be completed by mid-2024.

=== Renaming the highway in Loudoun County ===
The Loudoun County Board of Supervisors voted to rename the section of SR 7 within Loudoun County from Harry Byrd Highway to Leesburg Pike on December 7, 2021. This is in an effort to restore historical names and remove segregationist and Confederate symbols throughout the county.

=== Route 690 interchange ===
On May 1, 2026, a groundbreaking ceremony took place for a highway interchange with Virginia State Route 690. The project is meant to relive traffic on Virginia State Route 287 and to improve access to Mountain View Elementary and Woodgrove High School. The project's budget is $64.5 million with planned completion set for winter of 2029.

== Major intersections ==
County	Location	mi	km	Destinations	Notes
City of Winchester		0.0	0.0	US 11 / US 522 (Cameron St) to US 50	Western terminus; road continues as East Piccadilly Street
Frederick		1.5	2.4	I-81 – Martinsburg, Roanoke	Exit 315 (I-81)
Clarke		8.8	14.2	SR 7 Bus. east (W Main St) – Berryville	To Berryville Historic District
Clarke		10.4	16.7	US 340 – Berryville, Charles Town	Interchange
Clarke		12	19	SR 7 Bus. west (E Main St) – Berryville	
Clarke	Webbtown	13	21	SR 608 (Wickliffe Rd) – Wickliffe	Former SR 282 north
Blue Ridge		18.6	29.9	Snickers Gap	
Loudoun		19.1	30.7	SR 734 (Snickersville Pike)	
Loudoun		19.5	31.4	SR 760 (Clayton Hall Rd) to SR 734 – Bluemont, Philomont	Truck access to SR 734; former SR 234 south
Loudoun		22.5	36.2	SR 7 Bus. east (W Loudoun St) – Round Hill	
Loudoun		23.7	38.1	SR 7 Bus. – Round Hill, Purcellville	Interchange
Loudoun	Purcellville	27.6	44.4	SR 287 to SR 7 Bus. – Purcellville, Lovettsville	Interchange
Loudoun	Hamilton	29.7	47.8	SR 704 – Hamilton	Interchange
Loudoun	Clarks Gap	32	51	SR 9 / SR 7 Bus. east – Hillsboro, Charles Town, WV, Purcellville	Interchange
Loudoun		34.2	55.0	SR 7 Bus. east – Leesburg	Interchange
Loudoun	Leesburg	36	58	US 15 south / US 15 Bus. north – Leesburg, Warrenton	Interchange; west end of concurrency with US 15; access eastbound SR 7 to US 15 via Clubhouse Drive
Loudoun	Leesburg	36.8	59.2	SR 267 Toll east – Dulles Airport, Washington	Exit 1 (SR 267); western terminus of SR 267
Loudoun	Leesburg	37.8	60.8	US 15 north / SR 7 Bus. west / Fort Evans Rd – Frederick MD, Leesburg	Interchange; east end of concurrency with US 15
Loudoun	Leesburg	38.6	62.1	Battlefield Pkwy – Leesburg Airport	Interchange
Loudoun	Leesburg	39.5	63.6	River Creek Pkwy/Crosstrail Blvd	Interchange
Loudoun	Belmont–Lansdowne line	40.7	65.5	SR 659 (Belmont Ridge Rd)	Interchange
Loudoun	Ashburn Junction	41.8	67.3	SR 901 south (Claiborne Pkwy) / SR 2400 north (Lansdowne Blvd) – Lansdowne, Ashburn	Interchange
Loudoun	Ashburn–Lansdowne line	42.6	68.6	SR 2020 (Ashburn Village Blvd) – Shenandoah University	Interchange
Loudoun	Ashburn–University Center line	43.8	70.5	SR 607 (Loudoun County Pkwy) to SR 267	Interchange
Loudoun	Dulles Town Center	45.1	72.6	SR 28 south – Dulles Airport, Centreville	Interchange; northern terminus of SR 28
Loudoun	Dulles Town Center–Countryside line	45.6	73.4	SR 1582 (Algonkian Pkwy/Atlantic Blvd) – Dulles Town Center	Interchange
Loudoun	Dulles Town Center–Cascades line	47	76	SR 1794 (Cascades Pkwy) – Cascades, Sterling	Interchange
Loudoun	Sterling–Sugarland Run line	48.1	77.4	SR 846 (Cardinal Glen Cir/Sterling Blvd) – Sterling Park	
Fairfax	Herndon Junction	49	79	SR 228 south (Dranesville Rd)	
Fairfax	Dranesville	49.4	79.5	SR 286 south (Fairfax County Pkwy) / SR 6220 north (Algonkian Pkwy)	Interchange; northern terminus of SR 286; southern terminus of SR 6220
Fairfax	Dranesville	50.7	81.6	SR 193 east (Georgetown Pike) / SR 602 north – Great Falls, Langley	West end of the concurrency with SR 602; western terminus of SR 193
Fairfax	Reston	51.3	82.6	SR 602 south (Reston Pkwy)	East end of the concurrency with SR 602
Fairfax	Browns Chapel	52.9	85.1	SR 606 west (Baron Cameron Ave) / SR 674 (Springvale Rd) – Herndon, Reston	
Fairfax	Tysons	57.8	93.0	SR 267 Toll – Washington, Dulles Airport (via Dulles Access Road)	Exits 16A-B eastbound, 16 westbound (SR 267)
Fairfax	Tysons	59.1	95.1	SR 123 to I-495 – McLean, Vienna	Interchange
Fairfax	Tysons	59.5	95.8	SR 684 to I-495 Express north / International Dr/Gallows Rd	
Fairfax	Tysons	59.7	96.1	Fashion Blvd – Tysons Corner Center	
Fairfax	Tysons	60.1	96.7	I-495 (Capital Beltway) / I-495 Express south – Rockville, Baltimore, Richmond, Alexandria	Exits 47A-B (I-495)
Fairfax	Idylwood	61.4	98.8	I-66 – Washington, Front Royal, West Falls Church	Exit 66 eastbound, 66A-B westbound (I-66)
City of Falls Church		63.3	101.9	US 29 (Washington St) / SR 237	
Fairfax	Seven Corners	64.2	103.3	SR 338 west (Hillwood Ave) to US 29	Westbound exit and eastbound entrance
Fairfax	Seven Corners	64.4	103.6	US 50 (Arlington Blvd) / SR 613 (Wilson Blvd/Sleepy Hollow Rd) – Washington, Arlington, Clarendon, Fairfax	Interchange
Fairfax	Bailey's Crossroads	66.4	106.9	SR 244 (Columbia Pike) – Arlington, Annandale	Interchange
City of Alexandria		68.5	110.2	I-395 – Richmond, Washington	Exit 5 (I-395)
City of Alexandria		69.3	111.5	SR 402 (N Quaker Ln)	
City of Alexandria		70.5	113.5	SR 420 (Janney's Ln)	
City of Alexandria		71.8	115.6	US 1 south (Henry St)	One-way pair
City of Alexandria		71.9	115.7	US 1 north (Patrick St)	One-way pair
City of Alexandria		72.7	117.0	SR 400 (Washington St) / George Washington Parkway	Eastern terminus; no left turn in any direction; continues east as King Street
1.000 mi = 1.609 km; 1.000 km = 0.621 mi: Concurrency terminus; Incomplete access

== Special routes ==
=== Berryville business route ===
State Route 7 Business
- Location: Berryville
- Length: 3.05 mi (4.91 km)

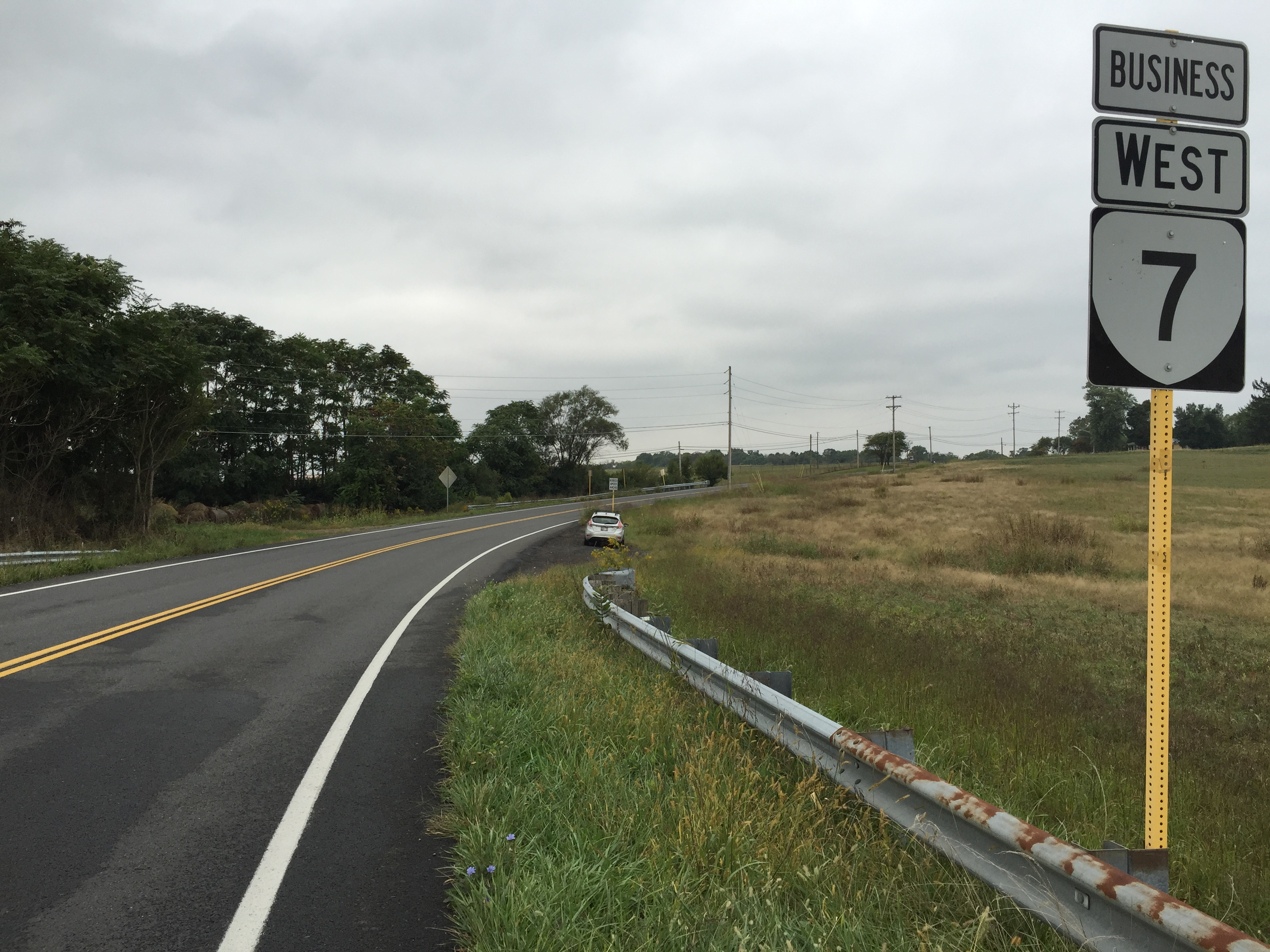
View west at the east end of SR 7 Bus. at SR 7 just east of Berryville

State Route 7 Business (SR 7 Bus.) is a business route in the U.S. state of Virginia. It follows Main Street through downtown Berryville.

=== Purcellville business route ===
State Route 7 Business
- Location: Purcellville
- Length: 9.28 mi (14.93 km)
- Existed: 1980–present
- Tourist routes: Virginia Byway

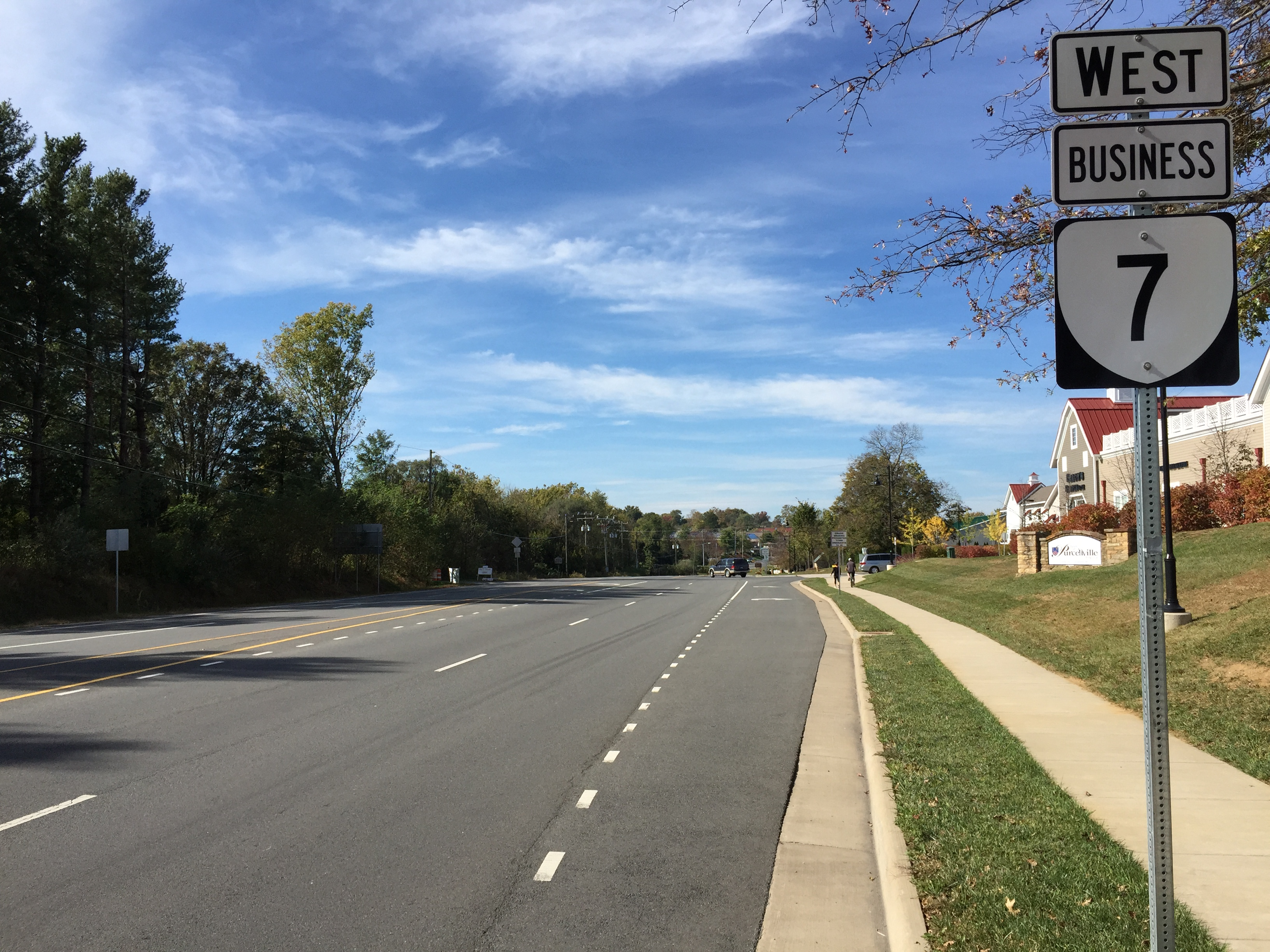
View west along SR 7 Bus. at SR 287 in Purcellville

State Route 7 Business (SR 7 Bus.) is a business route in the U.S. state of Virginia. It runs 9.28 miles (14.93 km) from SR 7 just west of Round Hill to SR 9 just west of Leesburg, where the roadway continues east and south as SR 699. The route provides access from the main route, SR 7, to Purcellville. The route has multiple names along its length including Loudoun Street, Main Street, and Colonial Highway. The route was formed in two segments. The first one was formed in 1980, and the second one was formed in 1987.

The route's western end is at its parent route, SR 7. It then intersects New Cut Road and Main Street, both part of SR 719. It meets SR 7 once again at a diamond interchange. After that, the route meets State Route 287 (SR 287) at a roundabout. The route's eastern end is at State Route 9 (SR 9) (Charles Town Pike), where it goes east and south as SR 699 (Dry Mill Rd.).

The first segment of the route was commissioned in 1980 between SR 287 and SR 9. The second segment of the route was commissioned in 1987 between SR 287 and SR 7. These segments were both designated along the former alignment of its parent route, SR 7.

=== Leesburg business route ===
State Route 7 Business
- Location: Leesburg
- Length: 2.39 mi (3.85 km)
- Tourist routes: Virginia Byway

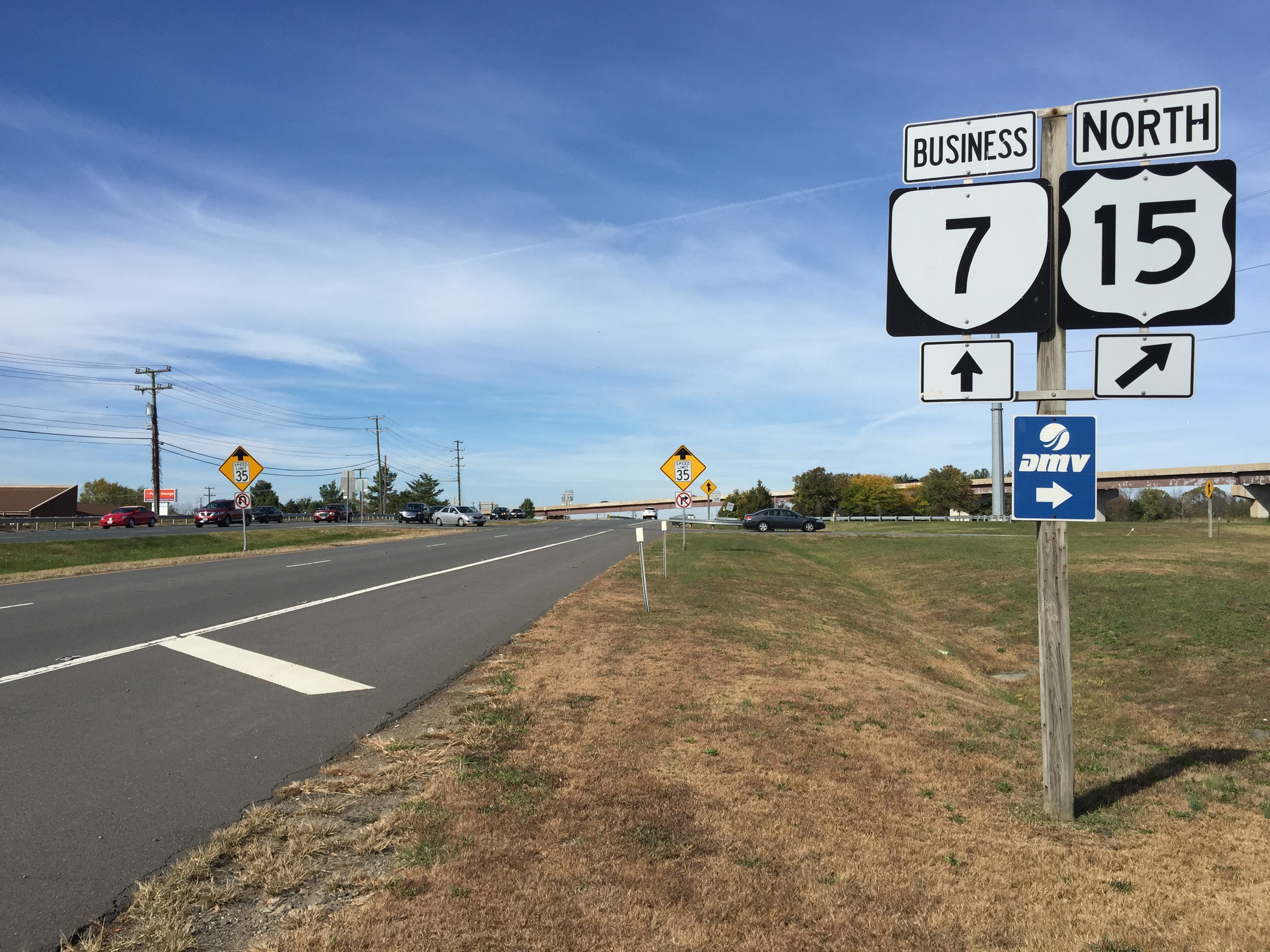
View west at the east end of SR 7 Bus. at US 15 in Leesburg

State Route 7 Business (SR 7 Bus.) is a business route in the U.S. state of Virginia. It follows Market Street through downtown Leesburg. In downtown Leesburg, SR 7 Bus. intersects with US 15 Bus.

< SR 53	Two‑digit State Routes; 1923-1933	SR 55 >
