= Franconia–Springfield Parkway =

State Route 289 in Springfield, Virginia, US

State Route 289
- Franconia–Springfield Parkway

Route information
- Maintained by VDOT
- Length: 3 mi (4.8 km)

Major junctions
- West end: SR 286 / SR 638 at West Springfield
- I-95 HOV lanes in Springfield
- East end: SR 613 in Franconia

Location
- Country: United States
- State: Virginia

Highway system
- Virginia Routes; Interstate; US; Primary; Secondary; Byways; History; HOT lanes
← SR 288	SR 289	→ SR 290

The Franconia–Springfield Parkway (SR 289, formerly SR 7900) is a short east–west spur near the south end of the Fairfax County Parkway, leading east through Springfield and serving the Franconia–Springfield Metro station. While SR 286 has access to the main lanes of I-95 (Shirley Highway), SR 289 interchanges with the reversible HOV lanes in the median of I-95.

In 2001, SR 289 was named the Joseph V. Gartlan Jr. Parkway. Joseph V. Gartlan Jr. was a state senator who served Fairfax County for 28 years. This name is ceremonial, and is rarely used by the public.

== Route description ==
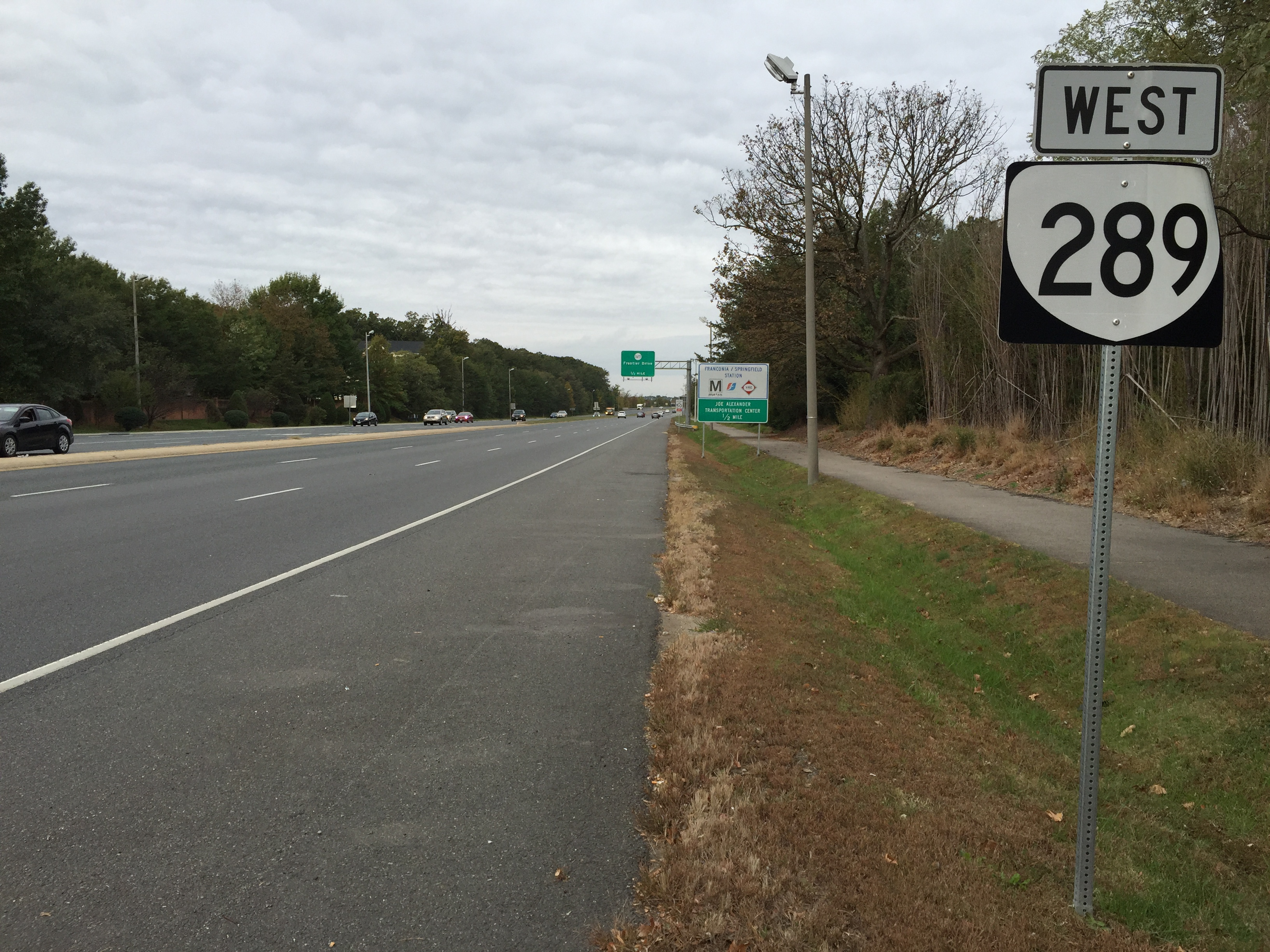
View west along SR 289 at SR 613 in Franconia

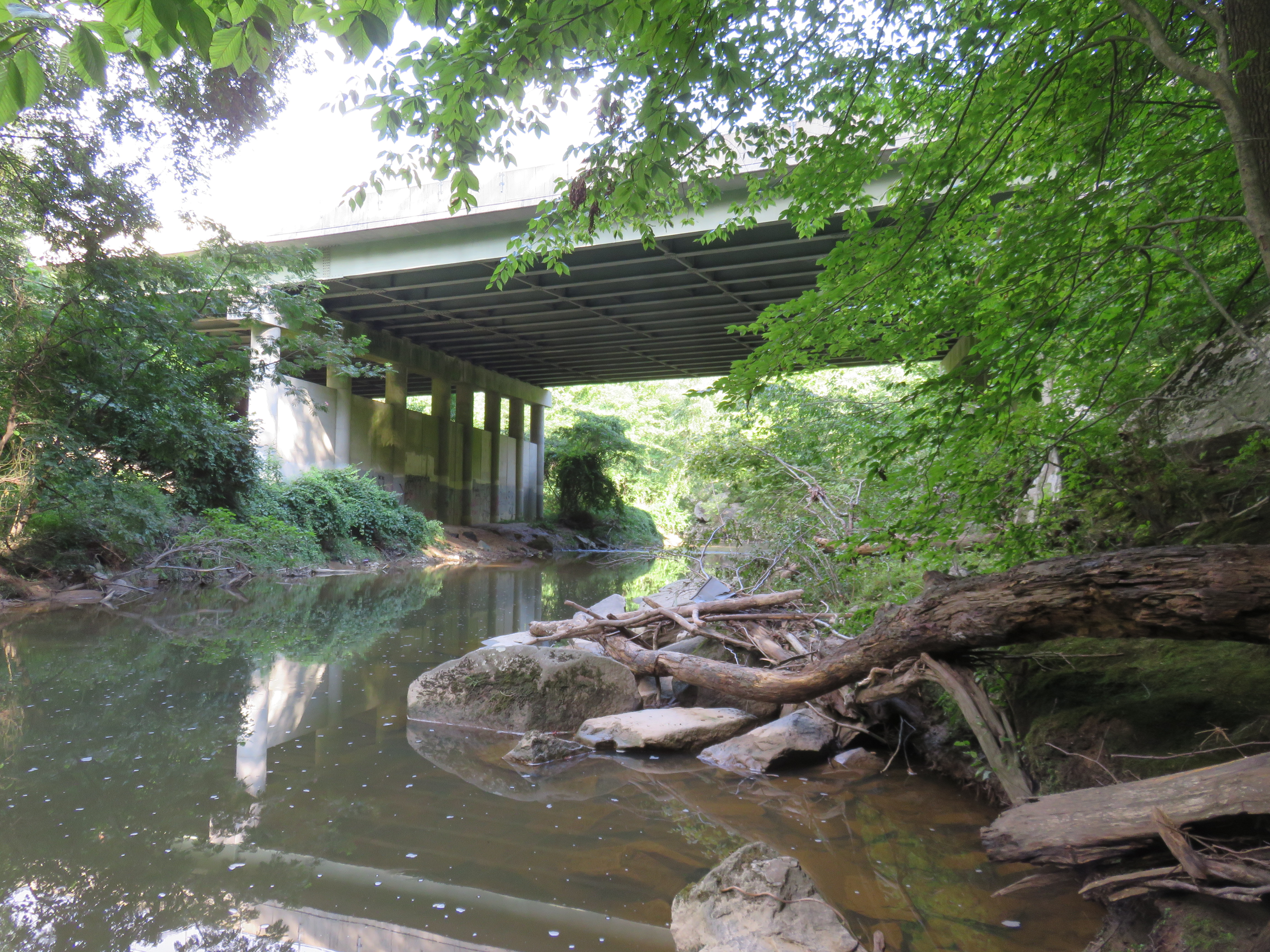
Franconia–Springfield Parkway crossing Accotink Creek

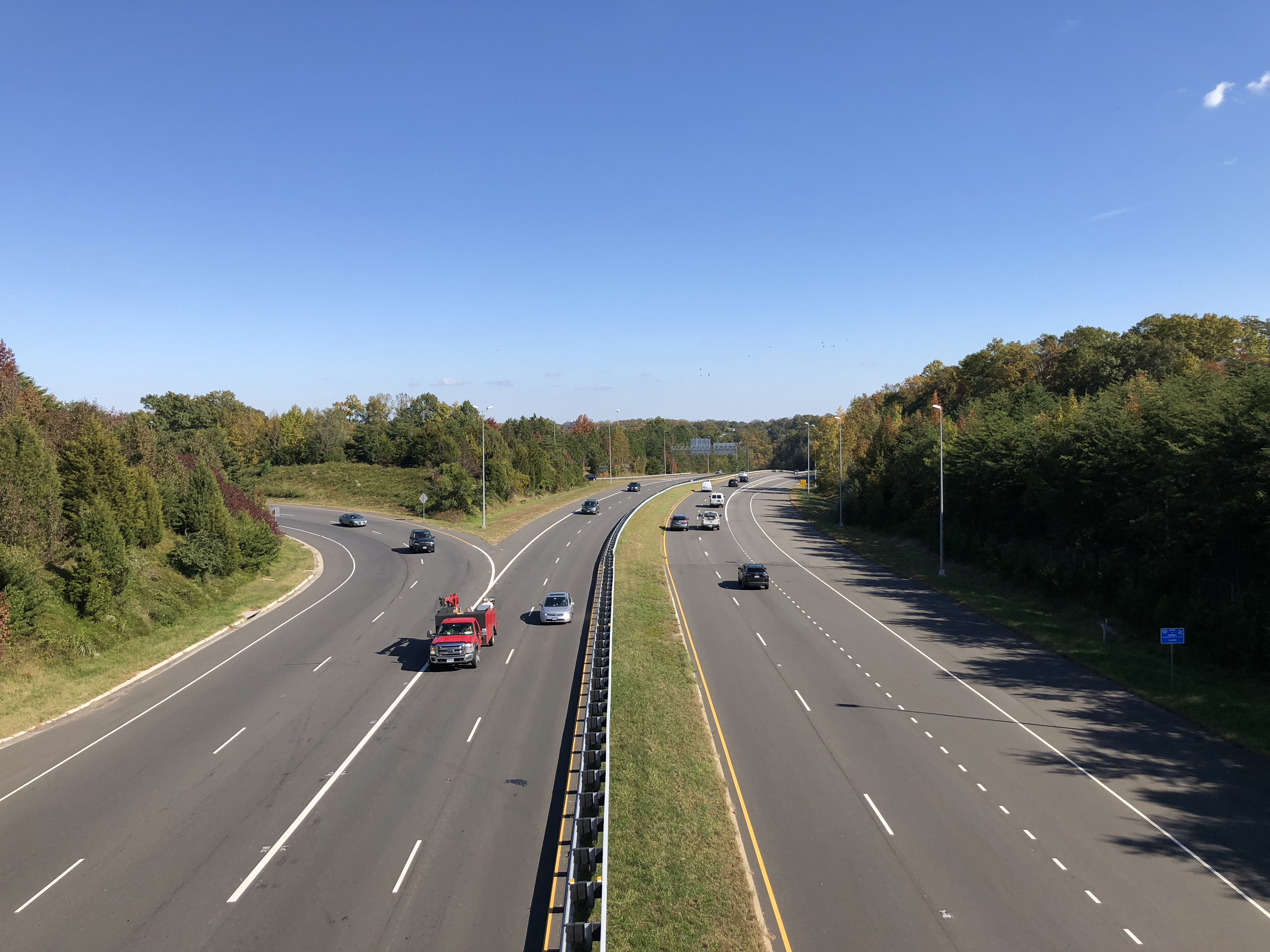
View east at the west end of SR 289 where it junctions with SR 286

Franconia–Springfield Parkway (SR 289) begins at an interchange with Rolling Road and the Fairfax County Parkway (SR 286). While the parkway follows the interchange ramps, the mainline of the roadway (heading eastbound) changes from SR 286 to SR 289 at the interchange. At approximately 1.2 miles (1.9 km), there is an at-grade intersection with Spring Valley Road. After an additional 0.6 miles (0.97 km), there is an interchange with Backlick Road, and immediately thereafter is an interchange with the HOV lanes of I-95. Next, an interchange with Frontier Drive provides access to Springfield Town Center and the Franconia–Springfield Metro station. The westbound lanes have a right-in/right-out junction with Walker Lane, after which SR 289 comes to an end at the intersection with Beulah Street, as the roadway continues on as Manchester Boulevard, leading to the Kingstowne development.

== History ==
The idea for the Springfield Bypass started in the 1970s as a bypass of SR 644 (Old Keene Mill Road) in Springfield. It was soon expanded, by 1978, to include most of what is now the Fairfax County Parkway, which had been originally planned as part of the unbuilt Outer Beltway. The Commonwealth Transportation Board approved final plans on July 16, 1987 for the 33-mile (53 km) road, including the spur to Franconia providing access to the Shirley Highway HOV lanes and the Franconia–Springfield Metrorail station.

The Franconia Spur was already known as Kingstowne Boulevard at its east end. By 1989, the permanent Franconia–Springfield Parkway name had been applied to the portion west of State Route 613 (Beulah Street); the rest of the road was not built as part of the project, and now carries the Manchester Boulevard and Kingstowne Boulevard names.

The first piece of the Franconia–Springfield Parkway, a short bypass of Hooes Road (SR 636) from Rolling Road (SR 638) east over Accotink Creek to near Lackawanna Drive, opened on August 7, 1989. The rest of this spur to Beulah Street (SR 613) in Franconia opened on June 8, 1992, along with the reversible HOV ramps to the Shirley Highway (I-95/I-395). (The Franconia–Springfield station did not open for Virginia Railway Express and Metrorail trains until four and five years later, respectively; the interchange at Frontier Drive serving the station opened in December 1995).

On February 16, 2012, the Franconia–Springfield Parkway was designated SR 289.

== Major intersections ==
The entire parkway is in Fairfax County.

Location	mi	km	Destinations	Notes
West Springfield	0.00	0.00	SR 286 (Fairfax County Parkway) / SR 638 (Rolling Road)	Western terminus; interchange
Springfield	1.60	2.57	SR 617 (Backlick Road)	Interchange
Springfield	1.72	2.77	I-95 Express	
Springfield	2.22	3.57	SR 2677 (Frontier Drive) to I-95	Interchange
Springfield			Franconia–Springfield Metro Station	Interchange; westbound access is at SR 2677
Franconia	3.08	4.96	SR 613 (Beulah Street) / Manchester Boulevard (SR 8113)	Eastern terminus
1.000 mi = 1.609 km; 1.000 km = 0.621 mi: Electronic toll collection; Incomplete access
