= Ox Road =

Ox Road may refer to:

- Hærvejen, an ancient trackway in Denmark and Germany, also known as Ox Road
- Virginia State Route 123, a highway in Virginia, United States, signed as Ox Road for part of the route
- Virginia State Route 606 (Fairfax and Loudoun Counties), a highway in Virginia, United States, signed as Old Ox Road for part of the route
- Virginia State Route 608 (Fairfax County), a highway in Virginia, United States, signed as West Ox Road for part of the route
