= Newington, Virginia =

- Census-designated place
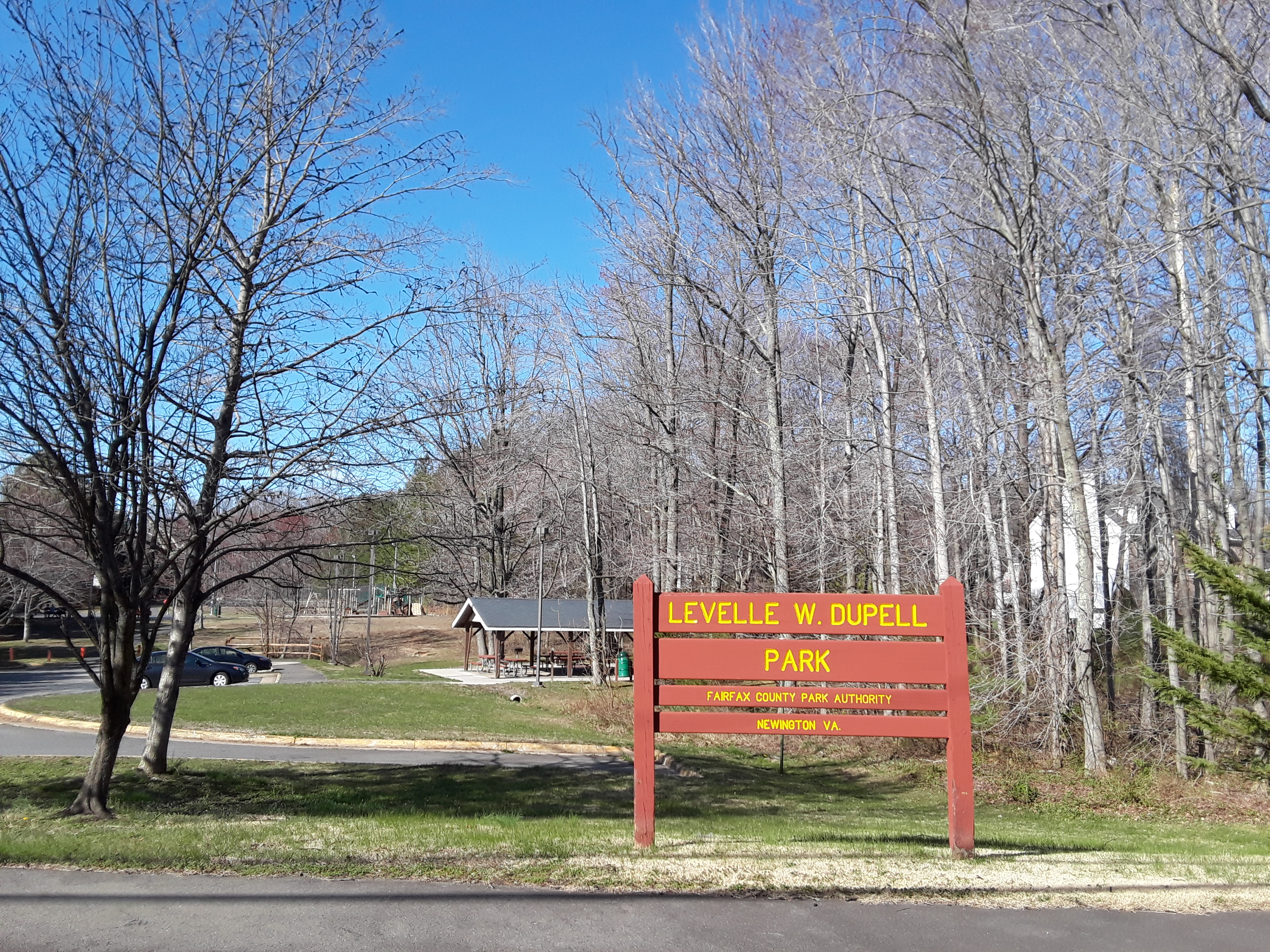
- Levelle W. Dupell Park in 2018

- Location of Newington in Fairfax County, Virginia

- Location within Northern Virginia Location within Virginia Location within the United States
- Coordinates: 38°44′7″N 77°12′13″W
- Country: United States
- State: Virginia
- County: Fairfax

Area
  - Total: 4.6 sq mi (11.9 km^{2})
  - Land: 4.6 sq mi (11.8 km^{2})
  - Water: 0.039 sq mi (0.1 km^{2})
- Elevation: 108 ft (33 m)

Population (2020)
  - Total: 13,223
  - Density: 2,844/sq mi (1,098.1/km^{2})
- Time zone: UTC−5 (Eastern (EST))
  - Summer (DST): UTC−4 (EDT)
- ZIP code: 22153
- Area code: 703
- FIPS code: 51-55752
- GNIS feature ID: 1495074

Newington is a census-designated place (CDP) in Fairfax County, Virginia, United States. As of the 2020 census, the population was 13,223. The population was 12,943 at the 2010 census. The 2010 census showed a significant decrease after half the population was split off to the newly created Newington Forest CDP.

While the ZIP code for Newington is 22122, this is only for delivery points within the post office itself. Homes and businesses in the CDP have Springfield or Lorton street addresses.

== Geography ==
Newington is located in southern Fairfax County at 38°44′7″N 77°12′13″W (38.735414, −77.203558). It is bordered to the north by Springfield, to the northeast by Franconia and Kingstowne, to the east and southeast by Fort Belvoir, to the southwest by Lorton, to the west by Newington Forest, and to the northwest by West Springfield. Interstate 95 passes through the middle of the CDP, with access from Exit 166 (Virginia Route 286, the Fairfax County Parkway). Washington, D.C. is 16 miles (26 km) to the northeast via I-95 and I-395, and Fredericksburg is 37 miles (60 km) to the southwest. The Fairfax County Parkway leads northwest 16 miles (26 km) to Interstate 66 between Fairfax and Centreville.

According to the United States Census Bureau, the Newington CDP has a total area of 4.6 square miles (11.9 km^{2}), of which 4.6 square miles (11.8 km^{2}) is land and 0.04 square miles (0.1 km^{2}), or 0.97%, is water.

== History ==
The community of Newington derives its name from the second glebe house of Truro Parish, completed in 1760 and so named after becoming the private residence of Richard and Sarah McCarty Chichester sometime after 1767. The house itself was purchased by the family of William Nevitt, in 1828, along with 1000 acres of land; they occupied the building until it burned in 1875. The Alexandria and Fredericksburg Railway opened a railway station on the property in April 1872. Originally known as the Long Branch Station and later renamed Accotink and then Newington, it was closed in 1971; it is remembered by a historic marker erected by the Fairfax County History Commission in 2005. Also in the Newington area are the remains of the Mount Air plantation, originally granted to Dennis McCarty in 1727. The house was destroyed by fire in 1992, but ruins remain; they, too, are denoted by a historic marker, erected in 2006, and are owned by the Fairfax County Park Authority, which interprets the site.

== Demographics ==
=== Racial and ethnic composition ===
Newington CDP, Virginia – Racial and ethnic composition Note: the US Census treats Hispanic/Latino as an ethnic category. This table excludes Latinos from the racial categories and assigns them to a separate category. Hispanics/Latinos may be of any race.
Race / Ethnicity (NH = Non-Hispanic)	Pop 2000	Pop 2010	Pop 2020	% 2000	% 2010	% 2020
White alone (NH)	12,528	6,623	5,697	63.32%	51.17%	43.08%
Black or African American alone (NH)	2,510	1,959	2,206	12.69%	15.14%	16.68%
Native American or Alaska Native alone (NH)	33	28	20	0.17%	0.22%	0.15%
Asian alone (NH)	2,287	1,856	2,234	11.56%	14.34%	16.89%
Native Hawaiian or Pacific Islander alone (NH)	14	11	9	0.07%	0.08%	0.07%
Other race alone (NH)	58	58	86	0.29%	0.45%	0.65%
Mixed race or Multiracial (NH)	776	575	784	3.92%	4.44%	5.93%
Hispanic or Latino (any race)	1,578	1,833	2,187	7.98%	14.16%	16.54%
Total	19,784	12,943	13,223	100.00%	100.00%	100.00%

=== 2020 census ===
As of the 2020 census, Newington had a population of 13,223. The median age was 38.5 years. 23.5% of residents were under the age of 18 and 13.8% were 65 years of age or older. For every 100 females there were 92.5 males, and for every 100 females age 18 and over there were 90.5 males age 18 and over.

100.0% of residents lived in urban areas, while 0.0% lived in rural areas.

There were 4,363 households in Newington, of which 38.0% had children under the age of 18 living in them. Of all households, 62.5% were married-couple households, 12.0% were households with a male householder and no spouse or partner present, and 21.2% were households with a female householder and no spouse or partner present. About 15.7% of all households were made up of individuals and 6.6% had someone living alone who was 65 years of age or older.

There were 4,469 housing units, of which 2.4% were vacant. The homeowner vacancy rate was 0.6% and the rental vacancy rate was 4.8%. The population density was 2,874.6 inhabitants per square mile (1,111.2/km^{2}). The average housing unit density was 971.5 per square mile (375.5/km^{2}).

=== Demographic estimates ===
As of 2022, 4.9% of residents had Italian ancestry, 36.3% spoke a language other than English at home, and 26.6% were born outside the United States, 75.9% of whom were naturalized citizens.

=== Income and poverty ===
The median income for a household in the CDP was $160,243, and the median income for a family was $170,102. 12.3% of the population were military veterans, and 59.4% had a bachelors degree or higher. In the CDP 2.7% of the population was below the poverty line, including 1.1% of those under age 18 and 3.8% of those age 65 or over, with 4.3% of the population without health insurance.

=== 2010 census ===
The population was 12,943 at the 2010 census.

=== 2000 census ===
As of the census of 2000, there were 19,784 people, 6,710 households, and 5,321 families residing in the CDP. The population density was 2,977.8 inhabitants per square mile (1,149.7/km^{2}). There were 6,793 housing units at an average density of 1,022.5 per square mile (394.8/km^{2}). The racial makeup of the CDP was 67.80% White, 12.83% African American, 0.26% Native American, 11.66% Asian, 0.08% Pacific Islander, 2.66% from other races, and 4.71% from two or more races. Hispanic or Latino of any race were 7.98% of the population.

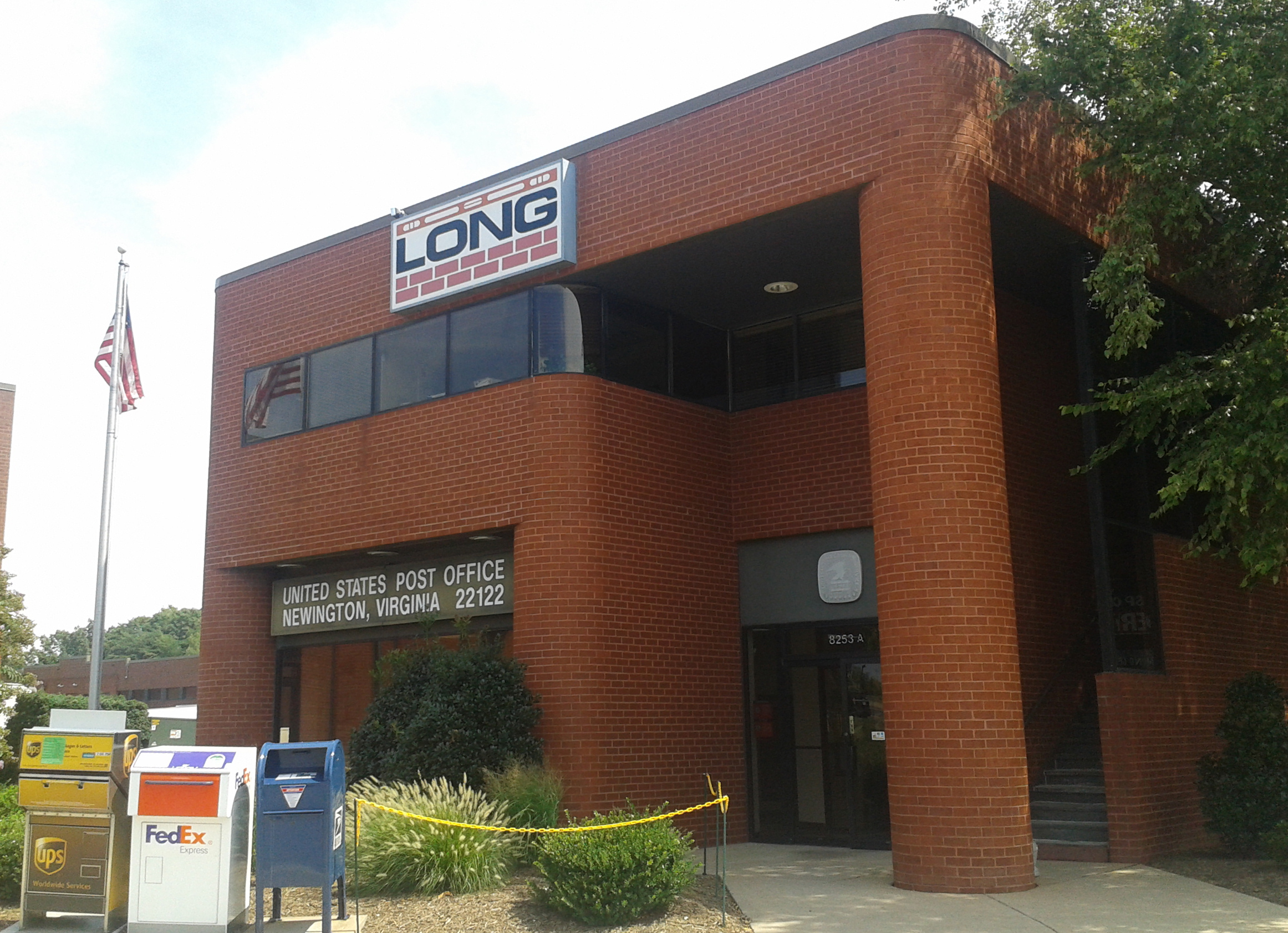
Post office in Newington

There were 6,710 households, out of which 43.4% had children under the age of 18 living with them, 66.6% were married couples living together, 9.7% had a female householder with no husband present, and 20.7% were non-families. 15.7% of all households were made up of individuals, and 5.0% had someone living alone who was 65 years of age or older. The average household size was 2.93 and the average family size was 3.28.

In the CDP, the population was spread out, with 28.5% under the age of 18, 6.3% from 18 to 24, 32.3% from 25 to 44, 26.1% from 45 to 64, and 6.8% who were 65 years of age or older. The median age was 36 years. For every 100 females, there were 96.1 males. For every 100 females age 18 and over, there were 91.9 males.

According to a 2007 estimate, the median income for a household in the CDP was $112,675, and the median income for a family was $119,001. Males had a median income of $58,203 versus $41,177 for females. The per capita income for the CDP was $32,901. About 1.3% of families and 2.1% of the population were below the poverty line, including 2.3% of those under age 18 and 2.2% of those age 65 or over.

== Education ==
Fairfax County Public Schools operates public schools in the county.

Fairfax County Public Library operates the Kingstowne Library.

== Climate ==
The climate in this area is characterized by hot, humid summers and generally cool to cold winters with moderate snowfall. Blizzards and major snowstorms are rare but not nonexistent, while summer thunderstorms are very common. According to the Köppen Climate Classification system, Newington has a "humid subtropical climate", abbreviated "Cfa" on climate maps.
