= Virginia State Route 602 (Fairfax County) =

Secondary US state highway

State Route 602

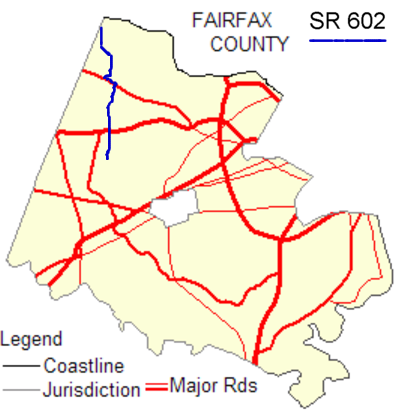

Route information
- Maintained by VDOT
- Length: 10.37 mi (16.69 km) Lawyers Road: 1.13 mi. Reston Parkway: 5.46 mi. Seneca Road: 3.78 mi.

Major junctions
- South end: SR 608 (West Ox Road) in Herndon
- SR 267 Toll (Dulles Toll Road) / SR 267 (Dulles Access Road) in Reston SR 606 (Baron Cameron Avenue) in Reston SR 7 (Leesburg Pike) on the Reston / Great Falls border
- North end: Loudoun County line

Location
- Country: United States
- State: Virginia

Highway system
- Virginia Routes; Interstate; US; Primary; Secondary; Byways; History; HOT lanes

State Route 602 in Fairfax County, Virginia is a secondary state highway which traverses the northwestern portion of the county. SR 602 is the main road through Reston, and connects with SR 608 (West Ox Road), SR 267 (Dulles Toll Road and Dulles Access Road), SR 606 (Baron Cameron Avenue), and SR 7 (Leesburg Pike). All these connections provide ample commuting opportunities for the residents of Reston and the residents of neighboring areas.

== Route description ==
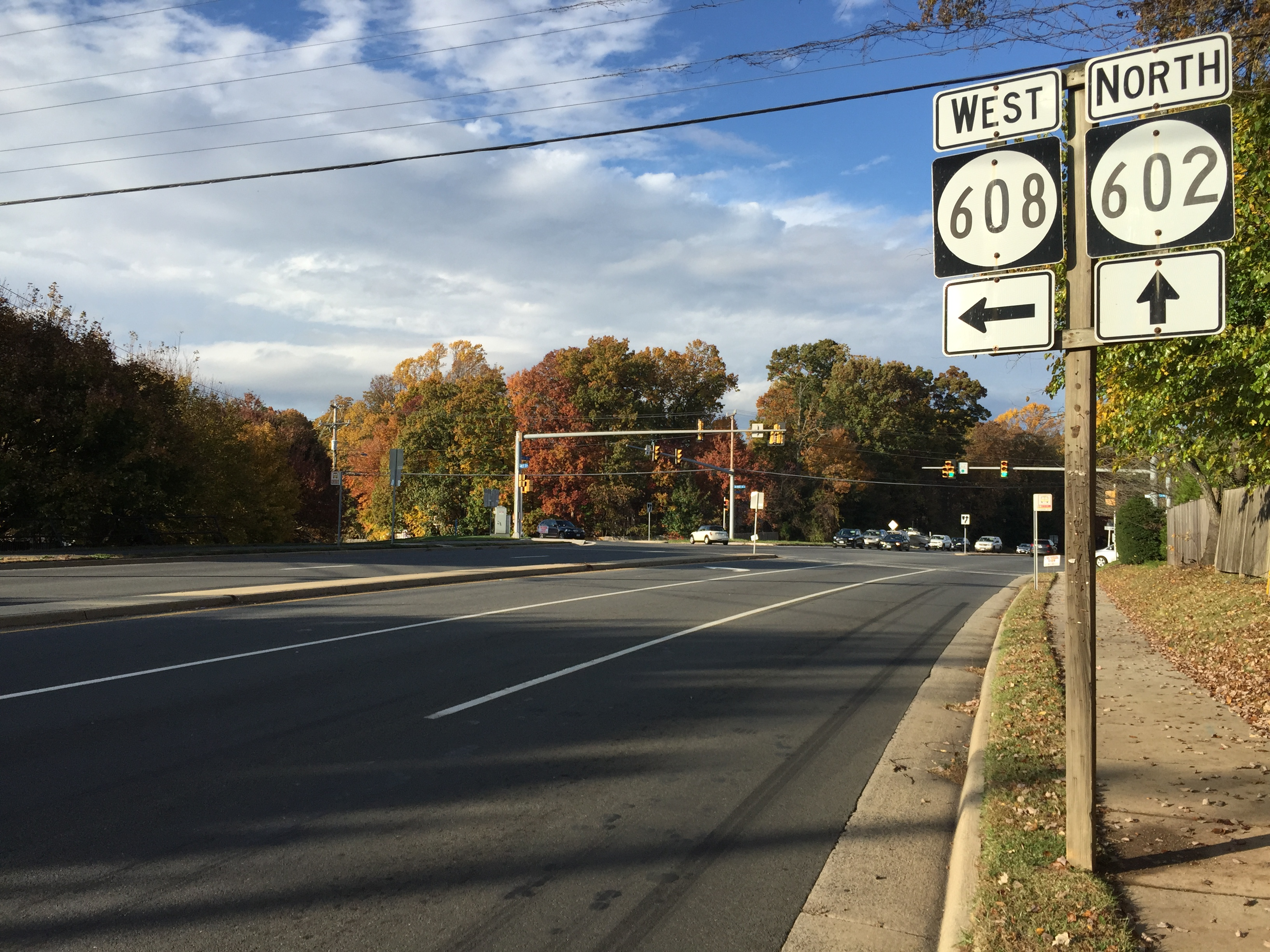
View north at the south end of SR 602 at SR 608 in Herndon

SR 602 uses three different names: Lawyers Road, Reston Parkway, and Seneca Road. There are also two short concurrencies: one with SR 7 (Leesburg Pike) and the other with SR 193 (Georgetown Pike).

=== Lawyers Road ===
SR 602 as Lawyers Road is a southern spur of SR 673, Lawyers Road, which forms the southern boundary of Reston and heads east into Vienna. This section of SR 602 is a four-lane divided road that travels northward between subdivisions of single-family homes.

=== Reston Parkway ===
At the intersection where Lawyers Road turns east as SR 673, SR 602 continues north as Reston Parkway. This road serves as the Main Street of busy Reston. It first passes SR 5320, Sunrise Valley Drive, which, to the east, is the address of many office buildings. It then passes SR 267, the Dulles Airport Access and Toll Roads, which lead to Dulles Airport, Leesburg, and Washington, D.C. via Interstate 66. The next major road that is passed is SR 675, Sunset Hills Road. This road goes to Herndon to the west, and many retail stores and offices to the east.

Traveling further north, one passes the Reston Town Center to the west, followed by many different retail and office centers. Reston Parkway then passes SR 606 (Baron Cameron Avenue), a major connector between Loudoun County and SR 7 (Leesburg Pike) toward Washington, D.C. The road continues through shopping centers and developments of single-family homes until it intersects with SR 7 (Leesburg Pike).

=== Seneca Road ===
After short concurrencies with SR 7 (Leesburg Pike) and SR 193 (Georgetown Pike), SR 602 continues north as Seneca Road, a two-lane road. This road is the westernmost north–south route in Great Falls that intersects with a primary state route, and so it is well traveled during commuting hours rush hour. The road passes by developments of large single-family homes, and the route ends at the Loudoun County border. It is considered a suburb of Great Falls. As Seneca Road continues into Loudoun County, it becomes a private road that serves only Lowes Island (Golf) Club. As well as hitting the Golf club the road hits the entrance of the Great Falls park.

== History ==
The portion of Reston Parkway the goes between Lawyers Road and Baron Cameron Avenue was originally Reston Avenue, a two-lane road (Reston Parkway is now 4 lanes in all places). North of Baron Cameron Avenue one can still find a part of the original Reston Avenue, as the northern part of Reston Parkway was aligned differently from Reston Avenue. This part of Reston Avenue was given the designation SR 7917.

== Major intersections ==
Location	mi	km	Destinations	Notes
Herndon	0.00	0.00	SR 608 (West Ox Road) – Herndon, Fairfax	Southern terminus of SR 602
Herndon	1.13	1.82	SR 665 south (Fox Mill Road) – Oakton	Fox Mill Road is split at SR 602. South only.
Reston			SR 665 north (Fox Mill Road) – Oakton	
Reston	2.77	4.46	SR 5320 (Sunrise Valley Drive) – Herndon, Reston	
Reston	3.10	4.99	SR 267 Toll (Dulles Toll Road) / SR 267 (Dulles Access Road) – Leesburg, Dulles Airport, McLean, Washington, D.C.	Interchange
Reston	3.44	5.54	SR 675 (Sunset Hills Road) – Herndon, Reston	
Reston	4.27	6.87	SR 606 (Baron Cameron Avenue) – Dulles, McLean	
Reston–Great Falls city line	6.59	10.61	SR 7 (Leesburg Pike) – McLean, Washington, D.C.	South end of SR 7 overlap; end of Reston Parkway
Reston–Great Falls city line	7.06	11.36	SR 7 (Leesburg Pike) / SR 193 begins (Georgetown Pike) – Leesburg	North end of SR 7 overlap; south end of SR 193 overlap
Great Falls	7.12	11.46	SR 193 (Georgetown Pike) – Leesburg, Arlington, Georgetown, Washington, D.C.	
Great Falls	10.90	17.54	Loudoun County line	North terminus of SR 602
1.000 mi = 1.609 km; 1.000 km = 0.621 mi: Concurrency terminus
