= Virginia State Route 608 (Fairfax County) =

State highway in Virginia, United States

State Route 608

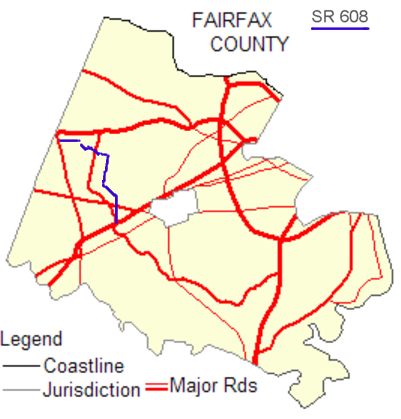

Route information
- Maintained by VDOT
- Length: 8.90 mi (14.32 km) West Ox Road: 7.90 mi. Frying Pan Road: 1.00 mi.

Major junctions
- South end: SR 286 (Fairfax County Parkway) / US 29 (Lee Highway) in Fairfax
- US 50 (Lee Jackson Memorial Highway) in Fairfax; SR 602 / Lawyers Rd. in Herndon
- North end: SR 28 (Sully Road) in Centreville / Herndon

Location
- Country: United States
- State: Virginia

Highway system
- Virginia Routes; Interstate; US; Primary; Secondary; Byways; History; HOT lanes

State Route 608 (SR 608) in Fairfax County, Virginia, is a secondary state highway which traverses the western portion of the county. Before the Fairfax County Parkway from US 29 to Reston was complete, SR 608 was the main north–south road in western Fairfax County.

== Route description ==
SR 608 uses two different names: West Ox Road and Frying Pan Road.

=== West Ox Road ===
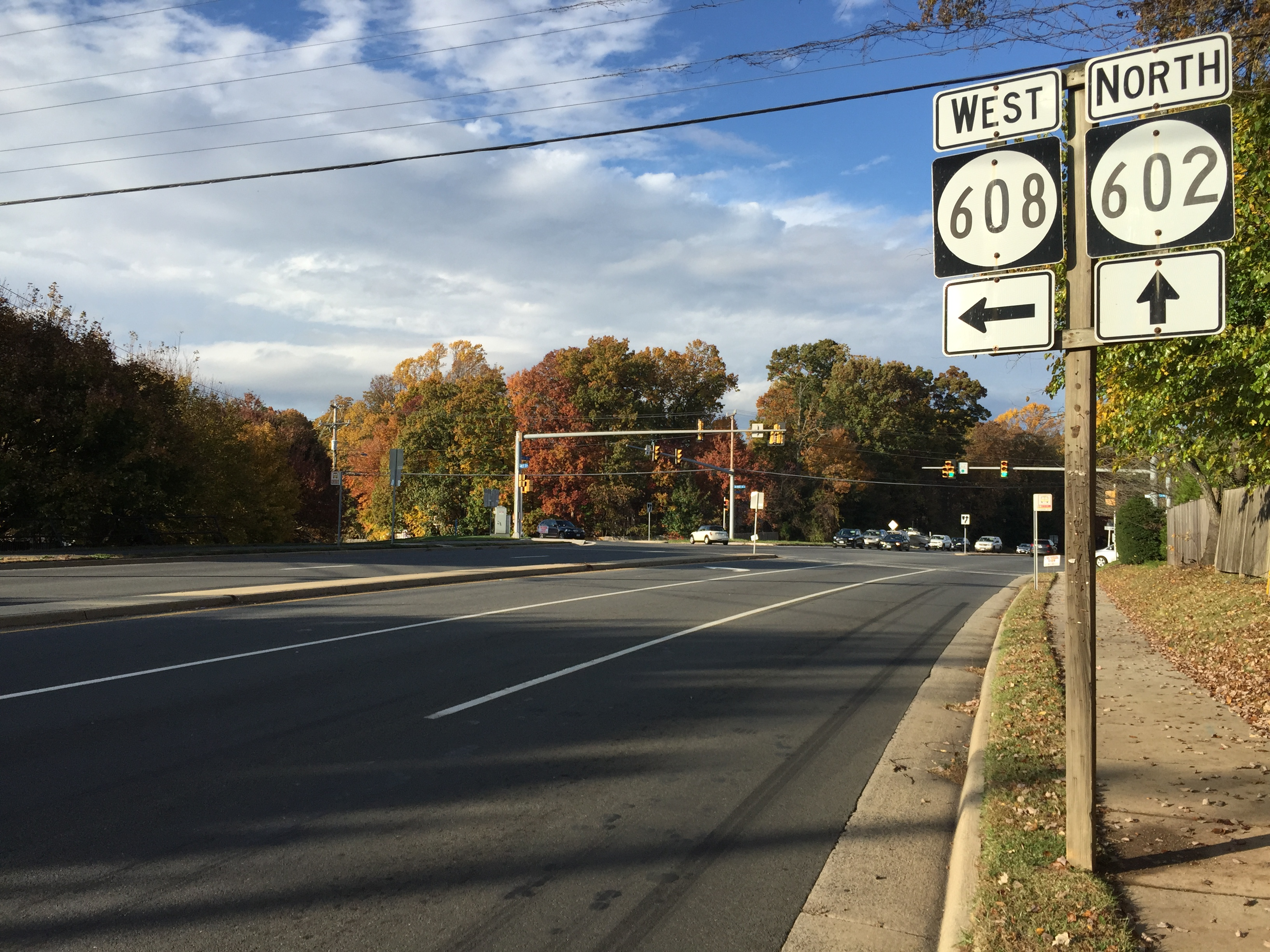
View northwest along SR 608 at SR 602

SR 608 starts as West Ox Road at an intersection / interchange with both SR 286 (Fairfax County Parkway) and US 29. This intersection is called by roadstothefuture.com as "The most complex one on the Parkway. Also, topped the list of most accident prone intersections in the county." From its southern origin to approximately the interchange with US 50, West Ox Road is a four to six lane divided highway. For the rest of its length it is a four lane divided highway.

West Ox Road passes SR 7435, Post Forest Drive. This is an entrance to the enclave where the Fairfax County Government Center and its associated offices are. It then passes SR 7700, Fair Lakes Parkway, which leads into Fair Lakes. A few blocks up on the left is the Fairfax Towne Centre.

West Ox Road then passes over US 50 in an interchange. It passes by Oakton to the east, curves to the west and back to the north, all the while passing by neighborhoods of single-family homes. Just south of the entrance to Reston, West Ox Road intersects with SR 602 (Lawyers Road). There one must head west to stay on SR 608. Otherwise, one ends up on SR 602 and winds up in Reston.

The western portion of West Ox Road is primarily a two lane road. It widens as it approaches an intersection with SR 286 (Fairfax County Parkway), and returns to two lanes after the intersection. It passes by smaller single-family houses and Frying Pan Farm Park, and intersects with SR 657 (Centreville Road), bends to the right and ends at SR 7605 (Copper Ridge Road).

=== Frying Pan Road ===
After a gap, SR 608 picks up at the intersection of Frying Pan Road and SR 657 (Centreville Road), passing past an office park with hotels, and ending at an interchange with SR 28 (Sully Road).

== History ==
West Ox Rd is a stretch of the original Ox Rd, first dug by Robert Carter I and the Frying Pan Mining Company in the 1720s atop a gentle ridge, with occasional views of the Bull Run Mountains and Blue Ridge to the west. It has been in constant use since then and has kept largely the same path.

West Ox Road was originally the main route between Fairfax and Reston before the Fairfax County Parkway was built. It was much more winding then; at one spot there was a barn about 2 feet from the two-lane roadway, where there was a hairpin turn, and SR 664 (Waples Mill Road) joined West Ox Road at a very sharp angle. Since then, the Virginia Department of Transportation (VDOT) has widened and straightened the road, and the intersection with Waples Mill Road has been re-engineered so that the two roads meet at a right angle. The project to widen and straighten the road was proposed in the 1980s, but did not start until the late 1990s. The most recent part of West Ox Road to be widened was opened in 2008.

== Major intersections ==
County	Location	mi	km	Destinations	Notes
City of Fairfax		0.00	0.00	SR 286 (Fairfax County Parkway) / US 29 (Lee Highway) – Springfield, Reston	Southern terminus; interchange
City of Fairfax		0.97	1.56	SR 7700 (Fair Lakes Parkway) – Fair Lakes, Fairfax	
City of Fairfax		1.72	2.77	US 50 (Lee Jackson Memorial Highway) – Fairfax, Winchester	Interchange
City of Fairfax		2.64	4.25	SR 664 (Waples Mill Road) – Oakton	
Fairfax	Herndon	4.92	7.92	SR 602 (Lawyers Road) – Reston, Oakton	
Fairfax	Herndon	6.15	9.90	SR 286 (Fairfax County Parkway) – Reston, Herndon, Fairfax, Springfield	
Fairfax	Herndon	6.50	10.46	SR 668 (McLearen Road) – Herndon	
Fairfax	Herndon	7.05	11.35	SR 666 (Monroe Street) – Herndon	
Fairfax	Herndon	7.61	12.25	SR 657 (Centreville Road) – Herndon, Chantilly	
Fairfax	Herndon	7.90	12.71	SR 7605 (Copper Ridge Road) – Herndon	
Fairfax	Herndon	Gap in route			
Fairfax	Herndon	7.90	12.71	SR 657 (Centreville Road) – Herndon, Chantilly	
Fairfax	Herndon–Chantilly line	8.90	14.32	SR 28 (Sully Road) – Sterling, Chantilly, Centreville, Manassas	Northern terminus
1.000 mi = 1.609 km; 1.000 km = 0.621 mi
