= Fairfax County Parkway =

Primary state highway in Fairfax County, Virginia

State Route 286
- Fairfax County Parkway

Route information
- Maintained by VDOT
- Length: 35 mi (56 km)

Major junctions
- South end: US 1 at Fort Belvoir
- I-95 in Newington; SR 123 near Fairfax Station; US 29 near Fairfax; I-66 near Fair Lakes; US 50 near Fairfax; SR 267 Toll in Reston
- North end: SR 7 in Dranesville

Location
- Country: United States
- State: Virginia

Highway system
- Virginia Routes; Interstate; US; Primary; Secondary; Byways; History; HOT lanes
← SR 285	SR 286	→ SR 287

The Fairfax County Parkway, numbered State Route 286 (SR 286, formerly SR 7100), is a primary state highway in the U.S. state of Virginia, acting as an expressway in Fairfax County with a mix of interchanges and signalized and unsignalized intersections. Its alignment runs from southeast to northwest and roughly corresponds to part of the once-proposed Outer Beltway around Washington, D.C. The first segment of the roadway opened in 1987; the road was completed in 2010.

SR 286 is also known as the John F. (Jack) Herrity Parkway, designated by the Virginia General Assembly in 1995, and the Trooper Charles Mark Cosslett Memorial Highway, designated in 2010 as the final link through Fort Belvoir. Jack Herrity served for 12 years on the Fairfax County Board of Supervisors, and was instrumental in getting the road built. This name is ceremonial, and is rarely used by the public.

== Route description ==
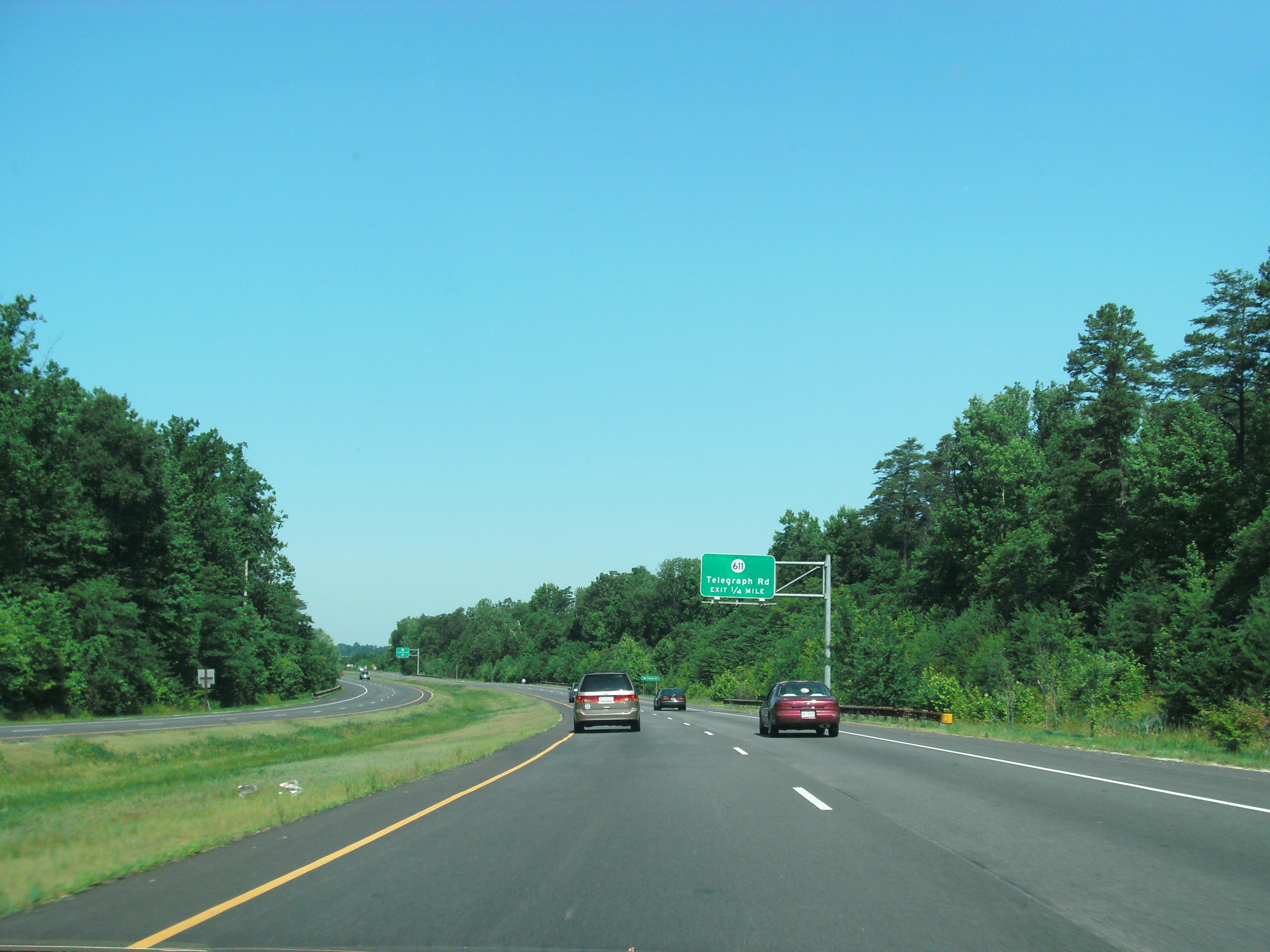
The Parkway near its southern end, on Fort Belvoir property

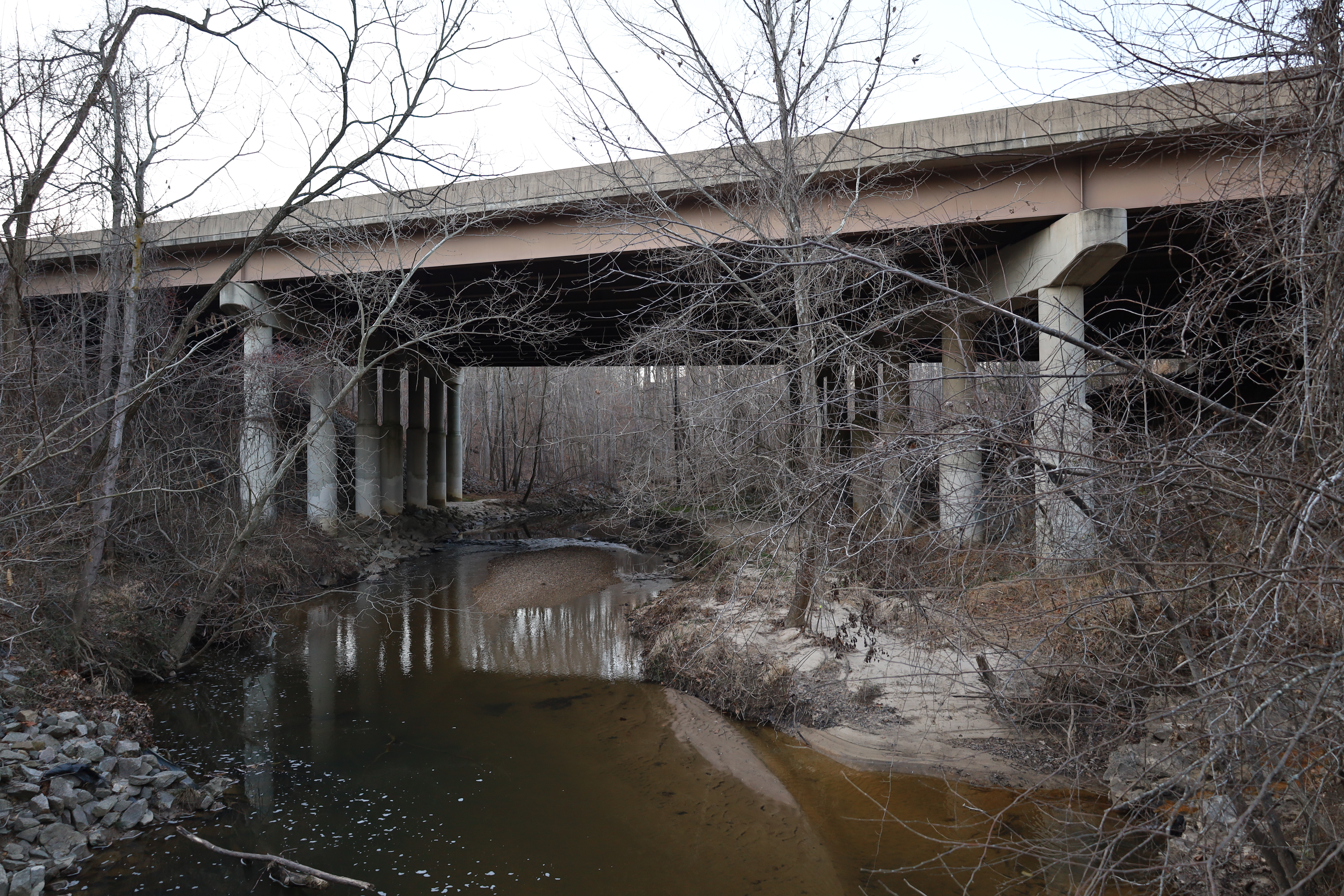
Fairfax County Parkway crossing Pohick Creek

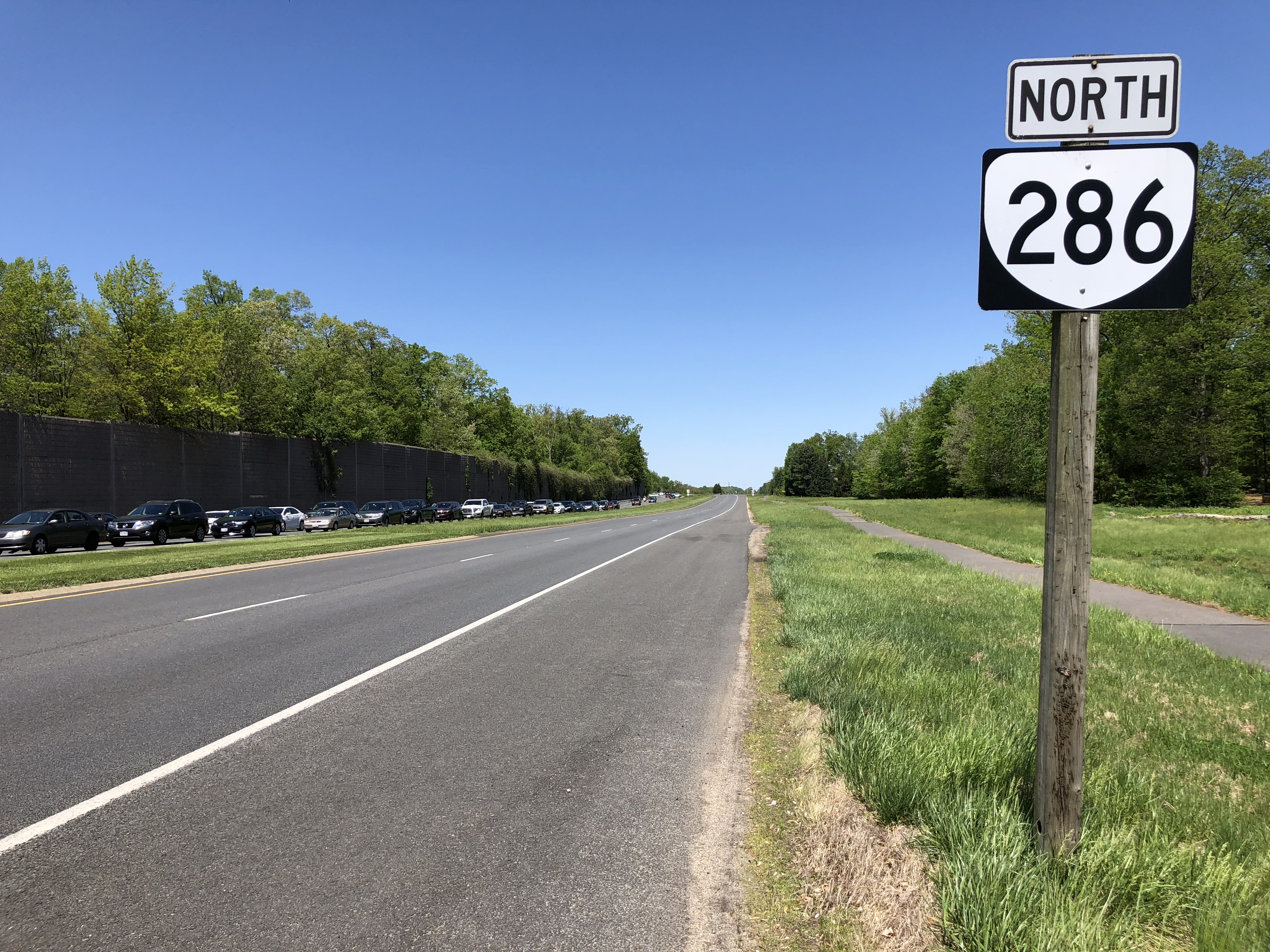
View north along SR 286 just north of Franklin Farm Road in Franklin Farm

The Fairfax County Parkway and its branch to Franconia generally have interchanges at major roads, traffic signals at intermediate roads, and right-in/right-out (RIRO) intersections with minor roads and neighborhood streets. Along the main parkway (SR 286), there are 17 full or partial interchanges and 39 signals, with eleven of those signals at interchanges. In addition, there are many unsignalized intersections along the road, but none of these are driveways, since the road is limited-access. The road generally has a speed limit of 50 mph (80 km/h).

The south end of SR 286 begins at an intersection with US 1 at Accotink and heads northwest through Fort Belvoir, leaving the fort at a diamond interchange with Telegraph Road (SR 611), crossing I-95 at a full cloverleaf (exit 166), crossing over Fullerton Road, passing through interchanges with Boudinot Drive and Barta Road, and turning west through West Springfield at Rolling Road. This portion replaced the existing Backlick Road (SR 617), which continues north from the I-95 interchange and connects to the Franconia–Springfield Parkway (SR 289). During most of the parkway's life, the portion between Fullerton Road and SR 289 had not been constructed due to delay caused by environmental issues, including an oil spill along its path through the Fort Belvoir Proving Ground. Since approval in 2008, construction began in 2009 and the new portion was opened in late 2010.

After merging with the Spur, there is in interchange with Hooes and Pohick Roads (SR 636/SR 641). Continuing northwest to the interchange with Ox Road (SR 123), SR 286 is a surface road, built directly on the former Pohick Road. The parkway beyond Ox Road was built on a new alignment, and has a much smaller number of intersections. Just past Ox Road, SR 286 passes under Clara Barton Drive, a minor residential street. It intersects the west end of Burke Center Parkway (SR 643), crosses over the Virginia Railway Express Manassas Line and Fairfax Station Road (SR 660), and intersects several other roads before a freeway section begins at a roundabout interchange with Popes Head Rd (SR 654). A complicated three-level diamond takes SR 286 over Lee Highway (US 29) at the south end of West Ox Road (SR 608), and SR 286 crosses I-66 at exit 55, a cloverleaf. After passing over Fair Lakes Circle (SR 7701), there is a diamond interchange with Fair Lakes Parkway (SR 7700) and Monument Drive (SR 7969). The next interchange, at Lee Jackson Memorial Highway (US 50), is a partial cloverleaf with two signals on SR 286.

From US 50 to Franklin Farm Road, the parkway curves northwest to reach the Outer Beltway right-of-way. This straight path is followed until Baron Cameron Avenue (SR 606), and includes an overpass at Pinecrest Road in the Fox Mill Estates neighborhood. After crossing the Dulles Access Road (SR 267), SR 286 follows the east border of Herndon, with interchanges at Sunset Hills Road (SR 675) and Baron Cameron Avenue (SR 606). The parkway leaves the straight Outer Beltway alignment just beyond Baron Cameron Avenue, curving northwest and north to end at a diamond interchange with Leesburg Pike (SR 7), at which the traffic signals are on SR 286. Algonkian Parkway continues north as a four-lane local road, eventually curving back west and south to SR 7 just east of SR 28.

=== Fairfax County Parkway Trail ===
The Fairfax County Parkway Trail is a multi-use trail that runs alongside the Franconia–Springfield Parkway and Fairfax County Parkway from Beulah Street in Springfield to SR 7, mostly as a sidepath, but sometimes using adjacent frontage roads and old alignments of the roads that the parkway replaced. It intersects the Washington and Old Dominion Trail north of Sunset Hills Road at Herndon, near that trail's mile 19. The final section of the trail was opened in 2002.

== History ==
=== Planning ===
The Outer Beltway was first planned in 1950 as the "Cross Country Loop", part of the National Capital Planning Commission's comprehensive plan. In Virginia, by the time of a 1965 plan, it was to run through southern and western Fairfax County, crossing the Potomac River at Mason Neck and north of Great Falls, and passing generally west of State Route 123 (Ox Road) and east of SR 645 (Clifton Road, Stringfellow Road, and Lees Corner Road). The straight part of the Fairfax County Parkway between south of Franklin Farm Road and north of Baron Cameron Avenue is built where the beltway would have been. During the 1970s, attention was focused on the Metrorail system, and environmental concerns temporarily pushed the Outer Beltway onto the back burner. In the 1980s and 1990s, when the plan was revived as the Western Transportation Corridor, the route was shifted further west.

The idea for the Springfield Bypass started in the 1970s as a bypass of SR 644 (Old Keene Mill Road) in Springfield. It was soon expanded, by 1978, to include most of what had been planned as the Outer Beltway. The Commonwealth Transportation Board approved final plans on July 16, 1987 for the 33-mile (53 km) road, with 16 interchanges and 35 traffic signals between U.S. Route 1 at Fort Belvoir and State Route 7 near Dranesville. A spur to Franconia was included, providing access to the Shirley Highway HOV lanes and the Franconia–Springfield Metrorail station. Except for a short six-lane piece in Reston, the $242 million plan included only four lanes. Since it was a surface road, the highway could incorporate existing roads. This included portions of SR 617 (Backlick Road), SR 636 (Hooes Road), SR 641 (Pohick Road), and SR 680 (Stuart Road).

Fifty-five homes and five businesses had to be taken by eminent domain to build the road. Included in these 55 homes were five at the brand-new Innisfree subdivision in Springfield. Only months after families moved into the houses, located between SR 636 (Hooes Road) and the proposed highway, they were informed that their land would be needed for the interchange at SR 640 (Sydenstricker Road). Originally planned as an at-grade intersection, projections of increased traffic led to a redesign that required more right-of-way.

The Fairfax County Board of Supervisors changed the name to the Fairfax County Parkway on June 23, 1988, noting that it traveled far from Springfield.

=== Construction ===
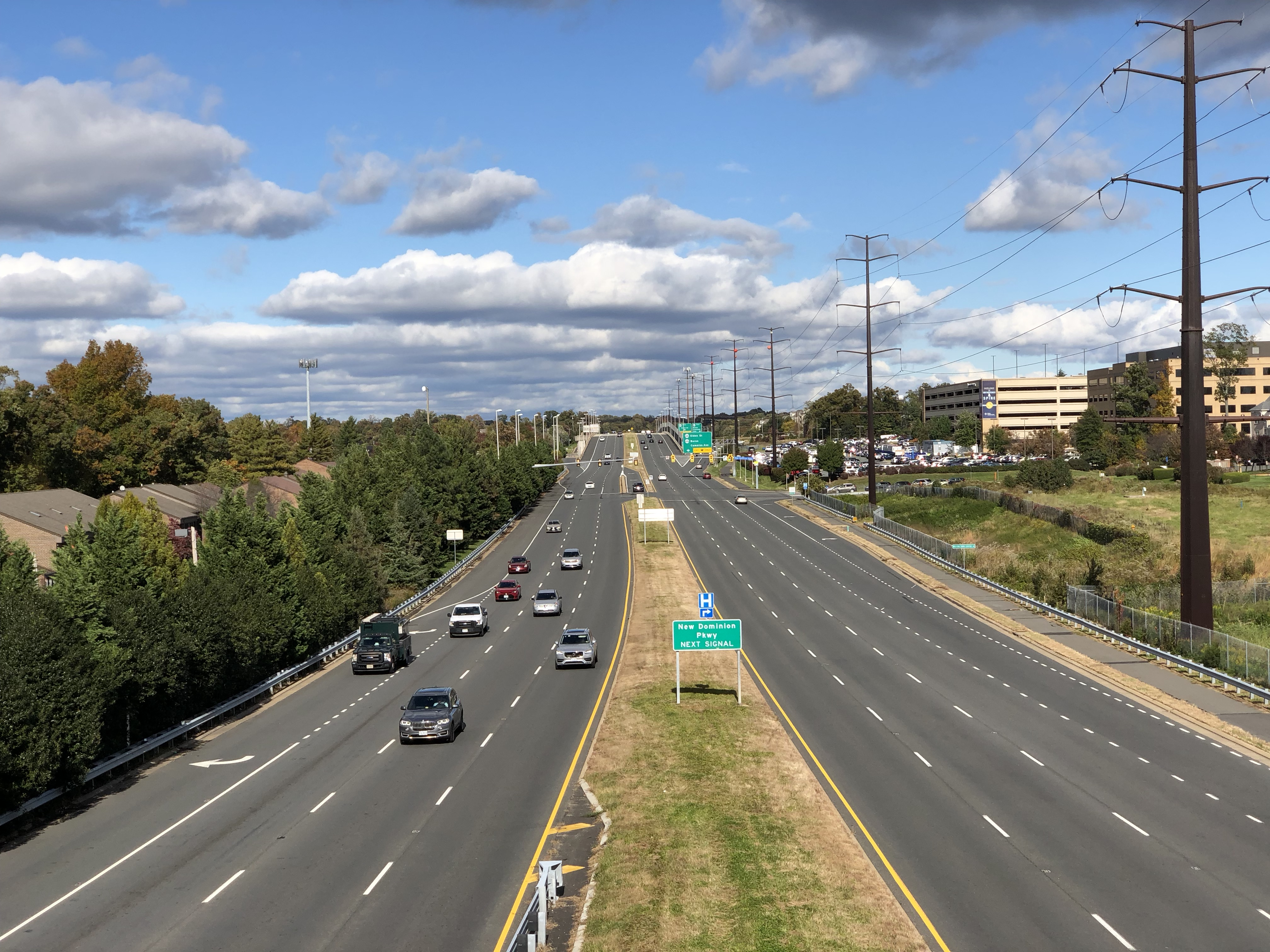
SR 286 in Reston

I-66 to Herndon (1987–1993)

Three bond issues were approved by Fairfax County voters to pay for construction of the highway, as well as other roads in the county: $135 million in November 1985, $150 million in April 1988, and $130 million in November 1992. The first portions of the road to open were financed by developers building in the area: Hazel/Peterson Companies from a new interchange on Interstate 66 north to U.S. Route 50, and Cavalier Land Development Corporation from Stringfellow Road north to Franklin Farm Road, both completed in 1987. On October 24, 1989, the gap from US 50 to Stringfellow Road was filled, and the road was extended from Franklin Farm Road north to West Ox Road (SR 608). It was further extended north to a new interchange on the Dulles Toll Road (SR 267) on October 22, 1991, and north to Sunset Hills Road (SR 675) on July 7, 1993.

Springfield to I-66 (1993–1996)

The next pieces of the road to open were in the southwest, with an upgrade and bypass of Hooes Road (SR 636) from Pohick Road (SR 641) east to Rolling Road (SR 638) and the Franconia–Springfield Parkway opening by November 1993. The highway from Ox Road (SR 123) north to Braddock Road (SR 620) opened on July 28, 1995, and was connected to the existing portion at I-66 on September 19. Two interchanges along this portion and the older one to the north – at US 50 and at US 29 – opened on December 14 and December 20 respectively. From SR 123 southeast to the beginning of the Franconia–Springfield Parkway, existing two-lane roads were widened, opening the road from SR 123 east to Lee Chapel Road (SR 643) by May 1996 and to Pohick Road (SR 641) on July 2, 1996, completing the road from Springfield to Herndon. However, until a new bridge opened in early September 2002, traffic on Pohick Road northbound (just east of Hooes Road) was required to turn right onto the parkway.

US 1 to I-95 (1997) and Herndon to SR 7 (1999–2001)

The southernmost portion, from US 1 north across I-95 to Fullerton Road, mostly an upgrade of Backlick Road (SR 617), opened south of Telegraph Road (SR 611) by July 1997 and north of Telegraph Road later that year. The first part north of Sunset Hills Road (SR 675), a short piece from the new interchange with SR 7 south to Sugarland Road (SR 604), opened by June 1999. The parkway was extended south from Sugarland Road to Wiehle Avenue (SR 828) on November 1, 2000. The road was extended to Walnut Branch with two lanes extended to Baron Cameron Avenue (SR 606) on December 21, 2000. The gap between Walnut Branch and Sunset Hills was filled on November 5, 2001, finally completing the parkway north of Springfield.

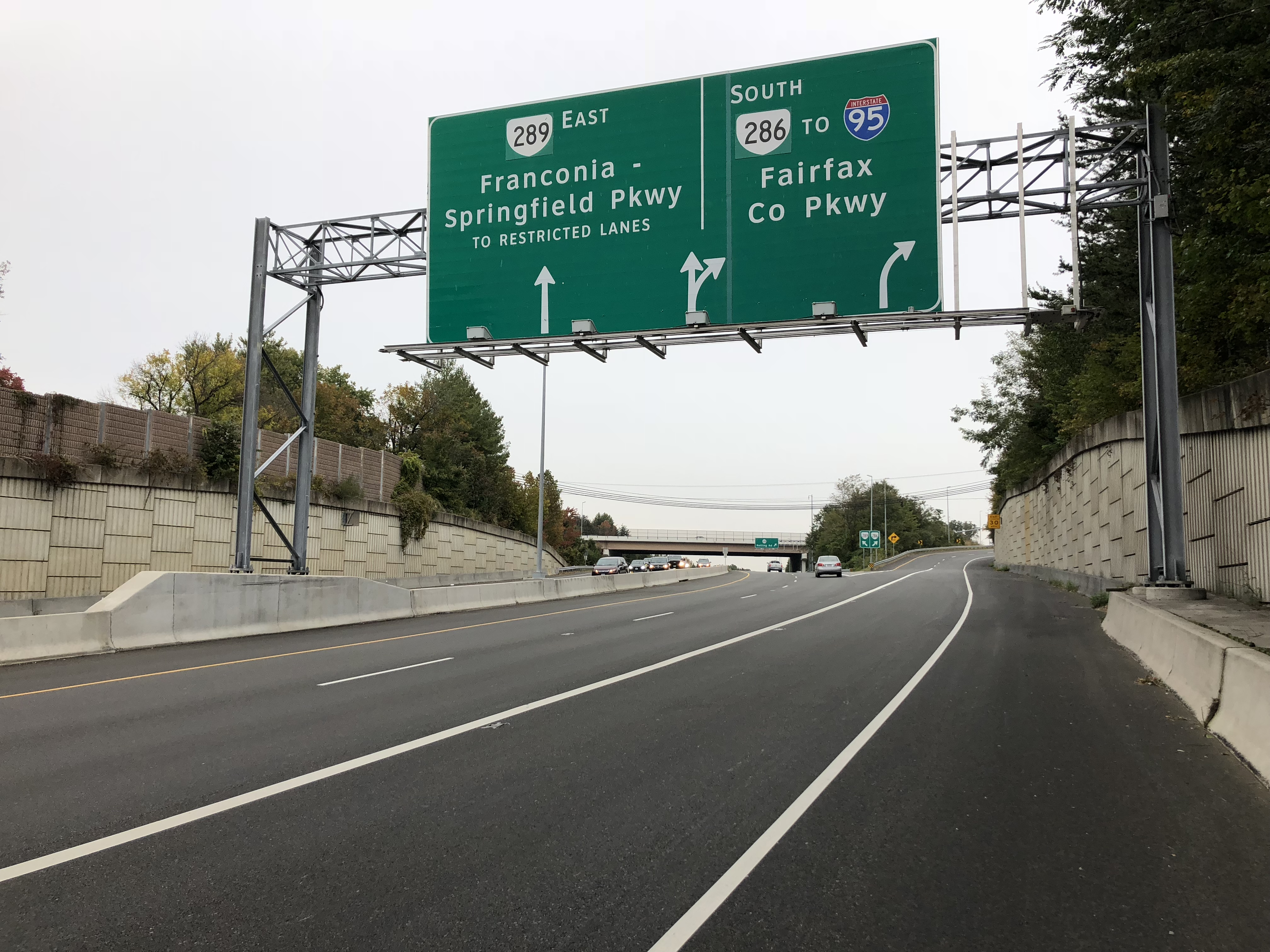
SR 286 southbound at SR 289 in Newington

I-95 to Springfield (2009–2012)

Construction has been delayed many times on the last segment, between Fullerton Road (just north of I-95) and Rolling Road (SR 638), which will allow traffic on the main part of the parkway to connect directly to the I-95 main lanes. Plans were made here in the late 1980s, and it was to be paid for by a developer who was to build a development on land bought from the U.S. Army's Fort Belvoir. But those plans fell through, and traffic growth necessitated a redesign. Plans were again postponed in the early 2000s due to necessary environmental cleanup of that part of Fort Belvoir, which included unexploded ordnance. The Environmental Protection Agency discovered in 2005 that an oil spill on the property had not been properly cleaned. As of 2007, the project had been designed as a full freeway but was placed on hold. As of September 2010, this portion of the parkway opened for traffic, closing the gap that once existed.

=== Designation as primary state highway ===
On February 16, 2012, the Fairfax County Parkway was designated SR 286. In June 2012, signage was updated to reflect the new designation with a mix of SR 286 and "old SR 7100" signs and reassurance markers.

== Major intersections ==
The entire parkway is in Fairfax County.

Location	mi	km	Destinations	Notes
Fort Belvoir	0.0	0.0	US 1 (Richmond Highway)	Southern terminus
Newington	1.8	2.9	SR 611 (Telegraph Road)	Interchange
Newington	2.8	4.5	SR 789 (Loisdale Road)	
Newington	3.0	4.8	I-95 / I-95 Express – Richmond, Washington	Interchange; I-95 exit 166
Newington	3.1	5.0	SR 617 (Backlick Road)	Interchange; northbound exit only
			Boudinot Drive (SR 4502)	Interchange
			To Barta Road south (Rolling Road) / SR 638	Interchange
West Springfield	5.1	8.2	SR 289 east (Franconia–Springfield Parkway) / SR 638 (Rolling Road) / to Restricted Lanes	Interchange with a signal on SR 286 northbound
West Springfield	6.0– 6.2	9.7– 10.0	SR 640 (Gambrill Road / Sydenstricker Road)	Interchange
West Springfield	7.1– 7.3	11.4– 11.7	SR 636 south (Hooes Road) / Pohick Road (SR 641)	Interchange
Burke	8.9	14.3	SR 643 (Lee Chapel Road)	
Burke	10.0	16.1	SR 644 (Old Keene Mill Road)	
Burke	10.7	17.2	SR 645 (Burke Lake Road) – Burke Lake Park	
Burke	13.2	21.2	SR 123 (Ox Road)	Interchange
Burke	13.9	22.4	SR 643 (Burke Centre Parkway)	
Fairfax Station	16.4	26.4	SR 654 (Popes Head Road)	Interchange
Fairfax Station	17.1	27.5	SR 620 (Braddock Road)	Interchange
	18.2	29.3	US 29 (Lee Highway) / SR 608 (West Ox Road)	Interchange
	19.3	31.1	I-66 – Front Royal, Washington	Interchange; I-66 exit 55
	20.0	32.2	SR 7700 (Fair Lakes Parkway) / SR 7969 (Monument Drive)	Interchange
	21.0	33.8	US 50 (Lee Jackson Memorial Highway)	Interchange with signals on SR 286
	21.5	34.6	SR 750 (Rugby Road)	
	24.8	39.9	SR 608 (West Ox Road)	
Reston	26.4	42.5	SR 665 (Fox Mill Road)	
Reston	27.5	44.3	SR 267 Toll – Dulles Airport (no toll via Dulles Access Road), Washington	Interchange with signals on SR 286; SR 267 exit 11
Reston	27.8	44.7	Sunset Hills Road / Spring Street (SR 675)	Interchange with a signal on SR 286
Reston	28.5	45.9	SR 606 (Elden Street / Baron Cameron Avenue)	Interchange with signals on SR 606
Reston	30.5	49.1	SR 828 (Wiehle Avenue)	
Reston	31.4	50.5	SR 604 (Sugarland Road)	
Dranesville	31.8	51.2	SR 7 (Leesburg Pike) / Algonkian Parkway (SR 6220 north)	Northern terminus; interchange with signals on SR 286
1.000 mi = 1.609 km; 1.000 km = 0.621 mi: Incomplete access

== See also ==
- Intercounty Connector, a toll road in Montgomery and Prince George's Counties Maryland on some of the Outer Beltway right-of-way
- Montrose Parkway, a surface road built in Montgomery County, Maryland on some of the Outer Beltway right-of-way, where the Intercounty Connector's path is further north
