= Washington Outer Beltway =

Proposed highway around Washington, D.C.

The Washington Outer Beltway was a proposed freeway that would have extended further out than the Capital Beltway and encircled Washington, D.C. through the states of Maryland and Virginia. Most of the route was canceled in the 1980s. Parts of it have been built as the Fairfax County Parkway in Virginia, as well as Interstate 370 and the Intercounty Connector in Maryland.

== History ==
Initial plans were developed in the 1950s for the proposed 122-mile (196 km) Washington Outer Beltway. The National Capital Park and Planning Commission issued a Comprehensive Plan for the Nation's Capital and Its Environs in 1950. The comprehensive plan included three different circular roads in and around the District of Columbia. The original Outer Beltway had been planned to pass south of the corporate limits of the City of Rockville, as shown on a map published in The Washington Post in 1951 with the caption "Ring Road suggested by Bureau of Public Roads". In 1953, the portion of the Outer Beltway between Montgomery County and Prince George's County was included in the Master Plan of Highways of the Maryland-National Capital Park and Planning Commission. It was later included in the commission's General Plan in 1957, and the commission's On Wedges and Corridors plan in 1964.

In the 1960s, an "outer circumferential highway" was proposed between 5 and 10 miles (8.0 and 16.1 km) outside the Capital Beltway. In Virginia, by the time of a 1965 plan, it was to run through southern and western Fairfax County, crossing the Potomac River at Mason Neck and north of Great Falls, and passing generally west of State Route 123 (Ox Road) and east of SR 645 (Clifton Road, Stringfellow Road, and Lees Corner Road). The straight part of the current Fairfax County Parkway between south of Franklin Farm Road and north of Baron Cameron Avenue is built where the beltway would have been. By contrast, a 1964 plan proposed by a consultant for Prince William County showed a 162-mile (261 km) freeway passing by Quantico, Manassas, Leesburg, Poolesville, upper Montgomery County, Fort Meade, southeastern Prince George's County, and La Plata.

The original proposed routing in Maryland was south and east of the current Intercounty Connector alignment. The new route was motivated in part by a desire to move the routing of the proposed bridge over the Potomac River upstream from the area of River Bend to Watkins Island. Virginia residents and the United States Department of the Interior objected to the proposed bridge over the Potomac River because they wanted to create state and federal parks along the river in order to protect sugar maple trees, vegetation, and bald eagles. Because of these concerns, the Maryland State Roads Commission moved the proposed Outer Beltway to a route north of Rockville and eliminated a new bridge crossing the Potomac River.

The Montgomery County Planning Board accepted the state's newly proposed route in 1970, but the Montgomery County Council rejected it, and Prince George's County and Virginia dropped it from their plans. During the 1970s, attention was focused on the Metrorail system, and environmental concerns temporarily pushed the Outer Beltway onto the back burner. In the 1980s and 1990s, when the plan was revived as the Western Transportation Corridor in Virginia, the route was shifted further west.

In 1975, the National Capital Region Transportation Planning Board of the Metropolitan Washington Council of Governments endorsed a request from the State Highway Administration "for federal support of a $1.1 million planning and engineering study of the first 8-mile [13 km] segment of the road" (then called the Outer Beltway), which was to "run from the Baltimore-Washington Parkway near Beltsville westward to a point near Interstate Rte 70S at Gaithersburg." By 1976, Maryland's Secretary of Transportation no longer supported state financial support of the Outer Beltway, although Montgomery County still supported it in concept. In 1980, the state of Maryland dropped the Washington Outer Beltway from its plans except for the Intercounty Connector.

== Techway proposal ==
The Techway is a proposal for a limited-access highway across the Potomac River between Fairfax County, Virginia, and Montgomery County, Maryland. The project's name refers to connecting the high-tech firms in Herndon and Reston, Virginia, with the biotechnology companies in Gaithersburg and Rockville, Maryland. The Techway proposal would construct a limited-access highway and bridge linking Virginia State Route 28 north of Washington Dulles International Airport to the western terminus of I-370 in Gaithersburg, Maryland. To avoid criticism that such a project would encourage urban sprawl, the proponents advocated having very few interchanges on the route and emphasizing its use in making Dulles Airport and the associated office buildings in its vicinity more convenient to residents of northern Montgomery County that currently use the American Legion Memorial Bridge.

In 2000, Congress authorized $2,000,000 to conduct a feasibility study of the Techway. Congressman Frank Wolf, one of the primary sponsors of the study, asked that the study be canceled the next year because homes in his Congressional district would have to be destroyed in order to build the Techway. U.S. Transportation Secretary Norman Mineta agreed to cancel the study, saying it would be a waste of money to continue studying a bridge that would never be built. Virginia Governor James S. Gilmore III asked Mineta to reconsider, but the study was cancelled.

In 2004, a Virginia Department of Transportation traffic study of the American Legion Bridge showed that a significant portion of bridge users traveled between points west of that bridge, reviving the Techway concept. In addition, the Techway project was also discussed in connection with Maryland Route 200 that will extend I-370 to the east to US 1. The combination of the Techway and this other extension would go a long way to form a Western Bypass of Washington, D.C. for north–south traffic on I-95. Also in 2004, the Montgomery County Council unanimously passed a resolution opposing any bridge, citing concerns about destruction of existing neighborhoods, damage to parkland along the Potomac River, the need to protect the county's 90,000-acre (360 km^{2}) Agricultural Reserve, and its conflicting with the master plan for Potomac.

As of 2011, the Techway project is not funded and not under active study.

== See also ==
- Intercounty Connector
