= West Springfield, Virginia =

- Census-designated place
- Location of West Springfield in Fairfax County, Virginia

- Location within Northern Virginia Location within Virginia Location within the United States
- Coordinates: 38°47′18″N 77°13′58″W
- Country: United States
- State: Virginia
- County: Fairfax

Area
  - Total: 4.83 sq mi (12.50 km^{2})
  - Land: 4.80 sq mi (12.42 km^{2})
  - Water: 0.031 sq mi (0.08 km^{2})
- Elevation: 272 ft (83 m)

Population (2020)
  - Total: 23,396
  - Density: 4,847/sq mi (1,871.6/km^{2})
- Time zone: UTC−5 (Eastern (EST))
  - Summer (DST): UTC−4 (EDT)
- ZIP code: 22152
- Area codes: 703, 571
- FIPS code: 51-84976
- GNIS feature ID: 1493775

West Springfield is a census-designated place (CDP) in Fairfax County, Virginia, United States. The population was 23,369 at the 2020 census.

== Geography ==
West Springfield is located in central Fairfax County at 38°47′18″N 77°13′58″W (38.788436, −77.232802). Its borders are the Norfolk Southern Railway Washington District to the north, Accotink Creek to the east, Fort Belvoir and the Fairfax County Parkway to the south, and Pohick Creek and a power line to the west.

According to the U.S. Census Bureau, the total area of the West Springfield CDP is 4.81 square miles (12.45 km^{2}), of which 0.03 square miles (0.08 km^{2}), or 0.65%, is water.

== Demographics ==
Historical population
Census	Pop.	Note	%±
1970	14,143		—
1980	25,012		76.9%
1990	28,126		12.5%
2000	28,378		0.9%
2010	22,460		−20.9%
2020	23,369		4.0%

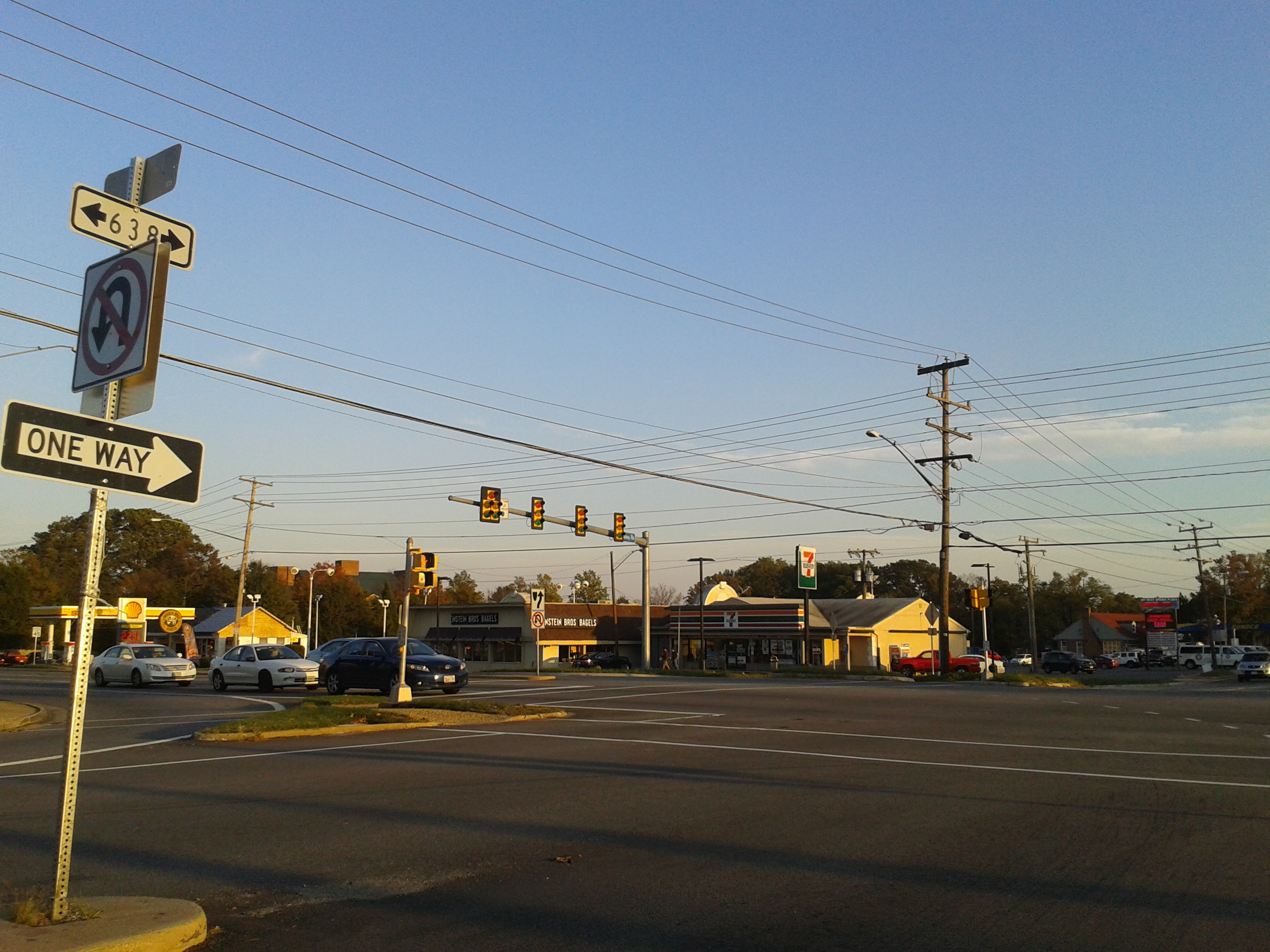
Intersection of Old Keene Mill Rd. and Rolling Rd. in West Springfield

=== Racial and ethnic composition ===
West Springfield CDP, Virginia – Racial and ethnic composition Note: the US Census treats Hispanic/Latino as an ethnic category. This table excludes Latinos from the racial categories and assigns them to a separate category. Hispanics/Latinos may be of any race.
Race / Ethnicity (NH = Non-Hispanic)	Pop 2000	Pop 2010	Pop 2020	% 2000	% 2010	% 2020
White alone (NH)	20,151	13,499	11,864	71.01%	60.10%	50.77%
Black or African American alone (NH)	1,369	1,690	2,218	4.82%	7.52%	9.49%
Native American or Alaska Native alone (NH)	60	36	46	0.21%	0.16%	0.20%
Asian alone (NH)	3,924	3,486	4,002	13.83%	15.52%	17.13%
Native Hawaiian or Pacific Islander alone (NH)	17	32	17	0.06%	0.14%	0.07%
Other race alone (NH)	66	57	168	0.23%	0.25%	0.72%
Mixed race or Multiracial (NH)	710	693	1,419	2.50%	3.09%	6.07%
Hispanic or Latino (any race)	2,081	2,967	3,635	7.33%	13.21%	15.55%
Total	28,378	22,460	23,369	100.00%	100.00%	100.00%

=== 2020 census ===
As of the 2020 census, West Springfield had a population of 23,369. The median age was 40.3 years. 24.7% of residents were under the age of 18 and 15.0% of residents were 65 years of age or older. For every 100 females there were 94.0 males, and for every 100 females age 18 and over there were 90.4 males age 18 and over.

100.0% of residents lived in urban areas, while 0.0% lived in rural areas.

There were 8,191 households in West Springfield, of which 38.7% had children under the age of 18 living in them. Of all households, 59.9% were married-couple households, 12.5% were households with a male householder and no spouse or partner present, and 24.2% were households with a female householder and no spouse or partner present. About 20.5% of all households were made up of individuals and 8.9% had someone living alone who was 65 years of age or older.

There were 8,387 housing units, of which 2.3% were vacant. The homeowner vacancy rate was 0.6% and the rental vacancy rate was 3.0%.

Racial composition as of the 2020 census
Race	Number	Percent
White	12,438	53.2%
Black or African American	2,284	9.8%
American Indian and Alaska Native	97	0.4%
Asian	4,033	17.3%
Native Hawaiian and Other Pacific Islander	17	0.1%
Some other race	1,295	5.5%
Two or more races	3,205	13.7%
Hispanic or Latino (of any race)	3,635	15.6%

=== 2010 census ===
At the 2010 census there were 22,460 people, 10,289 households, and 7,840 families in the CDP. The population density was 4,158.7 inhabitants per square mile (1,605.7/km^{2}). There were 10,425 housing units at an average density of 1,527.7 per square mile (589.8/km^{2}). The racial makeup of the CDP was 75.31% White, 4.89% African American, 0.28% Native American, 13.91% Asian, 0.06% Pacific Islander, 2.55% from other races, and 3.01% from two or more races. Hispanic or Latino of any race were 7.33%.

Of the 10,289 households 36.8% had children under the age of 18 living with them, 64.4% were married couples living together, 8.9% had a female householder with no husband present, and 23.8% were non-families. 18.8% of households were one person and 4.5% were one person aged 65 or older. The average household size was 2.76 and the average family size was 3.16.

The age distribution was 25.6% under the age of 18, 6.2% from 18 to 24, 29.3% from 25 to 44, 28.9% from 45 to 64, and 9.9% 65 or older. The median age was 39 years. For every 100 females, there were 95.3 males. For every 100 females age 18 and over, there were 91.4 males.

According to a 2007 estimate, the median household income was $97,203, and the median family income was $106,667. Males had a median income of $61,953 versus $40,380 for females. The per capita income for the CDP was $35,375. About 1.7% of families and 2.4% of the population were below the poverty line, including 2.6% of those under age 18 and 0.5% of those age 65 or over.

== Education ==
Fairfax County Public Schools operates public schools.

- Cardinal Forest Elementary School
- Keene Mill Elementary School
- Rolling Valley Elementary School
- West Springfield Elementary School
- Irving Middle School
- West Springfield High School

Kings Park Elementary School was defined as being in the West Springfield CDP in the 1990 U.S. census and the 2000 U.S. census, but as of the 2010 U.S. census it was defined as being in the Kings Park CDP. It has a Springfield postal address.

St. Bernadette Catholic School of the Roman Catholic Diocese of Arlington is in the West Springfield CDP; it has a Springfield postal address. Holy Spirit School, of the same diocese, has been defined as being in Wakefield CDP since 2010 but was previously in West Springfield CDP. It has an Annandale postal address.
