= Virginia HOT lanes =

Six separate projects in the U.S. state of Virginia

Highway names
- Interstates: Interstate X (I-X)
- US Highways: U.S. Route X (US X)
- State: State Route X (SR X) or Virginia Route X (VA X)

System links
- Virginia Routes; Interstate; US; Primary; Secondary; Byways; History; HOT lanes

Virginia HOT lanes refers to seven separate projects to add high-occupancy toll lane to highways in the U.S. state of Virginia.

== Projects ==
The seven projects of Virginia HOT lanes include:

- The first project, completed in November 2012, added high-occupancy/toll (HO/T) lanes (Note: The form "HOT lanes" stands for "high-occupancy toll lanes" and is common in the media; accordingly, it is the name of this article to facilitate searches. However, because the lanes in question offer users the choice of satisfying an HOV restriction or else paying a toll, the more accurate name is "high-occupancy or toll lanes", or "HO/T lanes" (the slash denoting the option). This article uses the latter convention in the text for accuracy.) to the Capital Beltway (I-495) in Fairfax County.
- The second project, opened to the public in December 2014, involved converting and extending the existing reversible high-occupancy vehicle (HOV) lanes on I-95 and a portion of I-395 to HO/T lanes from Stafford to near Alexandria.
- The third project converted all lanes on I-66 inside the Beltway to peak-direction HO/T lanes, opening on December 4, 2017.
- The fourth project reconstructed approximately 21 miles (34 km) of I-66 outside the Beltway, making it a 10-lane corridor with five lanes in each direction—three general-purpose and two HO/T lanes.
- The fifth project, which was completed in November 2019, essentially extended the aforementioned I-95/I-395 project several miles to the north, converting the existing reversible HOV lanes on I-395 to HO/T lanes from near Alexandria to Washington, D.C.
- The sixth project will convert the existing reversible HOV lanes to HO/T Lanes on Interstate 64 from Interstate 564 in Norfolk to Interstate 264 in Virginia Beach, and also propose to expand the I-64 express lanes before and after the HO/T Lanes.
- The seventh project, which is be completed by Spring 2024, extended I-95's HO/T lanes from VA 610 in Garrisonville to its northernmost interchange with US 17 and US 17 business in Falmouth.
- The eighth project, completed in November 2025, extended the Capital Beltway's (I-495) HO/T lanes two miles north from VA 267 in Tysons to the American Legion Memorial Bridge.

== 495 Express Lanes ==
495 Express Lanes
- Location: Springfield Interchange to George Washington Memorial Parkway
- Length: 16.5 mi (26.6 km)

=== South of Dulles Corridor ===
The 495 Express Lanes, also known as the E-ZPass Express Lanes, are a 14-mile (23 km) segment of I-495 extending from the Springfield Interchange to a point north of the Dulles Toll Road. The project began when Virginia Department of Transportation (VDOT) signed an agreement with Fluor Corporation and Transurban in April 2005 to create HO/T lanes between Springfield and Georgetown Pike. A contract was finalized on December 20, 2007, and construction began in the summer of 2008.

During construction, the existing eight-lane (four lanes per carriageway) Beltway was widened to a 12-lane facility consisting of four general-purpose lanes per side and two high-occupancy/toll express lanes per side located to the left of the general-purpose lanes. Construction required replacement of more than 50 overpasses and bridges and the reconstruction of ten interchanges. The project also added direct connections between the Capital Beltway and the I-95/I-395 HOV lanes. The project cost $1.4 billion and was controversial due to concerns over its cost-effectiveness and the environmental effects (such as surface runoff and use of parkland) of widening the Capital Beltway.

The lanes opened on November 17, 2012. Buses, motorcycles, and vehicles with three or more people are able to use the express lanes for free; other vehicles must pay a toll. The toll rates change dynamically according to traffic conditions, which in turn regulates demand for the lanes and keep them operating at high speeds. Tolls are collected solely via electronic means using E-ZPass transponders. No cash toll booths are offered. Motorcycles always travel for free and do not require a transponder. All other vehicles must have a transponder; in order to travel free, these vehicles need an E-ZPass Flex switchable transponder so the driver can indicate whether the vehicle qualifies for free passage. There are 11 entry/exit points to the lanes. State Police positioned at toll plazas are notified electronically if a vehicle is using the E-ZPass Flex in HOV mode. If the officer suspects the vehicle does not meet the occupancy requirement, they will stop the vehicle and verify. First time HOV violators in Northern Virginia face a minimum $125 fine, with the fine doubling (and 3 demerit points added to the driver's record) for each subsequent offense.

The speed limit on the lanes was increased from 55 mph to 65 mph on June 24, 2013, after a VDOT study concluded an increase would not pose a safety risk. Transportation officials said they always expected the speed limit to be increased, but they needed to open the lanes with a 55 mph speed limit to observe how the lanes operated and to assess whether the limit could be increased.

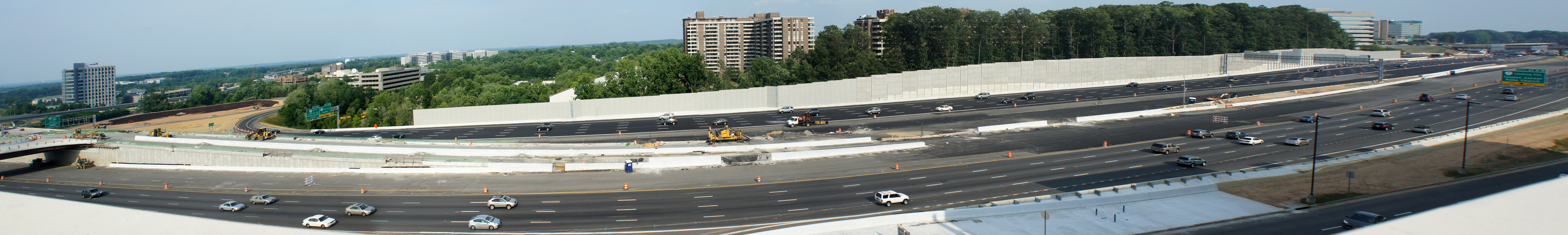
Interstate 495 (Capital Beltway) Express Lanes under construction. At the left is the I-495 interchange with Route 123 and the elevated ramp access to the HO/T lanes from Route 123 (Tysons Corner), in Fairfax County, Virginia, Virginia.

=== North of Dulles Corridor ===
In March 2022, VDOT and Transurban commenced on a two and a half mile northern extension of the I-495 HOT lanes from VA 267 to just south of the American Legion Memorial Bridge (4-4 to 4-2-2-4 configuration). A new flyover was constructed to connect VA 267 with the northbound HOT Lanes, and an exit and entry ramp were constructed to enable access from the HOT lanes to the George Washington Memorial Parkway. The collector distributor lane on southbound I 495 from the parkway to VA 193 (Georgetown Pike) were reconstructed, and the underpasses at VA 267 and Scott Run, and the overpasses at Lewinsville Road, Old Dominion Drive, VA 193, and the parkway were rebuilt as well. VA 193 will be widened within the vicinity of its interchange with the Beltway. The express lanes opened to the public on November 23, 2025, and the project itself is expected to be completed in 2026.

The express lanes are expected to extend into Maryland in the future

== 95 Express Lanes ==
95 Express Lanes
- Location: Fredericksburg, Virginia to Interstate 395
- Length: 36.8 mi (59.2 km)

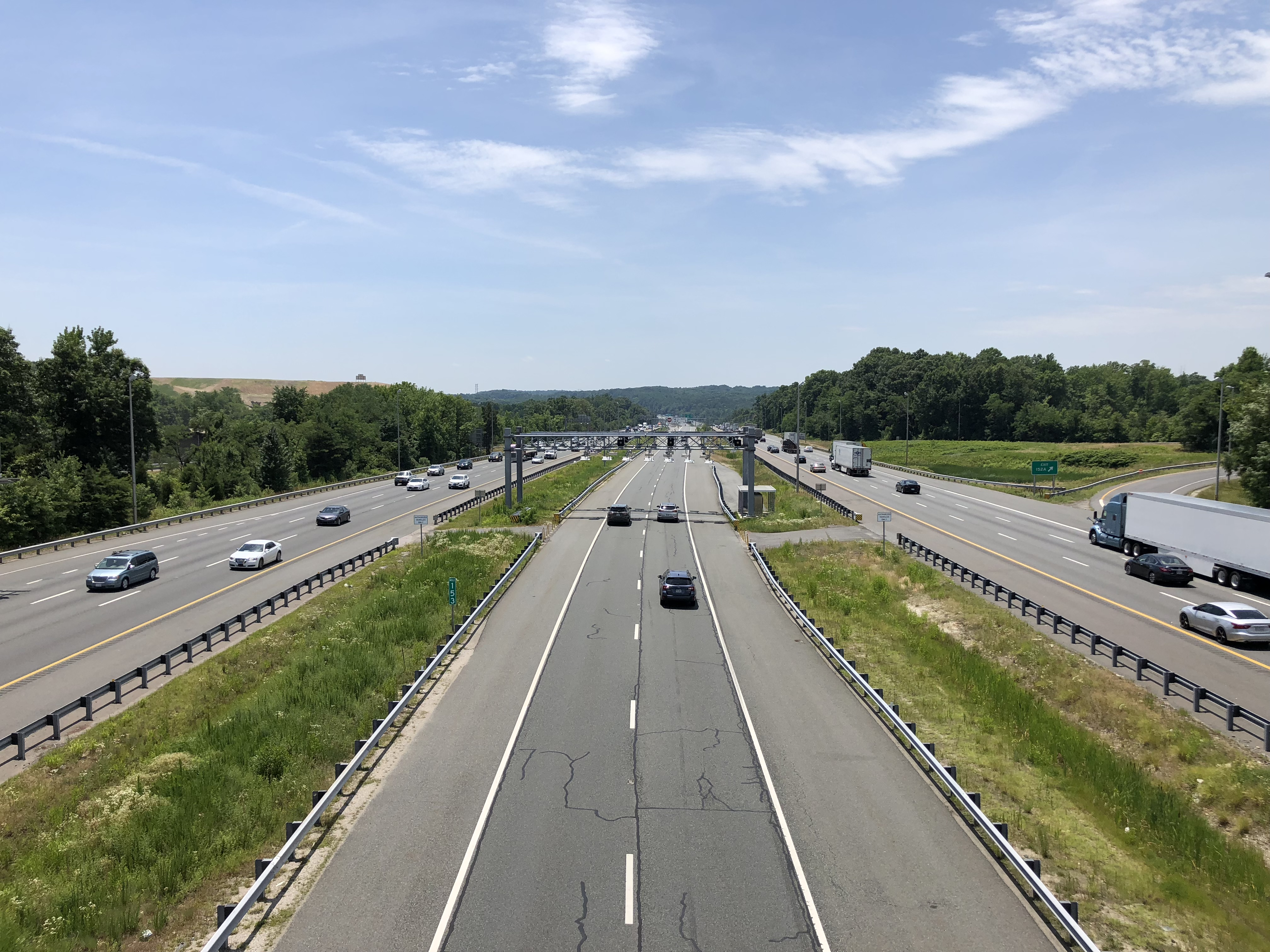
I-95 with reversible HO/T lanes in Northern Virginia

The 95 Express Lanes project is a separate public-private partnership to construct and operate HO/T lanes on a 29-mile (47 km) portion of the existing reversible HOV-3 facility on I-95 and I-395. The project included construction of a nine-mile (14 km) extension of the reversible lanes from their previous southern terminus near Virginia State Route 234 to Garrisonville Road (Route 610) in Stafford County. The project also added a third reversible lane within the carriageway's existing footprint from the Prince William Parkway (Virginia State Route 294) to the project's northern terminus between Duke Street (Virginia State Route 236) and Edsall Road, just south of the City of Alexandria limits; to the north of this point, the reversible facility continues to operate as it did prior to the high-occupancy/toll project. The 95 Express Lanes began HO/T operations on December 29, 2014. The project had opened two weeks earlier and operated under the older HOV rules until tolling began.

Road improvements included:

- Making improvements to the existing two HOV lanes for six miles (9.7 km) from Route 234 to the Prince William Parkway.
- Widening the existing reversible carriageway from two lanes to three lanes for 14 miles (23 km) from the Prince William Parkway to approximately two miles (3.2 km) north of the Springfield Interchange in the vicinity of Edsall Road.
- Adding new or improved access points in the areas of Garrisonville Road, Joplin Road, Prince William Parkway, Fairfax County Parkway (Virginia State Route 286), Franconia-Springfield Parkway (Virginia State Route 289), I-495, and in the vicinity of Edsall Road.
- VDOT advanced plans to construct a new ramp at I-395 and Seminary Road for the Mark Center, concurrent with (but separate from) the HO/T lanes project. The ramp opened to traffic in early 2016.
- VDOT also expanded park-and-ride lots and funded other local transit improvements to maximize the benefit of the new HO/T lanes network.
- VDOT advanced studies to support the ultimate extension of HO/T lanes on I-95 south of Route 610 into Spotsylvania County. The extension opened to traffic in late 2023.
- VDOT opened a new southbound ramp at VA 642 (Opitz Boulevard). The cost for the construction was $69.7 million.

The original proposal was for the lanes to extend the entire length of the then-existing HOV facility, reaching the District of Columbia. The plan faced opposition from Arlington County, which houses a 4.5-mile (7.2 km) stretch of I-395; the county filed a lawsuit demanding an environmental review of the proposal and contending the lanes would create congestion on streets traveling to and from I-395. In February 2011, VDOT said the lawsuit created a "detrimental" delay to the project, with Virginia Secretary of Transportation Sean Connaughton saying, "We can no longer wait to deliver congestion relief and new travel choices." VDOT announced a modified plan that ends the HO/T lanes at Edsall Road in Fairfax County, avoiding the City of Alexandria and Arlington County. As a result, the three-lane portion of the reversible carriageway, and the HO/T rules, ended just north of Edsall Road. North of that point, the reversible lanes continued to operate under the pre-existing rules imposing an HOV-3 restriction during peak hours, allowing all traffic at other times, and not requiring an E-ZPass. Drivers paying the HO/T lane tolls with fewer than three people in a vehicle were not permitted to use the reversible lanes all the way into Washington during the morning rush hour and instead had to exit the reversible lanes at a new ramp north of Edsall Road constructed as part of the HO/T project; similarly, during the afternoon rush hour toll-payers with fewer than three people in a vehicle were not permitted to enter the reversible lanes north of that same location. These restrictions changed in November 2019 when the HO/T system was extended north along I-395 to the Potomac River.

Since the original portion of the HOV facility opened in the 1970s, an informal car pool system called "slugging" has evolved around the reversible lanes. Drivers of cars with only one or two passengers stop at designated points and pick up strangers in order to meet the HOV-3 requirement. Members of the slugging community contended that if the HO/T lanes were extended all the way to Washington, passenger utilization of the reversible lanes might decline if drivers chose to pay HO/T tolls instead of picking up passengers from slug lines. The impact on the slug lines was not addressed by VDOT or its private sector vendors in the original proposal.

In November 2019, construction began to extend the I-95 HO/T lanes south from their original terminus at Exit 143, VA 610 near Aquia to Exit 133, US 17 near Fredericksburg. It also adds a collector distributor lane system from the express lanes southern terminus at the US 17 interchange to VA 3 in Fredericksburg, requiring the reconstruction of I-95's crossing at the Rappahannock River. The project also added three access points: one south of VA 610 in Garrisonville, one at Old Courthouse Road in Stafford, and one at US 17. express lanes are complete as of December 2023, and the rest of the project was completed in early December 2023.

As of Summer 2022, construction is underway to construct a new ramp from the HO/T lanes to VA 642 (Opitz Boulevard) near Woodbridge.

== 395 Express Lanes ==
395 Express Lanes
- Location: Interstate 95 to Washington, D.C.
- Length: 9.8 mi (15.8 km)

The 395 Express Lanes project extended the I-95/I-395 HO/T lanes approximately eight miles (13 km) to the north from the "Turkeycock" ramp complex north of Edsall Road to the District of Columbia line. As with the I-95 project discussed above, construction involved widening the two existing reversible lanes to a three-lane reversible roadway and making changes to the interchange closest to the Pentagon in order to reduce traffic backups. In addition, the approach to the inbound (towards DC) Rochambeau Bridge span at the 14th Street Bridge (widely known locally as the "HOV bridge"), which was previously open to all traffic without restriction, was added to the HO/T operations at all times in order to prevent general-purpose traffic from congesting the northern terminus of the express lanes. Traffic leaving the District of Columbia is not subject to the same restriction and may use the express roadway toll-free up to, and including, the Eads Street/Pentagon exit.

The I-395 HO/T lanes operate in the same manner as the I-95 lanes. The express lanes opened on November 17, 2019.

== 66 Express Lanes ==
66 Express Inside the Beltway
- Location: Interstate 495 in Tysons to US 29 in Rosslyn
- Length: 9.1 mi (14.6 km)

=== Inside the Beltway ===
The Interstate 66 Express lanes began operation on December 4, 2017. Unlike the other HO/T projects, the I-66 Inside the Beltway project uses existing infrastructure to provide multimodal ways of travel along the nine-mile (14 km) segment between US-29 in Rosslyn and I-495 (the Capital Beltway). It allows drivers to pay the toll, use the road, Carpool or Vanpool with an E-ZPass Flex, or use Public Transportation. Hybrid vehicles, vehicles with Clean Special Fuel license plates, and people traveling to and from Dulles International Airport are no longer exempt from restrictions and must either pay the toll or satisfy the HOV rules. Motorcycles and vehicles carrying three or more people are eligible for free travel. These lanes are free to all drivers during off-peak periods and weekends.

The peak periods of these lanes, to maintain a minimum average speed of 45 mph (70 km/h), are:

- Monday through Friday 5:30–9:30 am (eastbound)
- Monday through Friday 3:00–7:00 pm (westbound)

During peak periods, if drivers carpool with three or more people (HOV-3), they can travel on I-66 during rush hours for free with an E-ZPass Flex set to HOV mode to travel toll-free.

This is the first time single-occupancy vehicles are permitted to use I-66 inside the Beltway during rush hours, as the road has been subject to HOV restrictions since it opened in 1982.

66 Express Outside the Beltway
- Location: US 29 in Gainesville to Interstate 495 in Tysons
- Length: 22.5 mi (36.2 km)

=== Outside the Beltway ===
I-66 Outside the Beltway is a project that started construction in 2018, which aims to ease congestion along the corridor, ease gridlock at its most heavily used interchanges, and provide more ways to travel along the corridor. The project was completed in 2022. It runs west from the Capital Beltway to US-29 in Gainesville for 22.5 miles (36.2 km). Changes that are made along the corridor are:

- Add two express lanes in each direction
- Provide access to the express lanes along the corridor and at interchanges
- Reconfigure challenging interchanges
- Provide sound walls and pedestrian/bike pathways
- Add new Park and Ride lots along the corridor

The new express lanes operate like the 495 Express Lanes, with E-ZPass required to use the lanes for all vehicles other than motorcycles. Carpoolers need an E-ZPass Flex and 3 or more people in the vehicle to travel free. However, large vehicles, such as trucks or vehicles with more than two axles (buses ride free) will be able to use the lanes at 3 times the price during non-rush hour periods and weekends, and 5 times the price during peak hours. Large vehicles are still not permitted to use any other express lanes unless explicitly posted.

== I-64 Express Lanes ==
I-64 Express Lanes
- Location: Interstate 564 in Norfolk to Interstate 264 near Virginia Beach
- Length: 8.4 mi (13.5 km)

The I-64 Express Lanes are a public-private partnership between TransCore and VDOT to convert the eight-mile (13 km) stretch of existing HOV lanes to rush-hour toll lanes.

Operating hours are:

- 24/7 in whatever direction the express lanes are open.

Heavy trucks are prohibited on the express lanes, which are limited to vehicles with two axles; buses, motorcycles, and carpools may ride for free. Carpoolers also need an E-ZPass Flex for toll-free travel at all times.

VDOT is proposing to extend the I-64 Express Lanes past the I-264 interchange to near the US-258 interchange. VDOT has also proposed to build new express lanes in each direction on the stretch from the I-664 interchange before the Hampton Roads Bridge–Tunnel to the I-564 interchange.

== Gallery ==
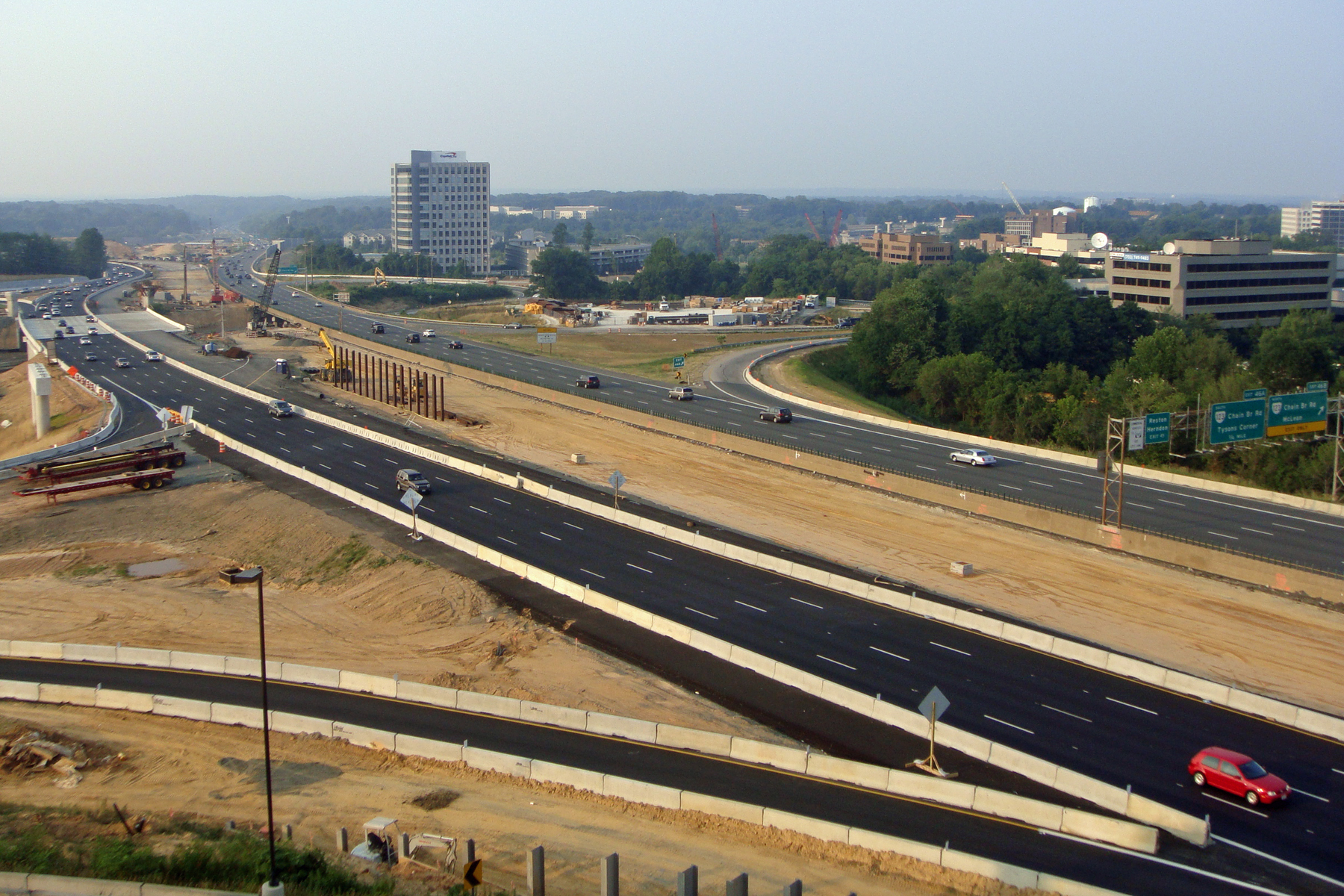
I-495 construction as of July 2011

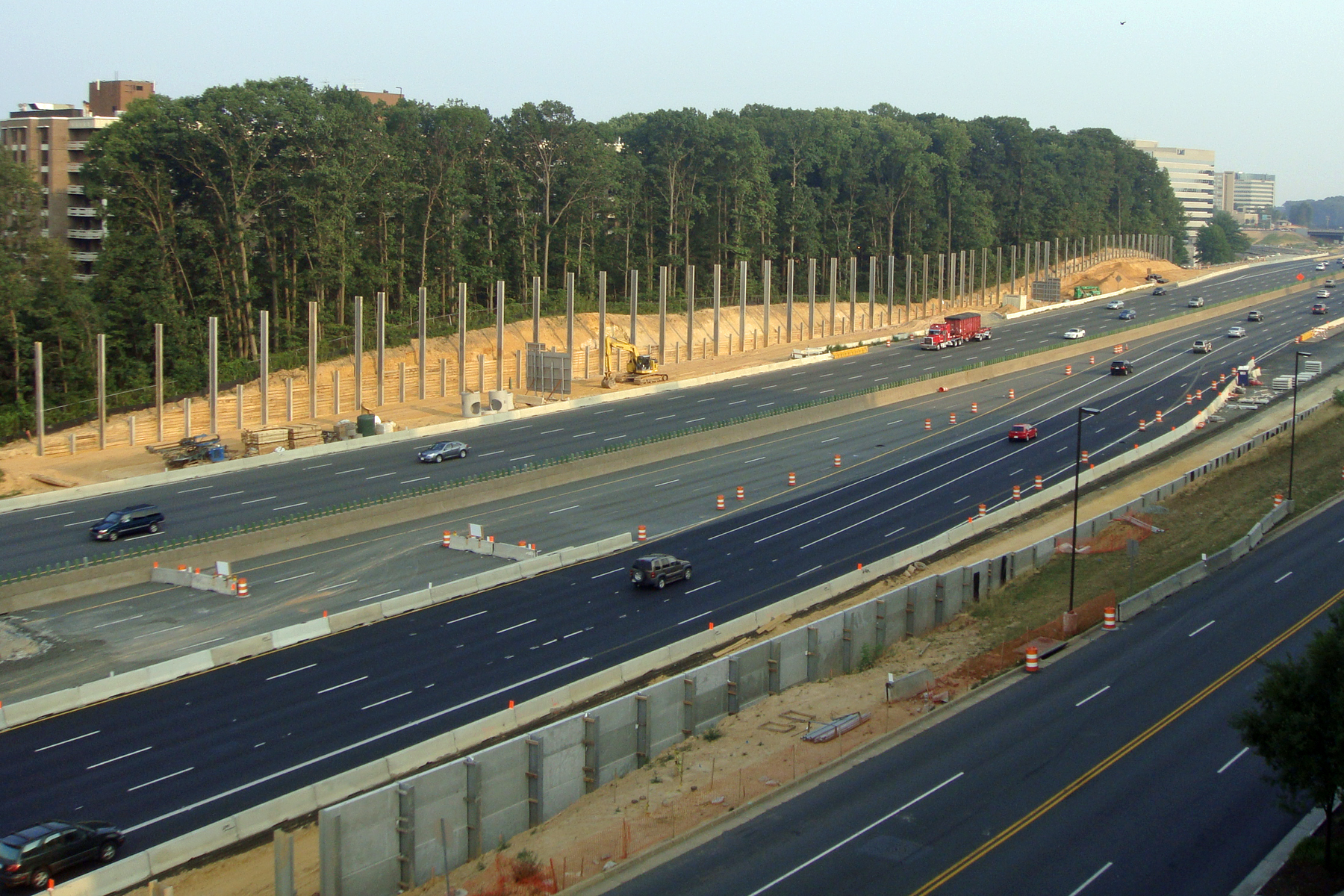
I-495 construction as of July 2011

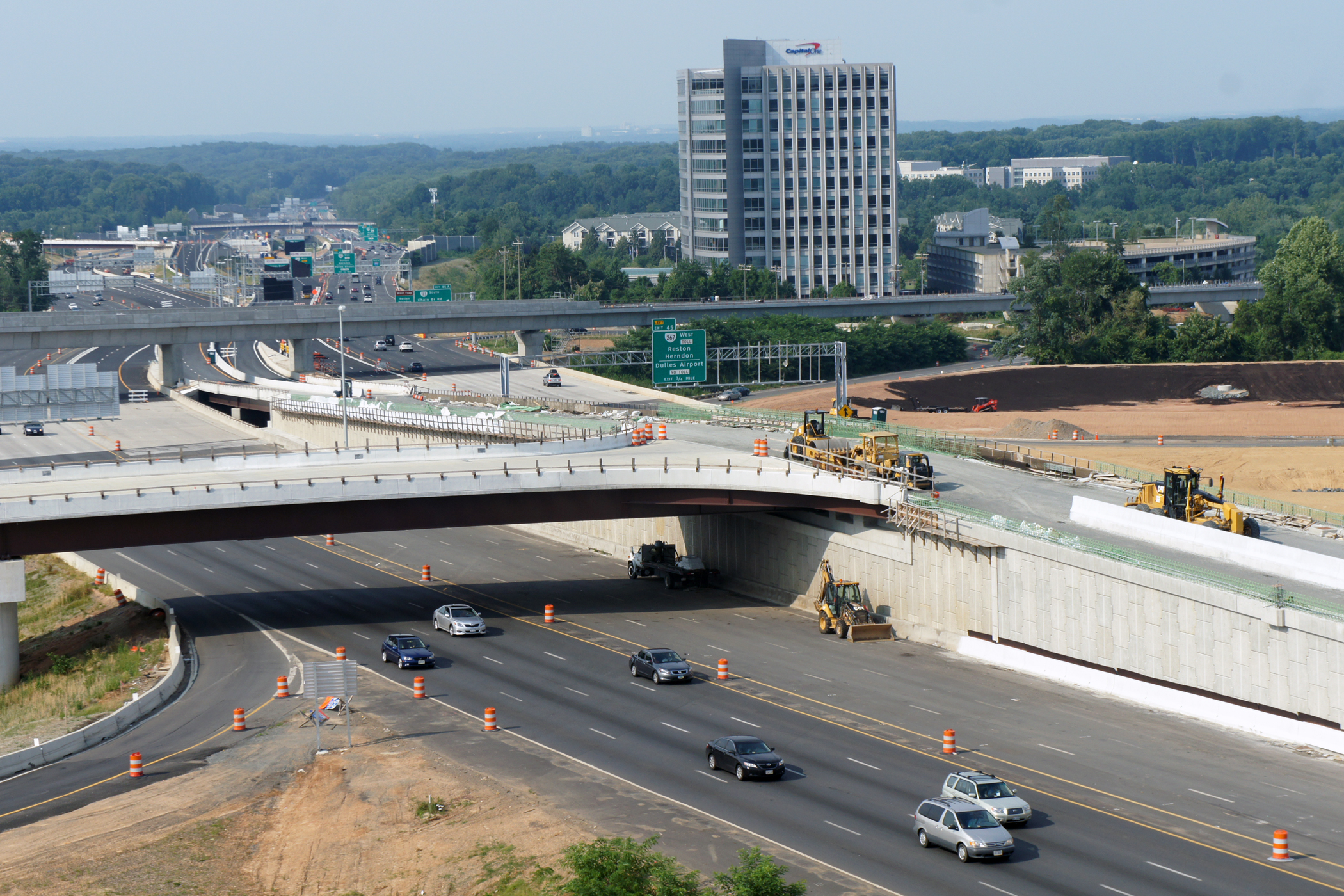
I-495 construction as of July 2012

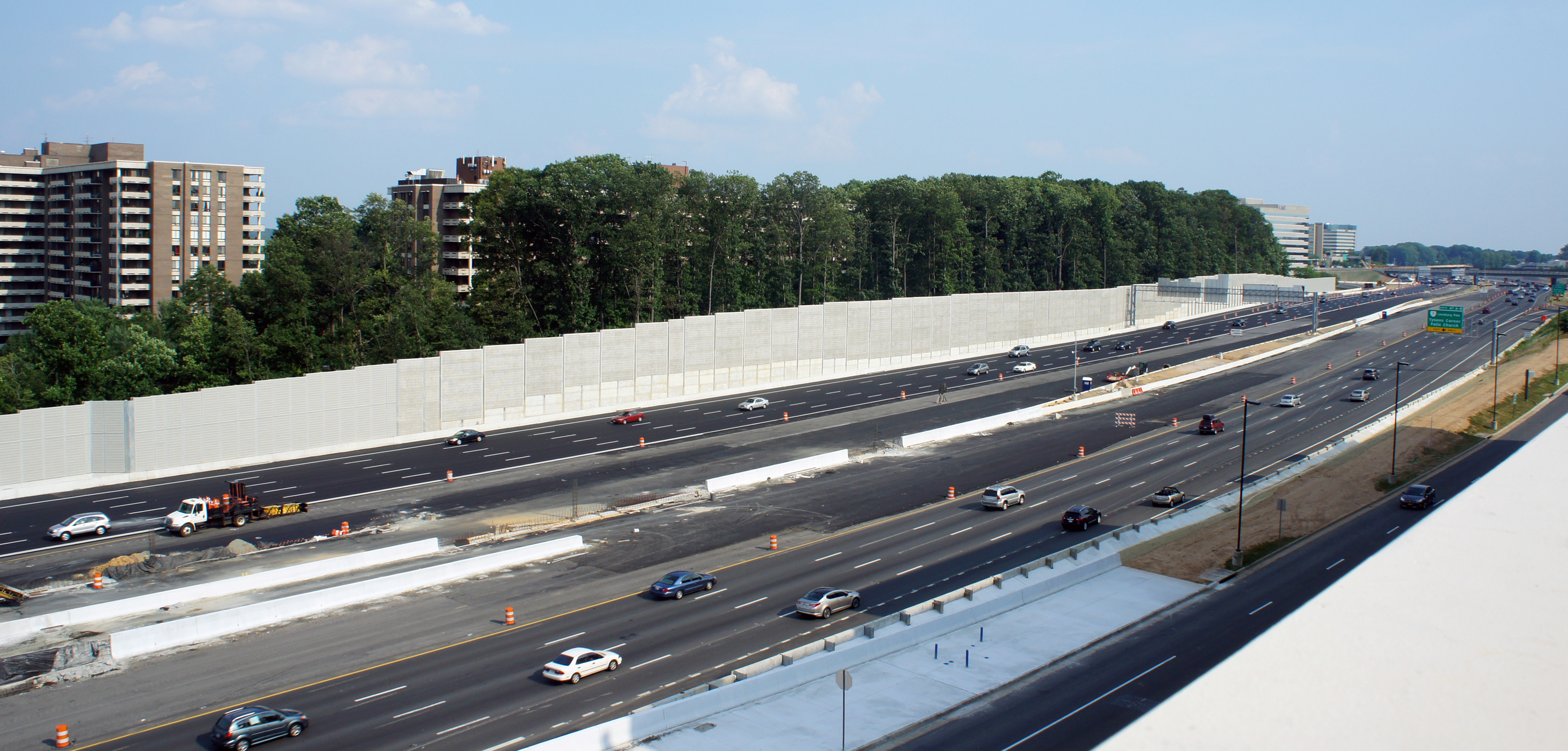
I-495 construction as of July 2012

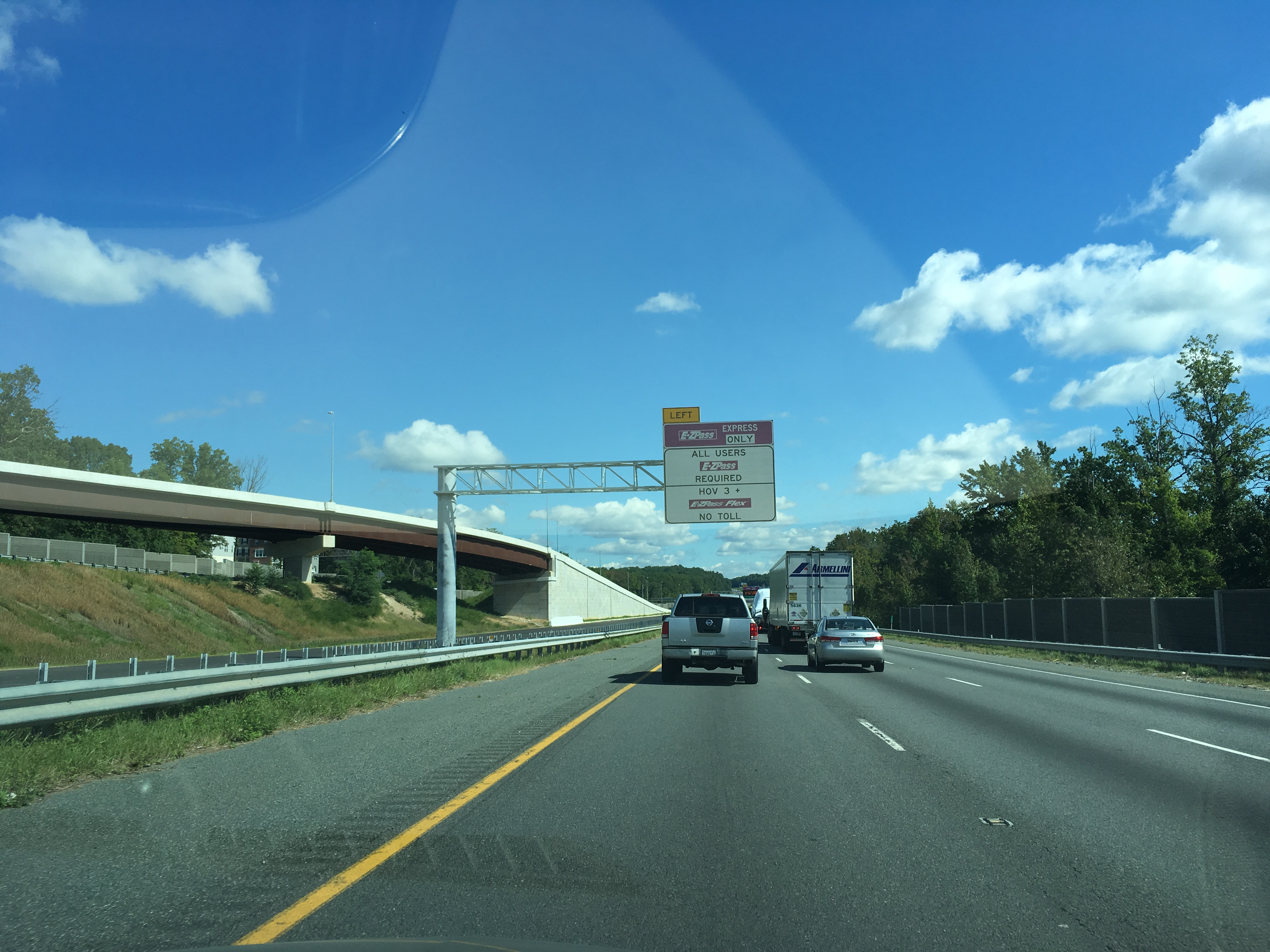
Sign advising of requirements of HO/T lanes
