= Loudoun County Combined Fire and Rescue System =

Coordinates: 39.09°N 77.64°W

Loudoun County Fire & Rescue
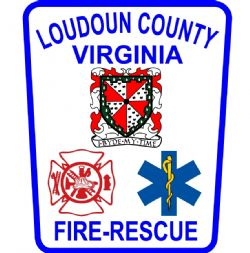

Operational area
- Country: United States
- State: Virginia
- County: Loudoun

Agency overview
- Staffing: Career and volunteer
- Fire chief: James Williams
- EMS level: ALS/BLS
- IAFF: 3756
- Motto: Teamwork.Integrity.Professionalism.Service. (TIPS)

Facilities and equipment
- Battalions: 3
- Stations: 24
- Engines: 33
- Trucks: 6
- Tillers: 2
- Platforms: 4
- Rescues: 5
- Ambulances: 44
- Tenders: 15
- HAZMAT: 1
- Light and air: 2

Website
- Official website
- IAFF website

The Loudoun County Combined Fire-Rescue System (LC-CFRS) is made up of the career Loudoun County Fire and Rescue (LCFR) and 16 volunteer organizations. LC-CFRS has the responsibility of protecting the citizens and property of the towns, villages, and suburbs of Loudoun County, Virginia, from fires and fire hazards, providing emergency medical services, and technical rescue response services, including Hazardous Materials mitigation, Mass Casualty Incident response services, environmental danger response services and more. The headquarters and training facilities of the department are in Leesburg, off Sycolin Road.

LC-CFRS, has approximately 700 volunteer personnel and 800 career staff that make up its firefighters, emergency medical technicians (EMT), paramedics and other emergency responders. LC-CFRS uses a combined system to help respond to a diverse population spread throughout a suburban and rural county. Units can respond to building types that range from wood-frame single-family homes to high-rise structures, bridges and tunnels, large parks and wooded areas that can give rise to major brush fires, as well as large stretches of forest and mountains, such as the Blue Ridge Mountains, in addition to metro and bus lines. LC-CFRS provides care for a very large and diverse area, responding from stations scattered strategically throughout the county.

== Organization ==
LC-CFRS uses a combination system, with career employees and volunteer members, to provide fire, rescue, and emergency medical services (EMS) to its citizens.

Throughout the 1980s and much of the 1990s, Loudoun's fire/rescue services were provided by volunteers supplemented by career Firefighter/Emergency Medical Technicians (EMTs). Over time, increased demand for service coupled with fewer volunteers available during daytime hours necessitated hiring additional career personnel.

Between Fiscal Year (FY) 93 and FY09, the number of career personnel has grown from 56.95 Full-Time Equivalent Employees (FTEs) to 504.01 FTEs.4 The volunteer component of the System comprises an estimated 1,476 total volunteers, approximately 770 of whom are active either operationally and/or administratively. Both of these groups see continuous, steady growth in terms of numbers and operational members.

LC-CFRS, around 2015, began the process of evaluating and potentially restructuring the department's upper management: the Fire-Rescue Commission, a board that oversees the entirety of the department, reports to the Chief and the county Board of Supervisors. The new structure will eliminate the commission, and will replace it with an executive committee, made up of several sub-committees (Presidents, Rescue Chiefs, and Fire Chiefs committees, amongst others), that will report to the Chief. The Chief will in turn then report to the County Administrator, who will report to the BOS. In 2015, LCFR instituted billing for EMS transports to hospitals, in a soft-billing capacity.

=== LC-CFRS ===
At the head of the Loudoun County Combined Fire-Rescue System, including the career and volunteer personnel that make up the department, is Chief James Williams (C600). Under Chief Williams are two Assistant Chiefs, and ten Deputy Chiefs, six in charge of a branch of the department and four serving as rotating Operations Shift Commanders. Additionally serving directly under Chief Williams is Dr. Mary Maguire, Manager of Finance and Administrative Services and the department of Professional Standards. The Office of Emergency Management used to operate under the Chief of the department, before it was moved, sometime between 2017 and 2019, to be directly under the County Administrator, Tim Hemstreet, who the Chief also reports to. In 2025 Keith Johnson appointed James Williams after his announcement of his retirement from system-wide chief which was effective in 4/11/2025.

In a March 2018 Board of Directors meeting, a budget was approved that included funding for a new Deputy Chief for Volunteer Services, as well as two more Shift Commanders, four more EMS Supervisors (creating a new EMS 602 position), and other ancillary positions. EMS602 is placed at Purcellville Public Safety Center. On 5/9/18, an internal department memo confirmed that starting in late June, 2018, the Shift Commander would become a 24/7 role, based out of Station 22, and that EMS602 would be out of Station 14. In July, 2018 it was announced that Deputy Chief Williams had been promoted to the Assistant Chief role; leaving his DC spot to be filled, as well as a new DC for Volunteer Services position. In Summer 2017, LCFR implemented a "Shift Commander" position, operating 7 days a week from 0600 to 1800, that utilizes two Deputy Chiefs on a rotating schedule. These two positions assumed the responsibilities of the old Deputy Chief of Operations position. With the addition of two more Shift Commanders in Spring, 2018, the position became a 24/7 role. These four Deputy Chiefs all rotate being on duty, while on duty they are referred to as the Shift Commander, with a dispatch callsign of "Operations 600".

Within LCFR, there is a Fire-Rescue System Chief, two Assistant Chiefs (ACs), and ten Deputy Chiefs (DCs), who are each in charge of multiple departments, sections, programs, or endeavors.

Fire-Rescue System Chief (radio/dispatch ID):

- Chief James Williams (C600)

The two Assistant Chiefs are responsible for:

- Operations: Acting Assistant Chief Michael Nally (AC600)
- Support Services & Volunteer Administration: Assistant Chief Travis Preau (AC600B)

The ten Deputy Chiefs are responsible for:

- Operations: Three Deputy Chiefs rotating under the title of "Shift Commander" - Deputy Chief's Michael Nally, Aaron Jacobs, & Roger Martin (O600, O600B)
- Fire Marshal's Office: Chief Fire Marshall Micah Kiger (FM600)
- Volunteer Services: Deputy Chief Lupton (DC640)
- Communications and Support Services: Deputy Chief Justin Green (DC650)
- EMS: Deputy Chief Jamie Cooper (DC660)
- Asset Management: Deputy Chief Adam Davis (DC670)
- Training: Deputy Chief Nicole Pickrell (DC690)

Medical Director's Office:

- Operational Medical Director: Dr. John Morgan (OMD600)
- Assistant Operational Medical Director: Al Pacifico PA-C (OMD600B)

Recent System Chiefs:

- 2025–Present James Williams
- 2018-2025 Keith Johnson
- 2010-2018 Keith Brower
- ?-2010 Joseph Pozzo

=== Volunteer companies ===
While each volunteer company falls under the Loudoun County Fire and Rescue Department, each is largely responsible for its own administration and operation, on a day-to-day basis. LCFR provides support for volunteer companies through partial funding, training, protocols, and legal aid. While many companies often have the term "Department" in their name, such as Ashburn Volunteer Fire-Rescue Department, the correct term for these organizations would be "Company", to distinguish them from the overall department. Volunteer and career staff provide the same services and generally share the same standards in training and performance of services.

In speech, the physical building a company runs out of will often be referred to as a "station", and the organizational entity is often referred to as a "company". This is to help distinguish between companies that have multiple buildings/stations (such as Sterling Fire – stations 611, 618 and 624 and Sterling Rescue – stations 615, 625 and 635, Ashburn Fire and Rescue – stations 606 and 622, Leesburg Fire – stations 601 and 620), or mainly career staffed stations (such as Lucketts 610 and Philomont 608 which have some volunteer assistance, or Kirkpatrick Farms 627, Moorefield 623, Loudoun Heights 626, and Dulles South 619, which are completely career-staffed), from all other organizations with only a single building, which can be as easily referenced as company or station.

Each volunteer company draws its members primarily from the local community. While most volunteers join the company in their area, it is not uncommon for some members to run at different companies, depending on that individual's schedule, interests, or personality as well as the membership options offered by the individual company.

The membership of volunteer companies in the LC-CFRS system are usually headed by a Board of Directors (BOD). Sitting on the board will be members of the community as well as senior officers from the company. Under the BOD, are the two branches of a volunteer company, the Administrative side and the Operations side. At the head of each wing are the President and Fire/Rescue Chief, respectively. The President's Administrative side will see to the day-to-day functioning of the company, finances, support, and paperwork. Under the president are usually a vice president, secretary, treasurer, committee directors, and a Trial Board. The operations wing staff apparatus, respond to emergencies, train, and are largely the public face of a company. Under the Fire or Rescue Chief, depending on the nature and size of the company, there will be an assistant chief, deputy chiefs, captains, lieutenants, sergeants, engineers, crew chiefs (also called officers/attendants-in-charge), and then the firefighters and EMTs. The number, and type, of officers in a company depends largely on its size, with a small company having as few as five operational officers (not counting crew chiefs) and four administrative officers, or as many as fifteen officers in a larger company (not including Crew Chiefs). For example, Purcellville Volunteer Fire Company has one chief, one assistant chief, two captains and two lieutenants, but neither deputy chiefs nor sergeants. However, Leesburg Volunteer Fire Company has three captains and six lieutenants, in addition to other positions. From a summer 2017 reorganization approved by Chief Brower, career and volunteer officers up to captain are equivalently ranked, with career battalion chiefs being equivalent to an individual company chief, and career officers higher than battalion chief outranking all volunteer officers.

Currently, with the exception of Purcellville Rescue (CO. 14) and the stations that maintain 24/7 career staff (irrelevant of partial volunteer support, such as 8 and 10), every company in LC-CFRS is split in some way between career staff during the day (0600-1800) and volunteer staff during the night (1800-0600), with weekend coverage varying depending on company. For instance, Lovettsville Fire & Rescue, Round Hill, Hamilton, Lucketts, Philomont, Arcola, Aldie, maintains 24/7 coverage, while Purcellville Fire (CO. 2) continues the career/volunteer split shift throughout the entire week, including the weekend. Sterling Rescue manages three stations, one of the stations is staffed by the volunteers 24/7 (Station 25) and the other station is staffed by volunteers evenings and weekends, with a cooperative agreement for career staffing 24 hours at Station 35.

== Area served ==
The Loudoun County Fire and Rescue Department helps protects an area as far east as Fairfax County, Virginia, west to the Blue Ridge Mountains and Clark County, VA, north to the Potomac River and Frederick County, MD, and south past Route 50 to Route 620 – Braddock Road and the counties of Fauquier and Prince William, VA.

=== Mutual-Aid ===
As a result of the mutual-aid agreements in place in by Metropolitan Washington Council of Governments in the Washington Metropolitan Area, a standard numbering system was put into place for area fire and rescue departments. All units have a 3-4 digit designator, with the first digit denoting what agency the unit is from.

- 000 series Washington, D.C.
- 100 series Arlington County, Virginia (includes City of Falls Church)
- 200 series City of Alexandria, Virginia
- 300 series Metropolitan Washington Airports Authority (includes Reagan National Airport and Dulles International Airport)
- 400 series Fairfax County, Virginia (includes City of Fairfax)
- 500 series Prince William County, Virginia (Includes City of Manassas and City of Manassas Park)
- 600 series Loudoun County, Virginia
- 700 series Montgomery County, Maryland
- 800 series Prince George's County, Maryland
- 900 series Frederick County, Maryland
- 1000 series Charles County, Maryland
- 1100 series Fauquier County, Virginia
- 1200 series Culpeper County, Virginia
- 1300 series Warren County, Virginia
- 1400 series Rappahannock County, Virginia

Loudoun County uses the 600 series designators. To reference companies and stations, the number of the organization follow a 6 – Station 606 for Ashburn, Company 612 for Lovettsville, and so on. To reference specific apparatus, the unit is referenced first by type (truck, ambulance, engine, etc.), then by station, using the prior 606 or 616 format, and then a specific alphanumeric identifier, if multiples of the same type run from that company. For example, the sole engine from Company 4 would always be referred to as Engine 604, the only tanker from Company 12 is Tanker 612, and the lone ambulance at station 626 is Ambulance 626. However, since Company 614 has three ambulances, they are permanently referred to respectively as Ambulance 614, 614B, and 614C.

Previously, Loudoun differed from other COG jurisdictions in that units used a numerical form to differentiate between units of the same type, as listed above. In other jurisdictions, apparatus of the same type have an alphabetical marking for identical units. Ambulances from the same company would be listed as Ambulance 404A and 404B, instead of Ambulance 606–1, as in Loudoun County. However, in May 2013, Loudoun switched to COG standards for fire vehicles, but not rescue vehicles. Wagon and Reserve Engine identifiers were retired and replaced with COG-compliant identifiers. For example, Reserve Engine 606 became E606B and Wagon 606 became E606C. The identifier for Rescue Engines was changed from ER to the COG-compliant RE. Jeeps were also redesignated as Brush units. All reserve units (Reserve Tankers (RK), Reserve Trucks (RT), etc.) were also redesignated as COG-compliant. (LCFR IB 2013–015). In November 2013 EMS vehicles began to follow the COG format.

In October 2013, it was announced that Loudoun had decided to fully adopt the COG pattern of apparatus designation and that ambulances would be transitioning to the new monikers November 4. Following the recent implementation of COG designations for fire apparatus, ambulances and other EMS vehicles will now use the -alpha (implied), -bravo, -charlie, etc. designations.

In Summer 2016, the entire Loudoun County public safety system went through a series of technology and CAD upgrades, and in the process changed some unit identifiers. While still following many COG guidelines, many apparatus designations were modified.

During an emergency that would require a response from multiple agencies, dispatchers are quickly able to identify what county or city a particular piece of apparatus came from, as well as request additional units from neighboring counties and jurisdictions if their own resources have been exhausted.

LC-CFRS also has mutual-aid agreements in place with non-COG counties, such as Jefferson County, West Virginia and Clarke County, Virginia. Likewise, for emergencies that require helicopter pick up for critical patients, LC-CFRS has agreements with Petroleum Helicopters International (PHi Air Medical), a national company that has rescue helicopters stationed throughout the D.C. Metro Area, as well as the rest of the United States, with the closest one, Air Care 3, stationed at Leesburg Airport. In March 2018 it was announced that LCFR was seeking a MOU with the Little Fork Volunteer Fire-Rescue's Technical Large Animal Rescue Team.

According to a briefing presented by the Communications Division, units from certain divisions generally fall under a set numbering, which was slightly modified in summer 2019:

- The 650 series is assigned to Communications.
- The 660 series is assigned to the Fire Marshal's Office (FMO).
- The 670 series is assigned to LCFR Administration.
- The 680 series is assigned to the Office of Emergency Management (OEM) (MC 680 = MCI Trailer) and to the reserve fleet (Rescue 680, ALS 680).
- The 690 series is assigned to the Training Center and some reserve pieces (Engines 690-91-98-99, Truck 690)

Other ancillary positions that fall under this special designation are as follows:

- Staffing Lieutenant (Operations Aide): OAIDE600
- Staffing Captain: CAP600
- Logistics: LOG600
- Battalion Chief (Relief): BC604
- Battalion Chief (Special Operations): BC600 and BC600B
- Battalion Chief (Communications): BC650
- Radio Systems (Communications): COM651-653
- Battalion Chief (EMS): BC660
- Battalion Chief (Health & Safety): BC 670
- Battalion Chief (Facilities): BC671
- Captains (Administrative roles): CAP670-672
- Apparatus: APP670
- Battalion Chief (Training): BC690
- Captains (Training): CAP690-691

Per the Virginia Safe Haven Law and emphasized during a significant event in spring of 2013, an open informational bulletin was released by LCFR to remind both the department and the public that all staffed fire and rescue stations were mandated to accept any child less than 14 days that was safely handed over by a parent (as opposed to being left at the door), providing a defense against abuse or neglect charges.

== Notable Incidents ==
- September 11, 2001 - Pentagon Terror Attack: Like the majority of fire departments in the D.C.-metro area, LC-CFRS played a part in the response, including station back-fill and recovery work.
- May 25, 2008 - Meadowood Ct. Fire: Mayday Alert event with multiple injured firefighters - case study used through subsequent training at the Fire Academy.
- February 16, 2024 - Silver Ridge Dr. Explosion: Mayday and subsequent LODD event, where firefighters responding to an inside gas leak were caught in an explosion. Firefighter Trevor Brown of Sterling Volunteer Fire Company was killed in the blast, and 10 other firefighters from LC-CFRS were injured and hospitalized.
- July 31, 2024 - Sous Vide Lane: HAMZAT/MCI, Ammonia leak in building, 287 people were evaluated, 33 were transported, 5 critical. This was the largest Loudoun County EMS response to date.
- May 9, 2025 - Leesburg Pike/Loudoun County Parkway westbound: MVA vs Pedestrian, LC-CFRS Ambulance was involved in a serious accident on Route 7 in the area of Loudoun County Parkway, killing one victim who was struck.

== Fire and rescue stations and apparatus ==
Station	Location	Staffing	Fire units			EMS units		Other units
Station	Location	Volunteer/Career	Engine	Truck	Tanker	Rescue	Ambulance	Other units
Station 601	Leesburg	Volunteer & Career PM upstaffing	E (2)					CC, CU, U, UTV
Station 602	Purcellville	Day=Career, Night=Volunteer	E, RE	TW	K			BC, B(2), SV, CC, U, N
Station 603	Middleburg	Career	E(2)		K		A (2)	B, U, MC
Station 604	Round Hill	Volunteer & Career	E, RE		K		A(2)	B, CV, U, N, NC
Station 605	Hamilton	Career	E, RE		K			B, CC, U
Station 606	Ashburn	Day=Career, Night=Volunteer	E (3)	TW, T, TT			A (3)	CC(4), ALS, SV, N, U, UTV, SC
Station 607	Aldie	Career	E			R	A	B, SV, U, UTV, WL
Station 608	Philomont	Career	PE, E		K			B, SV, CC, LA, AU
Station 609	Arcola	Day=Career, Night=Volunteer	E (3)		K		A (3)	B(2), ALS, CC, SV, SU(2), U, UTV(2), N
Station 610	Lucketts	Career	E		K		A	B(2), Z(2), SWT, CV, U
Station 611	Sterling Park	Day=Career, Night=Volunteer	E (2)	TW, T				CU, SV, CC, N, B*
Station 612	Lovettsville	Day=Career, Night=Volunteer	E(2)		K		A (2)	CV, B, U, ALS
Station 613	Leesburg	Day=Career, Night=Volunteer					A (6)	Y, ALS, CC, UTV, SV, SWT, U, Z, CU
Station 614	Purcellville	Volunteer					A (3)	EM602, CV, ALS (2), MC, N (2), CH, UTV
Station 615	Sterling Park	Day=Career, Night=Volunteer					A (3)	ALS, U, Y, CC, Z, UTV, SWT
Station 617	Hamilton	Day=Career, Night=Volunteer				R	A (3)	CC (2), CV (1), ALS601, U, UTV(2)
Station 618	Cascades	Day=Career, Night=Volunteer	E (2)					CC, SV, N
Station 619	Dulles South Riding	Career	E	TW			A (1)	BC, H, HS, DE
Station 620	Leesburg	Day=Career, Night=Volunteer	E	TT		R		CC, SWT, TRSU
Station 621	Mount Weather	Career	E	T			A (2)	B, HS, SU(3), CC(2), UTV
Station 622	Lansdowne	Day=Career, Night=Volunteer	E (2)		K		A (2)	SO601, O
Station 623	Moorefield	Career	E				A (2)	MAB, EM601
Station 624	Kincora	Career	E					Q, BC
Station 625	Cascades	Volunteer				TR	A (3)	AL, SV(2), Z(2), Y, ST (3) SWT, N
Station 626	Loudoun Heights	Career	PE		K		A	B
Station 627	Kirkpatrick Farms	Career	PE		K		A	
Station 628(F)	Leesburg South							
Station 635	Kincora	Day=Career, Night=Volunteer				R	A(2)	AL, U, ST, Y, MC615, SWT
Station 690/699	LCFR Headquarters & Training Center	Career	E(4)	T	K	R	A(4)	BC604, BU699, EM, CC(4), SO(2), CD, OP, ST(8), V(4), U680, R680 UTV(3)
Red Rum Warehouse	Red Rum Drive, Ashburn	Career	E				A (2)	LU
Office of Emergency Management (OEM)	LCFR Headquarters	Career						CP680, OE(6), MC, UTV(5), U
LCFR Headquarters	801 Sycolin Rd.	Career						C600, AC600, AC600B, OMD600
Fire Marshal's Office (FMO)	Station 9	Career						FM (14), BD (2), FMT
Inova Loudoun Hospital (Lansdowne)	Ashburn							DE600
Unit types: This key attempts to duplicate the terminology used for dispatch, however there are some unique identifiers used here that are not used operationally in the county. Not every key below is included in the unit list above, as there can be overlap (such as when a Chief is running a Command unit). (#)=Number of units A=Ambulance, ALS=ALS Chase, AU=Mobile Air Unit B=Brush/Jeep, BC=Battalion Chief, BD=Bomb Disposal (FMO), BU=Bus, BS=Boat Support C=Chief, CC=Command Chase, CD=Chief of Department, CU=Canteen Unit, CN=Captain, CP=Command Post, CV=Chase Vehicle (BLS/ALS) DC=Deputy Chief, DE=Decon Trailer, DO=Duty Officer E=Engine, EM=EMS Supervisor FM=Fire Marshal H=HazMat Unit, HS=HazMat Support JS=Jet Ski K=Tanker LA=Light/Air Unit, LU=Logistics Unit MAB=Mobile Ambulance Bus, MCI=Mass Casualty Incident Trailer, MC=Mass Casualty Support Unit N=Chaplain (Individuals, not vehicles), NC=Chaplain Chase vehicle OE=Office of Emergency Management (individuals), OMD=Operational Medical Director, O=Deputy Chief of Operations 600 PIO=Public Information Officer, PE=Paramedic Engine Q=Quint R=Heavy Rescue, RE=Rescue Engine SC=Shift Commander, SV=SERV, SO=Safety Officer, ST=Support Trailer (trailer with specific equipment, such as HM or MCI), SU=Support Unit, SWT=Swift Water Team T=Truck, TT=Tiller, TW=Tower Ladder, TR=Technical Rescue U=Utility, UTV=All-Terrain Utility Vehicle (Gator, Polaris, etc.) V=Van WL=Wild Land unit Y=Bike Team Z=Zodiac Water Unit (boat, etc.) Note after May 13, 2013: Wagon and Reserve Engine identifiers were retired and replaced with COG-compliant identifiers. For example, RE606 became E606B and W606 became E606C. The identifier for Rescue Engines was changed from ER to the COG-complaint RE. Jeeps were also re-designated as Brush units. All reserve units (Reserve Tankers (RK), Reserve Trucks (RT), etc.) were also re-designated as COG-compliant. (LCFR IB 2013–015) On November 4, 2013, all county EMS units began using the COG-compliant identifiers. The 4th number in the old identifier is replaced with the corresponding letter of the alphabet (except for 1, which has no letter). A613-1 is now A613, A613-2 is A613B, A613-3 is A613C, etc. (F)=Future/Planned Station (UC)=Under Construction (*)=Future Unit Note: Under LC-CFRS procedures, some trucks/towers and rescue engines can operate as medium rescues, or "squads," as needed, assuming certain staffing and equipment requirements are met. This is to help offset the limited number of heavy rescue apparatus. Examples of apparatus capable of this would be Trucks 601, 606, and 620, and Rescue Engines 602 and 609.

== Company/station histories ==
- Leesburg Fire, Companies 1 & 20—"The Big House" & "The Pride of Old Town"

Leesburg Volunteer Fire Company was formed on November 15, 1803, and occupies two locations in Leesburg. Station 1 is located at 215 W. Loudoun Street, and houses support units and retired apparatus for LVFC, as well as houses the live-in members. Station 20 is the predominantly active arm of LVFC and runs out of the station located on Plaza Street next to the Leesburg Police station. However, unit numbering is not totally indicative of station—for instance, the tiller stationed at 20 was long called Truck 601, however, due to the new backup truck that was purchased now using that designation, it is now called Truck 620. While some Leesburg units are numbered from Station 1, many are still located at Station 20. LVFC has announced plans to the Fire & Rescue Commission to remodel the old Station 1, and to return it to active service (instead of using it as a holding facility), instead of building a brand new Station 1. Currently, minimal operations occur out of Station 1, and it is primarily used for storage. It is unclear how the proposed opening of a South Leesburg station will affect LVFC and operations out of Station 1 – whether LVFC will continue to run minimal operations out of the space, it will be closed, or expanded use will be found. Company 1/20 is complemented by LCFR career staffing during day shift, 0600–1800. Leesburg's tanker is unique, in that it has the capacity to run as an engine – all the other tankers in LC-CFRS are limited to their tanker role. Tankers are easy to distinguish in Loudoun, but Co. 1-20's tanker has the appearance of an engine, though much taller. In August 2015, Rescue 613 was relinquished by Loudoun Volunteer Rescue Squad, and reassigned to Station 20 as Rescue 620, to be operated 24/7 by career personnel.

- Purcellville Public Safety Center, Purcellville Fire, Company 2—"The Deuce"

The Purcellville Volunteer Fire Company, nicknamed "The Deuce," was formed in the early 20th century. At the time, two hand-drawn chemical wagons were placed in service. In 1923, PVFD received its charter and the era of motorized fire apparatus began. PVFC recently moved into a new station on the north end of Purcellville with PVRS Co. 14. Company 2 has two alternating shifts of LCFR career staff, A and B shift, during the day from 0600 to 1800 hrs, and six volunteer crews at night from 1800 to 0600. Station 2 also houses Battalion Chief 602 – BC 602 is set to receive a new buggy within the coming months. While the unit will reflect the new color scheme for county vehicles, the unit will be a departure from all other chase vehicles, in that instead of a Tahoe style body, a small pickup with a covered bed will be used – potentially to reflect the more rural nature of the 2nd Battalion. PVFC is currently in the process of planning and ordering a brand new Tower, to replace the current TL602.

- Middleburg Fire and Rescue, Company 3—"The Fightin' Foxes" (DISBANDED) / LCFR Middleburg, Station 3

When the Middleburg Volunteer Fire Department was incorporated in 1936, it had one fire truck and covered the Route 50 corridor from the top of Paris Mountain to Chantilly. In the early 1950s, Co. 3 was given an ambulance and initiated emergency medical care, becoming fire and rescue. Relations between career & volunteers become strained in 2010, but career staff have recently returned to CO. 3, staffing the station 24/7. Station 3 was remodeled after the bay roof collapsed in the winter storms of 2010–11. In Summer 2015 Middleburg Volunteer Fire-Rescue disbanded and is no longer an organization, having sold all of its equipment and property to the county or other entities. LCFR Career personnel will now operate out of Station 3, but will continue to use the Middleburg Volunteer Fire-Rescue name for the short term, as a gesture of respect to the former volunteers.

- Round Hill Fire and Rescue, Company 4-"The Fearless Fourth"

The Round Hill Fire Department was started in the early 20th century. Its equipment consisted of a hand-pulled cart carrying several lengths of hose. The first fire alarm was sounded by clanging a big iron bell. In 1938, the Round Hill Volunteer Fire Dept. was formally organized. The first piece of equipment purchased was a used truck that had a water tank and pump mounted on it. Next, a siren and fire extinguishers were added. In 1949, the first ambulance was purchased. Round Hill relies largely on 24/7 career staff now, with some volunteers at nights, weekends, & for events.

- Hamilton Fire, Company 5—"The Nickel" & "The Fighting Fifth"

The Hamilton Volunteer Fire Department held its first organized meeting in July 1944, and a year later purchased its first fire truck. In January 1946, it moved into its firehouse which, with remodeling and additions, is still in use. HVFD has an attack pumper, a pumper/tanker, a brush truck and a light and air unit. It has a BLS non-transport license to provide EMS assistance and over a dozen of its average of 30 active members are qualified 1st Responders or EMTs. In 2000, HVFD and the Hamilton Volunteer Rescue Squad together purchased 10 acres (40,000 m^{2}) of land to build the Hamilton Public Safety Center where both companies are housed. Many Company 5 personnel run with HVRS or help staff Rescue 617. ALS 601, a career unit, is also housed at station 5/17, in addition to career staffing during weekdays from 0600 to 1800 hrs. In October 2013, HVFC requested immediate 7−12 career support, meaning that county staff would run 7 nights week, instead of the prior 5, with 24/7 support requested as soon as possible. Additionally in October, ALS 601 that had been running out of Station 17 along with a career ambulance during the day, instituted a new policy where the ALS providers for ALS 601 will cross-staff a medic unit. This means that if an ALS call goes out in Hamilton's first due, Medic 617 will take the call, but if it is outside of Hamilton's first due, ALS 601 will take the call, placing M617 out of service. In May 2014, HVFC requested immediate emergency staffing due to an inadequate number of volunteers, which LCFR fulfilled. This means that HVFC is now staffed 24/7 by LCFR personnel with some assistance from HVFC.

- Ashburn Fire and Rescue, Companies 6 & 22—"The Swarm" & "The Rt. 7 Express"

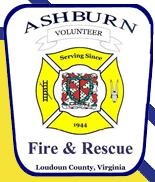
Logo of the Ashburn Volunteer Fire-Rescue Department.

The Ashburn Volunteer Fire Department was started in 1947 after the tragic deaths of three children in a house fire. It was officially established in 1948, and its first piece of equipment was a 1927 American LaFrance pumper. The station was built in 1950, with expansions in 1963 and 1993. In 1991, Ashburn Volunteer Fire Department expanded its services and added its first ambulance. In 1996, it officially became the Ashburn Volunteer Fire-Rescue Department. In 2010 Station 22, Landsdowne, was opened. AVF&R is supplemented by career staffing 7 days a week from 0600 to 1800. Station 22 also houses Safety Officer 600, since BC 601 moved to Station 24/35 in January 2014, and Station 6 houses a 24/7 career medic unit. AVFRD currently has plans and blueprints to renovate the original station 6 building. The plan currently calls for the existing station to be torn down, leaving the banquet hall "Founder's Hall" standing, and creating a new building on the old ground. Additionally, the company has plans to completely upgrade its fleet with a potential new color scheme. The process of upgrading the fleet began in early 2014, with the order of two brand new Ferrara fire engines, which will potentially highlight the possible new company color-scheme of black and yellow. Additionally, plans are in place for the order of two new ambulances, and the replacement of T606 with a Tiller truck. In late January 2014 it was announced that Engine 606C, the old Wagon, would be decommissioned and was removed from service at the beginning of February. On March 3, 2014, it was announced that the Chaplain chase vehicle had been sold to a member of the company, would have its emergency equipment removed and the unit would be taken out of service. In early 2014, Safety 600, which had recently been replaced by a new SUV of apparatus similar to the BC vehicles, was replaced with a pick-up truck with a covered bed, though still using the new color scheme. In May 2014, construction of temporary facilities on Station 6 property began, with expected demolition of the current facility and then groundbreaking for the new building to happen in June. The new station became operational in March 2016. In Summer, 2017 AVFRD took delivery of a brand new Tiller, to replace the company's Truck unit. The unit is currently going through outfitting to go in-service. Additionally, in 2017, AVFRD replaced all five ambulances, and put in service an ATV unit, to be used on the W&OD trail and for public events. In May, 2018 it was confirmed that the Shift Commander would begin running out of Station 22 over the summer. At the end of June 2018, OP600 started running out of station 22. On Wednesday 6/27/18, TT606 went in service operationally, and ran its first calls. In July, 2018 an internal memo was released stating that the Safety Officer 600 designation would be changed to instead reflect the Battalion that the unit operated in. Because of this SO600 was renamed to SO601; this may be in anticipation of additional Safety Officer's being added to operations.

- Aldie Fire and Rescue, Company 7

The Aldie Volunteer Fire Department was established in 1955 and its first piece of fire apparatus, a used 1948 GMP fire engine, was purchased for $5,500. In 1956, Co. 7 purchased its first station, which was formerly a garage and service station, and bought a 1939 Ford fire engine. In 1971, Co 7. built a new station on the same property as the old fire station. In 2010, CO. 7 began operation of a county-owned heavy rescue vehicle. Formerly Rescue 603, Rescue 607 was repainted & re-equipped to be sent to Aldie. In 2012, Aldie received a brand new heavy rescue vehicle from Pierce Manufacturing. When that unit arrived, now designated Rescue 607 and in-service, the old Rescue 607 was returned to the county for refurbishing, and is now stationed as the first county reserve rescue, Rescue 680, at the Training Center. AVF&R is in the process of trying to find ground on which to build a new Station 7. Aldie has career staff supplementation 24/7. Company 7 is earmarked to receive a new engine in 2013. Aldie received a new ambulance in January 2014. In November 2017 the county announced plans to demolish several nearby buildings to make way for the new Aldie station, but this plan has been met with objection from many local residents, who believe that it would significantly change the face of the village of Aldie, and possibly be detrimental to the area's historic character. While design work continues for the site in question, the Board of Supervisors is currently trying to locate an alternate site for the new station. In April, 2019, Station 7 received a new gator unit.

- Philomont Fire, Company 8

The Philomont Volunteer Fire Department was organized in 1955 and was equipped with a used pumper and tanker provided by other fire stations. In 1956, PVFC got its first new pumper, and in 1968 it bought a 1,500 gallon tanker. In 1975 and 1994, two expansions were added to the station, adding a meeting hall and providing a total of seven bays to house the apparatus. Philomont relies largely on career staff now, with some volunteers. Unlike many modern stations, Station 8 is a two-story building, with bays and offices on the ground floor, and kitchens, bunking and community rooms on the second. Such a layout is shared with Station 4, Station 10, and to some degree by Station 11/18. PVFC is run primarily by LCFR staffing 24/7, with several volunteers. PVFC is the only station in LCFR to operate two tankers, as well as the only one that still uses a house siren to alert volunteers. Additionally, PVFC is the only fire company that owns and operates a volunteer chase medic – ALS 608. In September 2012, CO. 8 received a brand new brush unit. In 2017 the company took over the utilization of the MAU, the wildland unit was placed permanently out of service due to an accident, and ALS 608 was placed permanently out of service. In February 2018, the Ladies Auxiliary retired, and with just four active volunteers remaining, it is likely Company 8 will disband and turn completely over to the county before the end of 2018. In the summer of 2019, Engine 608 was upgraded to have ALS capabilities and could be staffed as a Paramedic-Engine, identical to PE626 and 627.

- Arcola Fire and Rescue, Company 9

The Arcola Volunteer Fire Department was formed in 1957, formerly, and alternatively, known as Arcola-Pleasant Valley Volunteer Fire-Rescue Department. A station was built and its first piece of fire equipment, a 1,250 gal Tanker truck, was purchased through the Civil Defense for $75.00. In the 1960s, the first ambulance was put in service and the Ladies Auxiliary was formed. During Hurricane Agnes in the 1970s, 200 people were sheltered and fed at Station 9. The 1980s and 1990s saw an addition built onto the station, and a recruitment program was started to help prepare for future growth. On September 29, 2011, ground was broken for the new Brambleton Public Safety Center, which will house career/volunteer staffing from CO. 9 as well as the headquarters for the Loudoun County Fire Marshal's Office. In November 2013, the FMO moved all of its apparatus and operational staff to the new Station 9 building. AVFD is staffed 6am-6pm, 7 days a week by LCFR career staff. AVFD expects fire-rescue operations to commence from the new station 9 in April 2014. On April 3, 2014, AVFD received a brand new Tanker, which has a unique cab compared to the rest of county tankers - it was sold 1–2 years later after continued mechanical issues. In 2017 the station received the tanker transfer from station 623.

- Lucketts Fire & Rescue, Company 10—"The Nuthouse"

The Lucketts Volunteer Fire Department was established in 1960 with one fire truck and a two-bay firehouse. A few members of the community recognized the need to start a local fire company, and prior to the company's establishment, a fire truck was purchased and kept at a local farm. Dispatch called the Chief's home and his wife called local members by phone to tell them of an emergency. The fire truck was brought to the scene while members were en route. Today, Lucketts' original firehouse provides seven bays to house its apparatus. Lucketts is career staffed 24/7. Station 10 is home of the LCFR Swiftwater team, as there is easy access to the Potomac River, and White's Ferry. Station 10 is primarily LCFR career staffed, with little volunteer assistance. Lucketts received a new engine in 2014. Lucketts is the home of the county's career-staffed Swift Water Rescue team. Station 10 will be going through remodeling, or will have a brand new station built, in the near future and the county is currently looking at land parcels and will be accepting bids sometime in 2019.

- Sterling Volunteer Fire Company, Companies 11, 18, & 24

Logo of the Sterling Volunteer Fire Company.

The Sterling Park Volunteer Fire Department started in 1966 with two old, used pumpers and a tanker in a barn on Holly Ave. By 1998 they had become the Sterling Volunteer Fire Company and expanded to two stations. The station in Sterling Park, Station 11, is shared with the Sterling Volunteer Rescue Squad (as Station 15) and houses an engine, ladder tower, and a canteen unit. A second station, Station 18 (also SVRS Station 25), was built in Sugarland Run and housed a single engine. Construction of a new Station 18 (and 25) in Cascades was completed in 1997. The Cascades station houses an engine and tanker. The old station 18 is used by the Loudoun County Sheriff's Office. On Saturday, Nov 9th, 2013, Station 24 (also SVRS Station 35) officially opened along Route 28 near the Dulles Town Center. The station houses an engine, quint, and Battalion Chief 601. Stations 11 and 18 are career staffed daily from 6 am – 6 pm, and volunteer staffed from 6 pm – 6 am. Station 24 has 24/7 career staffing, supplemented by volunteers. In the 2020 County Budget, additional staffing was proposed to move to a 7/12 career schedule at Stations 11 and 18, and to add an additional career member to the 24/7 staffing at Station 24.

- Lovettsville Fire & Rescue, Company 12 "The Border Patrol"

The Lovettsville Rescue Squad received its charter in 1966. In 1967, a fire company was begun and combined with the rescue squad to form one company in 1968. The current building was erected in 1974 and has had two subsequent additions built. It has split operations between career and volunteers – with career staffing during weekdays from 0600 to 1800. LVFR recently received a brand new Wagon, to replace their older model Wagon 612. LVF&R hopes to begin construction of a new station within the next few years.

- Loudoun County Volunteer Rescue Squad (Leesburg), Company 13

On September 12, 1952, 12 men throughout the county started the first rescue squad in Loudoun County, the Loudoun County Volunteer Rescue Squad. Until funds could be raised to purchase their own vehicle, Albert Laycock donated his Ford Ranch Wagon for their first response unit. The first official squad vehicle purchased was a '51 Chevrolet truck with a utility bed made to carry patients. Over the years, units were housed in Purcellville, Hamilton and Leesburg until other squads could be formed. The squad building on Catoctin Circle was constructed in 1975. One paramedic unit from Company 13 receives career supplementation during the day from 0600 to 1800, and one paramedic unit is staffed 24/7 by career personnel. In August 2015, due to long staffing problems, LCVRS relinquished their Heavy Rescue Squad, which will be reassigned to Station 20 and operated 24/7 by career personnel.

- Purcellville Public Safety Center, Purcellville Volunteer Rescue Squad, Company 14—"The Mainstreet Medics"

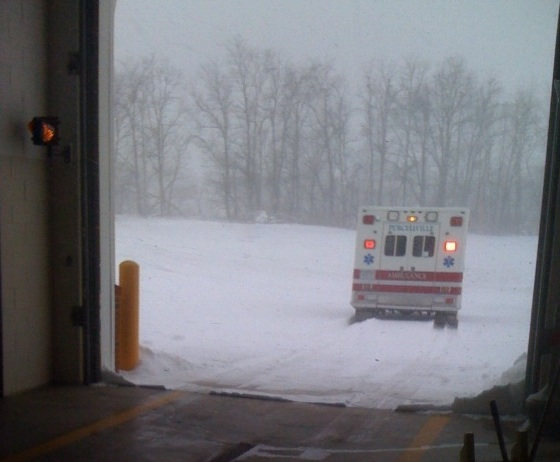
Ambulance 614-2 responding to a call during the February 5–6, 2010 blizzard

The Purcellville Volunteer Rescue Squad has been in existence since 1969. PVRS currently boasts three ambulances, a Basic Life Support chase vehicle (similar in function to a SERV), an Advanced Life Support chase vehicle, and a second ALS chase vehicle on loan from the county (ALS 680). CO. 14 is also the home of the Mass Casualty Support Unit, on loan from LCFR (note: the text on the vehicle's side reads "Medical Care Support Unit", though it is still referenced & dispatched as the Mass Casualty Support Unit). Having moved into a brand new facility in the summer of 2009, shared with PVFC CO. 2, PVRS maintains an all-volunteer rescue squad and is the only fire or rescue company in LC-CFRS to maintain 24/7 volunteer staffing. In 2012, ALS 690 was stationed at PVRS for company ALS use, but was then shortly replaced by ALS 680, which reflected the new county paint scheme for smaller vehicles and following the new county policy of using the '680' series of designators for county reserve units. PVRS received ALS 680 on Friday 3/1/2013, a larger ALS chase than ALS 690, which exemplified the new county color scheme for chase vehicles, of base red with tan and white striping, and yellow/red chevrons on the back of the vehicle. This piece is used by the ALS volunteers of PVRS and as a replacement, when needed, for ALS 601 by career staff. As of October 2014, ALS 680 is no longer stationed at company 14. On April 2, 2014, PVRS received a brand new ambulance to replace A614, the oldest unit with that company. This ambulance is similar to A614-B, and is the first Purcellville-owned unit (as opposed to MSCU 614), to reflect the recent county FRG that all new apparatus must have chevrons. In Summer 2015, PVRS received a brand new ALS chase unit, to supplement their existing ALS chase. In May 2018 it was confirmed that the new EMS602 would begin operations of Station 14 over the summer. This will be the first 24/7 career staffed unit out of this station. EMS602 went into service at the end of June 2018. There is additionally discussion to relocate MSCU614 to another station.

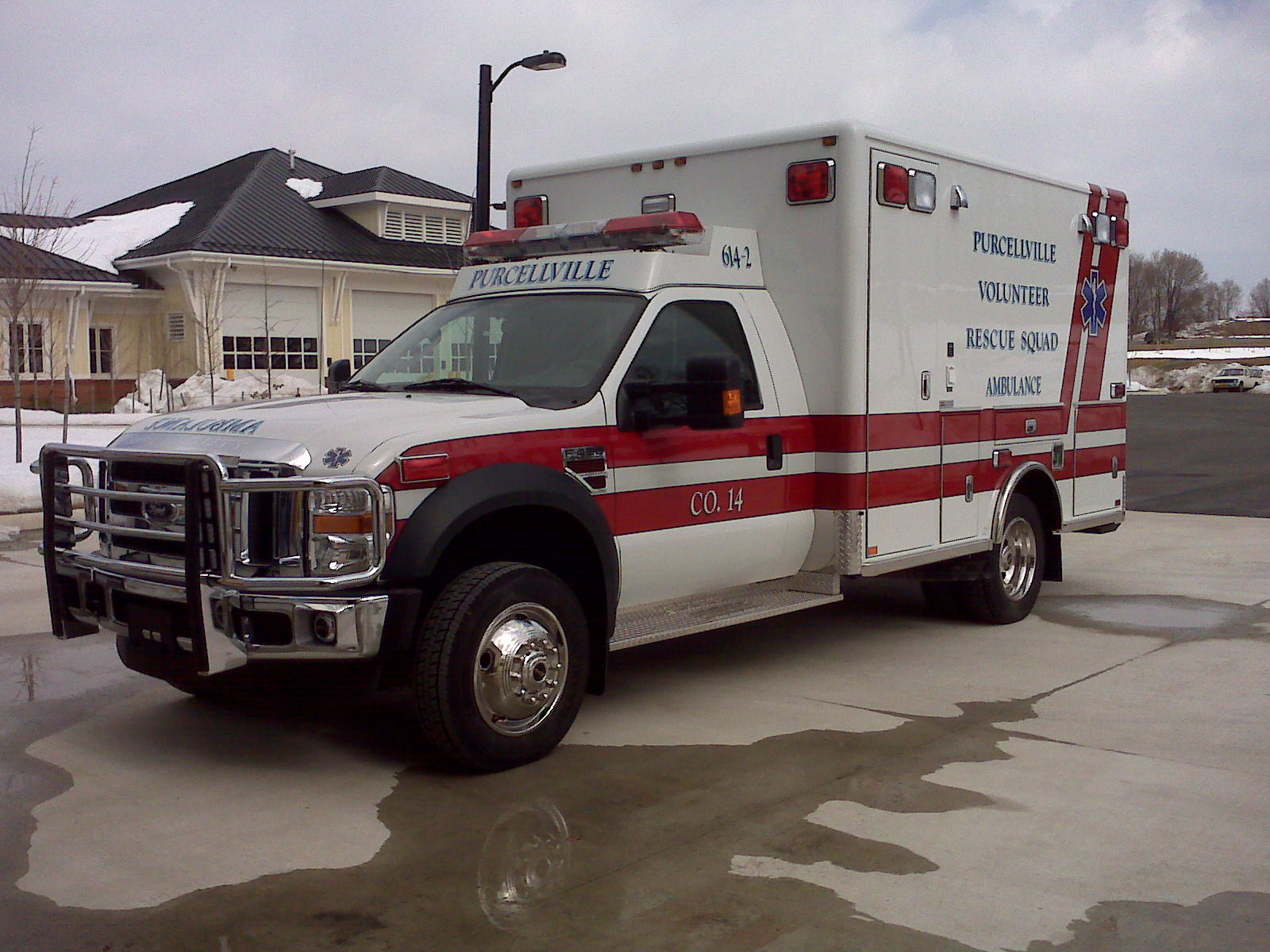
Brand new Ambulance 614–2 at the Purcellville Public Safety Center

- Sterling Volunteer Rescue Squad, Companies 15, 25, & 35

Founded in 1964, the Sterling Volunteer Rescue Squad was created as a "Jaycees" project in a newly developed planned community in Eastern Loudoun County, following a tragic pedestrian accident in which bystanders had to wait for an ambulance from Loudoun Rescue, which was then headquartered in Hamilton, Virginia. The first station was co-located with the Library in the 200 block of N. Sterling Blvd, in 1968 a crash truck was purchased under a highway safety grant, that unit (Sterling 1) was housed at the Shell gas station in Sterling Park. A year earlier the membership of Sterling Rescue would be active in forming the Sterling Vol. Fire Company. In the early 1970s, both Sterling Rescue and the Sterling Fire Company would work together to build its first station to house both organizations in Sterling Park. Both organizations continue to be independent corporations, co-located in the same stations. Later, that same decade, Sterling Rescue would be instrumental in implementing Advance Life Support care within the Loudoun County system.

Recognizing response delays and an increasing call volume in the communities north of Route 7, now known as Potomac Falls, members living in that area would respond to emergencies in an old ambulance parked in their driveway. Later a substation was built to provide an area to garage the ambulance in the Sugarland community. In December 1997 the substation was replaced with a larger station which was built in the Cascades community. The Sugarland facility still remains but is used for the storage of equipment and supplies, houses the department's Special Events Team and is used by the Loudoun County Sheriff's Office for their community policing activities.

Sterling Rescue provides both emergency medical care and transport (ALS/BLS), and rescue operations throughout Eastern Loudoun County and the region. Sterling Rescue is home of one of Virginia's Office of EMS's, Disaster Task Force (NOVA TF-8) which has been deployed on several events throughout the Commonwealth. Sterling Rescue has received recognition for its contributions by the Loudoun County government, Northern Virginia EMS Council, Virginia Office of EMS, recipient of the "1999 Governor's Award for Agency of the Year", and EMS Magazine's "2006 Best Volunteer EMS Agency".

In 2012, Sterling Rescue had over 7100 responses, and its 200 volunteer members, staffing both stations, provided over 121,000 hours of time to the community. To meet an ever-increasing demand on services, plans are underway for the construction of a third station along Rt. 28 in the area of Dulles Towncenter Mall, and it is expected to be open in 2013. Ground was broken for the new station, in Kincora on Route 28/7, on March 1, 2012.

On May 29, 2013, SVRS unveiled its new Medical Care Support Unit, a medical supply truck in the vein of the MCSU operated by PVRS. The MSU is a 2005 E450 box truck which was a delivery truck before being purchased by SVRS and re-outfitted. The unit is labeled as MSU-615 in the field.

On Saturday, November 9, 2013, Station 24/35 officially opened, housing two ambulances, a utility truck, the MSU, and a bike team. The opening of the station marks a new era in the history of SVRS, as LCFR career personnel will begin operating SVRS vehicles for the first time, only at station 35, on a 7/12 basis, 6 am – 6 pm. This means that SVRS will no longer be 100% volunteer operated, even though the majority of their operations for the time being remain volunteer, and all vehicles company-owned, leaving only Purcellville Rescue as the only 100% volunteer company in the county.

The 2020 County Budget including proposals for 7/12 career staffing for Rescue 615, which would be transferred to Station 24/35, and re-labeled to Rescue 635. This would make R635 the second most-staffed rescue in the county, next to R620, as R607 and R617 are not fully staffed, but are cross-staffed.

- Neersville Fire & Rescue, Company 16—"The Outpost" (DISBANDED) / LCFR Loudoun Heights, Station 26

Neersville Volunteer Fire and Rescue began in 1976 as a sub-station of Round Hill. It housed a borrowed ambulance in a neighbor's driveway until the community members built its community building to house the ambulance. Two years later it became the Neersville Volunteer Rescue Squad, and in July 1979 it became Neersville Volunteer Fire and Rescue Company. Neersville relies primarily on 24/7 career staff now, with very few volunteers. Neersville has recently had difficulty maintaining volunteer support, to the extent that the company lost its license to carry patients as a volunteer company. However, with an incremental increase in membership, the company is petitioning to rejoin the county system and rebuild itself. Neersville remains in need of volunteers. Construction of a new Western Loudoun station, to replace Station 16, which is in significant need of repair, has begun – there are concerns that the construction of this new building will force out Neersville Fire & Rescue, the smallest volunteer fire and rescue organization within LC-CFRS, leading to their cessation as an organization. On February 6, 2013, the Loudoun County Board of Supervisors voted to revoke Neersville Volunteer Fire & Rescue's charter, following a long history of contention between the two organizations and a recommendation to dissolve the company by a Government Reform Commission. This has been reported to be a controversial decision, as proponents state that adequate research was done, while company and area volunteers state they were never consulted for a fair decision. The effects of this vote will reportedly take a while to finalize, as several of the vehicles and property are still held by NVFR, though it is believed that not only will the company's charter be revoked, but the company number will not be used in the future. In 2013 the company's charter was revoked, disbanding Company 16; leaving matters of company-owned apparatus, and privately held finances to be finalized. Operations will be continued by LCFR. As LCFR is constructing a new station, the area of Neersville will be covered by the Western Loudoun station, provided by 24/7 career staffing only. Neersville will be receiving a new tanker and a new brush truck sometime in 2013, with the engine up for replacement as well. The county received the new tanker that will replace Tanker 616. However, it is being held until the new station at Loudoun Heights is operational, at which time Neersville 16 will be retired, and operations will be conducted under Loudoun Heights 26, which the tanker reflects. Loudoun Heights is receiving a new brush, ambulance, and tanker in 2014. In 2015, Loudoun Heights Station 26 became operational. In Fall 2017 the county completed a 2-year pilot study on the utilization of a Paramedic Engine (the county's first such program) - the pilot was deemed a success and PE626 will be a permanent unit.

- Hamilton Rescue, Company 17

Establishing its roots in 1952 as Loudoun County's first rescue squad, the members of the Hamilton community were volunteering their time and skills long before Station 17 was renamed in 1979. The Hamilton Volunteer Rescue Squad serves the town of Hamilton and its surrounding areas, including Paeonian Springs and Waterford, and are the "second due" units in Purcellville and Leesburg. In addition to BLS & ALS operations, Company 17 also utilizes a boat unit, a heavy rescue unit (Rescue 617), and a bike team. These specialty units are staffed primarily by the HVRS Special Operations Division. Company 17 is supplemented by career staffing during the day, who also operate the county chase unit ALS601 – career personnel put in service a medic unit which operates within the first due, or as the ALS chase for non-first due calls. Hamilton received a new ambulance in October 2013, A617C, which being county-owned, deviates from the green color scheme of HVRS, and is red, following county colors. A617C is the primary response unit when LCFR Career Staff are on duty. A617 and A617B are owned and primarily operated by the volunteers of Hamilton Rescue. HVRS also received a Utility unit in late December 2013, also to be operated by the HVRS Special Operations. In a March 2018 inter-department memo, it was announced that HVRS had decommissioned its swiftwater rescue team.

- LCFR Dulles South Public Safety Center, Station 19-"The Big Top"

Constructed by the county, it houses both Fire-Rescue and a Sheriff's substation. It began operation on May 7, 2007, with a grand opening in June 2007. The station is staffed 24/7 by LCFR staff with no volunteer participation. The county Hazardous Materials response team, which includes a large primary response unit and multiple support units and trailers, is stationed here. Station 19 received a new engine in the spring of 2013. As of 2017, the haz-mat team is in the process of planning out the purchase of replacement vehicles. Station 19 is expecting delivery a brand new HazMat unit, and a hazmat support unit, in Spring, 2018.

- Mt. Weather Fire and Rescue, Company 21

Maintained by all-career staff, this company watches over the Mt. Weather area in the Blue Ridge Mountains and the Federal Emergency Management Agency's Mount Weather Emergency Operations Center. Company 21 is only considered a LC-CFRS company for operational planning purposes, as the staffing is maintained by FEMA. To respond to mutual aid calls, the units must be released by FEMA prior to response. Used primarily by LC-CFRS for station fills in the western end of the county, such as Purcellville or Round Hill. Likewise, some LC-CFRS units can be used to staff Mt. Weather – however, visiting units are primarily confined to the fire station and are chaperoned at all times. Mt. Weather received a brand new engine in June 2014.

- LCFR Moorefield, Station 23-"The Warehouse Rats"

Originally the second Ashburn station, Loudoun County took over when Ashburn Fire & Rescue moved into the new Landsdowne station 22. Originally stationed at the Red Rum Drive warehouse facility, LCFR opened a brand new station 23 in Moorefield in August 2011. It is the second all-career station in the county. This station housed several specialty apparatus, including the Mobile Air Unit, used for SCBA cylinder refilling on significant incidents, and the ambulance bus. Moorefield received a second Ambulance in 2014. In 2016-2017 the MAU was transferred to Station 608. In 2017 the Tanker was transferred to Station 609. The station is currently the home of an engine, medic, ambulance, MAB, and EMS Supervisor.

- LCFR Kirkpatrick Farms, Station 27

Construction is currently ongoing for the county's newest station in the Kirkpatrick Farms area south of Rt 50. The station is scheduled to open in Spring 2018 and will have a Paramedic Engine (the county's 2nd), Tanker, and Ambulance. An internal memo in Spring, 2018 stated that after completion of a pilot Advanced EMT Program, Station 27 would be the first in the region to utilize the entry-level ALS certification. In July 2018, Loudoun County announced that construction on Station 27 had been halted and that the contractor had been fired due to delays, despite the facility being ~90% complete. The county announced that it would be working to hire a new contractor, but that the facility was now not scheduled to be open until the end of 2019, despite an original March 2018 scheduled opening. The County stated that the ~35 operational staff who were scheduled to be assigned there, including new hires, would be assigned to other staffing holes within the county, until the station opens. In April 2019, construction finished and the county assumed possession of the facility and grounds in order to begin moving in equipment, with no go-live date as of yet announced.

- LCFR Leesburg South, Station 28

Station 28 is a planned station that is under development, tentatively titled "Leesburg South" This station will house a engine, medic, tanker and, the County hazmat unit

- Loudoun County Training Center (Leesburg), Station 90/99 & Red Rum Drive Warehouse

LCFR Training Center 690

The Training Center for LC-CFRS — nicknamed "The Rock". This facility has many classrooms and lecture halls, the High Bay (houses the Rock's gym, and several apparatus, and encompasses a four-story building for training), and the Burn and Extrication Pads for training. Many training & reserve apparatus, such as Engines 690,91,98,99, Truck 690, and multiple ambulances are stationed here when not in the field running as a reserve unit. Additionally, several career vehicles are stationed here, such as senior officer's chase vehicles, reserve BC/Safety Officer/EMS Supervisor chase vehicles, Bus 690 for training events, and more. Additionally, new units often come through the Rock for outfitting before being transferred to their home station. Reserve Rescue 680 alternates being stationed between here and the Warehouse. There are many reserve and field units that are stationed at either headquarters or Red Rum, and as the units are rotated in and out of the field, it can be very difficult to keep track of the complete roster of units.

LC-CFRS also maintains additional apparatus and equipment storage at the Red Rum Drive Warehouse in Ashburn, VA. The warehouse is now the home for many reserve, specialty, and FMO apparatus as well as fleet maintenance operations.

LC-CFRS Training Center is across the road from the Leesburg Airport, between the National Guard Armory and the Adult Detention Center of the Loudoun County Sheriff's Office. After a recent move, there are additional department offices just north of the airport, which will become the home of many LCFR management, including the ECC – ostensibly leaving the entirety of the current training center for only training, as opposed to combined headquarters and training. In 2015, discussions began about the possibility of installing a small station at the training center, primarily to house senior-level operations personnel and some specialty apparatus, though not to replace the proposed Leesburg South station.

== Dispatch ==
The Loudoun County Emergency Communications Center serves as the county's public safety answering point for fire, rescue and police incidents, using the county's Enhanced-911 (E-911) system. The center operates 24 hours a day. Emergency and non-emergency fire and rescue calls are processed and police-related calls are transferred to the appropriate law enforcement agency. Each shift includes workers who are certified in various aspects of emergency medical dispatch and who meet the standards set by the national Association of Public Communications Officers.

When a member of the public dials "911" they speak with an LCFR 911 operator who assigns the call to where it needs to go based on the information provided.

- If it is police-related, the information is sent to the Loudoun County Sheriff Office radio dispatcher for the precinct or special unit concerned, or to local Police Departments.
- If it is near a major airport the Metropolitan Washington Airports Authority is notified.
- If it is a fire, hazmat, rescue or EMS incident, the LCFR 911 operator will directly dispatch the call information to the appropriate units

=== Box numbers ===
Each address in the city is assigned a box number, based on the closest street, special building or highway box. This gives the companies en route cross streets for the alarm. If there is also a street address given to the dispatchers, the responding apparatus will get this information in the firehouse, over the air, and via their mobile data terminals (computer aided dispatch – CAD) in the apparatus. At present, there are several thousand physical street boxes in Loudoun County, with many additional special building boxes and highway boxes, as well as "dummy boxes" used for special response assignments. In addition, there are airport crash boxes for Washington Dulles International Airport and other airports. When either box is sounded it brings an automatic second alarm (2-2) response of equipment, along with various special units.

=== Critical Information Dispatch System ===
Critical Information Dispatch System (CIDS, pronounced "sids") information is transmitted to units in the firehouse and en route is information that is collected on a building during inspections and by public input, which would affect fire-fighting operations. Such things as:

- warehoused apartments,
- type and length of line stretch (or hose),
- number of apartments per floor,
- unsafe conditions, standpipe conditions, and other information

This information is relayed via dispatcher and MDT while units are en route, allowing incoming units to develop operations plans prior to arriving on scene.

== Gallery ==
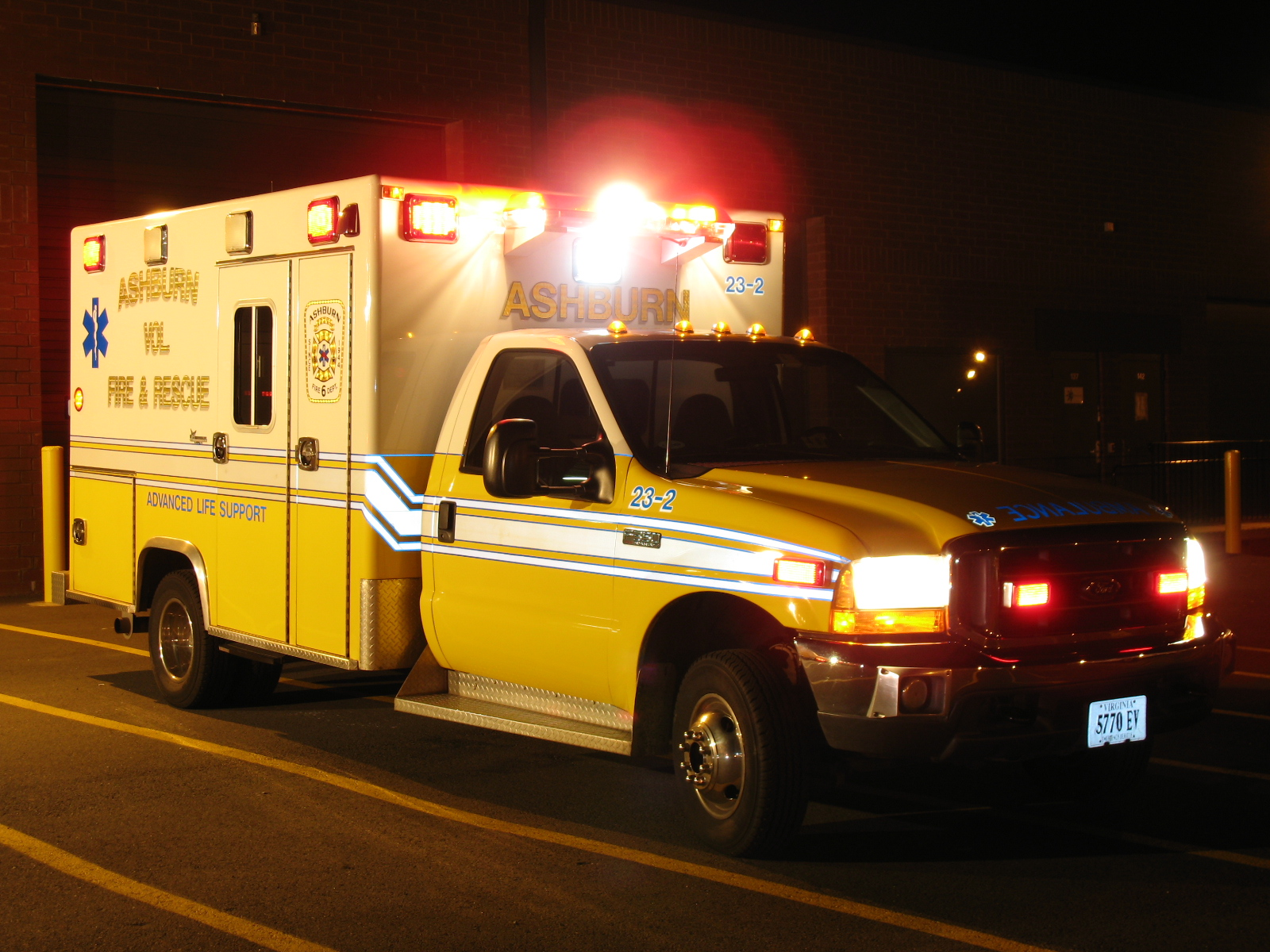
Old Ambulance 623–2, Ashburn – prior to transfer to Station 22 and COG unit name changes

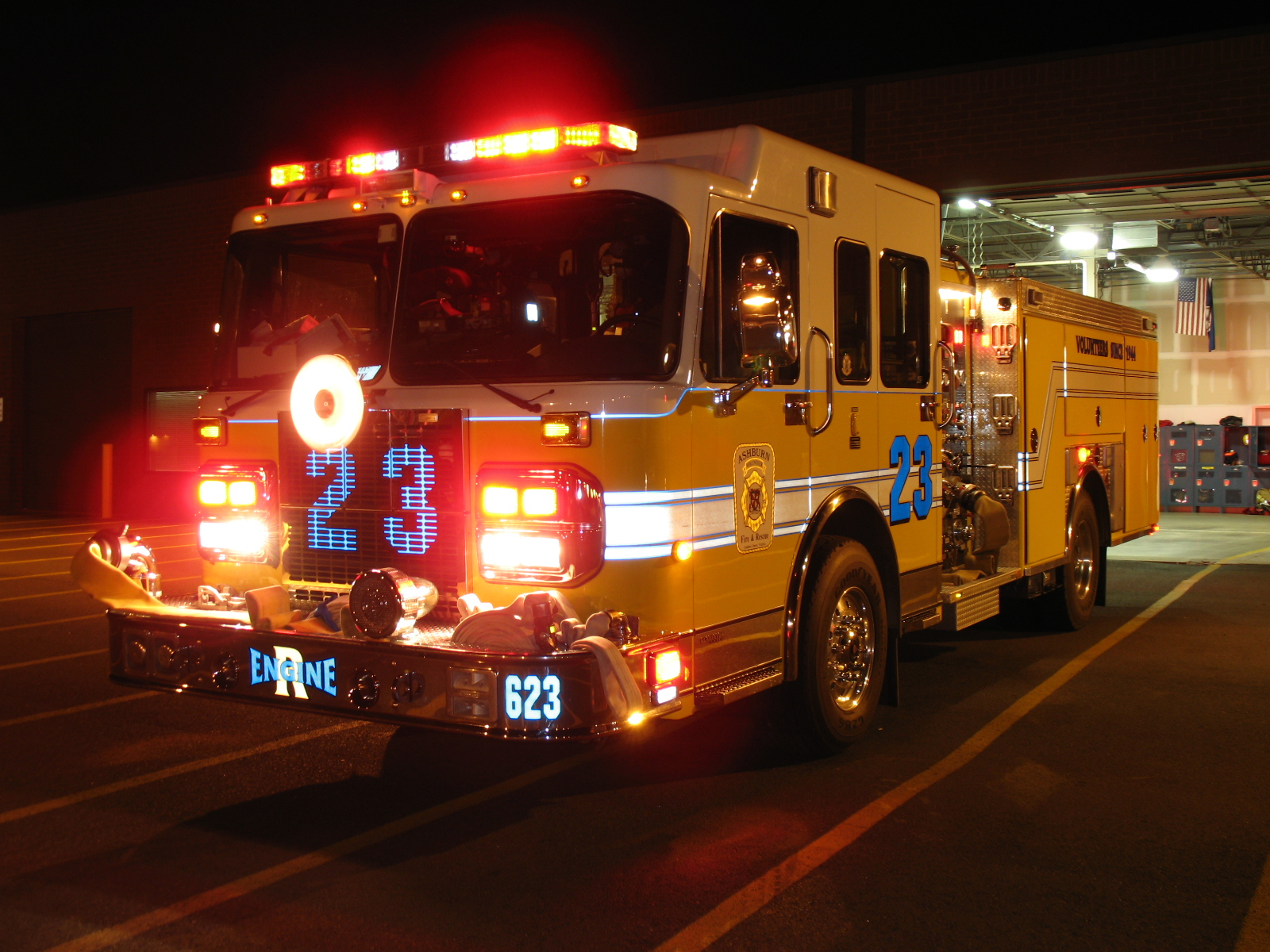
Old Reserve Engine 623, Ashburn – prior to transfer to Station 22 and COG unit name changes

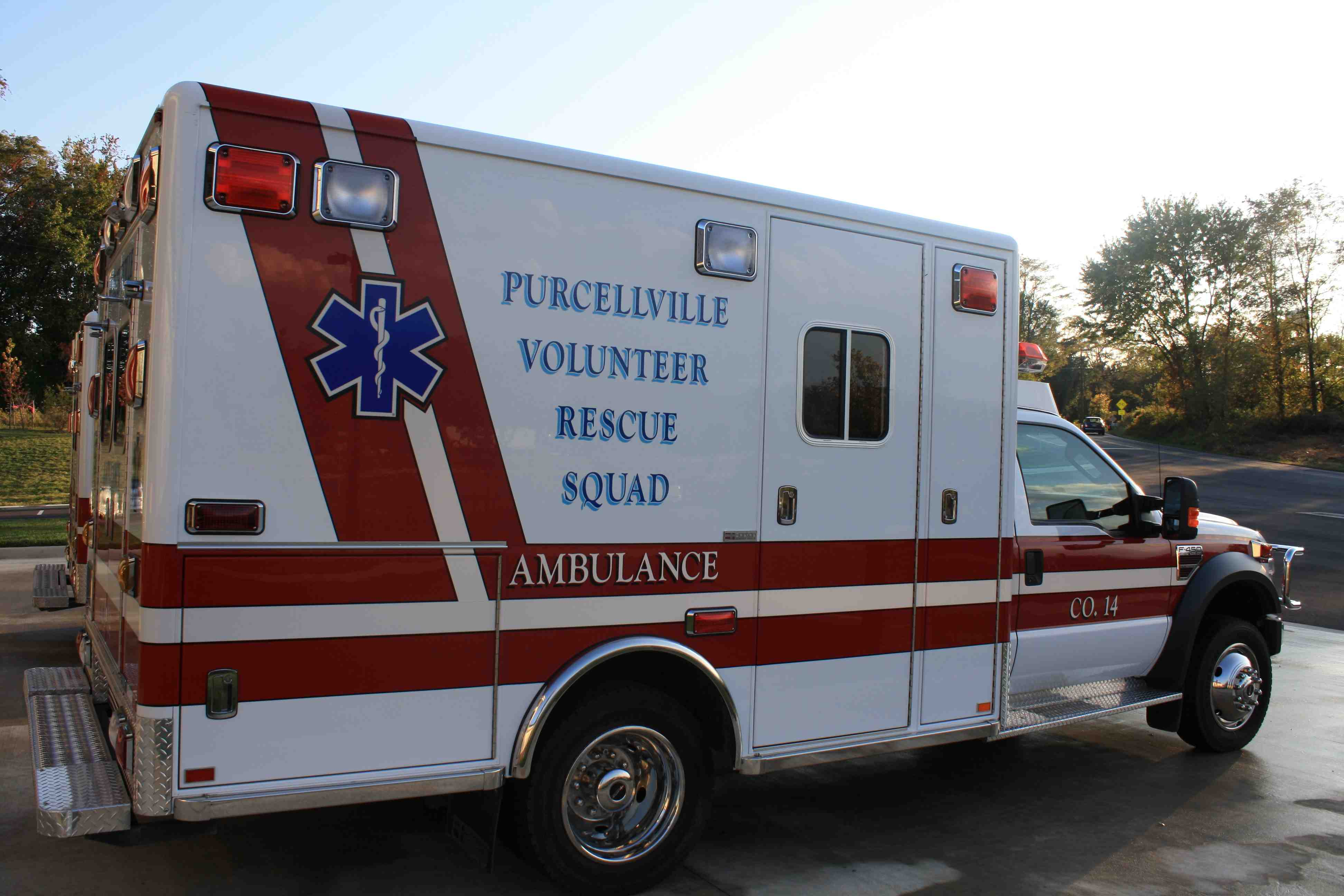
Ambulance 614C, Purcellville

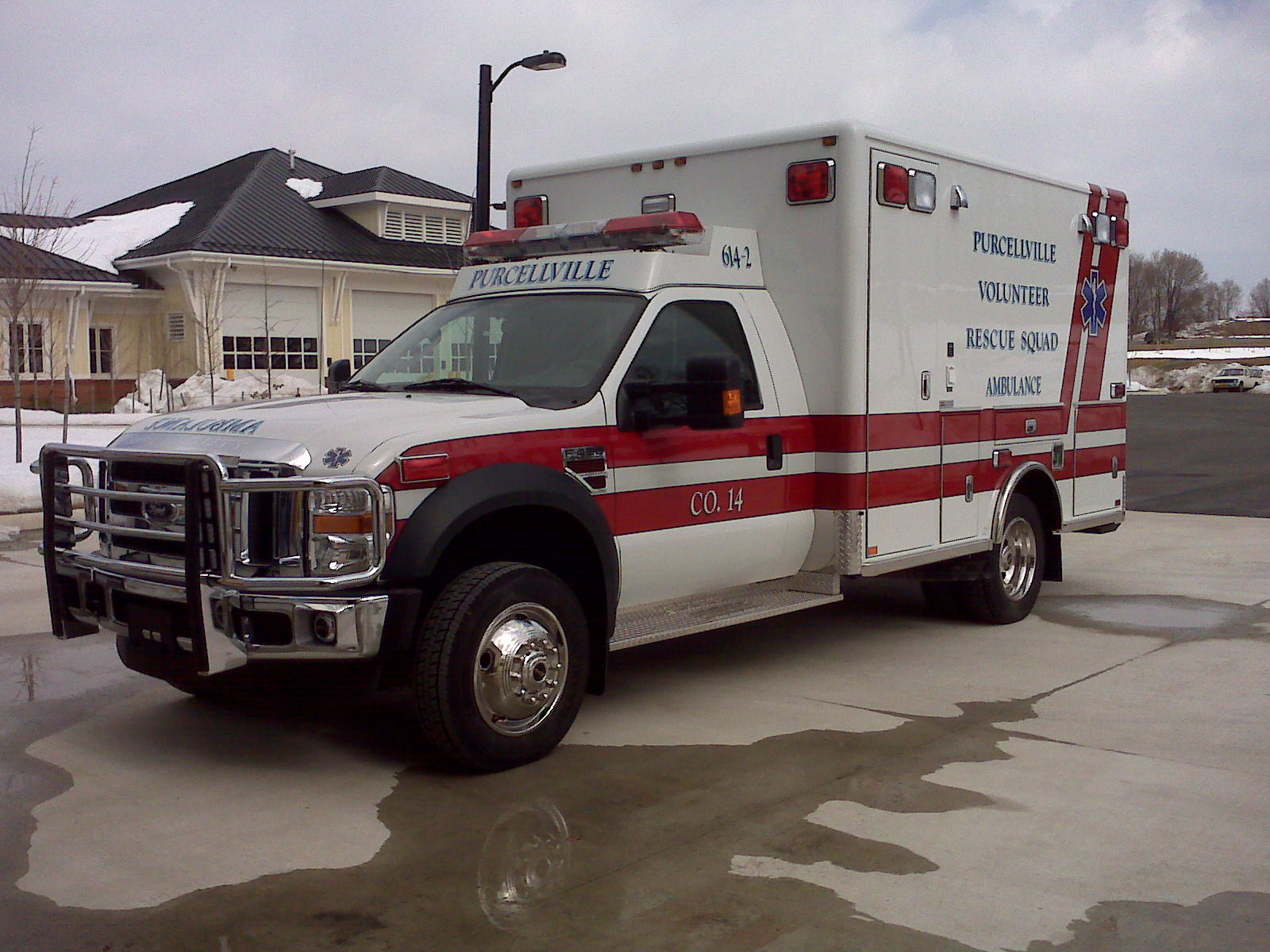
Ambulance 614B, Purcellville

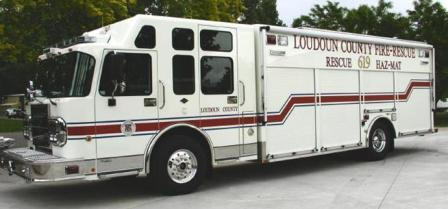
LCFR HazMat 619, Dulles South – prior to repainting

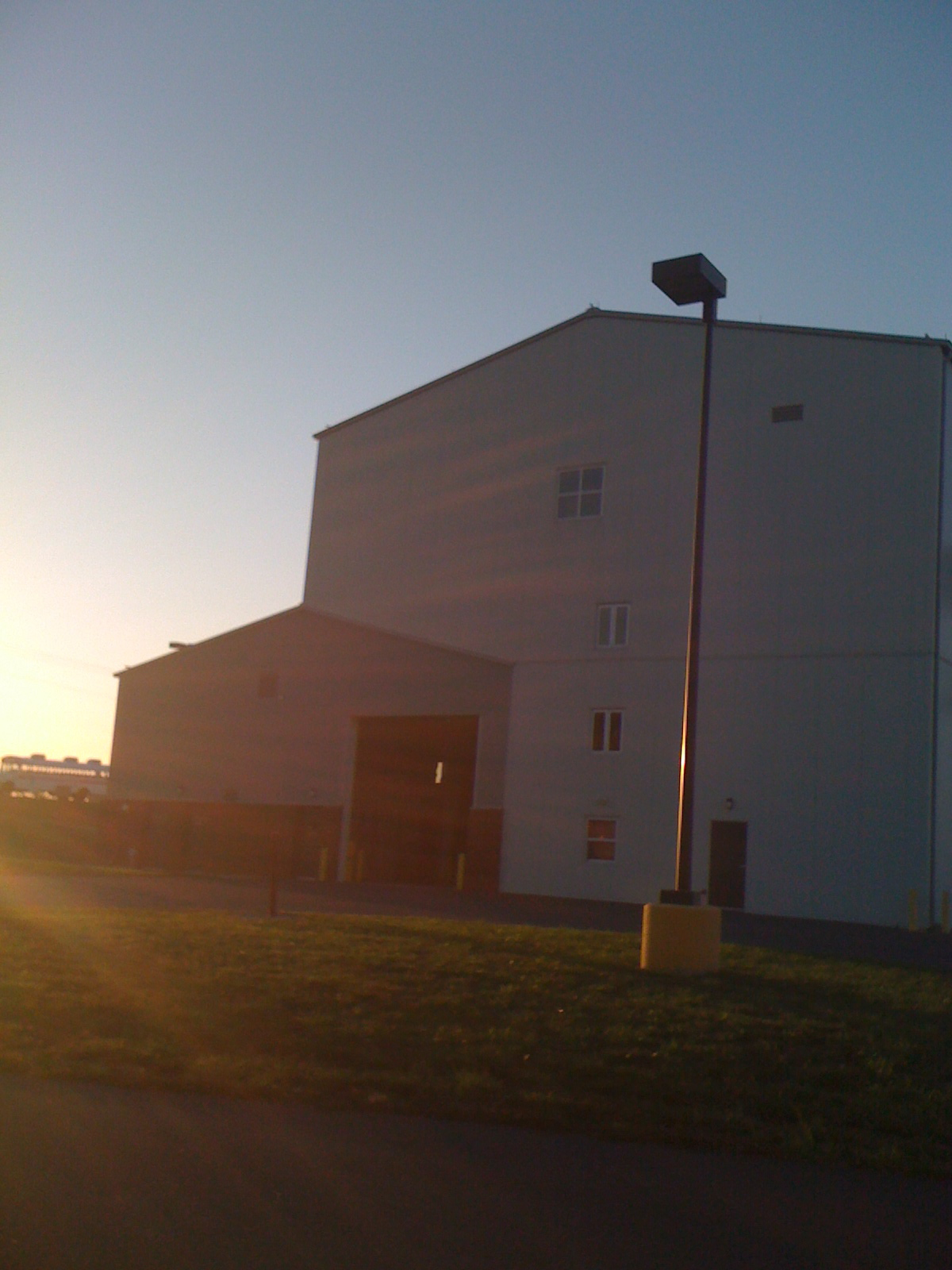
North side of the High Bay at the Training Center

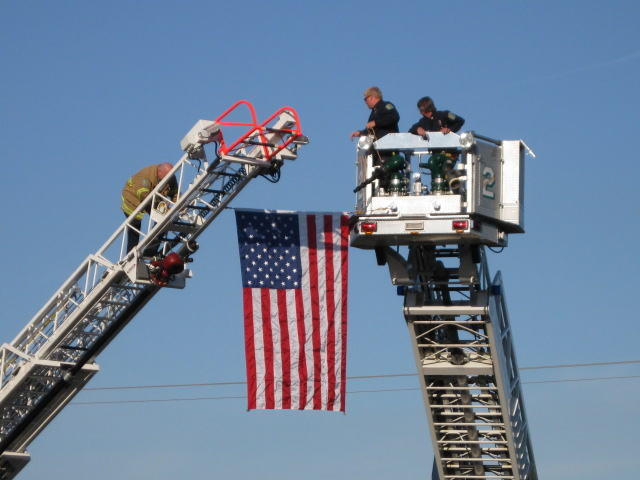
Tower 602 & Truck 690 perform a flag arch

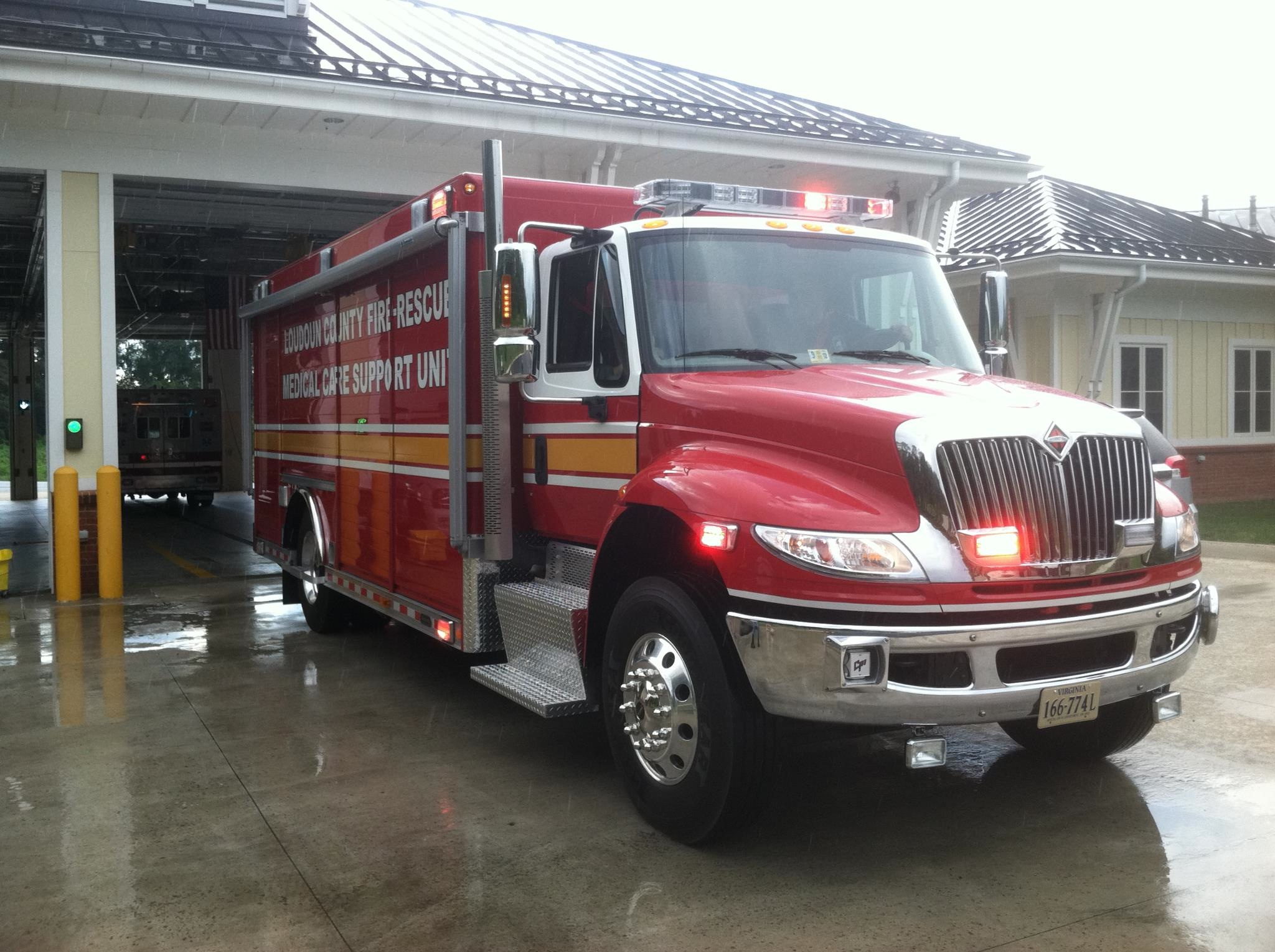
MCSU 614, Purcellville

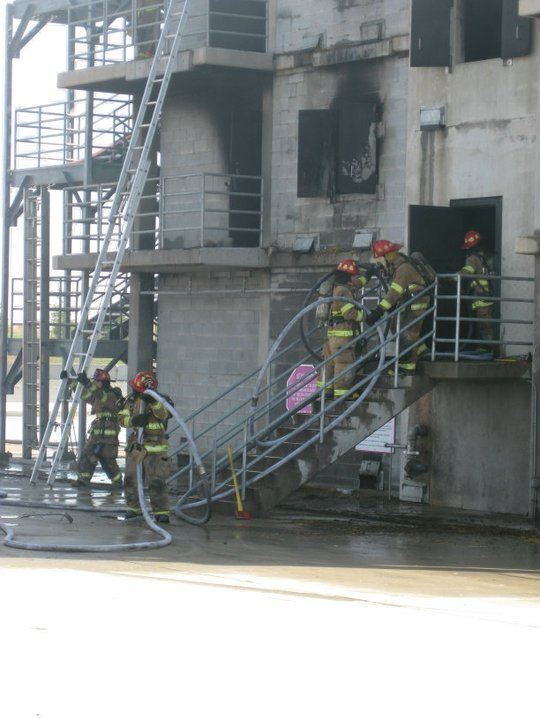
Volunteer Fireschool drills at the Burn Building

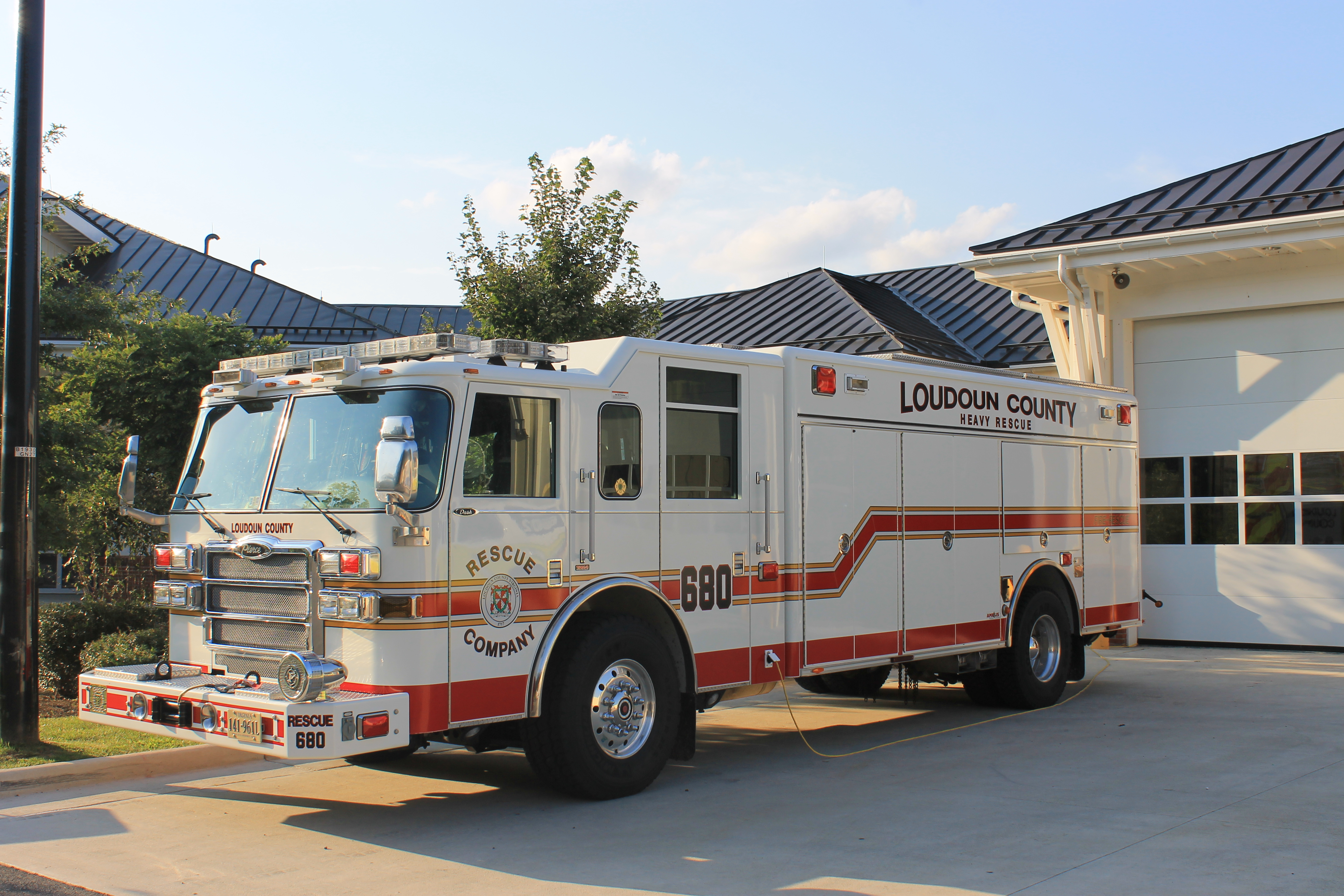
Reserve Rescue 680

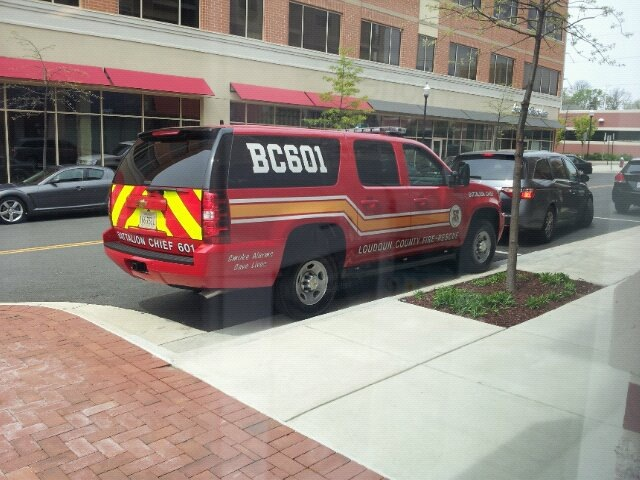
Prior Battalion Chief 601 vehicle

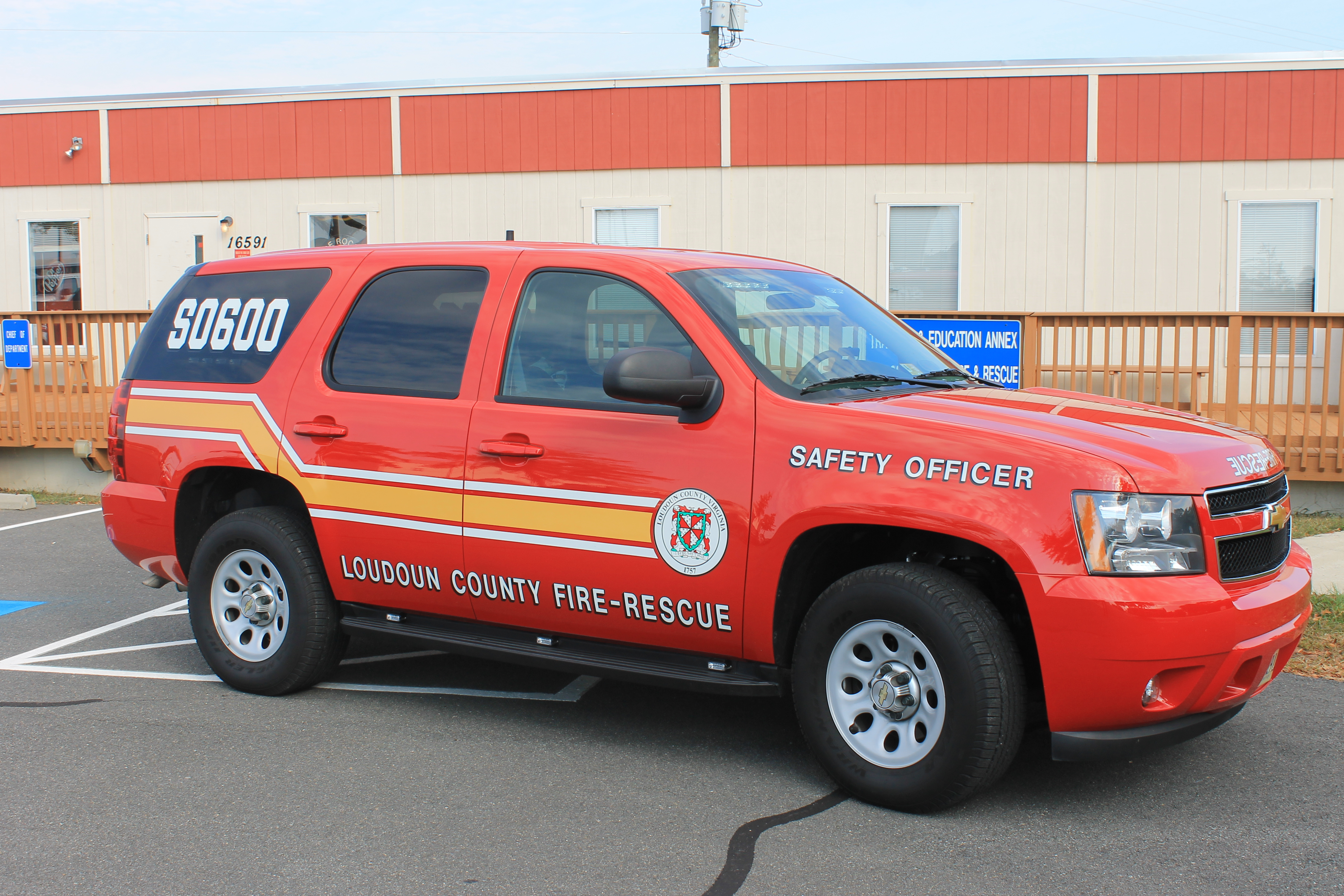
Prior Safety Officer 600 vehicle

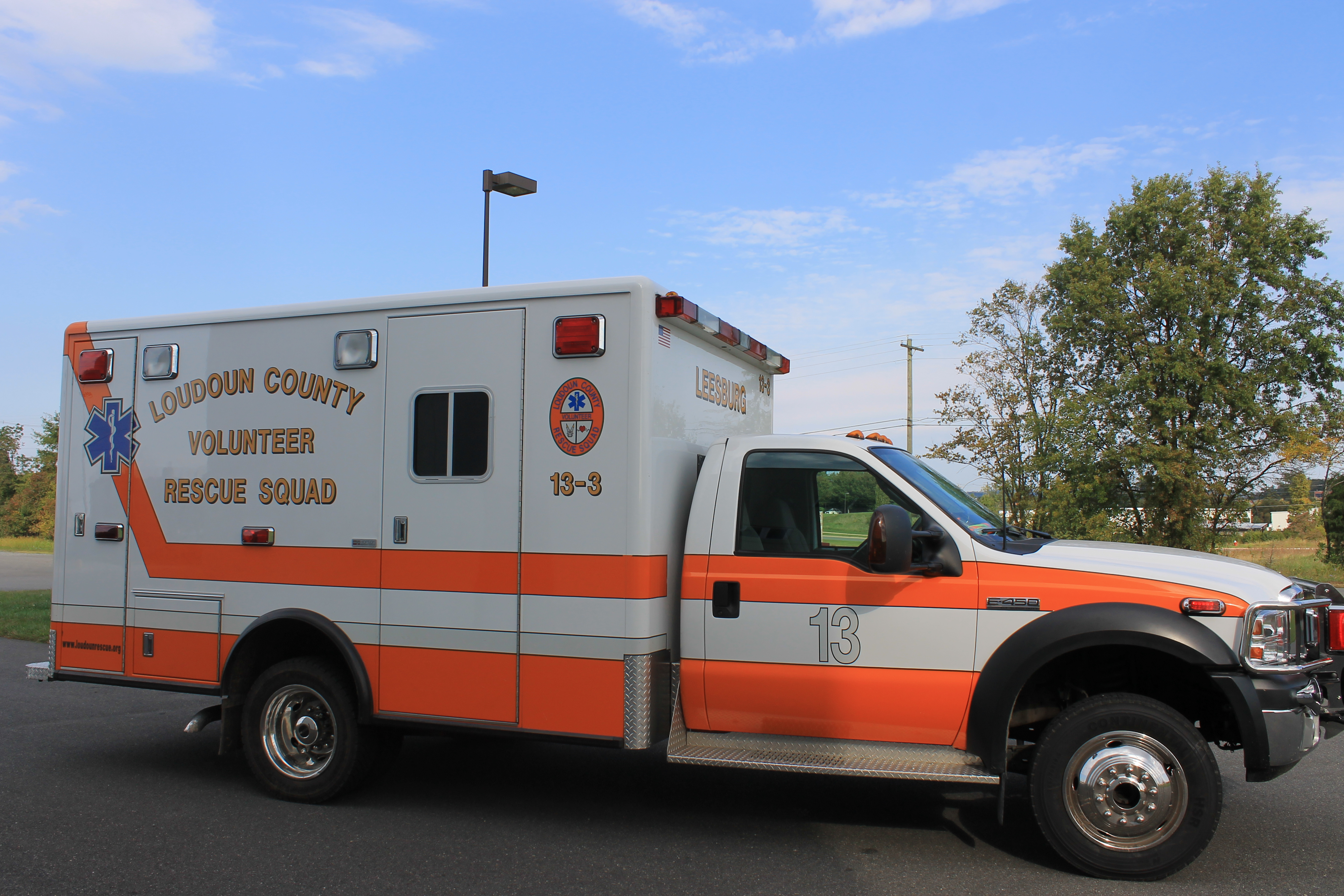
Ambulance 613C, Leesburg

== Affiliations ==
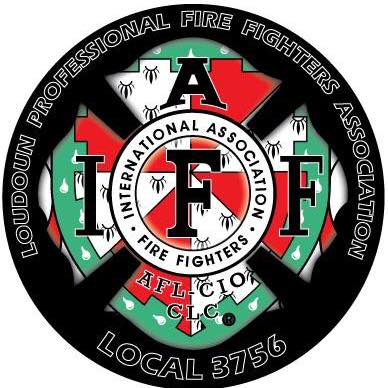
Local 3756 Logo

=== IAFF Local 3756 ===
LCFR career personnel are represented by International Association of Fire Fighters Local 3756. The chapter was chartered in 1997, and now has over 500 members, with representation across all shifts, divisions, battalions, and many ranks.

=== Virginia Task Force 1 ===
Several members of the LC-CFRS system are also members of Urban Search and Rescue Virginia Task Force 1, a part of the Fairfax County Fire and Rescue Department.
