= Kincora =

Kincora may refer to:

- Kincora, Calgary, Canada
- Kincora, Queensland, Australia
- Kincora, Virginia, a census-designated place in Loudoun County
- Kincora Boys' Home, Belfast, Northern Ireland
- Kincora (Ceann Coradh), the birthplace of Irish King Brian Boru in modern-day Killaloe, County Clare
