= Rescue vehicle =

Specialized vehicle with technical life saving equipment

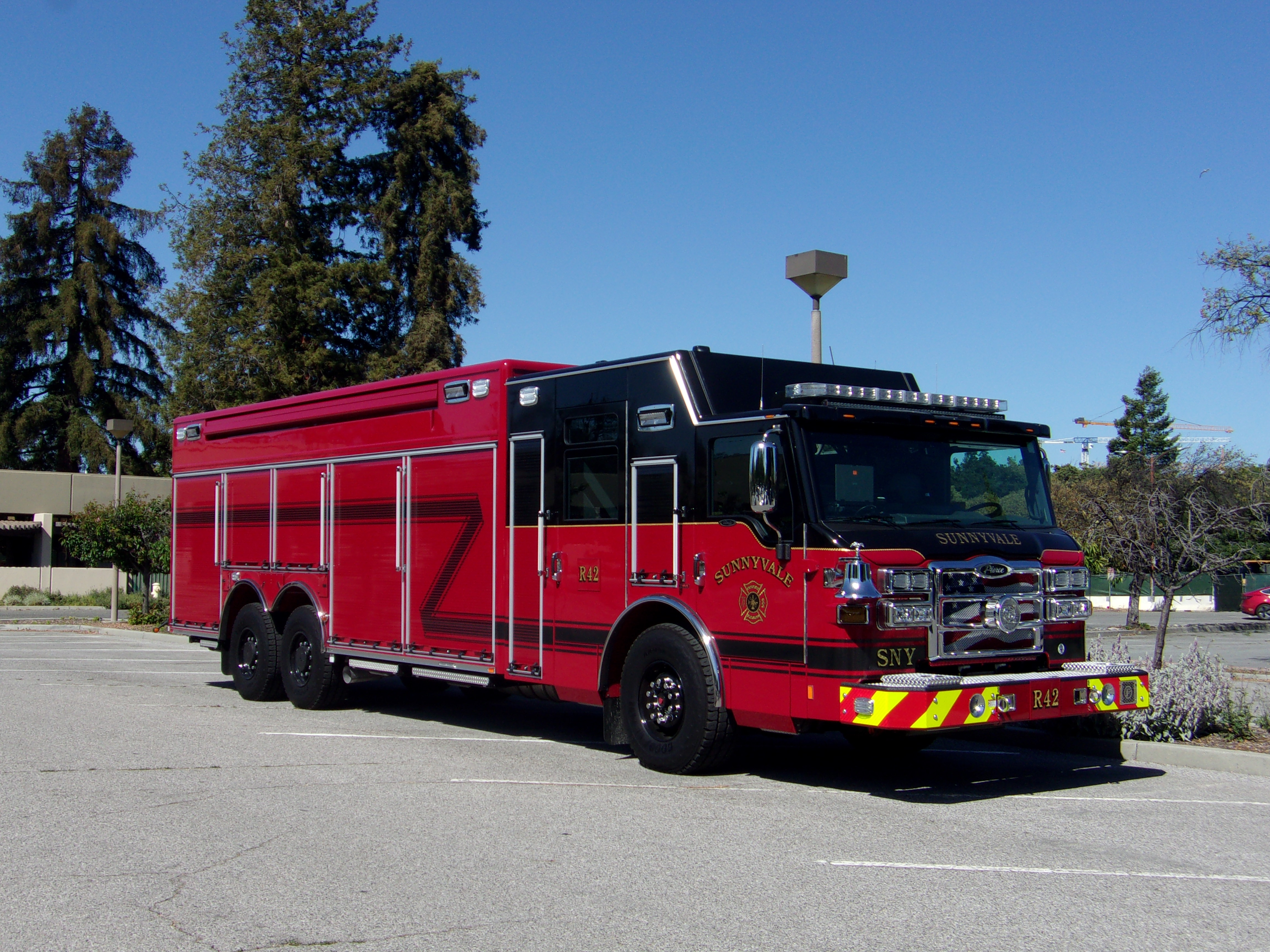
Sunnyvale Fire Department Rescue 42 Pierce Enforcer

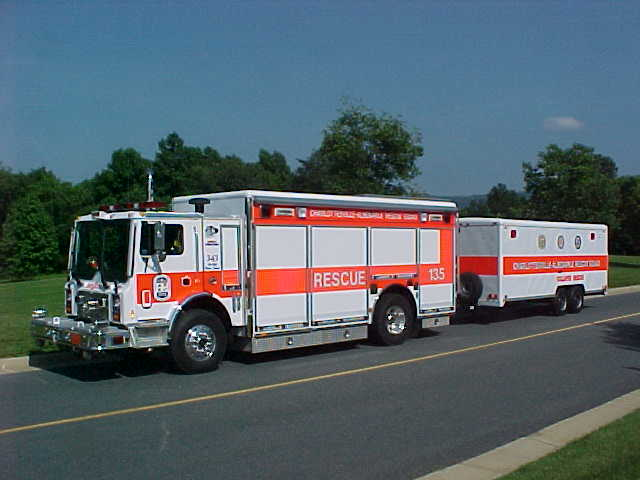
Charlottesville-Albemarle Rescue Squad's technical rescue vehicle

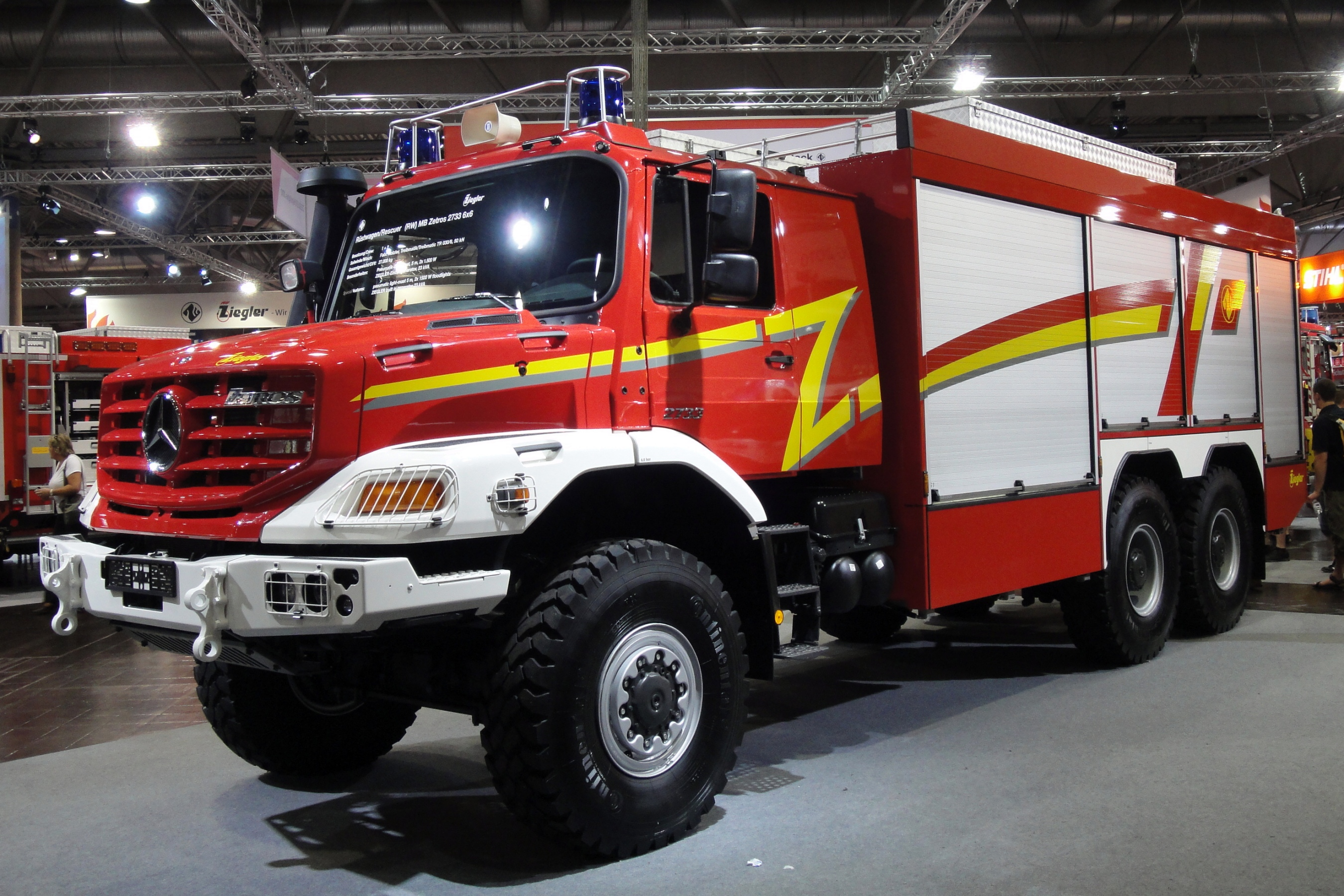
A Mercedes-Benz Zetros for the German fire services

A rescue vehicle is a specialized vehicle that is designed to transport and provide the equipment necessary for technical rescue. Rescue vehicles carry an array of special equipment such as the jaws of life, wooden cribbing, generators, winches, hi-lift jacks, cranes, cutting torches, circular saws and other forms of heavy equipment unavailable on standard trucks. This capability differentiates them from traditional pumper trucks or ladder trucks which are designed primarily to carry firefighters and their entry gear as well as on-board water tanks, hoses and equipment for fire extinguishing and light rescue. Most rescue vehicles lack on-board water tanks and pumping gear, owing to their specialized role. A rescue vehicle is typically operated by a rescue squad, but in some areas it may be integrated with emergency medical services or fire departments.

== Uses ==
Rescue vehicles can be popular choices for incident command vehicles, national and local law enforcement (command/communications, SWAT, bomb response, etc.), rehab, Hazmat incidents, light & air, urban search and rescue (USAR), and more. Furthermore, many rescue vehicles can be outfitted based on their target environmental setting, such as municipal, industrial, or natural. These configurations, determined by the operational agency and district, and worked out with the manufacturing company, provide a plethora of options for storage, response, equipment, size, and more.

== Types ==
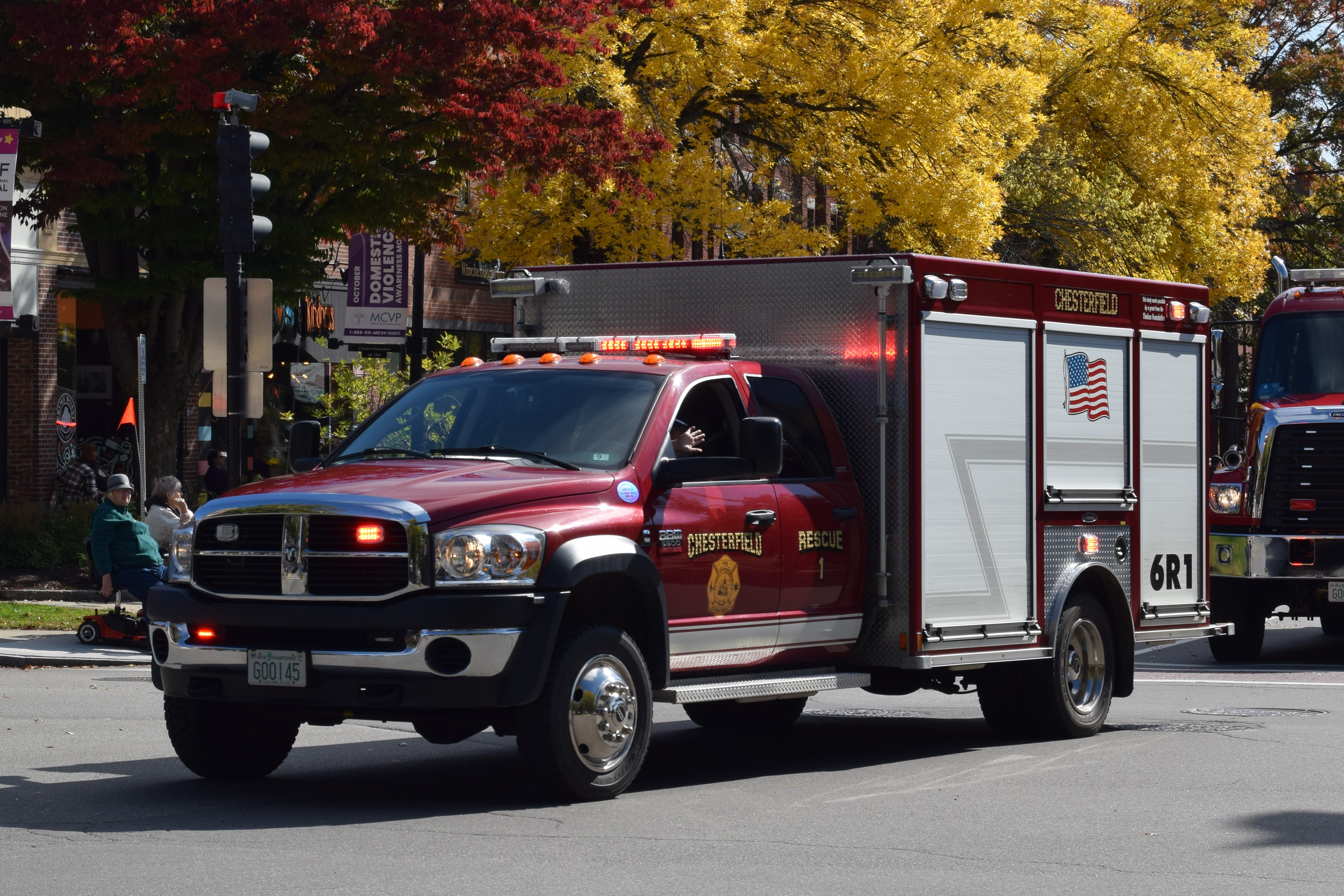
A light rescue vehicle used by Chesterfield, New Hampshire's fire department

Depending on the size of the vehicle and the equipment it carries, a rescue vehicle might fall into different categories, such as light, medium, heavy rescue, or technical rescue. While each of these categories often have overlapping tasks, they may be classified differently for the sake of dispatch on certain kinds of incidents. For instance, in Loudoun County, Virginia, the Loudoun County Combined Fire and Rescue System operates medium and heavy rescue apparatus, which are categorized based on equipment carried. In Loudoun, to avoid confusion, a medium rescue is referred to as a squad truck or a technical rescue (or simply squad), while a heavy rescue, which carries more equipment and is almost always larger, is referred to as a rescue (or heavy rescue). This differentiation exists to allow vehicles that would not normally be classified as medium rescues, such as certain rescue engines, or tower/ladder trucks to be dispatched on calls requiring a higher level of technical rescue, if the regular squad has been dispatched. This in turn leaves the heavy rescue apparatus available, as opposed to sending them on a call that could have been handled by a medium rescue. Many heavy rescue vehicles carry equipment for responses to multiple-casualty incidents, chemical spills and other situations. Some rescue vehicles carry specialized rescue tools for all kinds of technical rescues including rope, water rescue equipment, various cutting and prying tools and other equipment useful in all kinds of rescue situations.

In the United States, National Fire Protection Association standards 1006 and 1670 give guidance for the operation of rescue vehicles and also state that all "rescuers" must have medical training equivalent to EMT-Basic standard to perform any technical rescue operation, including cutting into the vehicle itself. Therefore, in most all rescue environments, whether it is an EMS or fire department that performs the rescue, the actual rescuers who cut the vehicle and run the extrication scene are medical first responders, emergency medical technicians, or paramedics, as a traffic collision has a patient involved.

== Railway rescue ==
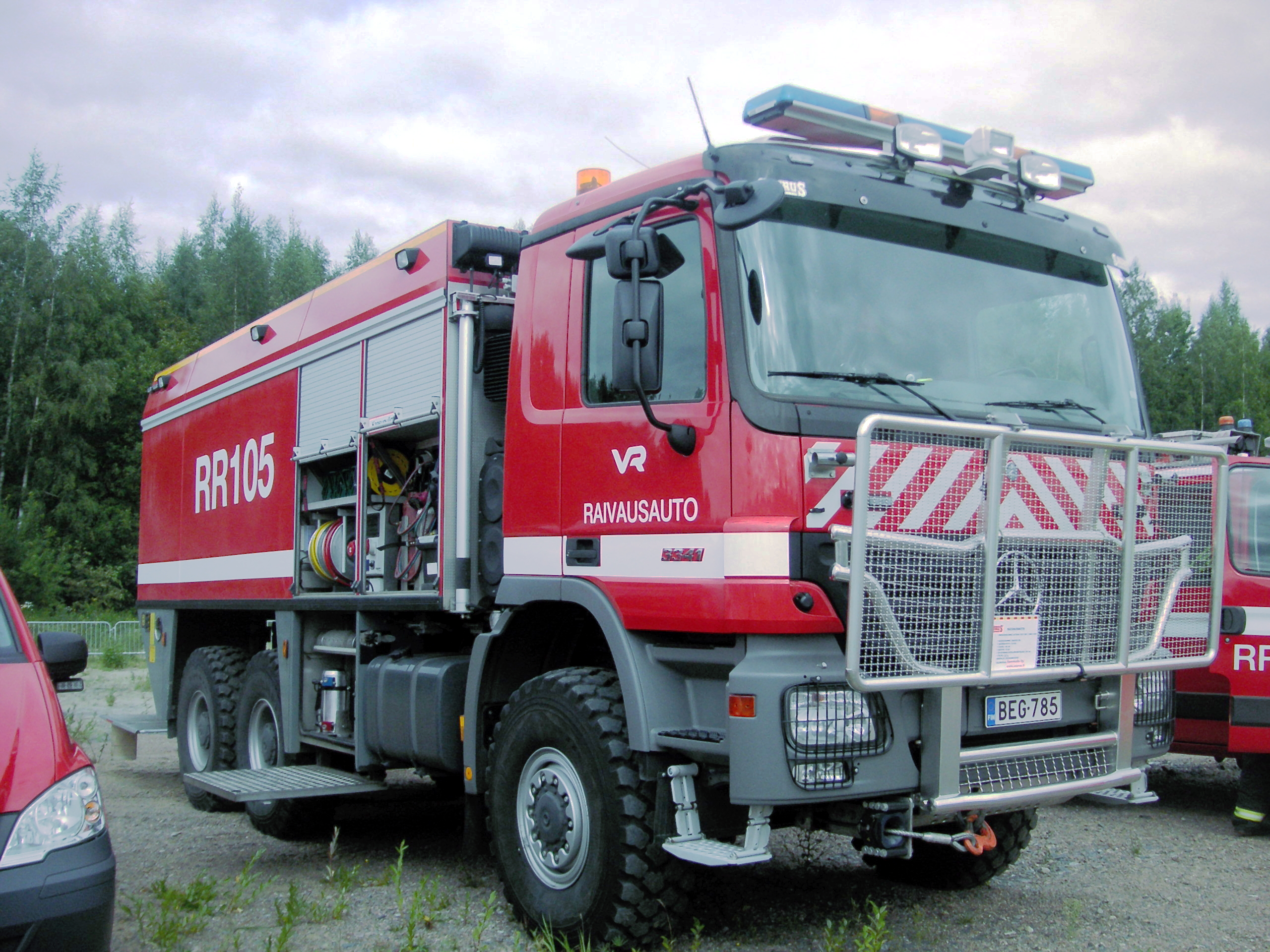
A rescue vehicle used by Finnish railway company VR.

In addition to traditional fire brigades and rescue departments, tram or railway companies may have their own rescue squads specialized in responding to tram or train wrecks including derailments. For example, railway rescue squads may carry specialized equipment for railway crashes, like heavy hydraulic jacks, heavy truck-mounted cranes for lifting and moving derailed locomotives and train cars, and equipment for capping leaking tank cars.

== See also ==
- Firefighting apparatus
- Glossary of firefighting terms
- Hazardous materials apparatus
- Rescue squad
