= Dulles Town Center, Virginia =

- Census-designated place
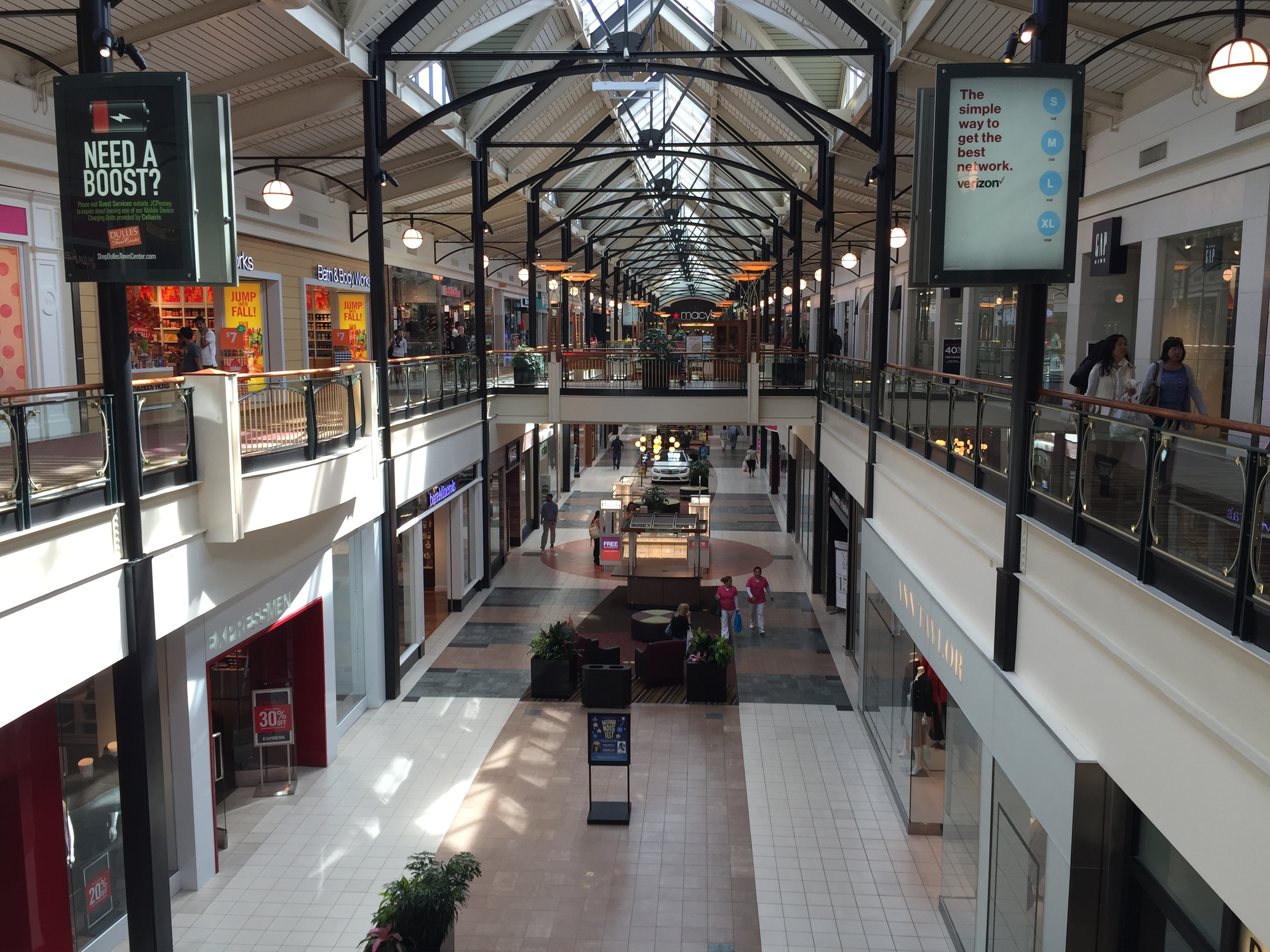
- The Dulles Town Center, for which the community is named after

- Location within Northern Virginia Location within Virginia Location within the United States
- Country: United States
- State: Virginia
- County: Loudoun
- Founded: August 12, 1999
- Named for: The Dulles Town Center shopping mall

Area
  - Total: 2.42 sq mi (6.28 km^{2})
  - Land: 2.40 sq mi (6.22 km^{2})
  - Water: 0.023 sq mi (0.06 km^{2})
- Elevation: 310 ft (94 m)

Population (2010)
  - Total: 4,601
  - Density: 1,916/sq mi (739.7/km^{2})
- Time zone: UTC−5 (Eastern (EST))
  - Summer (DST): UTC−4 (EDT)
- ZIP code: 20166 (Dulles)
- Area codes: 703 and 571
- FIPS code: 51-23732
- GNIS feature ID: 2584839

Dulles Town Center is a census-designated place (CDP) in Loudoun County, Virginia, United States. It is located about 7 miles (11 km) north of Washington Dulles International Airport. The CDP is the location of the Dulles Town Center shopping mall, for which it is named. The United States Postal Service considers Dulles Town Center to be a subsection of Dulles, which is itself a subsection of Sterling; none of these locations is an incorporated municipality.

As of the 2020 census, Dulles Town Center had a population of 5,909.

== History ==
In December 1987, Loudoun County officials approved the jurisdiction's first regional shopping mall. The mall was originally planned to be named the "Windmill Regional Shopping Center" but was later renamed to "Dulles Town Center" in 1988. The original expected opening was set for 1993. Dulles Town Center's developer was Lerner Enterprises.

The mall was put on hold until 1994 due to the downturn in the local economy. In March of that year the mall announced it would start construction that spring with plans to be open 1996. With further delays, it wasn't until the summer of 1996 that Dulles Town Center broke ground. The mall opened its first two anchor stores (Hecht's and Lord & Taylor) on November 18, 1998. The ribbon-cutting ceremony for Dulles Town Center took place on August 12, 1999.

=== 2023 shooting incident ===
On April 2, 2023, YouTuber Tanner Cook was shot in the stomach after harassing and following a stranger while filming a prank video. The shooter, Alan Colie, was arrested immediately but was ultimately found to have acted in justifiable self-defense after a jury trial. The gun used was a handgun, but the specific type of handgun hasn't been publicly disclosed.

== Geography ==
The Dulles Town Center CDP is in eastern Loudoun County. It is bordered to the north by Virginia State Route 7 (Leesburg Pike) and to the west by Virginia State Route 28. Neighboring communities are Sterling to the south and east, Ashburn and Kincora to the west, and Countryside and Cascades to the north. Dulles Town Center is 10 miles (16 km) southeast of Leesburg, the Loudoun county seat, and 27 miles (43 km) northwest of downtown Washington, D.C.

According to the U.S. Census Bureau, the CDP has a total area of 2.4 square miles (6.3 km^{2}), of which 0.02 square miles (0.06 km^{2}), or 0.94%, are water. The community drains westward to Broad Run, a north-flowing tributary of the Potomac River.

== Demographics ==
Historical population
Census	Pop.	Note	%±
2010	4,601		—
2020	5,909		28.4%
U.S. Decennial Census; 2010 2020

Dulles Town Center was first listed as a census designated place in the 2010 U.S. census.

== Government ==
=== Loudoun County Board of Supervisors ===
Dulles Town Center is part of the Sterling District of the Loudoun County Board of Supervisors, represented by Koran Saines.

=== Virginia General Assembly ===
Dulles Town Center is part of Virginia's 28th House of Delegates district, represented by Democrat David Reid, first elected in 2017, who resides in Ashburn. The CDP is also a part of Virginia's 32nd Senate district, represented by Democrat Suhas Subramanyam, first elected in 2023, who resides in Ashburn.

=== U.S. Congress ===
Dulles Town Center is part of Virginia's 10th congressional district, represented by Democrat Jennifer Wexton, first elected in 2018, who resides in Leesburg. Dulles Town Center is represented in the United States Senate by Democrat Tim Kaine and Democrat Mark Warner.
