= Dulles Town Center =

Shopping mall in Dulles, Virginia

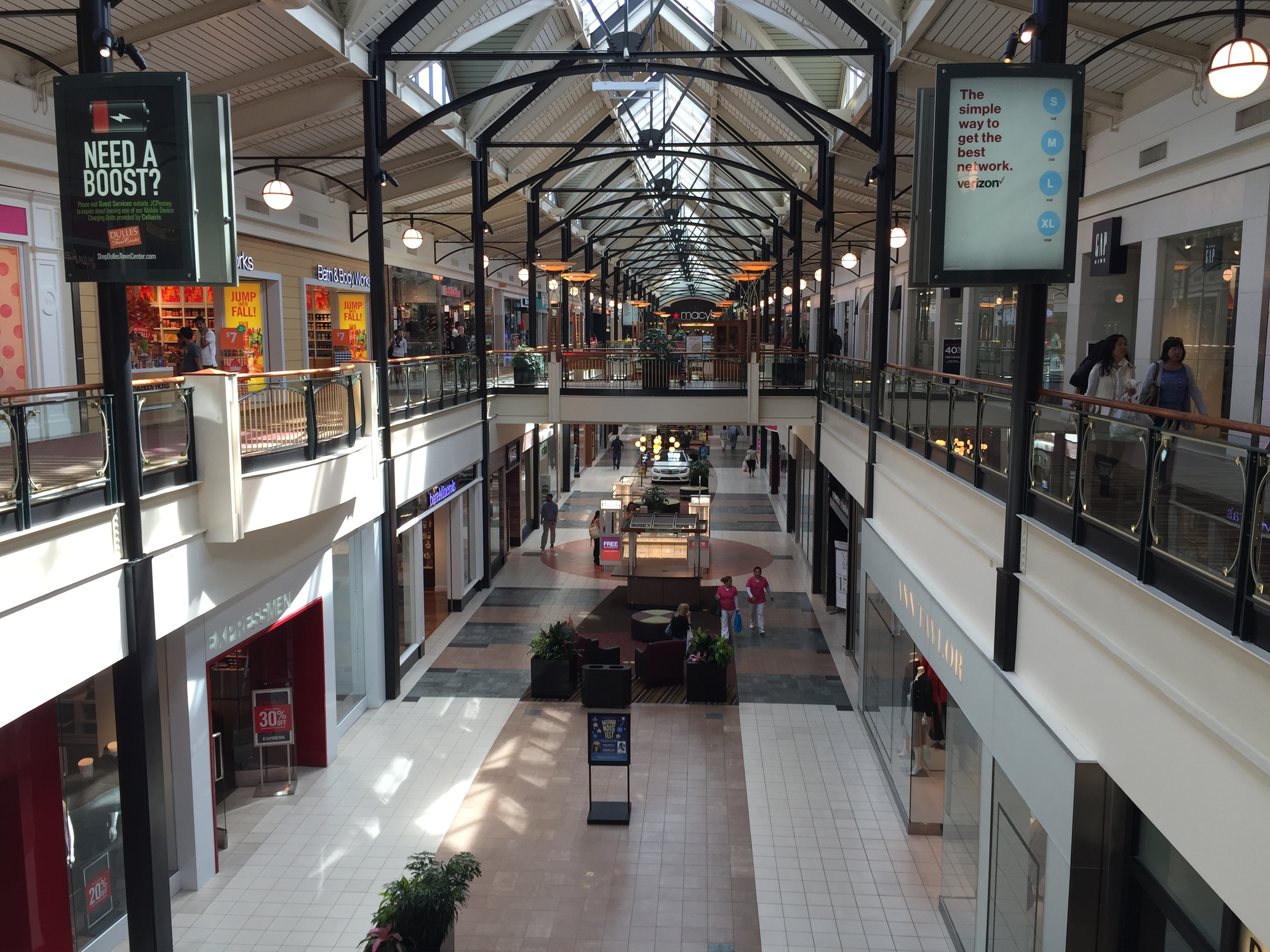
- Macy's Concourse, stores visible; Ann Taylor Stores, Bath & Body Works, and Gap Inc. (September 2015)
- Location: Dulles, Virginia, U.S.
- Coordinates: 39°1′55.7″N 77°25′25.8″W
- Opened: November 18, 1998; 27 years ago (first tenants) August 12, 1999; 27 years ago (rest of the mall)
- Developer: Lerner Enterprises and Cigna
- Owner: Srinivas Chavali
- Num. of stores: 150
- Num. of anchor tenants: 6 (2 coming soon)
- Floor area: 1,400,000 square feet (130,000 m^{2})
- Floors: 2
- Website: shopdullestowncenter.com

Dulles Town Center is a two-level enclosed shopping mall in Sterling in Loudoun County, Virginia. It is located five miles (8.0 km) north of Washington Dulles International Airport. It is part of the Dulles Town Center census-designated place for population statistical purposes. Anchor stores are JCPenney, Macy's, Sky Zone, Regal, 810 Billiards & Bowling, DTC Expo & Event Center, and Dick's Sporting Goods as a junior anchor.

== History ==
=== Development, construction, opening, and early history: 1987-2009 ===
In December 1987, Loudoun County officials approved the jurisdiction's first regional shopping mall, to be developed in a joint venture between Lerner Enterprises and Cigna. The mall was originally planned to be named the "Windmill Regional Shopping Center" but took its present name a year later.

Construction did not commence until years later, due to the nationwide recession. It was eventually scheduled to begin construction in spring 1994, with a planned opening date of 1996, but this timeline never came to fruition.

Construction did ultimately begin in 1996, with a target completion date of spring 1998.

Delays further pushed the opening back to November 1998, with its first two anchor stores (Hecht's and Lord & Taylor) opened on November 18, 1998. JCPenney and Sears opened in late Spring 1999, with the official grand-opening commencing August 12, 1999.

Another wing was added in 2002, anchored by Nordstrom as well as a two-level access corridor of various stores.

Around the same an Edwards Cinema was proposed for the adjoining vacant anchor pad. An LA Fitness opened on part of the site in 2004, followed by a Dick's Sporting Goods on the remainder of the site in 2006. An office building was attached to the Sears wing during this period, but was later razed for a Regal Cinemas Multiplex.

In 2006, all Hecht's stores were renamed Macy's, after their buyout of May Department Stores.

=== Anchor changes and expansion: 2010-present ===
On June 30, 2017, Nordstrom announced the closure of their anchor store.

In August 2020, it was announced that all Lord & Taylor stores nationwide would close, as a direct result of the COVID-19 pandemic.

On February 2, 2021, it was announced that Sears would close its anchor store.

In November 2020, Centennial, the mall development firm, announced it was planning an expansion with new retail space, a hotel, apartments, a high-end grocery retailer, as well as the introduction of green space.

In November 2022, Centennial announced nine new tenants, three of which were temporary holiday pop-up retailers.

In December 2023, Srinivas Chavali, the CEO of Virginia Property Investments, purchased the mall for $46 million.

In 2023, the Lord & Taylor anchor building was subdivided, and Campos Furniture opened a store on the upper level. Black Friday Daily Deals opened a discount store on the lower level in 2024.

In October 2024, the LA Fitness anchor closed.

The Sears anchor building was also subdivided to make way for new tenants. 810 Billiards & Bowling opened on the lower level of the former Sears space in 2025. Sky Zone Trampoline Park opened on the upper level of the former Sears space in 2026. These new tenants add an entertainment component to the mall.

In late 2025, Campos Furniture announced that it would close its location. The furniture store closed on November 30, 2025. Prior to the closing of Campos Furniture, it was announced that DTC Expo & Event Center would be relocating to the space of Campos Furniture and Black Friday Daily Deals. The new two story DTC Expo & Event Center will be a 120,000-square-foot facility and will host trade shows, exhibitions, conventions, concerts, corporate functions, and community gatherings. The new venue is expected to open in the second quarter of 2026. Around this time, Black Friday Daily Deals relocated and opened inside the former Sears Auto Center.

In late 2025, Patrick’s Elegant Living announced that it would be opening in the former Nordstrom space. The store plans to begin selling furniture on the first floor of the Nordstrom building in early 2026. The future plan is to eventually occupy both floors of the former Nordstrom building by late 2026.

== 2023 shooting incident ==
On April 2, 2023, Tanner Cook, a social media content creator, was shot in the stomach during a prank for YouTube. Cook's channel is called Classified Goons. The suspect, Alan Colie, who shot Tanner was arrested and later found not guilty of aggravated malicious wounding.
