= Kincora, Virginia =

- Census-designated place
- Location within Northern Virginia Location within Virginia Location within the United States
- Coordinates: 39°2′32″N 77°26′9″W
- Country: United States
- State: Virginia
- County: Loudoun

Area
  - Total: 0.54 sq mi (1.39 km^{2})
  - Land: 0.54 sq mi (1.39 km^{2})
  - Water: 0 sq mi (0.0 km^{2})
- Elevation: 235 ft (72 m)
- Time zone: UTC−5 (Eastern (EST))
  - Summer (DST): UTC−4 (EDT)
- FIPS code: 51-42501
- GNIS feature ID: 2804164

Kincora is a census-designated place in Loudoun County, Virginia, United States. As of the 2020 census, Kincora had a population of 367. The CDP was first drawn prior to the 2020 census.

== Geography ==
Kincora is in eastern Loudoun County, between Virginia State Route 28 to the east and Broad Run to the west. It extends north to Virginia State Route 7 and south to Gloucester Parkway. Russell Branch Parkway runs north–south through the center of the CDP. Kincora is bordered to the east by Dulles Town Center and to the north, west, and south by Ashburn. It is 8 miles (13 km) north of Dulles International Airport and 28 miles (45 km) northwest of Washington, D.C.

According to the U.S. Census Bureau, the Kincora CDP has a total area of 0.54 square miles (1.4 km^{2}), of which 0.06 acres (259 m^{2}), or 0.02%, are water. Via north-flowing Broad Run, the community is part of the Potomac River watershed.

== Demographics ==
Kincora first appeared as a census designated place in the 2020 U.S. census.
