= Devil Hole Run =

Devil Hole Run Devil's Hole Run
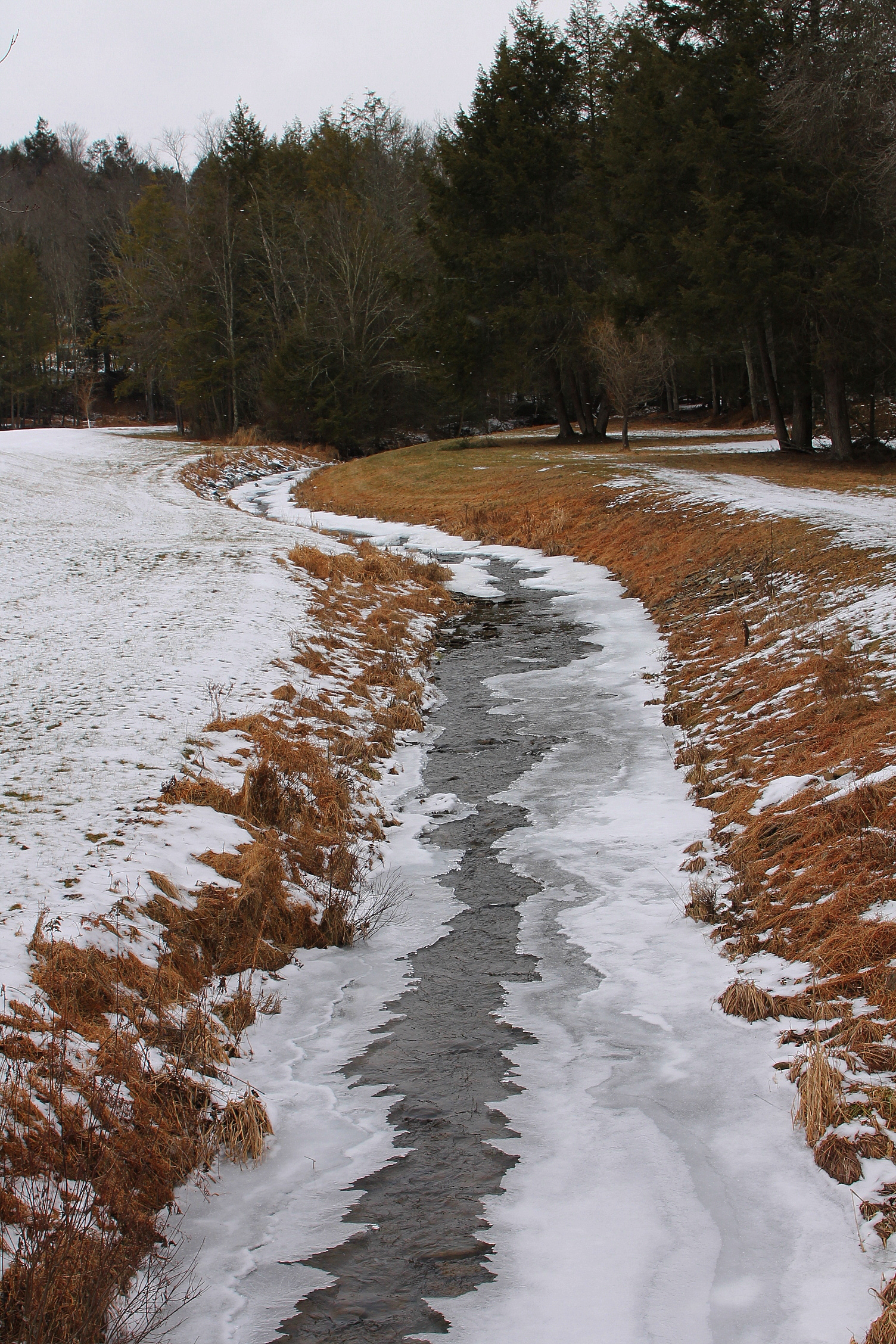
- Devil Hole Run from Devil Hole Run Road
- Etymology: named for its "Hell-like" and "sinister" appearance

Physical characteristics
- Source
  - location: small pond in Pine Township, Columbia County, Pennsylvania
  - elevation: between 1,260 and 1,280 feet (380 and 390 m)
- Mouth
  - location: Little Fishing Creek on the border between Pine Township, Columbia County, Pennsylvania and Greenwood Township, Columbia County, Pennsylvania
  - coordinates: 41°11′30″N 76°28′47″W
  - elevation: 853 ft (260 m)
- Length: 2.7 mi (4.3 km)

Basin features
- Progression: Little Fishing Creek → Fishing Creek (North Branch Susquehanna River) → Susquehanna River → Chesapeake Bay
- Tributaries
  - left: Kline Hollow Run

Devil Hole Run (also known as Devil's Hole Run) is a tributary of Little Fishing Creek in Columbia County, Pennsylvania, in the United States. It is approximately 2.7 miles (4.3 km) long and flows through Pine Township. The stream is mostly surrounded by forested land and it is part of a Locally Significant Area listed on the Columbia County Natural Areas Inventory. It has a single named tributary. Plantlife common in the vicinity of the stream include hemlock trees. Trout inhabit the stream itself.

== Course ==
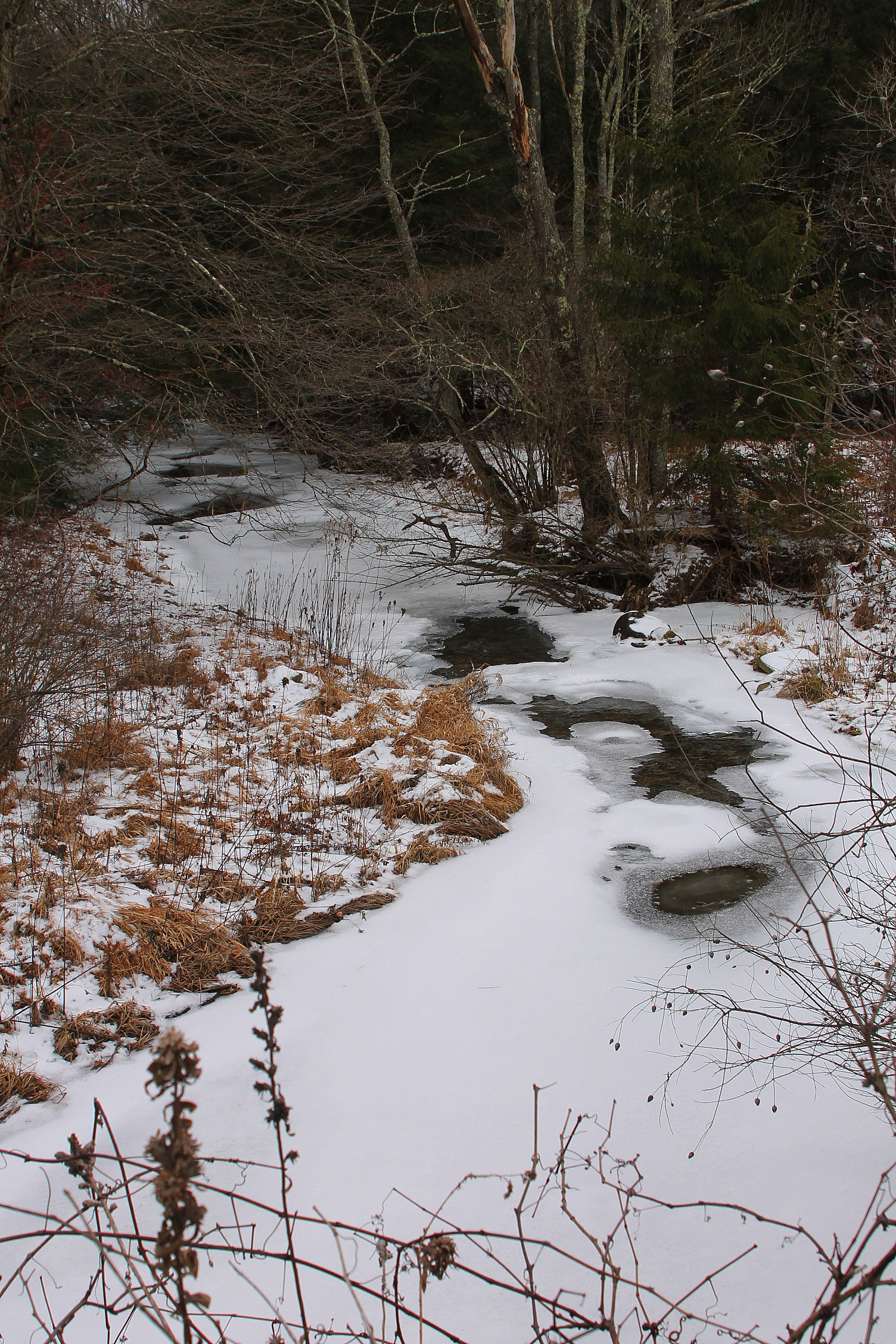
Devil Hole Run looking downstream

Devil Hole Run begins in a small pond in Pine Township, a few hundred feet from the border between Columbia County and Lycoming County. It flows south-southeast for a few tenths of a mile before turning south. After a few hundred feet, the stream turns south-southeast again, crossing Wolf House Hollow Road. Its valley becomes deeper as it continues downstream. After at least two miles (three kilometers), it receives its only named tributary, Kline Hollow Run. At this point, the stream turns south for a few tenths of a mile, crossing Devil Hole Run Road. It then exits its valley and turns southeast. A short distance further downstream, it reaches its confluence with Little Fishing Creek on the border between Pine Township and Greenwood Township.

=== Tributaries ===
Kline Hollow Run, which joins Devil Hole Run in the latter stream's lower reaches, is the only named tributary of Devil Hole Run.

== Hydrology, geography and watershed ==
The elevation near the mouth of Devil Hole Run is 853 feet (260 m) above sea level. The elevation of the stream's source is between 1,260 feet (380 m) and 1,280 feet (390 m) above sea level.

The area that surrounds Devil Hole Run is known as Devil's Hole Hollow.

Devil Hole Run is located in the United States Geological Survey quadrangle of Benton. The mouth of the stream is at the community of Cole's Mill and is located near the community of Derrs. The stream is within a large and mostly untouched block of forest. The only roads that are close to the stream are small private roads.

Devil Hole Run is part of a Locally Significant Area in Columbia County. The area's county priority rank is five on a scale of one to five, with one being the most important and five being the least important.

The water temperature of Devil Hole Run is cooled by nearby shrubbery. This causes the stream to have a relatively high concentration of dissolved oxygen.

== History, etymology, and industries ==
Devil Hole Run was entered into the Geographic Names Information System on August 2, 1979. Its identifier in the Geographic Names Information System is 1173197.

Devil Hole Run is so-named because of its "treacherous waters" and because the area in the vicinity of the stream is "Hell-like" and "sinister" according to Walter M. Brasch in his book Columbia County Place Names.

The Columbia County Natural Areas Inventory advises against extensive logging in the vicinity of Devil Hole Run.

== Biology ==
Wild trout naturally reproduce in Devil Hole Run between its headwaters and its mouth. The stream is on the Pennsylvania Fish and Boat Commission's list of wild trout streams.

Hemlock trees are very common in the vicinity of Devil Hole Run. There are herbaceous openings of small size along the stream. These openings are likely to contain wet meadows, with various sedges, shrubs, and wetland plants.

The area surrounding Devil Hole Run is described as a "high quality natural habitat" in the Columbia County Natural Areas Inventory.

== See also ==
- Wolfhouse Run, next tributary of Little Fishing Creek going downstream
- Little Brier Run, next tributary of Little Fishing Creek going upstream
- List of tributaries of Fishing Creek (North Branch Susquehanna River)
