= Kline Hollow Run =

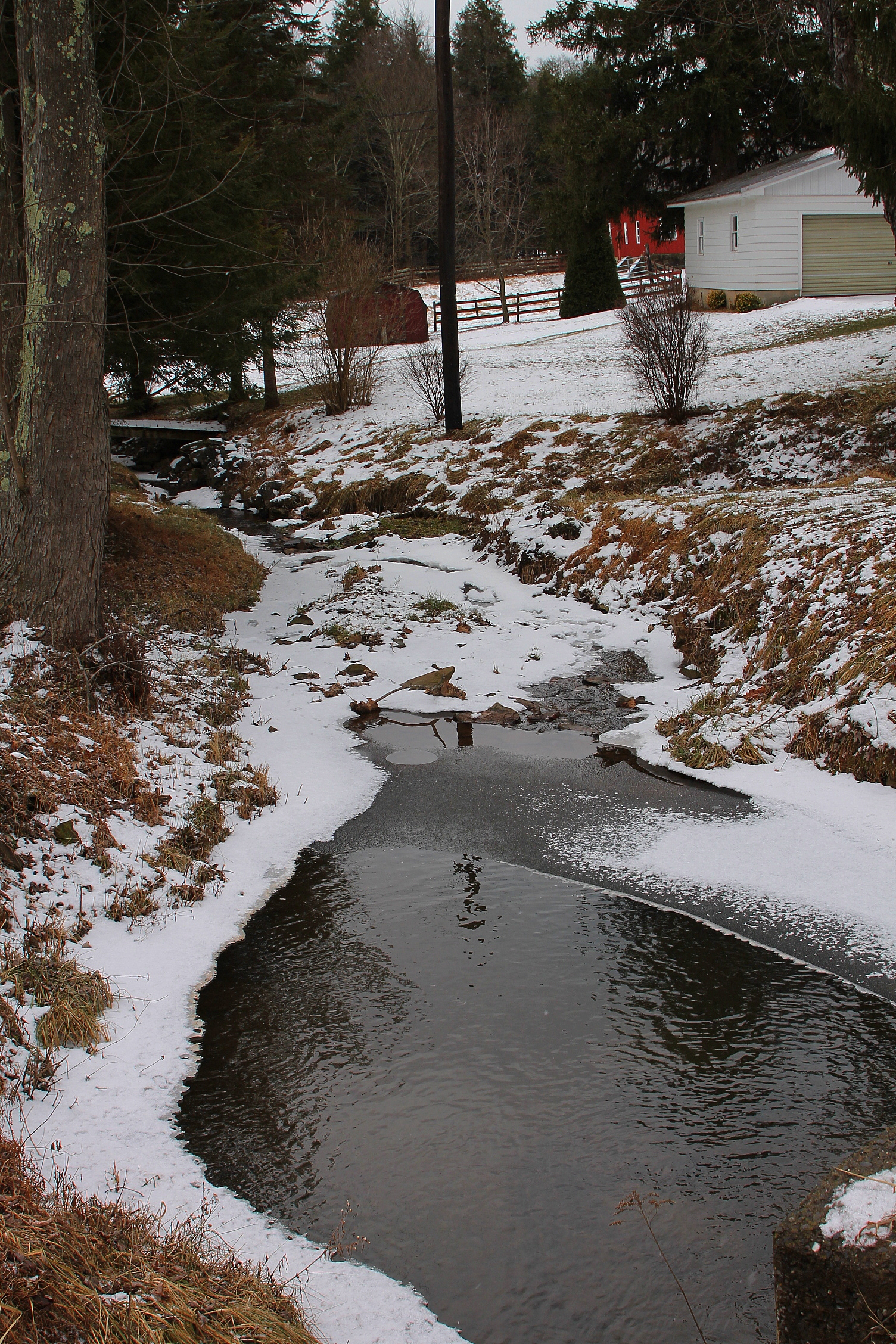
- Kline Hollow Run in its upper reaches
- Etymology: named after the Kline Family

Physical characteristics
- Source
  - location: valley in Jordan Township, Lycoming County, Pennsylvania
  - elevation: between 1,220 and 1,240 ft (370 and 380 m)
- Mouth
  - location: Devil Hole Run in Pine Township, Columbia County, Pennsylvania
  - coordinates: 41°11′56″N 76°29′01″W
  - elevation: 869 ft (265 m)
- Length: 3.6 mi (5.8 km)

Basin features
- Progression: Devil Hole Run → Little Fishing Creek → Fishing Creek (North Branch Susquehanna River) → Susquehanna River → Chesapeake Bay

Kline Hollow Run is a tributary of Devil Hole Run in Lycoming County and Columbia County, in Pennsylvania, in the United States. It is approximately 3.6 miles (5.8 km) long and flows through Jordan Township in Lycoming County and Pine Township in Columbia County. The stream is mostly surrounded by forested land and it is part of a Locally Significant Area listed on the Columbia County Natural Areas Inventory. Plantlife common in the vicinity of the stream include hemlock trees and trout inhabit the stream itself. The stream is considered to be an Exceptional Value stream.

== Course ==
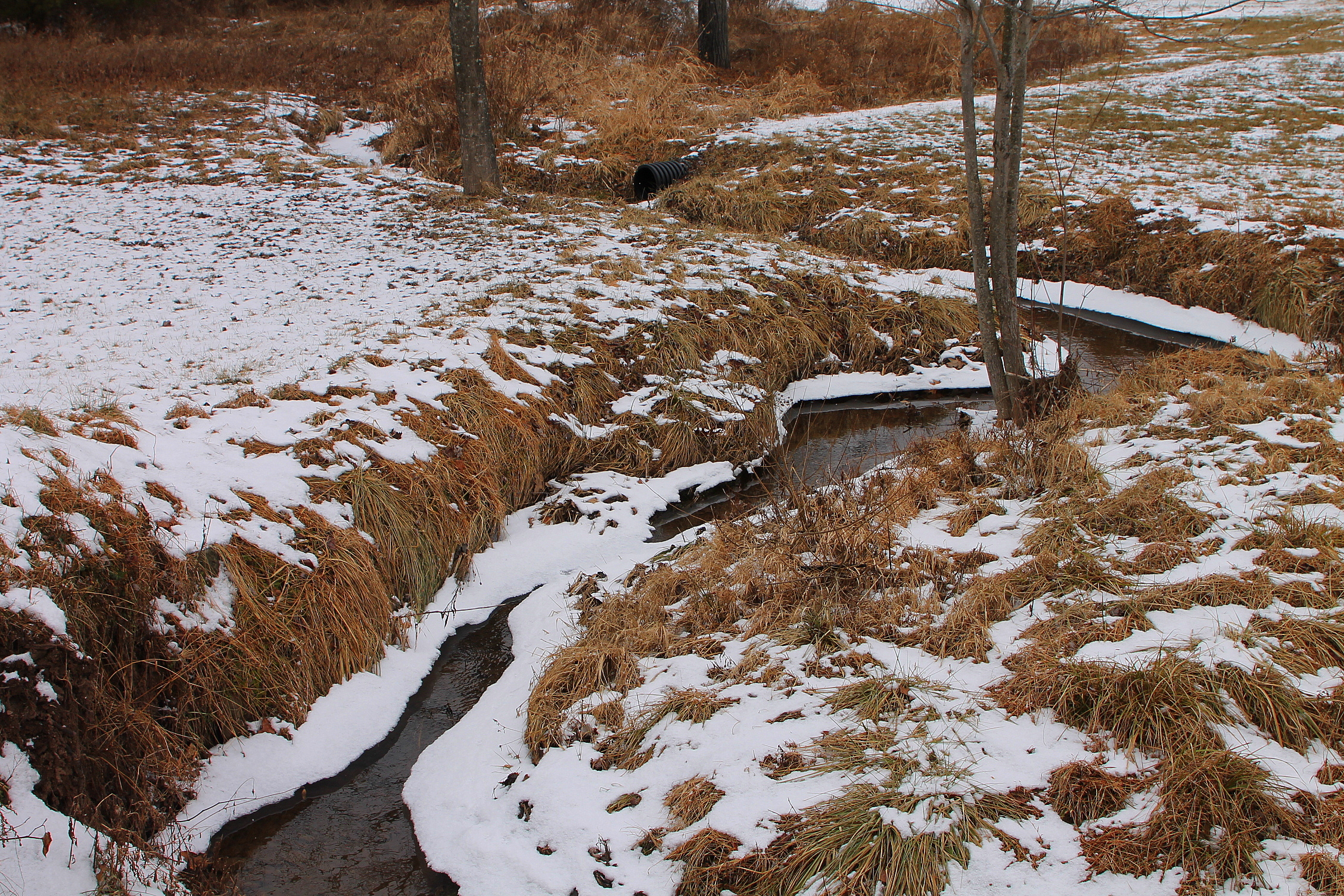
Kline Hollow Run in its upper reaches

Kline Hollow Run begins in a valley in Jordan Township, Lycoming County, a short distance south of Richarts Grove. It flows south for a few hundred feet before turning southwest. The stream then turns south-southeast and passes through a pond. Several tenths of a mile further downstream, it exits Jordan Township and Lycoming County.

Upon exiting Lycoming County, Kline Hollow Run enters Pine Township, Columbia County. It continues flowing south-southeast for more than a mile, receiving an unnamed tributary, before eventually gradually turning south. The stream's valley deepens as it flows south for more than a mile, passing by Huckleberry Ridge. Near the southern edge of Huckleberry Ridge, the stream reaches its confluence with Devil Hole Run.

== Hydrology, geography and watershed ==
The elevation near the mouth of Kline Hollow Run is 869 feet (265 m) above sea level. The elevation of the stream's source is between 1,220 feet (370 m) and 1,240 feet (380 m).

Kline Hollow Run is surrounded by a hollow known as Kline Hollow. Stormwater runoff from a sawmill discharges into the stream as of 2001.

Kline Hollow Run is in the United States Geological Survey quadrangle of Benton. Additionally, the stream is located in the northern part of Pine Township and is approximately one mile (two kilometers) west of the community of Derrs. The stream is within a large and mostly untouched block of forest. The only roads that are close to the stream are small private roads.

Kline Hollow Run is part of a Locally Significant Area in Columbia County. The area's county priority rank is five on a scale of one to five, with one being the most important and five being the least important.

The water temperature of Kline Hollow Run is cooled by nearby shrubbery. This causes the stream to have a relatively high concentration of dissolved oxygen.

== History, etymology, and industries ==
Kline Hollow Run was entered into the Geographic Names Information System on August 2, 1979. Its identifier in the Geographic Names Information System is 1178586.

Kline Hollow Run is named after the Kline Family. Kline Hollow, the hollow through which the stream flows, has the same etymology.

The Columbia County Natural Areas Inventory advises against extensive logging in the vicinity of Devil Hole Run.

== Biology ==
Wild trout naturally reproduce in Kline Hollow Run between its headwaters and its mouth. The stream is considered to be an Exceptional Value stream. It is on the Pennsylvania Fish and Boat Commission's list of wild trout streams.

Hemlock trees are one of the dominant tree species in the vicinity of Kline Hollow Run. There are also small and herbaceous openings along the stream. These openings are likely to contain wet meadows, with various sedges, shrubs, and wetland plants.

The area surrounding Kline Hollow Run is described as a "high quality natural habitat" in the Columbia County Natural Areas Inventory.

== See also ==
- List of tributaries of Fishing Creek (North Branch Susquehanna River)
