= Private highways in the United States =

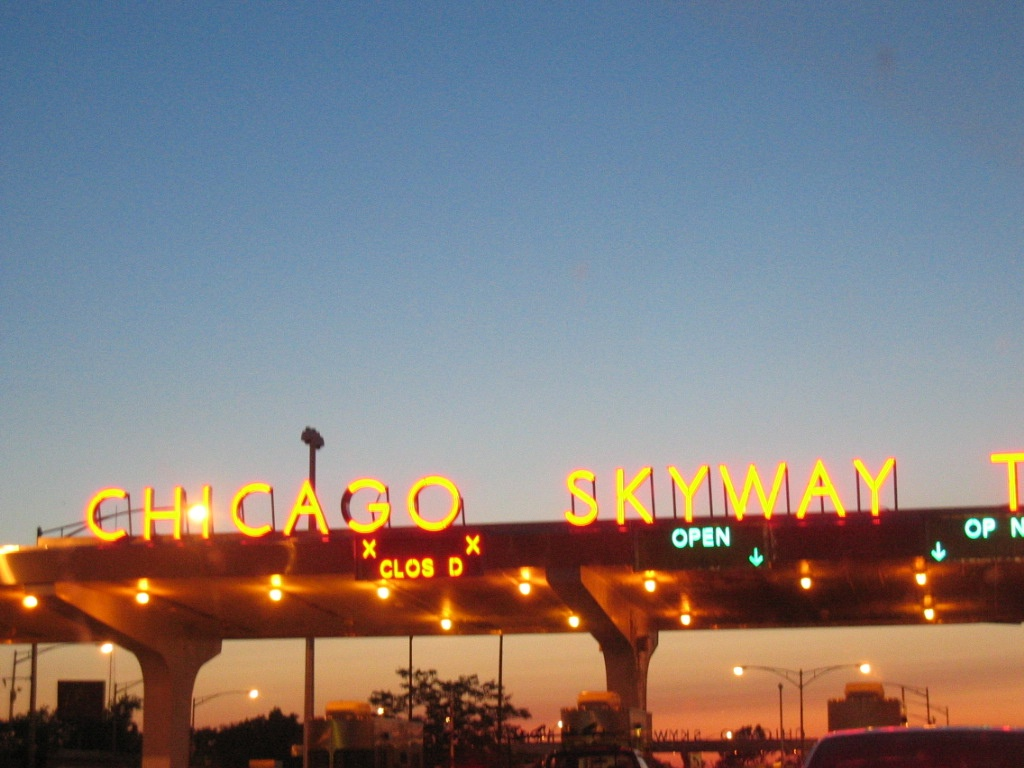
The Chicago Skyway is privately owned by the Skyway Concession Company

There are relatively few private highways in the United States, compared to other parts of the world.

The Philadelphia and Lancaster Turnpike, opened in 1795 between Philadelphia, Pennsylvania and Lancaster, Pennsylvania, was the first major American turnpike. According to Gerald Gunderson's Privatization and the 19th-Century Turnpike, "In the first three decades of the 19th century, Americans built more than 10,000 miles [16,000 km] of turnpikes, in New England and the Middle Atlantic states. Relative to the economy at that time, this effort exceeded the post-World War II interstate highway system." Because electronics did not exist in that era, all tolls had to be collected by human cashiers at toll booths, creating high fixed costs that could only be covered by a large volume of traffic. As railroads and steamboats began to compete with the turnpikes, less profitable highways started to shut down or be turned over to governments. (See Category: Pre-freeway turnpikes in the United States for a listing.)

The National Bridge Inventory lists roughly 2,200 privately owned highway bridges in 41 states and Puerto Rico.

== Alabama ==
There are three toll roads privately owned and operated by American Roads LLC in Alabama:

- Alabama River Parkway, Montgomery, Alabama
- Emerald Mountain Expressway, Montgomery, Alabama
- Western Bypass, Tuscaloosa, Alabama

The company declared bankruptcy in 2013. Syncora Guarantee, Inc., became the owner.

American Roads / Syncora also operated the Foley Beach Express in Orange Beach starting in June 2000, but in May 2024 the state of Alabama bought the road and quickly abolished the tolls.

== Alaska ==
=== Dalton Highway ===
The Dalton Highway in Alaska was built in 1974 to allow construction of the Trans-Alaska Pipeline System. It runs 400 miles (640 km) from near Fairbanks to Prudhoe Bay on the Arctic Ocean. Rather than relieving congestion, the highway was built to allow access to the previously inaccessible Prudhoe Bay Oil Field. Until 1995, permits were required to drive on the highway. Currently, it is owned by the state of Alaska and open to the public.

== California ==
AB 680, passed in 1989, allowed up to four private highway franchises to be granted. The 91 Express Lanes in the median of the Riverside Freeway were privately owned and operated by a private consortium (one of the members of which was Cofiroute, France's largest private highway operator) from 1995 to 2003. As of 2003 the expresslanes have come under the ownership of the Orange County Transportation Authority (OCTA), a public transportation authority serving the area of Orange County, California.

== Colorado ==
The Colorado legislature considered a bill to ban the use of eminent domain to condemn private property for private highway construction. Such legislation was vetoed in 2005, but a compromise bill was enacted into law in 2006. The new law requires toll road developers to get approval from cities and counties affected by a proposed road and requires projects to go through a transportation department approval process, complete with an environmental assessment.

=== Super Slab ===
The Super Slab is a proposed private highway that would run from north of Fort Collins to south of Pueblo. It sparked a debate on the use of eminent domain for such purposes. proposed the Castle Rock Alternative Parkway, which would run through the home of Super Slab developer Ray Wells.

== Florida ==
=== Orchard Pond Parkway ===
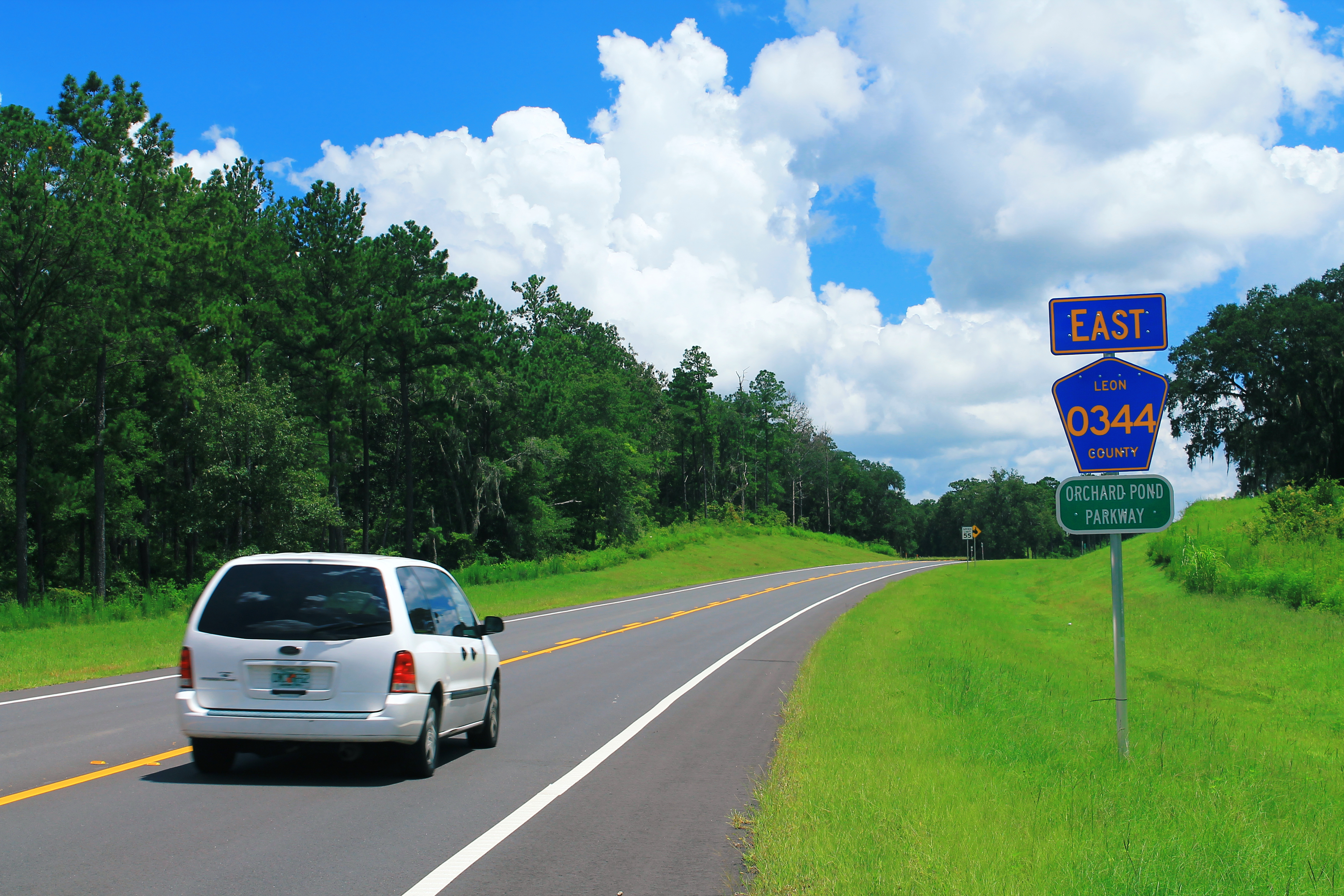
The Orchard Pond Parkway, located north of Tallahassee, Florida.

Regarded as "the first privately built toll road in Florida," the Orchard Pond Parkway is a 5.2-mile (8.4 km) route north of Tallahassee, Florida, acting as a northwestern partial bypass of the city, that opened on April 18, 2016.

=== Reedy Creek Improvement District ===
The Reedy Creek Improvement District (RCID), established in 1967 by the Reedy Creek Improvement Act, operates six-lane freeways in the Walt Disney World area near Orlando, Florida. Technically, the RCID is a public corporation administered by a five-member Board of Supervisors elected by area landowners. However, through a carefully constructed legal framework, Disney operates the roads and utilities as wholly owned subsidiaries, rather than as a public-private partnership.

Disney is the primary landowner and controls the remaining land through contractual arrangements. In this way, the company is able to hand-pick the landowning electorate. An Associated Press article notes, "Board members are non-Disney business people from central Florida and must own at least an acre [4,000 m²] in the district." An Office of Program Policy Analysis and Government Accountability report explains the contractual arrangement as follows: "Historically, each board member has been deeded approximately five acres [20,000 m²] of land by an affiliate of the Walt Disney World Co. . . . According to RCID officials, a Walt Disney World Co. affiliate has the exclusive option to purchase land back from board members at any time." Landowners also have a right to recall board members before the completion of their four-year terms.

Financial arrangements are also circular. According to the RCID Finance Department, Walt Disney Co. is RCID's largest taxpayer, paying about 86% of the district's taxes in 2004. The remaining taxpayers are board members and lessees of property owned by Disney affiliates (e.g., House of Blues, Travelodge, and Hilton) paying ad valorem taxes. An American Prospect article notes, "Disney pays taxes to Reedy Creek, which gives the money straight back to Disney, and the circle is closed".

== Georgia ==
=== SR 400 ===
In November 2024, the state of Georgia signed a contract with private firm SR 400 Peach Partners to revamp 16 miles of SR 400 north of I-285, and then operate the express lanes as a private tollway for 50 years. Construction is expected to start in late 2025, and substantial completion is anticipated in 2031.

== Illinois ==
=== Chicago Skyway ===
In 2006, Mayor Daley leased out the Chicago Skyway for 99 years for $1.8 billion. The road had lost money for decades and only recently turned a profit.

== Indiana ==
=== Indiana Toll Road ===
On June 29, 2006, in what may serve as a "test case" for the privatization of other major highways in the United States, the state of Indiana received $3.8 billion from a foreign consortium made up of the Spanish construction firm Cintra and the Australian Macquarie Infrastructure Group, and in exchange the state ceded operation of the 157-mile (253 km) Indiana Toll Road for the next 75 years to these outside corporations. The consortium will collect all the tolls. In 2014 the operators sought bankruptcy protection with a creditor-supported restructuring plan after dwindling traffic soured a $3.8 billion bet on a 75-year lease.

== Texas ==
In early 2007, there were plans for a private developer, Cintra-Zachry, to invest $1.3 billion to build a 40-mile (64 km) toll-funded southward extension to complete the "Trans-Texas Corridor." However, also in 2007, the Texas legislature enacted legislation placing a two-year moratorium on private equity toll concessions. Texas State Highway 130 was largely funded and operated by private developers but has been criticized for its poor quality and lack of use.

== Utah ==
The Adams Avenue Parkway near Ogden, Utah has a private toll section at the southern end.

== Virginia ==
=== Dulles Greenway ===
The Dulles Greenway, Virginia's first private toll road since 1816, is a 14-mile (23 km) highway connecting Washington Dulles International Airport with Leesburg, Virginia. In 1988, the Virginia General Assembly authorized private development of toll roads. To take advantage of this opportunity, the Bryant/Crane family of Middleburg, Virginia, AIE, L.L.C., and Kellogg, Brown and Root of Houston, Texas joined to form Toll Road Investors Partnership II (TRIP II). Brown & Root constructed the road with private funds, opening it for traffic on September 29, 1995. Autostrade International, a company with over 30 years of experience in the development, construction, maintenance, and operation of Italian toll road networks, formed an American subsidiary to take over operation of the Greenway.

The Greenway has several methods of expediting traffic flow. Six traffic lanes, a uniform 65 mph (105 km/h) speed limit, and a complete absence of traffic lights keep traffic moving at a steady pace. In addition, electronic toll collection, using the Virginia Department of Transportation's Smart Tag system, enables Smart Tag lanes to "process five times as many vehicles per hour as conventional cash payment lanes".

The Dulles Greenway charges a fixed amount for use of the road, regardless of whether the driver exits before driving the complete length of the Greenway. In 2004, the operators won approval from the State Corporation Commission to increase tolls from $2.00 to $3.00 per car. In 2005, Tom Sines of TRIP II announced plans for widening the highway, adding two new exits, expanding the main toll plaza, building a ramp to the airport, and reconfiguring an exit as a cloverleaf interchange.
