= Present value of revenues auction =

Method of awarding contracts

A present value of revenues auction, sometimes called a least present value of revenues auction, is a method of awarding contracts in which the bids are for the total present value of cash flows from the project. The lowest bid wins, and the winner collects user fees until the present value of user fees equals their bid. This system has been proposed for private highway construction.

== Use in infrastructure concessions ==
Present value of revenues auctions have been proposed mainly for infrastructure concessions, especially toll roads. Unlike a fixed-term concession, the concession length adjusts to actual demand: if traffic and toll revenues are lower than expected, the concession lasts longer, while if revenues are higher than expected, the concession ends sooner. This design is intended to reduce traffic-demand risk for the concessionaire while keeping the award criterion based on the lowest required present value of revenue.

The mechanism differs from auctions based on the lowest toll or shortest concession term because the winning bidder specifies the present value of revenue it requires. The concession ends when the present value of collected revenue reaches that bid, which can also make compensation calculations simpler if the project is terminated early.
