= McNair, Virginia =

- Census-designated place
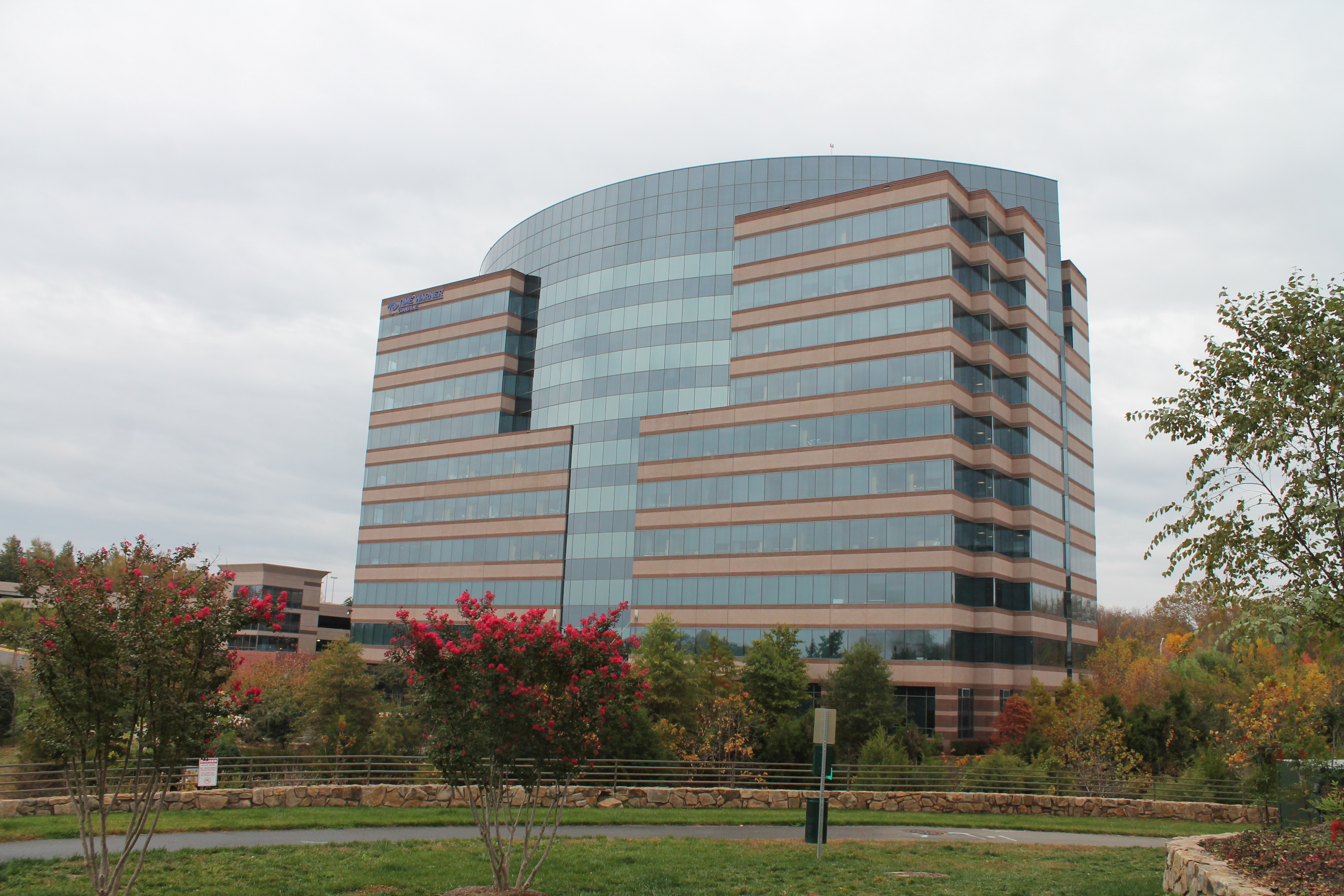
- Buildings in Dulles Corner

- Location within Northern Virginia Location within Virginia Location within the United States
- Coordinates: 38°57′8″N 77°24′50″W
- Country: United States
- State: Virginia
- County: Fairfax

Area
  - Total: 2.06 sq mi (5.33 km^{2})
  - Land: 2.04 sq mi (5.29 km^{2})
  - Water: 0.019 sq mi (0.05 km^{2})
- Elevation: 340 ft (100 m)

Population (2020)
  - Total: 21,598
  - Estimate (2024): 22,655
  - Density: 10,577/sq mi (4,083.8/km^{2})
- Time zone: UTC−5 (Eastern (EST))
  - Summer (DST): UTC−4 (EDT)
- ZIP code: 20171
- FIPS code: 51-48450
- GNIS feature ID: 2584871

McNair is a census-designated place located in the Oak Hill section of Fairfax County, Virginia, United States. It is directly to the east of Washington Dulles International Airport. The population as of the 2020 census was 21,598. Much of the population resides in the McNair Farms planned community. The community has a school called McNair Elementary.

McNair is also home to the Dulles Corner Business Park, home to the headquarters of Airbus Group, Inc. and Northrop Grumman Technical Services.

== Demographics ==
Historical population
Census	Pop.	Note	%±
2010	17,513		—
2020	21,598		23.3%
2024 (est.)	22,655	▲	4.9%
U.S. Decennial Census; 2010 2020

McNair was first listed as a census designated place in the 2010 U.S. census.

=== Racial and ethnic composition ===
McNair CDP, Virginia – Racial and ethnic composition Note: the US Census treats Hispanic/Latino as an ethnic category. This table excludes Latinos from the racial categories and assigns them to a separate category. Hispanics/Latinos may be of any race.
Race / Ethnicity (NH = Non-Hispanic)	Pop 2010	Pop 2020	% 2010	% 2020
White alone (NH)	5,457	5,283	31.16%	24.46%
Black or African American alone (NH)	2,543	3,618	14.52%	16.75%
Native American or Alaska Native alone (NH)	45	43	0.26%	0.20%
Asian alone (NH)	7,077	9,502	40.41%	43.99%
Native Hawaiian or Pacific Islander alone (NH)	4	6	0.02%	0.03%
Other race alone (NH)	57	110	0.33%	0.51%
Mixed race or Multiracial (NH)	538	781	3.07%	3.62%
Hispanic or Latino (any race)	1,792	2,255	10.23%	10.44%
Total	17,513	21,598	100.00%	100.00%

=== 2020 census ===
As of the 2020 census, McNair had a population of 21,598. The median age was 32.2 years. 23.2% of residents were under the age of 18 and 4.4% of residents were 65 years of age or older. For every 100 females there were 104.1 males, and for every 100 females age 18 and over there were 103.6 males age 18 and over.

100.0% of residents lived in urban areas, while 0.0% lived in rural areas.

There were 8,972 households in McNair, of which 33.7% had children under the age of 18 living in them. Of all households, 44.0% were married-couple households, 24.7% were households with a male householder and no spouse or partner present, and 25.0% were households with a female householder and no spouse or partner present. About 30.6% of all households were made up of individuals and 3.5% had someone living alone who was 65 years of age or older.

There were 9,673 housing units, of which 7.2% were vacant. The homeowner vacancy rate was 1.9% and the rental vacancy rate was 6.8%.

Racial composition as of the 2020 census
Race	Number	Percent
White	5,660	26.2%
Black or African American	3,680	17.0%
American Indian and Alaska Native	87	0.4%
Asian	9,519	44.1%
Native Hawaiian and Other Pacific Islander	6	0.0%
Some other race	1,142	5.3%
Two or more races	1,504	7.0%
Hispanic or Latino (of any race)	2,255	10.4%

=== 2010 census ===
The population as of the 2010 census was 17,513.

== Geography ==
The CDP is in northwestern Fairfax County, bordered to the northeast by the town of Herndon, to the east by Reston, to the south by Floris, and to the northwest by Loudoun County. The Dulles Toll Road (Virginia State Route 267) forms the northern edge of the CDP, and Virginia State Route 28 (Sully Road) forms part of the western border. Via the Dulles Toll Road and Interstate 66 it is 25 miles (40 km) east to downtown Washington, D.C.

According to the U.S. Census Bureau, the McNair CDP has a total area of 2.0 square miles (5.3 km^{2}), of which 0.02 square miles (0.05 km^{2}), or 0.85%, is water.
