= Virginia State Route 267 =

Highway in northern Virginia, US

State Route 267 Toll

Route information
- Maintained by ALX (under TRIP II) and MWAA
- Length: 28.68 mi (46.16 km)
- Existed: 1982–present
- Restrictions: No trucks east of exit 19B

Major junctions
- West end: US 15 / SR 7 in Leesburg
- SR 28 in Dulles; SR 286 in Reston; I-495 near Tysons
- East end: I-66 near Falls Church

Location
- Country: United States
- State: Virginia

Highway system
- Virginia Routes; Interstate; US; Primary; Secondary; Byways; History; HOT lanes
← I-264	→ SR 269

State Route 267 (VA 267) is a highway in the US state of Virginia. It consists of two end-to-end toll roads – the Dulles Toll Road and Dulles Greenway – as well as the non-tolled Dulles Access Road, which lies in the median of Dulles Toll Road and then extends east to Falls Church. The combined roadway provides a toll road for commuting and a free road for access to Washington Dulles International Airport. The three sections are operated and maintained by separate agencies: Dulles Toll Road and Dulles Access Road are administered by the Metropolitan Washington Airports Authority (MWAA); the Dulles Greenway is owned by TRIP II, a limited partnership, but is maintained by Atlas Arteria, an Australian company which owns the majority stake in the partnership. The Dulles Access Road's median hosts the Washington Metro's Silver Line between the airport and Tysons.

== Dulles Access Road ==
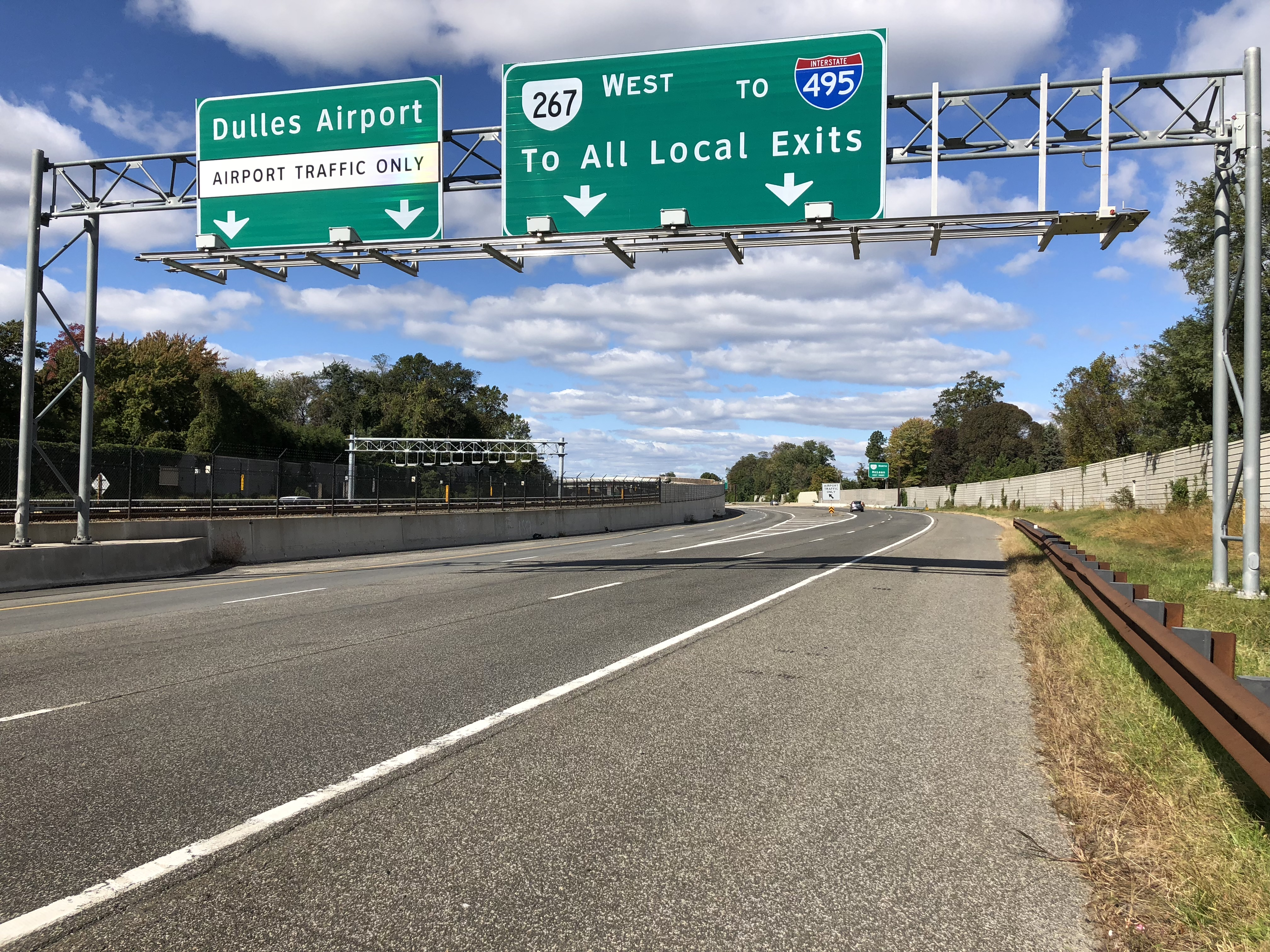
View west at the east end of the Dulles Access Road, where it diverges from the Dulles Toll Road

The Dulles Access Road is a four-lane, 13.65-mile (21.97 km) highway that runs between the westbound and eastbound roadways of the Dulles Toll Road, along the latter's median. As this road is exclusively used for entering and exiting Dulles Airport, there are no general-access exits from the westbound lanes, and no general-access entrances to the eastbound lanes, with the exception of gated slip ramps to and from the toll road that buses and emergency vehicles can use, and it is free of charge to use. The Access Road was built from the Beltway as part of the construction of Dulles Airport, and opened with the airport in 1962. It was extended to I-66 in 1985.

Until 2006, the Dulles Access Road was operated by the Virginia Department of Transportation (VDOT) under contract with the Metropolitan Washington Airports Authority, the owner of the land under both the Access Road and the Dulles Toll Road, and has the unsigned designation of State Route 90004.

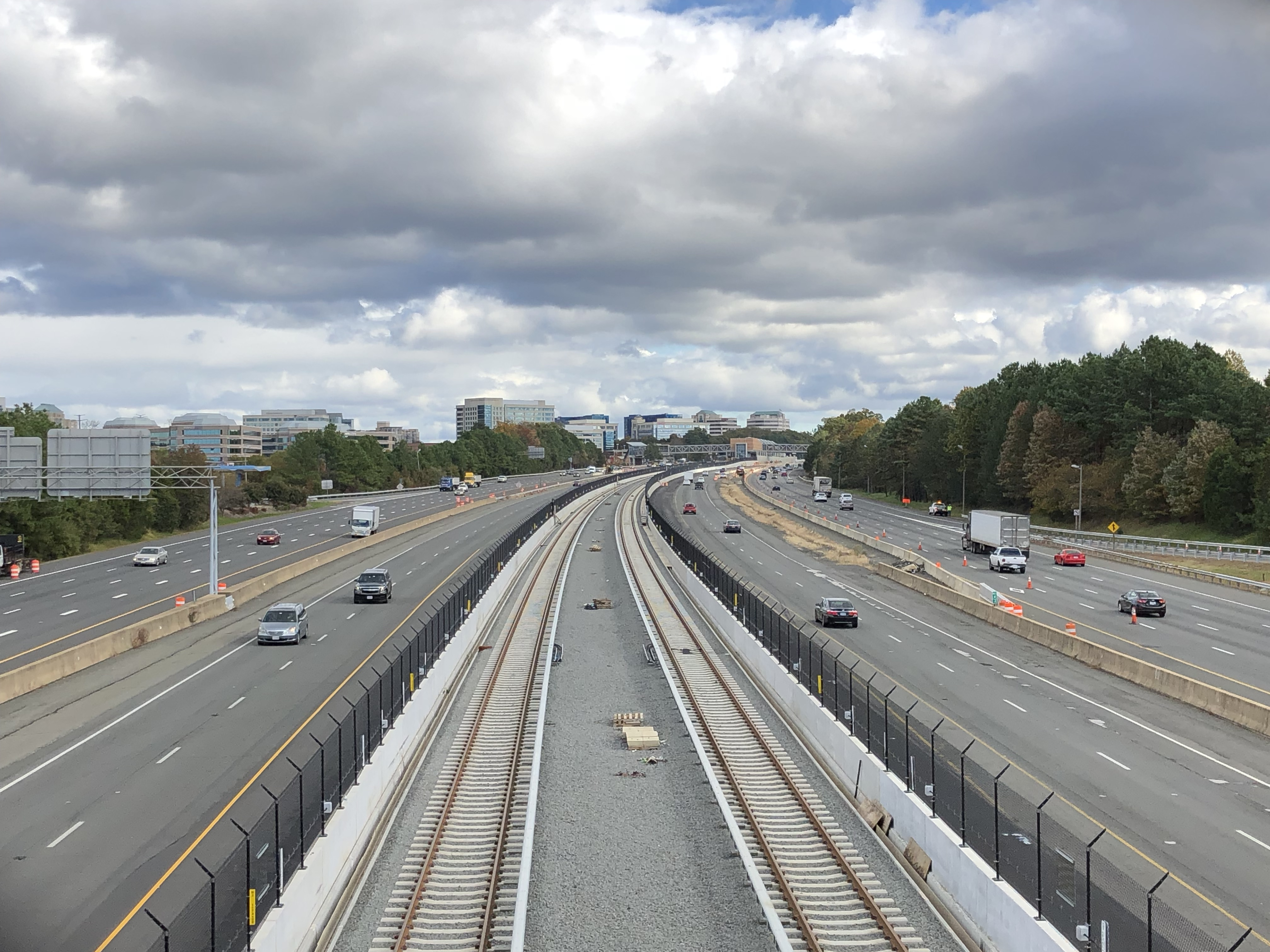
SR 267 eastbound at SR 286 in Reston

Since the opening of the Dulles Toll Road, the only major modification to the Access Road has been the construction of the Silver Line inside the median, and the construction of a flyover exit ramp from the eastbound Access Road to State Route 7. This ramp bypasses congestion associated with the main toll plaza, where traffic from Dulles Airport attempts to exit at Route 7.

=== Restrictions on use and violations ===
The Dulles Airport Access Road can be used only for travel to and from Dulles Airport and other businesses (such as air freight, hotels, and gas stations) on the airport grounds. Although it is illegal to use the Access Road without conducting such "airport business," some commuters evade the toll and the traffic on the Toll Road by taking the Access Road to the airport, then "backtracking" to their exit. For a couple of years prior to the opening of the Dulles Toll Road, VDOT issued special stickers allowing commuters (for a fee) to backtrack legally along the access highway, but these were discontinued when the toll road opened. Drivers can receive a fine and driver's license violations for using the Dulles Access Road illegally. Revenue from the fines is given to the county in which the fine is issued.

== Dulles Toll Road ==
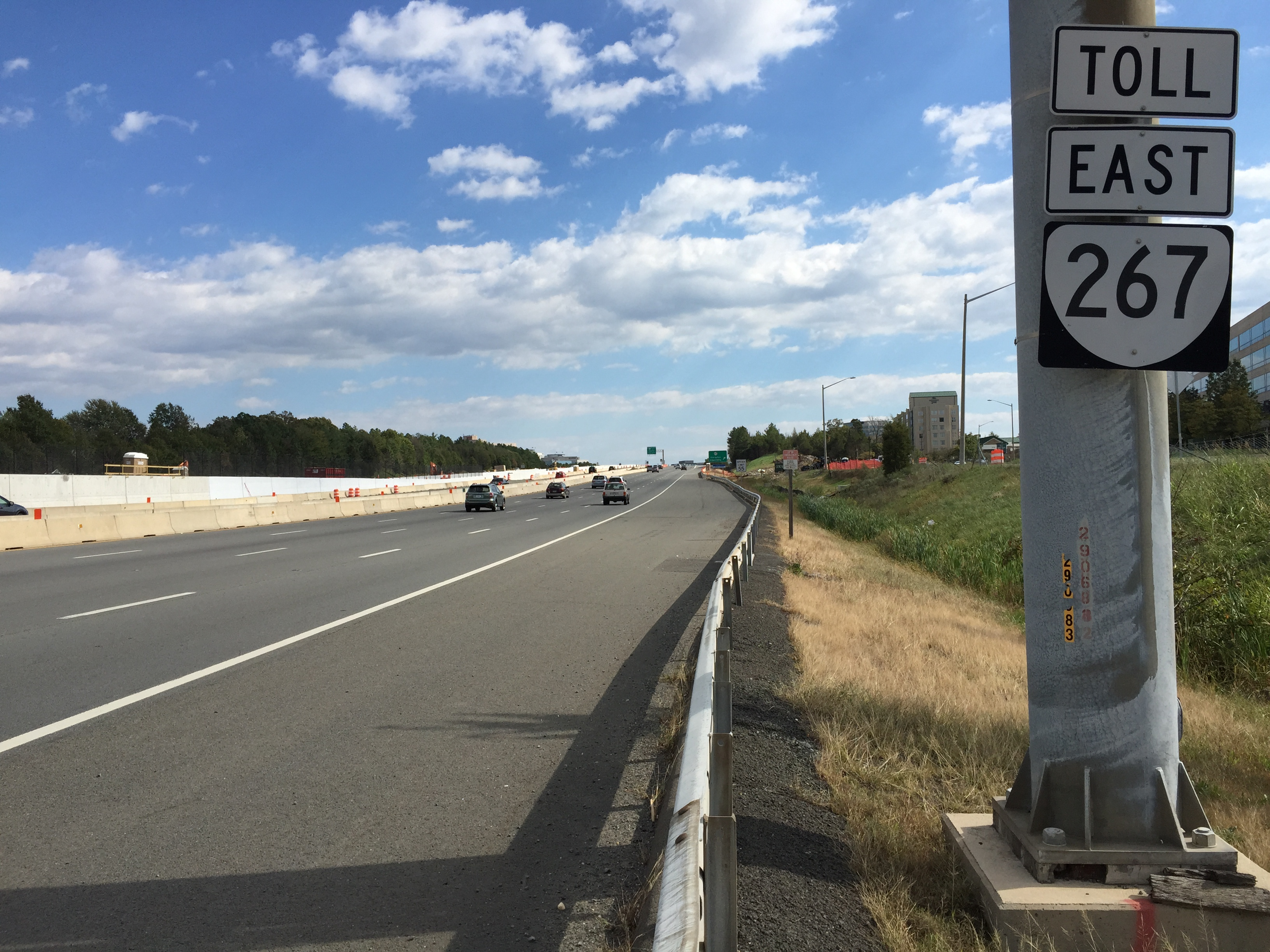
View east along SR 267 west of SR 657 in Oak Hill

The Dulles Toll Road is an eight-lane, 16.15-mile (25.99 km) toll road that runs outside the Dulles Access Road.

=== History ===
In response to the development along the Dulles Access Road and the number of motorists who backtracked through the airport to commute to outer suburbs, the Virginia Department of Transportation determined a need for a limited access highway to serve points along the Access Road without subjecting airport traffic to congestion. It was built in 1984 by the Virginia Department of Transportation as a toll highway, because conventional funding was not available. The toll road begins just inside the Capital Beltway near West Falls Church at a connector to Interstate 66 to Washington, D.C., travels westward through Fairfax County past Dulles, and terminates at the entrance to the Dulles Greenway, a privately owned toll road that is a continuation of Route 267. Officially, the road is named the Omer L. Hirst – Adelard L. Brault Expressway, in honor of two Virginia state legislators. However, the road is rarely referred to by that name. The speed limit is 55 miles per hour (90 km/h), and the original construction had two lanes in each direction.

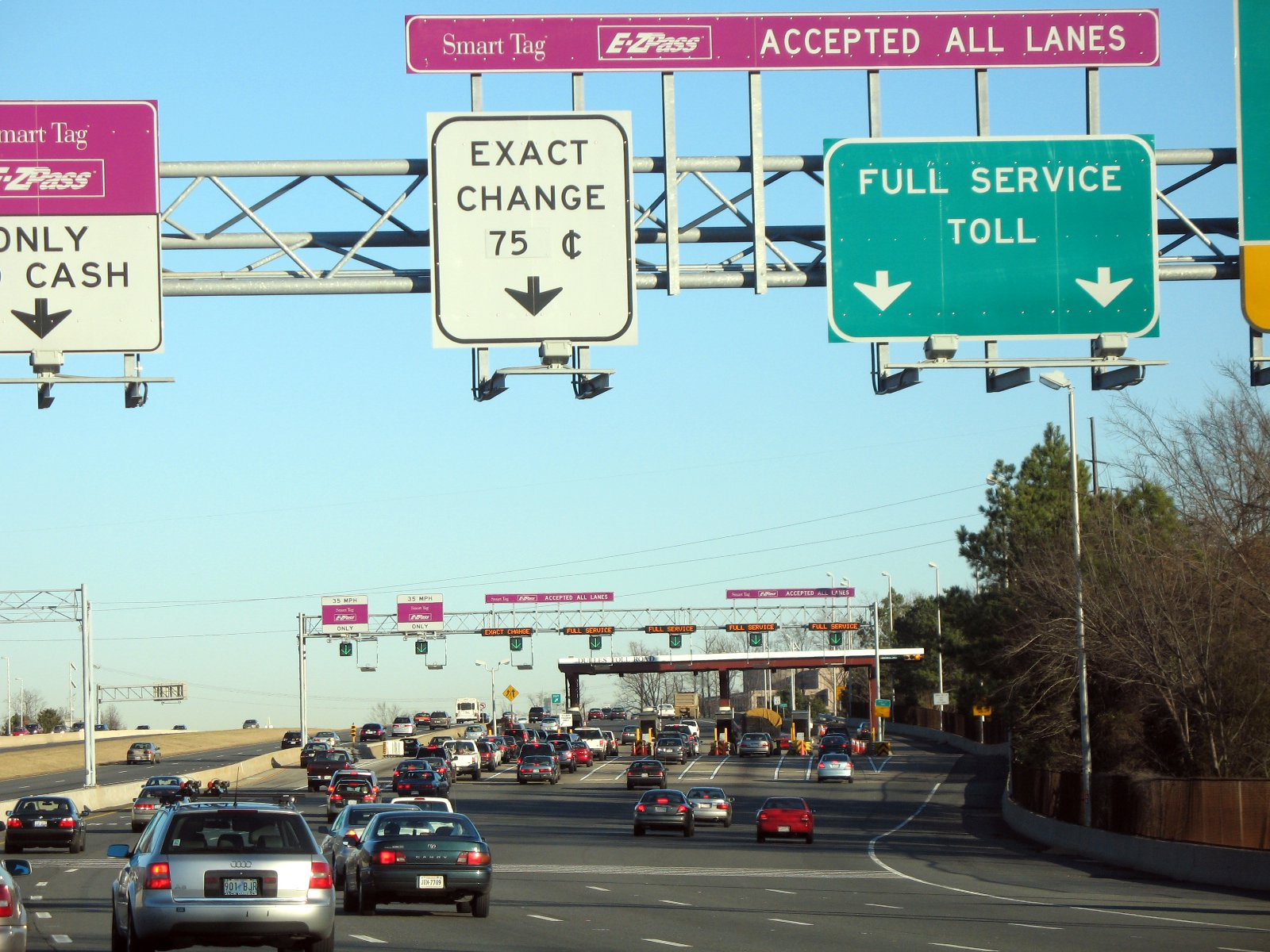
The main toll plaza of the Dulles Toll Road. At the time this photo was taken, the toll was 75¢. It has since increased.

A third lane was built to serve HOV traffic in 1992. For a short period between the end of construction and the start of HOV limits, drivers of single passenger vehicles used the lane and contacted government officials opposing the HOV policy. In response, Congress (which did not have direct control over the highway) passed special legislation prohibiting the imposition of HOV restrictions on the route. As a compromise to resolve the situation, Virginia decided to lift the HOV restriction and to construct a fourth lane in each direction to serve HOV traffic. However, unlike the third lane, officials did not allow non-HOV use at the end of construction in 1998, and avoided a repeat of the controversy. As a practical matter, the right of way could not fit any additional lanes other than the current six in each direction. However, Rep. Frank Wolf again threatened to pass federal legislation prohibiting the fourth lane to be limited to HOV traffic.

In 2005, five companies submitted proposals to VDOT to privatize the toll road which included payments to Virginia that could be used for transportation. In response MWAA made its own proposal to take over operation of the toll road from VDOT, assuming associated debts, and commit to building a rapid transit line in the median. VDOT agreed and, on March 27, 2006, MWAA took over from Virginia the operation of the Dulles Toll Road, including the outstanding debt and the obligation to construct the Silver Line in the median strip of the toll road. The first phase of the Silver Line (east of Reston) opened in July 2014, while the second phase (west of Reston) opened in November 2022.

=== Description ===
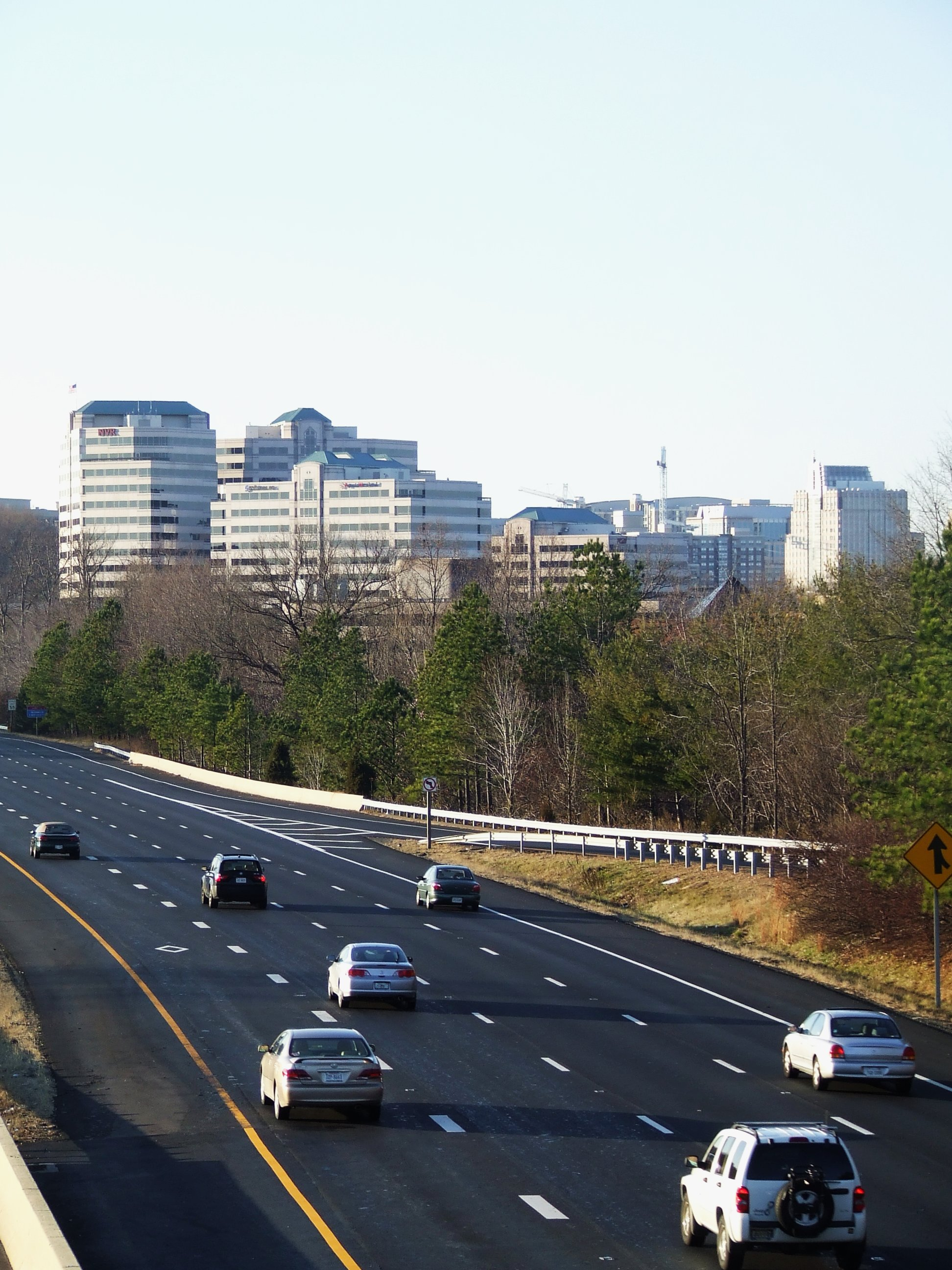
View of SR 267 from the Wiehle Avenue exit

From Interstate 495, motorists exiting onto SR 267 toward Dulles Airport must choose between lanes marked Airport Traffic Only and To All Local Exits; the Airport Traffic Only lanes lead to the two westbound lanes of the Access Road. Eastbound traffic is routed differently: Dulles-originating traffic can choose destinations between Herndon exits (putting them on the mainline Toll Road) or further on (starting on the Access Road), and transfer exits are provided from the Access Road to the Toll Road before the Herndon exits, Reston exits, and I-495. Access Road traffic to State Route 7 uses a separate exit ramp from those of the Toll Road, and then the two eastbound segments merge before the junction with Interstate 66.

Tolls are collected by electronic toll collection systems, which accept E-ZPass or a compatible system. Currently, the tolls cost a minimum of $4.00 on the main toll plazas and $2.00 on exit ramps, with rates increasing for vehicles with over two and ones without an E-ZPAss. The Access Road is free of charge.

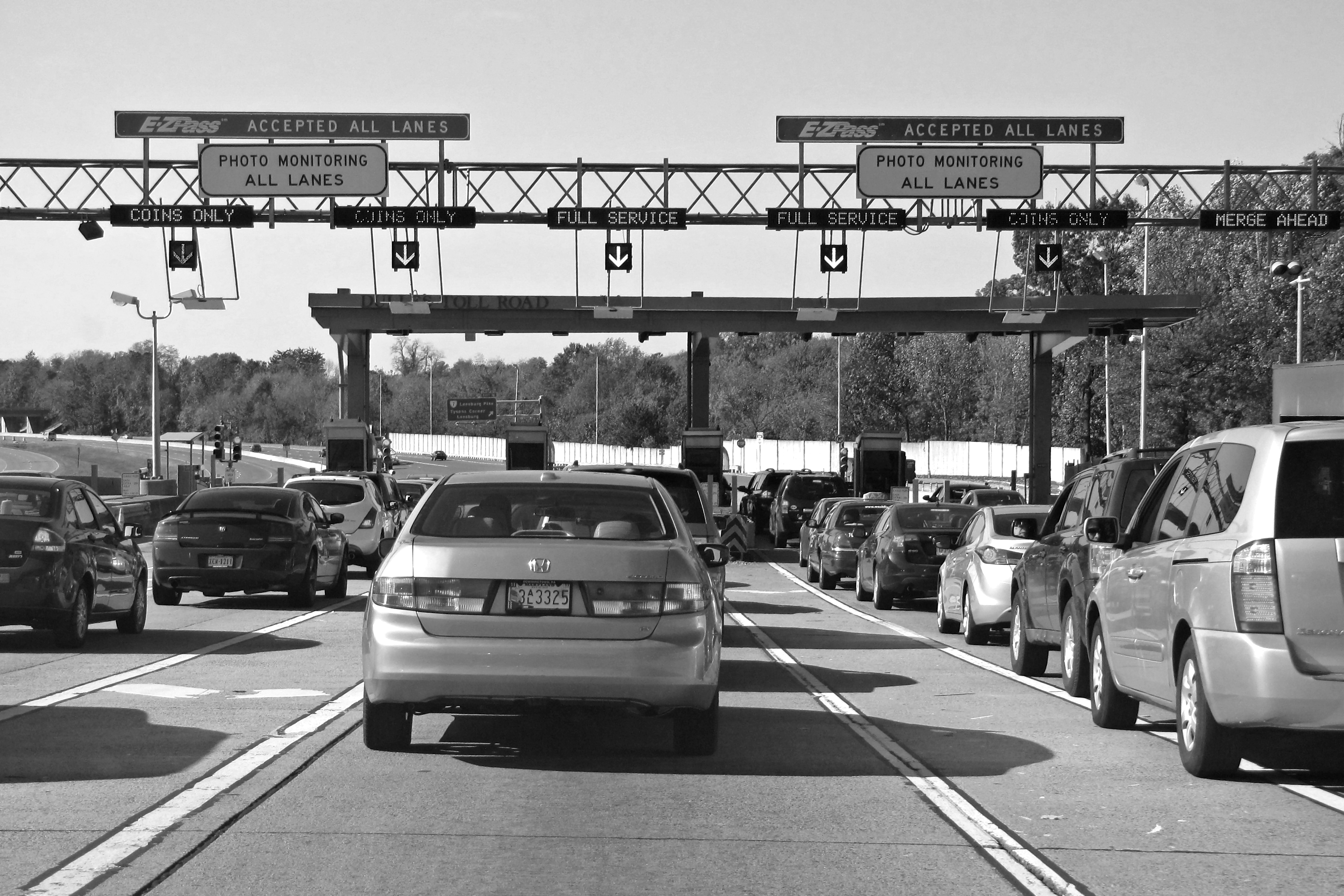
Mainline toll plaza at the eastern end of the Dulles Toll Road, just west of the interchange with the Capital Beltway.

HOV-2 restrictions are in effect during weekday rush hours, 6:30 to 9:00 am eastbound and 4:00 to 6:30 pm westbound, limiting the left lane to vehicles with two or more passengers between State Route 28 and the main toll plaza. Motorcycles and approved clean fuel vehicles displaying a Clean Special Fuel license plate are exempt from this rule, meaning single passenger vehicles of this nature may use the left lane. Traditional hybrid vehicles such as the Toyota Prius that do not plug in are no longer exempt from HOV rules. During rush hour, the appropriate directions of Interstate 66 between the Beltway and U.S. Route 29 just outside Washington are toll roads. Single-passenger vehicles bound to or from the airport using the Dulles Access Road must pay tolls using an E-ZPass. Vehicles with 2 or more people may switch their E-ZPass Flex into HOV mode to avoid being charged for tolls. These regulations are enforced by the Virginia State Police.

== Dulles Greenway ==
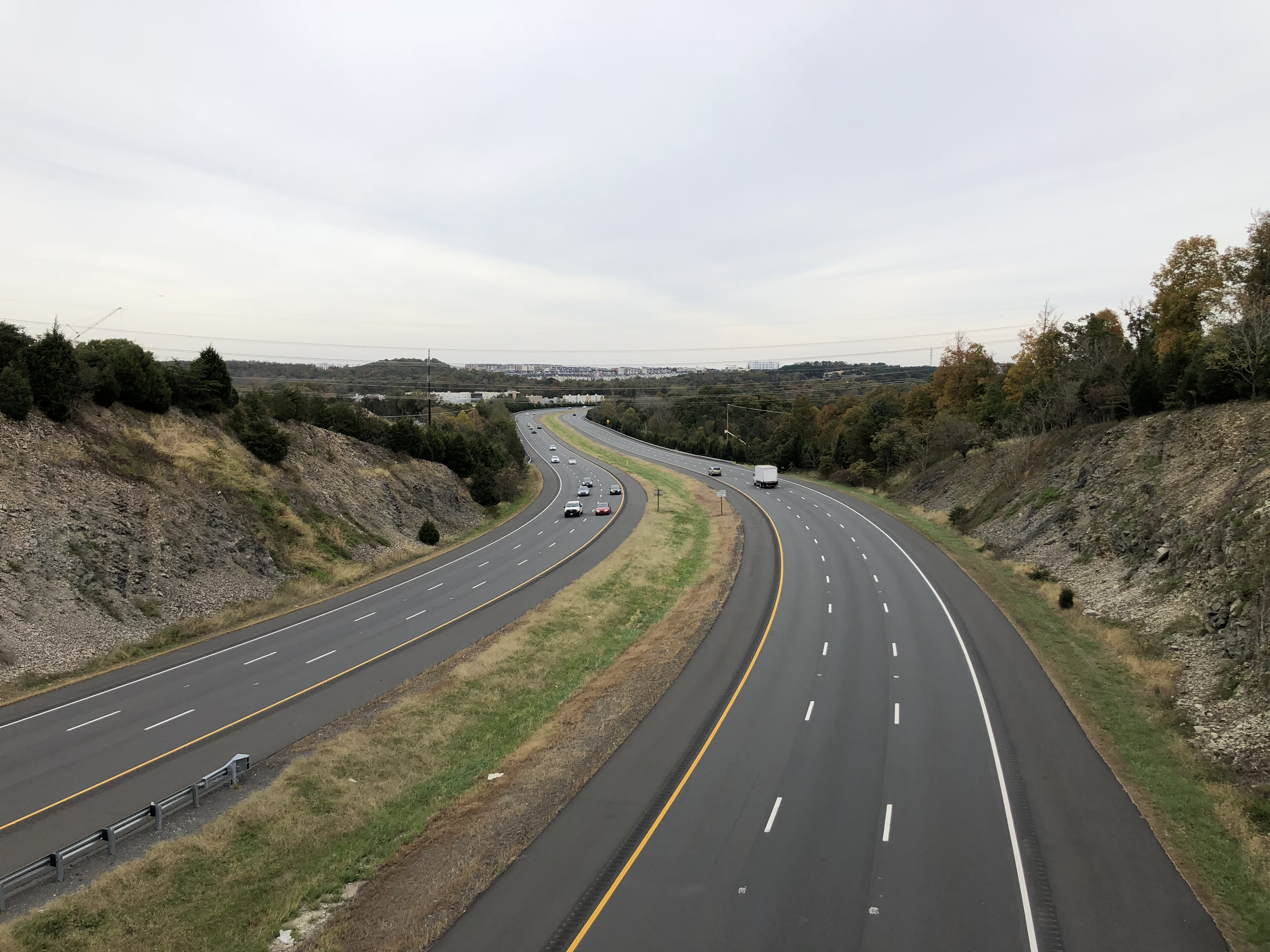
View east along the Dulles Greenway between Leesburg and Ashburn

The Dulles Greenway is a privately owned toll road in Northern Virginia, running for 12.53 miles (20.17 km) northwest from the end of the Dulles Toll Road to the Leesburg Bypass (U.S. Route 15/State Route 7). The northbound side of the freeway leads directly onto US-15 North at its termination, thus forming a continuous route towards Frederick, MD and onwards into southern Pennsylvania. Although privately owned, the highway is also part of SR 267. The speed limit is 65 miles per hour (105 km/h).

The road was privately built and is not a public asset. The current owner is "Toll Road Investors Partnership II" (TRIP II), which was a consortium of the Bryant/Crane Family LLC, the Franklin L. Haney Co., and Kellogg Brown & Root (KB&R). On August 31, 2005, Australian firm Macquarie Infrastructure Group (now Atlas Arteria) announced that they had paid $533 million to TRIP II to acquire its 86.7% ownership of the Greenway, and were negotiating with KB&R for the remaining ownership rights. Initially, as the road was built as a "Design Build Finance Operate Maintain" (DBFOM) project, the responsibility for operating the road was scheduled to revert to Virginia in 2036 via a concession agreement. In 2001, the Virginia State Corporation Commission extended this period to the year 2056.

=== History ===
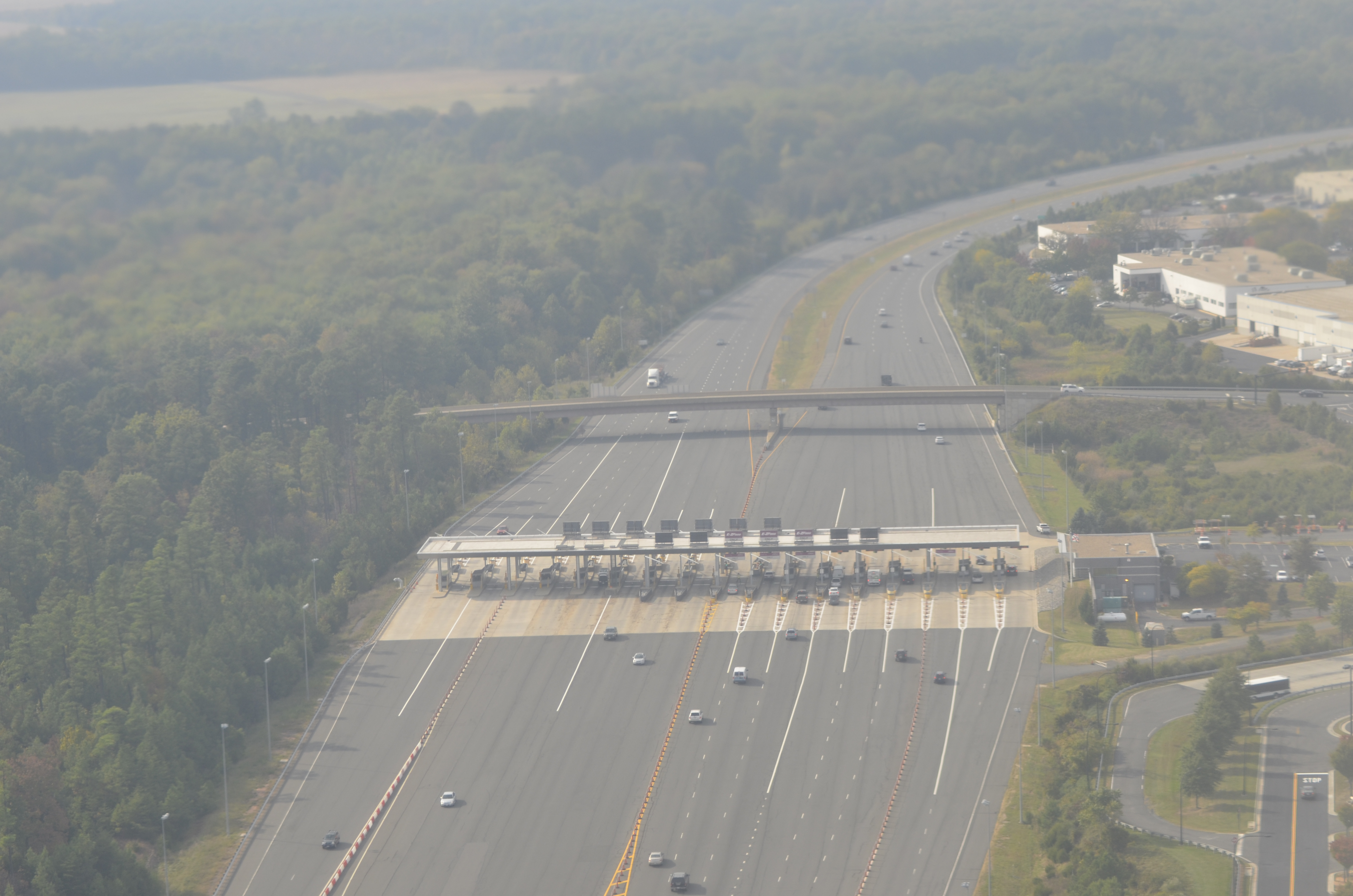
Aerial photo of the Dulles Greenway toll plaza

The road was envisioned as early as the 1970s, when new residents were attracted to Loudoun County because of the relatively low cost of real estate. The Greenway proposal prompted the enactment of the Virginia Highway Corporation Act of 1988 that authorizes the construction of new toll roads without the use of eminent domain under rates set by the Virginia Corporation Commission. The law requires the facility to be turned over to the state after a stated time period. The road was completed and opened in 1995, but the original owners defaulted on its loan due to lower than projected use. It receives no public funds, was built with no subsidies, and is policed at its own expense, competing as a wholly private enterprise with the state-built and -maintained roads. Tolls are computed to assure that the owner will recover the original investment plus a return on that investment. The losses incurred during the early years of the project are rolled forward to justify higher tolls in later years. Subsequent improvements, which were constructed in exchange for the aforementioned extension of the toll road to 2056, include adding a third lane in each direction, resurfacing the entire road in 2009, and the construction of an improved eastbound exit ramp to Dulles Airport in 2009.

=== Description ===
The main toll plaza for the Dulles Greenway is located just west of the exits for Route 28 and Dulles Airport. Additional toll plazas are located on westbound entrance ramps and eastbound exit ramps with the exception of Battlefield Parkway (Exit 2) in Leesburg. The toll varies depending on the toll plaza traversed. As of November 2025, the tolls for the main plaza, located at the eastern end of the road, are $5.25 during non-peak hours $5.80 during peak hours. Tolls for travelers who do not reach the main plaza are $4.55 during non-peak hours and $5.10 during peak hours. Vehicles traveling through the main toll plaza to or from the Dulles Toll Road are charged two tolls: one for the Dulles Toll Road, and one for the Dulles Greenway. Credit cards and E-ZPass transponder payments are accepted, with cash payments having been phased out in 2023.

The Greenway is also one of two routes where a subscription membership (exclusive to E-ZPass) allows for an additional discount. Free alternative routes include State Route 7 and State Route 28, both of which are generally more congested.

The Greenway was later widened to six lanes from the mainline toll plaza to Leesburg. Use of the Greenway has grown, reflecting the increased population of Loudoun County. In 1996, the Greenway served 6.3 million trips, growing to 21 million in 2006. However, for the first three months following the January 2009 toll increase, usage dropped 8% compared to the first three months of 2008.

=== Controversies ===
The 1988 statute authorizing the private toll road permitted toll increases above the rate of inflation under a three-part test: (1) the new fee must not "materially discourage" drivers from using the road, (2) the company must not make more than a "reasonable rate of return" from the increase, and (3) the road's benefit must match its cost. Representative Frank Wolf, the Congressman representing the area served by the road, stated, "It's highway robbery. It's a disgrace. Everyone knows that these tolls are ripping people off and there's not much we can do about it."

In 2025, an attempt by the Greenway's owners to raise tolls was stopped by Virginia’s State Corporation Commission and later the Virginia Supreme Court.

== Exit list ==
=== Dulles Toll Road and Dulles Greenway ===
SR 267 uses sequential exit numbering rather than the distance-based exit numbering used throughout most of Virginia.

County	Location	mi	km	Exit	Destinations	Notes
Loudoun	Leesburg	0.00	0.00	1	US 15 / SR 7 – Leesburg, Warrenton, Frederick, MD	Signed as exits 1A (south/west) and 1B (north/east)
Loudoun	Leesburg	1.14	1.83	2A	Battlefield Parkway	Signed as exit 2 eastbound; serves Leesburg Executive Airport
Loudoun				2B	Compass Creek Shopping Center	Westbound exit only, opened May 15, 2019)
Loudoun		3.22	5.18	3	SR 653 (Shreve Mill Road)	Tolled westbound entrance and eastbound exit
Loudoun	Ashburn	5.48	8.82	4	SR 659 (Belmont Ridge Road)	Tolled westbound entrance and eastbound exit
Loudoun	Ashburn	6.54	10.53	5	SR 901 (Claiborne Parkway) – Ashburn Farm, Broadlands	Tolled westbound entrance and eastbound exit
Loudoun	Ashburn	8.33	13.41	6	SR 772 – Ashburn, Broadlands	Tolled westbound entrance and eastbound exit
Loudoun	Ashburn	9.73	15.66	7	SR 607 (Loudoun County Parkway)	Tolled westbound entrance and eastbound exit
Loudoun	Sterling	10.81	17.40	8	SR 606 (Old Ox Road)	Tolled westbound entrance and eastbound exit; signed as exits 8A (west) and 8B (east)
Loudoun	Sterling	12.16	19.57	Dulles Greenway Mainline Plaza		
Loudoun	Sterling	12.54	20.18	9A	SR 28 south – Centreville, Dulles Airport	Tolled westbound exit and eastbound entrance; no westbound signage for Dulles Airport
Loudoun	Sterling	13.74	22.11	9B	SR 28 north – Sterling	Tolled interchange; westbound exit and eastbound entrance
Loudoun	Dulles	12.54– 13.98	20.18– 22.50	—	Dulles Airport (via Dulles Access Road)	No eastbound exit; eastbound access via exit 9A opened June 30, 2009
Loudoun	Dulles	13.98	22.50	Route transition between Dulles Greenway and Dulles Toll Road		
Fairfax	Herndon–McNair line	14.70	23.66	10	SR 657 – Herndon, Chantilly	Tolled westbound exit and eastbound entrance
Fairfax	Herndon–McNair line	15.45	24.86	—	Dulles Airport (via Dulles Access Road)	Westbound exit and eastbound entrance
Fairfax	Herndon–Reston line	16.43	26.44	11	SR 286 (Fairfax County Parkway) – Herndon / Monroe Park & Ride	Tolled westbound exit and eastbound entrance; no westbound exit to Park & Ride
Fairfax	Reston	17.40	28.00	12	SR 602 (Reston Parkway)	Tolled westbound exit and eastbound entrance
Fairfax	Reston	18.44	29.68	13	SR 828 (Wiehle Avenue)	Tolled westbound exit and eastbound entrance
Fairfax	Reston–Wolf Trap line	20.32	32.70	14	SR 674 (Hunter Mill Road)	Tolled westbound exit and eastbound entrance
Fairfax	Wolf Trap	20.78	33.44	—	Dulles Access Road east	Authorized buses only; eastbound exit and westbound entrance
Fairfax	Wolf Trap	21.76	35.02	—	Dulles Airport (via Dulles Access Road)	Westbound exit only
Fairfax	Wolf Trap	23.10	37.18	15	Wolf Trap National Park for the Performing Arts – The Barns, Center for Education	Westbound exit and eastbound entrance; access via SR 676
Fairfax	Tysons–Wolf Trap line	23.73	38.19	16	SR 7 (Leesburg Pike) – Leesburg, Tysons Corner	Tolled eastbound exit to SR 7 east; signed as exits 16A (east) and 16B (west) eastbound
Fairfax		24.18	38.91	Dulles Toll Road Main Toll Plaza		
Fairfax	Tysons–McLean line	24.36	39.20	17	SR 684 (Spring Hill Road)	Tolled interchange
Fairfax	Tysons–McLean line	24.90	40.07	—	Dulles Airport (via Dulles Access Road)	Westbound exit and eastbound entrance
Fairfax	Tysons–McLean line	25.96	41.78	18A	I-495 south / I-495 Express south – Richmond	Westbound entrance and eastbound exit; exits 45A-B on I-495
Fairfax	Tysons–McLean line	25.96	41.78	18B	I-495 north – Baltimore	Signed as exit 18 westbound; exits 45A-B on I-495
Fairfax	Tysons–McLean line	26.22	42.20	19	SR 123 (Chain Bridge Road) to I-495 south – McLean, Tysons Corner	Signed as exits 19A (south) and 19B (north); I-495 not signed eastbound
Fairfax	Tysons–McLean line	26.63	42.86	—	Dulles Airport (via Dulles Access Road)	Westbound exit and eastbound entrance; eastern terminus of Dulles Access Road
Fairfax	Tysons–McLean line	26.63	42.86	Eastbound toll gantry		
Fairfax	Pimmit Hills–McLean line			—	West Falls Church station	Authorized buses only; eastbound exit and westbound entrance
Fairfax	Pimmit Hills–McLean line	28.68	46.16	—	I-66 east – Washington	Exit 67 on I-66 west; tolled eastbound for non-HOV2+ vehicles during AM rush hours
1.000 mi = 1.609 km; 1.000 km = 0.621 mi: Incomplete access; Tolled; Route transition

=== Dulles Access Road ===
All exits are unnumbered.

County	Location	mi	km	Destinations	Notes
Loudoun	Dulles			Washington Dulles International Airport	Continues to airport terminals via Saarinen Circle
Loudoun	Dulles			Garage Parking, Cell Phone Lot, Hotel	Access via Aviation Drive
Loudoun	Dulles			SR 267 Toll west – Leesburg, Rental Car Return, Economy Parking	Eastbound exit only
Loudoun	Dulles			SR 28 to SR 7 / US 50 / I-66 west – Sterling, Centreville	Eastbound exit and westbound entrance
Loudoun	Dulles			Rental Car Return, Economy Parking, Cargo, Jet Aviation	No eastbound exit
Fairfax	Herndon–McNair line			SR 267 east to SR 657 / SR 286 (Fairfax County Parkway) – Herndon, Chantilly	To exits 10-11; eastbound exit and westbound entrance
Fairfax	Herndon–McNair line			SR 267 east / Reston Parkway / Wiehle Avenue / Hunter Mill Road	To exits 12-13-14; eastbound exit and westbound entrance
Fairfax	Wolf Trap			Dulles Toll Road west	Authorized buses only; westbound exit and eastbound entrance
Fairfax	Tysons–Wolf Trap line			SR 7 (Leesburg Pike) – Tysons Corner, Leesburg	Eastbound exit only; westbound entrance from Dulles Toll Road
Fairfax	Tysons–McLean line			To I-495 Express south / SR 123 (Chain Bridge Road)	Eastbound exit and westbound entrance to Dulles Toll Road
Fairfax	Tysons–McLean line			I-495 – Baltimore, Richmond	Eastbound exit only; exits 45A-B on I-495 (Capital Beltway)
Fairfax	Tysons–McLean line			To I-66 east – Washington	Lanes merge with Dulles Toll Road
1.000 mi = 1.609 km; 1.000 km = 0.621 mi: Incomplete access

== See also ==
- Dulles Technology Corridor
- Private highway
