= Private road =

Non-government owned road or street

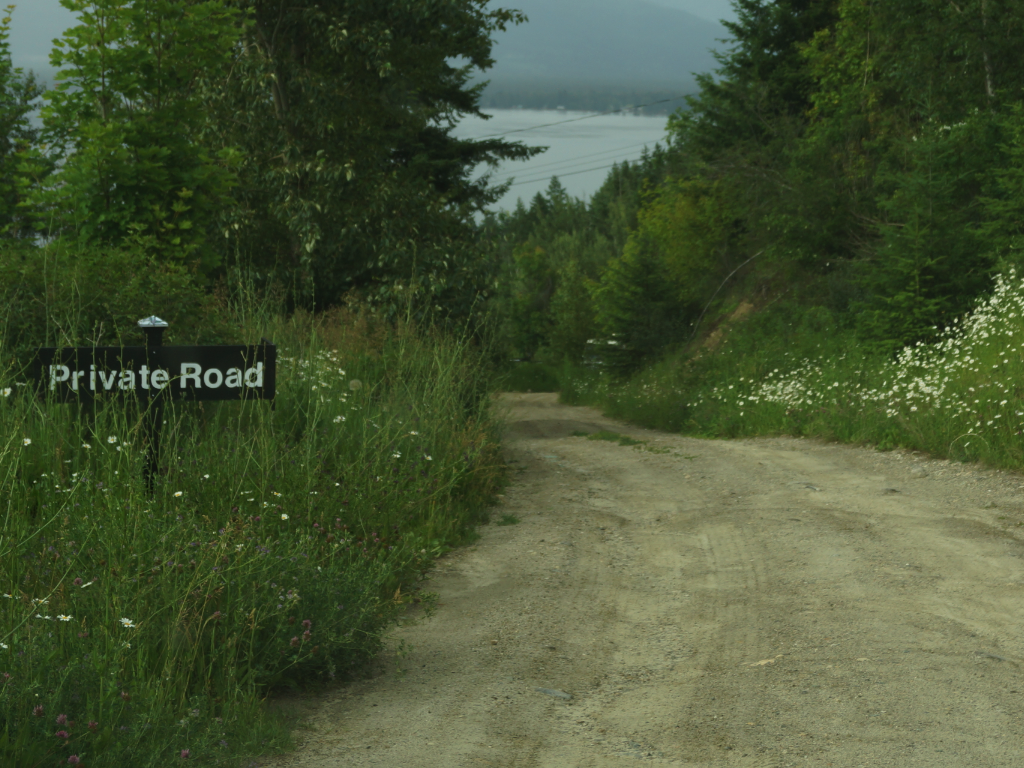
A private road in Canada

A private road is a road owned or controlled by a private person, persons or corporation rather than a road open to the public and owned by a government. Private roads can be on private land or can be constructed on government land for use by government agencies or by agreements for access to private facilities.

Private roads are private property and are not usually open to the public. Unauthorized use of a private road may be trespassing. In some cases, the owner of a private road may permit the general public to use the road. Road regulations that apply to a public road may not apply to private roads. Common types of private roads include roads retained in subdivisions of land but not dedicated to the public, residential roads maintained by a homeowners association, housing co-operative or other group of homeowners and roads for access to industrial facilities such as forests, mines, power stations and telecommunications.

== By country ==
=== Europe ===
In the Czech Republic and Slovakia, all roads of higher categories are public by law. Just the lowest category can be private. This category is called "účelová komunikace" ("účelová komunikácia" in Slovak), the adjective "účelový" can be translated as "purpose-built", special-purpose" or "utilitarian". The road law distinguish "publicly accessible" and "closed" (in a closed area) special-purpose roads. This category includes roads that are used exclusively to connect a private structure or plots to the road network, but also field and forest roads, areas such as car parks, public transport terminals, roads within industrial, military, hospital or school premises and areas etc. Private roads outside closed areas are largely subject to public law and public traffic on them can be restricted only with the consent of state authorities (public accessibility of the landscape is also protected by law). In most cases, they are not distinguished from municipal or regional roads by any signs.

England and Wales are thought to have about 40,000 private roads. They are not normally the responsibility of the local authority, but the authority may provide services such as street lighting. They normally have to be maintained by residents. They are referred to as unadopted roads because they have not gone through the statutory process of adoption, for example under Highways Act 1980 s37 or s38. Even if not expressly or implicitly dedicated for public use, public use over time may nonetheless have created public rights of way; though by Part 6 of the Natural Environment and Rural Communities Act 2006, in force from 2 May 2006, many public rights of way for motor vehicles in private roads have now been extinguished.

A Swedish yellow-red direction sign which points out that the destination, Loftbacken, is reached via a private road.

In Sweden, private road associations manage two thirds of the total road network. However, only four per cent of the total road transportation work is carried on them, mostly rural roads. In fact, only one per cent of the road transports are made on the half of the roads that do not receive government subsidies for their maintenance, with the bulk not receiving subsidies being built and maintained by the forestry industry as needed and most often closed to the public. New private roads that receive government support are often built by the government and transferred to the roads principal stakeholders, those living along it. These form a private road association to maintain it and get subsidies from the government to keep it open to the rest of the public. Even after factoring in the unpaid work of the members of the association, the cost of operation and maintenance is often considerably less than a comparable public road. Finland is similar, with 280,000 km of private roads and only 78,000 km of public roads.

There are networks of private highways in Italy and other nations. Such highways typically are toll roads whose upkeep is paid for with user fees, for example, the Dulles Greenway in Virginia, United States.

=== America ===
In Canada private roads are main access routes or private driveways onto private property. These roads are typically maintained by private owners of the land they occupy. Some private roads are maintained by a municipality and are open to the public. Many private roads do not have any name signage other than a sign indicating the ownership status; however, in some cities private roads are given conventional street names through the municipal addressing system. One notable private road, the Sultan Industrial Road in Northern Ontario, is 80 kilometres long and forms part of the only existing route between two major provincial highways; it is thus under a public access agreement permitting its use by the public, and nearly half of all traffic on the road in a 2016 study consisted of passenger vehicles rather than company trucks.

== See also ==
- Free-market road (concept of right-libertarian philosophies, especially anarcho-capitalism and minarchism)
- Private highway
- Private highways in the United States
- Dirt road
