= Wolf Trap, Virginia =

- Census-designated place
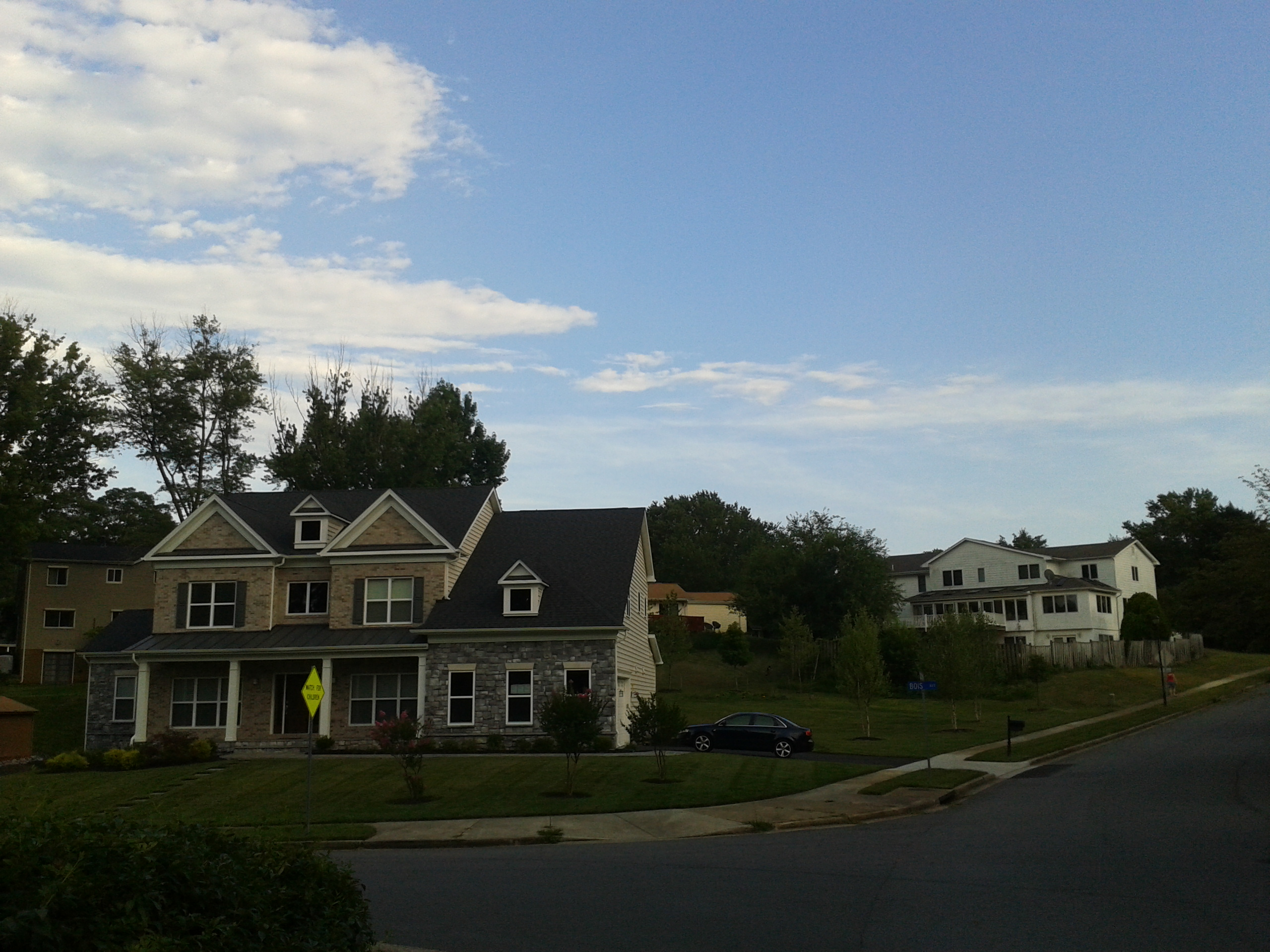
- Houses near the Barns at Wolf Trap

- Location of Wolf Trap in Fairfax County, Virginia

- Location within Northern Virginia Location within Virginia Location within the United States
- Coordinates: 38°56′1″N 77°16′35″W
- Country: United States
- State: Virginia
- County: Fairfax

Area
  - Total: 9.8 sq mi (25.5 km^{2})
  - Land: 9.8 sq mi (25.4 km^{2})
  - Water: 0.039 sq mi (0.1 km^{2})
- Elevation: 285 ft (87 m)

Population (2020)
  - Total: 16,496
  - Density: 1,646/sq mi (635.6/km^{2})
- Time zone: UTC−5 (Eastern (EST))
  - Summer (DST): UTC−4 (EDT)
- FIPS code: 51-87240
- GNIS feature ID: 1867602

Wolf Trap is a census-designated place (CDP) in Fairfax County, Virginia, United States. As of the 2020 census, Wolf Trap had a population of 16,496. Wolf Trap National Park for the Performing Arts is located in the CDP.

== Geography ==
Wolf Trap is located in northern Fairfax County at 38°56′1″N 77°16′35″W (38.933477, −77.276510). It is bordered by McLean to the northeast, Tysons Corner to the southeast, Vienna to the south, Oakton to the southwest, Reston to the west, and the community of Great Falls to the north. The Dulles Toll Road crosses the center of the CDP, with access from Exits 15 (Wolftrap Park) and 16 (Virginia State Route 7). The Toll Road leads west 11 miles (18 km) to Washington Dulles International Airport; downtown Washington, D.C. is 16 miles (26 km) to the east via the Toll Road and Interstate 66. Virginia Route 7 (Leesburg Pike) forms the northern border of the CDP; the highway leads northwest 20 miles (32 km) to Leesburg.

According to the United States Census Bureau, the Wolf Trap CDP has a total area of 9.8 square miles (25.5 km^{2}), of which 9.8 square miles (25.4 km^{2}) is land and 0.04 square miles (0.1 km^{2}), or 0.54%, is water.

== Demographics ==
Historical population
Census	Pop.	Note	%±
1980	9,875		—
1990	13,133		33.0%
2000	14,001		6.6%
2010	16,131		15.2%
2020	16,496		2.3%
U.S. Decennial Census; 2010 2020

=== Racial and ethnic composition ===
Wolf Trap CDP, Virginia – Racial and ethnic composition Note: the US Census treats Hispanic/Latino as an ethnic category. This table excludes Latinos from the racial categories and assigns them to a separate category. Hispanics/Latinos may be of any race.
Race / Ethnicity (NH = Non-Hispanic)	Pop 2000	Pop 2010	Pop 2020	% 2000	% 2010	% 2020
White alone (NH)	11,822	12,684	11,105	84.44%	78.63%	67.32%
Black or African American alone (NH)	245	261	287	1.75%	1.62%	1.74%
Native American or Alaska Native alone (NH)	16	18	2	0.11%	0.11%	0.01%
Asian alone (NH)	1,170	2,047	3,126	8.36%	12.69%	18.95%
Native Hawaiian or Pacific Islander alone (NH)	0	5	4	0.00%	0.03%	0.02%
Other race alone (NH)	32	34	116	0.23%	0.21%	0.70%
Mixed race or Multiracial (NH)	348	427	926	2.49%	2.65%	5.61%
Hispanic or Latino (any race)	368	655	930	2.63%	4.06%	5.64%
Total	14,001	16,131	16,496	100.00%	100.00%	100.00%

=== 2020 census ===
As of the 2020 census, Wolf Trap had a population of 16,496. The median age was 45.1 years. 25.4% of residents were under the age of 18 and 18.3% of residents were 65 years of age or older. For every 100 females there were 98.3 males, and for every 100 females age 18 and over there were 95.7 males age 18 and over.

100.0% of residents lived in urban areas, while 0.0% lived in rural areas.

There were 5,285 households in Wolf Trap, of which 42.2% had children under the age of 18 living in them. Of all households, 80.7% were married-couple households, 5.7% were households with a male householder and no spouse or partner present, and 12.0% were households with a female householder and no spouse or partner present. About 9.0% of all households were made up of individuals and 5.7% had someone living alone who was 65 years of age or older.

There were 5,420 housing units, of which 2.5% were vacant. The homeowner vacancy rate was 0.8% and the rental vacancy rate was 10.8%.

=== Demographic estimates ===
As of 2019, Census reports that the population density was 1,512.3 inhabitants per square mile (583.9/km^{2}).

=== Income and poverty ===
Census also reports that the 2019 median income for a household in the Wolf Trap CDP was $222,908 (based on 2014-2018 data).

== In popular culture ==
Wolf Trap is named as the location for the home of FBI Special Investigator Will Graham (Hugh Dancy) in NBC's 2013 TV series Hannibal, but the actual filmed location of the house is in the hamlet of Whitevale, Ontario.
