= Private highway =

Non-government owned road or street

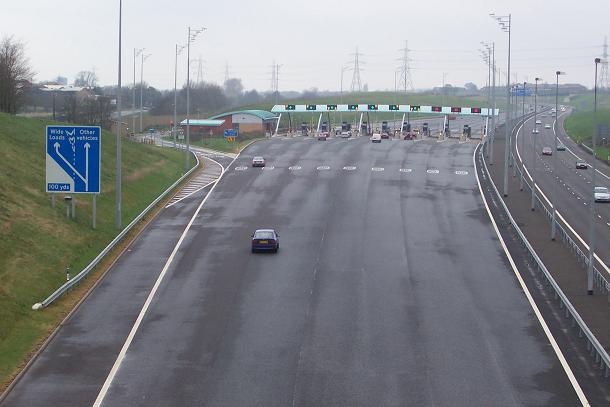
Toll plaza on the M6 Toll; the motorway is owned by a concession company

A private highway is a highway owned and operated for profit by private industry. Private highways are common in Asia and Europe; in addition, a few have been built in the United States on an experimental basis. Typically, private highways are built by companies that charge tolls for a period while the debt is retired, after which the highway is turned over to government control. This allows governments to fulfill immediate transportation needs despite their own budget constraints, while still retaining public ownership of the roads in the long term.

An obstacle to private highways is that government regulation can stifle price flexibility and introduce negotiation and paperwork requirements that increase operational expenses, while having to compete against free public roads. In addition, private highways lack some advantages that governments have, such as sovereign immunity against liability for accidents, the use of eminent domain power to acquire private property for roads and the ability to issue tax-exempt securities.

Free-market roads are generally advocated by Libertarians, who consider them safer and more cost-effective than government operated roads.

== History ==
The Interstate Highway System provided for in the Federal Aid Highway Act was a federally funded, non-toll system. According to Simon Hakim and Edwin Blackstone, "by 1989, [private] roads comprised just 4,657 miles (7,495 km) of the 3.8 million miles (6.1 million km) of streets and roads in the United States and only 2,695 miles (4,337 km) out of the 44,759 miles (72,033 km) of the interstate system."

== Recent trends ==
The National Center for Policy Analysis and the Cato Institute have proposed that the Demsetz auctions commonly used to award franchises be replaced with Present Value of Revenues auctions in order to reduce risk and thus required rates of return by private highway owners. Under this system, contractors would bid an amount equal to the present value of cash flows from user fees they are willing to accept for the project. The lowest bid would win.

Boarnet and DiMento believe that private highways will become more important as the rise of gasoline-efficient hybrids causes a decline in gas tax revenues.

Many highways are constructed under a "build-operate-transfer" model in which ownership ultimately goes to the government.

== Around the world ==
=== Asia ===
As of 2003, the Hong Kong government was planning to securitize five toll tunnels and a toll bridge through bond issues. India also had a private highway under-construction between the two cities of Bangalore and Mysore in the state of Karnataka. A vast number of the country's road projects have been upgraded under a public-private partnership, thus operating similar to private highways. In Indonesia, many toll roads are built by private companies, and private toll roads are being built in Bangladesh.

=== North America ===
Mexico has some highways operated by private companies. In Canada, the 108 km Highway 407 ETR through the Greater Toronto Area is operated privately under a 99-year lease agreement with the provincial government. The highway uses electronic toll collection. Users who do not have a toll tag (called a transponder) in their vehicle are tracked by automatic number plate recognition, with the toll bill being mailed to the address of the plate on file. There are also some private highways in the United States.

=== Europe ===
Of the 11,000 kilometers of France's highways, 8,000 km are under private concession. 3,120 kilometers of Italy's highways (comprising 56% of the country's toll roads) are controlled by Autostrade Concessioni e Costruzioni Autostrade. According to Forbes, "Autostrade was an early Electronic Age entry, computerizing to its highway system in 1988". The M6 Toll was the first private toll motorway in the United Kingdom. The project was described by urbantransport-technology.com as a "43 km dual three lane (plus hard shoulder), £485.5 million motorway" with six toll stations.

== See also ==
- Private road
- Private highways in the United States
- Road pricing
- Shunpiking
- Toll road
- Toll roads around the world
