= Atlas Arteria =

Private toll road developer and operator

- Type: Public
- Traded as: ASX: ALX; S&P/ASX 200 component
- Predecessor: Macquarie Infrastructure Group
- Founded: 2010
- Website: www.atlasarteria.com

Atlas Arteria (ASX: ALX), formerly known as Macquarie Atlas Roads, is one of the world's largest developers and operators of private toll roads.

== Intoll demerger ==
Macquarie Infrastructure Group (MIG) had a portfolio of 11 toll roads across seven countries including Australia. MIG had previously in June 2006 spun off Sydney Roads Group which included its stake in three Sydney toll roads, namely M4 Western Motorway (50.61%), M5 South-West Motorway (50%) and Eastern Distributor (71.35%). Sydney Roads Group was sold to Transurban in April 2007.

In February 2010 MIG underwent a restructure into two separately listed companies; Intoll and Macquarie Atlas. Whilst Macquarie Atlas continues to be managed by Macquarie, Intoll is internally managed. Murray Bleach is the chief executive officer of Intoll. At the time, Intoll (ASX: ITO) owned and managed a 25% interest in the Westlink M7 in western Sydney, Australia and a 30% interest in the 108 km-long 407 Express Toll Route in the Greater Toronto Area of Canada. Intoll was acquired in full by Canada Pension Plan Investment Board (CPPIB) on 14 December 2010.

In 2018, Macquarie Atlas Roads changed its name to Atlas Arteria after an agreement with the Macquarie Group to bring management in-house.

in 2022, Atlas Arteria bought a $ 2bn stake in Chicago Skyway.
