= Ballston–Hunting Point Line =

Bus route between Hunting Point and Ballston

A12
- Ballston–Hunting Point Line

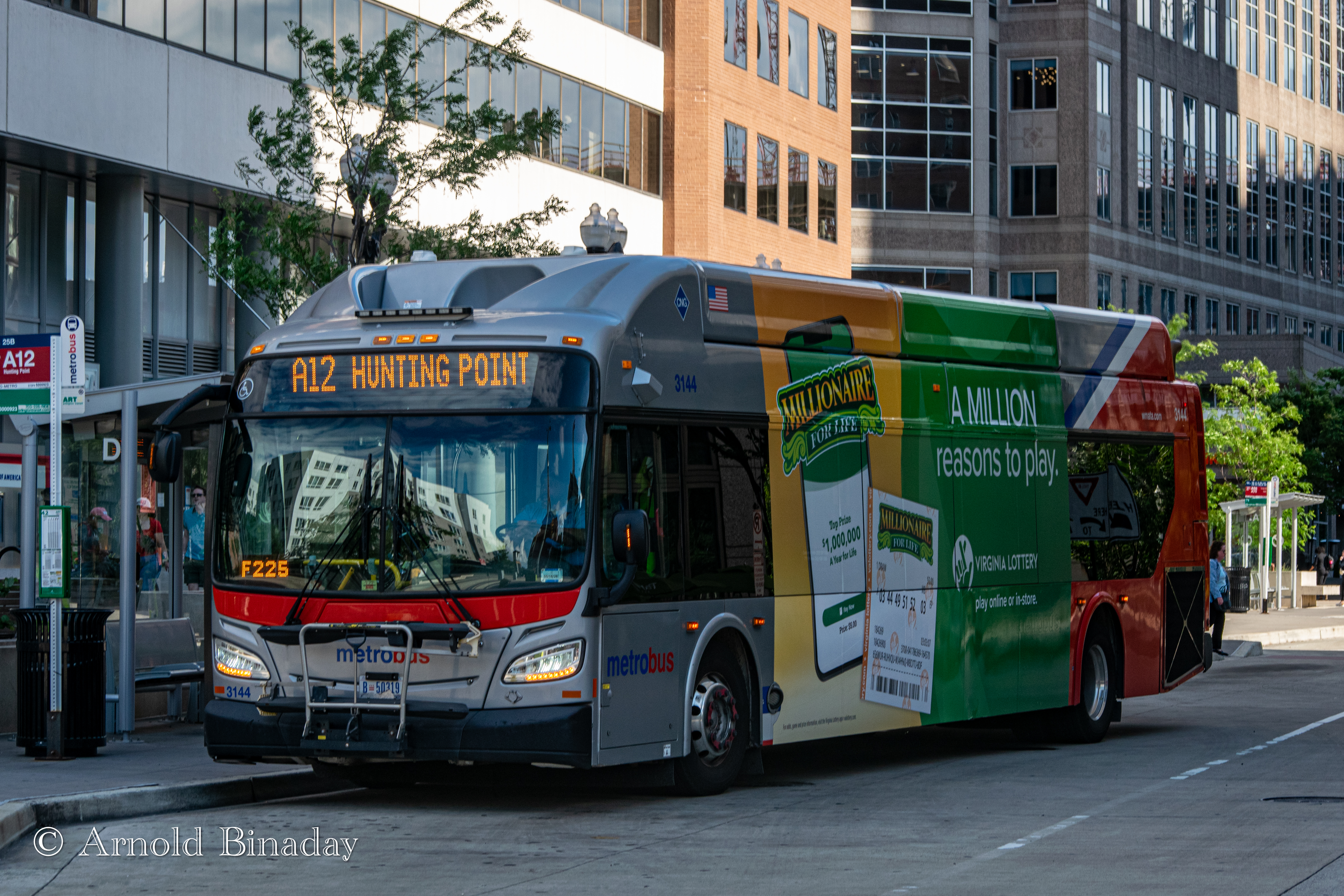
- Route A12 at Ballston–MU

Overview
- System: Metrobus
- Operator: Washington Metropolitan Area Transit Authority
- Garage: Four Mile Run
- Livery: Local
- Status: In Service
- Began service: December 31, 2001
- Predecessors: 10C, 10D (before December 31, 2001); 10B (2001–2025)

Route
- Locale: Fairfax County; City of Alexandria; Arlington County
- Communities served: Huntington, Old Town Alexandria, Del Ray, Parkfairfax, Arlandia, Avalon Bay, Shirlington, Nauck, Arlington Heights, Buckingham, Ballston
- Landmarks served: Hunting Point, Braddock Road station, The Village at Shirlington, Shirlington Transit Center, Ballston Quarter, Ballston–MU station
- Start: Hunting Point
- Via: Glebe Road, 2nd Street South, Walter Reed Drive, South Kenmore Street, Shirlington Road, Mount Vernon Avenue, Washington Street
- End: Ballston–MU station

Service
- Level: Daily
- Frequency: 30 minutes 45-60 minutes (Daily Evening Service)
- Operates: 4:45 AM – 1:32 AM (Weekdays); 5:45 AM – 1:34 AM (Saturdays); 5:45 AM – 11:38 PM (Sundays)
- Ridership: 603,499 (FY 2025)
- Transfers: SmarTrip only
- Timetable: Hunting Point–Ballston Line

The Ballston–Hunting Point Line, designated as Route A12, is a daily bus route operated by the Washington Metropolitan Area Transit Authority between Hunting Point and Ballston–MU station of the Orange and Silver lines of the Washington Metro. This line provides service within the neighborhoods in Fairfax County, Alexandria, and Arlington County. Alongside the neighborhoods, it also brings service through the marketplace, businesses, and offices within the counties.

== Route and service ==
The A12 operates from Four Mile Run Division 7 days a week. The A12 operates between Hunting Point and Ballston station via Mount Vernon Avenue, Washington Street, Walter Reed Drive, and Glebe Road. The A12 runs through the neighborhoods in the City of Alexandria, such as Arlandia and Old Town, within Mount Vernon Avenue. The A12 also runs through the neighborhoods in Arlington County, such as Ballston, Buckingham, Arlington Heights, Shirlington, and Avalon Bay. Within the neighborhoods, the A12 runs through marketplaces, businesses and offices in the City of Alexandria and Arlington County.

== History ==
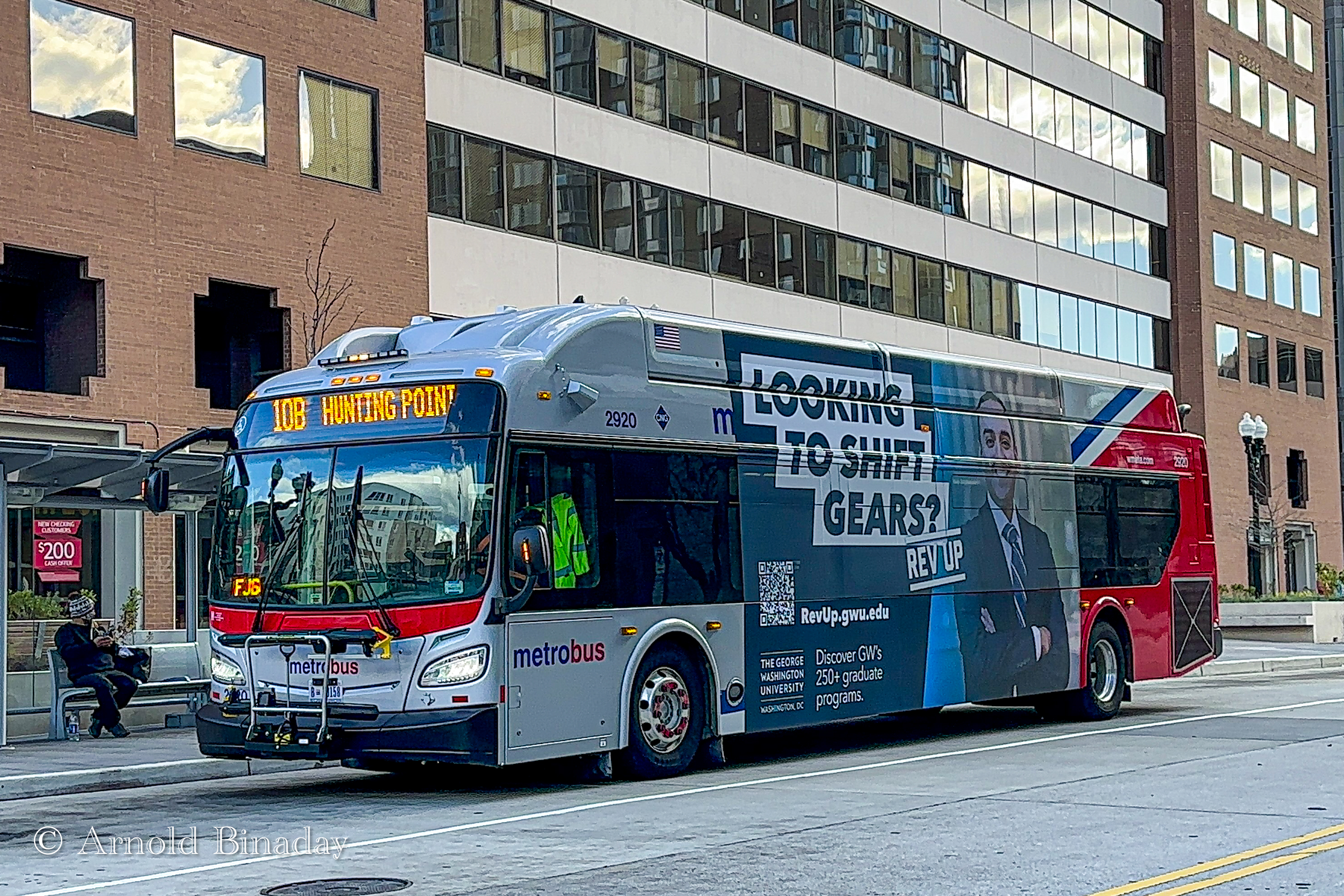
Former Route 10B at Ballston–MU in 2024

The Hunting Point–Ballston Line was introduced in 2001, as route 10B, during the simplification of the 10 line. The 10B was once originally part of the Alexandria–Arlington–Pentagon Line (now Alexandria–Pentagon Line) with other routes from the 10 line, until the line splits into two lines in the 1990s. Prior to WMATA's Better Bus Redesign network, the A12 designation was served in Prince George's County, Maryland, as part of the Martin Luther King Jr. Highway Line.

=== Alexandria–Arlington Line ===
The 10B started its service as part of the Alexandria–Arlington Line, alongside service of the 10C and the 10D following the split with routes 10A and 10E in the 1990s. From the split, the 10B operated from Virginia Hospital Center in Arlington Virginia to Hunting Towers, with select trips operating up to Old Town Alexandria near Braddock Road Station. The 10C operates between East Falls Church Station and Hunting Towers, while the 10D operates on the same interval, with the extension to Seven Corners Center. The 10C operates during weekdays, while the 10D operates only on Saturdays.

The 10B was shortened to terminate at Ballstom station, discontinuing service to Lee Heights (N George Mason Drive & Langston Blvd.) and all 10C and 10D were elominated on December 30, 2001, and replaced by Arlington Transit routes 51 and 52. Following these changes, the line was renamed to Hunting Towers–Ballston Line until 2012, when the line is renamed to Hunting Point–Ballston Line.

=== Hunting Point–Ballston Line ===
On December 30, 2001, the 10B was rerouted to operate via Arna Valley (now Avalon Bay) and Shirley Park. This brings in more service at Shirley Park, where the 10B can connect to routes 22A, 22B, 22C, and 22F of the Walker Chapel–Pentagon Line. Service on South Glebe Road between West Glebe Road and Arlington Ridge Road is provided by routes 23A and 23C of the McLean–Crystal City Line.

=== Later Changes ===
In 2013, WMATA proposed two options for the 10B.

- The first option was to discontinue the Arlington Heights portion of the 10B and reroute to operate via South Glebe Road. The 10B would also discontinue service at the neighborhood of Nauck, operate via Douglas Park on Walter Reed Drive, and serve Arlington Mill Drive before heading to Shirlington Bus Station. The 10B will also further modify its service, by eliminating service at Parkfairfax to operate via Interstate 395 and South Glebe Road, leading to discontinuing residential service to Arna Valley.
- The second option was similar to the first option, although the 10B will continue to provide service in the neighborhoods of Nauck and Parkfairfax. On this option, only service at Arlington Heights and Arna Valley is proposed to be discontinued.

Outside of the changes of the 10B, WMATA is also proposing to add a new MetroExtra route, the 10X, to operate alongside the 10B. The new 10X will operate on limited stop, bringing faster service from the 10B during peak hours. Unlike the 10B, the 10X will not operate via the neighborhood of Nauck, Shirlington, Mount Vernon Avenue, and Braddock Road station, however, it brings in service via Jefferson Davis Highway (now Richmond Highway).

The reason why WMATA planned these changes was to make the 10B reliable and to reduce travel times towards Ballston–MU station. The 10X would make the line more reliable, when there is faster service on Glebe Road.

On March 30, 2014, the 10B was rerouted back to South Glebe Road, where it originally operated before December 30, 2001. Service to Arna Valley is provided by Arlington Transit route 87. These changes also occurred to reduce redundancy with ART 87.

On June 26, 2016, all late-night short 10B trips were converted to full route trips to adjust the travel times of the route. The 10B will no longer end at Washington Street and Pendleton Street on late nights, and will continue to operate until Hunting point.

Due to the West Glebe Road bridge construction, service was rerouted through Interstate 395 on December 30, 2018. Route 10B no longer operates through Parkfairfax.

During the COVID-19 pandemic, Route 10B began operating on its Saturday schedule beginning on March 16, 2020. However beginning on March 18, 2020, the route was further reduced to operate on its Sunday schedule. Also beginning on March 21, 2020, weekend service was suspended. On August 23, 2020, Route 10B full service was restored.

Due to rising cases of the COVID-19 Omicron variant, the line was reduced to its Saturday service on weekdays. Full weekday service resumed on February 7, 2022.

As part of WMATA's Better Bus Redesign taking place on June 29, 2025, the 10B was renamed into the A12, taking the route number from the former Martin Luther King Jr. Highway Line.
