= Virginia Square, Virginia =

Area in Northern Virginia

Virginia Square
- Section of a Neighborhood
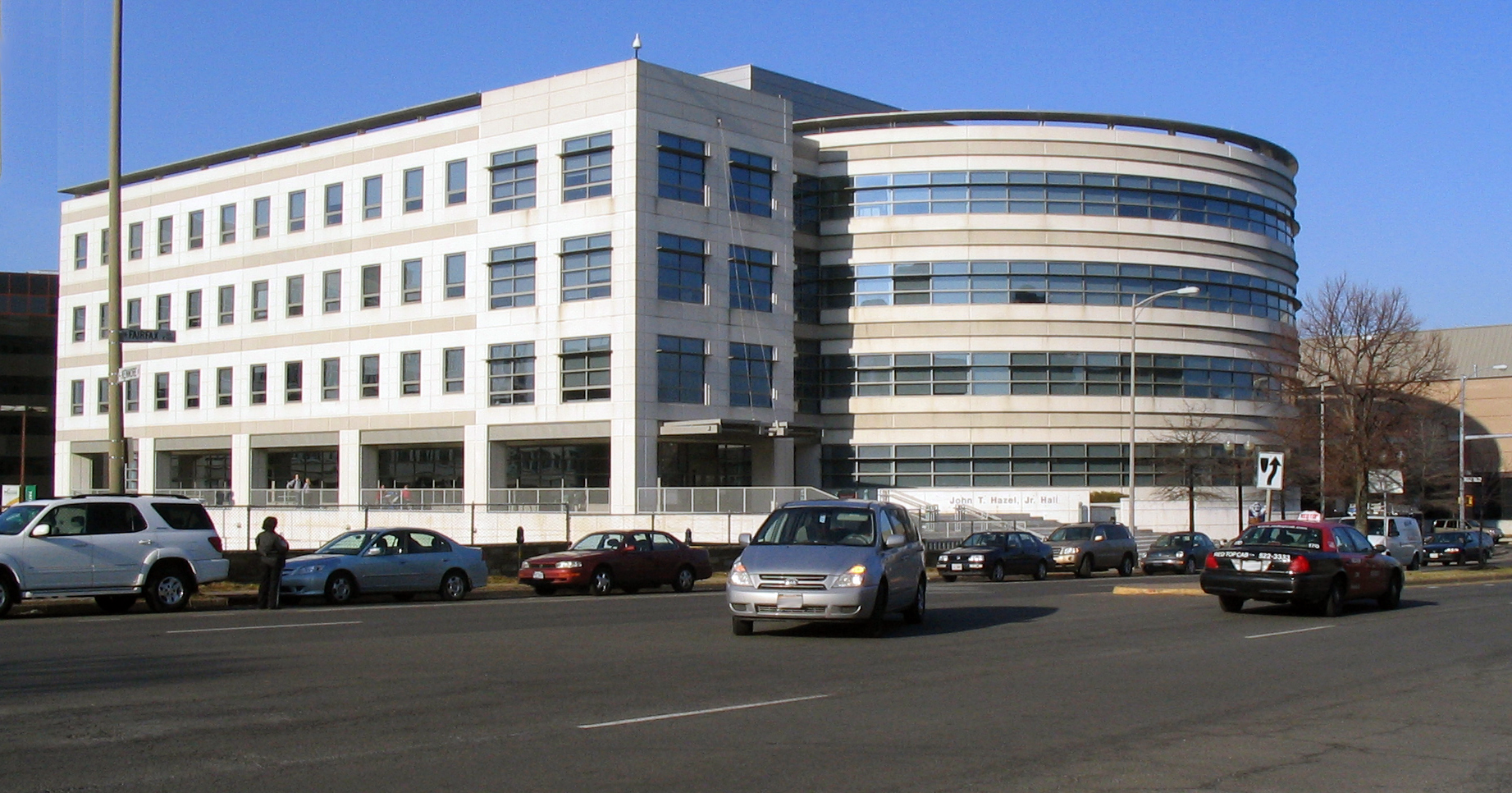
- Antonin Scalia Law School at George Mason University in Virginia Square

- Location of Virginia Square in the Washington metropolitan area
- Coordinates: 38°53′10″N 77°06′30″W
- Country: United States of America
- State: Virginia
- County: Arlington
- Time zone: UTC-5 (EST)
  - Summer (DST): UTC-4 (EDT)
- ZIP Codes: 22201
- Area code: 703

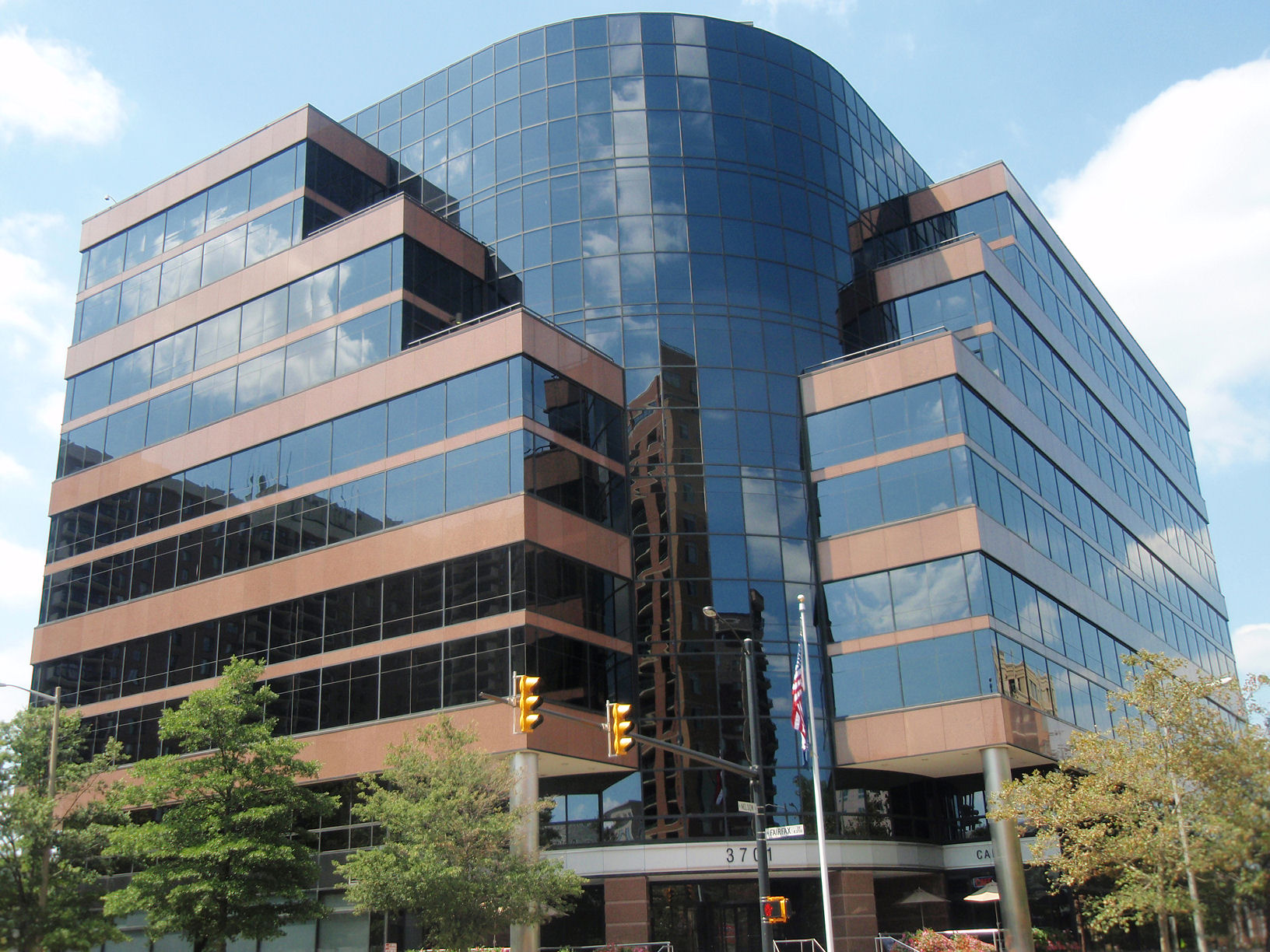
Former DARPA headquarters

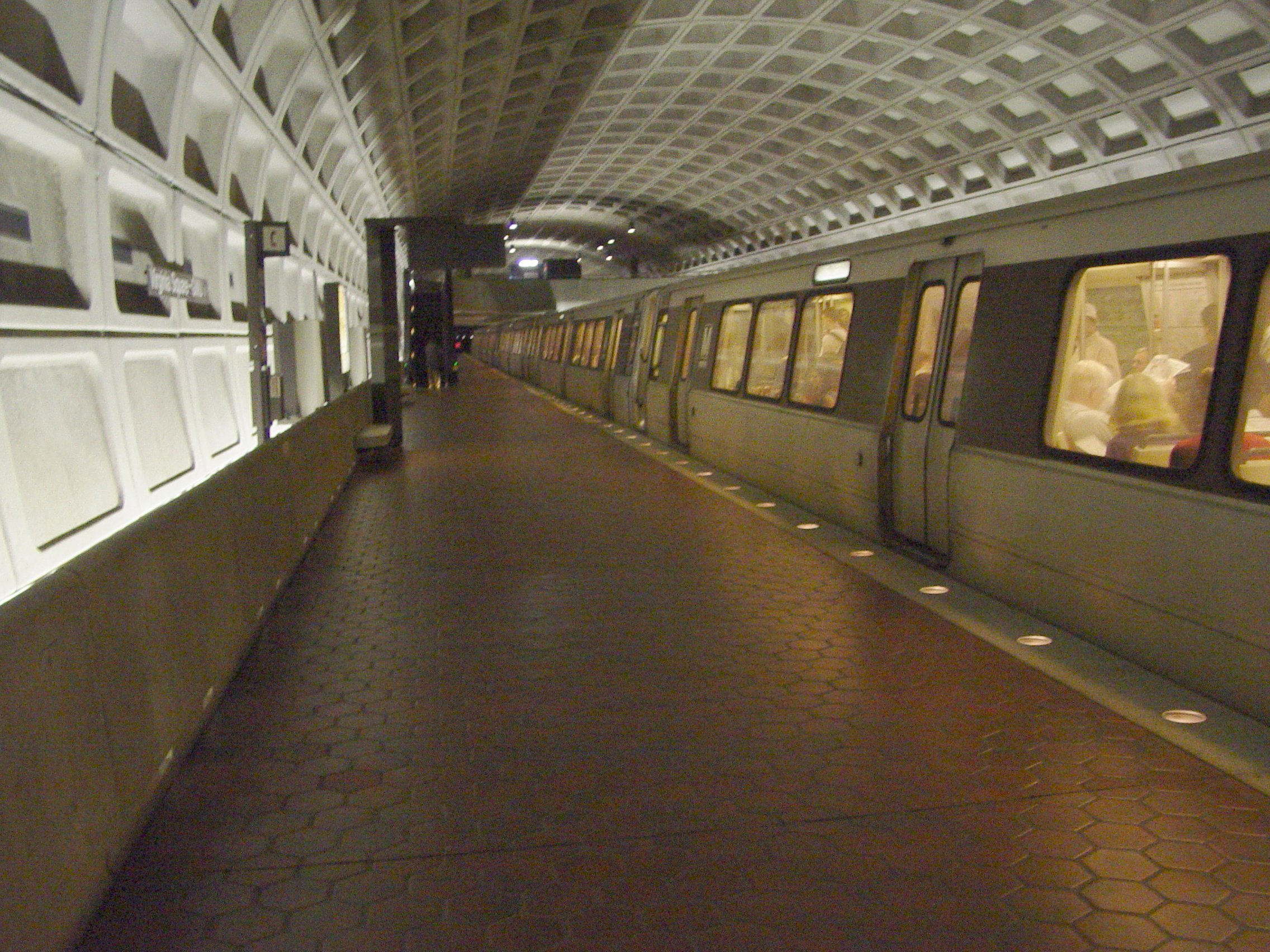
Virginia Square–GMU station

Virginia Square is a section in the Ballston neighborhood of Arlington County, Virginia. It is centered at the Virginia Square–GMU station on the Orange and Silver lines of the Washington Metro subway system between Clarendon and Ballston. The neighborhood consists of a mix of high-rise apartments, garden apartments, and single-family homes that date back to the 1930s.

Virginia Square is home to the Arlington campus of George Mason University, including its Law School and the Schar School of Policy and Government, the Arlington Arts Center, some offices of the Federal Deposit Insurance Corporation (FDIC), and the main branch of the Arlington Public Library. The area's name is derived from the former Virginia Square Shopping Center, now occupied mainly by a major satellite office of the FDIC with a Giant supermarket on part of the property. Among local restaurants, Mario's Pizza has been a landmark since 1957 and El Pollo Rico since 1988.

Ballston-Virginia Square Partnership was a business development organization inclusive of both Ballston proper and the Virginia Square section.
