= MedStar Capitals Iceplex =

Practice arena of the Washington Capitals

Coordinates: 38°52′43″N 77°6′37″W

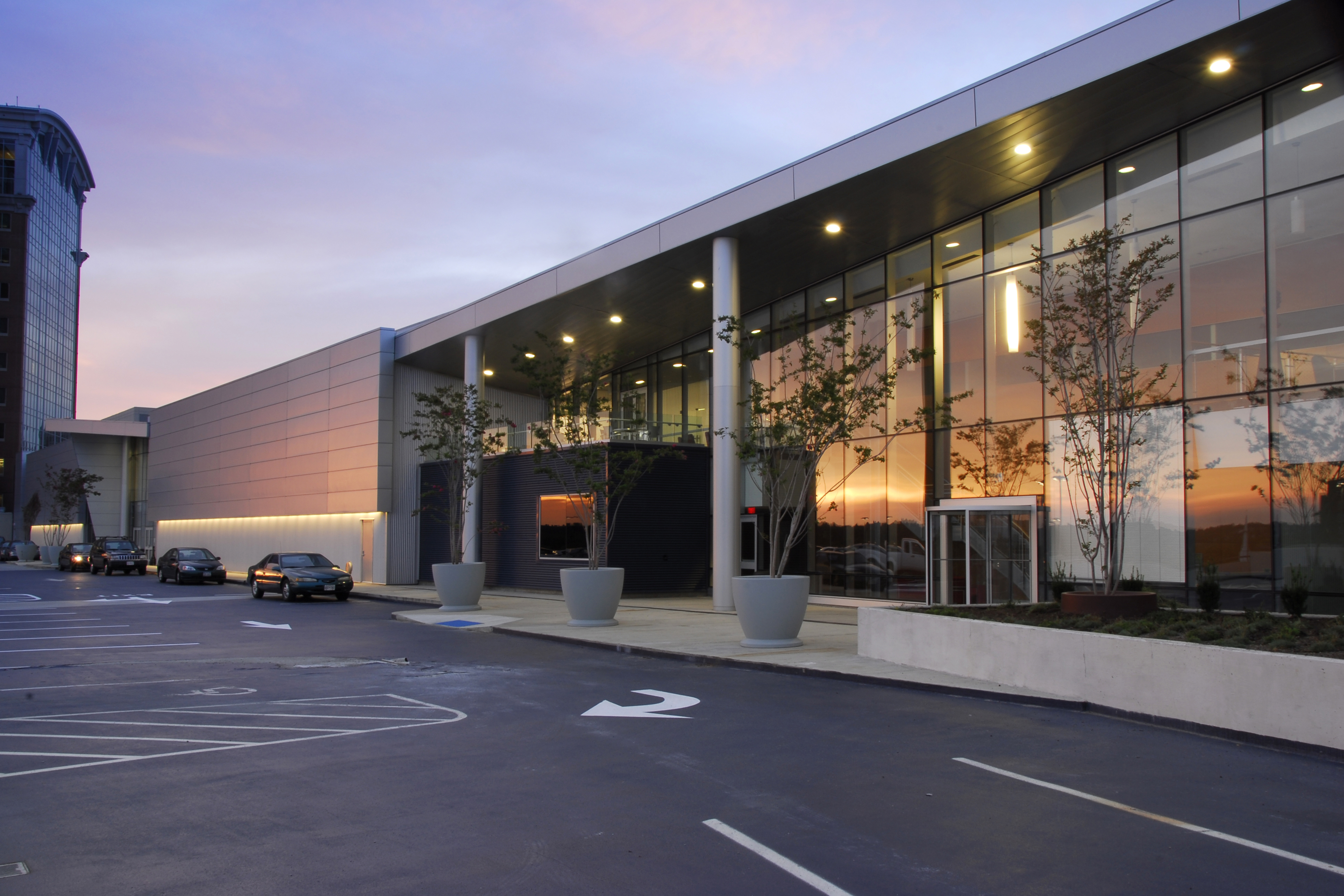
- MedStar Capitals Iceplex in August 2007
- Interactive map of MedStar Capitals Iceplex
- Former names: Kettler Capitals Iceplex; Ballston Ice Arena
- Location: Ballston, Virginia, U.S.
- Owner: Monumental Sports & Entertainment
- Public transit: Washington Metro at Ballston–MU

Construction
- Opened: November 2006
- Cost: $42.8 million
- Architect: William R. Drury

Tenants
- Washington Capitals (NHL, practice facility); Georgetown Hoyas (ACHA); NOVA Cool Cats special hockey team; DC Sled Sharks

MedStar Capitals Iceplex is the practice arena of the Washington Capitals of the National Hockey League. The highest ice rink above street-level in the United States, it is located on the eighth floor atop the parking garage adjoining the Ballston Quarter in the Ballston neighborhood of Arlington County, Virginia.

The Capitals spend about 300 hours annually practicing at the arena, which has 12,000 hours of ice time available annually. The Iceplex also serves as the home ice for the club teams of Georgetown University and George Washington University. The Iceplex also runs an adult league for amateur hockey players. It is regularly available for recreational use, and hosts "Learn to Skate" camps and lessons throughout the year.

The Iceplex is also home to the NOVA Cool Cats special hockey team, which practices and has home games at the IcePlex, and the DC Sled Sharks, a sledge hockey team for physically disabled youths 18 and under, which plays in the Delaware Valley Sled Hockey League.

The Iceplex served as the initial inspiration for the building of LECOM Harborcenter in Buffalo, New York by the Buffalo Sabres and Terrence Pegula. LECOM Harborcenter serves a similar purpose to the IcePlex.

== History ==
=== 21st century ===
The building was designed by William R. Drury of the Reston, Virginia–based firm, Architecture, Incorporated, and completed in November 2006 at a cost of $42.8 million. It is built to LEED standards, though was not registered with the Green Building Council to receive a certification. It is not fully handicapped accessible. The facility totals 137,000 square-feet and includes two indoor NHL-sized ice rinks, office space, 8 player locker rooms, a full-service ProShop, a Capitals Team Store, a snack bar, and spaces for special events. In addition, it includes a 20,000 square foot training center for the Capitals, containing an athletic-training and medical facilities, a weight room and fitness room, a locker room and lounge area, a high-tech theatre-style classroom and a video room.

Originally named Ballston Ice Arena, it was renamed Kettler Capitals Iceplex by Washington metropolitan area real estate developer Robert C. Kettler. His firm, KSI Services, bought the naming rights to the arena on November 1, 2006, for seven years at $400,000 per year. The arena opened with its first practice 10 days later. In 2010, the Arlington County Board recognized the facility in the inaugural DESIGNArlington awards. The facility continued to bear Kettler's name until weeks after the Capitals won their first Stanley Cup in 2018, when MedStar Health bought the naming rights in a 10-year agreement together with the other Monumental Sports & Entertainment practice facilities.
