= Museum of Contemporary Art Arlington =

Coordinates: 38°52′54″N 77°06′07″W

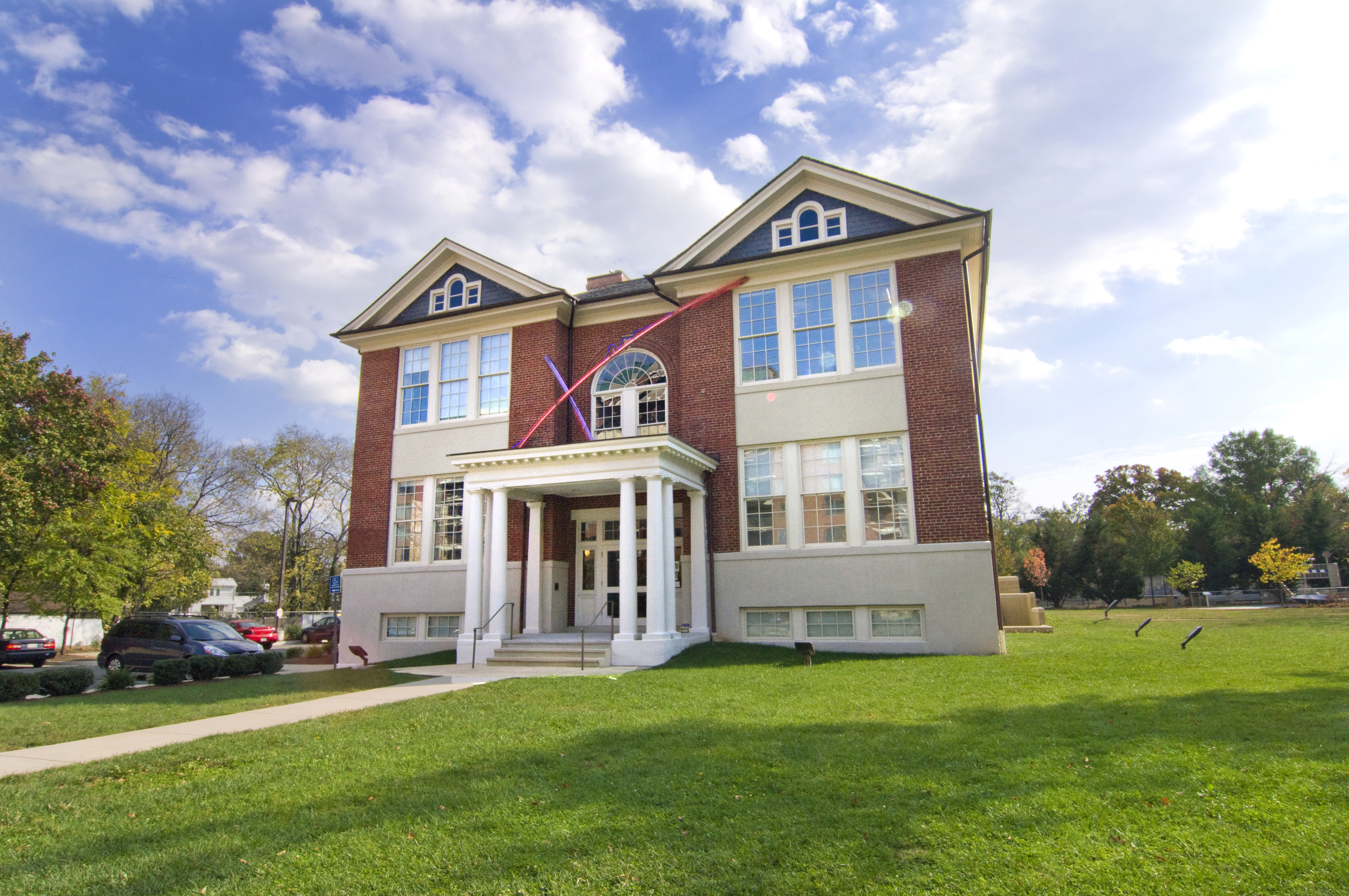
- Former name: Arlington Arts Center
- Established: 1974
- Location: 3550 Wilson Boulevard, Arlington County, Virginia, 22201, U.S.
- Type: Contemporary art museum
- Director: Catherine Anchin
- President: Carrie Schum
- Public transit access: Washington Metro at Virginia Square
- Website: www.mocaarlington.org

The Museum of Contemporary Art Arlington (MOCA Arlington) is a non-collecting contemporary art museum and visual arts center in the Virginia Square neighborhood of Arlington County, Virginia, established in 1974.

Housed since 1976 in the historic Maury School (formerly the Clarendon School), it presents artwork by regional artists in the Mid-Atlantic. The museum hosts exhibitions, educational programs and subsidized studio spaces, and seeks to increase awareness, appreciation of, and involvement in the visual arts in Arlington County and the Washington metropolitan area. At 17,000 square feet, the facility includes nine exhibition galleries, working studios for twelve artists and two classrooms, and is one of the largest non-federal venues for contemporary art in the Capital Region. Formerly the Arlington Arts Center (AAC), the center rebranded as MOCA Arlington in September 2022.

== Exhibitions ==
MOCA Arlington organizes around 12 exhibitions a year. Exhibition proposals are announced and submissions are reviewed by the exhibitions committee, which includes notable artists, critics, curators, and collectors. After the selection of those artists, solos, juried and curated exhibitions are planned, resulting in a sampler of art in a variety of media. The museum also exhibits themed shows, usually twice per year. These shows usually grab the attention of local arts publication writers and arts bloggers. The Washington Post, Pink Line Project and DCist usually cover the shows. Themed shows are generally accompanied by programming that helps explain the exhibition (sometimes they can be really theoretical) and gives the artist’s perspective to the audience.

== Education ==
MOCA Arlington offers classes for adults, teens and children to help the beginners or the professional to improve their artistic skills. The teachers are professional artists and many of whom have achieved the highest degrees in their field. The classes are about photography, sculpture, painting or drawing. Moreover, the museum offers classes for home-schooled children but also bilingual classes for students who want to learn and practice another language.

== Studio Residency ==
MOCA Arlington rents subsidized studio space for 12 artists where they can work and express themselves in an artistic community. The selection is based on artistic merit, potential for collaborative outreach to the community, and diversity of artist representation. The artists come from across the US and abroad for periods from one week to six weeks residencies.
