= Dunn Loring station =

Washington Metro station

Dunn Loring Merrifield
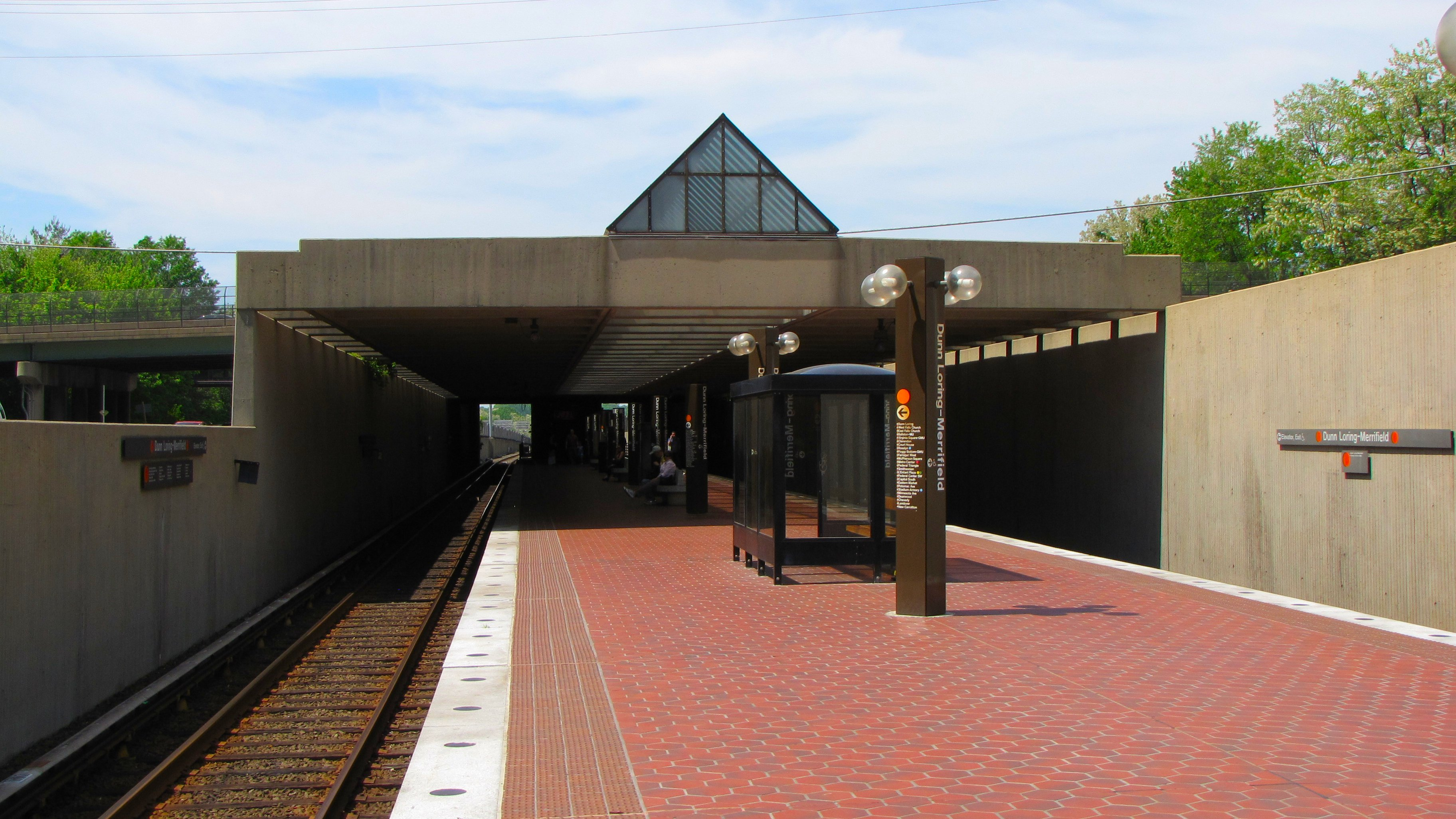
- Dunn Loring station platform in May 2010 facing west

General information
- Location: 2700 Gallows Road; Merrifield, Virginia, U.S.
- Coordinates: 38.8833529°N 77.2281200°W
- Owner: Washington Metropolitan Area Transit Authority
- Platforms: 1 island platform
- Tracks: 2
- Bus stands: 7
- Bus operators: Metrobus: F50, F62; Fairfax Connector: 401, 402, 462, 467, 671, 672

Construction
- Structure type: At-grade
- Parking: 2,000 spaces
- Cycle facilities: Capital Bikeshare, 40 racks, 34 lockers
- Accessible: Yes

Other information
- Station code: K07

History
- Opened: June 7, 1986; 40 years ago
- Rebuilt: 2020
- Former names: Dunn Loring (1986–1998, 2011–present); Dunn Loring–Merrifield (1998–2011)

Passengers
- 2025: 2,233 (average weekday)
- Rank: 73 of 98

Services
Preceding station	Washington Metro	Following station
Vienna Terminus	Orange Line	West Falls Church toward New Carrollton
Route map
Location

Dunn Loring station (announced with the subtitle as Dunn Loring–Merrifield) is a Washington Metro station in Fairfax County, Virginia, on the Orange Line. The station is in Merrifield, with a Vienna mailing address. The station is in the median of Interstate 66 at Gallows Road, just outside the Capital Beltway, and is accessed by a footbridge over the eastbound lanes.

== History ==
The station opened on June 7, 1986. Its opening coincided with the completion of 9.1 miles (14.6 km) of rail west of the Ballston–MU station and the opening of the East Falls Church, West Falls Church and Vienna stations. By 1993, officials in Fairfax City were looking to add "Merrifield" to the station name. In 1998, the station name was changed to Dunn Loring–Merrifield. On November 3, 2011, the station returned to its original name, with "Merrifield" listed as a subtitle.

In May 2018, Metro announced an extensive renovation of platforms at twenty stations across the system. The platforms at the Dunn Loring station would be rebuilt starting in mid-2020.

From May 23 until September 7, 2020, this station was closed due to the platform reconstruction project which closed stations west of Ballston–MU station.

On June 3, 2023, this station was closed for track replacement, affecting stations west of Ballston–MU station. Service resumed on July 17, 2023.

== Development project ==
In August 2011, Mill Creek Residential Trust, in cooperation with WMATA, began development on a new mixed-use development area known as Alexan Dunn Loring. The project was required to not reduce the number of parking spaces available to Metro riders. The first completed step was to remove the existing kiss and ride area, as well as the bus bays. This area became the primary Metro parking lot, while the old parking lot was built into a new parking garage. The new parking garage opened in August 2013. After the parking garage opened, construction began on the mixed-use development in the area of the temporary parking lot. Phase 1 of the mixed-use development project was scheduled to be completed in the first quarter of 2014. Construction was expected to be completed in 2015.
