= Ballston, Virginia =

Neighborhood in Virginia, US

Ballston, Arlington, Virginia
- Neighborhood
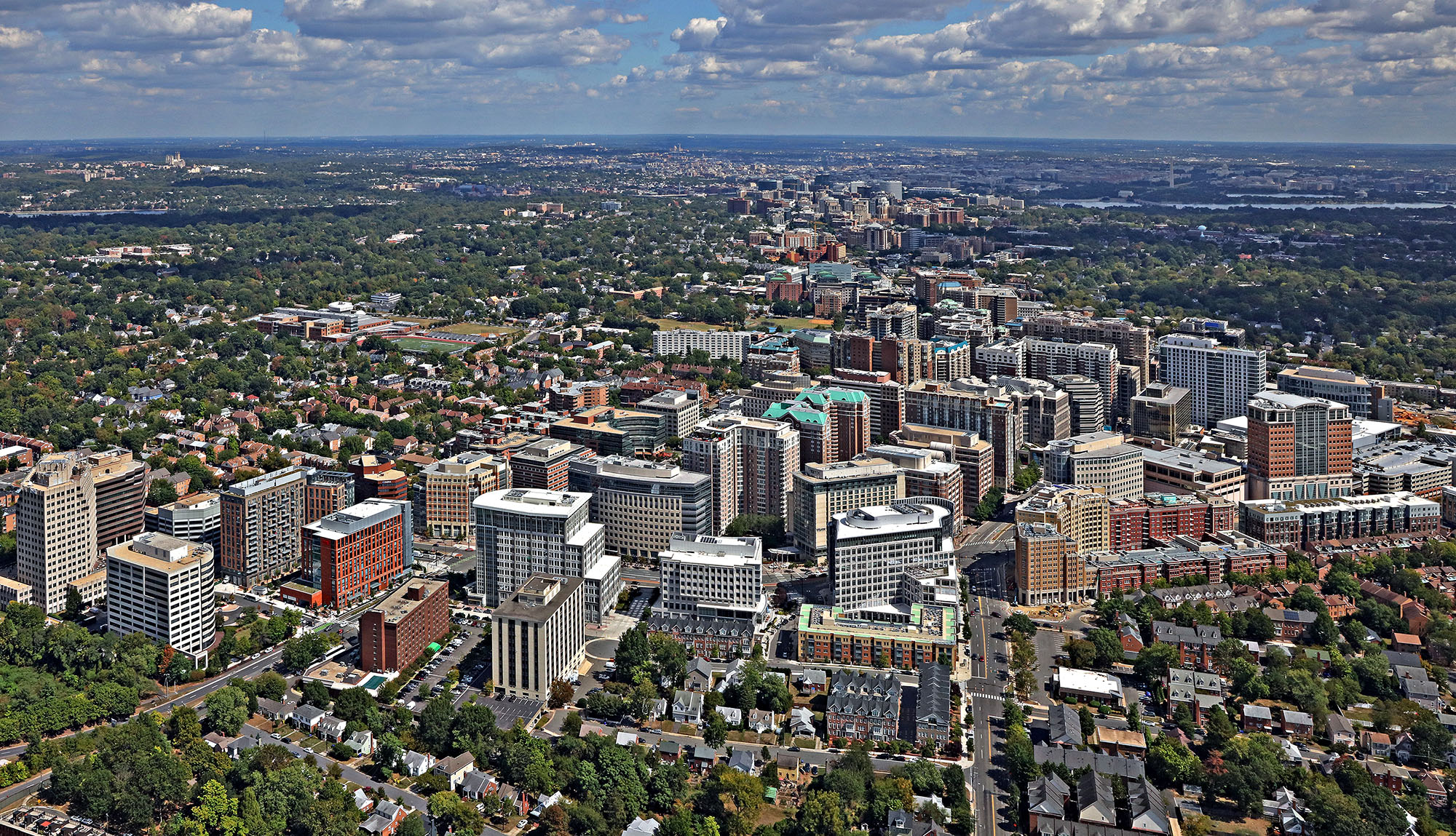
- The skyline of Ballston in September 2019

- Location of Ballston in Northern Virginia Ballston, Arlington, Virginia (Virginia) Ballston, Arlington, Virginia (the United States)
- Coordinates: 38.881831°N 77.111292°W
- Country: United States of America
- State: Virginia
- County: Arlington
- Time zone: UTC-5 (EST)
  - Summer (DST): UTC-4 (EDT)
- ZIP Codes: 22203
- Area code: 703
- Website: www.ballstonva.org

Ballston is a neighborhood in Arlington County, Virginia, United States. Ballston is located at the western end of the Rosslyn-Ballston corridor. It is a major transportation hub and has one of the nation's highest concentrations of scientific research institutes and research and development agencies, including DARPA, the Office of Naval Research, the Advanced Research Institute of Virginia Tech, the Air Force Research Laboratory, and engineering, management, and public sector consulting firms. Ballston includes a section known as Virginia Square and sometimes the area is collectively known as Ballston-Virginia Square.

Ballston proper is served by the Ballston–MU station, and the Virginia Square section of Ballston is served by the Virginia Square-GMU station, both of which are on the Orange and Silver Lines of the Washington Metro. By some measures, Ballston is the densest neighborhood in the Washington metropolitan area.

== History ==
=== 18th century ===
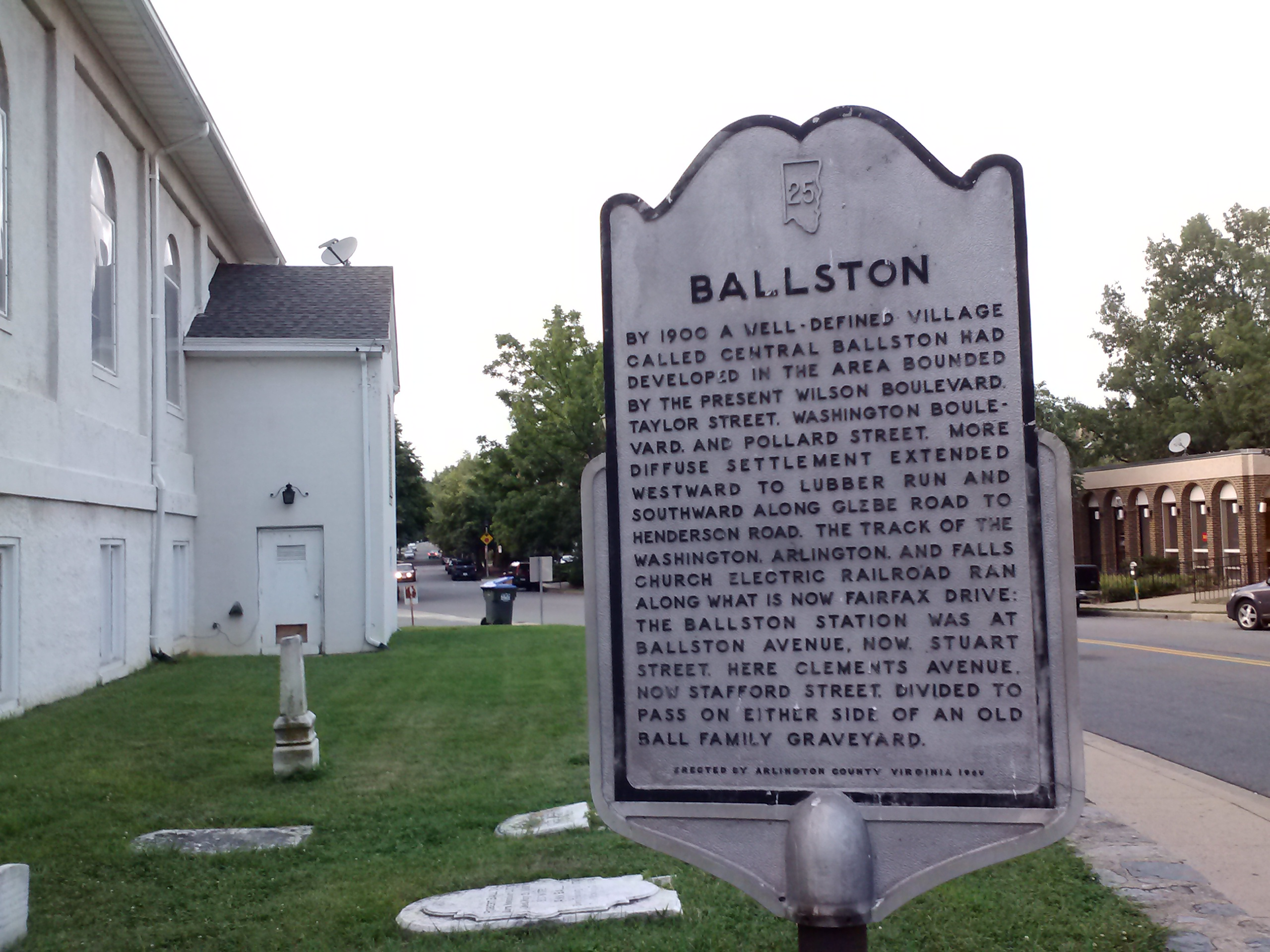
A Ballston historical marker in July 2013

Ballston is named after the Ball family, and one of their family cemeteries lies in the neighborhood at N. Stafford Street and Fairfax Drive, also known as VA State Route 237. Ballston began as Birch's Crossroads, and later became Ball's Crossroads at what is now the intersection of N. Glebe Road and Wilson Boulevard.

A historical marker that stands near the southeastern corner of the intersection reads:

This intersection has been a focal point since about 1740, when two roads were developed, one from the future site of Alexandria to the mouth of Pimmit Run, the other from Awbury’s Ferry (at the site of Rosslyn) to The Falls Church. The first came to be known as the Glebe Road because it passed the glebe of Fairfax Parish and in order to distinguish it from other roads to the Falls. The second was eventually named Wilson Boulevard in honor of President Wilson. The intersection became known as Ball’s Crossroads when Ball’s Tavern was established here in the early 1800s.

=== 19th century ===
In 1896, an interurban electric trolley line, the Fairfax line of the Washington, Arlington and Falls Church Railway (WA&FC), began operating north of the crossroads along the present route of Fairfax Drive, whose name derives from that of the trolleys' final destination, Fairfax City. Construction of the trolley line, which branched at Clarendon to serve both Rosslyn and downtown Washington, D.C., temporarily shifted much of the area's development away from the crossroads.

=== 20th century ===
A historical marker near the northwestern corner of Fairfax Drive and N. Stafford Street, one block east of the Ballston–MU station, at the former site of the Ballston trolley station, states:

By 1900, a well-defined village called Central Ballston had developed in the area bounded by the present-day Wilson Boulevard, Taylor Street, Washington Boulevard, and Pollard Street. More diffuse settlement extended westward to Lubber Run and southward along Glebe Road to Henderson Road.

The track of the Washington, Arlington, and Falls Church Electric Railroad ran along what is now Fairfax Drive; the Ballston Station was at Ballston Avenue, now North Stuart Street. Here Clements Avenue, now Stafford Street, divided to pass on either side of an old Ball family graveyard.

The Ball family burial ground on Washington Boulevard has a historical marker, which states:

Old Ball Family Burial Ground. This is one of Arlington's oldest family burial grounds. Ensign John Ball (1748–1814), a veteran of the American Revolution (Sixth Virginia Infantry) is buried here. John Ball was the son of Moses Ball, who was one of the pioneer settlers in the Glencarlyn area of Arlington. Also buried here in the cemetery are many of John Ball's direct and collateral descendants including John Wesley Boldin, a Civil War soldier (Company D, Third Pennsylvania Cavalry) and members of the Marcey, Stricker, Donaldson, and Croson families.

In 1912, a competing interurban electric trolley line, the Washington and Old Dominion Railway constructed a branch that crossed the WA&FC near the west end of Ballston, then called Lacey, near a WA&FC car barn and railyard. Interstate 66 and the Bluemont Junction Trail now follow the route of this railroad branch between Rosslyn and the Washington and Old Dominion Railroad Regional Park in Bluemont Park. A historical marker entitled "Lacey Car Barn" located near the northwest corner of N. Glebe Road and Fairfax Drive states:

In 1896, the Washington, Arlington & Falls Church Railway began running electric trolleys from Rosslyn to Falls Church on the present routes of Fairfax Drive and I-66. By 1907, the Fairfax trolley linked Fairfax, Vienna, and Ballston with downtown Washington, D.C. In 1910, at this location, the railway built a car barn, railyard, workshops, electrical substation, and general office. In 1912, the rival Washington and Old Dominion Railroad began crossing the tracks on a bridge 200 yards west of here, following the present route of I-66 from Rosslyn. The Fairfax trolley closed in 1939, but Metrorail’s Orange Line follows its route through Arlington.

In 1951, the Parkington Shopping Center opened at the intersection, formerly known as Balls Crossroads on the site of present-day Ballston Quarter. Parkington was anchored by the headquarters location of the Hecht Company, and was reputed to have the largest parking garage in the nation when it opened.

Ballston began to redevelop rapidly after the Washington Metropolitan Area Transit Authority (WMATA) opened the Orange Line's Ballston Metrorail station on December 1, 1979, and when an entrance to Interstate 66 (I-66) opened on December 22, 1982.

Ballston contains a section known as Virginia Square, which takes its name from the Virginia Square Shopping Center that once stood there. Virginia Square is served by the Virginia Square–GMU station. Ballston and Virginia Square-GMU metro stations are within a 1/2 mile walking distance from each other. The area is sometimes collectively known as Ballston-Virginia Square.

== Shopping and recreation ==
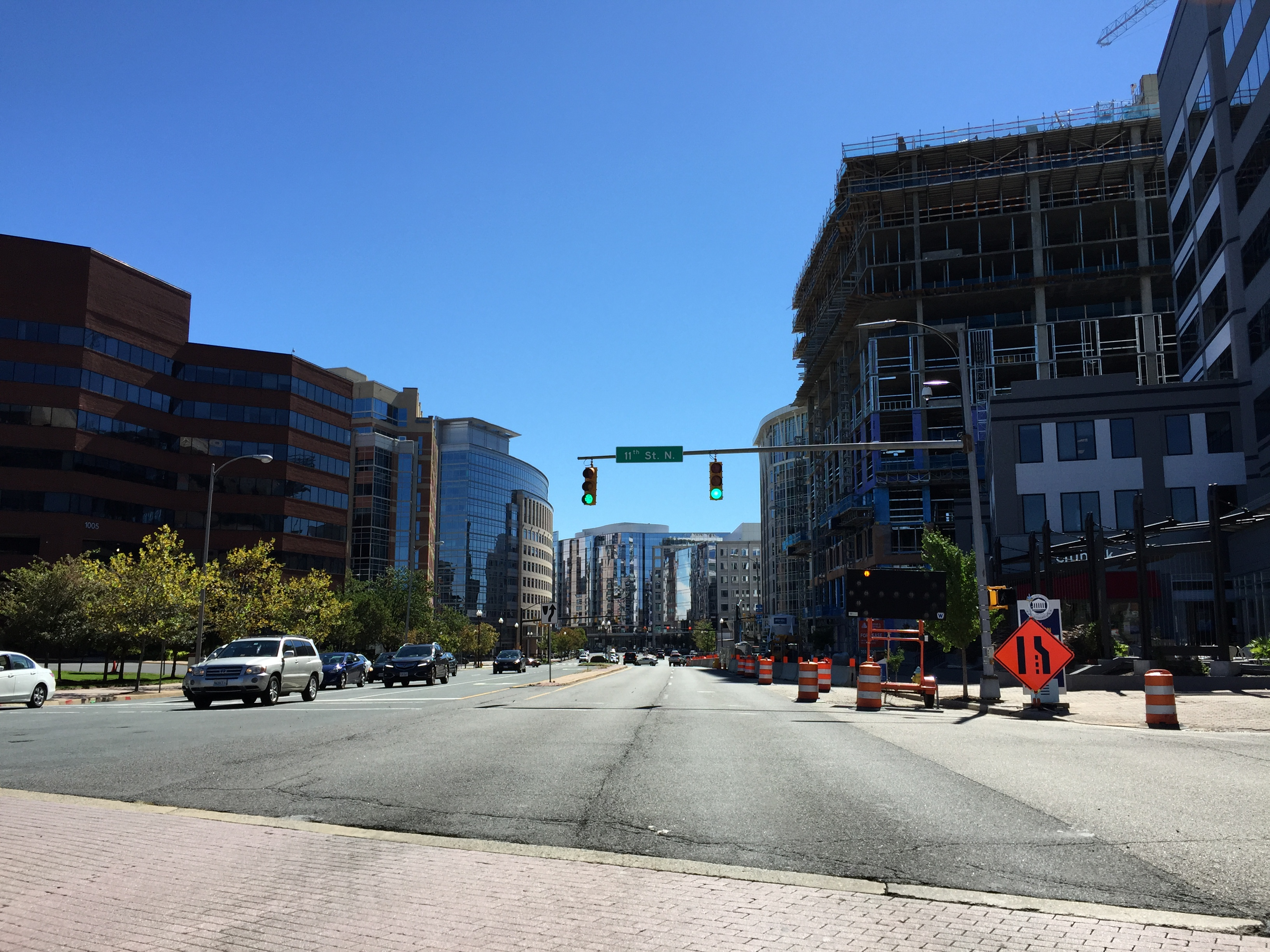
Ballston facing south in October 2016

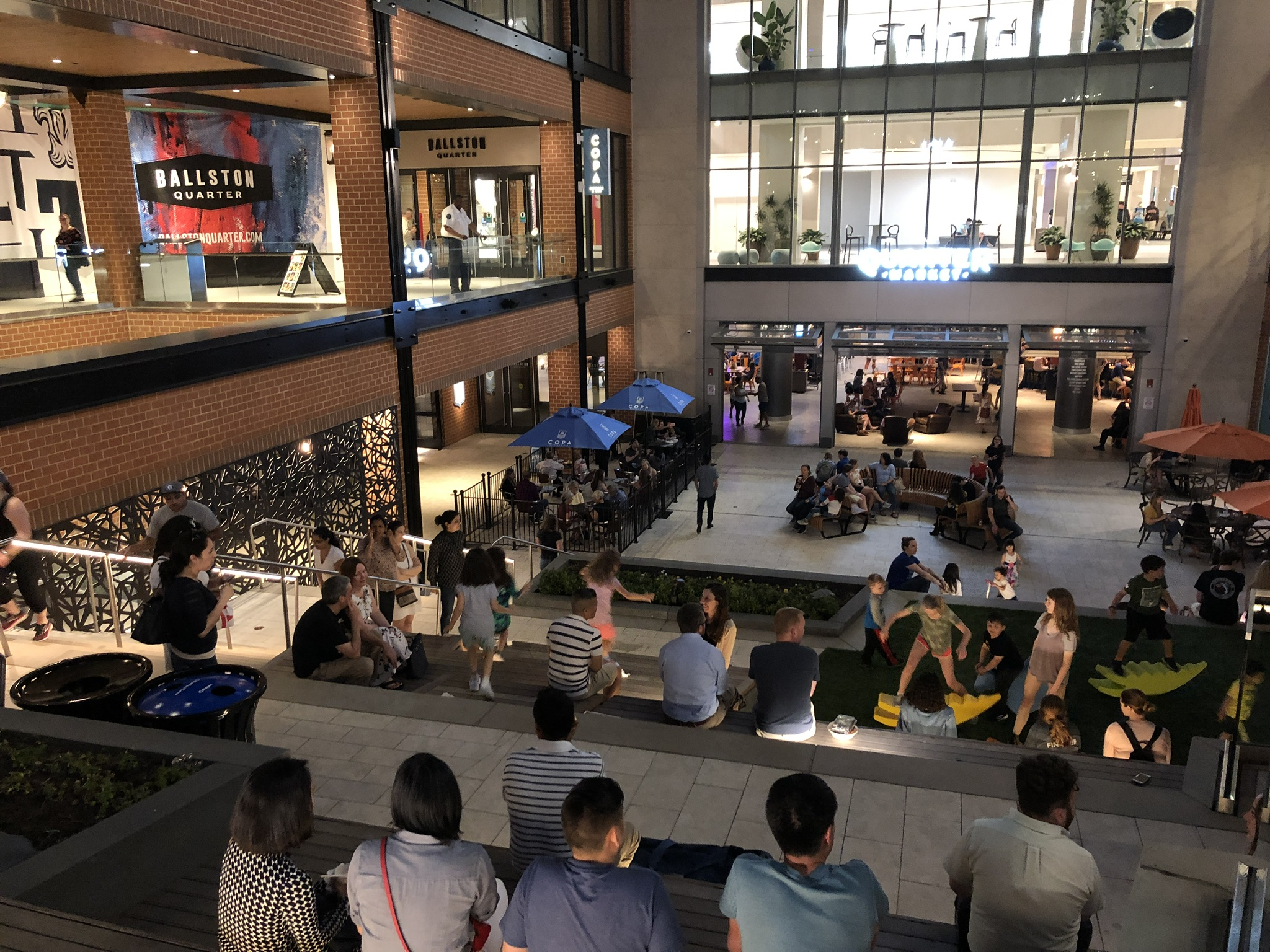
Ballston Quarter in May 2019

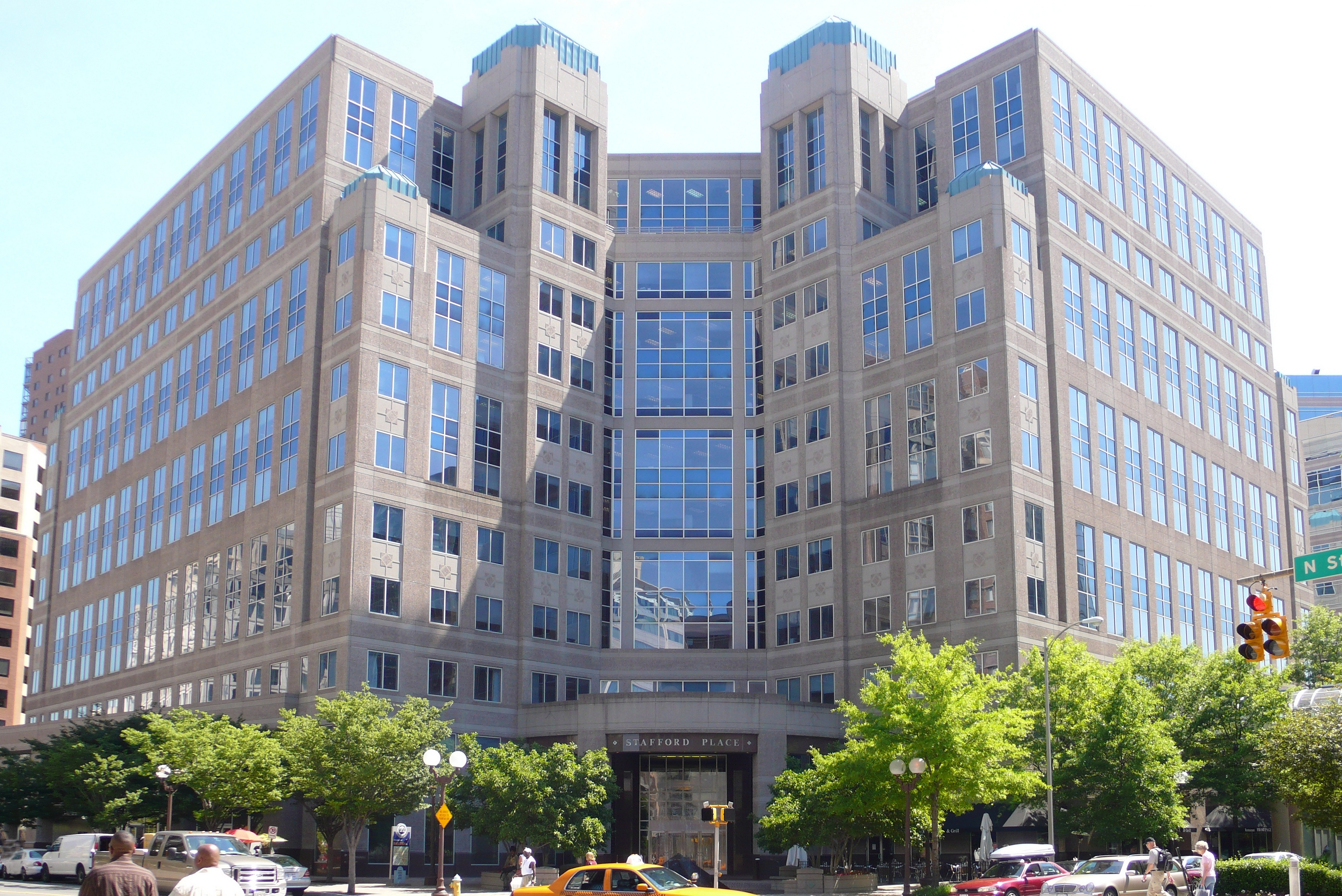
The former headquarters of the National Science Foundation in March 2009

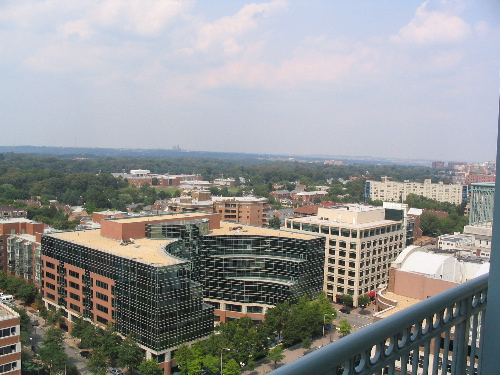
View of Ballston from above Fairfax Drive in June 2004

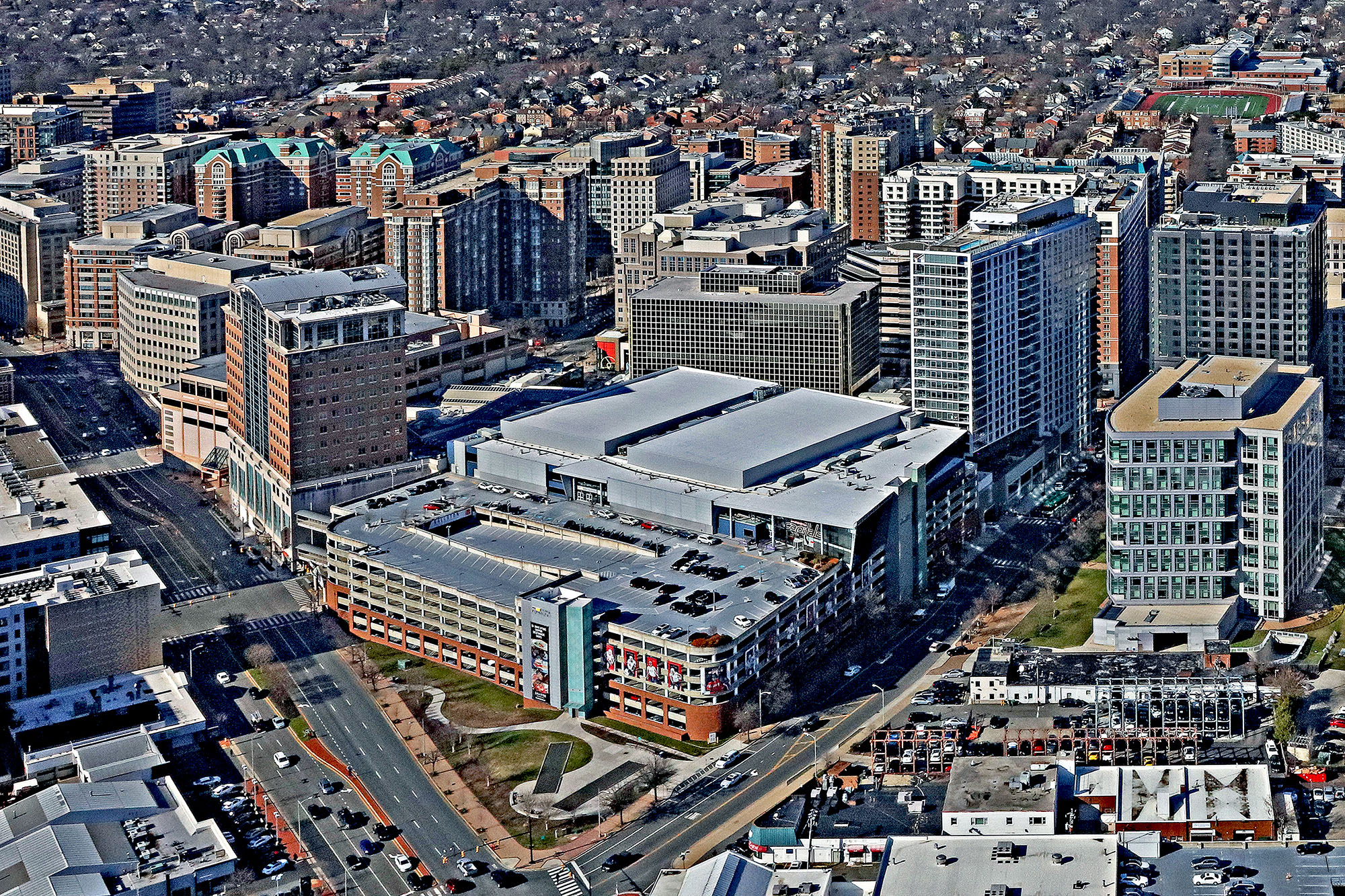
MedStar Capitals Iceplex, the training facility and corporate offices for the Washington Capitals, in Ballston in February 2020

Ballston Quarter, a shopping, entertainment and residential complex, reopened in 2019 after being closed for two years of renovations.

The MedStar Capitals Iceplex, constructed on top of the Ballston Quarter parking garage, houses the offices, 20,000 square feet (1,900 m^{2}) training facility, for the Washington Capitals of the National Hockey League (NHL). In addition to the ice hockey team's training center, the Iceplex features two indoor NHL-sized ice rinks, office space, locker rooms, a full-service pro-shop, a Capitals team store, a snack bar, and space for special events. The facility provides public skating, figure skating, and hockey programs for youths and adults. Virginia Square Shopping Center once operated in the now named Virginia Square section of the Ballston neighborhood.

The regional business development organization, the Ballston Business Improvement District (Ballston BID), (formerly the Ballston-Virginia Square Partnership which is inclusive of the Virginia Square district of Ballston), other area community development organizations, and the National Science Foundation organize the festival. Ticket sales at the event raise funds for area charities.

== Economy ==
The neighborhood has a concentrations of scientific research institutes, research and development agencies, think tanks, lobbying-advocacy groups, trade associations, government agencies, and aerospace manufacturing and defense industry companies, as well as engineering, management, and public sector consulting firms.

Major employers in Ballston include:

- Accenture (HQ)
- Applied Research Associates (ARA)
- Booz Allen Hamilton
- CACI International
- Cybersecurity and Infrastructure Security Agency (DHS National Protection and Programs Directorate)
- Deloitte
- E-Trade
- Evolent Health
- Federal Deposit Insurance Corporation (FDIC)
- Defense Advanced Research Projects Agency (DARPA)
- The Nature Conservancy
- The Office of Naval Research
- Navy-Marine Corps Relief Society
- National Rural Electric Cooperative Association (NRECA)
- National Highway Institute
- Software Engineering Institute
- WeWork
- Industrious
- Mastercard
- Privia Health
- Prudential
- Vivmark Residential
- Willis Towers Watson

In 2011, Accenture agreed to move its offices from Reston, Virginia to a new 360,000 square feet (33,000 m^{2}) facility in Ballston.

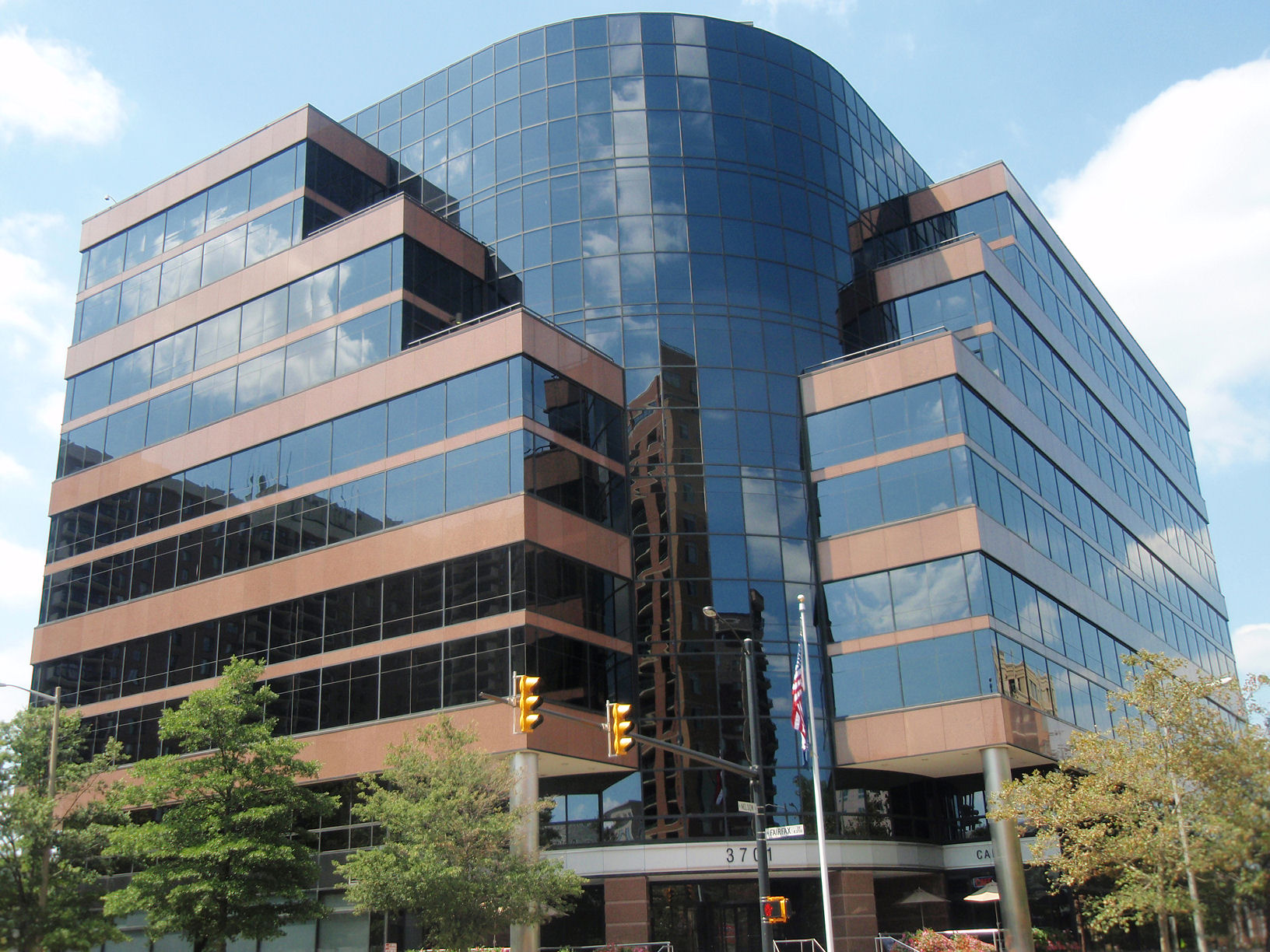
Former DARPA headquarters in the Virginia Square section.

== Education ==
The neighborhood is home to Washington-Liberty High School. Ballston is also home to several university facilities, including:

- A Marymount University (MU) satellite campus.

In January 2014, the Arlington County Board approved MU's site plan application to redevelop the campus with two new buildings, a nine-story office and educational building for Marymount University and a 15-story multifamily building with 272 residential units, by Arlington developer, the Shooshan Company. The new campus opened in August 2017.

- A Virginia Tech research center.
- A George Washington University graduate education center.
- A George Mason University satellite campus and graduate center in the Virginia Square section of Ballston primarily used by the university's Antonin Scalia Law School, Schar School of Policy and Government, George Mason School of Business, and Jimmy and Rosalynn Carter School for Peace and Conflict Resolution.
