= East Falls Church station =

Washington Metro station in Virginia, US

East Falls Church
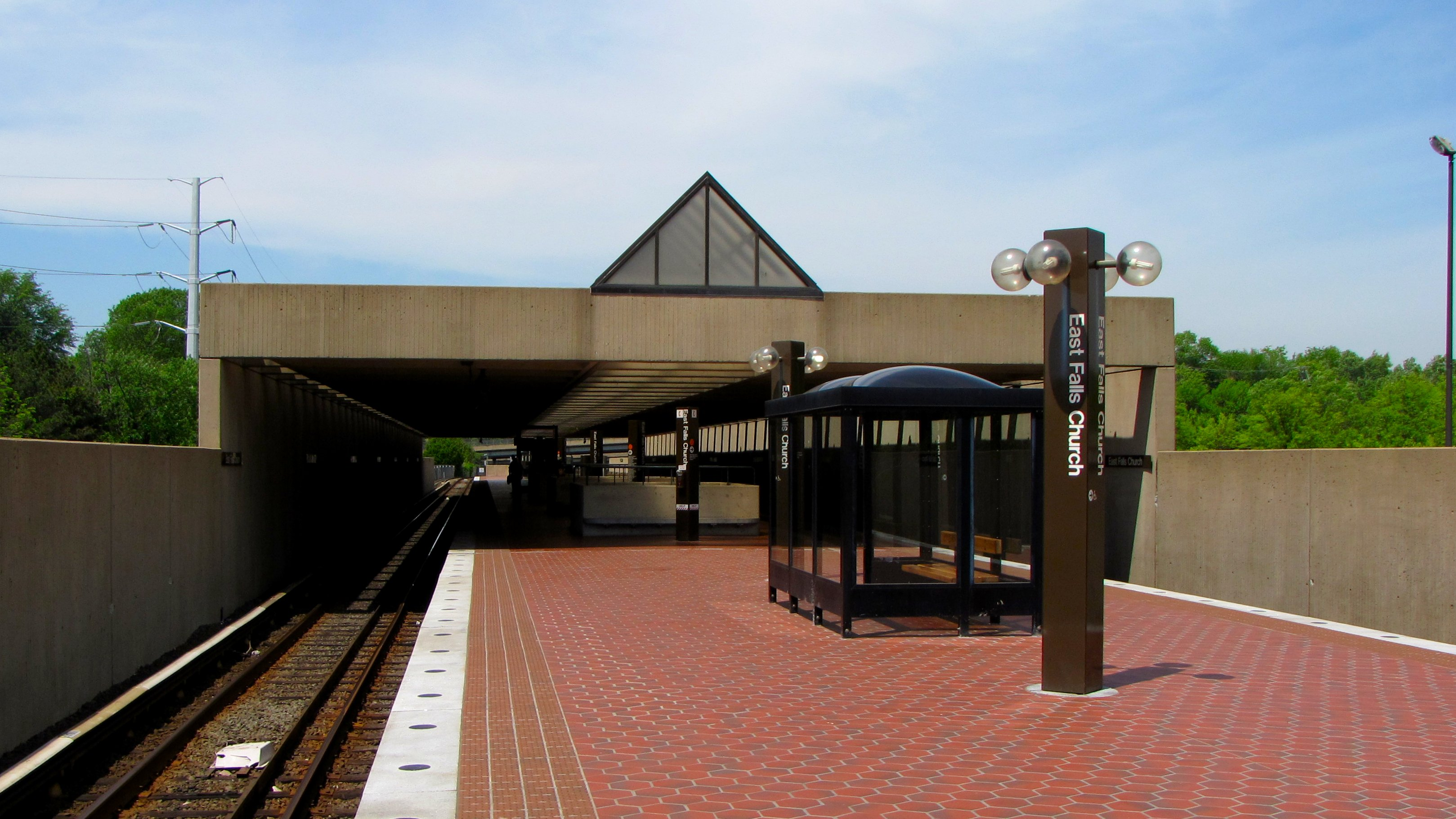
- East Falls Church station's platform facing west in May 2010

General information
- Location: Arlington County, Virginia, U.S.
- Coordinates: 38.8859763°N 77.1568243°W
- Owner: Washington Metropolitan Area Transit Authority
- Platforms: 1 island platform
- Tracks: 2
- Bus stands: 4
- Connections: Metrobus: F20, F26, F50; Arlington Transit: 52, 55; Fairfax Connector: 715, 803; Washington & Old Dominion Trail

Construction
- Structure type: At-grade
- Parking: 422 spaces
- Cycle facilities: Capital Bikeshare, 12 racks, 6 lockers, secure storage room
- Accessible: Yes

Other information
- Station code: K05

History
- Opened: June 7, 1986; 40 years ago
- Rebuilt: 2020

Passengers
- 2025: 3,102 (average weekday)
- Rank: 59 of 98

Services
Preceding station	Washington Metro	Following station
West Falls Church toward Vienna	Orange Line	Ballston–MU toward New Carrollton
McLean toward Ashburn	Silver Line	Ballston–MU toward Downtown Largo or New Carrollton
Route map
Location

East Falls Church station is an island platformed Washington Metro station in Arlington County, Virginia, United States, on the Orange and Silver Lines. East Falls Church station is the last aboveground, at-grade, or open-cut station for eastbound Orange Line and New Carrollton-bound Silver Line trains until Minnesota Avenue, and for eastbound Largo-bound Silver Line trains until Addison Road. East of this station, the trains enter tunnels.

The station serves the communities of Falls Church, Seven Corners, and Arlington. It is located in the median of Interstate 66 near Langston Boulevard (U.S. Route 29, formerly Lee Highway). Service began on June 7, 1986. A parking lot with 422 spaces sits on the north (Langston Boulevard) side of the station.

== Transit-oriented development ==
East Falls Church has the least transit-oriented development of the six stations on the Orange Line in Arlington County. Unlike the stations from Rosslyn to Ballston, East Falls Church station is in the median of Interstate 66, where it is difficult to access for pedestrians. As of 2018, Arlington County was considering plans to develop the site.

== History ==
The station was built as part of the final westward extension of the Orange Line to Vienna., a 9.1-mile (14.6 km) stretch west of the Ballston–MU station. It opened on June 7, 1986, along with the West Falls Church, Dunn Loring, and Vienna stations.

When the Silver Line began service on July 26, 2014, East Falls Church became the final transfer point before its split with the Orange Line.

In May 2018, Metro announced an extensive renovation of platforms at 20 stations. The East Falls Church station platform was to have been be rebuilt starting in early 2021. However, due to low ridership caused by the COVID-19 pandemic, platform reconstruction began one year early, along with other maintenance and repair projects on all stations to the west. This station was one of 19 WMATA stations closed due to the pandemic. The station was further closed due to the platform reconstruction and Silver Line phase two tie-in projects that closed stations west of Ballston–MU station. Shuttle buses began serving the station on June 28, 2020. Trains began bypassing the station on August 16, 2020, when work was nearly done. The station was reopened on August 23, 2020.

From June 3 to 26, 2023, the station was closed for track replacement, along with other stations west of Ballston–MU station.

== Station layout ==
Similar to all stations within the Interstate 66 median apart from West Falls Church, East Falls Church has a simple island platform setup with two tracks. An exit in the central part of the platform leads to a mezzanine on the western side of North Sycamore Street. The station's parking lot and bus bays are to the north of this exit at the southwestern corner of the intersection of North Sycamore Street and North Washington Boulevard. Bike parking is available directly south of the station's entrance, alongside bike lockers near the entrance.
