= Ballston Quarter =

Coordinates: 38°52′45.6″N 77°6′39.6″W

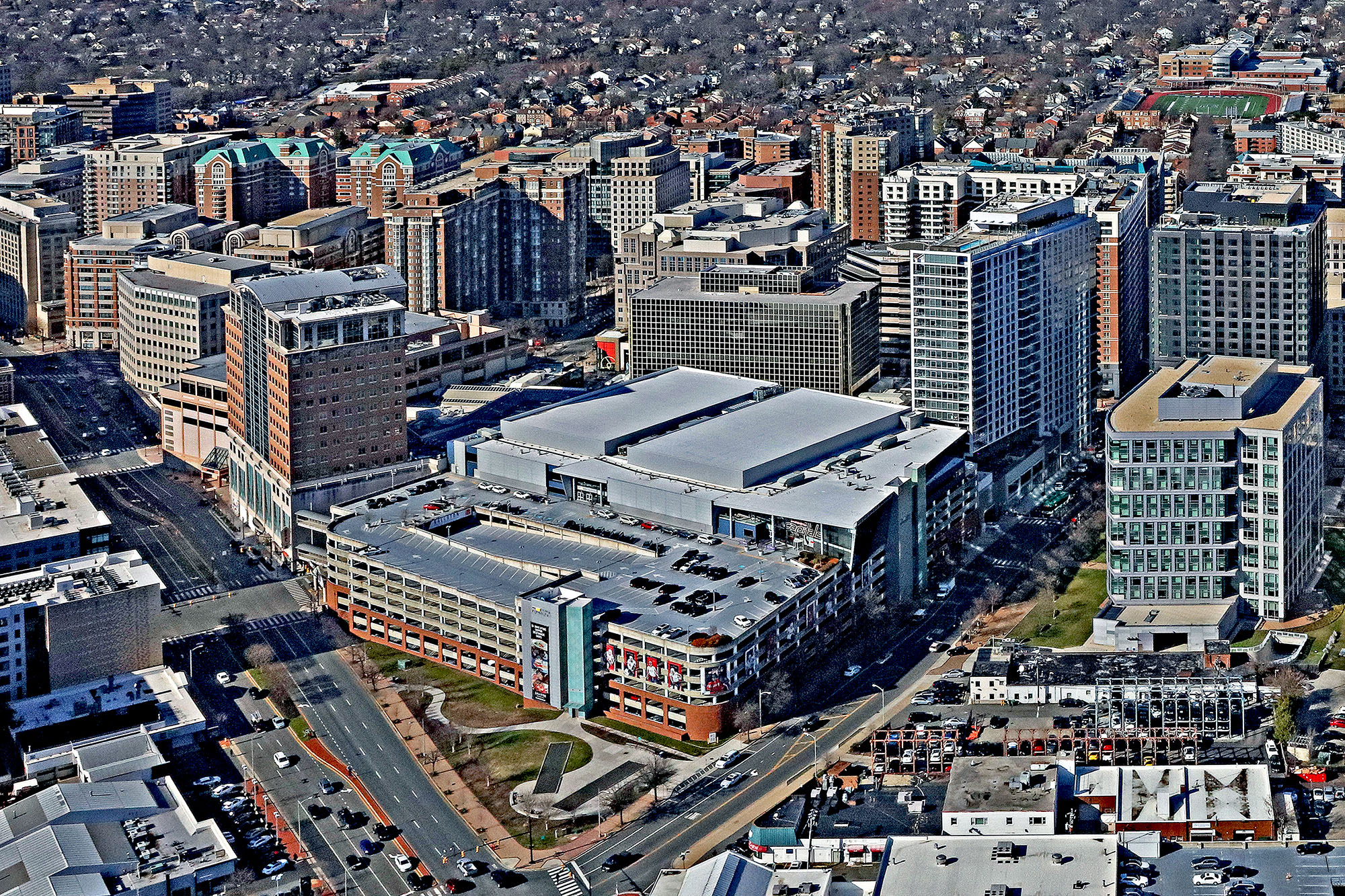
- Ballston Quarter aerial view, 2020
- Opened: 1951 (as Parkington Shopping Center); 1986 (as Ballston Common); 2019 (as Ballston Quarter)
- Closed: 2016 (as Ballston Common)
- Manager: Brookfield Properties
- Num. of anchor tenants: 1 (closed)
- Floor area: 580,000 square feet (54,000 m^{2})
- Floors: 4
- Parking: 3,000 spaces
- Public transit: at Ballston–MU (Washington Metro)
- Website: ballstonquarter.com

Ballston Quarter is one of the first major suburban shopping centers built in the Washington metropolitan area. It opened in 1951 as Parkington Shopping Center and was the nation's first shopping center built around a multi-story parking garage. It is located at the intersection of Glebe Road and Wilson Boulevard in the Ballston neighborhood of Arlington County, Virginia, two blocks from Ballston–MU station on the Washington Metro's Orange and Silver lines. It was remodeled as Ballston Common Mall in 1986 and again in 2019 as Ballston Quarter.

== History ==
=== Site ===
The site of the mall was known as Ball's Crossroads, when Ball's Tavern was located at the site in the early 1800s. Located at the intersection of Wilson Boulevard and Glebe Road, it became the site of Ballston Stadium in the 1930s, a football stadium used by multiple teams, including the Washington Redskins, who practiced there in 1938.

=== Parkington ===
After World War II, with the growth of the suburbs, the stadium was demolished for the construction of Parkington Shopping Center, a $6.5 million development constructed by The Hecht Co. and named for the complex's cutting-edge four-story parking garage. The center was anchored by a Hecht's department store that opened on November 2, 1951. A man was electrocuted during the construction of the store. At its opening, the five story, 300,000-square-foot (28,000 m^{2}) store was the largest suburban department store on the East Coast. The store's façade included a massive three-story glass wall containing eighty-seven 10 × 14-foot panels that were used to post community messages, becoming a local landmark. The mall was considered so futuristic that the United States Information Agency and the BBC jointly produced a half-hour documentary about it, titled "Report From America: Parkington Shopping Center."

Over the years, the $15 million Parkington Shopping Center expanded to 30 stores including Giant Food, McCrory Stores, W. T. Grant, Brentano's Books, Casual Corner, and others. The mall was an enormous success, and had gross sales of over $223 million in 1959. In 1963, a 12-story office building was added. In May 1974, JCPenney opened a 36,327-square-foot (3,374.9 m^{2}) soft line merchandise and catalog store.

=== Ballston Common ===
By 1982, the 30-year-old Parkington Shopping Center was in need of a facelift. Beginning that year, Arlington County embarked on a $100 million renovation project and expansion of the single-story outdoor shopping center to an enclosed, multi-story mall totaling 530,000 square feet (49,000 m^{2}), in limited partnership with May Centers, a subsidiary of The May Department Stores Company, which had acquired Hecht's, the original developer. The mall's new name, "Ballston Common", came from a contest among Arlington residents. After some complications, the renovated and expanded Ballston Common opened on October 20, 1986. The expansion added a 120,000-square-foot (11,000 m^{2}) JCPenney anchor store and brought the mall from 1 to 4 stories of retail, with a 9-story office tower above.

In the early 2000s, the mall became home to the MedStar Capitals Iceplex, the headquarters and practice facility for the National Hockey League's Washington Capitals, and the ComedySportz improvisational theatre organization. The JCPenney anchor store closed in early 2000 and was soon after remodeled as Hecht's Furniture Gallery. In late 2000, Ballston Tower, an adjoining 16-story office tower was completed, with a Regal Cinemas multiplex and retail on the lower levels. In 2003, the triangular-surface parking lot in front of Hecht's at the intersection of Glebe Road and Wilson Boulevard was redeveloped, with the construction of 4300 Wilson Boulevard, an 11-story office tower. All Hecht's stores were rebranded as Macy's in 2006.

=== Ballston Quarter ===
The owner of the mall started planning its redevelopment in 2013. In September 2013, Forest City Washington purchased the Macy's Furniture Store (formerly JCPenney) anchor store building as part of that plan.

In 2016, 49% of the mall was purchased by the Queensland Investment Corporation, a sovereign wealth fund owned by the government of the Australian state of Queensland.

On May 31, 2016, most businesses closed so the mall could be redeveloped. The mall returned partially to its roots, with about half of its roof removed, making it an outdoor mall again. The vacant Macy's Furniture anchor store on the mall's east side was demolished and replaced with a new 22-story, 406-unit apartment tower called Origin Ballston. Ballston Quarter reopened officially in November 2018. Currently, Regal Cinemas and a gym are the major anchors.

Macy's closed in April 2024 as part of a plan to close five stores nationwide, which left the mall without any traditional anchors. The Macy's anchor store was demolished in 2025 for construction of a 500-unit apartment building.

== Reports of shooter ==
On September 14, 2019, the Arlington County Police Department was dispatched to the mall due to reports of a mass shooter. After the mall was searched, it was revealed that there was no shooter. It was suspected to be a prank, but it was later found out that someone misinterpreted the line "Pennywise has sharpshooter activated," while they were watching the movie It Chapter Two at the theatre. The report summoned a massive police presence with police helicopters from Washington, D.C. and neighboring Fairfax County.
