= Donald G. Costello College of Business =

Constituent college of George Mason University

The Donald G. Costello College of Business (formerly the George Mason School of Business) at George Mason University is the business school of George Mason University, a state university in Virginia, United States. The Costello College of Business has campuses located in Fairfax, VA, Arlington, VA, and Incheon, Korea.

The College’s current leadership team includes Dean Ajay Vinze, Associate Deans Cheryl Druehl, Patrick Soleymani, and JK Aier, and Senior Director Tara Hammond. The Costello College of Business is accredited by the Association to Advance Collegiate Schools of Business (AACSB) International.

The Costello College of Business offers undergraduate and graduate programs in the fields of: accounting, finance, marketing, management, information systems, and other business related specialties.

In the 2021 U.S. News & World Report, Mason's Part time MBA was ranked #48, tie with Purdue University. The School of Business was ranked in 2014 in U.S. News & World Report on the following lists: Mason's MBA program was ranked #68 on the "Best Part-time MBA" list, Mason's Online EMBA program was #75 on the "Best Online Graduate Business Program" list, and The Costello College of Business was #72 on the list of "Best Undergraduate Business Programs."

The Costello College of Business also offers study abroad opportunities to students seeking international business experiences. China and France are two of the countries the School of Business works with for their study abroad program.

The Costello College of Business's corporate partners include GDIT, S&P Global, Maximus, EagleBank, Fedwriters, Leidos, and CGI Federal. These partnerships allow the students to have excellent networking opportunities with highly influential names in the world of business. In 2020, UiPath, an automation software company, donated $16.4 million in software for Mason School of Business students.

The School of Management officially changed its name to The School of Business on July 15, 2014. On November 1, 2023, the college was renamed in honor of Virginia businessman Donald G. Costello, in recognition of a $50 million planned gift.
