= Virginia Square Shopping Center =

Shopping mall in Virginia, United States

The Virginia Square Shopping Center was a shopping center in the Ballston section of Arlington County, Virginia. In early 1952, it opened to complement the adjoining Kann's-Virginia store.

At opening, the 15-store center included a Giant supermarket, Peoples Drug, Fanny Farmer candy store, L. Frank Co. women's apparel, Jonas men's apparel, the Bo Peep Shop, Mary Baynes Gift Shop, and an F. W. Woolworth Company variety store.

Following the 1975 closure of the Kann's-Virginia and Kimel's Furniture Store, the center entered into a period of decline.

In March 1986, Mary Baynes Gift Shop closed its doors. Redevelopment of the Center commenced in Summer 1988, when the Federal Deposit Insurance Corporation demolished the old center and erected a new satellite office and other buildings on the site.

The Virginia Square–GMU station on the Washington Metro is named after the shopping center.
