= Virginia Square–GMU station =

Washington Metro station in Virginia, US

Virginia Square–GMU
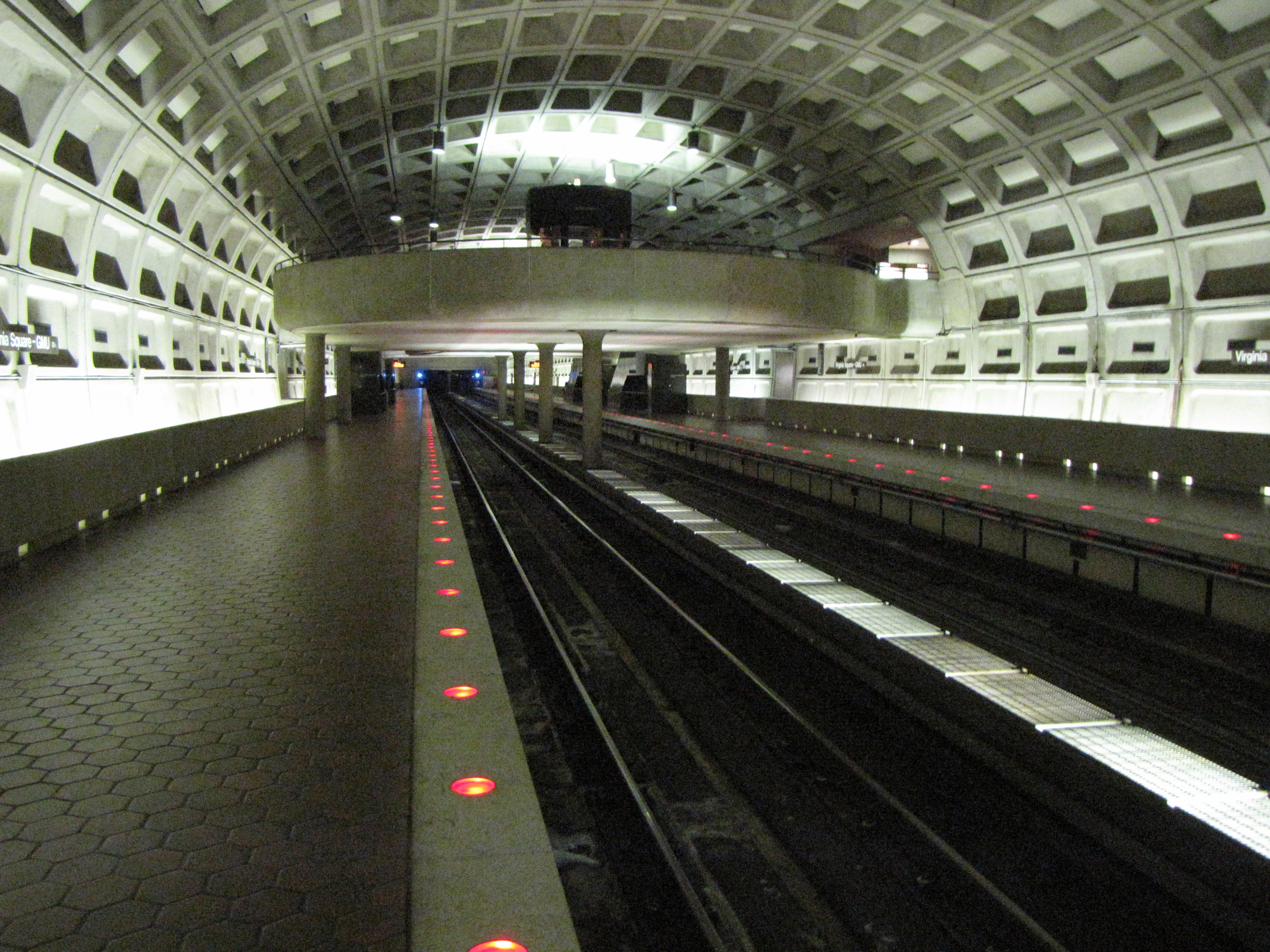
- Virginia Square-GMU station in May 2010

General information
- Location: 3600 Fairfax Drive; Arlington County, Virginia, U.S.
- Coordinates: 38.8829435°N 77.1033092°W
- Owner: Washington Metropolitan Area Transit Authority
- Platforms: 2 side platforms
- Tracks: 2
- Connections: Metrobus: A58, A76; Arlington Transit: 41, 42, 56, 75

Construction
- Structure type: Underground
- Cycle facilities: Capital Bikeshare, 12 racks, 32 lockers
- Accessible: Yes

Other information
- Station code: K03

History
- Opened: December 1, 1979; 46 years ago
- Former names: Ballston (during construction); Virginia Square (1979–1985)

Passengers
- 2025: 2,726 (average weekday)
- Rank: 66 of 98

Services
Preceding station	Washington Metro	Following station
Ballston–MU toward Vienna	Orange Line	Clarendon toward New Carrollton
Ballston–MU toward Ashburn	Silver Line	Clarendon toward Downtown Largo or New Carrollton
Route map
Location

Virginia Square–GMU station is a Washington Metro station in the Virginia Square neighborhood of Arlington County, Virginia, United States. The side platformed station opened on December 1, 1979, and is operated by the Washington Metropolitan Area Transit Authority (WMATA). The station serves the Orange and Silver Lines. The station serves the Virginia Square neighborhood as well as the Arlington campus of George Mason University (GMU). The station entrance is located at the intersection of Fairfax Drive and North Monroe Street.

== History ==
Originally to be called Ballston, the station was renamed Virginia Square by the Metro board in March 1977. Its name was changed due to its location at the since-demolished Virginia Square Shopping Center. (The name "Ballston" was instead used for the next station to the west.) After several years of construction, Virginia Square station opened on December 1, 1979. Its opening coincided with the completion of approximately 3 miles (4.8 km) of rail west of the Rosslyn station and the opening of the Court House, Clarendon and Ballston–MU stations. In July 1985, the Metro board voted unanimously to rename the station Virginia Square–GMU to denote the adjacent Arlington campus of George Mason University. Arlington County paid the $50,000 required for the change.

The station was closed from March 26, 2020, until June 28, 2020, due to the 2020 coronavirus pandemic.
