= Ballston–MU station =

Washington Metro station in Virginia, US

Ballston–MU
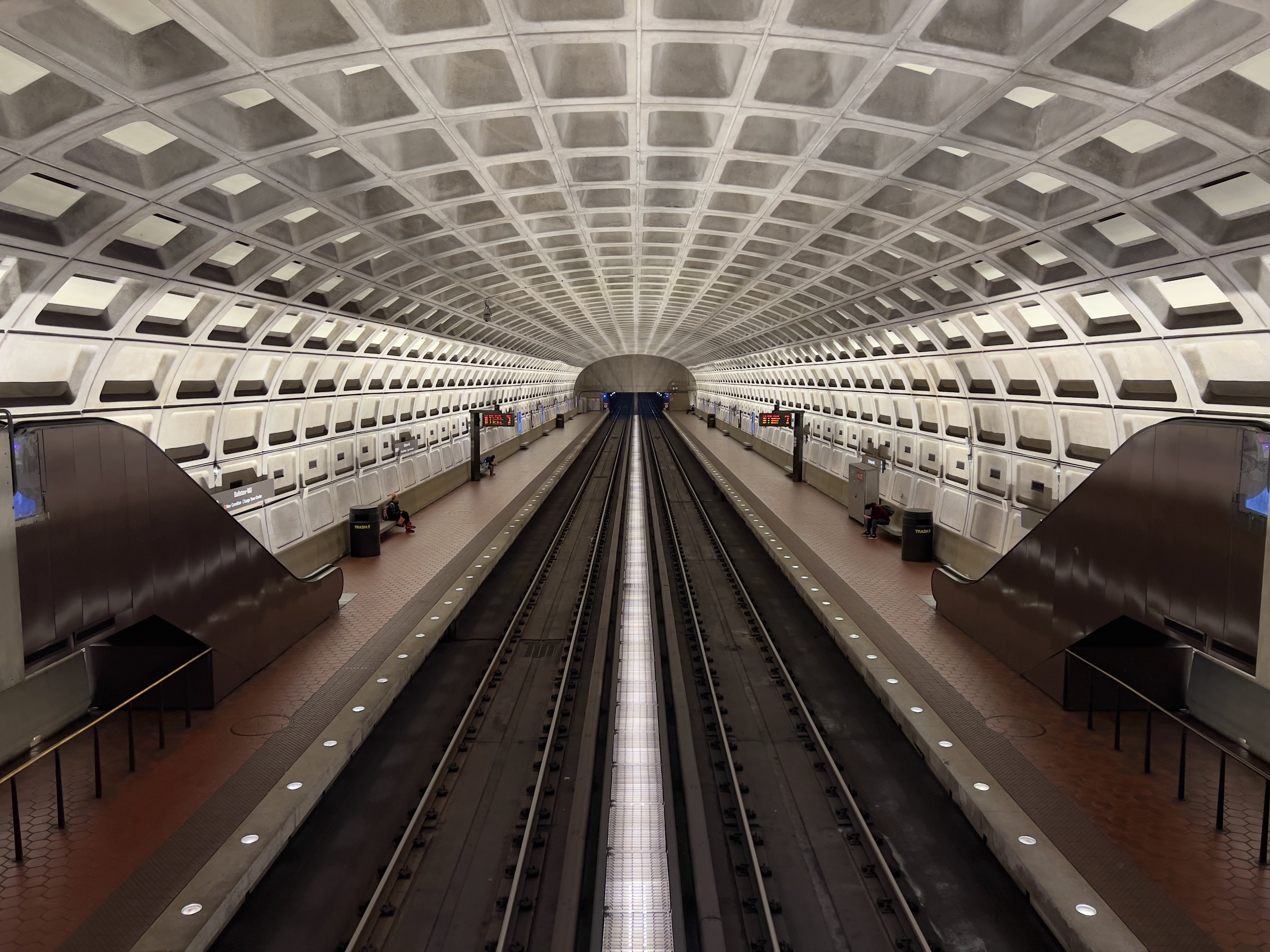
- Ballston–MU station in January 2023

General information
- Location: 4230 Fairfax Drive; Arlington County, Virginia, U.S.
- Coordinates: 38.8820057°N 77.1115141°W
- Owner: Washington Metropolitan Area Transit Authority
- Platforms: 2 side platforms
- Tracks: 2
- Connections: Metrobus: A12, A58, A70, A71, A76, F50, F60, F61; Arlington Transit: 41, 42, 51, 52, 72, 75

Construction
- Structure type: Underground
- Cycle facilities: Capital Bikeshare, 54 racks
- Accessible: yes

Other information
- Station code: K04

History
- Opened: December 1, 1979; 46 years ago
- Former names: Glebe Road (during construction); Ballston (1979–1997)

Passengers
- 2025: 6,908 (average weekday)
- Rank: 19 of 98

Services
Preceding station	Washington Metro	Following station
East Falls Church toward Vienna	Orange Line	Virginia Square–GMU toward New Carrollton
East Falls Church toward Ashburn	Silver Line	Virginia Square–GMU toward Downtown Largo or New Carrollton
Route map
Location

Ballston–MU station is a side-platformed Washington Metro station in the Ballston section of Arlington County, Virginia, United States. The station opened on December 1, 1979, and is operated by the Washington Metropolitan Area Transit Authority (WMATA). The station is part of the Orange and Silver Lines and serves the transit-oriented community of Ballston, Ballston Quarter, and Marymount University (MU).

Ballston–MU is also a central Metrobus transfer station. The station entrance is at North Fairfax Drive and North Stuart Street, near Wilson Boulevard and North Glebe Road. West of this station, the tracks rise above the ground inside the median of Interstate 66.

== History ==
Originally to be called Glebe Road, the station was renamed Ballston by the Metro board in March 1977. After several years of construction, the station opened on December 1, 1979, as the western terminus of the Orange Line. Its opening coincided with the completion of approximately 3 miles (4.8 km) of rail west of the Rosslyn station and the opening of the Court House, Clarendon and Virginia Square stations. Ballston served as the western terminus of the Orange Line from its opening through the opening of its extension to the Vienna station on June 7, 1986, its side-platformed layout being unusual for a terminal station. The station remains as the final underground station for westbound travelers since its completion.

Known simply as Ballston since its opening, in December 1995, the Metro board voted unanimously to rename the station Ballston–MU, with the "MU" standing for the adjacent Marymount University. The $85,000 required for the change was paid for by Arlington County.

The station was the western terminus for Orange Line trains for several months in 2020 due to platform reconstructions at stations west of Ballston. On August 16, 2020, all Orange Line trains were extended to West Falls Church station when it reopened, bypassing East Falls Church station.

In the summer of 2023, between June 3 and June 26, due to track work west of Ballston–MU, it served as the western terminus for both the Orange Line and the main segment of the Silver Line (as opposed to the disconnected western segment from McLean to Ashburn).

=== Western entrance ===
Since at least 2005, the Arlington County government has planned for an additional western entrance to Ballston station, to be located on the south side of Fairfax Drive at North Vermont Street. Intended to relieve crowding at the main entrance, it would serve the dense residential and office developments in that part of the neighborhood and serve buses coming from Interstate 66. It would have escalators and elevators leading to a new mezzanine with faregates at the western end of the station platform. Developer JBG Cos. agreed to build the entrance in 2005 as part of a new development at 4420 Fairfax Drive, in exchange for a higher density allowance. There is a knockout panel to accommodate the entrance.

In September 2013, the Arlington County Board approved a funding plan for the county's share of revenue generated by Virginia's new transportation legislation. The plan calls for $500,000 to be allocated to planning for the new western entrance, which at the time was forecast to be completed in 2018. In 2022, the Northern Virginia Transportation Authority approved an $80 million grant to the county for the project. Plans for the entrance were published in October 2024, with construction planned for 2026 to 2029 at a cost of $177 million.
