= Orange Line (Washington Metro) =

Washington Metro rapid transit line

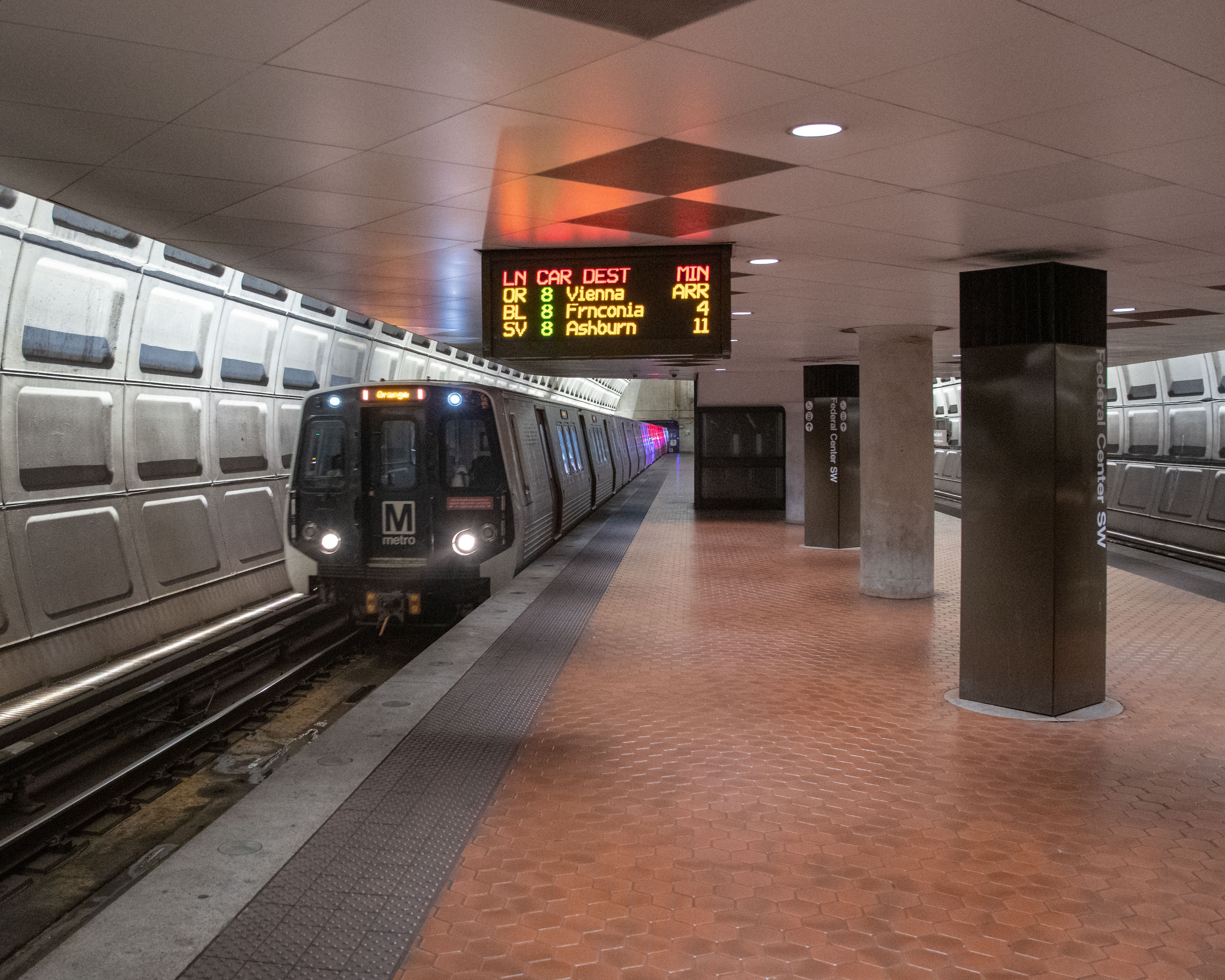
- An Orange Line train at Federal Center SW in September 2023

Overview
- Locale: Fairfax County; Arlington; Washington, D.C. Prince George's County, MD
- Termini: Vienna; New Carrollton
- Stations: 26

Service
- Type: Rapid transit
- System: Washington Metro
- Operator: Washington Metropolitan Area Transit Authority
- Rolling stock: 3000-series, 6000-series, 7000-series

History
- Opened: November 20, 1978

Technical
- Line length: 26.4 mi (42.5 km)
- Number of tracks: 2
- Character: At-grade, elevated, and underground
- Track gauge: 4 ft 8 1/4 in (1,429 mm)
- Electrification: Third rail, 750 V DC
Route map
Orange Line highlighted in orange

Washington Metro system map

The Orange Line is a rapid transit line of the Washington Metro system, consisting of 26 stations in Fairfax County and Arlington in Northern Virginia; Washington, D.C.; and Prince George's County, Maryland, United States. The Orange Line runs from Vienna in Fairfax County to New Carrollton in Prince George's County. Half of the line's stations are shared with the Blue Line and all but three stations (Vienna, Dunn Loring, and West Falls Church) are shared with the Silver Line. Orange Line service began on November 20, 1978.

Trains run every 10 minutes during weekday rush hours, every 12 minutes during weekday off-peak hours and weekends, and every 15 minutes daily after 9:30 pm.

== History ==
=== 20th century ===
In 1955, planning for Metro began with the Mass Transportation Survey, which attempted to forecast both freeway and mass transit systems sufficient to meet the needs of transportation in 1980. In 1959, the study's final report included two rapid transit lines which anticipated subways in downtown Washington. Because the plan called for extensive freeway construction within Washington, D.C., alarmed residents lobbied for federal legislation creating a moratorium on freeway construction through July 1, 1962. The National Capital Transportation Agency's 1962 Transportation in the National Capital Region report anticipated much of the present Orange Line route in Virginia with the route following the median strip of Interstate 66 both inside Arlington and beyond. The route continued in rapid transit plans until the formation of the Washington Metropolitan Area Transit Authority (WMATA).

With the formation of WMATA in October 1966, planning of the system shifted from federal hands to a regional body with representatives of the District, Maryland and Virginia. Congressional route approval was no longer a key consideration. Instead, routes had to serve each local suburban jurisdiction to assure that they would approve bond referendums to finance the system. Because the least expensive way to build into the suburbs was to rely upon existing railroad right-of-ways, the Orange Line took much of its present form, except that it also featured a further extension along the railroad to Bowie, Maryland and along the Dulles Access Road to Dulles International Airport.

By 1966, WMATA and Arlington County planners had agreed "to realign the rapid transit through high-density commercial-office-apartment areas in the vicinity of Wilson Boulevard instead of the freeway's median between the river and Glebe Road." As a result of this agreement, the Orange Line follows in Arlington the former routes of an interurban electric trolley line, the Fairfax line and the North Arlington branch of the Washington, Arlington & Falls Church Railway, that had initially spurred those areas' development.

In March 1968, WMATA approved its Adopted Regional System (ARS) plan that included suburban mass transit lines that followed the median of the proposed Interstate 66 through Virginia to Vienna and the CSX/Amtrak railroad right-of-way in Prince George's County, Maryland. The construction of the downtown Washington sections of the Orange and Blue lines began simultaneously with the Red line. A joint ground-breaking ceremony was held on December 9, 1969. Service on the joint downtown track was at first branded as just the Blue Line and commenced on July 1, 1977.

In 1976, Robert Patricelli, federal Urban Mass Transportation Administrator, ordered Metro to conduct an alternatives analysis of the portion of its system that was not already under contract. Because the Tysons area of Fairfax County developed significantly since the ARS was adopted in 1968, the analysis considered rerouting the Orange line to serve Tysons Corner at an additional cost of $60 million. However, because environmental impact statements had already been completed for the Vienna route, a change in the route would result in a five-year delay in the construction of the Orange Line west of Ballston. This prompted the City of Falls Church to sue WMATA for breach of contract. In the end, WMATA kept the Vienna route intact, leaving Tysons without Metrorail service until 2014.

Service on the Orange Line began on November 20, 1978 between National Airport and New Carrollton, with five new stations being added to the existing network from Stadium–Armory. When the line from Rosslyn to Ballston-MU was completed on December 11, 1979, Orange Line trains began following this route rather than going to the National Airport station. The line was completed on June 7, 1986, when it was extended by four stations to Vienna in the I-66 median.

On January 13, 1982, an Orange Line train derailed as it was being backed up from an improperly closed rail switch between the Federal Triangle and Smithsonian stations, resulting in the deaths of three passengers. It was the first incident within the Metro system that caused a fatality, and the deadliest incident occurring in the system until the 2009 collision that resulted in nine fatalities.

=== 21st century ===
Between 2011 and 2013, service was interrupted at stations west of Ballston–MU on designated weekends to accommodate the construction of the interconnection of the Silver Line with the existing Orange Line tracks. As a part of this project, the train yard adjacent to the West Falls Church station on the Orange Line was expanded.

On June 17, 2012, select Orange Line trains were rerouted to serve Largo Town Center under WMATA's new RushPlus+ during the weekday peak hours, alleviating crowding on the Blue and Orange Lines. These services remained in effect until July 26, 2014, when the Silver Line replaced the Orange RushPlus+. Orange Line stations between East Falls Church and Stadium-Armory began to serve Silver Line trains at the same time.

From March 26, 2020 until June 28, 2020, trains were bypassing East Falls Church, Virginia Square–GMU, Clarendon, Federal Triangle, Smithsonian, Federal Center SW, and Cheverly stations due to the 2020 coronavirus pandemic. All stations reopened on June 28, 2020, except for East Falls Church until August 23 due to the platform reconstruction project west of Ballston-MU.

From May 23 until August 15, 2020, trains terminated at Ballston–MU due to platform reconstruction at East Falls Church, West Falls Church, Dunn Loring, and Vienna. The original plan called for trains to terminate at West Falls Church, but this was instead changed to Ballston due to effects of the ongoing COVID-19 pandemic and low ridership. Shuttle buses were provided to the closed stations. On August 16, 2020, all Orange line trains began terminating at West Falls Church while bypassing East Falls Church. East Falls Church reopened on August 23, 2020. On September 8, 2020, Vienna and Dunn Loring stations reopened.

Between May 28 and September 5, 2022, all Orange Line trains were terminating at Stadium–Armory station on weekdays and Ballston–MU station on weekends due to the Platform Improvement Project which closed stations east of Stadium–Armory. Shuttle buses are provided to all closed stations.

On June 3, 2023, service was suspended west of Ballston–MU for track replacement. East Falls Church and West Falls Church reopened on June 26, 2023. Dunn Loring and Vienna reopened on July 17, 2023. Automatic train operation on the Blue and Orange lines, which had ceased following the 2009 Red Line train collision, was allowed to resume in June 2025. The Silver line started operating within the section between Stadium-Armory and New Carrollton on June 22 2025.

== Route ==
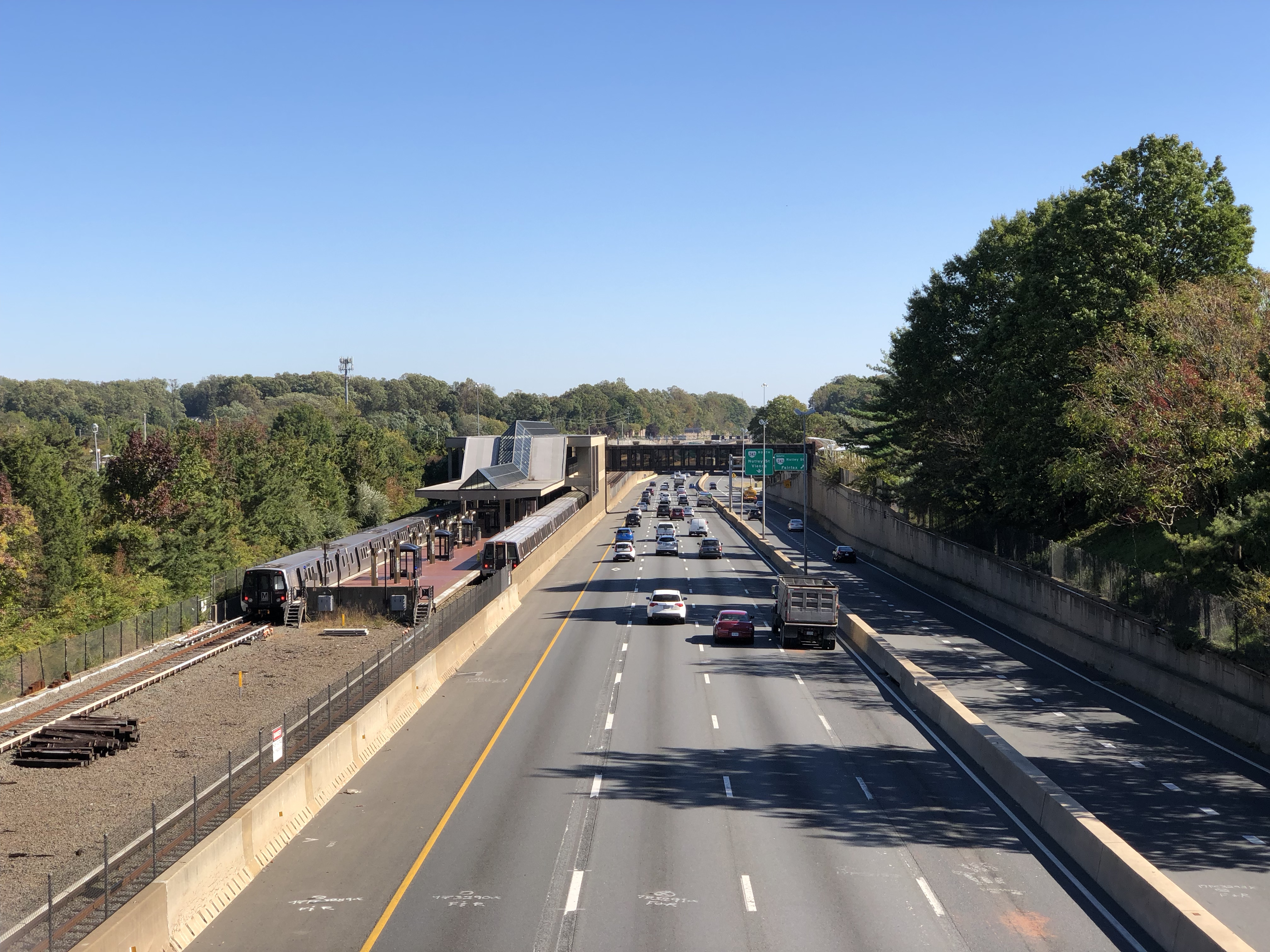
Vienna, the western terminus of the line

Starting at its western terminus at the Vienna/Fairfax-GMU station in Virginia, the tracks run on the median strip of Interstate 66 meeting up with the Silver Line immediately after West Falls Church until they enter a tunnel under Fairfax Drive just before Ballston–MU. The tunnel shifts to Wilson Blvd and 16th Street North. The tunnel then turns north and merges with the Blue Line just before entering Rosslyn which is located under North Lynn Street. The tunnel continues under the Potomac River and bends to the east to travel under I Street NW in the District of Columbia towards Foggy Bottom–GWU. The tunnel continues east under the Potomac River and then I Street. Between Farragut West and McPherson Square stations, there is a non-revenue branch track on the westbound track that connects to the Northwest bound track before Farragut North on the Red Line. The tunnel then turns south under 12th Street Northwest and enters the lower level of the Metro Center station underneath the Red Line. After the Federal Triangle and Smithsonian stations, the tunnel turns east under D Street Southwest and then southeast under Pennsylvania Avenue Southeast before reaching L’Enfant Plaza underneath the Green and Yellow Lines. Continuing east towards the Potomac Avenue station, the tunnel briefly travels under G Street Southeast and then turns northwest under Potomac Avenue with a turn to the north to travel under 19th Street Southeast for the Stadium-Armory station. The tunnel then travels under the RFK Stadium parking lots to surface near Benning Road. The elevated tracks follow Benning Road across the Anacostia River and then would go on to part ways with the Blue and Silver Lines.

After splitting with the Blue and Silver lines (which descend back underground towards Benning Road), the above ground tracks continue for the Orange Line only along DC Route 295 between Minnesota Avenue and Deanwood stations and then follow the CSX/Amtrak/MARC railroad in Prince George’s County in Maryland to serve Cheverly along with Landover before reaching the eastern terminus at New Carrollton.

The route includes storage yards adjacent to West Falls Church and just beyond New Carrollton. Orange Line service travels along the entirety of the K Route (from the terminus at Vienna/Fairfax-GMU to the C & K junction just south of Rosslyn), part of the C Route (from the C & K junction just south of Rosslyn to Metro Center), and the entire D Route (from Metro Center to New Carrollton).

The Orange Line needs 30 trains (9 eight-car trains and 21 six-car trains, consisting of 198 rail cars) to run at peak capacity.

== Stations ==
The following stations are along the line, from west to east:

Station	Code	Opened	Terrain	Rail connections
Vienna	K08	June 7, 1986	surface; median of I-66	
Dunn Loring	K07	June 7, 1986	surface; median of I-66	
West Falls Church-VT (Note: Originally opened as West Falls Church. Changed in 2022)	K06	June 7, 1986	surface; median of I-66	
East Falls Church	K05	June 7, 1986	surface; median of I-66	Silver Line
Ballston–MU	K04	December 11, 1979	underground	Silver Line
Virginia Square–GMU	K03	December 11, 1979	underground	Silver Line
Clarendon	K02	December 11, 1979	underground	Silver Line
Court House	K01	December 11, 1979	underground	Silver Line
Rosslyn	C05	July 1, 1977	underground	Silver Line; Blue Line
Foggy Bottom–GWU	C04	July 1, 1977	underground	Silver Line; Blue Line
Farragut West	C03	July 1, 1977	underground	Silver Line; Blue Line; Red Line (at Farragut North)
McPherson Square	C02	July 1, 1977	underground	Silver Line; Blue Line
Metro Center	C01	July 1, 1977	underground	Red Line; Silver Line; Blue Line
Federal Triangle	D01	July 1, 1977	underground	Silver Line; Blue Line
Smithsonian	D02	July 1, 1977	underground	Silver Line; Blue Line
L'Enfant Plaza	D03	July 1, 1977	underground	Yellow Line; Green Line; Silver Line; Blue Line; Virginia Railway Express (at L'Enfant)
Federal Center SW	D04	July 1, 1977	underground	Silver Line; Blue Line
Capitol South	D05	July 1, 1977	underground	Silver Line; Blue Line
Eastern Market	D06	July 1, 1977	underground	Silver Line; Blue Line
Potomac Avenue	D07	July 1, 1977	underground	Silver Line; Blue Line
Stadium–Armory	D08	July 1, 1977	underground	Silver Line; Blue Line
Minnesota Avenue	D09	November 20, 1978	surface	Silver Line
Deanwood	D10	November 20, 1978	surface	Silver Line
Cheverly	D11	November 20, 1978	surface	Silver Line
Landover	D12	November 20, 1978	surface	Silver Line
New Carrollton	D13	November 20, 1978	surface	Silver Line; Amtrak: Northeast Regional, Palmetto, Vermonter; MARC: ■ Penn Line; MTA Purple Line (under construction)

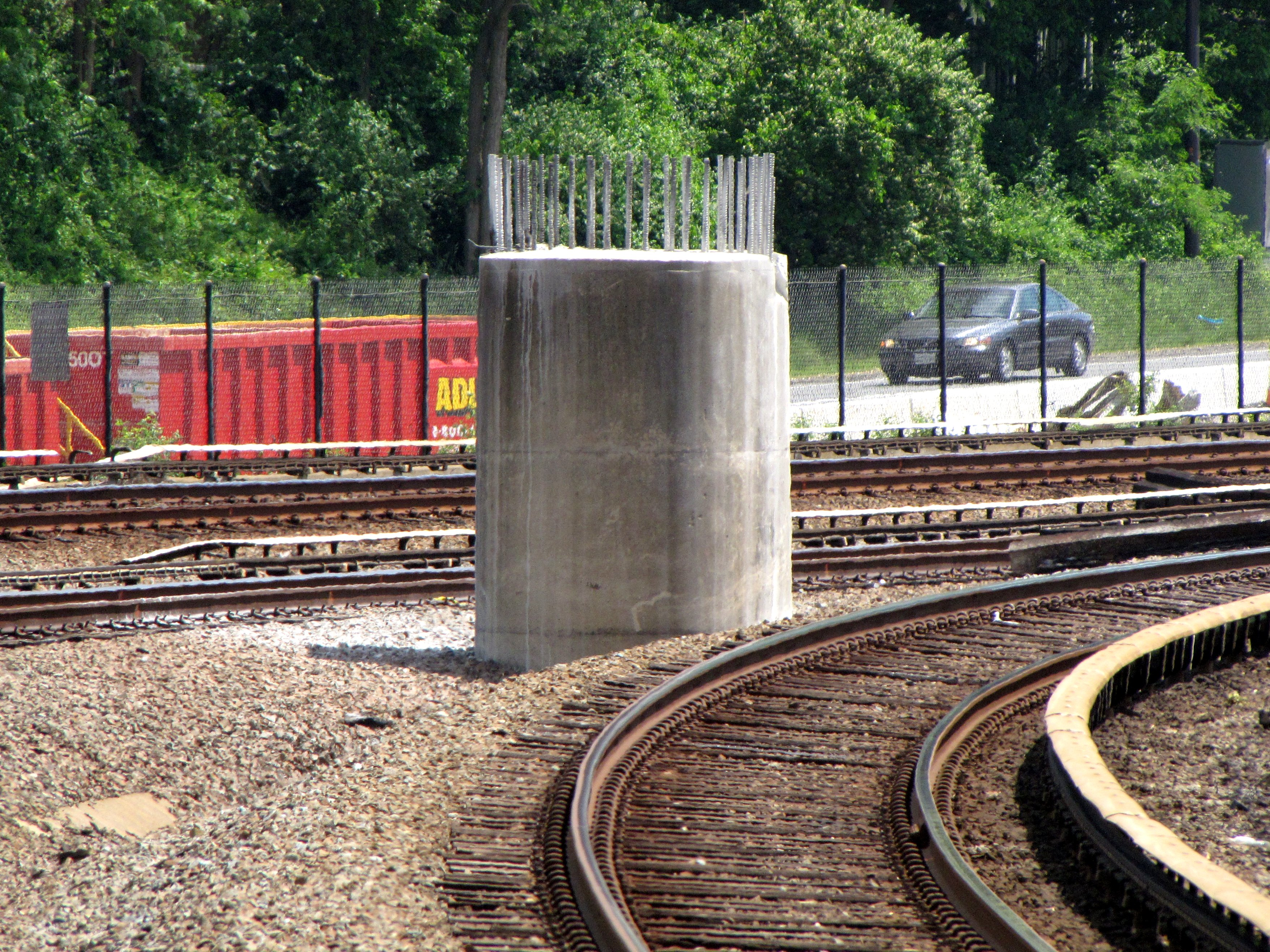
Unused bridge pier east of West Falls Church station, now used for a bridge connecting the Silver Line to the Orange Line.

== Future ==
The Virginia Department of Transportation (VDOT) announced on January 18, 2008 that it and the Virginia Department of Rail and Public Transportation (VDPRT) had begun work on a draft environmental impact statement (EIS) for the I-66 corridor in Fairfax and Prince William counties. According to VDOT the EIS, officially named the I-66 Multimodal Transportation and Environment Study, would focus on improving mobility along I-66 from the Capital Beltway (I-495) interchange in Fairfax County to the interchange with U.S. Route 15 in Prince William County. The EIS also allegedly includes a four station extension of the Orange Line past Vienna. The extension would continue to run in the I-66 median and would have stations at Chain Bridge Road, Fair Oaks, Stringfellow Road and Centreville near Virginia Route 28 and U.S. Route 29. Northern Virginia Transportation Authority’s TransAction 2040 plan includes extending the Orange Line 11 miles past Vienna Station. Plans to extend Orange Line to Bowie have been proposed. In its final report published June 8, 2012, the study and analysis revealed that an "extension would have a minimal impact on Metrorail ridership and volumes on study area roadways inside the Beltway and would therefore not relieve congestion in the study corridor."
