= Northern Virginia trolleys =

Network of electronic passenger rails

Washington-Virginia Railway
- Mount Vernon trolley terminal between 1910 and 1920

Operation
- Began operation: 1892
- Ended operation: 1941

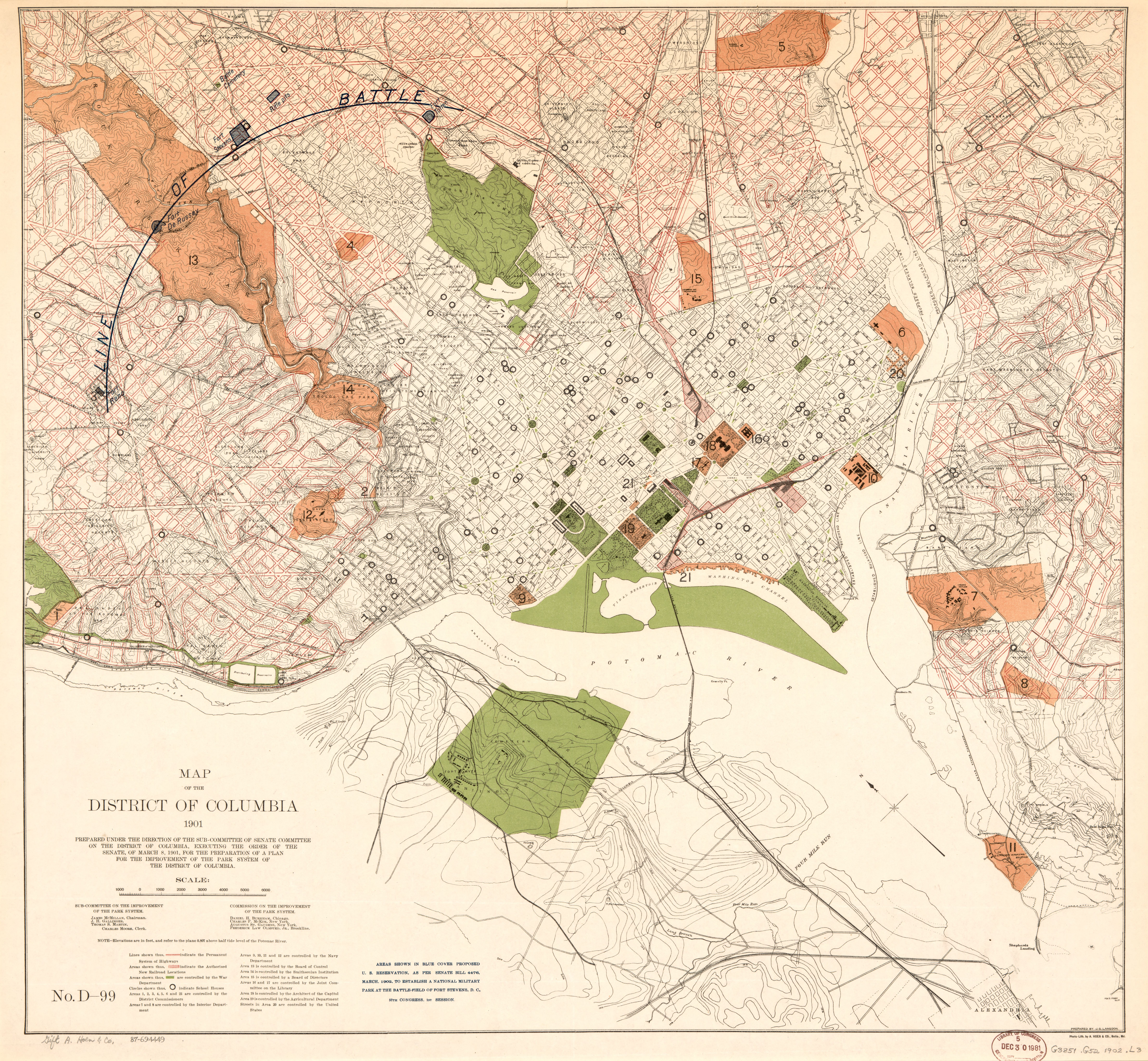
A 1901 map showing early trolley lines in Arlington County, Virginia

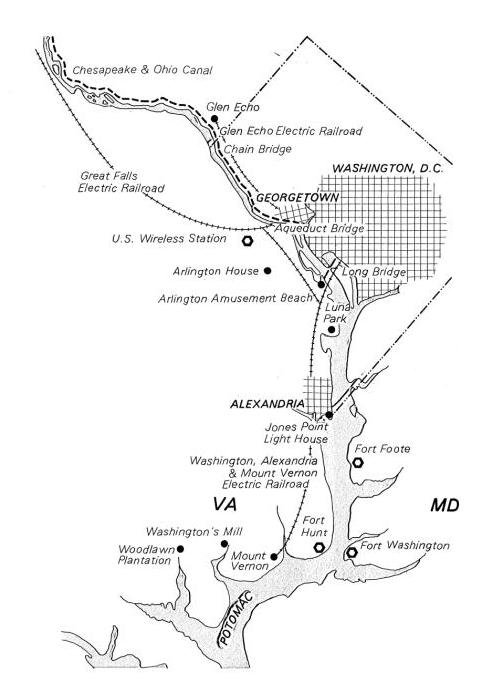
Diagram of 1915 electric railroad routes near the later routes of the George Washington Memorial Parkway, showing: * The Washington-Mount Vernon line of the Washington-Virginia Railway (the "Washington, Alexandria, and Mount Vernon Electric Railroad"); * The Rosslyn branch of the Washington-Virginia Railway (to the east of Arlington House); * The Great Falls Division of the Washington and Old Dominion Railway (the "Great Falls Electric Railroad"); and, * The Washington and Great Falls Electric Railway (the "Glen Echo Electric Railroad")

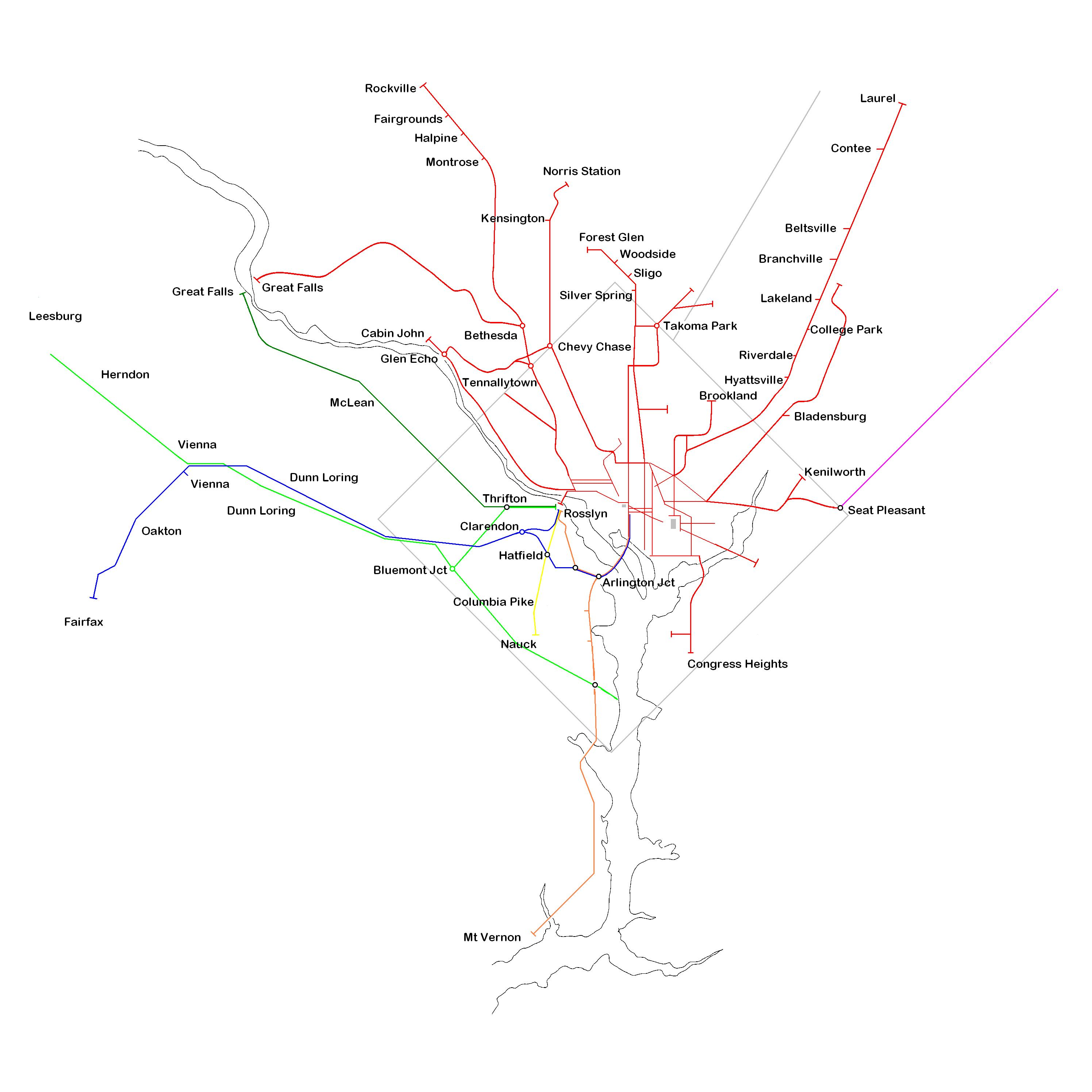
Enlargeable diagram of Washington area trolley lines: Orange = Washington, Arlington & Mount Vernon Electric Railway. Blue = Washington, Arlington & Falls Church Railway (WA&FC). Yellow = Nauck (Fort Myer) line of WA&FC. Light green = W&OD Bluemont Division. Dark green = W&OD Great Falls Division.

The Northern Virginia trolleys were the network of electric streetcars that moved people around the Northern Virginia suburbs of Washington, D.C., from 1892 to 1941. At its peak, the network consisted of six lines that connected Rosslyn, Great Falls, Bluemont, Mount Vernon, Fairfax, Camp Humphries, and Nauck, with two of the lines crossing the Potomac River into Washington, D.C.

Two companies were founded in 1892: the Washington, Arlington and Falls Church Railway Company and the Washington, Arlington and Mount Vernon Railway. A number of communities developed along their routes. In 1910, they merged into the Washington-Virginia Railway. Its major lines converged at Arlington Junction, in the northwest corner of present-day Crystal City south of the Pentagon, and in Rosslyn at the south end of the Aqueduct Bridge, near today's Francis Scott Key Bridge. From Arlington Junction, the W-V's trolleys crossed the Potomac River near the site of the present 14th Street bridges and traveled to a terminal in downtown Washington on a site that is now near the Federal Triangle Metro station. The W-V entered receivership in 1922, was split into two companies in 1927, and stopped operating trolleys by 1939.

A third company and its successors operated electric cars from 1906 to 1912 as the Great Falls and Old Dominion Railroad; then from 1912 to 1941 as the Washington and Old Dominion Railway and the Washington and Old Dominion Railroad. One of the company's branches terminated in Georgetown at a station on the west side of the Georgetown Car Barn after crossing the Potomac from Rosslyn over the Aqueduct Bridge. After 1923, the branch no longer crossed into D.C.; instead, Washington streetcars crossed the river on the new Francis Scott Key Bridge to a turnaround loop in Rosslyn.

After early success, the trolleys struggled. They were unable to set their own prices and found it difficult to compete with automobiles and buses as roads were paved and improved. Much of the system was shut down in 1932 after the trolleys lost their direct connection to Washington, D.C., and the last trolley ran in 1941.

Most of what remains of the network was affiliated with the Washington and Old Dominion Railway, whose right-of-ways have mostly become trails and parks, parts of I-66, and Old Dominion Drive.

== Alexandria Passenger Railway ==
Before the electric trolleys, there was the horsecar line of the Alexandria Passenger Railway (APR), which served Alexandria, Virginia, for just over a year in the 1870s. Starting on July 12, 1873, the APR ran two horse-drawn cars on tracks from the Ferry Wharf, west on King Street and then south on Peyton Street to the old stone bridge over Hooff's Run. The company failed and the railway shut down on September 4, 1874. Several other enterprises to run passenger rail in Alexandria were launched and abandoned over the next couple of decades.

== Washington-Virginia Railway ==
For 15 years, the Washington-Virginia Railway (W-V Railway) controlled two of the three electric railways in Northern Virginia, along with its own Alexandria and Suburban Motor Vehicle Company (A&S). The W-V was chartered in 1910 to operate an electric line from Bluemont to Vienna, which it never did. Instead, in that same year it took control of the Washington, Alexandria, and Mount Vernon Electric Railway and the Washington, Arlington and Falls Church Railways.

A 1912 merger with the Washington Utilities Company was reversed the following year by federal regulators, and the latter company shut down.

=== Rosslyn, Mount Vernon and Camp Humphreys lines ===
==== Washington-Mount Vernon line ====
===== History =====
Washington, Alexandria, and Mount Vernon Electric Railway

In 1890, the Alexandria and Fairfax Passenger Railway was chartered to provide a faster way to reach Mount Vernon than the steamboats that had been used since Mount Vernon opened to the public three decades earlier. In 1892, it changed its name to the Washington, Alexandria, and Mount Vernon Electric Railway and began operating between Alexandria and Mount Vernon. Desiring to become an interurban railroad, it updated its charter and extended the line to Rosslyn in 1896. Along that extension it reached a point called Arlington Junction on the towpath of the abandoned Alexandria Canal near the present-day corner of S. Eads and S. 12th Streets in Arlington where it also built tracks to the 1872 Long Bridge allowing access to Washington, D.C. Once across the Long Bridge, it first used the Belt Line Street Railway Company's old horsecar tracks to reach a station on 14th Street NW in downtown. A year later, it tore those tracks out and replaced them with ones that allowed for underground power. Service to DC began in May 1896 and a few months later to Rosslyn. When the Rosslyn extension opened in July 1896, it was the longest electric streetcar line in the world.

In 1902, the railroad moved its station, as the Belt Line's tracks were circling the block containing the site of a planned new District Building (now the John A. Wilson Building). The new station at 1204 Pennsylvania Avenue NW extended along Pennsylvania Avenue NW, and D Street, NW, from 12th Street, NW, to 13 1/2 Street, NW, near the site of the present Federal Triangle Metro station and on the opposite side of 12th Street from the Old Post Office building. In May of that year, the tracks between Arlington Junction and Four Mile Run were doubled to allow for storing rush hour cars during the day.

In 1903 they built a loop around the block bounded by King, Fairfax, Prince and Royal in Alexandria to allow trains in either direction to turn around.

In 1905, to accommodate the construction of a new City Hall on the site of the Capital Traction Company's former power house, which had burned to the ground in 1897, the railway terminal was moved from 13 1/2 Street and E to 12th and D, NW. That same year, the double tracking of the line was extended south to Alexandria and included the bridge over Four Mile Run.

In 1906, the 1872 Long Bridge's streetcar tracks and road were moved to the Highway Bridge, a new truss bridge immediately west of the older bridge. This span was removed in 1967.

By 1906, the railway had transported 1,743,734 passengers along its routes with 92 daily runs. The route became known as the "Road of the Presidents." Passengers and others could read a 122-page Hand-book for the Tourist Over the Washington, Alexandria and Mount Vernon Electric Railway that described in detail the railway's routes and stations as well as the landmarks, history and geography of the area through which the railway traveled.

In 1907 they finished work on a new terminal at Mt. Vernon. Located near the present entrance, it was a large building with a large restaurant that offered al fresco dining on the balcony. That same year, the Union Passenger Depot opened on the west end of Alexandria with the Mt. Vernon passing beneath it at viaduct and small spur was built to the west, which was removed in 1910.

Washington-Virginia Railway

In 1910, the Washington, Alexandria, and Mount Vernon Electric Railway merged with the Washington, Arlington & Falls Church Railway, which was under the control of the Washington-Virginia Railway.

The rise of the automobile, bad decisions, and economic hard times would lead to the demise of the railway.

In early 1918, a year after the U.S. entered World War I, the Army created Camp Humphreys to train engineers. At the time the only way to reach it was by boat so in July the railway, via a separate corporation named the Mount Vernon and Camp Humphries Railway (chartered with this misspelling), agreed to build a 5-mile extension to the camp. Money was forwarded to them by the War Department and the U.S. Railroad Administration and they purchased 49 new cars with it. While they originally planned to finish the work in 60 days, they were only able to build about 4 miles, and only electrify a few hundred feet, before they ran out of financing. Meanwhile, a standard gauge railroad connection from the Richmond, Fredericksburg & Potomac Railroad opened in July and the Richmond-Washington Highway was paved in October, reducing the need for the electric rail. When the war ended on Nov 11, 1918, the incentive to invest in the line largely disappeared and, as a result, the line sat disused for years. At the end of 1920, the US Government cut a deal to finish the line and operate service on it, paying rent to the streetcar with an option to buy it. By that time the company was already reorganizing. During the spring of 1921, troops at the engineering school finished the line. The corps of engineers bought a single yellow, Brill-Mack rail gasoline rail car and trailer and ran the line for about a year, before stopping service because it was too costly. The project left the railway with a million dollars of debt. The debt, competition from automobiles resulting from the paving of the highway and the construction of new roads, led the company into receivership in 1923. The next year it ended all freight operations, as that had lost money for years. It continued to operate in receivership until 1927.

In early 1925, Robert L. May received a charter to operate a bus line between Washington and Alexandria. Prior to that the W-V railway had formed the Alexandria and Suburban Motor Vehicle Company (A&S) to run buses between Alexandria, Potomac Yard and the Virginia Theological Seminary. At the time, many correctly predicted that it would lead to the end of the Washington-Virginia railway, though the A&S was given permission to go to Washington 10 months later.

Mount Vernon, Alexandria and Washington Railway

In 1927, the two railways were separated and sold at auction, the Washington-Mount Vernon line (AKA the Mount Vernon Division) becoming the Mount Vernon, Alexandria and Washington Railway. At the same time the A&S was sold to the Alexandria, Barcroft and Washington (AB&W) Transit Company.

The next year, Congress passed legislation to build the George Washington Memorial Parkway and they later began negotiations to purchase the line between Alexandria and Mount Vernon as the parkway would follow the route of the railway in several places and the land at the terminus was needed for the park planned along the road. In early 1930, it was announced that the line south of Alexandria, which had long been losing money, would be abandoned, scrapped and the land sold to the federal government. On February 4 they petitioned the state for authority to abandon the 8 miles of line, following which the federal government paid $150,000 for it. A few days after announcing the abandonment, the owners announced a deal to sell the tracks, trolley wires, incidentals and rolling stock, including a once state-of-they art luxury car used to carry Presidents and other dignitaries to Mount Vernon, for scrap metal. Scrapping of the line began on 1 March 1930.

In May 1930, the railway was sold to Robert L. May and merged with the bus service, with both reducing service and raising prices.

In 1926, the federal government began planning for Federal Triangle. By 1931 it was decided that the DC terminal and a portion of tracks for the Mount Vernon, Alexandria and Washington railway would need to be removed to make way for the project. The company sued to prevent this, but lost their case and an appeal to the Public Utilities Commission to use a different route. In early 1932, after being threatened with having their charter stripped and being promised compensation, they agreed to end service to Washington. The last trolley between Arlington Junction and downtown Washington ran on January 18, 1932, two days after the George Washington Memorial Parkway opened. Its operations were replaced with buses from Arlington Junction to a new bus terminal in DC and the tracks between the Bridge and Arlington Junction removed to widen Route 31. For a brief time it operated as the Mount Vernon, Alexandria and Arlington railway, but it was granted permission to suspend service which it did on April 9 of that year. The tracks and other equipment in Alexandria and Arlington were removed except on the paved streets of Alexandria, and in the fall Alexandria negotiated for the removal of the tracks in the city. However, in 1934, finding the cost out of reach, Robert L. May negotiated the transfer of the right of way to the city in exchange for not having to remove them.

Not much of the line remains. Some streets follow the right-of-way and the path of the trolley turnaround at Mount Vernon remains as a traffic circle at the south end of the Parkway, while the former rail yard in southern Arlington now serves as a Metrobus yard. In 2026 a new park constructed on the former site of Arlington Junction, was opened as "Arlington Junction Park". No infrastructure from the streetcar remains, but the Park includes historical information on it.

===== Route =====
After crossing the Potomac River, the trolleys entered Arlington County (named Alexandria County before 1920) to run southward near and along the present route of Interstate 395 (I-395). They then reached Arlington Junction. At the Junction, the line's route diverged from that of a line that traveled west to Fairfax City and which connected to others that served Arlington National Cemetery, Rosslyn and Nauck. After leaving Arlington Junction, trolleys on the Washington-Mount Vernon line continued south along the present route of S. Eads Street while traveling largely on the grade of a towpath on the west side of the defunct Alexandria Canal. Near Arlington's present southern border at Four Mile Run, the railroad and its affiliates constructed an amusement park (Luna Park) and a rail yard containing a car barn and a power plant.

After crossing Four Mile Run into present-day Alexandria, the trolleys continued to travel south along the present route of Commonwealth Avenue. The Mount Vernon line then passed under a bridge at St. Elmo that carried the Bluemont branch of the Southern Railway and later the branch's successor, the Bluemont Division of the W&OD Railway. The lines' St. Elmo stations, located in Alexandria's present Del Ray neighborhood, gave travelers an opportunity to transfer between the railroads.

The Mount Vernon line's trolleys then continued southward along Commonwealth Avenue until reaching King Street near Alexandria's Union Station. The line's trolleys then turned to travel east on King Street until they reached a station at Royal Street, in the center of Old Town Alexandria next to Market Square. They then turned again, traveled south on S. Royal Street and crossed Hunting Creek to enter Fairfax County on a 3,500-foot-long (1,067 m) bridge containing a concrete and steel center span and trestle.

The railway also operated a city line that ran from the ferry wharf at King and Union to the Baltimore and Potomac Railroad station at Cameron and Fayette, travelling along King, Columbus and Cameron.

After traveling through New Alexandria, where the line had originated, the trolleys continued south through Fairfax County at speeds of up to 30 miles (48 km) per hour while traveling partially along the present routes of the George Washington Memorial Parkway, East Boulevard Drive and Wittington Boulevard. After crossing Little Hunting Creek, they reached a turnaround loop on which they traveled to a terminal constructed near the entrance to the grounds of George Washington's home in Mount Vernon.

At Mount Vernon, when the electric railway began service, the estate's proprietors insisted that only a modest terminal be constructed next to the trolley turnaround. They were afraid that the dignity of the site would be marred by unrestricted commercial development and persuaded financier Jay Gould to purchase and donate thirty-three acres outside the main gate for protection.

===== Stations =====
The stations on the Washington-Mount Vernon Line of the Washington, Alexandria, and Mount Vernon Electric Railway (Alexandria-Mount Vernon Branch of the Washington-Virginia Railway) were (with locations of sites in 2008):

Station	Location	Jurisdiction	Miles from Washington Terminal	Notes	Coordinates	Image
Camp Humphreys	Fort Belvoir	Fairfax County				
Mount Vernon	South side of traffic circle at Mount Vernon Estate	Fairfax County	15.8		38°42′39″N 77°05′12″W	Mount Vernon trolley terminal between 1910 and 1920
Oakwood	George Washington Memorial Parkway	Fairfax County			38°42′56″N 77°05′06″W	
Miller	Near west bank of Little Hunting Creek	Fairfax County			38°43′04″N 77°04′38″W	
Riverside	Wittington Boulevard and Bluedale Street	Fairfax County	14.7		38°43′14″N 77°04′14″W	
Hunter	Wittington Boulevard and Elkin Street	Fairfax County	14.2		38°43′22″N 77°03′54″W	
North Mount Vernon	Fort Hunt Road (Virginia State Route 629), south of Old Stage Road	Fairfax County			38°43′30″N 77°03′34″W	
Grassymead	East of Fort Hunt Road, north of Waynewood Boulevard	Fairfax County	13.1		38°43′39″N 77°03′20″W	
Snowden	West Boulevard Drive and Collingwood Road (Virginia State Route 628)	Fairfax County	13.1	Named for Isaac, William and Stacey Snowden	38°43′56″N 77°02′54″W	
Herbert Springs	East Boulevard Drive and Herbert Springs Road	Fairfax County	12.9		38°44′07″N 77°02′48″W	
Arcturus	East Boulevard Drive and Arcturus Lane	Fairfax County	12.8		38°44′14″N 77°02′48″W	
Wellington	East Boulevard Drive, southwest of Wellington House at River Farm	Fairfax County	12.5		38°44′26″N 77°02′51″W	
Bellmont (Wellington Villa)	George Washington Memorial Parkway and Alexandria Avenue	Fairfax County	12.1		38°44′48″N 77°02′56″W	
Happy Home		Fairfax County				
Warwick	George Washington Memorial Parkway and Morningside Lane	Fairfax County			38°45′07″N 77°03′00″W	
Dyke	George Washington Memorial Parkway	Fairfax County	11.3		38°45′34″N 77°02′56″W	Washington, Alexandria, and Mount Vernon Electric Railway near Dyke Marsh with station in background. 1930
Oaks	George Washington Memorial Parkway	Fairfax County			38°45′49″N 77°03′08″W	
New Alexandria	Potomac Avenue and Belle Haven Road	Fairfax County	9.6		38°46′50″N 77°03′23″W	
Unnamed	Near S. Royal Street and Hunting Creek	City of Alexandria			38°47′32″N 77°02′46″W	
Alexandria	King and Royal Streets	City of Alexandria	7.7		38°48′17″N 77°02′37″W	
Spring Park (later Union Station)	King Street and Commonwealth Avenue	City of Alexandria	6.7		38°48′24″N 77°03′35″W	
Rosemont	Rosemont Avenue and Commonwealth Avenue	City of Alexandria			38°48′36″N 77°03′39″W	
North Rosemont	Walnut Street and Commonwealth Avenue	City of Alexandria			38°48′44″N 77°03′42″W	
Braddock	Braddock Road and Commonwealth Avenue	City of Alexandria	6.0		38°48′59″N 77°03′45″W	
North Braddock	Commonwealth Avenue	City of Alexandria				
Lloyd	Windsor Avenue and Commonwealth Avenue	City of Alexandria	5.7		38°49′27″N 77°03′45″W	
Del Ray	Del Ray Avenue and Commonwealth Avenue	City of Alexandria	5.6		38°49′33″N 77°03′43″W	
Mount Ida	Mount Ida Avenue and Commonwealth Avenue	City of Alexandria		Historical marker near site of station: The Electric Railway	38°49′42″N 77°03′39″W	
St. Asaph	Commonwealth Avenue, between Forrest Street and Ancell Street	City of Alexandria	5.6	Served St. Asaph Racetrack. (1894–1905); Historical marker near site of station: St. Asaph Racetrack	38°49′47″N 77°03′36″W	
Hume	Intersection of Hume Avenue, Mount Vernon Avenue and Commonwealth Avenue	City of Alexandria		Historical marker near site of station: Mount Vernon Avenue	38°49′51″N 77°03′35″W	
St. Elmo	Commonwealth Avenue near Ashby Street	City of Alexandria	4.8	Crossing of W&OD Railway's Bluemont Division; Historical marker near site of station: The Bluemont Line	38°49′59″N 77°03′32″W	
Four Mile Run	Near present intersection of S. Glebe Road and S. Eads Street	Arlington County	4.1	Historical marker near site of station: Transportation	38°50′33″N 77°03′17″W	
Car Barn	In bus yard east of S. Eads Street	Arlington County		Formerly in rail yard	38°50′43″N 77°03′14″W	
Luna Park	West side of S. Eads Street	Arlington County		Adjacent to amusement park in present site of sewage treatment plant	38°50′43″N 77°03′14″W	
Aurora Hills	26th Street S. and S. Eads Street	Arlington County			38°51′02″N 77°03′13″W	
Virginia Highlands	23rd Street S. and S. Eads Street	Arlington County		1910 Photo	38°51′12″N 77°03′12″W	
Addison	18th Street S. and S. Eads Street	Arlington County	3.2		38°51′27″N 77°03′11″W	
Arlington Junction	Between Army-Navy Drive and 12th Street S and between S. Eads Street and Richmond Highway (U.S. Route 1)	Arlington County	2.7	Junction with the Rosslyn Branch of the Washington, Alexandria, and Mount Vernon Railway and later with the South Arlington branch of the Washington—Virginia Railway	38°51′50″N 77°03′12″W	
South Washington	Near I-395	Arlington County			38°52′00″N 77°02′56″W	
Alexander Island	Near I-395 between Boundary Channel Drive and George Washington Memorial Parkway	Arlington County	2.1		38°52′15″N 77°02′40″W	
Washington Terminal	1204 N. Pennsylvania Avenue; West side of 12th Street, NW, between Federal Triangle Metro Station and Pennsylvania Avenue, NW	District of Columbia	0	At corner of 13 & 1/2 Street, NW, and Pennsylvania Avenue, NW, in 1902.	38°53′41″N 77°01′42″W	

===== Remnants of the Washington-Mount Vernon line =====
- Roads
  - Wittington Boulevard, Fairfax County. Coordinates: 38°43′17″N 77°04′07″W
  - East Boulevard Drive, Fairfax County. Coordinates: 38°44′18″N 77°02′49″W
  - Potomac Avenue, Fairfax County. Coordinates: 38°46′26″N 77°03′26″W
  - Commonwealth Avenue, Alexandria. Coordinates: 38°49′28″N 77°03′45″W
  - South Eads Street, Arlington. Coordinates: 38°51′04″N 77°03′13″W
- Metrobus yard
  - Former rail yard at S. Eads Street (east side) and S. Glebe Road (north side), Arlington. Coordinates: 38°50′40″N 77°03′13″W
- Metrobus
  - The A&S bus company, sold to the AB&W in 1927, was purchased by the Metro Bus system in 1973 and rolled into that.
- Traffic circle
  - Former trolley turnaround at Mount Vernon estate, Fairfax County. Coordinates: 38°42′41″N 77°05′10″W
- Tracks – In May 2020, during repair of a water main on King Street, a work crew of the Alexandria Department of Transportation and Environmental Services discovered old tracks buried under the pavement.
- Cars - The last remaining trolley car from all of the Northern Virginia trolleys was the Washington, Alexandria, and Mount Vernon Railway's #51, a snow sweeper purchased in 1905, which was owned by the National Capital Trolley Museum until it was destroyed by a fire in 2003.

==== Rosslyn branch ====
The Washington, Alexandria, and Mount Vernon Electric Railway constructed the Rosslyn branch (aka the East Arlington Branch), which traveled from Arlington Junction to the Virginia end of the Aqueduct Bridge in Rosslyn, primarily as a way to compete for Arlington Cemetery patronage.

===== History =====
The Rosslyn Branch began passenger service on 22 May 1896, just weeks before the Mount Vernon line was connected to it. Following the merger that created the Washington-Virginia system, service to the cemetery was primarily provided by the Falls Church line, so in May 1921 the W-V sought and received permission to discontinue service on the Rosslyn Branch between Rosslyn and Mt. Vernon Junction. The only opposition came from workers at the Government Experimental Farm located on the east side of the track.

The tracks were removed in the 1930s and the right of way was taken for use by the Pentagon, its nearby traffic interchanges and an expansion of Arlington National Cemetery.

===== Route =====
After leaving Arlington Junction, the Rosslyn branch traveled northwest along a route that was south of the future site of The Pentagon, crossed Columbia Pike and entered Mt. Vernon Junction. At that junction, the Rosslyn branch met the South Arlington branch, which the Washington, Arlington & Falls Church Railroad constructed.

After leaving Mt. Vernon Junction, the Rosslyn branch crossed the southern boundary of the federally-owned "Arlington Reservation". The site of the crossing was at that time near the southeast corner of Arlington National Cemetery, which was within the Reservation. After entering the Reservation, the branch turned to travel north along the eastern side of Arlington Ridge Road (formerly named the Alexandria & Georgetown Turnpike), which was outside of the Cemetery near the Cemetery's eastern wall.

While traveling next to Arlington Ridge Road, the branch passed the Cemetery's McClellan and Sheridan Gates. An expansion of the Cemetery later encompassed this portion of the Road, whose route no longer exists within the Cemetery.

Construction of the branch permitted visitors from Washington, D.C., to reach the Cemetery by rail for the first time. However, after leaving the trolleys outside of the Sheridan Gate at the branch's Arlington station, visitors needed to ascend a steep hill to reach most of the Cemetery's well-known features and burial sites.

After passing its Arlington station, the branch crossed the north boundary of the Reservation and turned to travel northwest until it met Rosslyn's Chadwick Avenue (now named N. Lynn Street), on which it traveled north. The branch ended near the Aqueduct Bridge at the railway's Rosslyn terminal.

===== Rosslyn branch stations =====
The stations of the Rosslyn branch were (with locations of sites in 2008):

Station	Location	Jurisdiction	Notes	Coordinates
Rosslyn	N. Lynn Street near Key Bridge Marriott Hotel	Arlington County	East of W&OD Railway station. 1925 photo	38°53′59″N 77°04′15″W
Arlington	Arlington National Cemetery	Arlington County	Outside of the now-demolished Sheridan Gate of Arlington National Cemetery (location now inside the cemetery)	38°53′05″N 77°04′01″W
Queen City	Near present crossing of Columbia Pike and South Joyce Street	Arlington County	Outside of the south boundary of Arlington National Cemetery	38°52′14″N 77°03′56″W
Mount Vernon Junction	Near present east crossing of Columbia Pike (Virginia State Route 244) and Washington Boulevard (Virginia State Route 27)	Arlington County	Junction with South Arlington branch of Washington, Arlington & Falls Church Railway	38°52′11″N 77°03′42″W
Relee	I-395 between S. Fern Street and S. Eads Street, south of The Pentagon	Arlington County	Named for Robert E. Lee	38°51′56″N 77°03′20″W
Arlington Junction	Between Army-Navy Drive and 12th Street S and between S. Eads Street and Richmond Highway (U.S. Route 1)	Arlington County	Junction with Washington-Mount Vernon line	38°51′50″N 77°03′12″W

=== Fairfax and Arlington lines ===
During its forty years of life, this interurban trolley company operated under a variety of names, as it expanded, reorganized, and contracted.

Washington & Arlington — 1892–1896

On February 28, 1891, the United States Congress enacted a statute that incorporated the Washington, Arlington and Falls Church Railway Company in the District of Columbia, with authorization to reach Fort Myer and the northwest entrance of Arlington National Cemetery (the cemetery's Fort Myer Gate) by crossing the Potomac River on a new bridge that the company would build at or near the "Three Sisters" islets. "Arlington" in the name referred to the cemetery and the house; Arlington County did not exist yet. The system started in October 1892 as a horsecar line with tracks from Rosslyn up the hill to the cemetery's Fort Myer Gate; this would later become the Nauck Line. The following spring it opened a 0.75 mile long section of line using underground electric conduit operation of its own design. But another conduit system, introduced a few months later, became the standard in DC and in June 1893 the bank foreclosed on them, shutting down operations for two years. In 1894, the assets were sold at auction. One of the buyers reestablished service to Ft. Myer - along a slightly different route, at first by horses but then, in late 1895, the system was electrified. The company never built its planned Three Sisters Bridge.

Washington, Arlington & Falls Church — 1896–1910

In 1896, the company laid track from Rosslyn through Clarendon and Ballston to Falls Church, constituting the North Arlington Branch and part of the Fairfax Line, and the name was changed to the Washington, Arlington & Falls Church (WA&FC). The track though Fort Myer was extended past the northwest entrance to Arlington National Cemetery to reach Penrose in 1900 and Nauck, just north of Four Mile Run, in 1901. That same year saw the opening of about a mile of additional track, extending from East Falls Church to West Falls Church. Work on a far more ambitious extension began at West Falls Church in 1903, bringing the line through Dunn Loring and Vienna in 1904 to reach the Fairfax County Courthouse in Fairfax City. The railroad finally gained access, indirectly, to Washington, when the Washington and Old Dominion Railroad began running a "bridge car" from Rosslyn to Georgetown in 1906. In 1907, the W.A. & F.C. built the South Arlington branch from Clarendon to a point where it met the Washington, Alexandria and Mt. Vernon Railway's Rosslyn branch, called Mount Vernon Junction, and used systems tracks to reach downtown Washington via the Long Bridge.

In 1907, the railway was involved in a crash with an automobile that killed the motorman and injured several employees and passengers. The subsequent lawsuits forced the railway into receivership. In 1908 it was sold to the Washington, Alexandria & Mount Vernon.

Washington – Virginia — 1910–1927

In late 1910, the WA&FC and Washington, Alexandria & Mount Vernon were merged to form the Washington-Virginia (W-V) Railway, whereupon the WA&FC became the W-V's Falls Church Division. They opened with the intention of extending the Nauck line to Manassass but were forced to drop that by the DC public Utilities commission in 1913 after they took part in an effort to consolidate the streetcar and electric utility companies of DC and Northern Virginia. As noted above, the company fell upon hard times, went into receivership in 1923 and in 1924 declared bankruptcy. In 1927, the W-V's bus company, the A&S, added a bus line that ran from Fairfax directly to downtown Washington via Falls Church and Lee Highway. In 1927, the two rail companies were split and sold at auction and the bus company was spun off and sold to Robert May's Alexandria, Barcroft and Washington Transit Company.

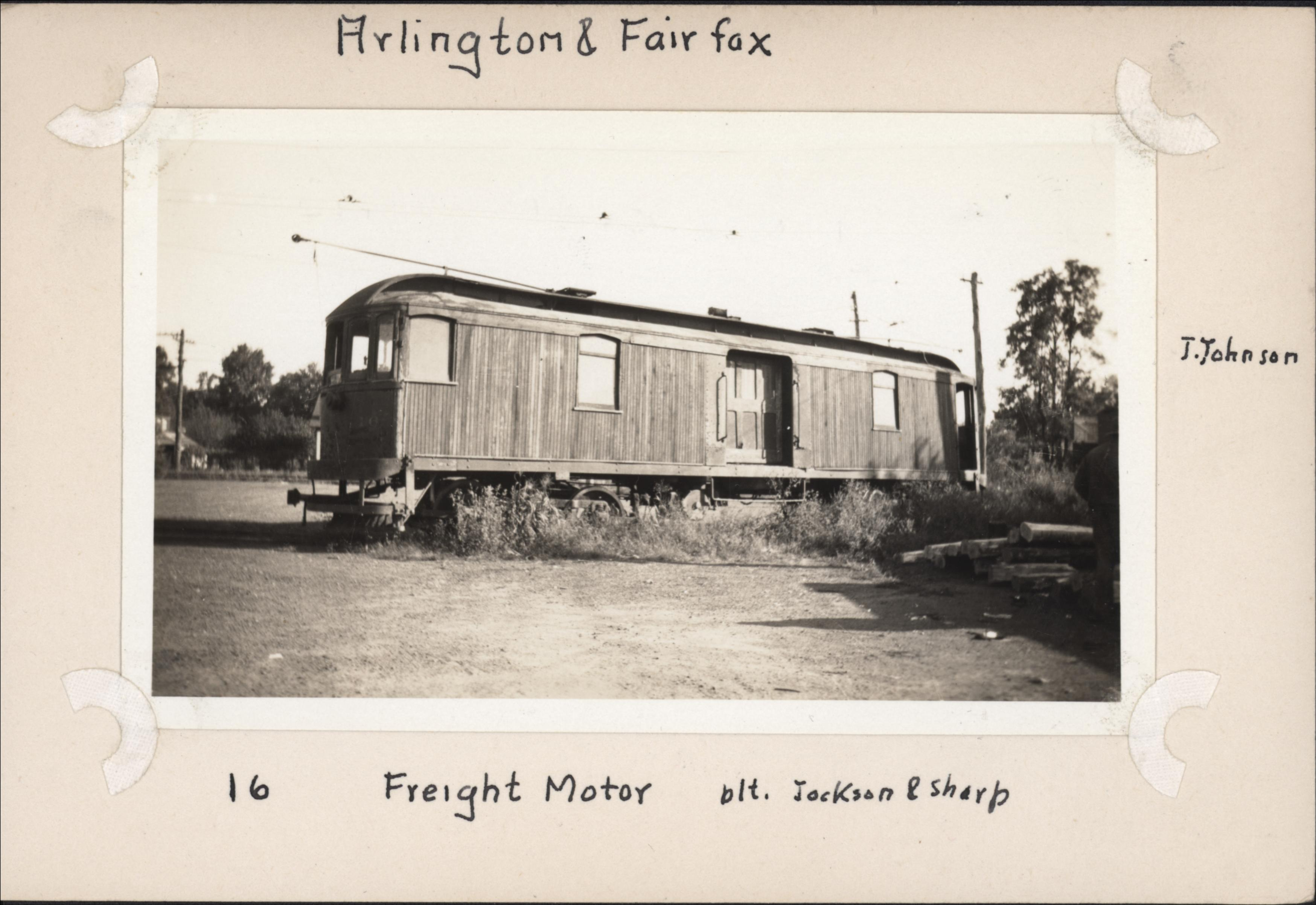
Arlington & Fairfax freight motor trolley

Arlington & Fairfax Railway — 1927–1937

In 1927, the Arlington & Fairfax was organized by local governments and citizens to take control of the 24.27 miles of WA&FC lines after the W-V went bankrupt. At the same time they purchased 30 secondhand cars. In 1932, the W, A and MV line lost the right to travel into D.C. which cut the A&F off as well. On January 17, 1932, the last Arlington & Fairfax streetcar departed from 12th & D Streets, NW, abandoning all direct service to Washington, D.C. In April the company started running buses, as the Arlington and Fairfax Motor Transportation Company subsidiary, from Clarendon straight into Washington and they proved so popular that on August 1 the company abandoned rail service between Clarendon and Arlington Junction. In late 1932, they announced plans to remove the South Arlington Branch (tracks between Clarendon and Arlington Junction) which they did by 1934, and in 1935 they sold that part of the right-of-way that was not part of Ft. Myer. In 1934 they extended motor coach service to the edge of Falls Church and then into the town.

In 1936 - after an experimental run in late 1935 - the company began to transition from electric cars to auto-railers, small buses that can run on rails on flanged wheels or on roads with rubber tires image. The auto-railer's were made by Detroit's Evans Products Company, which, in exchange for a 51% stake in the A&F, spent $30,000 to rehabilitate the infrastructure, and supplied six auto-railers for immediate use. These first replaced cars on the Nauck line in the summer of 1936 and then on the Fairfax line between Vienna and Fairfax in December, making the A&F the first railroad in the United States to use them. At the end of the year, the company defaulted on its debt and was sold at auction in January 1937.

A building at Arlington Junction – about 500 feet southwest of the current intersection of Army-Navy Drive and Eads – that served as a dispatcher's office, substation and passenger waiting room was removed in 1975.

Arlington & Fairfax Auto Railway — 1937–1939

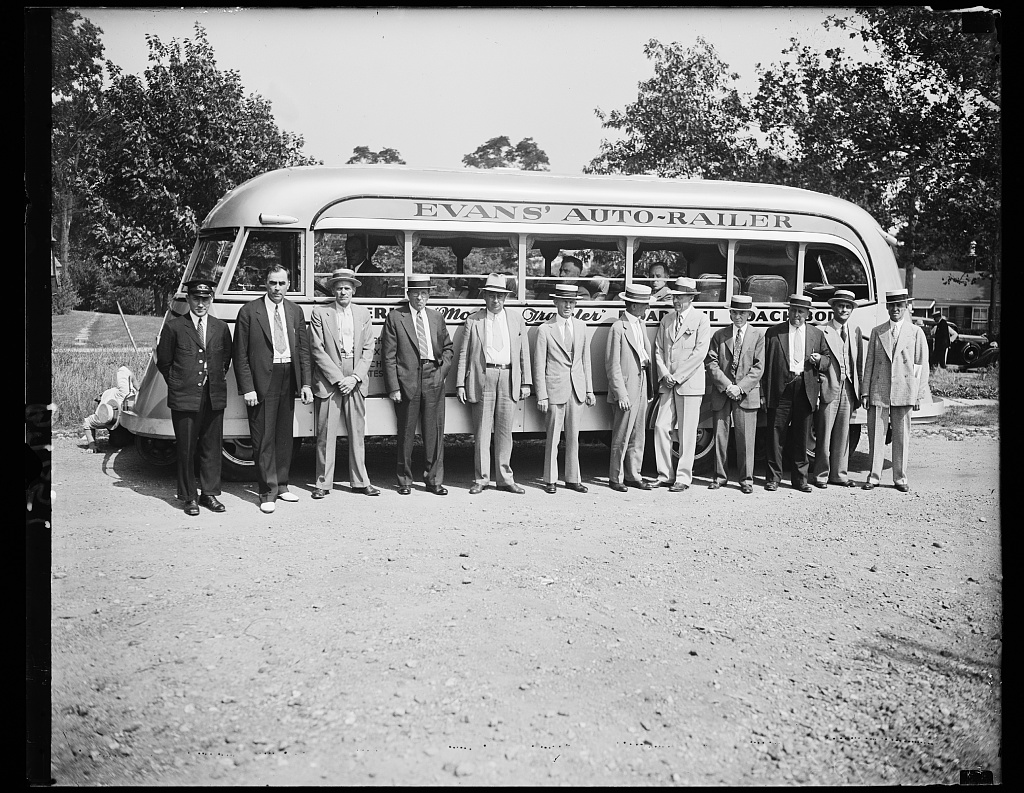
Evans Auto-Railer

In 1937, the company was sold to a committee of three Arlington residents, who changed the name to the Arlington & Fairfax Auto Railway and committed to completing the transition to auto-railers. As part of the same transition, the Evans Auto-Railer Company took on a role in managing the system.

Later that year the transition to auto-railers was complete, with Evans spending $125,000 to replace Arlington's remaining streetcars. The auto-railers went to Rosslyn where riders had to switch to DC transit. The Arlington & Fairfax tried several times to gain permission to continue into downtown DC, but were repeatedly blocked by the established DC transit companies.

In August 1939 the railway, citing an inability to cover operations costs and competition that prevented raising fares, announced that they were in default and that they were seeking permission to cease operations. The last auto-railer ran before midnight on September 9, 1939, and the service was replaced by buses of the Washington, Virginia and Maryland Coach Company.

==== Nauck line (Fort Myer line) ====
Originally constructed by the Washington, Arlington and Falls Church Railroad, the Nauck line (aka the Fort Myer or Green Valley line) of the Washington—Virginia Railway ran south from Rosslyn through Fort Myer to an initially lightly developed area in South Arlington near Four Mile Run. After leaving the railroad's Rosslyn terminal near the Aqueduct Bridge, the line travelled south through Fort Myer Junction along the present routes of N. Lynn Street and N. Meade Street.

The line then turned to the southwest and crossed the northern boundary of the Arlington Reservation and Fort Myer near today's Wright Gate. Within the Fort, trolleys on the line climbed a hill along the present route of McNair Road near the western wall of Arlington National Cemetery to reach a station (Arlington Fort Myer) located within the Fort at the present intersection of McNair Road and Lee Avenue, near the Cemetery's Fort Myer Gate (Chapel Gate of Fort Myer).

After disembarking at the Arlington Fort Myer station, visitors could enter the Cemetery near its highest elevation. This permitted visitors to avoid the ascent required when entering the Cemetery through the Sheridan Gate after traveling on the Rosslyn branch to that branch's Arlington station. After the Rosslyn branch closed in 1921, the Nauck line provided the only rail service that visitors could use to reach the Cemetery.

After leaving the Arlington Fort Myer station, the line traveled south through Fort Myer before turning southwest to cross the South Arlington branch of the railroad's Fairfax line at Hatfield Junction. Passengers could transfer between the two lines at the railroad's adjacent Hatfield station.

Soon after leaving Hatfield Junction and continuing to travel southwest, the Nauck line crossed the west boundary of the Reservation and the Fort, a short distance north of the Fort's Hatfield Gate. The line then crossed the present path of Washington Boulevard (Virginia State Route 27), south of the Boulevard's crossing of Arlington Boulevard (U.S. Route 50)

The Nauck line then traveled southwest and south while partially following the present routes of S. Uhle Street and Walter Reed Drive. After crossing S. Glebe Road (now Virginia State Route 120), the line traveled downhill near the west side of S. Kenmore Street to end at a railway turntable near the intersection of 24th Road S. and S. Kenmore Street. The line terminated a short distance north of the Cowden (Nauck) station of the Southern Railway, and later, of the W&OD Railway's Bluemont Division.

===== Nauck line stations =====
The stations of the Nauck line (Fort Myer-Arlington Branch of the Washington-Virginia Railway) were (with locations of sites in 2008):

Station	Location	Jurisdiction	Notes	Coordinates	Image
Rosslyn	N. Lynn Street near Key Bridge Marriott Hotel	Arlington County	East of W&OD Railway station	38°53′59″N 77°04′15″W	
Fort Myer Junction	East of intersection of Fairfax Drive and N. Lynn Street	Arlington County	Junction with North Arlington branch of the Fairfax line	38°53′36″N 77°04′15″W	
Grinder		Arlington County			
Mount Washington		Arlington County			
Radnor Heights	N. Meade Street and 14th Street N. (southwest side)	Arlington County		38°53′25″N 77°04′17″W	
Signal Corps	N. Meade Street immediately west of the Netherlands Carillon	Arlington County		38°53′16″N 77°04′18″W	
Fort Myer Steps	Marshall Drive and Stewart Road, Fort Myer	Arlington County		38°53′10″N 77°04′31″W	
Arlington Fort Myer (Cemetery)	McNair Road and Lee Avenue, Fort Myer	Arlington County	Near Fort Myer Gate of Arlington National Cemetery (Chapel Gate of Fort Myer)	38°52′50″N 77°04′45″W	Arlington Fort Myer trolley station. Post hospital at left.
Hatfield (Hatfield Junction)	In Fort Myer, southwest of the intersection of Pershing Drive and Sheridan Avenue; east of Washington Boulevard (Virginia State Route 27) and southeast of Arlington Boulevard (U.S. Route 50)	Arlington County	Crossing of South Arlington branch of the Fairfax line	38°52′26″N 77°04′55″W	
Hunter	2312 2nd Street S.	Arlington County		38°52′17″N 77°05′02″W	
Penrose	S. Barton Street, between 2nd Street S. and 5th Street S.	Arlington County		38°52′12″N 77°05′08″W	
Fulcher	Near S. Barton Street and 3rd Street S.	Arlington County		38°52′13″N 77°05′07″W	
Munson (Bailey)	Near S. Cleveland Street and 5th Street S.	Arlington County	Named for Miles C. Munson	38°52′09″N 77°05′11″W	
Bradbury	Near S. Walter Reed Drive and 6th Street S.	Arlington County	Named for Bertha E. Bradbury	38°52′04″N 77°05′16″W	
Arlington Columbia	S. Walter Reed Drive and Columbia Pike	Arlington County		38°51′45″N 77°05′13″W	
Petty	S. Walter Reed Drive and 12th Street S.	Arlington County	Named for Henry S. Petty	38°51′38″N 77°05′13″W	
Fox	S. Walter Reed Dr. and 16th Road S. (near S. Glebe Road (Virginia State Route 120))	Arlington County		38°51′21″N 77°05′19″W	
Fort Berry	19th Street S., west of S. Kenmore Street	Arlington County		38°51′12″N 77°05′18″W	
Corbett (also Nauck)	Between 19th Street S. and 22nd Street S., west of S. Kenmore Street	Arlington County	Named for S.B. Corbett; Historical marker near site of station: Nauck: A Neighborhood History	38°51′05″N 77°05′13″W	
Peyton	22 Street S., west of S. Kenmore Street	Arlington County		38°50′59″N 77°05′10″W	
Nauck	24th Street S., west of S. Kenmore Street	Arlington County		38°50′54″N 77°05′07″W	
Green Valley	24th Road S., west of S. Kenmore Street	Arlington County		38°50′52″N 77°05′05″W	

===== Remnants of the Nauck line =====
- Station
  - Hunter Station, 2312 2nd Street S., Arlington. Now a private residence, the southeast side of the building's footprint conforms to the path of the streetcar rails that ran diagonally from northeast to southwest. Coordinates: 38°52′17″N 77°05′02″W
- Roads
  - S. Uhle Street between S. Courthouse Road and 2nd Street S., Arlington. Coordinates: 38°52′21″N 77°04′59″W
  - S. Walter Reed Drive between Columbia Pike and 13th Street S., Arlington. Coordinates: 38°51′41″N 77°05′13″W
  - N. Lynn Street between 17th and 19th streets, Arlington

==== Fairfax line ====
Construction of the Washington, Arlington and Falls Church Railroad's Fairfax line started in 1896. It reached Crossman's Grove in Falls Church by the summer of 1897 and the west side of town by November. Work paused and during the Spanish American War Camp Russel A. Alger was established past the western terminus of the rail line. In 1900, the city of Fairfax, feeling the need to be connected to a railroad, began work to convince the Washington, Arlington and Falls Church to extend the line to Fairfax, which it did in 1904. Worked started in the summer and was completed on Nov 28, 1904.

When completed, the line traveled from a terminus in front of the Fairfax County Courthouse in Fairfax City through Oakton, Vienna, Dunn Loring, Falls Church, and Ballston to Downtown Washington, D.C., and Rosslyn by way of Clarendon.

Trolleys of the Fairfax line began their trips at the old Courthouse, located at the southwest corner of Chain Bridge Road (now part of State Route 123) and Main Street (now part of State Route 236). The cars first ran westward along Main Street and then turned north at the site of the Fairfax Electric Depot (the terminus of the line until the depot burned in 1907) onto the present route of Railroad Avenue.

After crossing the present route of Fairfax Boulevard (U.S. Routes 29 and 50), the line crossed a branch of Accotink Creek and Chain Bridge Road (now Virginia State Route 123). The line then traveled northeast through Fairfax County a short distance east of Chain Bridge Road, crossed another branch of Accotink Creek, passed through Oakton, and reached the town of Vienna.

The line continued northeast in Vienna about a block southeast of Maple Avenue W. (Virginia State Route 123's present name in Vienna). After crossing Center Avenue S, the line's trolleys turned to the northwest on one of three legs of a triangular wye and crossed Maple Avenue E. After leaving the wye, the trolleys stopped at the line's Vienna station.

The Fairfax line's Vienna station was located in the center of town on the southeast side of Church Street NE, a short distance southeast of the tracks of the Southern Railway's Bluemont Branch, which became the W&OD Railway's Bluemont Division in 1912. The Southern's Vienna station (which remains intact on the southwest side of the W&OD Trail) was a block northwest of the Fairfax line's station.

As the Fairfax line's tracks ended near Church Street, trolleys left their station by reversing direction. They then recrossed Maple Avenue E and traveled southeast on a second leg of the wye that paralleled the Southern's tracks, with which there was an interchange. Freight and work cars usually bypassed the station and avoided reversing by turning from the northeast direction to the southeast on the third leg of the wye.

After leaving the wye, the line continued east in Vienna on Ninovan Road, paralleling the Southern's route. The line then crossed the Southern's tracks on a bridge built near Franklin in 1904. After the crossing, the line traveled east in Fairfax County along the present routes of Electric Avenue and Railroad Street (now parts of Virginia State Route 697) and within a railroad cut that is now in South Railway Street Park. The line then crossed the present route of the Capital Beltway (Interstate 495), travelled along the present route of Helena Drive, crossed the present route of Interstate 66 and continued to travel within Fairfax County until it reached the City of Falls Church.

The line continued eastward through Falls Church until it crossed W. Broad Street (now Virginia State Route 7). The line then travelled near the north side of the Southern Railway's tracks, following the present route of Lincoln Avenue until it reached Arlington County (named Alexandria County before 1920). After crossing Four Mile Run and Lee Highway (now part of U.S. Route 29), the line continued to travel eastward north of the Run and the Southern Railway while traveling near and along the present route of Fairfax Drive, which Interstate 66 (I-66) and the Washington Metro's Orange and Silver lines have partially replaced.

The Fairfax line then left the Southern's route, which continued southwest to Alexandria. Further along, the line left that of the present route of I-66, which travels northeast to Rosslyn.

The Fairfax line then traveled along the present paths of Fairfax Drive and the underground tracks of the Washington Metro. Between 1912 and its closing, the line traveled under a plate girder bridge at Waycroft that the W&OD Railway had constructed near the west end of Ballston for its Thrifton-Bluemont Junction connecting line, which I-66 later replaced north and northeast of Ballston.

After entering Ballston, the line passed a complex containing a car barn, rail yard, workshops, electrical substation and general office that the Washington, Arlington and Falls Church Railway had built in 1910 at Lacey near the present intersection of North Glebe Road (now Virginia State Route 120) and Fairfax Drive. Continuing eastward through Ballston on the present route of Fairfax Drive (now Virginia State Route 237), the line reached Clarendon, where it branched.

The North Arlington branch continued to follow the route of Fairfax Drive (now partially replaced by Clarendon Boulevard) through and past Clarendon. The branch then traveled downhill on the present route of Fairfax Drive along the north side of Rocky Run, which U.S. Route 50 now covers.

Approaching Rosslyn, the North Arlington branch turned to the north at Fort Myer Junction and joined the Nauck line. The combined lines then continued north along the present route of N. Lynn Street, joined the Rosslyn branch, and ended near the Aqueduct Bridge at the railroad's Rosslyn terminal.

Beginning in 1906, travelers on the North Arlington and Rosslyn branches and the Nauck line could transfer at the Rosslyn terminal to the Great Falls and Old Dominion Railroad (later the Great Falls Division of the W&OD Railway), which ran a "bridge car" that crossed the Potomac River into Georgetown on the Aqueduct Bridge. After the Rosslyn branch closed in 1921 and the Aqueduct Bridge closed in 1923, travelers on the North Arlington Branch and the Nauck line would transfer in Rosslyn to the electric streetcars of the Capital Traction and (later) Capital Transit Companies, which crossed the Potomac on the Francis Scott Key Bridge.

After leaving Clarendon, trolleys on the South Arlington branch largely followed the future routes of Washington Boulevard and Southgate Drive. The branch crossed the Nauck line at Hatfield Junction and joined the Rosslyn branch at Mount Vernon Junction (which received its name because the Rosslyn branch was a part of the Washington, Alexandria, and Mount Vernon Railway when the South Arlington branch first reached it). After leaving Mount Vernon Junction, the branch's trolleys traveled on the Rosslyn branch's tracks until they reached Arlington Junction, where they joined the Washington-Mount Vernon line.

After entering the tracks of the Washington-Mount Vernon line, the South Arlington branch's trolleys (some of which had originated in Fairfax City) crossed the Potomac River on the 1872 Long Bridge and, later, on the Highway Bridge. Their trips ended at the downtown Washington station.

I-66 and the Custis Trail now travel from Lee Highway (U.S. Route 29) in East Falls Church to Ballston on or near the Fairfax line's right of way along the former route of Fairfax Drive. Washington Metro's Orange and Silver Lines now follow the route of the Fairfax line and its North Arlington branch from Lee Highway in East Falls Church to N. Lynn Street in Rosslyn.

===== Fairfax line stations =====
The stations of the Fairfax line were (with locations of sites in 2008):

Station	Location	Jurisdiction	Notes	Coordinates	Images
Fairfax Courthouse	Main Street (Virginia State Route 236) and Chain Bridge Road (Virginia State Route 123)	City of Fairfax	After 1907. There was a waiting room in the Adams Hotel called The Wilcoxen Tavern, located on the NE corner of Main Street and Chain Bridge Road (then known as Payne Street) until the hotel was torn down to build the Fairfax National Bank building in 1930.	38°50′47″N 77°18′25″W	
Fairfax Electric Depot	Main Street (Virginia State Route 236) and Railroad Avenue	City of Fairfax	1904–1907; Replaced by freight depot. Historical marker at site: Arlington-Fairfax Electric Railway This was located on a separate spur that broke from the main line between current-day Moore and Oliver streets.	38°50′54″N 77°18′46″W	
Cedar Avenue	Cedar Avenue	City of Fairfax		38°51′13″N 77°18′36″W	
Wiley	Chain Bridge Road (Virginia State Route 123) between Fairfax Boulevard (U.S. Route 29/U.S. Route 50) and Eaton Place	City of Fairfax		38°51′38.3″N 77°18′25.9″W	Stryker Tract, Fairfax, VA 1919 showing Washington, Arlington, and Falls Church railway on left, with locations of Wiley, Blake, and Sanger stations
Martinique					
Blake	Blake Lane	Fairfax County		38°52′37″N 77°18′02″W	
Sanger		Fairfax County			
Oakton	2923 Gray Street (between Pine Street and Oakton Drive)	Fairfax County	Contained a post office and general store. Built in 1905. Preserved by Northern Virginia Conservation Trust. Station listed on National Register of Historic Places in 1995.	38°52′46″N 77°17′49″W	Oakton Trolley Station (2012)
Edgelea	Edgelea Road and Courthouse Road	Fairfax County		38°52′57″N 77°17′22″W	
Shockey	Hidden Road	Fairfax County		38°53′04″N 77°17′08″W	
Five Oaks	Sutton Road	Fairfax County		38°53′13″N 77°16′55″W	
Bothwell		Fairfax County			
Lewis Street	Wade Hampton Drive SW and Millwood Court SW	Town of Vienna		38°53′43″N 77°16′17″W	
Library	Library Lane SW	Town of Vienna		38°53′49″N 77°16′10″W	
Courthouse Road	Courthouse Road SW	Town of Vienna		38°53′56″N 77°16′01″W	
Vienna	Near Dominion Road NE and Church Street NE	Town of Vienna	Undated Photo; Undated photo of center-door trolley car running from Arlington & Fairfax Railway's Vienna station towards Oakton and Fairfax City; Undated photo looking west toward Washington-Virginia Railway station and Washington & Old Dominion Railway station	38°54′11″N 77°15′56″W	
Park Street	Park Street SE and Ninovan Road SE	Town of Vienna		38°54′03″N 77°15′34″W	
Tydidi (?)			Name uncertain		
Franklin	Intersection of Electric Avenue and Follin Lane SE	Town of Vienna	Northeast of crossing of the W&OD Railway's Bluemont Division	38°54′01″N 77°14′41″W	
Woodford	Electric Avenue and Woodford Road	Fairfax County		38°54′06″N 77°14′21″W	
East Woodford	Electric Avenue	Fairfax County			
Wedderburn Heights	Electric Avenue	Fairfax County			
Enola	Electric Avenue and Cedar Lane	Fairfax County		38°53′55″N 77°13′43″W	
Dunn Loring	Railroad Street and Gallows Road	Fairfax County		38°53′52″N 77°13′28″W	
Robey		Fairfax County			
Idlewood	Idlewood Road (Virginia State Route 695) and Helena Drive	Fairfax County		38°53′42″N 77°12′43″W	
Burr		Fairfax County			
Antrum					
West Falls Church (West End)	1101 West Broad Street (Virginia State Route 7) near Falls Avenue	City of Falls Church	Station at stationmaster's residence. Undated photo	38°53′32″N 77°11′13″W	
East Falls Church	Lee Highway (U.S. Route 29) (west side) and Fairfax Drive (north side)	Arlington County	Ticket depot and post office in grocery store. Undated photo. Undated photo	38°53′15″N 77°09′43″W	
Ashdale (Fairfax Junction)	I-66 near N. Roosevelt Street	Arlington County		38°53′07″N 77°09′15″W	
Hyson	I-66 near N. Quesada Street	Arlington County	Named for I.S. Hyson	38°53′03″N 77°09′07″W	
Heights	I-66 between N. Quantico and N. Potomac Street	Arlington County		38°53′02″N 77°09′01″W	
Highland Park	I-66 near N. Powhattan Street	Arlington County		38°52′59″N 77°08′53″W	
Upton	N. Ohio Street (east side) and I-66	Arlington County	Near Fostoria Station of W&OD Railway's Bluemont Division	38°52′57″N 77°08′46″W	
Kearney	N. Kennesaw Street and I-66	Arlington County	Named for Blanche Kearney	38°52′47″N 77°08′17″W	
Torreyson	I-66, east of Patrick Henry Drive	Arlington County	Named for A. Duke Torryson	38°52′47″N 77°08′17″W	
Veitch Summit	N. Jefferson Street and Fairfax Drive	Arlington County	Named for George A. Veitch	38°52′48″N 77°07′53″W	
Mulhall	N. Harrison Street (west side) and Fairfax Drive	Arlington County	Named for Bertha A. Mulhall	38°52′48″N 77°07′42″W	
Sunnyside	N. Edison Street and Fairfax Drive	Arlington County		38°52′51″N 77°07′24″W	
Burch	Fairfax Drive, east of N. George Mason Drive	Arlington County	Named for Mary S. Burch	38°52′53″N 77°07′17″W	
Waycroft	N. Buchanan Street and I-66	Arlington County	West of crossing of the Thrifton-Bluemont Junction connecting line of the W&OD Railway's Bluemont Division.	38°52′54″N 77°07′10″W	
Lacey Car Barn	907 N. Glebe Road (Virginia State Route 120)	Arlington County	In rail yard east of crossing of the Thrifton-Bluemont Junction connecting line of the W&OD Railway's Bluemont Division. Historical marker at site: Lacey Car Barn; Present site of Marymount University Ballston Center	38°52′57″N 77°07′00″W	
Lacey	N. Glebe Road (Virginia State Route 120) (west side) and Fairfax Drive (south side)	Arlington County	Named for Robert S. Lacey	38°52′55″N 77°06′58″W	
Ballston	N. Stuart Street (east side) and Fairfax Drive (Virginia State Route 237) (north side)	Arlington County	Opposite side of Fairfax Drive from Ballston-MU Metrorail station entrance. Historical marker near site: Ballston	38°52′57″N 77°06′42″W	
Bolivar (Utopia)	N. Pollard Street (west side) and Fairfax Drive (Virginia State Route 237)	Arlington County		38°52′57″N 77°06′24″W	
Farlee	N. Nelson Street and Fairfax Drive (Virginia State Route 237)	Arlington County	Near Virginia Square-GMU Metrorail station	38°52′59″N 77°06′15″W	
Belaire	Fairfax Drive (Virginia State Route 237)	Arlington County			
Clarendon	N. Washington Boulevard and Clarendon Boulevard	Arlington County	Junction with North Arlington branch and South Arlington branch Circa 1910 photo of Clarendon station 1950s aerial photograph of Clarendon Circle, showing abandoned trolley line tracks Near Clarendon Metrorail station	38°53′10″N 77°05′46″W	

===== Remnants of the Fairfax line =====
When the company switched to auto-railers, it sold its electric car fleet. Some went to Canada, with at least one going to the Niagara, St. Catharines and Toronto Railway. Another one was apparently sold to Ben L. Cross and used as a diner near Centreville, Virginia; that was demolished by 1971.

After the company went bankrupt in 1939, it sold its fleet of auto-railers to many buyers within the United States. The W&OD Railroad purchased four that remained in Arlington for several years. The W&OD used two (W&OD 96 and 97; former Arlington & Fairfax 113 and 114) for general maintenance and repairs; the railroad built on top of 97 a platform that its workers used until 1944 to repair the track's overhead electric lines. The W&OD used 96 to transport train crews until it scrapped the car in 1946.

In 1995, the Chicago South Shore and South Bend Railroad acquired a former Arlington & Fairfax auto-railer that had a platform on the roof that the railroad used for working on the overhead wires in East Chicago, Indiana. The Arcade & Attica Railroad purchased two others. A third was sold to the Coudersport & Port Allegany Railroad in 1940 and scrapped in 1953.

In 1946, a portion of the right-of-way in Arlington County was purchased for the construction of Fairfax Drive, which bears the railway's name. In 1947, the Arlington and Fairfax Motor Transportation Company, the surviving portion of the Arlington and Fairfax Auto Railroad Company, merged with the Arnold Lines (a.k.a. Washington, Virginia and Maryland Coach Company). The company's remaining assets transferred to the "A & F Corporation". The A & F Corporation was legally dissolved during the following year.

In 1958, a fire damaged the Lacey car barn, which was located at the northwest corner of N. Glebe Road and Fairfax Drive. The building was already marked for demolition to make room for a bowling alley, but the fire sped up its demise. The car barn was built in 1910, when the line was double-tracked, to replace one that was located several blocks east at the northwest corner of N. Stafford Street and Fairfax Drive.

In 1964, the WVMCC was purchased by DC Transit, which the Washington Metropolitan Area Transit Authority acquired in 1973. The portion of the Authority's bus system that is within Arlington and Fairfax Counties is therefore a legacy of the A&F.

Surviving remnants of the Fairfax line include:

- Station
  - Oakton Station, 2923 Gray Street (between Pine Street and Oakton Drive), Fairfax County. Now a private residence. Includes rail and a raised trolley roadbed.
- Roads
  - Railroad Avenue, Fairfax City. Coordinates: 38°50′57″N 77°18′43″W
  - Farr Avenue, Fairfas City.
  - Ninovan Road SE, Vienna. Coordinates: 38°53′59″N 77°15′03″W
  - Electric Avenue, Vienna and Fairfax County. Coordinates: 38°54′06″N 77°14′17″W
  - Railroad Street, Fairfax County. Coordinates: 38°53′53″N 77°13′23″W
  - Helena Drive, Fairfax County. Coordinates: 38°53′43″N 77°12′45″W
  - Lincoln Avenue, Falls Church. Coordinates: 38°53′27″N 77°10′27″W
  - I-66 between N. Sycamore Street and N. Kennebec Street, Arlington. Coordinates: 38°52′55″N 77°08′41″W
  - I-66 between N. Harrison Street and N. Edison Street, Arlington. Coordinates: 38°52′49″N 77°07′30″W
  - Fairfax Drive, Arlington. Coordinates: 38°52′56″N 77°06′37″W
- Bridge remnants
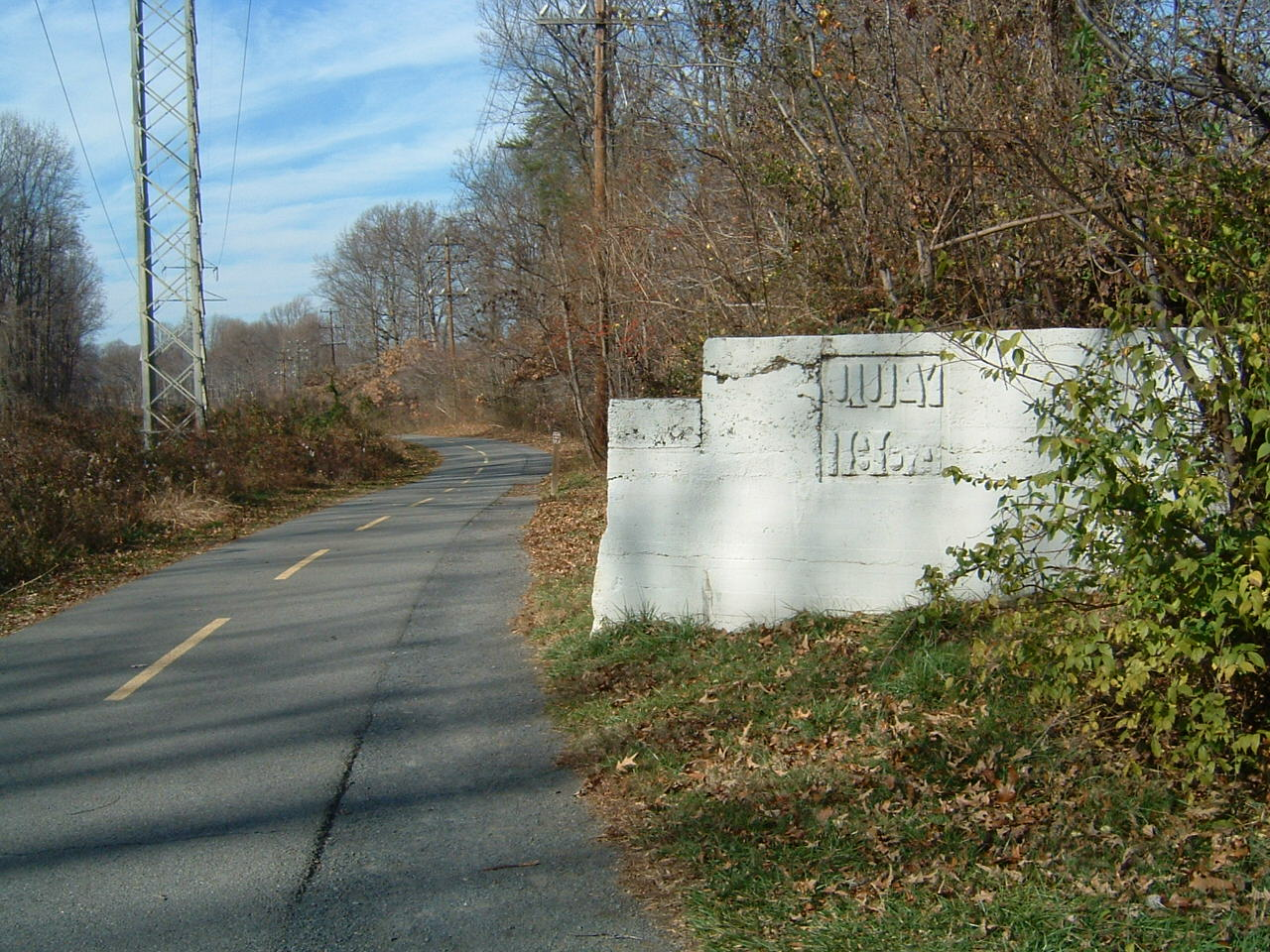
  One abutment of the bridge that carried the Fairfax line over the W&OD Railway at Franklin
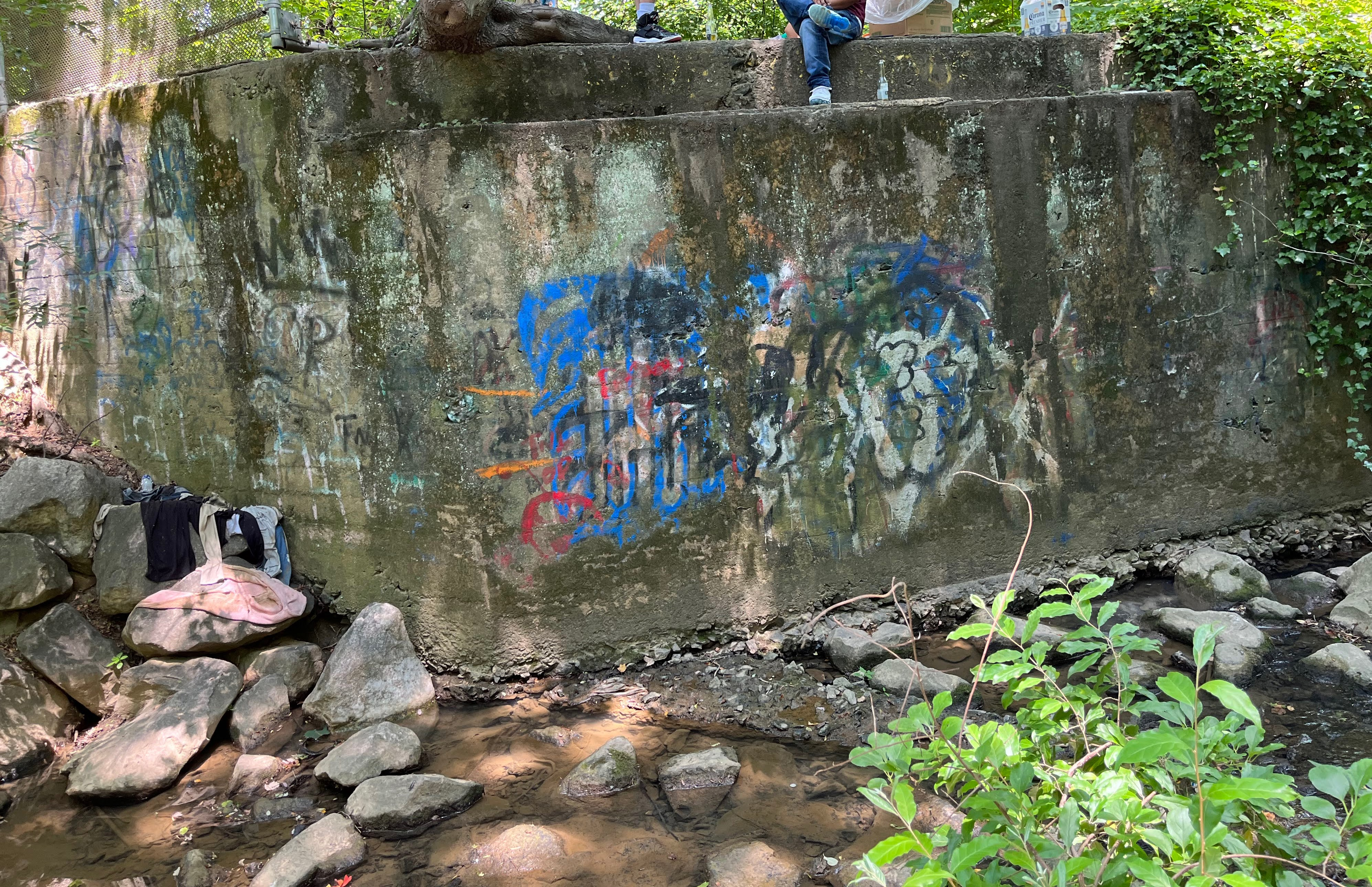
  Remaining abutment of the bridge that carried the Fairfax line over Accotink Creek/Mosby Woods Tributary
  - Poured concrete railroad bridge abutment on north side of Washington & Old Dominion Railroad Trail between Electric Avenue and Ninovan Road, Vienna. Built in July 1904, according to engravings on its east side. Coordinates: 38°54′00″N 77°14′45″W
  - Stone railroad bridge abutment on south side of Washington and Old Dominion Railroad Trail between Electric Avenue and Ninovan Road, Vienna. Coordinates: 38°53′59″N 77°14′45″W
  - Abutments and wing walls of demolished railroad bridge over branch of Accotink Creek between Fairfax Village Drive and Cardinal Road, Fairfax City. Coordinates: 38°51′50″N 77°18′16″W
  - Poured concrete railroad bridge over branch of Accotink Creek near the intersection of Chain Bridge Road and Fairfax Boulevard, behind the 29 Diner in Fairfax City. Coordinates: 38°51′31″N 77°18′32″W
- Embankment
  - Approximately 1/3 of a mile of embankment remains between Railroad Avenue and Farr Avenue in Fairfax. It contains a social trail.
  - Approximately half of a mile of embankment remains between I-66 and a parking lot at 10402 Eaton Place in Fairfax. It contains a social trail.
- Trails
  - Unpaved trails and trolley cut between Gallows Road and Morgan Lane in South Railroad Street Park, Dunn Loring, Fairfax County. Coordinates: 38°53′51″N 77°13′10″W

==== North Arlington branch ====
Constructed by the Washington, Arlington and Falls Church Railroad as part of the Fairfax line, the North Arlington branch of the Washington—Virginia Railway connected Clarendon and Rosslyn. The branch traveled northeast from Clarendon along the present routes of Clarendon Boulevard, Fairfax Drive and N. Lynn Streets, approximating the present underground routes of Washington Metro's Orange and Silver lines. The branch turned to the north when joining the Nauck line at Fort Myer Junction, joined the Rosslyn Branch while traveling north along the present route of N. Lynn Street and ended near the Aqueduct Bridge at the railroad's Rosslyn terminal.

The Rosslyn terminal was removed in late 1939, along with the W&OD station nearby, to create Rosslyn Plaza as an improved gateway to DC and to allow the George Washington Parkway to pass under the Frances Scott Key Bridge. Capital Transit continued to run streetcars across the bridge until 1956, when they stopped service rather than pay to install new tracks as part of the project to widen the Key Bridge. The last streetcar in the Commonwealth of Virginia left Rosslyn on August 26, 1956. The tracks around Rosslyn Circle were removed in late 1959.

===== North Arlington branch stations =====
The stations of the North Arlington branch (Clarendon-Fairfax branch of Washington-Virginia Railway) were (with locations of sites in 2008):

Station	Location	Jurisdiction	Notes	Coordinates
Clarendon	N. Washington Boulevard and Clarendon Boulevard	Arlington County	Junction with North Arlington branch and South Arlington branch Circa 1910 photo of Clarendon station 1950s aerial photograph of Clarendon Circle, showing abandoned trolley line tracks Near Clarendon Metrorail station	38°53′10″N 77°05′46″W
Spruce Street	Clarendon Boulevard and N. Fillmore Street (northeast side)	Arlington County		38°53′17″N 77°05′35″W
Oak Street	Clarendon Boulevard and N. Edgewood Street (northeast side)	Arlington County		38°53′18″N 77°05′30″W
Walnut Street	Fairfax Drive and N. Cleveland Street	Arlington County		38°53′18″N 77°05′22″W
Chestnut Street	Fairfax Drive an N. Barton Street (southeast side)	Arlington County		38°53′16″N 77°05′18″W
Courtlands		Arlington County		
Court House	Fairfax Drive (U.S. Route 50 service road) and N. Courthouse Road (northeast side)	Arlington County		38°53′12″N 77°04′59″W
Murphy	Fairfax Drive (U.S. Route 50 service road) between N. Rhodes Street and N. Rolfe Street, Arlington	Arlington County		38°53′21″N 77°04′45″W
McCombs	Fairfax Drive (U.S. Route 50 service road)	Arlington County		
Baltimore Street	Fairfax Drive (U.S. Route 50 service road) and N. Quinn Street	Arlington County		38°53′24″N 77°04′41″W
Wolz (Woltz)	Fairfax Drive (U.S. Route 50 service road) and N. Queen Street	Arlington County		38°53′27″N 77°04′38″W
Military Road	Fairfax Drive (U.S. Route 50 service road), between the north end of N. Ode Street and the south end of Fort Myer Drive	Arlington County		38°53′29″N 77°04′31″W
Heights	Fairfax Drive (U.S. Route 50 service road), north of the north end of N. Nash Street	Arlington County	Named for Radnor Heights	38°53′33″N 77°04′22″W
Fort Myer Junction	East of intersection of Fairfax Drive and N. Lynn Street	Arlington County	Junction with Nauck line	38°53′36″N 77°04′15″W
Rosslyn	N. Lynn Street near Key Bridge Marriott Hotel	Arlington County	East of W&OD Railway station	38°53′59″N 77°04′15″W

===== Remnants of North Arlington branch =====
- Roads
  - Clarendon Boulevard, Arlington. Coordinates: 38°53′17″N 77°05′34″W
  - Fairfax Drive, Arlington. Coordinates: 38°53′15″N 77°05′14″W

==== South Arlington branch ====
In 1907, the Washington, Arlington and Falls Church Railroad constructed the South Arlington branch (or "Clarendon Cutoff") to connect the railway's North Arlington branch to the Washington, Alexandria, and Mount Vernon's Rosslyn branch. The place they met was called Mt. Vernon Junction. The route allowed riders to go directly from Clarendon into DC. After most of the Rosslyn branch closed in 1921, the South Arlington branch continued along the remaining route of that branch until it reached Arlington Junction, where it connected with the railway's Washington-Mount Vernon line.

Eastbound trolleys using the branch while traveling to downtown Washington began their trips on the Fairfax line and entered the branch at Clarendon. The branch traveled from Clarendon southeast along the present route of Washington Boulevard and crossed the western boundary of the Arlington Reservation and Fort Myer.

After entering the Fort, the South Arlington branch crossed the Fort Myer-Nauck line at Hatfield Junction. The branch then traveled south until leaving the Fort and other federal property within the Reservation when crossing the Reservation's southern boundary near the Fort's present South Gate.

The branch then traveled east along the present route of Southgate Road, now immediately south of Henderson Hall, Fort Myer and Arlington National Cemetery. After passing the Cemetery's southeast corner, the branch reached Mt. Vernon Junction, where it joined the Rosslyn branch, which was originally a branch of the Washington, Alexandria and Mt. Vernon Electric Railroad.

===== South Arlington branch stations =====
The stations of the South Arlington branch of the Washington—Virginia Railway with locations of sites in 2008) were:

Station	Location	Jurisdiction	Notes	Coordinates
Clarendon	Washington Boulevard and Clarendon Boulevard	Arlington County	Junction with Fairfax line and North Arlington branch Circa 1910 photo of Clarendon station 1950s aerial photograph of Clarendon Circle, showing abandoned trolley line tracks Near Clarendon Metrorail station	38°53′10″N 77°05′46″W
South Spruce Street	Washington Boulevard and 10th Street N.	Arlington County		38°53′03″N 77°05′34″W
Vinson (Lyon Park)	Washington Boulevard and N. Pershing Drive	Arlington County		38°52′51″N 77°05′26″W
Hatfield (Hatfield Junction)	In Fort Myer, southwest of the intersection of Pershing Drive and Sheridan Avenue; east of Washington Boulevard (Virginia State Route 27) and southeast of Arlington Boulevard (U.S. Route 50)	Arlington County	Crossing of Fort Myer-Nauck line	38°52′26″N 77°04′55″W
St. John	In Fort Myer, near the Hatfield Gate; west of the intersection of Sheridan Avenue and Carpenter Drive	Arlington County		38°52′21″N 77°04′48″W
Radio	In Fort Myer; near Hobson Drive, MacArthur Circle and Carpenter Drive	Arlington County	In Fort Myer, northeast of the NAA (Arlington Naval Radio Station, now the Naval Support Facility Arlington)	38°52′11″N 77°04′33″W
Syphax	Southgate Road and S. Oak Street	Arlington County	Named for the estate of Maria Syphax	38°52′08″N 77°04′15″W
Clark	Between Southgate Road and the United States Air Force Memorial	Arlington County	Named for John W. Clark	38°52′10″N 77°04′00″W
Mount Vernon Junction	Near present east crossing of Columbia Pike (Virginia State Route 244) and Washington Boulevard (Virginia State Route 27)	Arlington County	Junction with Rosslyn branch of the Washington, Alexandria, and Mount Vernon Railway	38°52′11″N 77°03′42″W
Relee	I-395 between S. Fern Street and S. Eads Street, south of The Pentagon	Arlington County	Named for Robert E. Lee	38°51′56″N 77°03′20″W
Arlington Junction	Between Army-Navy Drive and 12th Street S. and between S. Eads Street and Richmond Highway (U.S. Route 1)	Arlington County	Junction with Washington-Mount Vernon line of Washington, Alexandria, and Mount Vernon Railway	38°51′50″N 77°03′12″W

===== Remnant of South Arlington branch =====
- Roads
  - Washington Boulevard, Arlington. Coordinates: 38°52′44″N 77°05′20″W

== Historic designations ==
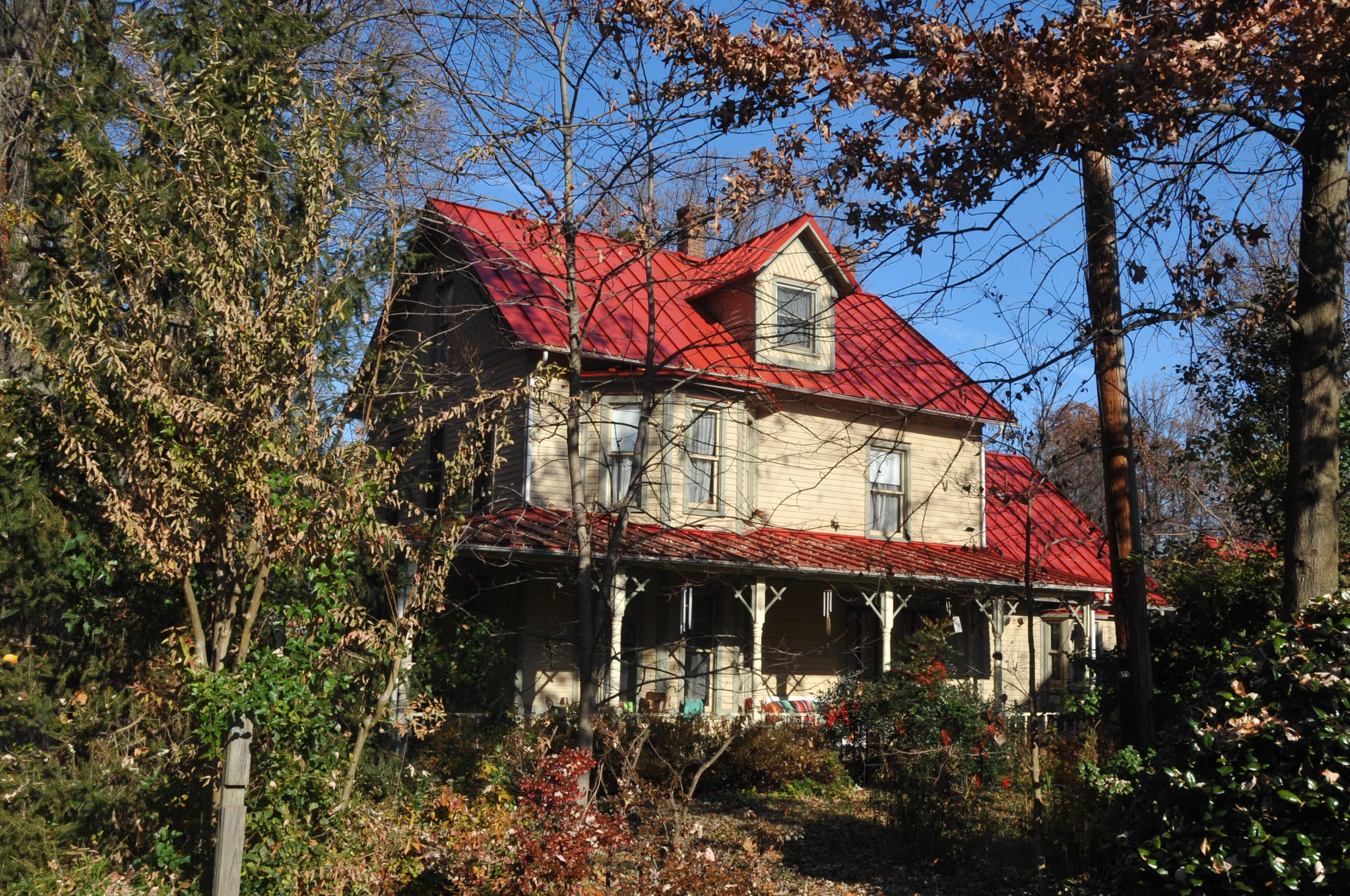
Oakton trolley station (2012)

On October 19, 1994, the Virginia Department of Historic Resources (VDHR) added the Oakton trolley station to the Virginia Landmarks Register (VDHR identification number 029-0477). The National Park Service subsequently added the trolley station to the National Register of Historic Places (NRHP) on February 8, 1995 (NHRP identification number: 95000026).

VDHR staff have determined that several other properties associated with the Washington and Virginia Railway Company/Washington, Arlington and Falls Church Electric Railway (VDHR identification number 029-5470) are not eligible for listing on the NHRP. As of February 6, 2018, the staff had not found any other such properties to be eligible for this listing.

== Maps ==
- Expandable 1892 map of Washington, D.C., and suburbs, showing the route of the Washington and Arlington Railway (not labeled) between Rosslyn and Arlington National Cemetery's Fort Myer Gate: Averill, F.L., First Lieutenant, Commanding Platoon (1892). "Map of Washington, D.C. and Suburbs, Showing the Latest Streets and All the New Street-Car Routes". Washington, D.C.: District of Columbia National Guard: Engineer Corps: Engineering Platoon. Republished by the Citizens Executive Committee, 26th National Encampment, Grand Army of the Republic, Washington, D.C. (1892) – via Hudson, Murray: Antique Maps, Globes, Books & Prints (www.antiquemapsandglobes.com).
- 1894 topographic map of the city of Alexandria, Alexandria County, Falls Church and eastern Fairfax County, showing the route of the Washington, Alexandria and Mount Vernon Railway (not labeled) between the city of Alexandria and Mount Vernon: Gannett, Henry; Thompson, Gilbert (November 1894). "Reconnaissance Map: Virginia – Maryland: Mt. Vernon Sheet". United States Department of the Interior: United States Geological Survey – via Virginia Historical Topographic Maps, Perry–Castañeda Library Map Collection, Perry–Castañeda Library, University of Texas at Austin, Austin, Texas.
- 1894 topographic map of the city of Alexandria, Alexandria County, Falls Church and northeastern Fairfax County, showing the route of the Washington, Alexandria and Mount Vernon Railway in the city of Alexandria and Fairfax County: "The Vicinity of Washington, D.C.: Entered according to Act of Congress, in the year 1894". Philadelphia: Griffith M. Hopkins, C.E. LCCN 88693364. OCLC 18019645 – via Library of Congress.
- 1898 topographic map of Washington, D.C., the city of Alexandria, Alexandria County (now Arlington County), Falls Church and northeastern Fairfax County, showing the routes of the Washington, Arlington & Falls Church Electric Railroad (W.A. & F.C. E.R.R.) and the Washington, Alexandria & Mt. Vernon Electric Railway (W. A. & MT. V. Electric R.R.): "Washington and Vicinity". Washington, D.C.: United States Department of the Interior: United States Geological Survey. 1898 – via University of Alabama Map Library.
- 1900 map of Alexandria County (now Arlington County) and the City of Alexandria, showing the routes of the Washington, Arlington & Falls Church Railway and the Washington, Alexandria & Mt. Vernon Electric Railway: Graham, Andrew B., photo-lithographer (1900). "Alexandria City showing connections to Washington". Alexandria, Virginia: M.B. Harlow. LCCN 89692658. OCLC 20094588 – via Library of Congress.
- 1900 map of Alexandria County (now Arlington County), showing the routes of the Washington, Arlington & Falls Church Electric Railway and the Washington, Alexandria & Mt. Vernon Electric Railway: "Map of Alexandria County, Virginia for the Virginia Title Co". Alexandria, Virginia: The Company. 1900. LCCN 89692758. OCLC 20854681 – via Library of Congress.
- November 1901 topographic map of the District of Columbia and northeastern Alexandria County (now Arlington County), showing the routes of the Washington, Arlington & Falls Church Railroad (not labeled) and the Washington, Alexandria & Mt. Vernon Electric Railroad (Wash. Alex. & Mt. Vernon Electric R.R.): Outhet, R. A. (November 1901). "Map of the District of Columbia Showing Areas Recommended to be Taken as Necessary for New Parks and Park Connections". Washington, D.C.: Commission on the Improvement of the Park System. LCCN 87694473. OCLC 16869886 – via Library of Congress.
- 1904 map of Alexandria County (now Arlington County), the city of Alexandria and northeastern Fairfax County showing the routes of the Washington, Arlington & Falls Church Railroad (W. A & F.C. R.R.) and the Washington, Alexandria & Mt. Vernon Railroad (Wash. Alex. & Mt.V. R.R.): "Map of electric railroads, steam railroads and streets in Washington and vicinity". Rand McNally & Co.'s Pictorial Guide to Washington. New York and Chicago: Rand McNally & Company. 1904. p. 5 – via Internet Archive.
- 1907 map of Alexandria County (now Arlington County) showing the routes of the Washington, Arlington & Falls Church Railway (W.A.&FC RY) and the Washington & Mt. Vernon Railway (WA. & MT. V RY): Reynolds, Charles A. (1907). "Map of Arlington and vicinity". Washington: The Nation's Capital. New York: Foster & Reynolds. p. 141 – via Internet Archive.

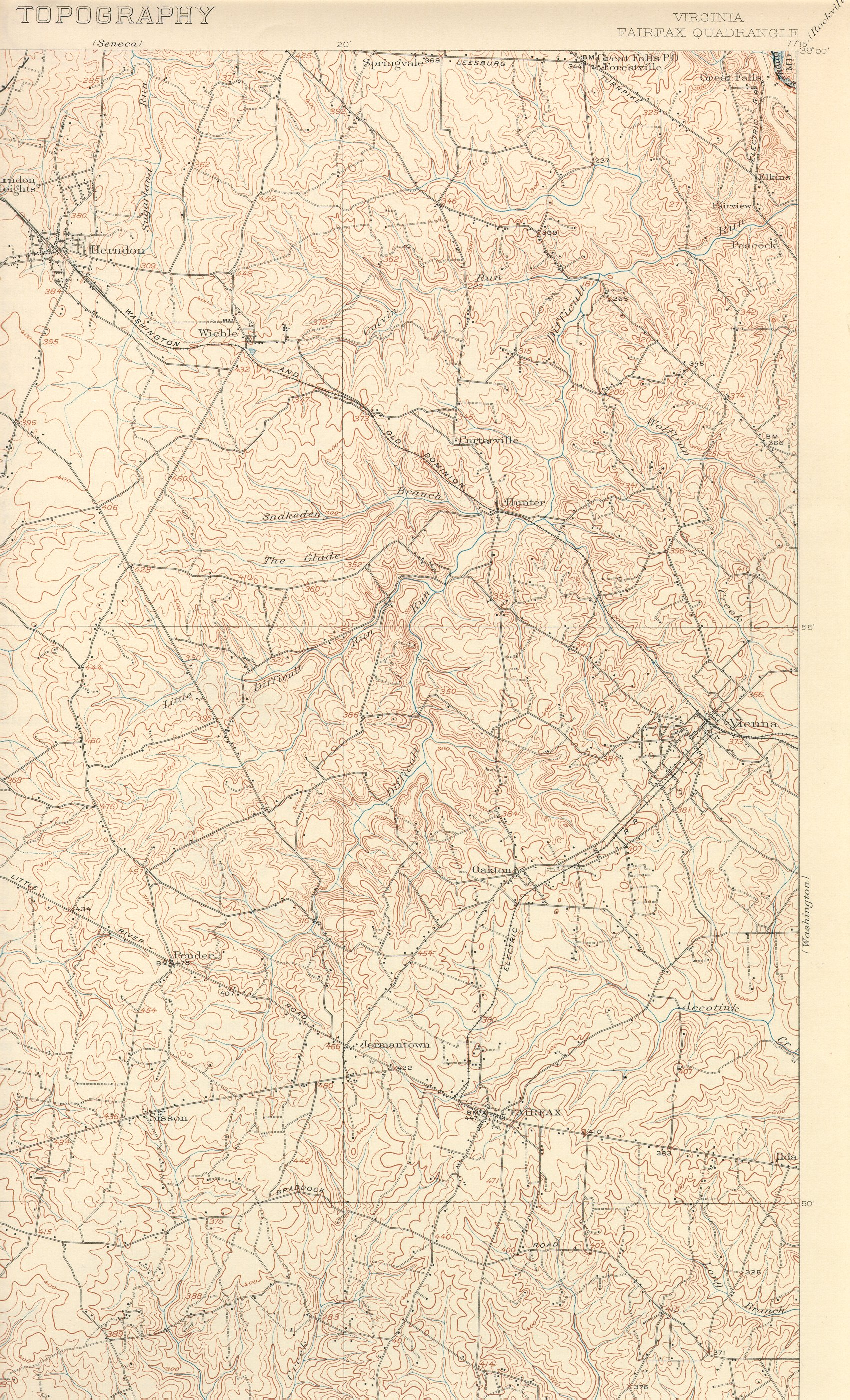
1915 topographic map of northwestern Fairfax County, showing the route of the Fairfax line of the Washington—Virginia Railway (Electric RR) between Vienna and the city of Fairfax and the routes of the Washington and Old Dominion Railway between Vienna and Herndon and between Difficult Run and Great Falls.

- 1907 map of Alexandria County, Virginia (now Arlington County), showing the routes of the Washington, Alexandria and Mt. Vernon Railway (W. A. & Mt V. RY.), the Washington, Arlington & Falls Church Railway (W. A. & F. C. RY.) and the Great Falls and Old Dominion Railway (G. F. & O. D. RY.): Noetzel, Gregor (1907). "Map of Alexandria County, Virginia: formerly part of the District of Columbia". Washington, D.C.: G.G. Boteler. LCCN 89692766. OCLC 20854717 – via Library of Congress website.
- 1915 topographic map of northwestern Fairfax County, showing the route of the Fairfax line of the Washington—Virginia Railway (Electric RR) between Vienna and the city of Fairfax and the routes of the Washington and Old Dominion Railway between Vienna and Herndon and between Difficult Run and Great Falls: Marshall, R. B.; Sutton, Frank (October 1915). "Topography: Virginia: Fairfax Quadrangle". Washington, D.C.: United States Department of the Interior: United States Geological Survey. Archived from the original on July 25, 2020 – via Historic Prince William.
- 1915 topographic map of Washington, D.C., the city of Alexandria, Alexandria County, Falls Church and northeastern Fairfax County, showing the routes of the Washington—Virginia Railway and the Washington and Old Dominion Railway: Marshall, R. B.; Sutton, Frank (1915). "Topography: Maryland — District of Columbia — Virginia, Washington and vicinity". Washington, D.C.: United States Department of the Interior: United States Geological Survey. LCCN 87691472 – via Library of Congress.
- "Washington—Virginia Railway system map". Washington—Virginia Railway Company. 1916 – via Facebook.
- 1917 topographic map of Washington, D.C., the city of Alexandria, Alexandria County, Falls Church and northeastern Fairfax County, showing the routes of the Washington—Virginia Railway and the Washington and Old Dominion Railway: Marshall, R. B.; Sutton, Frank (1917). "Washington and Vicinity: Maryland: District of Columbia: Virginia". Washington, D.C.: United States Department of the Interior: United States Geological Survey. LCCN 87691475. OCLC 15519039 – via Library of Congress.
- 1924 topographic map of the city of Alexandria and southeastern Fairfax County showing the Washington-Virginia Railway's route between Alexandria and Mount Vernon: "Virginia-Maryland: Fort Humphreys and Vicinity". United States Department of the Interior: United States Geological Survey. 1924 – via University of Alabama website.
- 1925 topographic map of south-central Maryland and southeastern Fairfax County showing the Washington—Virginia Railway's route in Fairfax County to Mt. Vernon: "State of Maryland Geological Survey: Maryland – Virginia: Indian Head Quadrangle". United States Department of the Interior: United States Geological Survey. 1925 – via Virginia Historical Topographic Maps, Perry–Castañeda Library Map Collection, Perry–Castañeda Library, University of Texas at Austin, Austin, Texas.
- 1929 topographic map of Washington, D.C., the city of Alexandria, Alexandria County, Falls Church and northeastern Fairfax County, showing the routes of the Arlington and Fairfax (A & F) Railway, the Mount Vernon, Alexandria and Washington (Mt V A and W) Railway and the Washington and Old Dominion Railway: "Washington and Vicinity: Maryland: District of Columbia: Virginia". Washington, D.C.: United States Department of the Interior: United States Geological Survey. 1929. LCCN 87693006. OCLC 15653164 – via Library of Congress.

== See also ==
- Washington streetcars
- Washington Metro
- Urban rail transit
- Bustitution
- Trolley park
