= History of surface transit in Northern Virginia =

Northern Virginia is part of the Washington Metropolitan Area of the United States, and its surface transit system is integrated with that of the city of Washington, D.C. However, because of the Potomac River separating Northern Virginia from the city, the two systems have evolved largely independently. At present, most major bus routes, including all that cross the Potomac, are operated by the Washington Metropolitan Area Transit Authority (WMATA), while several smaller systems are city- or county-owned. Since the Washington Metro opened to Virginia, most of the bus routes have terminated on either side of the Potomac River, where passengers can transfer to the rapid transit system, or to one of the few WMATA Metrobus routes that cross the river (Route A58).

== Trolleys ==
Northern Virginia did not have any street railways until 1892, when the Washington, Alexandria and Mount Vernon Electric Railway (WA&MV) opened an electric trolley line between Alexandria and Mount Vernon. It merged with the Washington, Arlington and Falls Church Railway (WA&FC) in 1913 to form the Washington-Virginia Railway. The company entered bankruptcy in 1924, and in 1927 the two former systems were split. The WA&MV was bought by the owner of the Alexandria, Barcroft and Washington Rapid Transit Company (AB&W), a competing line of buses, and last ran in 1932; the WA&FC was reorganized as the Arlington and Fairfax Railway and operated until 1939. A third system, the Washington and Old Dominion Railway (W&OD), began in the 1850s as the Alexandria, Loudoun and Hampshire Railroad, a steam railroad. It was leased by the newly formed W&OD, which in 1912 connected the line to the electrified Great Falls and Old Dominion Railroad. Electric trolleys last ran in 1941, but the company continued to operate freight trains (and passenger trains until 1951) until 1968.

== Local buses ==
=== WMATA Metrobus ===
Until 1973, when WMATA began operating buses, the local buses in Northern Virginia were operated by two companies. The AB&W mainly operated along and south of Columbia Pike, while the Washington, Virginia and Maryland Coach Company (WV&M) mainly operated along and north of Arlington Boulevard.

=== Alexandria, Barcroft and Washington Transit Company ===
The AB&W's was formed in 1921 by Robert L. May a DC police officer. He had moved to Barcroft, a few miles from DC and noticed people walking along Columbia Pike and thought it was a sign of a market to be tapped. He made his first passenger "bus" run on June 22, 1921, in a 12-seat Reo Speedwagon, charging 15 cents per ride. Business was so good that his wife started driving a converted truck to pick up more passengers.

At the same time other small bus lines, the largest being the Alexandria Motor bus line, were competing with the Washington and Alexandria trolley and cutting into its revenue. In 1923 May and the manager of the Alexandria line, L.W.Selfe, were told they would need a franchise from the state. Because Selfe shut down while waiting for his franchise, May was given the franchise and expanded his business into Alexandria. He moved his garage to the Del Ray neighborhood and gave his company the AB&W name. The first route was along Columbia Pike, now the Columbia Pike Line.

In 1927, May purchased the Alexandria and Suburban Motor Vehicle Company from the Mount Vernon, Washington and Alexandria (MVW&A)Railway. By 1930 he'd expanded service to Fort Humphrey.

In 1930 May acquired the MVW&A railway and started to substitute much of the trolley service with buses. That year service south of Alexandria ended when the government bought the right-of-way for the George Washington Memorial Parkway and in 1932 it ended altogether when it lost the right to go into the District.

Service was expanded to Franconia in 1947, to Springfield in 1950 and when the Woodrow Wilson Bridge opened in 1962 to Easton, MD. In 1969 it made use of the express lanes on the Shirley Highway. In 1973, with revenues dipping, it was sold to WMATA. At the time it was sold, May's son - Beverly C. May - was the president, his parents having died about a decade earlier.

=== Washington, Virginia and Maryland Coach Company ===
The WV&M acquired several routes in the late 1920s, mainly operating west from Rosslyn. In 1947, the WV&M absorbed the Arlington and Fairfax Motor Transportation Company, the successor to the Arlington & Fairfax Auto Railroad, but closed the route in 1948.

== Intercity buses ==
Until 1987, when Greyhound Lines acquired Continental Trailways (part of the Trailways Transportation System), there were two systems of intercity buses - Greyhound and Trailways - in Northern Virginia. As of 2007, the only two routes still operated are southwest to Charlottesville via U.S. Route 29 and south to Richmond via U.S. Route 1.

Greyhound's system once included three lines: one west to Winchester along State Route 7, operated by Capitol Greyhound Lines, one west to Winchester via U.S. Route 50, operated by Atlantic Greyhound Lines, and one south to Richmond via U.S. Route 1, operated by Richmond Greyhound Lines. These were all started in the 1920s and joined Greyhound by the early 1930s.

=== Virginia Trailways ===
Virginia Trailways, officially Virginia Stage Lines, had lines west on State Route 55 to Front Royal, west on U.S. Route 211 to Luray, southwest to Charlottesville via U.S. Route 29, and south to Richmond via U.S. Route 1 and State Route 2. The first one of these operated by Virginia Stage was to Charlottesville; by 1936, it was operating all four. The company joined Trailways and changed its business name to Virginia Trailways in 1938.
