= Great Falls and Old Dominion Railroad =

Former trolley line in Virginia

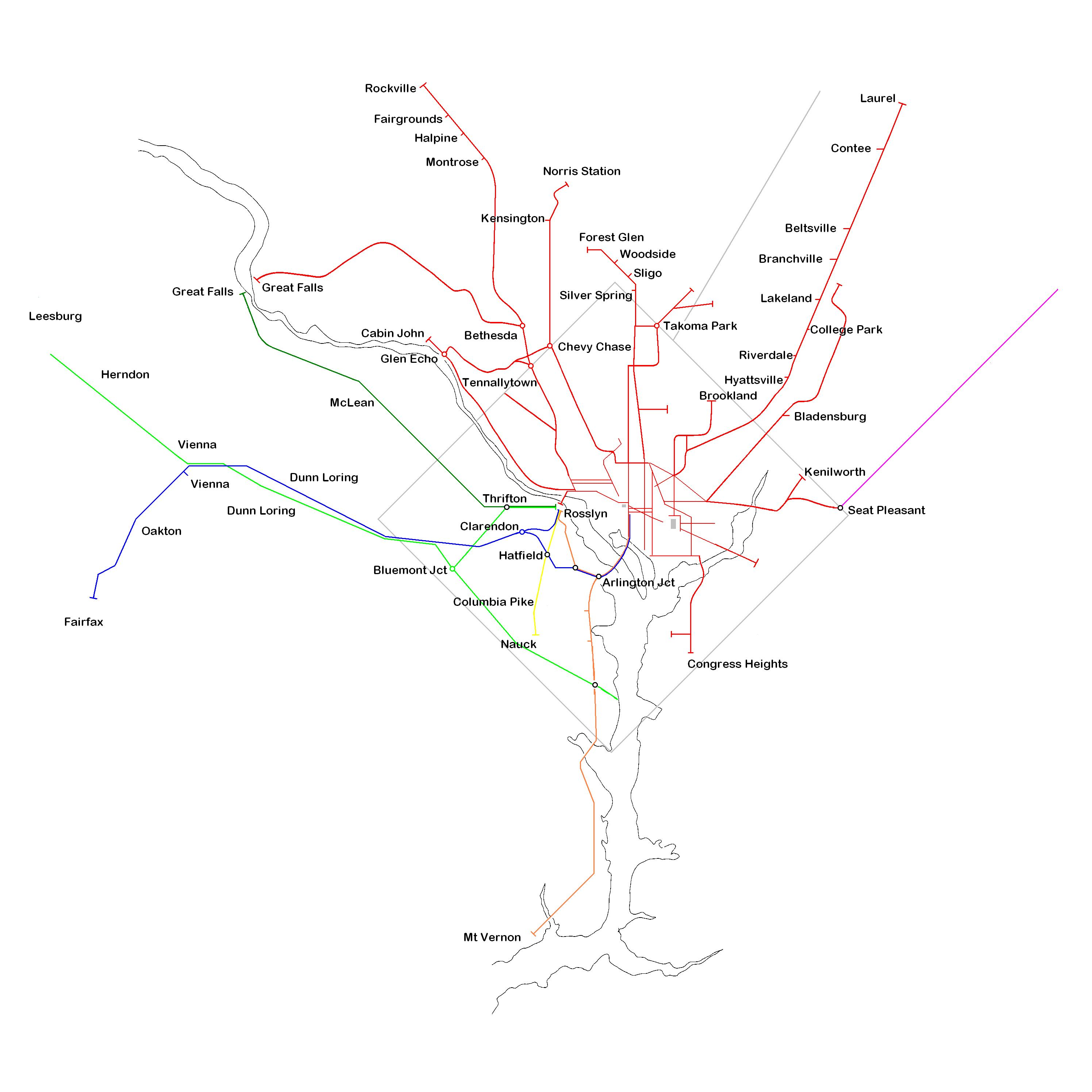
Diagram of Washington area trolley lines (enlargeable image showing Great Falls and Old Dominion Railroad in dark green)

The Great Falls and Old Dominion Railroad (GF&OD) was an interurban trolley line that ran in Northern Virginia during the early 20th century.

== History ==
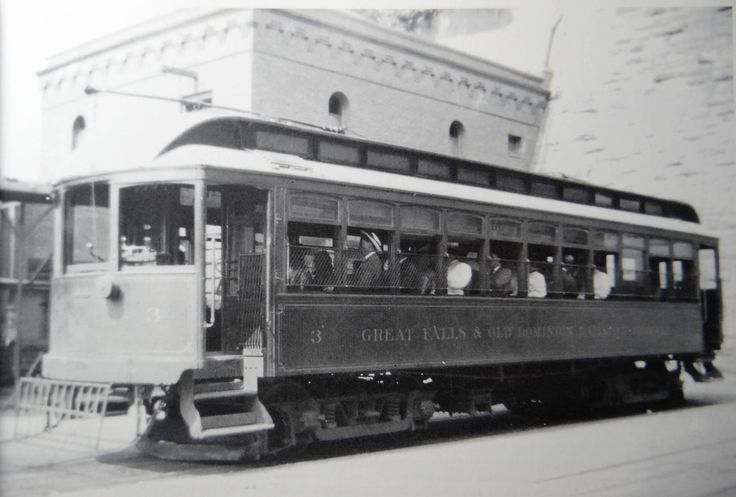
A trolley of the Great Falls and Old Dominion Railroad

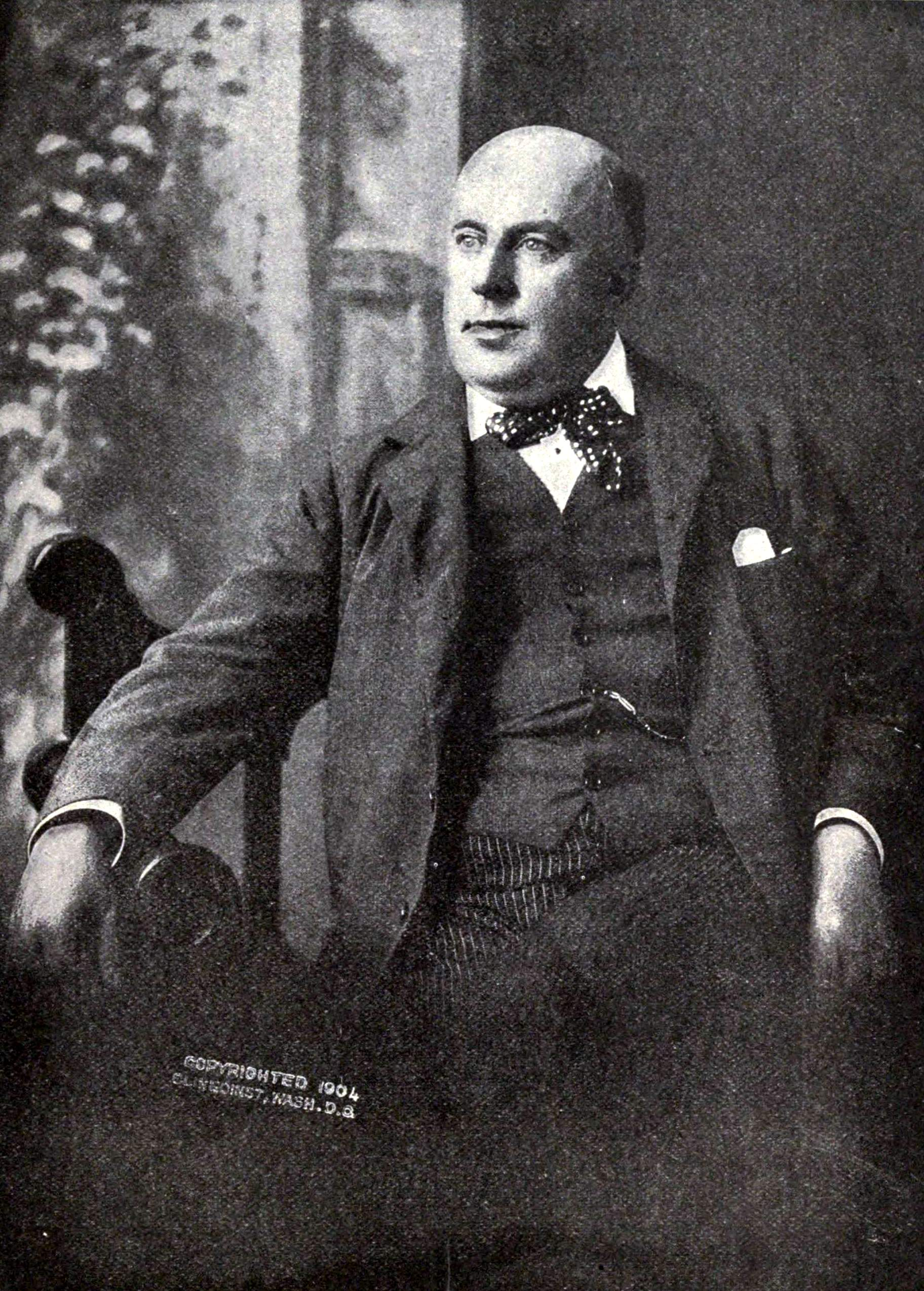
John Roll McLean (1904)

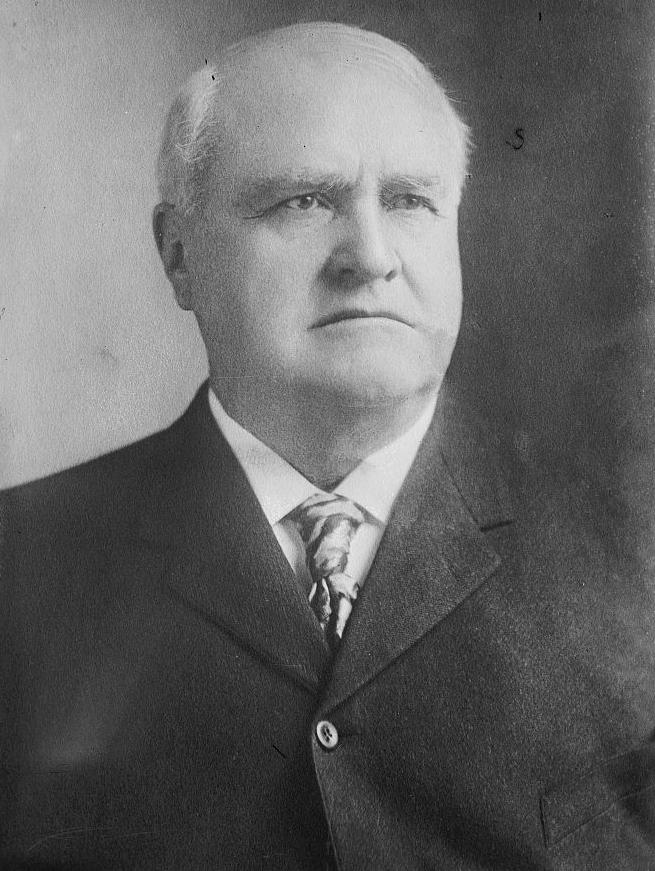
^{Library of Congress} Stephen Benton Elkins

Chartered in 1900 by a group of local landowners and acquired in 1902 by John Roll McLean (owner of The Washington Post) and Senator Stephen Benton Elkins, the 15-mile electrified railroad began operating from Georgetown in Washington, D.C., in 1906. The first trial run was in March 1906, but only went as far as Difficult Run and the first scheduled car reached Great Falls Park in Fairfax County, Virginia, on July 3 of that year. They laid a second track in 1908.

From Georgetown, the railroad crossed the Potomac River on a superstructure built on the upstream side of the old Aqueduct Bridge to Rosslyn in Arlington, where it made connections with an older electric trolley line, the Washington, Arlington & Falls Church Railway (see Northern Virginia trolleys). From Rosslyn, the railroad traveled northwest along the north side of Lee Highway (now part of U.S. Route 29) to Cherrydale and then on its own right-of-way (now Old Dominion Drive, Virginia State Route 309) in Arlington and Fairfax Counties through forests, farmland and fruit orchards, bypassing the existing villages of Lewinsville and Langley. At Great Falls, the GF&OD constructed a trolley park, which became a popular destination.

The owners gave their own names to two stations located at the railroad's crossings of major roads: McLean Station at Chain Bridge Road (Virginia State Route 123) and Elkins Station at Old Georgetown Pike (Virginia State Route 193). The station at Chain Bridge Road became a focus for development that evolved into the community of McLean, Virginia.

In 1911, McLean and Elkins incorporated the Washington & Old Dominion Railway (W&OD) and in 1912, the new W&OD signed a 50-year lease on the Southern Railway's Alexandria-Bluemont line. In the same year, it then constructed a double-tracked Bluemont Division connecting line that traveled between two new junctions in Arlington: Bluemont Junction on the Alexandria-Bluemont line and Thrifton Junction on the Georgetown-Great Falls line. The Georgetown-Great Falls line became the Great Falls Division of the W&OD, sharing trackage with the W&OD's Bluemont Division between Rosslyn and Thrifton Junction. In 1935, Fairfax and Arlington counties obtained the right-of-way west of Thrifton Junction in settlement of delinquent taxes. Most of the right-of-way was converted into Old Dominion Drive.

== Remnants ==
Not much remains of the Great Falls Division.

The right-of-way west of Thrifton Junction became Langston Blvd (formally Lee Highway) and Old Dominion Drive; and the right-of-way between the Key Bridge and Thrifton Junction became Interstate 66. The trestle over Difficult Run lasted until 1979, when it was replaced because it could not handle the loads required of it.

Great Falls Trolley Park became Great Falls Park, part of the National Park Service.

Several area names, like the town of McLean, also remain.

== Stations ==
The stations on the Great Falls Division of the W&OD (with locations of sites in 2008) were:

Station	Location	Coordinates	Jurisdiction	Side of Tracks	Photo	Notes
Georgetown	M Street, N.W., between 35th and 37th Streets, N.W.	38°54′19″N 77°04′13″W	District of Columbia	West		Terminal station of GF&OD and W&OD until 1923. Adjacent to Georgetown Car Barn, which served Washington's electric street cars.
Rosslyn	Passenger Terminal (1923 to 1938): Fort Myer Drive (west side) between George Washington Memorial Parkway and Lee Highway	38°53′58″N 77°04′18″W	Arlington County	West	Undated photo of front of station Undated colorized postcard & 1923 interior photo of passenger terminal 1948	The GF&OD and W&OD stopped at a passenger shelter from 1904 to 1923. The W&OD terminated behind a passenger station on Fort Myer Drive from 1923 to 1938. The railroad terminated near a maintenance shop in the present route of I-66 a short distance west of Fort Myer Drive from 1938 to 1964. All of the Rosslyn stations and termini were near the present site of the Key Bridge Marriott Hotel. Historical Marker: Rosslyn Station
Colonial	I-66 at N. Nash Street	38°53′55″N 77°04′25″W	Arlington County	South		
Rosslyn Freight House	I-66 near N. Oak Street	38°53′55″N 77°04′32″W	Arlington County	North	1959 circa 1963	
Mackeys	I-66 at N. Quinn Street	38°53′52″N 77°04′44″W	Arlington County	Northwest		
Park Lane	I-66 east of N. Uhle Street; north of Lee Highway	38°53′50″N 77°05′04″W	Arlington County	Southwest		
Pearce	I-66 near N. Adams Street	38°53′54″N 77°05′22″W	Arlington County	South		
Clark	I-66 near N. Calvert Street	38°53′52″N 77°05′35″W	Arlington County	South		Near east side of Spout Run.
Thrifton	I-66 between Lee Highway and Spout Run Parkway	38°53′48″N 77°05′53″W	Arlington County	South		North of Lyon Village shopping center near southeast end of Maywood Historic District. Named for Hugh A. Thrift. East of junction with Thrifton – Bluemont Junction connecting line.
Dominion Heights	Lee Highway (between traffic lanes) at N. Monroe Street (east side)	38°53′46″N 77°06′15″W	Arlington County	South		Adjacent to Maywood Historic District
Cherrydale	Intersection of Lee Highway and Old Dominion Drive at Military Road (east side)	38°53′49″N 77°06′30″W	Arlington County	Southwest	circa 1908	
Harrison	Old Dominion Drive at N. Thomas Street	38°53′58″N 77°06′51″W	Arlington County	South		
Greenwood (Lee Heights)	Old Dominion Drive at Lorcom Lane (northwest side); east of N. Upton Street	38°53′57″N 77°07′01″W	Arlington County	South		
Maplewood	Old Dominion Drive between traffic lanes north of Lee Highway; west of N. Abingdon Street	38°53′55″N 77°07′17″W	Arlington County	South		
Livingston (Livingstone Heights)	Old Dominion Drive at 24th Street N. (north side)	38°54′03″N 77°07′28″W	Arlington County	Southwest		24th Street N. was Livingstone Street prior to 1935 (named for Colin H. Livingstone)
Lyonhurst	Old Dominion Drive at 25th Street N.	38°54′07″N 77°07′33″W	Arlington County	Southwest		Named for the nearby estate of Frank Lyon (now Missionhurst)
Summit	Old Dominion Drive at 26th Street N. (southeast side)	38.902907°N 77.127108°W	Arlington County	Southwest		
Rixey	Old Dominion Drive at N. Glebe Road (east side)	38°54′15″N 77°07′43″W	Arlington County	Northeast	undated	Named for the nearby estate of Dr. Presley Marion Rixey. Marymount University now occupies the Rixey estate. Later station on southwest side of tracks.
Jewell	Old Dominion Drive at Rock Spring Road (north side)	38°54′28″N 77°07′58″W	Arlington County	Southwest	undated	Named for Charles Jewell
Vanderwerken	Old Dominion Drive at Little Falls Road (northwest side)	38°54′35″N 77°08′13″W	Arlington County	North		Named for Gilbert Vanderwerken
Franklyn Park (Franklin Park)	Old Dominion Drive at Franklin Park Road	38°54′55″N 77°08′54″W	Fairfax County	Northeast	1910 undated	
Rockwell	Old Dominion Drive near Dominion Crest Lane	38°55′06″N 77°09′00″W	Fairfax County	Southwest		
Chesterbrook	Old Dominion Drive at Kirby Road (northwest side)	38°55′18″N 77°09′13″W	Fairfax County	Northeast		
El Nido	Old Dominion Drive at Birch Road	38°55′26″N 77°09′42″W	Fairfax County	North		
Selva	Old Dominion Drive at 6th Place	38°55′35″N 77°09′57″W	Fairfax County	Southwest		
Viresco	Old Dominion Drive between Pimmit Run and Linway Terrace	38°55′44″N 77°10′04″W	Fairfax County	Northeast		Southeast side of B&O Railroad right-of-way
Lawnvale	Old Dominion Drive near Holmes Place	38°55′51″N 77°10′22″W	Fairfax County	Southwest		
McLean	Old Dominion Drive at Chain Bridge Road (northwest side)	38°56′03″N 77°10′40″W	Fairfax County	Northeast		Named for John Roll McLean
Ingleside	Old Dominion Drive at Ingleside Avenue	38°56′09″N 77°10′59″W	Fairfax County	Northeast		
Balls Hill	Old Dominion Drive at Balls Hill Road (east side)	38°56′30″N 77°11′39″W	Fairfax County	West		
Hitaffer	Old Dominion Drive at Swinks Mill Road (south side)	38°56′48″N 77°12′41″W	Fairfax County	Northeast		
Jackson	Old Dominion Drive northwest of Swinks Mill Road	38°56′51″N 77°12′50″W	Fairfax County	Southwest	undated	
Spring Hill	Old Dominion Drive at Spring Hill Road (east side)	38°57′10″N 77°13′35″W	Fairfax County	Northeast		
Prospect Hill	Old Dominion Drive at Bellview Place	38°57′30″N 77°14′11″W	Fairfax County	Northeast	undated	
Belleview	Old Dominion Drive at Bellview Road	38°57′40″N 77°14′25″W	Fairfax County	Southwest	undated	
Glendale	Old Dominion Drive at Towlston Road	38°58′12″N 77°14′58″W	Fairfax County	Southwest		
Peacock	Old Dominion Drive at Peacock Station Road (east side)	38°58′25″N 77°15′12″W	Fairfax County	Southwest	undated	
Fairview	Old Dominion Drive at Falls Run Road	38°58′40″N 77°15′26″W	Fairfax County	West		
Elkins	Old Dominion Drive at Georgetown Pike (north side)	38°58′54″N 77°15′25″W	Fairfax County	West	undated undated	Named for Stephen Benton Elkins.
Dickeys Road	Old Dominion Drive in Great Falls Park	38°59′36″N 77°15′20″W	Fairfax County (National Park Service)			Named for Dickey's Inn. Near former site of Matildaville.
Great Falls	Old Dominion Drive in Great Falls Park	38°59′48″N 77°15′19″W	Fairfax County (National Park Service)	Inside turnaround	undated postcard undated photo undated colorized photo of dining hall	Terminal station of GF&OD and Great Falls Division of W&OD.

== Maps ==
=== W&OD Railway system maps ===
- "Washington and Old Dominion Railway system map". c. 1920. Archived from the original on January 7, 2011 – via r2parts.net.

=== Topographic Maps ===
- 1915 topographic map of northwestern Fairfax County, showing the route of the W&OD Railway's Great Falls Division (Electric RR) between Difficult Run and Great Falls: Marshall, R. B.; Sutton, Frank (1915). "Topography: Virginia: Fairfax Quadrangle". Washington, D.C.: United States Department of the Interior: United States Geological Survey – via Virginia Historical Topographic Maps, Perry–Castañeda Library Map Collection, Perry–Castañeda Library, University of Texas at Austin, Austin, Texas.
- 1915 topographic map of Washington, D.C., the city of Alexandria, Alexandria County, Falls Church and northeastern Fairfax County, showing the route of the W&OD Railway's Great Falls Division between Georgetown and Great Falls: Marshall, R. B.; Sutton, Frank (1915). "Topography: Maryland — District of Columbia — Virginia, Washington and vicinity". Washington, D.C.: United States Department of the Interior: United States Geological Survey. LCCN 87691472 – via Library of Congress.
- 1917 topographic map of Washington, D.C., the city of Alexandria, Alexandria County, Falls Church and northeastern Fairfax County, showing the route of the W&OD Railway's Great Falls Division between Georgetown and Great Falls: Marshall, R. B.; Sutton, Frank (1917). "Washington and Vicinity: Maryland: District of Columbia: Virginia". Washington, D.C.: United States Department of the Interior: United States Geological Survey. LCCN 87691475. OCLC 15519039 – via Library of Congress.
- 1929 topographic map of Washington, D.C., the city of Alexandria, Alexandria County, Falls Church and northeastern Fairfax County, showing the routes of the W&OD Railway's Great Falls Division between Rosslyn and Great Falls:"Washington and Vicinity: Maryland: District of Columbia: Virginia". Washington, D.C.: United States Department of the Interior: United States Geological Survey. 1929. LCCN 87693006. OCLC 15653164 – via Library of Congress.

== See also ==
- Northern Virginia Trolleys
- Washington and Old Dominion Railroad
