= Oakton Trolley Station =

- U.S. National Register of Historic Places
- Virginia Landmarks Register
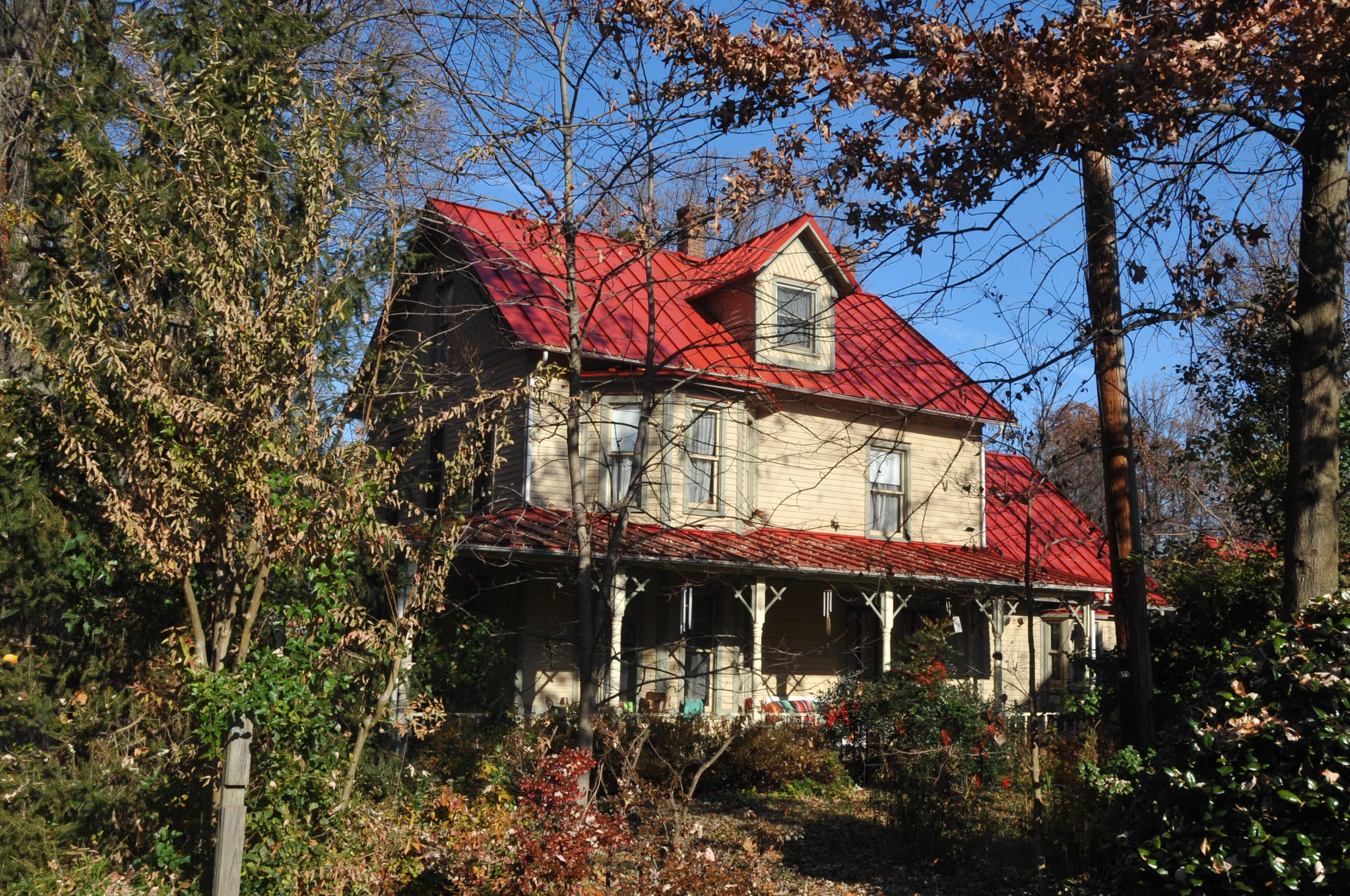
- Oakton Trolley Station, November 2012

- Location within Northern Virginia Location within Virginia Location within the United States
- Location: 2923 Gray St., Oakton, Virginia
- Coordinates: 38°52′47″N 77°17′49″W
- Area: less than one acre
- Built: 1905
- Built by: Washington & Fairfax Electric RR Co.
- Architectural style: Late Victorian
- NRHP reference No.: 95000026
- VLR No.: 029-0477

Significant dates
- Added to NRHP: February 8, 1995
- Designated VLR: October 19, 1994

Oakton Trolley Station is a historic trolley station located at Oakton, Fairfax County, Virginia. The Washington, Arlington & Falls Church Railway, which operated electric trolleys that travelled between Fairfax City and downtown Washington, D.C., from 1904 to 1939, constructed the station in 1905. The building has a three-story vernacular frame. It has a rectangular plan, with a wrap-around open porch, weatherboards and a tin roof.

The trolley line used the building as a station until the line closed in 1939. A post office and a general store then used the building until it became a boarding house. The building was restored in 1988 as a single family dwelling.

On October 19, 1994, the Virginia Department of Historic Resources added the trolley station to the Virginia Landmarks Register. The National Park Service then added the station to the National Register of Historic Places on February 8, 1995. In 2011, the Northern Virginia Conservation Trust entered into an historic preservation agreement that legally protects the historic resource.
