= Ervin Perry =

Ervin Sewell Perry (1935–December 14, 1970) was an American civil engineer who became the first Black faculty member at a predominantly White university in the South when he was appointed in 1964 at the University of Texas at Austin. Perry–Castañeda Library, the main central library of the University of Texas at Austin library system, is named in his honor. Perry received the Young Engineer of the Year award from the National Society of Professional Engineers in 1970.

== Early life and education ==
Perry was born and raised in Coldspring, Texas. He was one of four sons and four daughters born to Willie and Edna Perry.

He graduated from Prairie View A&M College in 1956 and received its Distinguished Graduate Award. He earned his Master of Science degree in 1961 and his Ph.D. degree in 1964, both at the University of Texas.

== Career ==
After graduation, Perry taught at Prairie View A&M and Southern University. In 1964, Perry joined the Civil Engineering Department at the University of Texas. He was promoted to associate professor in 1969.

For the 1967–68 academic year, Perry was selected by the American Council on Education for an academic administration internship at Drexel Institute of Technology.

== Personal life ==
Perry and his wife, Jean, had three daughters. Perry died in Houston on December 14, 1970, of cancer.
