= Perry–Castañeda Library Map Collection =

- 30.282907632805085°N 97.73785385039271°W
- Location: Austin, Texas, United States
- Type: Academic library

Other information
- Affiliation: University of Texas at Austin
- Website: maps.lib.utexas.edu/maps/

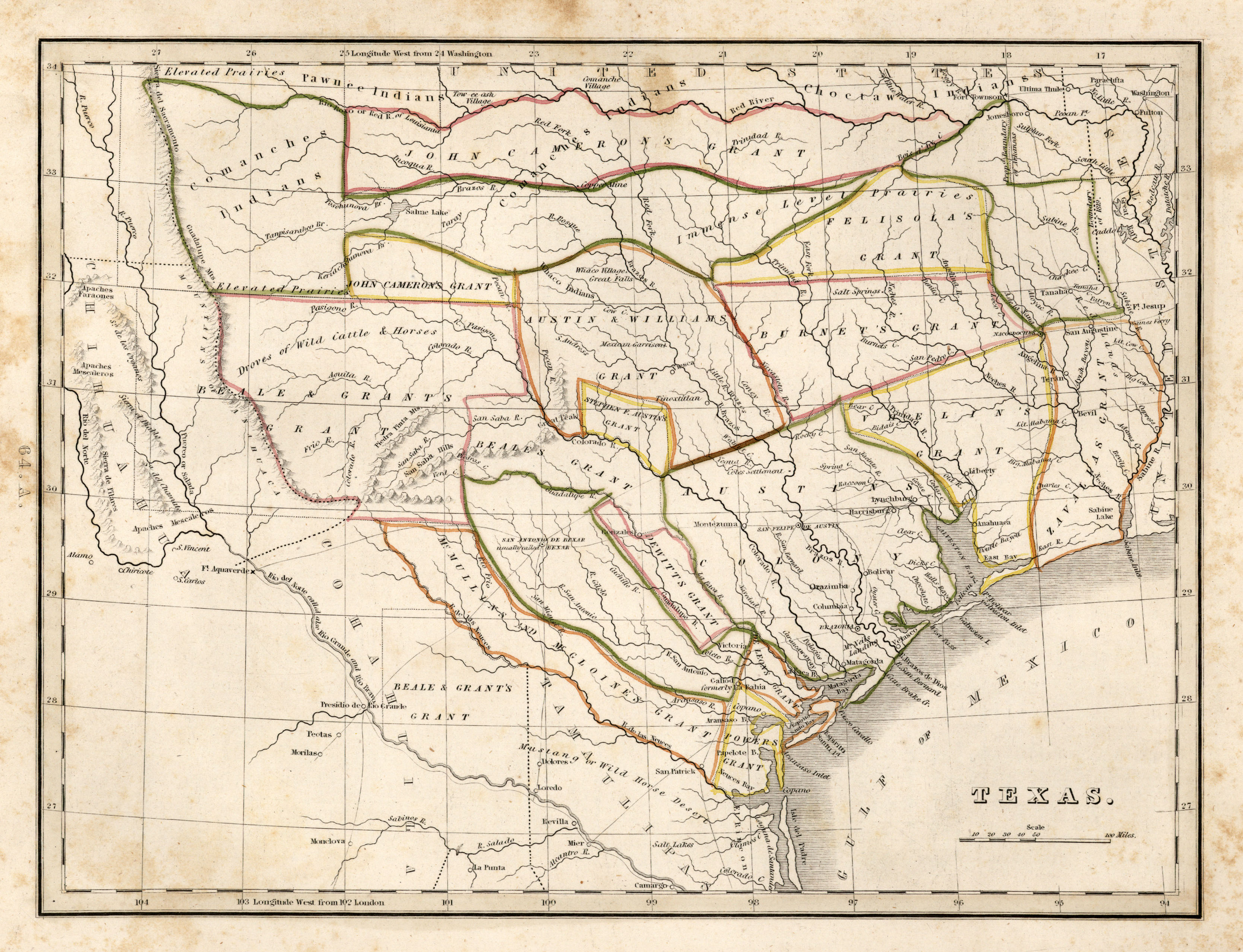
Map of Texas, by Thomas Gamaliel Bradford, 1835, from the Perry–Castañeda Library Map Collection.

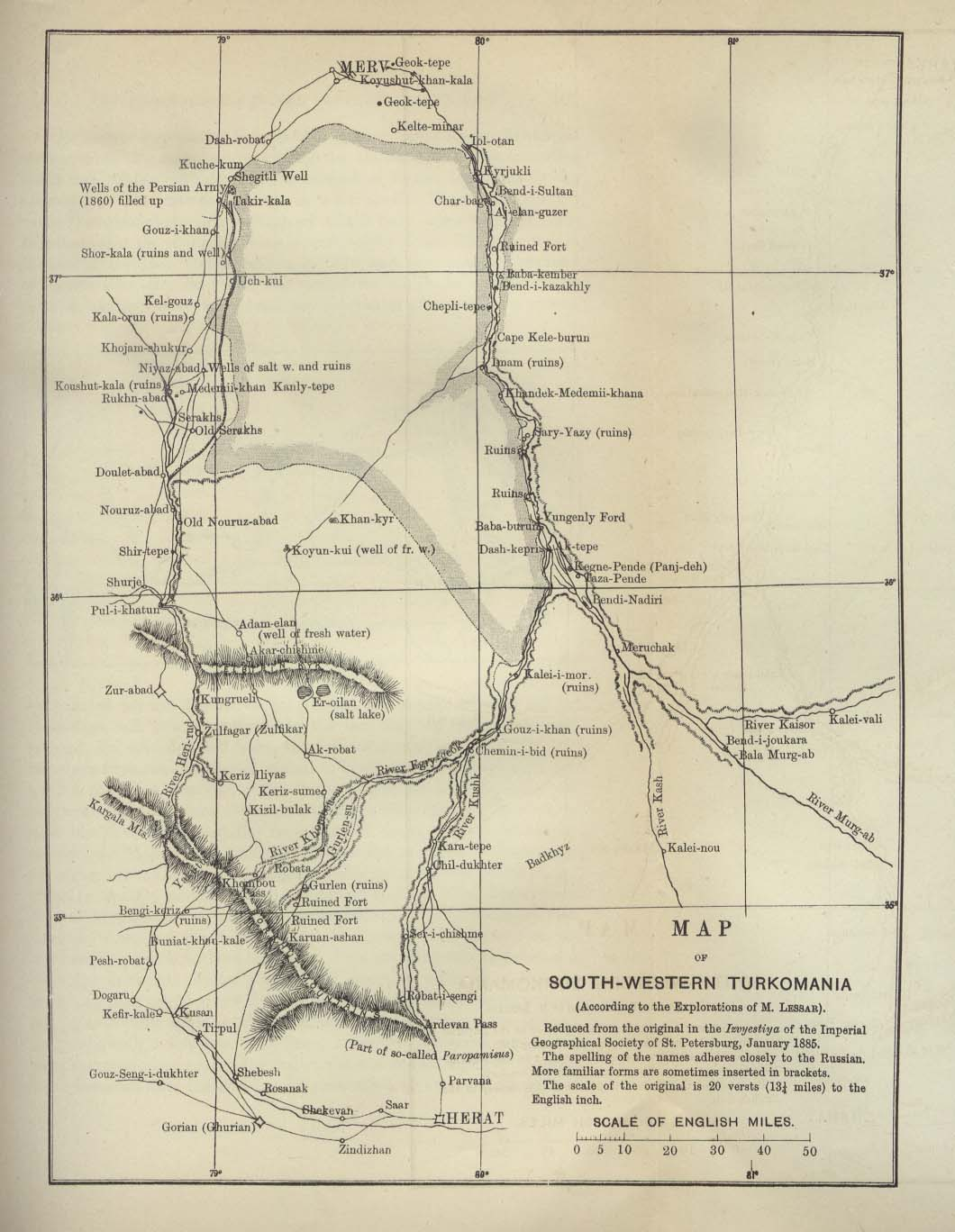
"Map of South Western Turkomania" (now Turkmenistan), 1887, from the Perry–Castañeda Library Map Collection.

The Perry–Castañeda Library Map Collection is an extensive map collection owned by the Perry–Castañeda Library at The University of Texas at Austin.

Many of the maps in the collection have been scanned and are available online, and most of these maps are public domain.

The collection includes maps of special interest:

- Afghanistan
- Avian influenza
- Darfur Conflict
- Iran
- Iraq
- Korea
- Kuwait
- Somalia

General categories include:

- The World
- Africa
- The Americas
- Asia
- Australia and the Pacific
- Europe
- Middle East
- Polar Regions and Oceans
- Russia and the Former Soviet Republics
- United States including national parks and national monuments
- Texas
- Texas Counties
- Austin
