= Perry–Castañeda Library =

Library of the University of Texas at Austin, United States

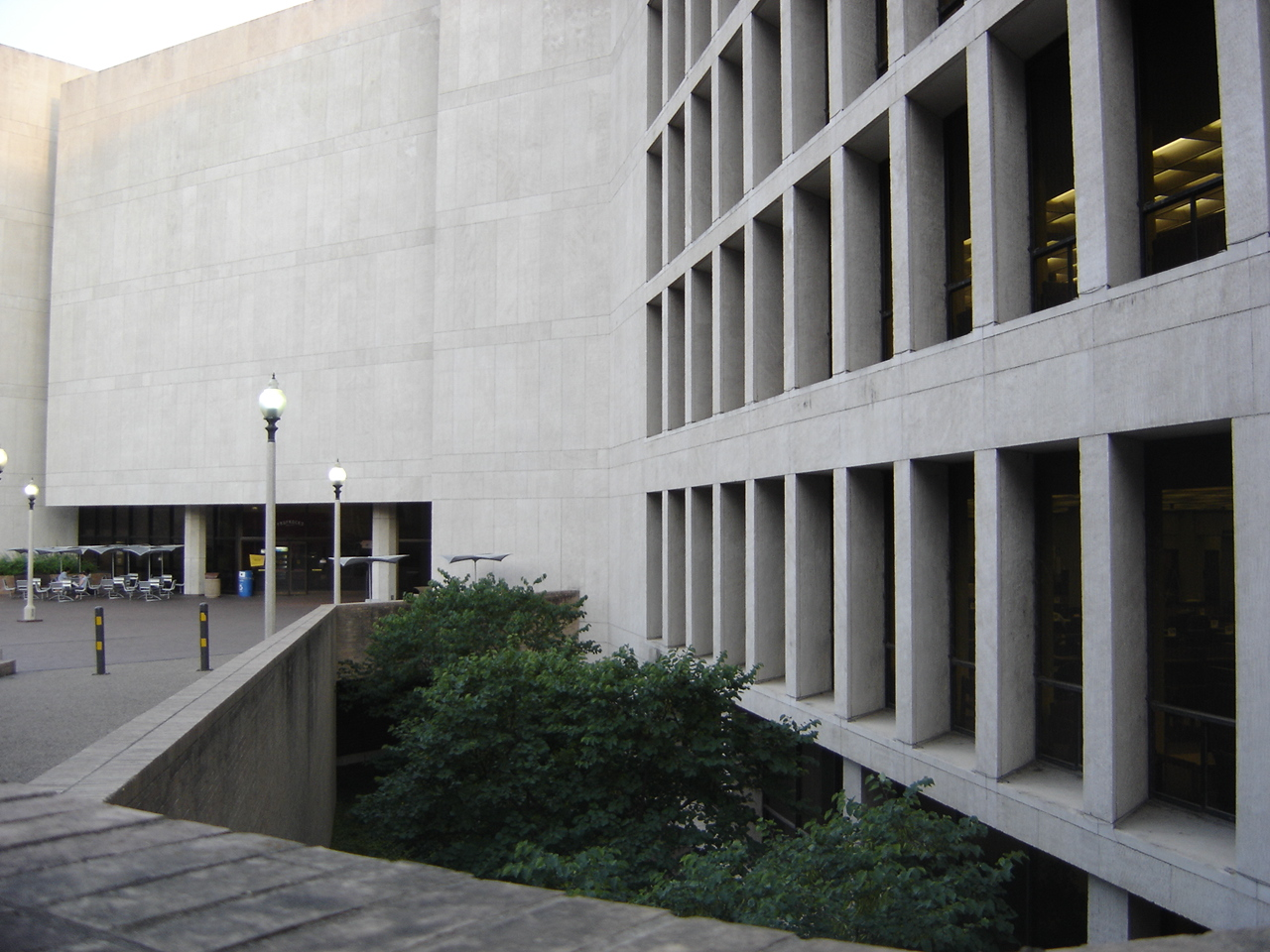
- The Perry–Castañeda Library's front entrance.
- 30.282814984326087°N 97.73729595092315°W
- Location: Austin, Texas, United States
- Type: Academic library
- Established: 1977
- Architect: Bartlett Cocke

Other information
- Affiliation: University of Texas at Austin
- Website: www.lib.utexas.edu/about/locations/pcl

The Perry–Castañeda Library (PCL) is the main central library of the University of Texas at Austin library system in Austin, Texas. PCL is located at 21st Street and Speedway in Austin, TX.

The UT Austin campus library system holds nearly eight million volumes, ranking it as the fifth largest library among academic institutions in the United States, and the eleventh largest overall in the country.

It has long been claimed that the Perry–Castañeda Library was designed to appear, when seen from above, in the shape of Texas. This is officially denied by the university, which stated: "If you look at a campus map the right way and use your imagination, it's possible to think of the outline of the library as similar to the shape of Texas. But this wasn't intentional. Officially it's called a "rhomboid shape", and it complements the similarly designed Graduate School of Business building across the street, which was completed the same year."

The PCL is an example of brutalist architecture and has been recognized as Austin's best example of this architectural style.

== History ==
Planning and funding for the PCL were approved in 1972, a construction contract was awarded in early 1974 to Stokes Construction Company, and the facility was opened to the public in 1977. The Perry–Castañeda Library is named for two former University professors, Ervin S. Perry and Carlos E. Castañeda. Professor Perry was the first African American to be appointed to the academic rank of professor and Professor Castañeda played a central role in the early development of the Benson Latin American Collection.

In January 2007, the University Federal Credit Union (UFCU) donated $500,000 for the renovation of the Perry-Castañeda Library's main floor, marking the library's first significant renovation since 1977. The grant transformed the room into a modern community study area, named the "UFCU Student Learning Commons". Initial designs for the 11,000-square-foot space included improved lighting, adaptable furniture arrangements, new shelving, and technology upgrades.

In August 2015, the University of Texas at Austin opened the doors of a new Learning Commons on the main floor of the library.

In spring 2023, the UT Libraries worked with students in the UT Austin Master of Science in Information Technology and Management to develop interactive 3D models for library spaces. Utilizing open source software like QGIS, the team aimed to enhance the patron experience within the Perry-Castaneda Library (PCL) Map Room.

== Shooting ==
PCL was the site of a shooting on Tuesday, September 28, 2010. Police reports state that student Colton Tooley fired shots on his walk from Guadalupe Street to the library's front entrance. He ascended to the sixth floor where he killed himself in the northeast corner of the topmost floor of the library and thirty feet (9.1 m) from the children's book section. No one else was injured, except for one sprained ankle suffered by a female student fleeing the scene. There were reports of a second gunman and authorities locked down the entire campus for several hours until they were able to determine the reports were false.

== Deaths ==
An unnamed individual died in a secluded portion of the library on Saturday, April 5, 2025. Authorities did not release a name or cause of death. A week later, another body was found in the library.

== See also ==
- Perry–Castañeda Library Map Collection
