= Transportation in Virginia =

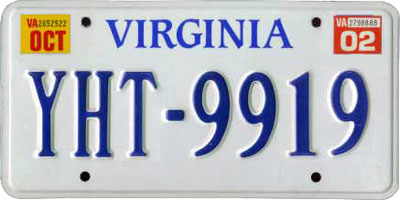
The current Virginia passenger vehicle license plate, introduced in 2002.

Transportation in the Commonwealth of Virginia is by land, sea and air. Virginia's extensive network of highways and railroads were developed and built over a period almost 400 years, beginning almost immediately after the founding of Jamestown in 1607, and often incorporating old established trails of the Native Americans.

== History ==
=== Colonial period, 19th century ===
During the colonial period, the Virginia Colony was dependent upon the waterways as avenues of commerce, and James River Plantations such as John Rolfe's Varina Farms with their own wharfs on the rivers of the Fall Line (at present-day Richmond were soon shipping tobacco and other export crops abroad. Other important navigable rivers in this period were the Elizabeth, York, and Potomac.

By the 19th century, the Virginia Board of Public Works was funding transportation infrastructure improvements, stimulating such private enterprises as the James River and Kanawha Canal, the Chesterfield Railroad, and the Valley Turnpike. Claudius Crozet's innovative tunnels under the Blue Ridge Mountains were a key link in Collis P. Huntington's railroad linking Virginia to the Ohio River Valley in 1873. Soon thereafter, Pocahontas coal was riding the rails from the mountains eastbound for export via the Chesapeake and Ohio, Norfolk and Western and Virginian Railways with coal piers on Hampton Roads.

=== 20th-21st centuries ===
With urging from the state chapter founded in Roanoke in 1894 of the National Good Roads Movement, in 1906 the Virginia General Assembly created the first State Highway Commission. In 1932, the state's role was expanded when the provisions of the Byrd Road Act during the Great Depression brought most secondary roads in the counties into the scope of state control and maintenance.

In the mid-20th century, Virginia's Henry G. Shirley Memorial Highway in Northern Virginia pioneered HOV and reversible traffic lanes. Prior to the creation of the Interstate Highway System, Virginia had some other notable roads to handle heavy traffic including Military Highway in South Hampton Roads, Mercury Boulevard on the Virginia Peninsula, and State Route 168, which extended from west of Williamsburg to the North Carolina border near the eastern edge of the Great Dismal Swamp, including Tidewater Drive in the Norfolk area. The Richmond-Petersburg Turnpike was built to relieve heavy traffic on US1-301 between those two cities.

In 1957, The Hampton Roads Bridge-Tunnel, first of its kind, was completed, and was soon incorporated into Interstate 64. The Chesapeake Bay Bridge-Tunnel completed in 1964 is the longest bridge-tunnel in the world. Interstate highways I-81 and I-95 are some of the busiest roads of commerce on the East Coast.

Of course, people and property continue to travel by ship, as the first settlers did. The Atlantic Ocean is accessed by the more sheltered Chesapeake Bay and Hampton Roads, with 5 major navigable rivers offering a wide choice of ports and industrial sites. International shipping traffic continues to grow as intermodal port and rail facilities are expanded. The Virginia Port Authority even operates an inland port in the Shenandoah Valley.

The Wright Brothers are credited with first flight just south of Virginia at Kitty Hawk, North Carolina. Other early flights took place at Willoughby Spit near Norfolk. In modern times, major commercial airports are located around the state, with many additional general aviation facilities.

For those who wish to live in the past, at least for a visit, the Colonial Parkway, carefully shielded from commercial development, joins Colonial Williamsburg with Yorktown and Jamestown, the three points of the Historic Triangle. By riding the toll free Jamestown Ferry service across the James River, it is even possible to arrive at Jamestown Island by water, with a similar view to that of the first colonists. Virginia's scenic byways include the Skyline Drive in Shenandoah National Park and the Blue Ridge Parkway. Even in busy Northern Virginia, a bucolic interlude is available inside the beltway on the George Washington Memorial Parkway. The state has literally dozens of other stretches of roads designated as scenic byways, and VDOT distributes a free map showing them.

== Highways and bridges ==
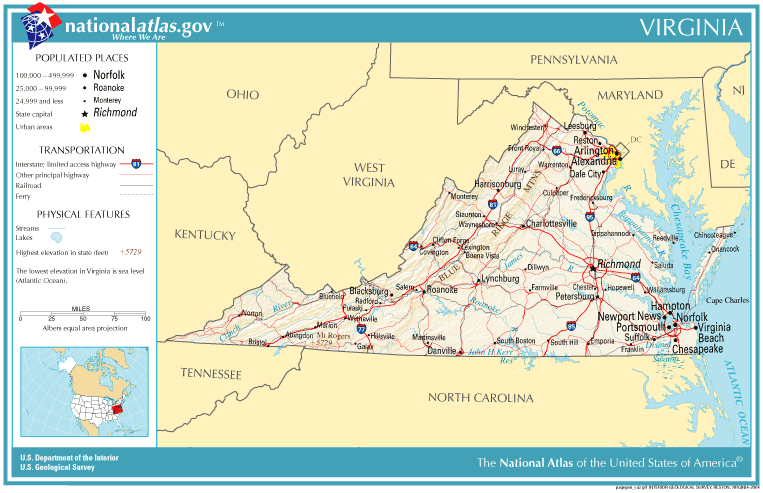
Map of Virginia's major cities and roads

The Virginia State Highway System is an integrated system of roads maintained by the Virginia Department of Transportation (VDOT). As of 2005, the VDOT maintains 57,082 miles (91,865 km) of state highways — the third largest system in the United States, after Texas and North Carolina. Interstate 95 and Interstate 81 are the two major north–south highways through Virginia. The Capital Beltway, Interstate 495 crosses the Potomac River in Alexandria and McLean. The Springfield Interchange at the junction of I-95, I-395, and the Capital Beltway, in Springfield, Virginia, south of Washington, D.C. has been reconstructed to improve traffic flow; widening of Woodrow Wilson Bridge was finished in mid-2008. Interstate 66, another heavily traveled route into Washington, DC, connects the Capital Beltway to I-81 at Front Royal, Virginia. Interstate 64 runs east–west through the state, from the terminus in Virginia's southeast in Chesapeake running northwest into Richmond, then west through Charlottesville and into West Virginia and beyond. Interstate 77 runs north–south through the state running from the North Carolina state line, goes through Wytheville heads through the Big Walker Mountain and then reaches the West Virginia state line.

=== Interstate highways ===
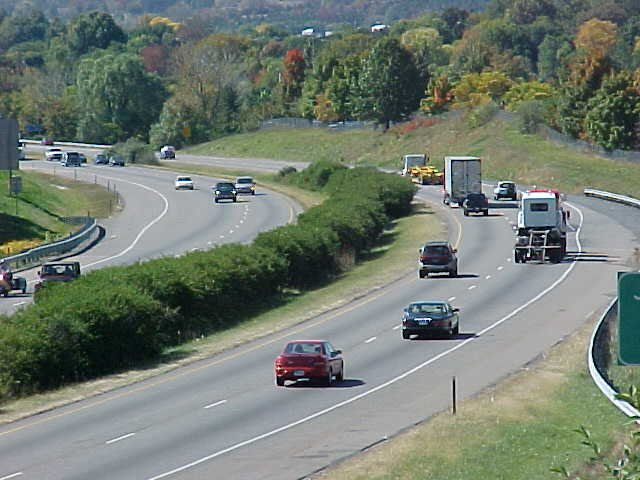
I-81 looking southbound near milepost 245 in Harrisonburg

Virginia has an extensive network of Interstate Highways. The Interstate Highways, totaling 1,118 miles (1,799 km) in Virginia, are freeways designated by the Federal Highway Administration and numbered by the American Association of State Highway and Transportation Officials. They are in a special class with respect to federal funding. These Interstate Highways are as follows:

- Major east–west routes (from south) are:
  - I-74 (planned, not yet built)
  - I-64
  - I-66
- Major north–south routes (from west) are:
  - I-73 (planned, not yet built))
  - I-77
  - I-81
  - I-85
  - I-95

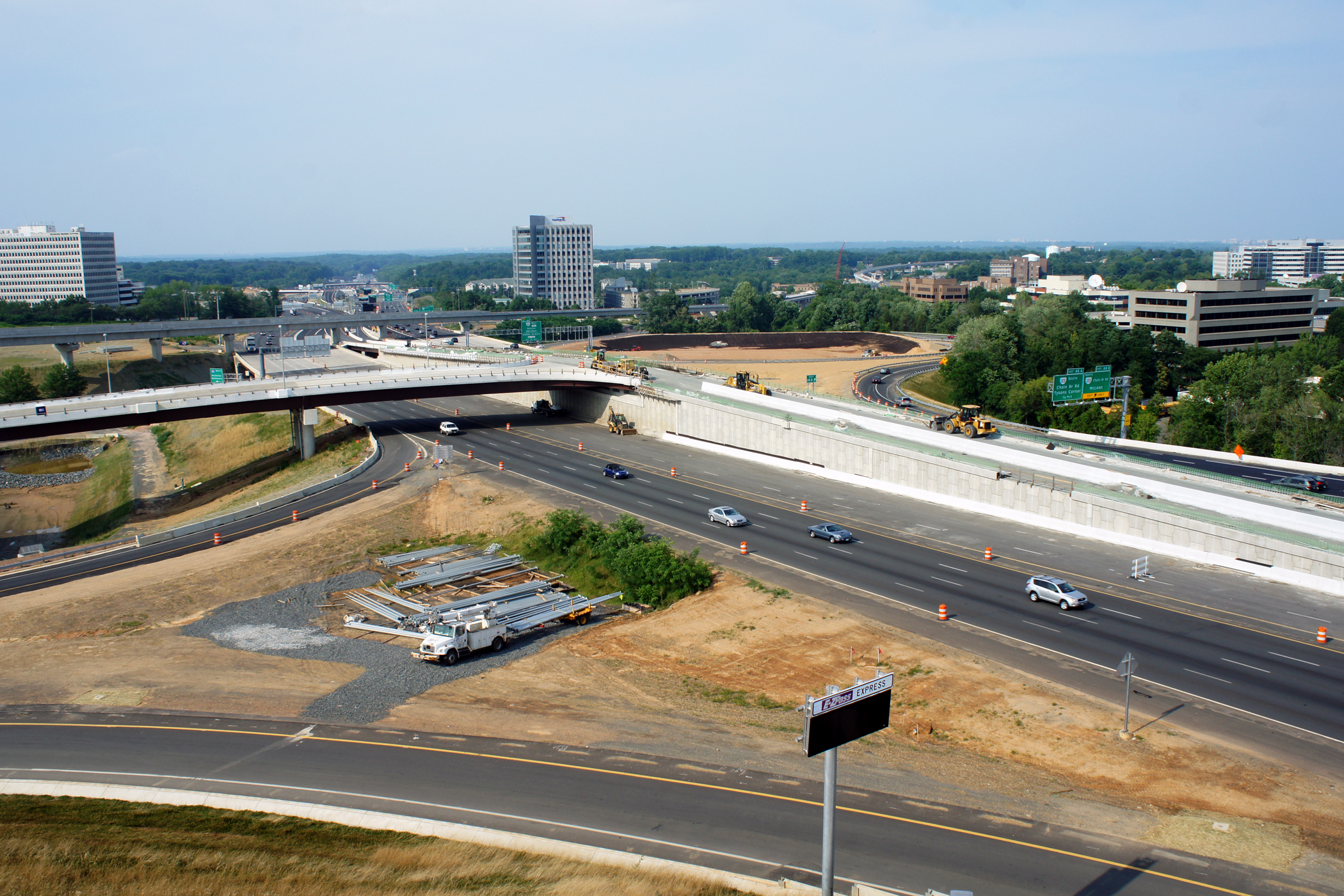
I-495 (Capital Beltway) in Tysons Corner, with HOT lanes under construction

- Three-digit Interstates are:
  - I-264
  - I-195
  - I-295
  - I-395
  - I-464
  - I-495
  - I-564
  - I-581
  - I-664
  - I-785 (partially built, but currently incomplete and not signed)
  - Another planned route, I-895 is currently signed as State Route 895 and operated as toll road under a public-private financing partnership.

=== Primary highways ===
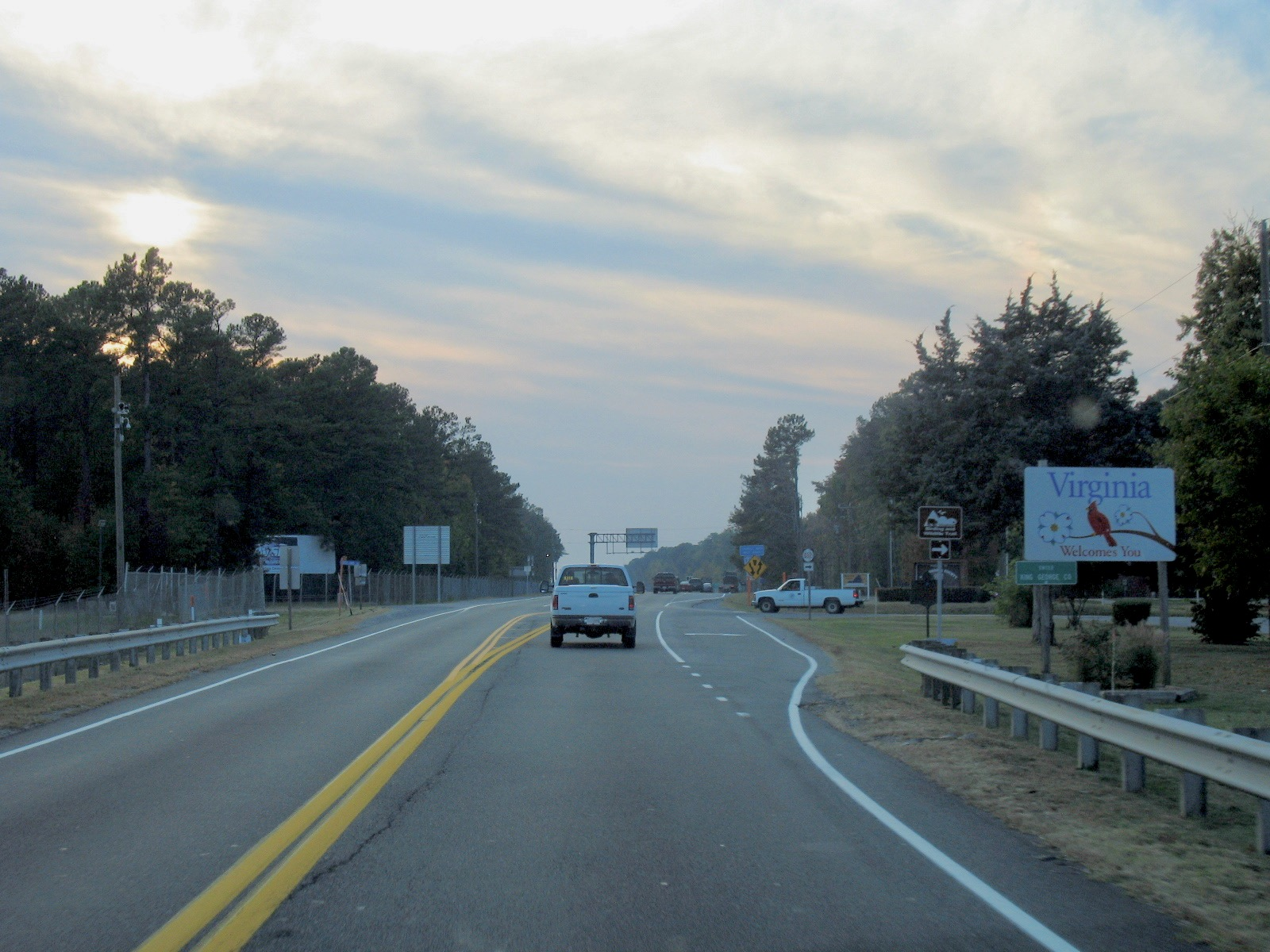
US 301 entering Virginia from Maryland

Primary highways, totaling 8,111 miles (13,053 km), consist of U.S. Routes, designated and numbered by the American Association of State Highway and Transportation Officials, and primary State Routes, designated and numbered by VDOT. Alternate, business, and bypass special routes, as well as wye connections (with a "Y" suffix appended to the number), are all considered primary routes.

Primary routes are generally given numbers under 600. The two exceptions - State Route 785 and State Route 895 - are numbered as Interstate Highway spurs.

Major U.S. highways in Virginia include:

- US-1
- US-11
- US-13
- US-15
- US-17
- US-19
- US-21
- US-23
- US-29
- US-33
- US-48
- US-50
- US-52
- US-58
- US-60
- US-211
- US-219
- US-220
- US-221
- US-250
- US-258
- US-301
- US-340
- US-360
- US-421
- US-460
- US-501
- US-522

=== Secondary highways ===
Virginia has 48,305 miles (77,739 km) of secondary routes. These roads, numbered 600 and up, receive less funding than primary routes. Numbers are only unique within each county, though routes that cross county lines generally keep their numbers.

Under the provisions of the Byrd Road Act of 1932, the secondary roads in most of Virginia's counties are maintained by the Virginia Department of Transportation, an arrangement that a 1998 study found " unusual among the 50 states." (The study also identified such issues as drainage, speed limits, and planning and coordination of roads with development as those local leaders felt should be within their control).

The streets and roads in two counties, Arlington and Henrico, as well as some of the incorporated towns, and all of the independent cities are maintained by the various localities. In the early 21st century, the Virginia General Assembly was considering legislation to allow some additional counties (most likely those in fast-growing areas) to choose to resume control and care for the secondary highways within their boundaries.

=== National parkways ===
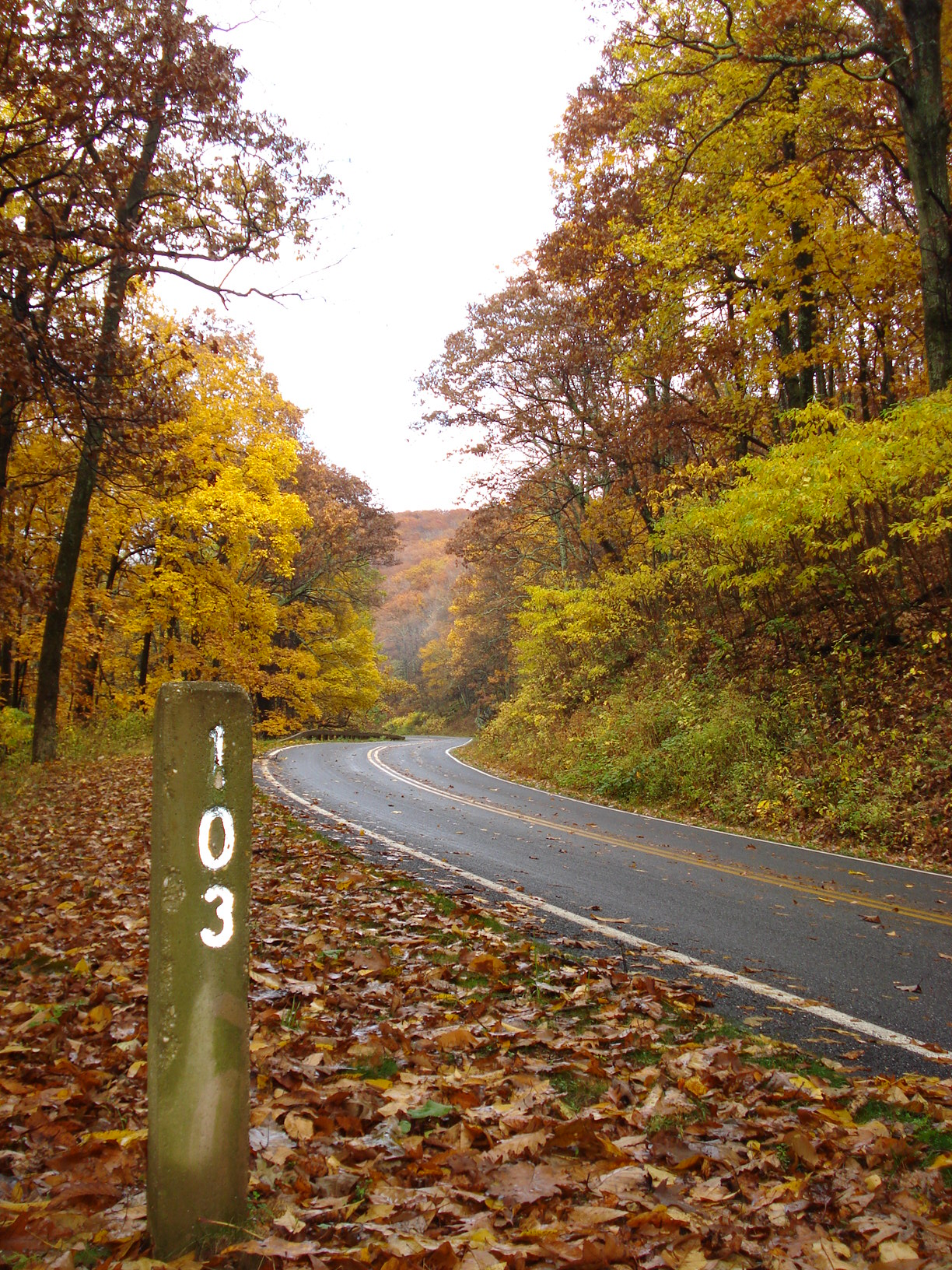
Skyline Drive

Several national parkways are located in Virginia. These include:

- Blue Ridge Parkway
- Colonial Parkway
- George Washington Memorial Parkway
- Skyline Drive

=== Beltways and bypasses ===
==== Northern Virginia ====
The Capital Beltway circles Washington D.C. through Northern Virginia, Maryland, and a tiny edge of the District of Columbia. The road is signed with Inner Loop and Outer Loop designations.

==== Hampton Roads ====
The Hampton Roads Beltway extends 56 miles (90 km) on a long loop through the region, crossing the harbor on two toll-free bridge-tunnel facilities. These crossings are the Hampton Roads Bridge–Tunnel between Phoebus in Hampton and Willoughby Spit in Norfolk and the Monitor–Merrimac Memorial Bridge–Tunnel between Newport News and Suffolk. The Beltway connects with another Interstate highway and three arterial U.S. Highways at Bower's Hill near the northeastern edge of the Great Dismal Swamp. The road is signed with Inner Loop and Outer Loop designations.

Also in Hampton Roads, the Williamsburg area has State Route 199, a semi-circular limited access roadway also named the Humelsine Parkway, which is sometimes locally referred to as the "Williamsburg Beltway."

==== Richmond ====
The Richmond area does not officially have a beltway. However, it has two roads that effectively form portions of a beltway, though they do not completely encircle Richmond. These are Interstate 295 in the northwest, northern, and eastern portions, and State Route 288 in the southwest and western areas.

==== Staunton ====
Staunton, Virginia's Staunton Beltway is a freeway-style 5-10 mile beltway highway making a complete circle around the city, except for about 5 miles (8.0 km) where it merges on with Interstate 81. The road is currently a 2 lane road, except for some areas to the far east and far west. In the future, the road will be expanded into a full 4 lane road.

==== Bypasses ====
Many urban areas in Virginia have roads that bypass the central portions. In some cases, semi-circumferential roadways exist, such as State Route 37 in the Winchester area, and State Route 199 in the Williamsburg and Historic Triangle area.

=== River and waterway crossings ===
==== Major bridges, tunnels, and bridge-tunnels ====
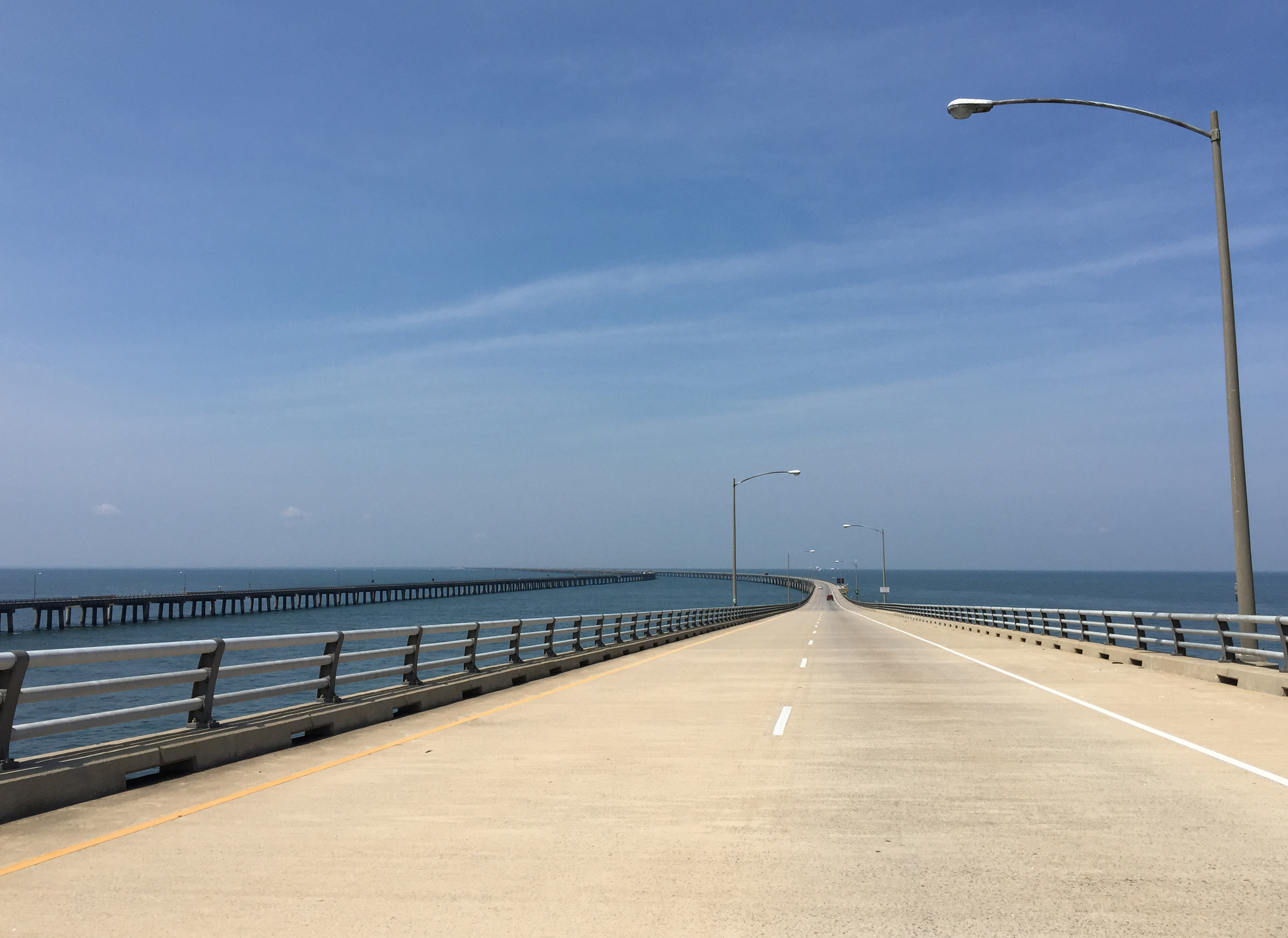
Chesapeake Bay Bridge-Tunnel

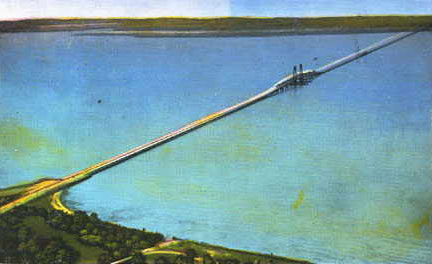
James River Bridge, near Hampton Roads in Virginia. When completed in 1928, it was the longest bridge in the world over water.

In the Hampton Roads area, there are three bridge-tunnel complexes known as the Hampton Roads Bridge–Tunnel, the Monitor–Merrimac Memorial Bridge–Tunnel, and the Chesapeake Bay Bridge–Tunnel. The Chesapeake Bay Bridge–Tunnel in particular is a toll facility that links the region with Virginia's Eastern Shore, which carries US 13. Completed in 1964, at over 17 miles (27 km), it is the longest bridge-tunnel in the world. Two tunnels and numerous bridges span portions of the Elizabeth River. The James River Bridge, opened in 1928, and rebuilt in the 1970s, spans the James River near its mouth and north of the Monitor–Merrimac Memorial Bridge–Tunnel.

Virginia has many crossings of its rivers and waterways. Listed alphabetically, some of the larger named crossings include:

- 14th Street Bridge (I-395) (across Potomac River)
- American Legion Memorial Bridge on I-495 across Potomac River
- Arland D. Williams Jr. Memorial Bridge (part of the 14th St bridge complex, across Potomac River)
- Berkley Bridge on I-264 at Elizabeth River, Norfolk
- Boulevard Bridge in Richmond
- Downtown Tunnel joining Portsmouth and Norfolk
- Edward E. Willey Bridge (across James River)
- George P. Coleman Memorial Bridge (across York River)
- Governor Harry W. Nice Memorial Bridge (mostly in Maryland)
- Hampton Roads Bridge–Tunnel (across mouth of Hampton Roads joining cities of Hampton and Norfolk)
- James River Bridge (across James River)
- Martin Luther King Jr. Memorial Bridge joining cities of Petersburg and Colonial Heights
- Midtown Tunnel (joining Portsmouth and Norfolk)
- Monitor–Merrimac Memorial Bridge–Tunnel (across Hampton Roads between cities of Newport News and Suffolk)
- Pocahontas Parkway Bridge (across James River)
- Powhite Parkway Bridge (across James River)
- Robert E. Lee Memorial Bridge (across James River)
- Theodore Roosevelt Bridge (mostly in DC) (across Potomac River)
- Varina-Enon Bridge (across James River)
- Woodrow Wilson Bridge (mostly in DC and Maryland)
- Wilson Creek Bridge (a.k.a. The Smart Road Bridge)
- World War II Veterans Memorial Bridge (across James River)

==== Ferry systems ====
===== Motor vehicle services =====
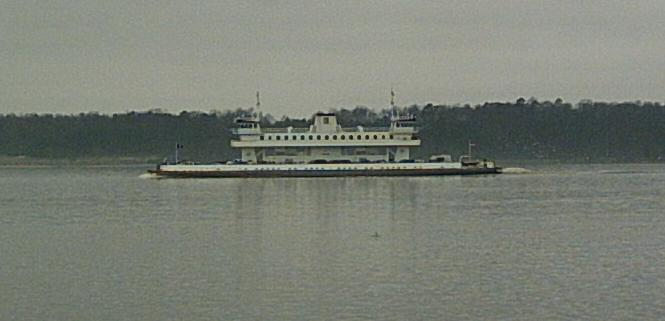
Jamestown Ferry

The Jamestown Ferry (also known as the Jamestown-Scotland Ferry) is an automobile ferry system on the James River connecting Jamestown in James City County with Scotland in Surry County. It carries State Route 31. Operated by VDOT, it is the only 24-hour state-run ferry operation in Virginia and has over 90 employees. It operates four ferryboats, the Pocahontas, the Williamsburg, the Surry, and the Virginia. The facility is toll-free.

The VDOT operates other toll-free cable-guided ferries: the Merry Point ferry, which crosses the western end of the Corrotoman River in Lancaster County; the Sunnybank Ferry, crossing the Little Wicomico River in Northumberland County; and the Hatton Ferry, one of the last two poled ferries in the United States.

===== Pedestrian ferry services =====
Additionally, Hampton Roads Transit's Paddlewheel Ferry on the Elizabeth River operates service (no motor vehicles) between Portsmouth and Norfolk and boasts the world's first natural gas-powered pedestrian ferry.

== Commuter bus service ==
Northern Virginia has several commuter bus operations. They include

- Fairfax Connector
- Loudoun County Commuter Bus
- QUICKS
- MARTZ
- OmniRide
- Shenandoah Valley Commuter Bus

== Local public transportation ==
=== Transit bus and paratransit systems ===
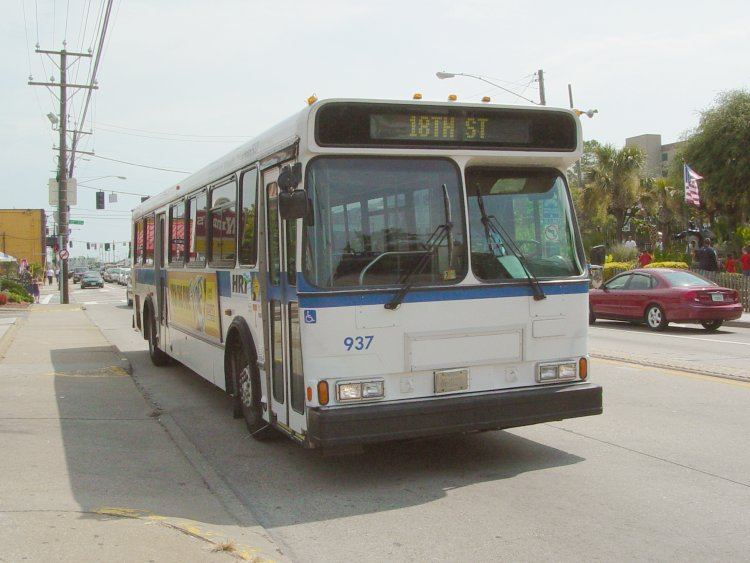
A Hampton Roads Transit bus travels northbound on Pacific Avenue in Virginia Beach.

Virginia has a number of publicly funded providers of transit bus and paratransit services. They include:

- Arlington Transit (ART)
- Bay Transit (Urbanna)
- Blacksburg Transit
- Bristol Transit
- Brite Bus (Augusta County)
- Charlottesville Area Transit
- Colonial Beach Transit
- Danville Transit
- DASH (Alexandria)
- Farmville Area Bus
- Fairfax City-University-Energysaver (CUE)
- Fairfax Connector
- Fredericksburg Regional Transit (FRED)
- Greater Lynchburg Transit Company
- Greater Richmond Transit Company (GRTC)
- Hampton Roads Transit
- Harrisonburg Transit
- JAUNT (Charlottesville)
- Loudoun County Transit
- PRTC OmniRide (Northern Virginia)
- Petersburg Area Transit
- STAR Transit (Eastern Shore)
- Suffolk Transit
- Valley Metro (Roanoke)
- Virginia Regional Transit (Culpeper, Warrenton, Front Royal)
- Williamsburg Area Transit Authority (Historic Triangle)
- WinTran (Winchester)
- WMATA (DC Metro area)

=== Subway systems ===
Subway service is available to residents of northern Virginia. The Washington Metro connects suburban communities to Washington, D.C., Dulles International Airport, and National Airport. Four lines operate in Virginia: the Silver Line, the Orange Line, the Blue Line, and the Yellow Line.

=== Light rail and streetcar projects ===
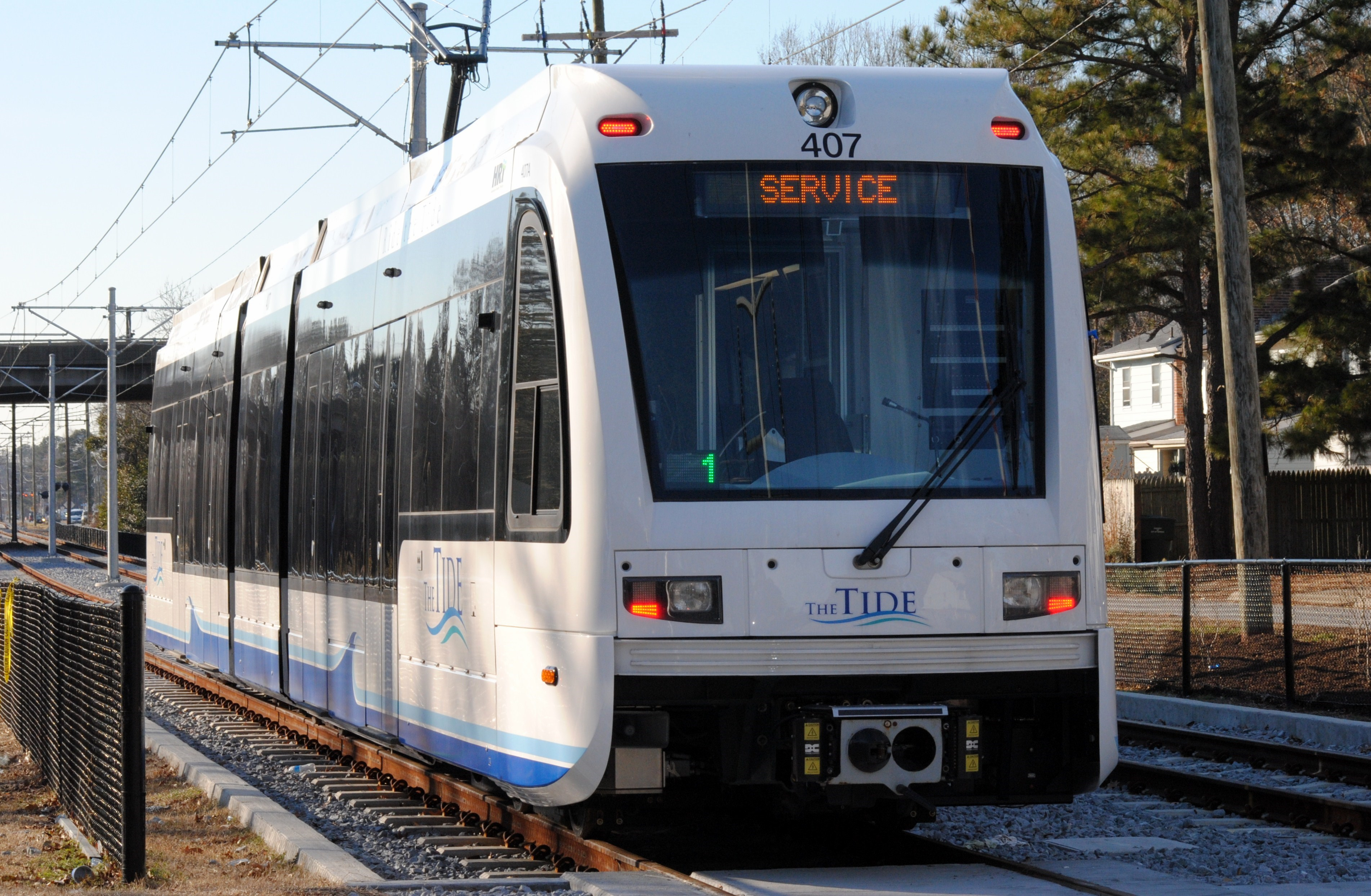
The Tide light rail

Light rail service, called The Tide, started full service in Norfolk on August 19, 2011. A future extension to the Virginia Beach oceanfront was under consideration until it was voted down in a 2016 city referendum.

A study undertaken in 2010 examined the possibility of a rapid transit line along Broad Street in Richmond, for which light rail was considered. Instead, a Bus Rapid Transit option was chosen for its lower capital costs, and the GRTC Pulse BRT line opened in 2018.

== Intercity bus services ==
Intercity bus service is provided by Greyhound Lines, Megabus, OurBus, and a few Chinatown bus lines. In 2017 the Virginia Department of Rail and Public Transportation started the Virginia Breeze, contracted to Megabus, and it now has three routes, from the North Carolina border to Washington, DC.

== Railroads ==
=== Passenger rail ===
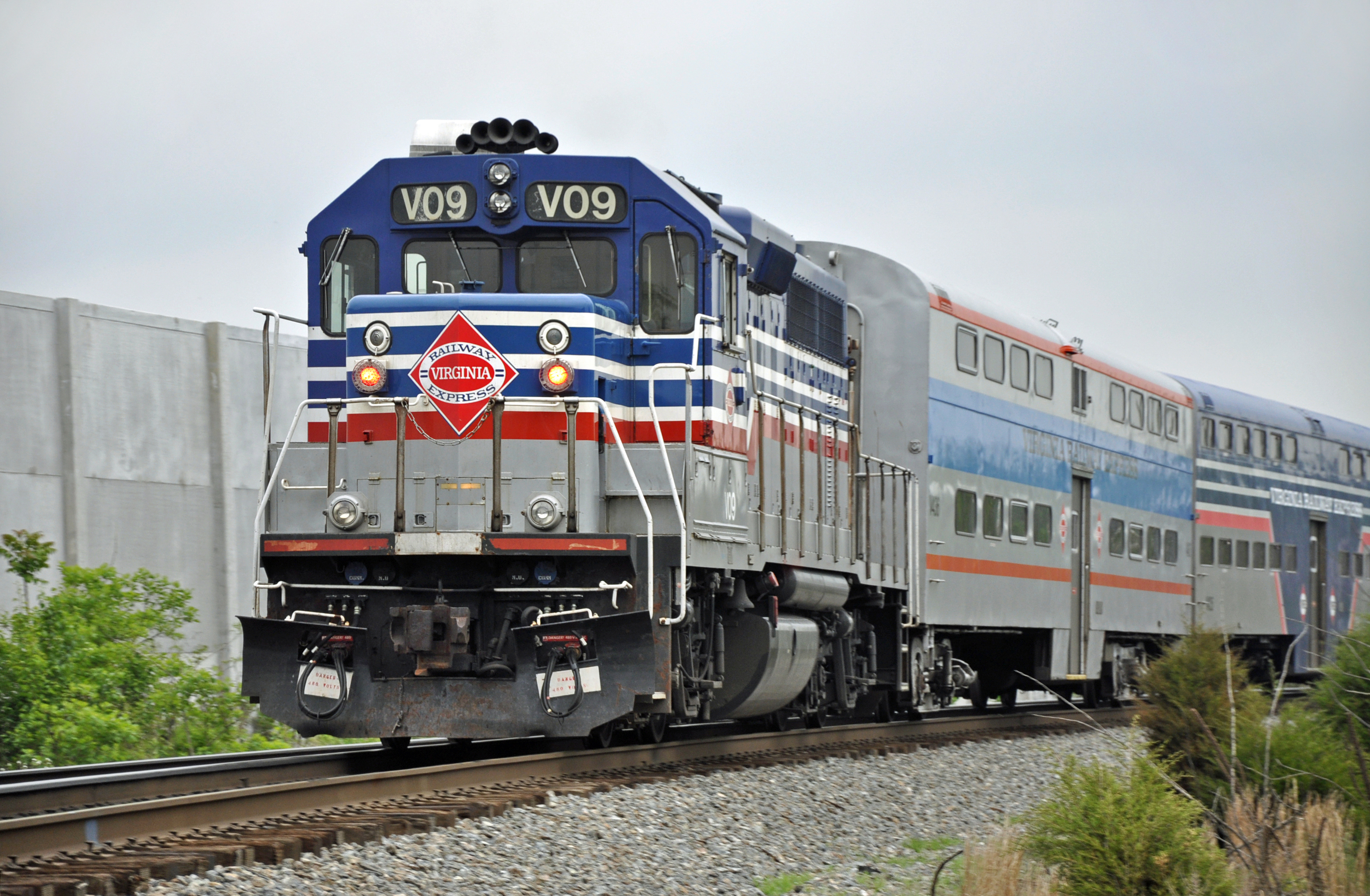
Virginia Railway Express commuter train

Virginia is served by passenger rail service provided by Amtrak and Virginia Railway Express commuter rail. The Virginia Department of Rail and Public Transportation (DRPT) has projects underway for establishing high speed passenger rail service from Washington, D.C., to Hampton Roads and Raleigh, North Carolina, as part of the Southeast High Speed Rail Corridor (SEHSR). In addition, Virginia expands Amtrak service through grants to freight railroads to upgrade track, in exchange for more passenger carriage, and it purchases under-used or abandoned right-of-way from the railroads (rail-banking). North Carolina also does this, as well as supporting Amtrak lines directly and owning a railroad, and is in a rail compact with Virginia. Ridership levels tend to bear out the investment, which is incremental and focused on areas with high demand. The Amtrak Northeast Regional has been enhanced to Newport News and extended to a new Norfolk station. Another new station opened in Roanoke, and the Lynchburg station was rehabilitated to serve both the Crescent and the Northeast Regional. The busiest stations are in Richmond, Northern Virginia and Charlottesville. Lorton, Virginia, is the northern terminus for Amtrak's non-stop Auto Train, which allows passengers to take a motor vehicle on an overnight trip between there and Sanford, Florida, just outside of Orlando. The thrice-weekly Cardinal runs through Piedmont and Western Virginia to Chicago.

A Transdominion Express was proposed in the early 2000s to serve Southside Virginia.

=== Freight railroads ===
Virginia is served by major Class I railroads Norfolk Southern and CSX. There are many short line railroads, including the Buckingham Branch Railroad, the state's largest. Norfolk Southern, a Fortune 500 company, has its headquarters in Norfolk.

== Ports ==
=== Air and Space ===
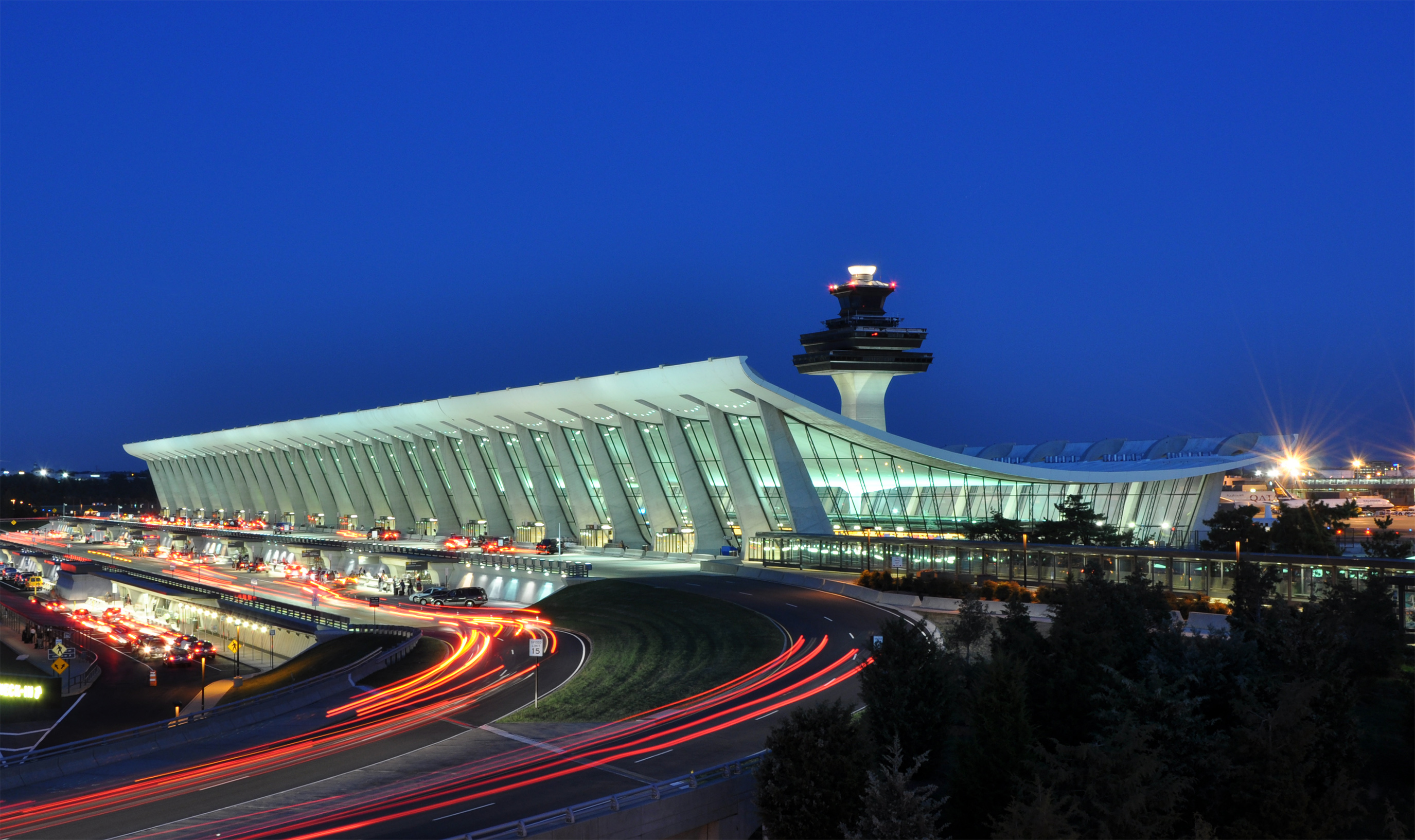
Washington Dulles International Airport

Virginia is served by a number of major commercial airports.

Top Virginia airports by total passengers boarded

Airport	Metropolitan area	City	IATA airport code	CY 2008 Boarding	National rank
Dulles International Airport	Washington, DC	Dulles	IAD	11,348,775	21
Ronald Reagan Washington National Airport	Washington, DC	Arlington	DCA	8,704,466	28
Norfolk International Airport	Hampton Roads	Norfolk	ORF	1,786,594	69
Richmond International Airport	Richmond	Richmond	RIC	1,733,668	70
Newport News/Williamsburg International Airport	Hampton Roads	Newport News	PHF	504,292	116

Other important airports include:

- Charlottesville-Albemarle Airport
- Lynchburg Regional Airport
- Roanoke Regional Airport
- Shenandoah Valley Regional Airport
- Stafford Regional Airport

The state is also home to two spaceports:

- NASA Wallops Flight Facility
- Mid-Atlantic Regional Spaceport (MARS)

=== Nautical ===
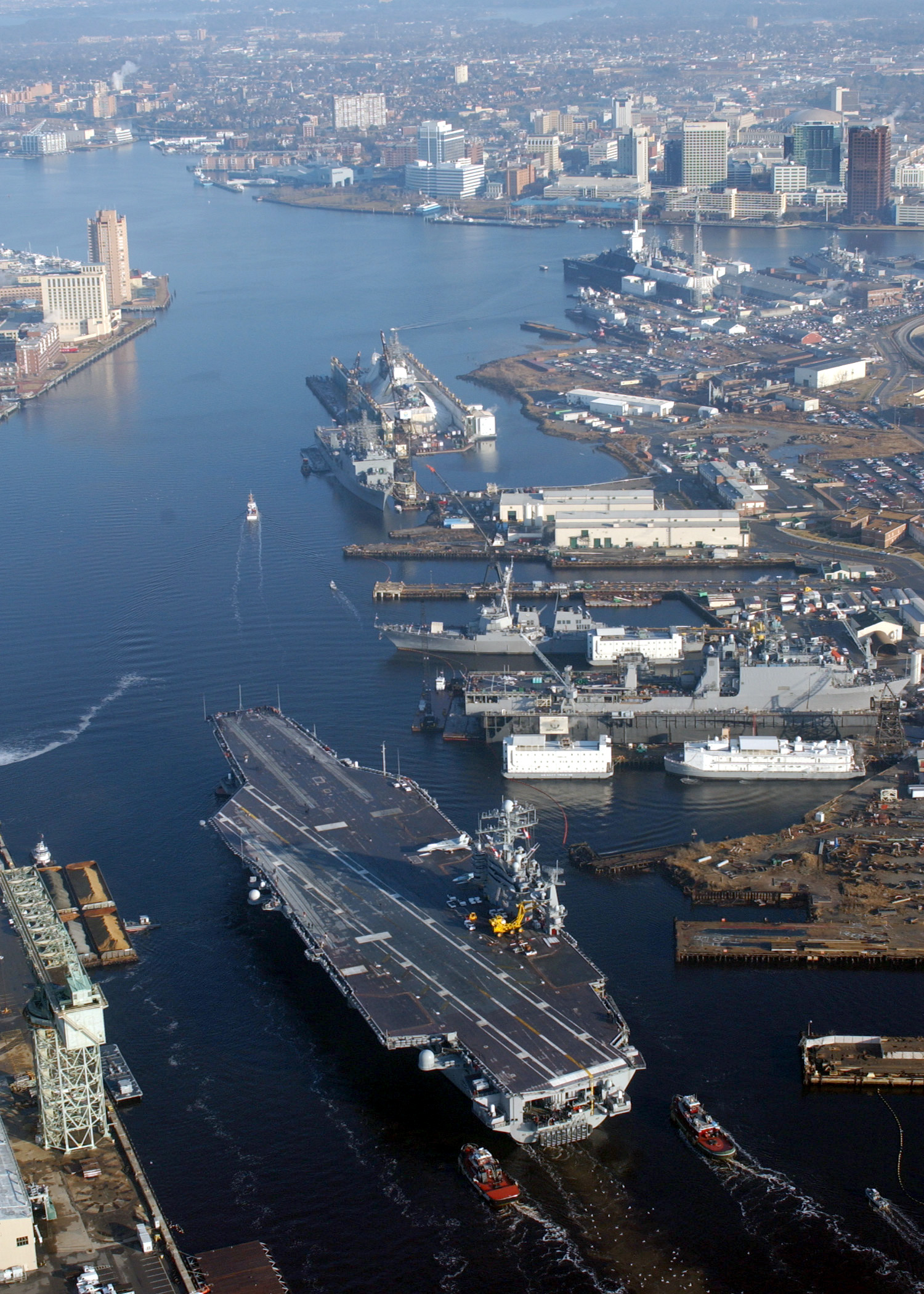
Elizabeth River in Norfolk

Hampton Roads has become known as the "world's greatest natural harbor". The port is located only 18 miles (29 km) from open ocean on one of the world's deepest, natural ice-free harbors. Since 1989, Hampton Roads has been the mid-Atlantic leader in U.S. waterborne foreign commerce and is ranked second nationally behind the Port of South Louisiana based on export tonnage. When import and export tonnage are combined, the Port of Hampton Roads ranks as the third largest port in the country (following the ports of New Orleans/South Louisiana and Houston. In 1996, Hampton Roads was ranked ninth among major U.S. ports in vessel port calls with approximately 2,700. In addition, this port is the U.S. leader in coal exports. The coal loading facilities in the Port of Hampton Roads are able to load in excess of 65 million tons annually, giving the port the largest, most efficient and modern coal loading facilities in the world.

The Hampton Roads region's economic base is largely port-related, including shipbuilding, ship repair, naval installations, cargo transfer and storage, and manufacturing related to the processing of imports and exports. Associated with the ports' military role are almost 50,000 federal civilian employees.

The harbor of Hampton Roads is an important highway of commerce, especially for the cities of Norfolk, Portsmouth, and Newport News. In Portsmouth, a few miles up the Elizabeth River, Norfolk Naval Shipyard is located Newport News Shipbuilding & Dry Dock Company is located a short distance up the James River. There are also several smaller shipyards, numerous docks and terminals. Massive coal loading piers and facilities were established in the late 19th and early 20th centuries by the Chesapeake and Ohio Railway (C&O), Norfolk and Western Railway (N&W), and Virginian Railway (VGN). The latter two were predecessors of the Norfolk Southern Railway, a Class I railroad headquartered in Norfolk that exports coal from a large facility at Lambert's Point on the Elizabeth River. CSX Transportation now serves the former C&O facility at Newport News.

Virginia has extensive waterways. In addition to the lower portion of the Chesapeake Bay and the harbor of Hampton Roads, navigable rivers include:

- Elizabeth River
- James River
- York River
- Rappahannock River
- Potomac River

The Atlantic Intracoastal Waterway passes through eastern Virginia.

The state operates an inland port facility near Front Royal.

== See also ==
- Environment of Virginia
- Southeast High Speed Rail Corridor
- Hatton Ferry
- Plug-in electric vehicles in Virginia
