= Metro West =

Metro West or MetroWest may refer to:

- MetroWest, a region containing the western suburbs of Boston
- MetroWest (Virginia), a development under construction in Fairfax County, Virginia
- Metro West Conference, a high school athletic conference in Minnesota
- Metro West, a proposed line of the planned Dublin Metro
- MetroWest (Orlando), Florida, a planned community
- MetroWest (Bristol), England, a proposed rail network
- Sydney Metro West, a metro line under construction in Sydney, Australia
- Metro West, an arena in Ra'anana, Israel; home to Maccabi Ra'anana basketball club
