= D.C.–Dulles Line =

Bus route in Virginia and Washington, D.C.

5A
- D.C.–Dulles Line

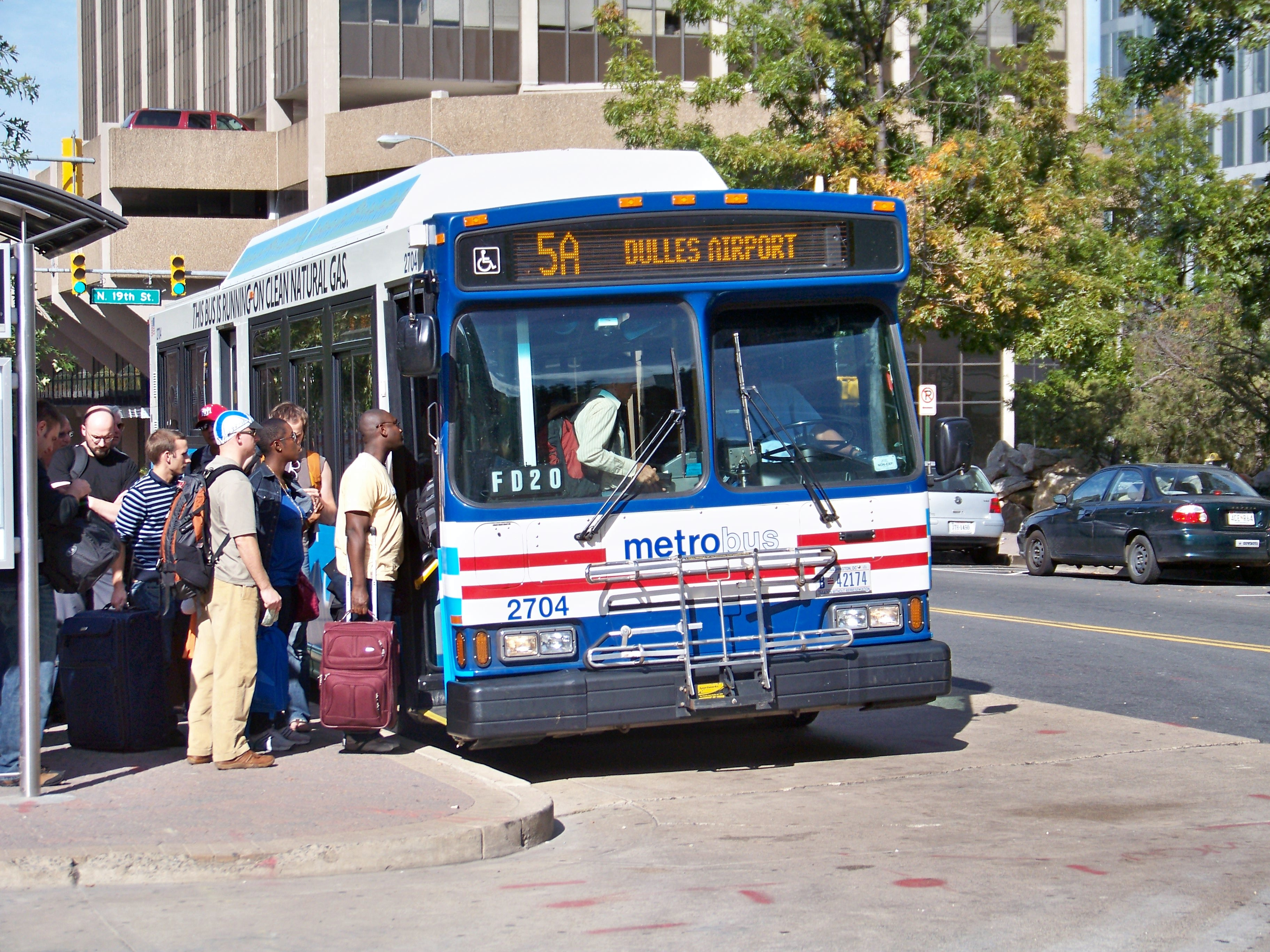
- Route 5A at Rosslyn station in 2012

Overview
- System: Metrobus
- Operator: Washington Metropolitan Area Transit Authority
- Garage: Four Mile Run
- Status: Replaced by Silver Line Phase 2
- Began service: December 4, 2000
- Ended service: November 16, 2022

Route
- Locale: Loudoun County; Fairfax County; Arlington County; Southwest (Washington, D.C.)
- Communities served: Dulles; Herndon; Rosslyn; Southwest (Washington, D.C.)
- Landmarks served: Washington Dulles International Airport; Herndon station Herndon-Monroe Park & Ride; Rosslyn station L'Enfant Plaza station
- Start: L'Enfant Plaza station
- Via: Dulles Toll Road; Custis Memorial Parkway (I-66); Richmond Highway; Interstate 395
- End: Washington Dulles International Airport

Service
- Level: Daily
- Frequency: 30-40 minutes (weekdays); 60 minutes (weekends)
- Operates: 4:50 AM – 12:17 AM (weekdays); 5:30 AM – 12:18 AM (Saturdays); 5:30 AM – 12:10 AM (Sundays)
- Transfers: SmarTrip only
- Timetable: D.C.–Dulles Line

The D.C.–Dulles Line, designated Route 5A, was a bus route operated by the Washington Metropolitan Area Transit Authority (WMATA) between Washington Dulles International Airport and L'Enfant Plaza station of the Blue, Yellow, Orange, Green and Silver lines of the Washington Metro. The line operated every 30–40 minutes on weekdays and 60 minutes on weekends along the Dulles Toll Road, Interstate 66, Richmond Highway and Interstate 395 between these two locations with no intermediate stops, with the exception of the Herndon–Monroe Park & Ride and Rosslyn station. The trip was approximately 50 minutes long.

== Service ==
Service operated every 30 to 35 minutes between L'Enfant Plaza station and Washington Dulles International Airport on weekdays, and 60 minutes on weekends. WMATA used 2006 Orion VII CNG (07.501) suburbans numbered 2701–2730 based out of Four Mile Run Division to operate the route. However, other buses can be used on the route if the Orion VII CNGs are running on other routes or going under maintenance. Each bus has suburban seating with overhead luggage racks. After the Orion VII CNG retirements, the route used 2016-2020 New Flyer XN40 buses.

=== Stops ===
Bus stop	Direction	Connections
L'Enfant Plaza
Washington, D.C.
L'Enfant Plaza station D Street SW / 7th Street	Eastbound Terminal, Westbound station	Metrobus: 33, 52, 70, 74, A9, P6, S2, V1; DC Circulator: Eastern Market–L'Enfant Plaza; MTA Maryland Commuter Bus; Loudoun County Transit; OmniRide Commuter; Ride Smart Northern Shenandoah Valley; Washington Metro:
D Street SW / 9th Street SW	Eastbound	Metrobus: V1
E Street SW / 7th Street SW	Westbound	Metrobus: 74, V1
Interstate 395
Richmond Highway
Arlington County, Virginia
Rosslyn station Bus Bay B	Bidirectional	Arlington Transit: 45, 55, 61; Metrobus: 4A, 4B, 38B; DC Circulator: Rosslyn – Georgetown – Dupont; Loudoun County Transit; Georgetown University Shuttle; Ride Smart Northern Shenandoah Valley; Washington Metro:
Interstate 66
Dulles Toll Road
Reston, Virginia
Herndon–Monroe Park and Ride Bus Bay T	Bidirectional	Fairfax Connector: 551, 924, 926, 927, 929, 937, 950, 951, 952, 980, 981, 983; Washington Metro: (at Herndon station)
Dulles Toll Road
Dulles, Virginia
Aviation Drive / Autopilot Drive	Westbound	Fairfax Connector: 981, 983
Washington Dulles International Airport Arrivals Door	Westbound Terminal, Eastbound station	Fairfax Connector: 981, 983; Washington Flyer; Virginia Breeze; Megabus; Washington Metro: (at Washington Dulles International Airport station)

== Background ==
The 5A originally operated under the “North Reston Express Line” in the 1970s before being discontinued in the 1990s being replaced by a combination of Fairfax Connector routes.

Service began on December 4, 2000 to connect service to Dulles International Airport from Downtown Washington, D.C.

The line is unique for being the only WMATA bus line that runs to Loudoun County, has a connection with any Virginia non-commuter services, and is responsible for providing a regular link between the two services. The original $1.10 one-way fare was seen as a bargain compared with other transportation modes in the area, including Shenandoah Valley Commuter Bus.

In 2014, it was reported that the 5A line was partly responsible for Dulles Airport monthly ridership record. WMATA also provides higher levels of service on the line in special times of need, especially on certain holidays.

All route 5A weekend service was suspended due to WMATA's response to the COVID-19 pandemic beginning on March 21, 2020. Weekend service was fully restored on August 23, 2020.

On September 10, 2020 as part of its FY2022 proposed budget, WMATA proposed to reduce time frequency on route 5A service in order to reduce costs and low federal funds. Although, WMATA planned to eliminate route 5A and replace it with the Silver Line service on its previous proposals.

Due to rising cases of the COVID-19 Omicron variant, the service was reduced to its Saturday service on weekdays. Full weekday service resumed on February 7, 2022.

Following the 5A's elimination, there has been calls from the public to restore the 5A when Metrorail is closed, due to late night arrivals and departures at Dulles. Although WMATA did proposed a service to Dulles during overnight hours in its Better Bus Draft Visionary Network, the proposed route did not go through during its final 2025 Redesign Network. However, the route was mentioned under WMATA's FY2027 budget plan.

== Silver Line ==
In 2010, WMATA started a public planning forum, to create the Silver Line route to run to Dulles Airport. The Silver Line would bring riders access via train to serve in Maryland, Washington D.C. and the northeastern portion of Virginia. This project is under Phase 2 of the Silver Line, as Phase 1 runs up to Wiehle–Reston East station. Construction of Phase 2 started in 2014; it was scheduled to open in 2020. Metro officials then announced that the second phase may not be ready for service until about September 2020. Metro later re-evaluated the timetable for the second phase's launch and anticipates it would be ready for service on April 1, 2021, after the agency determines a budget for the 2020–2021 fiscal year (and having taken the impact of the COVID-19 pandemic). Opening of Phase 2 was further delayed for July 2021 and later November 2022.

=== Dulles Airport station ===
Since November 15, 2022, Washington Dulles International Airport has on its own Metro station, as the station was built as part of Phase 2 of the Silver Line project. The station was originally planned to be underground, but the plans call for an above-ground station, which will be located next to daily parking garage 1 of the airport. The station is connected to the terminal building using the then-existing pedestrian tunnel which connects the hourly and daily parking lots and parking garage 1 to the baggage claim level of the airport terminal; it is equipped with moving sidewalks. The Dulles International Airport Metro station opened on November 15, 2022 and replaced the 5A on November 16.

== See also ==
- Greenbelt–BWI Thurgood Marshall Airport Express Line
