= West Falls Church station =

Washington Metro station

West Falls Church VT
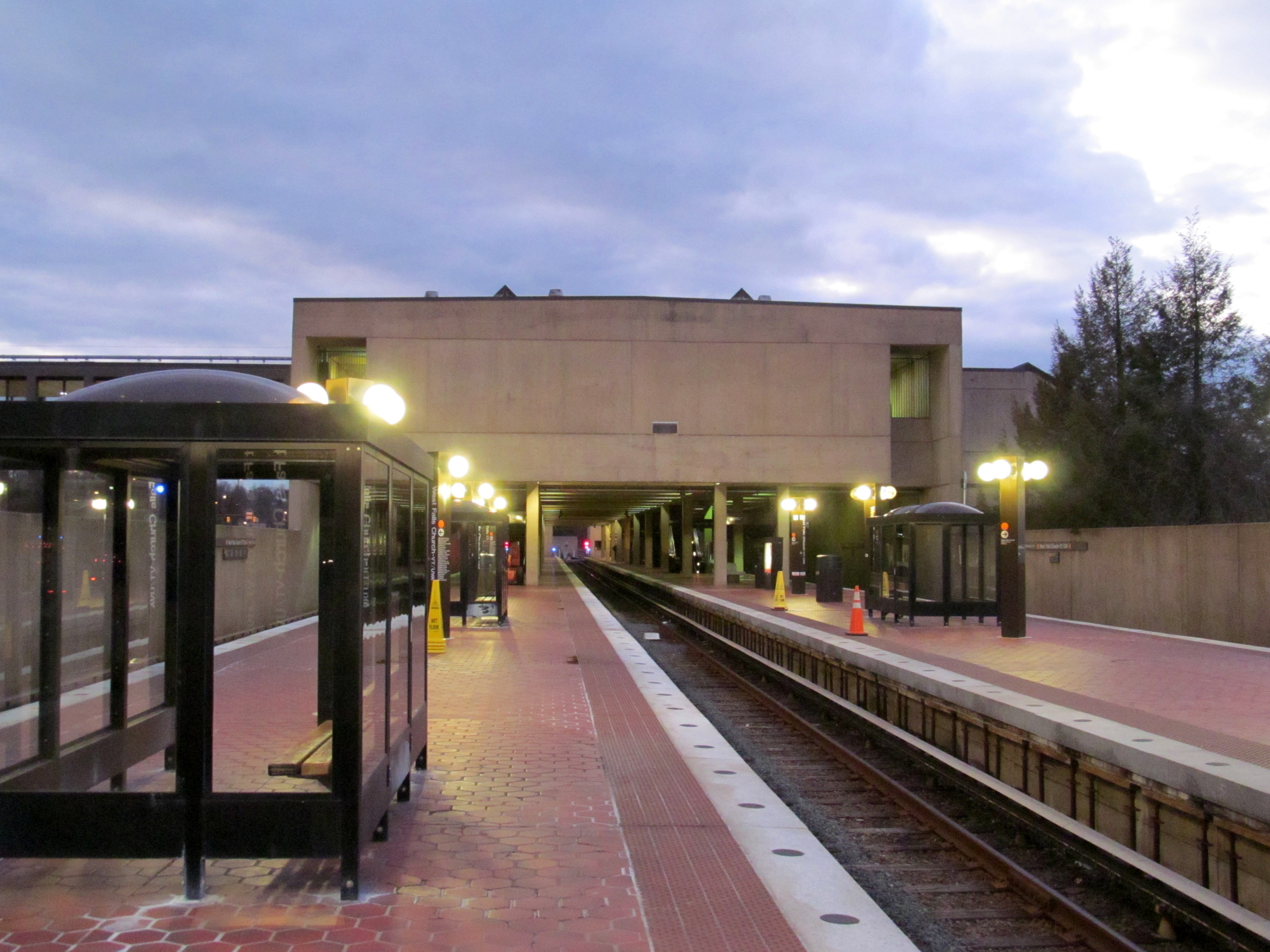
- The center track of West Falls Church station, used for train storage

General information
- Location: Idylwood, Virginia, U.S.
- Coordinates: 38.9007928°N 77.1889651°W
- Owner: Washington Metropolitan Area Transit Authority
- Platforms: 2 island platforms
- Tracks: 3
- Connections: Metrobus: F20; Fairfax Connector: 703; Virginia Breeze

Construction
- Structure type: At-grade
- Parking: 2,009 spaces
- Cycle facilities: Capital Bikeshare, 40 racks, 22 lockers
- Accessible: Yes

Other information
- Station code: K06

History
- Opened: June 7, 1986; 40 years ago
- Rebuilt: 2020
- Former names: West Falls Church (1986–1999, 2011–2022); West Falls Church–VT/UVA (1999–2011)

Passengers
- 2025: 1,736 (average weekday)
- Rank: 83 of 98

Services
Preceding station	Washington Metro	Following station
Dunn Loring toward Vienna	Orange Line	East Falls Church toward New Carrollton
Route map
Location

West Falls Church station is a Washington Metro station in Idylwood, Virginia on the Orange Line, the first station inside the Capital Beltway on the Orange Line going east. It is one of only two stations in the system to have three tracks, the other being the National Airport station. The center track is used for storage and relaying trains to the adjacent Falls Church Yard.

== Facilities ==
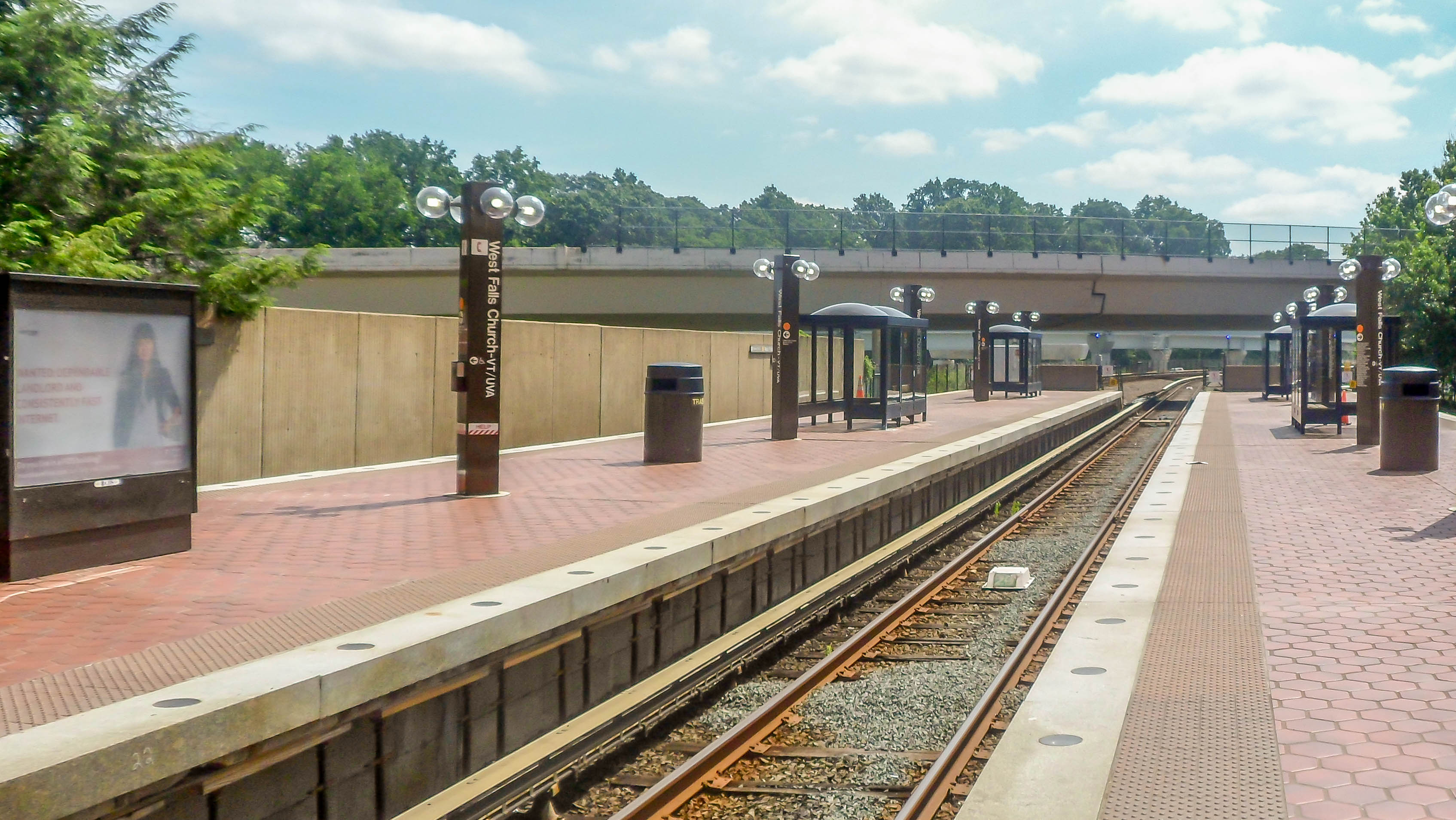
A view of the east end of the platforms in May 2015, open to the weather. The Silver Line viaduct can be seen in the distance

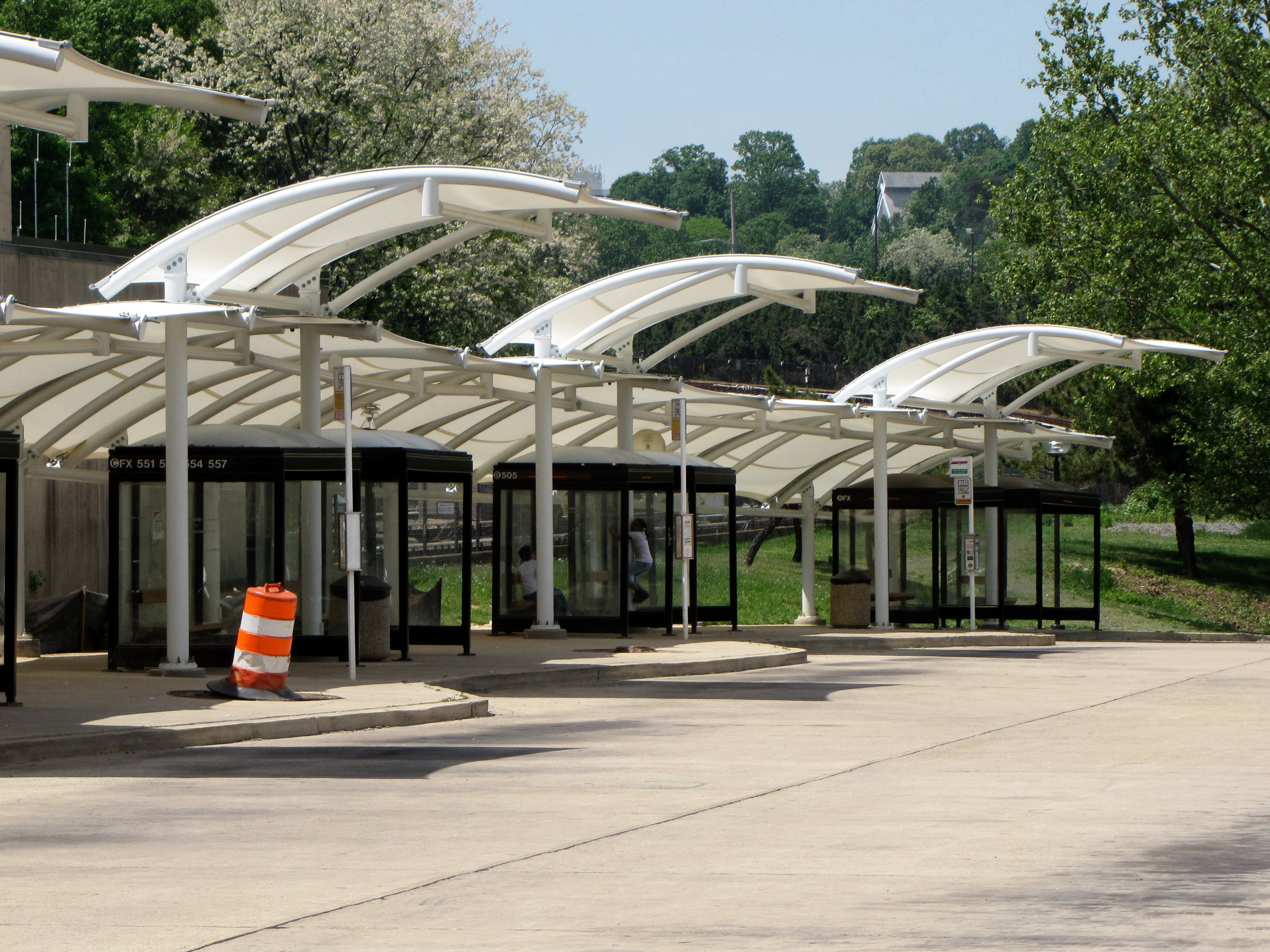
Bus bays at West Falls Church station

The station serves the suburban community of Falls Church and the Northern Virginia Center operated by Virginia Tech. Although Virginia Tech previously shared the space with the University of Virginia, as of June 2020, the University of Virginia has left the center. While the station has a street address on Haycock Road, it is physically located in the median of Interstate 66 near Virginia State Route 7 (Leesburg Pike); riders access the platform and mezzanine using an elevated walkway from the parking area.

This is a suburban transfer station, as commuter buses that serve communities near the Dulles Toll and Access Roads (Virginia State Route 267) connect to the Metro system at West Falls Church using a bus-only exit from the Access Road. These buses include Fairfax Connector to points within Fairfax, including Reston and Herndon, Metrobus to Tysons Corner, and Loudoun County Transit reverse commute routes to businesses including AOL and MCI and transfer points in Dulles.

With the opening of the Silver Line on July 26, 2014, many commuter bus routes that formerly terminated at West Falls Church were rerouted to instead terminate at locations along the new Silver Line stations in Tysons and Reston. West Falls Church was also the original staging point for Washington Flyer buses to Dulles Airport, but this shifted to Wiehle-Reston East with the opening of the Silver Line.

The Silver Line joins the Orange Line via a flying junction immediately east of this station but does not serve the station. Plans originally called for the Silver Line to stop at West Falls Church, but it was cut out of the final plan.

== History ==
The station opened on June 7, 1986. Its opening coincided with the completion of 9.1 miles (14.6 km) of rail west of the Ballston–MU station and the opening of the East Falls Church, Dunn Loring and Vienna stations.

In 1999, the station was renamed West Falls Church–VT/UVA when the acronym for Virginia Tech and the University of Virginia were added to the station's name, two years after the dedication of the shared graduate center. These initialisms were moved to a subtitle location on November 3, 2011.

In May 2018, Metro announced an extensive renovation of platforms at twenty stations across the system. The West Falls Church station platforms would be rebuilt starting in late 2020.

From May 23 until August 15, 2020, this station was closed due to the platform reconstruction project which closed stations west of Ballston–MU station. On August 16, 2020, the station reopened as the Orange Line terminus when Silver and Orange Line trains were able to bypass East Falls Church station.

Per request by the Fairfax County Board of Supervisors, the initials for the University of Virginia were dropped from the station's secondary name on September 11, 2022, to reflect its departure from the nearby Northern Virginia Center.

On June 3, 2023, this station was closed for track replacement, affecting stations west of Ballston–MU station. Service resumed on June 26, 2023.
