= Vienna station (Washington Metro) =

Washington Metro station

Vienna Fairfax–GMU
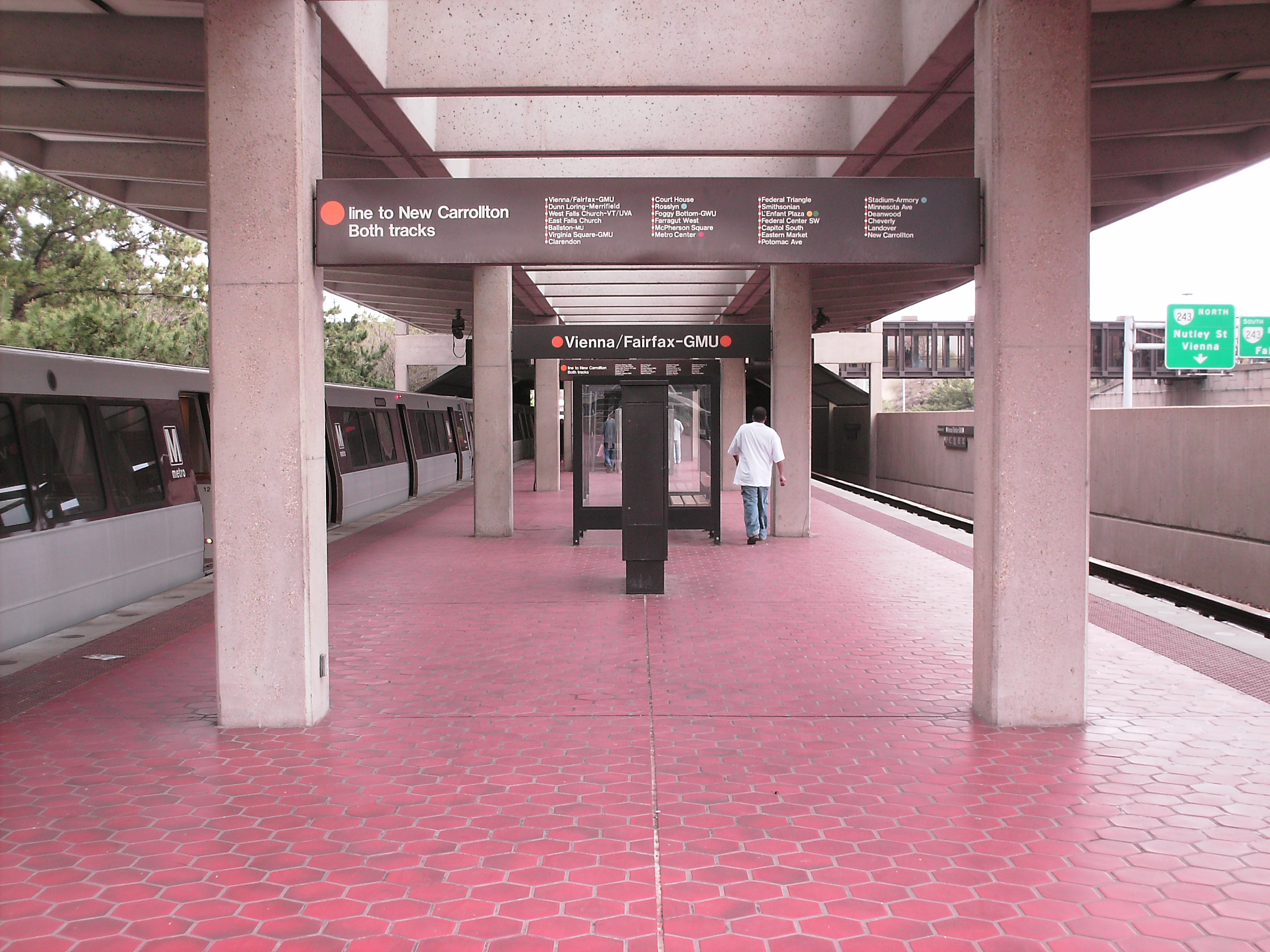
- The Vienna station of the Washington Metro in Fairfax, Virginia in April 2008

General information
- Location: 9550 Saintsbury Drive; Fairfax, Virginia, U.S.
- Coordinates: 38.8776013°N 77.2722884°W
- Owner: Washington Metropolitan Area Transit Authority
- Platforms: 1 island platform
- Tracks: 2
- Connections: Metrobus: F24, F50, F61; CUE: Gold, Green; Fairfax Connector: 461, 463, 660, 662, 663, 670, 671, 672, 698; George Mason University Shuttles; BestBus

Construction
- Structure type: Surface
- Parking: 5,840 spaces
- Cycle facilities: Capital Bikeshare, 54 racks, 56 lockers
- Accessible: Yes

Other information
- Station code: K08

History
- Opened: June 7, 1986; 40 years ago
- Rebuilt: 2020
- Former names: Vienna (1986–1999); Vienna/Fairfax–GMU (1999–2011)

Passengers
- 2025: 4,931 (average weekday)
- Rank: 33 of 98

Services
Preceding station	Washington Metro	Following station
Terminus	Orange Line	Dunn Loring toward New Carrollton
Route map
Location

Vienna station is a Washington Metro station in Fairfax County, Virginia. It is the western terminus of the Orange Line. The station is in the median of Interstate 66 at Nutley Street, also known as Virginia State Route 243, near Fairfax.

The station can be accessed from I-66 without merging onto Nutley Street by a series of ramps that transport commuters to the station's north and south side parking complexes. From the parking areas, riders use elevated walkways that bridge the east and westbound lanes of I-66 to reach the platform and mezzanine. The station provides easy access to the nearby Town of Vienna, the City of Fairfax, and the main campus of George Mason University. Service began on June 7, 1986.

== History ==
Although originally identified as the western terminus of the Orange Line in the 1968 plan, by 1978, Fairfax County was debating whether the initial terminus should be at the Vienna location or at another location in Tysons (then primarily referred to as Tysons Corner). After much public debate and public comment, the Fairfax County Board of Supervisors endorsed the Vienna routing. The endorsement was made after determining it would cost an additional $59 million and take another five years to complete the line to Tysons. Metro service to Tysons was later established as part of the Silver Line, which opened in 2014.

The groundbreaking for the station took place on September 8, 1982. At the time, the final facility was to have cost $17.6 million with parking for 2,000 vehicles. After nearly four years of construction, the station opened on June 7, 1986, as the western terminus of the Orange Line. Its opening coincided with the completion of 9.1 miles (14.6 km) of rail from the Ballston–MU station and the opening of the East Falls Church, West Falls Church, and Dunn Loring stations.

By 1993, officials in Fairfax City were looking to add "Fairfax" to the station name. In March 1999, the station name was changed to Vienna/Fairfax–GMU, which had often been criticized because GMU was 4.2 miles (6.8 km) from the station.

In November 2011, the Metro Board adopted guidelines limiting station names to 19 characters. Several station names were split in two: Vienna's "primary name" returned to Vienna and Fairfax–GMU became a "secondary name"/subtitle on Metro maps. (This is despite Vienna/Fairfax–GMU only being 18 characters long, counting the slash and dash.)

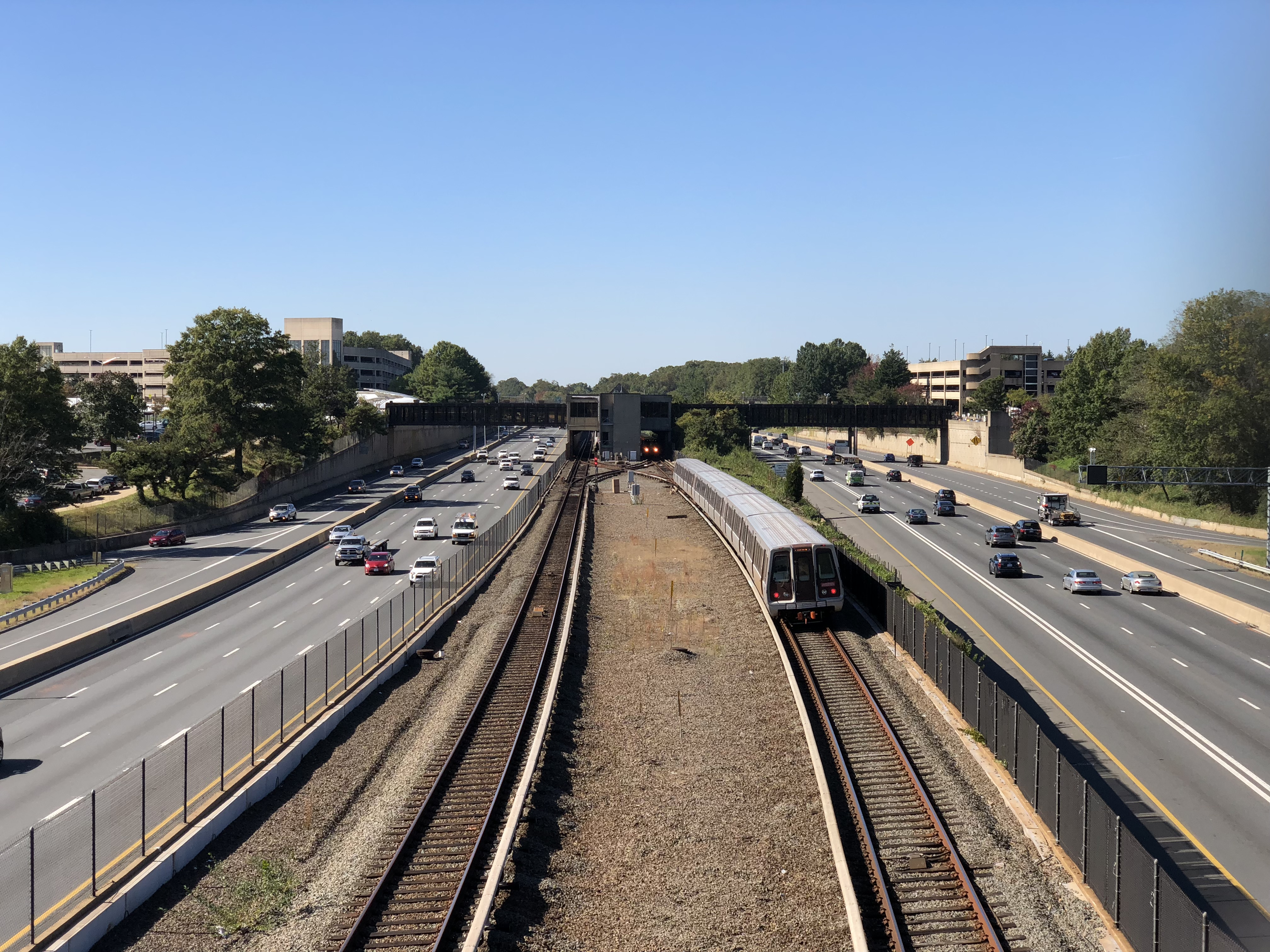
Vienna station viewed from Nutley St in October 2018

In May 2018, Metro announced an extensive renovation of platforms at twenty stations across the system. The platforms at the Vienna station would be rebuilt starting in mid-2020.

From May 23 until September 7, 2020, the station was closed due to the platform reconstruction project, which closed stations west of Ballston–MU.

On June 3, 2023, the station was closed for track replacement, affecting stations west of Ballston–MU. Service resumed on July 17, 2023.

On June 22, 2024, many Fairfax Connector bus routes to points west (Centreville, Chantilly, Fair Oaks, and Penderbrook) stopped serving the station as part of the agency's CCVT (Centreville-Chantilly-Vienna-Tysons) Phase 1 service changes. Many of them were canceled or changed to end at the new Monument Drive Transit Center, with express/limited-stop routes 660/663/670/671 (weekday peak hours) and 662/672 (all other times) providing all replacement service between Monument Drive Transit Center and Vienna at higher frequencies than before. Some passengers can also transfer between routes at Stone Road and Stringfellow Road.

== Transit-oriented development ==
In line with high-density development, the Fairlee Metro-West project aims to increase the housing density around the Vienna station from 60 single-family homes to 2,250 condominiums and townhouses. This development has been controversial, as many Orange Line commuters believe the system will be pushed beyond capacity during rush hours. As of May 2009, the project is under construction.

== Station Layout ==
The Vienna station consists of a single island platform located in the median of the I-66 freeway, with a mezzanine containing fare gates and other station equipment located above the platform. Track K1 is the nominal eastbound track, while K2 is the nominal westbound track. As the western terminal of the Orange Line, trains utilize a crossover just east of the platform to access whichever track is open when approaching and to switch onto the eastbound K1 track when departing. Access to the station is via two bridges crossing the freeway to the north and south, serving bus bays and parking garages on both sides of the station. Tail tracks extend a considerable length to the west of the station, used both as train storage and as a provision for a future western extension.
