= Virginia Breeze =

Intercity bus service in Virginia, US

Overview
- Owner: Virginia Department of Rail and Public Transportation
- Locale: Commonwealth of Virginia
- Transit type: Bus
- Number of lines: 5
- Number of stations: 36
- Annual ridership: 60,000
- Headquarters: Richmond, Virginia
- Website: https://virginiabreeze.drpt.virginia.gov/

Operation
- Began operation: 1 December 2017
- Operators: Megabus, a subsidiary of Coach USA (most routes); Academy Bus (Tidewater Current)

Technical
- System length: 1,450 miles

The Virginia Breeze is an intercity bus service introduced by the Virginia Department of Rail and Public Transportation. It is designed to connect underserved rural areas. The system operates five bus routes connecting different parts of Virginia and Washington, D.C.

The service includes stops at Richmond International Airport, Dulles International Airport, and Washington Union Station, facilitating connections to planes, trains, and other buses. At Union Station, passengers can connect with intercity bus and Amtrak services to cities along the Northeast Corridor, including Baltimore, Philadelphia, New York City, and Boston.

== History ==
Virginia Breeze began operations in December 2017, funded through the Federal Transit Administration’s Intercity Bus Program and managed by the Virginia Department of Rail and Public Transportation. It initially offered a single route between Blacksburg and Washington, D.C. Today, Virginia Breeze Bus Lines connects communities throughout Virginia with five routes.

== Operations ==
While Megabus and other subsidiaries of Coach USA operate the initial four routes, Academy Bus operates the Tidewater Current route.

== Routes ==
=== Capital Connector ===
The Capital Connector starts at Martinsville and stops at Danville, South Boston, Farmville and Richmond, before arriving at Union Station.

=== Highlands Rhythm ===
The Highlands Rhythm runs starts at Bristol and stops at Wytheville, Radford, Christiansburg, Salem, Lexington, Staunton, Harrisonburg, Front Royal, Dulles International Airport and West Falls Church Metrorail station; its terminus is at Union Station.

=== Piedmont Express ===
The Piedmont Express runs between Danville and Washington. This route starts at Danville and has 8 intermediate stops, which include: Altavista, Lynchburg, and Amherst, Charlottesville, Culpeper, Warrenton, Gainesville, and Dulles International Airport before arriving at Washington D.C. Union Station.

=== Tidewater Current ===
Launched in 2026, the Tidewater Current links Virginia Beach with Harrisonburg, making intermediary stops in Norfolk, Newport News, Williamsburg, New Kent, Richmond International Airport and downtown in Richmond, Charlottesville, and Staunton. Originally proposed in 2025, the route is 235 miles and will take approximately six hours. This is the first route serving the Hampton Roads region.

=== Valley Flyer ===
The Valley Flyer is the busiest route of the system. This route starts at Blacksburg and has 7 intermediate stops. These are Christiansburg, Lexington, Staunton, Harrisonburg, Front Royal, Dulles International Airport, and West Falls Church Metrorail station. Its terminus is at Washington D.C. Union Station.

== See also ==
- Intercity buses in the United States
