= MetroWest (Virginia) =

Transit oriented development program in America

MetroWest is a transit-oriented development being developed by PulteGroup (residential) and CRC (previously Clark Realty) (commercial) adjacent to the Vienna Metro station in Fairfax County, Virginia. It replaces 65 single-family detached houses with a mixed-use neighborhood including up to 1,174 residential units, up to 190,000 square feet (18,000 m^{2}) of retail space, and up to 1,000,000 square feet (90,000 m^{2}) of office space. The north boundary is Saintsbury Drive (south of the southern entrance to the Vienna/Fairfax Metro station), and the south boundary is Lee Highway (U.S. 29). In July 2009, Fairfax County approved Pulte's request to change the allocation of space to provide more office space and less apartment space.

The project spurred significant local opposition due to its relative density compared to the surrounding area, which is generally suburban in character. Neighbors fear increased development will lead to increased traffic congestion, while planners argue that dense development clustered near transit stations and diverse land uses generates less traffic congestion on a per unit basis than low density development, and is the only way to reduce or manage congestion on a regional basis.

The primary proposal was approved by the Fairfax County Board of Supervisors on March 27, 2006, to incorporate all of the former Fairlee residential subdivision, as well as some adjacent parcels. Fairlee was razed at the time the project was approved, construction begun in 2007.

In addition to a Transportation Demand Management Plan to reduce congestion in the development's immediate vicinity, Pulte released a list of proffers as agreed to with Fairfax County. Among these are commitments to maximum density, construction schedule, and amenities/buildings accessible to all (such as a community center, seasonal skating rink and town square).

Development was postponed due to a housing market correction that has impacted Fairfax County as well as most densely populated areas in the United States, but finally began in November 2008. In June 2009, Pulte requested a modification to the plan to swap out approximately 700,000 square feet (65,000 m^{2}) of planned residential space for use as office instead; this request was approved by Fairfax County in July 2009, reducing the total number of planned residential units to 1,174.

In 2013, developers Pulte and Clark pursued an alternative to leaving much of the razed site undeveloped by releasing a scaled down development plan, most notably replacing the multistory office and residential buildings with single-story retail shops. Developer representatives insisted the companies were still committed to the original plan but cited lukewarm development interest as the reason for the plan's revision. During a public meeting in June 2013, Fairfax County Supervisor Lynda Smyth reiterated her commitment to developing a full town center consistent with the original plan approved by Fairfax County, saying the revised plan had not been submitted for approval and in her opinion the board of supervisors would not give approval if it were submitted.

In late 2015, Pulte submitted a Partial Proffered Condition Amendment (PCA 2003-PR-022) proposing to delete proffer 5.b. Timing of High Rise Construction. The intent of this proffer was to incentivize the construction of the office and retail component of the MetroWest development that is primarily owned by Clark Realty. Clark expressed interest in joining with Pulte in the PCA, although as of early 2016, Clark had not identified a timeline for submittal to Fairfax County. A PC zoning hearing for Pulte was scheduled on April 16, 2016.

In 2016, Pulte completed construction of five four-story residential condo buildings (160 units) with underground parking and elevator service. Pulte indicated it was interested in constructing buildings 14 and 15.

On October 24, 2016, Pulte and CRC held a public outreach meeting at the Providence Recreation Center to discuss the pending Pulte Proffer Condition Amendment (PCA) and to provide updates and obtain feedback from the surrounding neighborhoods about the final phasing and build out of MetroWest. Pulte indicated that it plans to start construction of four of the five planned senior living (55-and-over age-restricted) residential buildings in 2017, however this phase of the project was delayed. Additionally, Pulte placed their pending PCA application (PCA 2003-PR-022) on indefinite deferral. Their PCA proposes to modify previous commitments to permit the development of its remaining residential buildings. CRC discussed with the community current design, market and financing constraints that have held them back from initiating construction of their portion (commercial) of MetroWest. CRC committed to the community that they would do additional market research and design work to develop some draft design concepts that they would bring back to the community for review and comment in early 2017.

In spring 2018, Pulte reiterated its plan to start construction of four of the five senior living (55-and-over age-restricted) residential buildings. The Fairfax County Planning Commission approved FDPA 2003-PR-022 SSL Development Company, LLC to permit the development of an assisted living facility in the fifth age-restricted residential building. Both projects were anticipated to start construction in 2018. The developers of MetroWest (Pulte and CRC) do not have any imminent plans to construct the mixed use core of the project. Fairfax County Supervisor Smyth continues to strongly encourage them to work together and with the community to move the project forward. CRC has recently partnered with Newmark Knight Frank (NKF), a New York commercial real estate firm, to find a tenant to lease a new 250,000 square feet (23,000 m^{2}). Class A office building that would help to anchor the build out of MetroWest.

In fall 2018, Pulte started construction of four of the five senior living residential buildings.

In 2019, Pulte plans to continue to construct four of five senior living residential buildings. Construction of the fifth building accommodating an assisted living by SSL Development Company, LLC will start this year.

In early 2021, Pulte Homes and the CRC Cos. announced that they were looking to build six buildings with at least 980 apartment units and 41,500 square feet (3,860 m^{2}) of retail in the core of MetroWest. This construction would require Fairfax County to sign off on a change to the original proffers and allow these additional projects to move forward without CRC having secured a tenant to anchor the planned office building on the site.

On November 9, 2022, the Fairfax County Board of Supervisors approved the removal of proffers requiring a certain percentage of development be dedicated to office space, recognizing that the office market had changed. This has cleared the way to begin construction that will initially consist of two residential buildings with retail space. Developers have indicated that they will develop some short-term park-like spaces on land that will be used for future development.
