= Valley Connector =

Commuter bus service in Virginia, United States

The Valley Connector Regional Shuttle and Commuter Bus was a public transportation service provided by S & W Tours, LLC and Valley Connector, Inc. that provided weekday commuter bus service in the United States from northern Shenandoah Valley to Northern Virginia and Washington, D.C. Commuter bus service was terminated on January 31, 2011. The termination happened due to declining passenger revenues.

With five regular scheduled routes daily, it served Shenandoah County, Warren County, Frederick County, Clarke County and the City of Winchester.

Origination points in Shenandoah County included Woodstock. Origination points in Warren County included Front Royal and Linden.

Origination points in Frederick County, Clarke County and the City of Winchester area included the Waterloo Park-and-Ride and Berryville.

Destination points in Northern Virginia and Washington, D.C. included Arlington County and Fairfax County.

The routes included were

- Route 46 Woodstock to Washington
- Route 48 Front Royal to Vienna Metro
- Route 57 Front Royal to Washington via Dulles Airport
- Route 69 Winchester to Washington

Other transit services in Northern Shenandoah Valley include Winchester Transit, Page County Transit, and Front Royal Area Transit.

- Front Royal Area Transit (FRAT) provides weekday transit for the town of Front Royal.
- Page County Transit: The People Movers provides weekday transit for the town of Luray and weekday service between Luray and Front Royal.
- Winchester Transit provides weekday transit for the city of Winchester.
