= CUE Bus =

Public transit service in Fairfax, Virginia

CUE (City University Everyone)

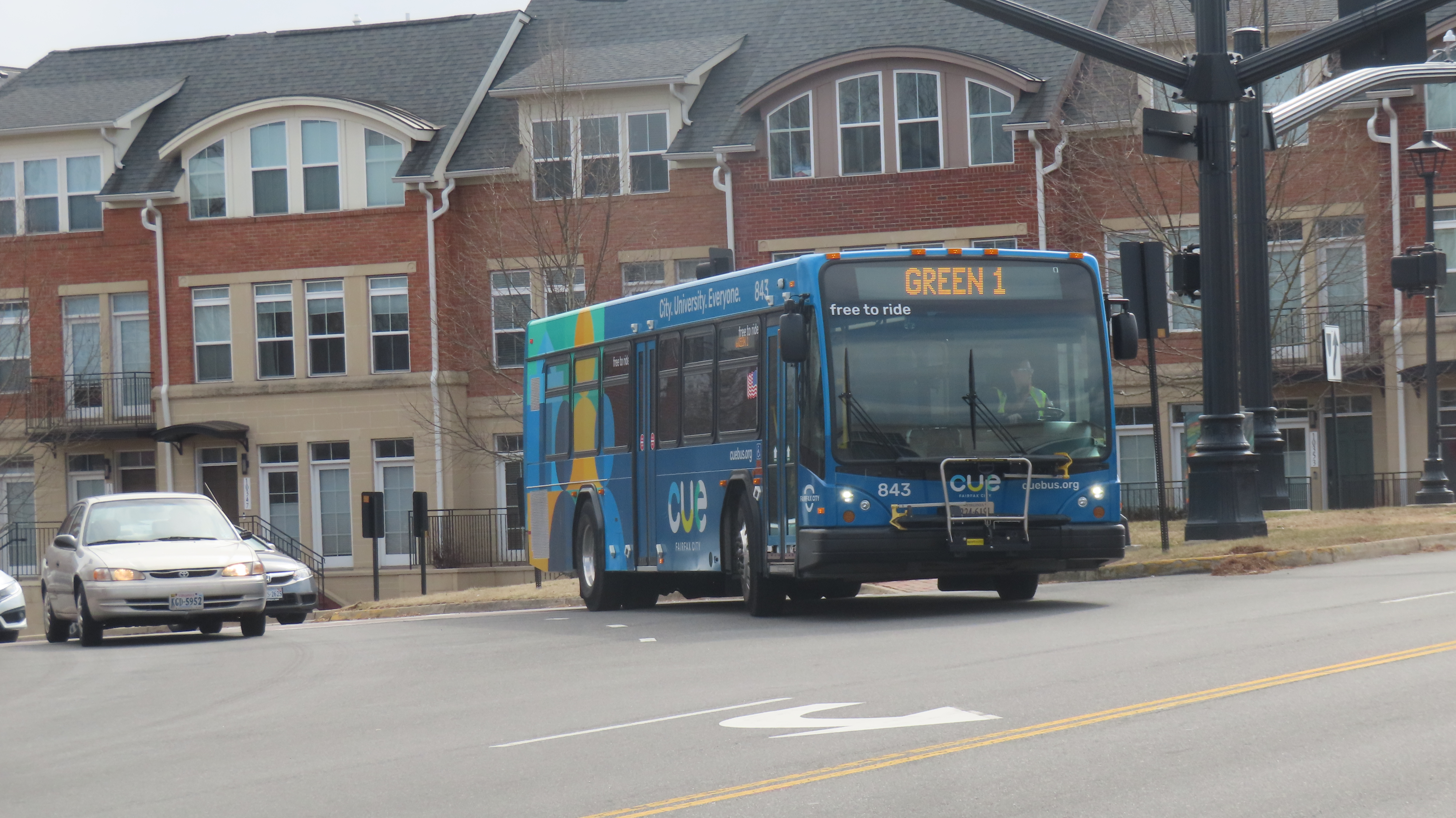
- CUE bus in downtown Fairfax
- Formerly: City University Energysaver
- Parent: City of Fairfax
- Founded: August 18, 1980; 46 years ago
- Locale: Fairfax, Virginia, US
- Service area: City of Fairfax; Vienna Metro station George Mason University
- Service type: Bus service
- Routes: 4 (2 clockwise loops, 2 counterclockwise loops)
- Stops: 186
- Fleet: 12 Gillig BRT
- Daily ridership: 2,700 (weekdays, Q2 2026)
- Annual ridership: 965,000 (2025)
- Fuel type: Diesel
- Website: www.fairfaxva.gov/Services/CUE-Bus

CUE Bus is a fare-free public transit bus service operated by the City of Fairfax, Virginia. It consists of two loop routes, and is independent of WMATA and the Fairfax Connector bus service operated by Fairfax County. In 2025, the system had a ridership of 965,000, or about 2,700 per weekday as of the second quarter of 2026.

== History ==
=== Early history ===
CUE Bus, originally standing for City University Energysaver, was founded on August 18, 1980 as a joint venture between the City of Fairfax and George Mason University to reduce campus parking demand and congestion and provide more transit connections for the community. By 1982, the full name was abandoned in favor of just the acronym CUE.

In 1986, Vienna Metro station opened and CUE redesigned its routes to serve it. To make way for the expanded CUE service to Vienna, Fairfax City canceled its Fairfax City Express bus service that ran directly to the District of Columbia.

In 2001, CUE installed equipment from NextBus, the first satellite-based live bus arrival time information system in the world. Six bus stops got displays showing the predicted arrival time of the upcoming buses. CUE was the first bus system in the Washington metropolitan area to introduce the technology.

On November 5, 2002, a Northern Virginia regional transportation sales tax referendum that would have added funding for roads and public transit was rejected 57% to 43% by voters. CUE was anticipated to be able to fund additional buses and frequency improvements if it had passed. The referendum was criticized by voters across the political spectrum, including anti-tax advocates and anti-highway environmentalists.

After the referendum's failure, CUE has not increased its service for over two decades due to serious funding challenges.

=== Rebrand and fare-free service ===
In 2020, CUE stopped collecting fares to reduce passenger contact during the COVID-19 pandemic. In January 2022, the City Council approved a plan to formalize a 3-year zero-fare pilot program that would make CUE free to ride through June 2025. In the spring of 2022, CUE was awarded a Transit Ridership Incentive Program grant from the Virginia Department of Rail and Public Transportation, extending the pilot through June 2026.

In 2023, CUE introduced a new livery and rebranded to City University Everyone.

By November 2025, the policy's fate was still being determined. While CUE steadily lost ridership for over a decade starting from 2008, the trend actually reversed due to the suspension of fare collection in 2020 - in spite of the pandemic, ridership actually started trending upward. During a presentation to City Council, James Gamez, a transit project manager of the consultant Kimley Horn, leading the evaluation on whether CUE should continue the zero-fare policy or resume fare collection, said: “This coming year, CUE is expected to exceed 1 million rides, and we’ve seen about a 60% increase from the pre-pandemic levels of ridership.”

After the grant expired, the city continued to fund fare-free CUE service in its annual budget; the buses remain free for all passengers as of August 2026.

== Routes and services ==
CUE operates two loop routes between George Mason University (Rappahannock Lane at Patriot Circle bus shelter) and the Vienna Metro station, each running in both directions for a total of four named routes. The Green loop, consisting of routes Green 1 (clockwise) and Green 2 (counterclockwise) operates on the east side of Fairfax, while the Gold loop, consisting of routes Gold 1 (clockwise) and Gold 2 (counterclockwise) operates on the west side. Headways on each individual route are approximately 30–35 minutes on weekdays and 60–70 minutes on weekday evenings and weekends.

All CUE routes run seven days a week with shorter hours on weekends. All service is suspended on New Year's Day, Thanksgiving, or Christmas. CUE provides special service only within Fairfax for Independence Day celebrations. On other city holidays, CUE runs either Saturday service or a reduced weekday schedule with one bus per route (frequency is cut to evening/weekend levels all day).

In addition to providing service to GMU and Vienna Metro, the CUE serves all major activity centers in the City of Fairfax, including Old Town Fairfax, Kamp Washington, Fairfax Circle and Fair City Mall.

== Fleet ==
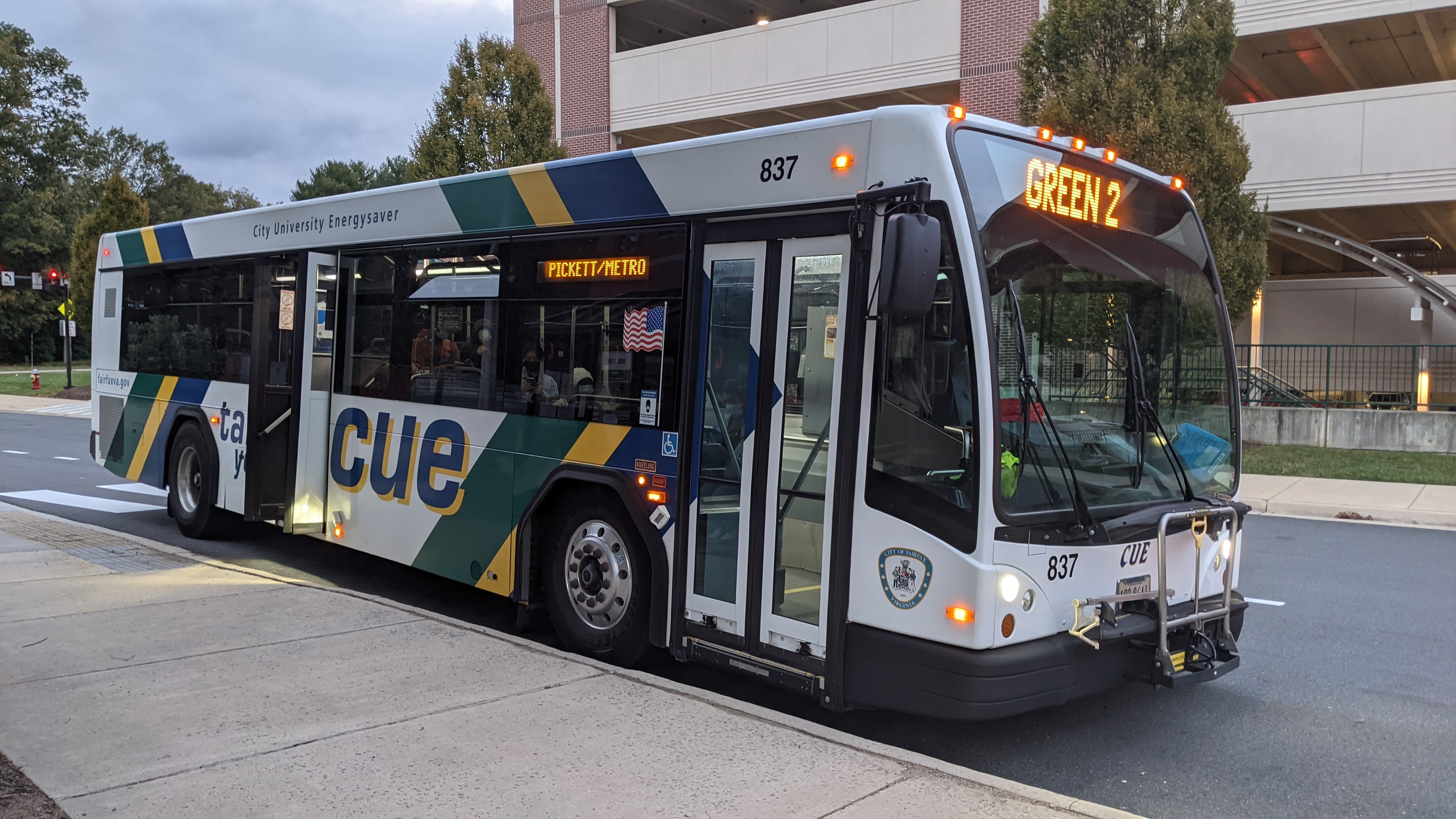
2015 CUE Gillig BRT bus

As of May 2022, the CUE Bus fleet is entirely clean diesel fueled. The system operates twelve 35 foot (11 m) Gillig BRT buses. Half of these vehicles replaced the remaining Gillig Phantom vehicles in the fall of 2015, while the others entered service in May 2022 replacing the agency's hybrid buses.

=== Retired fleet ===
| Delivered | Type | Retired | Notes |
|---|---|---|---|
| 1982 | Transportation Manufacturing Corporation; T-30 CityCruiser | 1997 | |
| 1986-2003 | Orion Bus Industries; Orion I | 2018 | |
| 1997-2003 | Gillig; Phantom 30' | 2015 | |
| 2009 | Gillig; Low Floor BRT HEV | 2022 | |

== See also ==
- DASH (Virginia), a fare-free bus system serving another city in Northern Virginia
- Blacksburg Transit, a fare-free city-run bus system serving another Virginia state university
