= Hatton Ferry =

Hatton Ferry is a poled cable ferry located 5.5 miles west of Scottsville, Virginia on the James River. It is the last poled ferry in the United States. The ferry crosses the river upstream of Scottsville between Albemarle County and Buckingham County.

A seasonal service, the Hatton Ferry operates on a weekend schedule from April to October. In 2009 the Virginia Department of Transportation (VDOT) ended funding and operation of the weekend. Ownership was then transferred to the Albemarle Charlottesville Historical Society (ACHS) as the result of a campaign led by ACHS President Steven G. Meeks. The ferry is now managed by the "Hatton Ferry" a non-profit organization established by the ACHS to oversee the operation of the ferry.

== How it works ==
The Hatton Ferry is a flat-bottomed boat with its deck only a few inches above the waterline. Two cables are attached to each of the boat's ends and guided by an overhead wire connecting the two river banks about 700 feet away. The cables control the ferry in its passage, allowing the stern to swing downstream while stabilizing the prow.

The boat is caught at an angle by the regular current and floats across the river. As the ferry approaches the riverbank, the ferryman cranks a hand winch to retract the cable at the boat's stern. With a few jabs of the ferryman's pole at the trip's end, the ferry slips onto its landing.

== History ==
James A. Brown began operating a store and ferry at this site in the late 1870s. A few years later, he bought the land and the store became a stop on the Richmond and Allegheny Railroad which was built along the towpath of the James River and Kanawha Canal in the 1880s.

In 1914, James B. Tindall purchased the store, ferry, and ferry rights. He operated the ferry until 1940 when it was taken over by the Virginia Department of Highways. A new ferry was built by the Virginia Department of Transportation, and it was rededicated in September 1973. The dedication ceremonies included actor Richard Thomas, who played the character John-Boy Walton on the TV series, The Waltons, and Mrs. Doris Hamner, the mother of Waltons creator and writer Earl Hamner, Jr., who lived at nearby Schuyler provided the basis for the fictional stories.

The Hatton Ferry is the last poled ferry in the United States.

== Current operations and schedule ==
With most regular traffic crossing the river nearby using the highway bridge at Scottsville located five miles downstream, the Hatton Ferry operates on a weekend schedule from early April to the end of October (river levels permitting) and beginning with 2010 is now owned and managed by the Albemarle Charlottesville Historical Society.

== VDOT ceases operation ==
Amid budget cuts VDOT ceased funding for the ferry as part of its 2009 service reductions. Albemarle County appropriated $9,300 to keep the ferry running through October 1, 2009, although the funding may be made up from donations to the ACHS. In early 2010, VDOT transferred title to the Hatton Ferry to the non-profit 501 (c) 3 Albemarle Charlottesville Historical Society.

== Albemarle Charlottesville Historical Society ceases operation ==
On January 14, 2025, the ACHS Board of Directors voted to demolish and remove the Hatton Ferry barge.
