= List of United States post office murals in Virginia =

Following is a list of United States post office murals created in Virginia between 1934 and 1943.

| Location | Mural title | Image | Artist | Date | Notes | NRHPlisted |
|---|---|---|---|---|---|---|
| Altavista | The Growing Community | | Herman Maril | 1940 | oil on canvas | |
| Appalachia | Appalachia | | Lucile Blanch | 1940 | oil on canvas | |
| Arlington | An Old-Fashioned Picnic at Great Falls | | Auriel Bessemer | 1940 | | yes |
| Arlington | Apple Harvest | | Auriel Bessemer | 1940 | | yes |
| Arlington | Arlington Polo Players at Fort Meyer | | Auriel Bessemer | 1940 | | yes |
| Arlington | Captain John Smith Meets the Massawomek Indians | | Auriel Bessemer | 1940 | | yes |
| Arlington | Robert E. Lee Accepting Command of the Armies in Virginia | | Auriel Bessemer | 1940 | | yes |
| Arlington | Tobacco Picking in the Late Colonial Era | | Auriel Bessemer | 1940 | | yes |
| Bassett | Manufacture of Furniture | | Walter Carnelli | 1939 | fresco | |
| Berryville | Clark County Products, 1939 | | Edwin S. Lewis | 1940 | | |
| Bluefield | Coal Mining | | Richard Hay Kenah | 1942 | tempera | |
| Chatham | Harvest Season in Southern Virginia | | Carson Davenport | 1938 | oil on canvas | |
| Christiansburg | Great Road | | Paul DeTroot | 1939 | oil on canvas | yes |
| Emporia | Country Saw Mill | | Andree Ruellan | 1941 | oil on canvas | |
| Harrisonburg | County Fair, Trading, Courthouse Square | | William Calfee | 1943 | four panels | |
| Hopewell | Capt. Francis Eppes Making Friends with the Appomattox Indians | | Edmund Archer | 1939 | oil on canvas | |
| Luray | Luray-1840 | | Sheffield Kagy | 1939 | oil on canvas | |
| Orange | Upland Pastures | | Arnold Friedman | 1937 | oil on canvas | |
| Petersburg | Agricultural Scenes in Virginia | | William Calfee | 1937 | oil on canvas | |
| Petersburg | Riding to Hounds | | Edwin S. Lewis | 1937 | | |
| Phoebus | Chesapeake Fisherman | | William Calfee | 1941 | fresco; winner of the 48-State Mural Competition | |
| Radford | The return of Mary Draper Ingles | | Alexander B. Clayton | 1942 | oil on canvas | |
| Richmond | Pocahontas rescuing Captain John Smith | | Paul Cadmus | 1939 | Removed from the Courthouse Annex in 1972, relocated to the Lewis F. Powell Jr. United States Courthouse | |
| Richmond | Sir Walter Raleigh | | Paul Cadmus | 1939 | Removed from the Courthouse Annex in 1972, relocated to the Lewis F. Powell Jr. United States Courthouse | |
| Richmond | William Byrd | | Paul Cadmus | 1939 | Removed from the Courthouse Annex in 1972, relocated to the Lewis F. Powell Jr. United States Courthouse | |
| Richmond | Stuart's Raiders at the Swollen Ford | | Jared French | 1939 | Relocated to the Lewis F. Powell Jr. United States Courthouse | |
| Richmond | Jeb Stuart | | Jared French | 1939 | Relocated to the Lewis F. Powell Jr. United States Courthouse | |
| Richmond | John Pelham | | Jared French | 1939 | Relocated to the Lewis F. Powell Jr. United States Courthouse | |
| Rocky Mount | Life in Rockymount | | Roy Hilton | 1938 | three panels | |
| Smithfield | Captain John Smith Trading with the Indians | | William Abbott Cheever | 1941 | oil on canvas | |
| Strasburg | Apple Orchard | | Sarah Jane Blakeslee | 1938 | | |
| Stuart | Receiving the Mail on the Farm | | John E. Costigan | 1942 | oil on canvas | |
| Tazewell | Sheep-Mother and Child and Mining | | William H. Calfee | 1940 | oil on canvas | |
| Virginia Beach | Old Dominion Conversation Piece | | John H. R. Pickett | 1939 | oil on canvas | |
