= Christiansburg Downtown Historic District =

Historic district in Virginia, United States

- U.S. National Register of Historic Places
- U.S. Historic district
- Virginia Landmarks Register
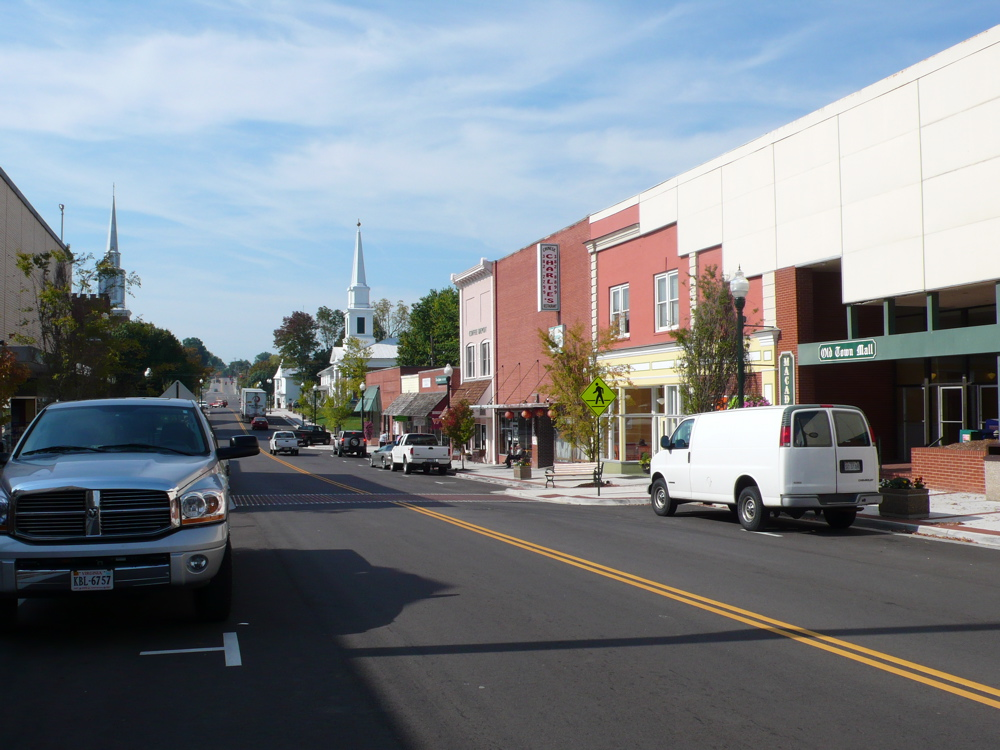
- Christiansburg Downtown Historic District, October 2008

- Location within Virginia Location within the United States
- Location: E. & W. Main, N. & S. Franklin Sts., Christiansburg, Virginia
- Coordinates: 37°07′47″N 80°24′31″W
- Area: 19.844 acres (8.031 ha)
- Built: c. 1800
- Architectural style: Greek Revival, Queen Anne, Moderne, Art Deco, Late 19th and early 20th century revivals, Late 19th and early 20th century American movements
- NRHP reference No.: 13000340
- VLR No.: 154-5025

Significant dates
- Added to NRHP: May 28, 2013
- Designated VLR: March 21, 2013

Christiansburg Downtown Historic District is a national historic district located at Christiansburg, Montgomery County, Virginia. The district encompasses 32 contributing buildings, 1 contributing site, and 2 contributing objects in the central business district of Christiansburg. The district includes a variety of one-, two-, or three-story commercial or office buildings built primarily from the 1915-1950 period. The courthouse square is the cultural and historic center of the district. Notable buildings include the Taylor Office Building (c. 1870), Bank of Christiansburg (1963), Dr. George Anderson House (c. 1800, c. 1890), Zirkle Building (1910), Cromer Furniture Building (c. 1920), Presbyterian Manse (1876), Barnes-Surface Motor Co. (1911, c. 1920), Virginia Inn Hotel (c. 1915, c. 1920), and Leggett's Department Store (1958). The contributing objects are the Confederate Memorial (1883) and War Memorial (1953). Located in the district and separately listed are Christiansburg Presbyterian Church, U.S. Post Office, and Phlegar Building.

It was listed on the National Register of Historic Places in 2013.
