= Court House station =

Washington Metro station in Virginia, US

Court House
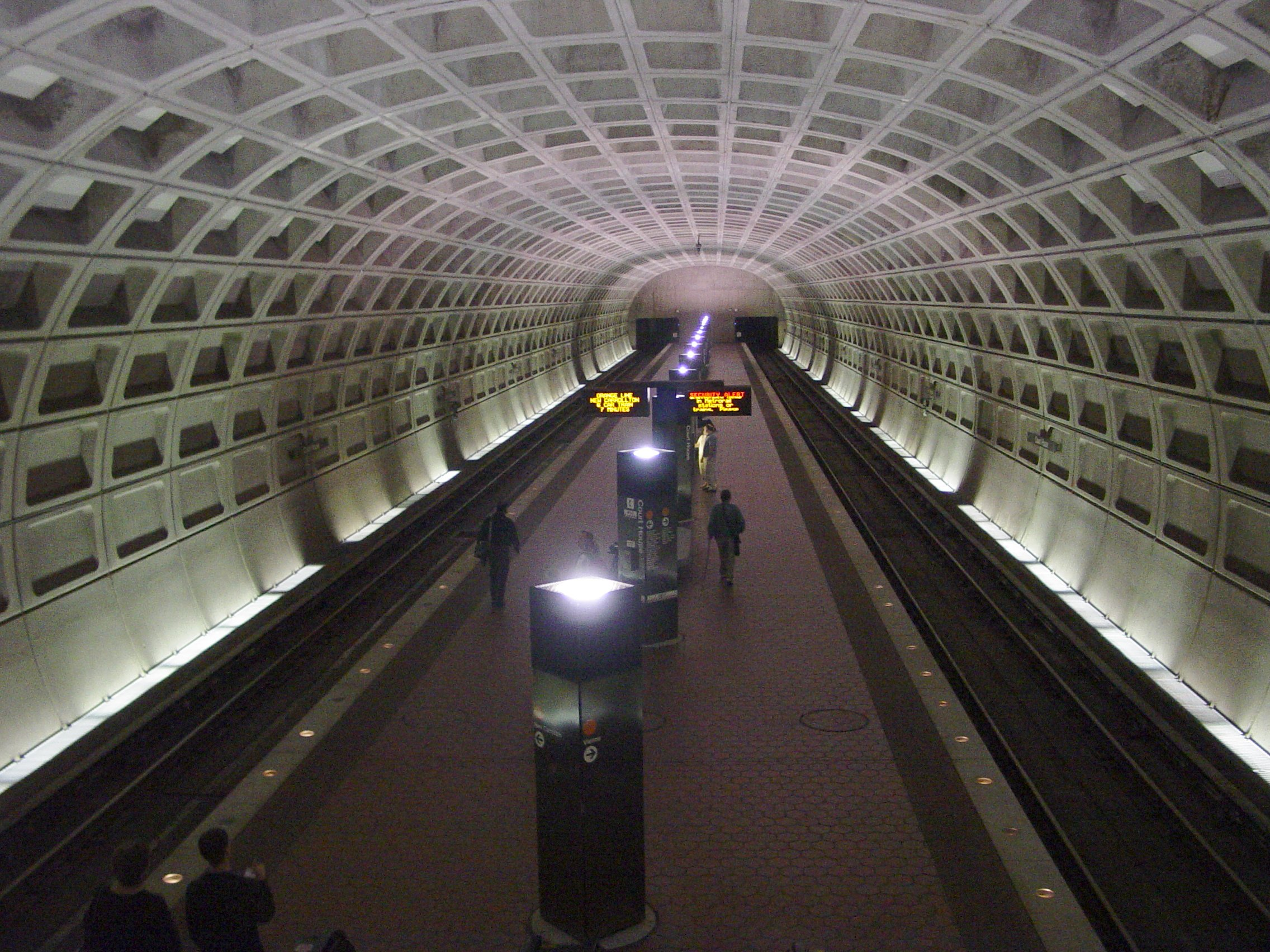
- Station view from the mezzanine in May 2004

General information
- Location: 2100 Wilson Boulevard; Arlington County, Virginia, U.S.
- Coordinates: 38°53′29″N 77°05′06″W
- Owner: Washington Metropolitan Area Transit Authority
- Platforms: 1 island platform
- Tracks: 2
- Connections: Metrobus: A58, F62; Arlington Transit: 41, 43, 45, 56, 77

Construction
- Structure type: Underground
- Depth: 80 feet (24 m)
- Cycle facilities: Capital Bikeshare, 25 racks
- Accessible: Yes

Other information
- Station code: K01

History
- Opened: December 1, 1979; 46 years ago

Passengers
- 2025: 4,490 (average weekday)
- Rank: 38 of 98

Services
Preceding station	Washington Metro	Following station
Clarendon toward Vienna	Orange Line	Rosslyn toward New Carrollton
Clarendon toward Ashburn	Silver Line	Rosslyn toward Downtown Largo or New Carrollton
Route map
Location

Court House station is an island platformed Washington Metro station in the Courthouse neighborhood of Arlington County, Virginia, United States. The station was opened on December 1, 1979, and is operated by the Washington Metropolitan Area Transit Authority (WMATA). Weekday ridership is approximately 7,000 passengers per day. The station serves the Orange and Silver Lines.

== Location ==
As the name implies, the station is located near the Arlington County government and court complex, with its main entrance at the intersection of Wilson Boulevard and Uhle Street.

== History ==
The station opened on December 1, 1979. Its opening coincided with the completion of approximately 3 miles (4.8 km) of rail west of the Rosslyn station and the opening of the Clarendon, Virginia Square and Ballston stations. Presently, there are long-range plans to create a new entrance for the station at its western end. These plans envision an elevator that would connect the western end of the platform to a location near the corner of Clarendon Boulevard and Barton Street.

== Station layout ==
This station is the third deepest station on the Orange and Silver Lines behind L'Enfant Plaza and Rosslyn. Its platforms are located approximately 80 feet (24 m) below street level. Similar to most Red Line stations north of Cleveland Park, Court House contains an upper underpass mezzanine 20 feet (6.1 m) below the street level. A long bank of escalators connects the upper mezzanine to the lower mezzanine. The platforms are located below the mezzanine.

A knockout panel exists on the far end of the station vault to allow construction of a second mezzanine and series of exits in the future.

Court House is one of the few Washington Metro stations outside the Red Line that contain deep-bored, elliptical escalator banks. Unlike most Metro stations, Court House station has four exits.
