= Christiansburg Presbyterian Church =

Historic house in Virginia, United States

- U.S. National Register of Historic Places
- U.S. Historic district – Contributing property
- Virginia Landmarks Register
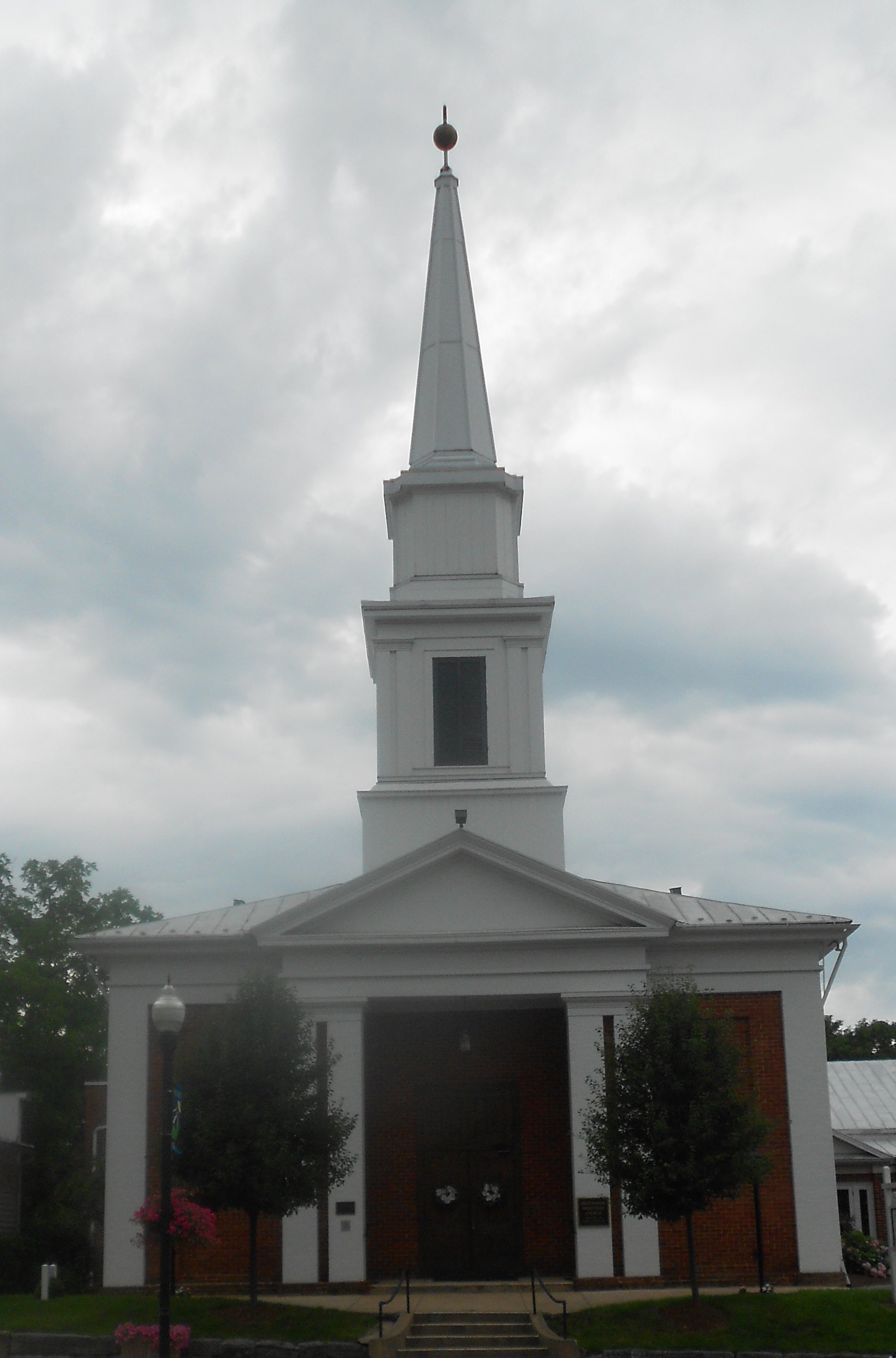
- Christiansburg Presbyterian Church, July 2013

- Location within Virginia Location within the United States
- Location: 107 W. Main St., Christiansburg, Virginia
- Coordinates: 37°7′42″N 80°24′41″W
- Area: 4 acres (1.6 ha)
- Built: 1853
- Built by: Deyerle, David
- Architect: Crush, James E.
- Architectural style: Greek Revival
- NRHP reference No.: 78003031
- VLR No.: 154-0003

Significant dates
- Added to NRHP: January 30, 1978
- Designated VLR: June 21, 1977

Christiansburg Presbyterian Church is a historic Presbyterian church located at 107 W. Main Street in Christiansburg, Montgomery County, Virginia. The church was organized in 1827. The building was erected in 1853 and is a four bay long, brick church building with a low hipped roof. It features a three-stage tower consisting of a low, plain base, a square belfry with coupled Doric order corner pilasters, and a blind lantern stage. The whole is capped by an octagonal spire. Also on the property is the contributing former Rectory, now known as the Kinnard Smith Building and used as a parish house.

It was added to the National Register of Historic Places in 1978. It is located in the Christiansburg Downtown Historic District.
