= Clarendon station =

Washington Metro station in Virginia, US

Clarendon
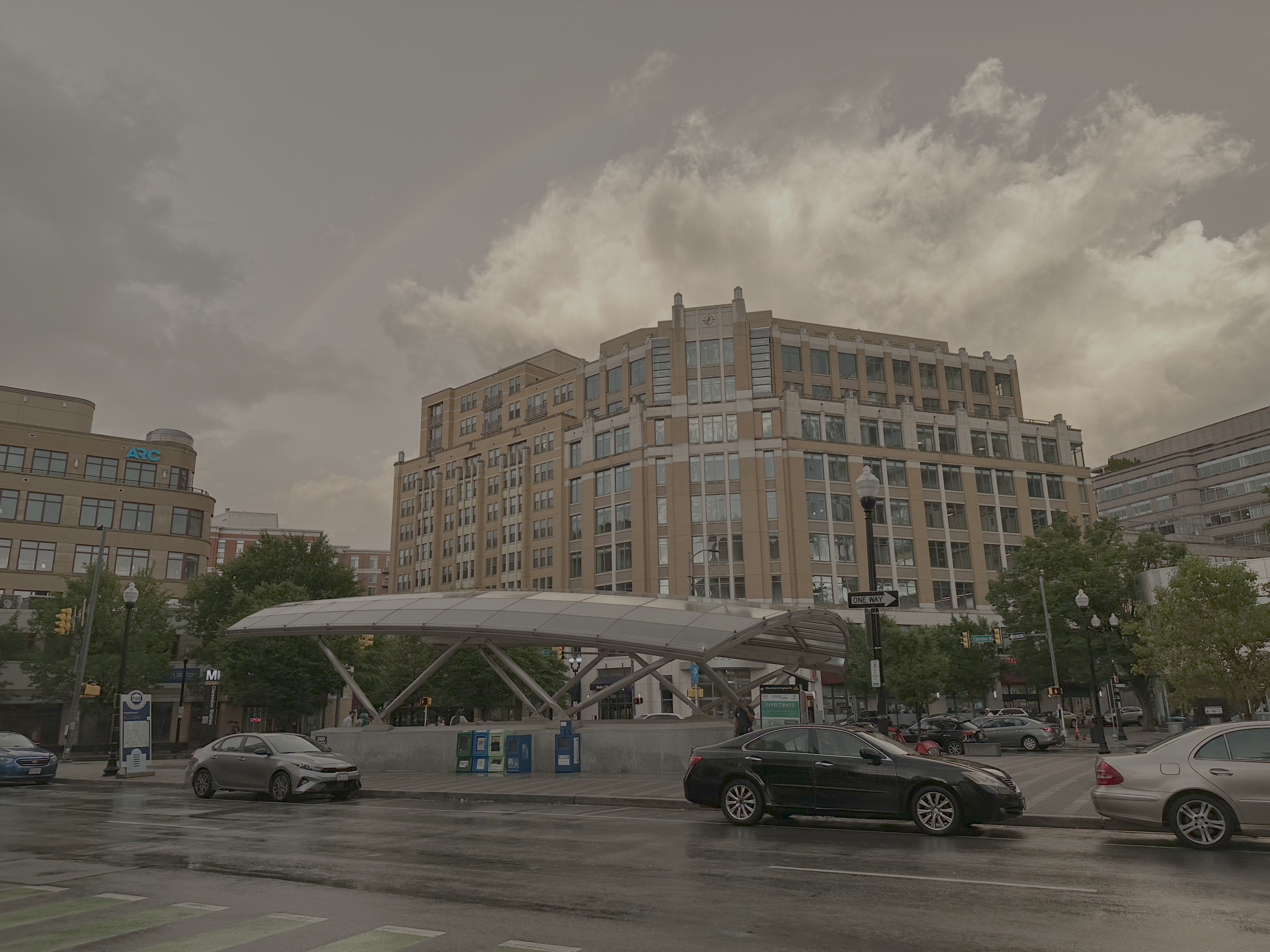
- The entrance to Clarendon station, July 2024

General information
- Location: 3100 Wilson Boulevard; Arlington County, Virginia
- Coordinates: 38°53′14″N 77°05′43″W
- Owner: Washington Metropolitan Area Transit Authority
- Platforms: 2 side platforms
- Tracks: 2
- Connections: Metrobus: A58; Arlington Transit: 41, 42, 56

Construction
- Structure type: Underground
- Cycle facilities: Capital Bikeshare 12 racks, 6 lockers
- Accessible: Yes

Other information
- Station code: K02

History
- Opened: December 1, 1979; 46 years ago

Passengers
- 2025: 3,452 (average weekday)
- Rank: 53 of 98

Services
Preceding station	Washington Metro	Following station
Virginia Square–GMU toward Vienna	Orange Line	Court House toward New Carrollton
Virginia Square–GMU toward Ashburn	Silver Line	Court House toward Downtown Largo or New Carrollton
Route map
Location

Clarendon station is a side platformed Washington Metro station in the Clarendon neighborhood of Arlington County, Virginia, United States. The station was opened on December 1, 1979, and is operated by the Washington Metropolitan Area Transit Authority (WMATA). The station serves the Orange and Silver Lines. In 2017, over 4,000 commuters used Clarendon station every day.

== Location ==
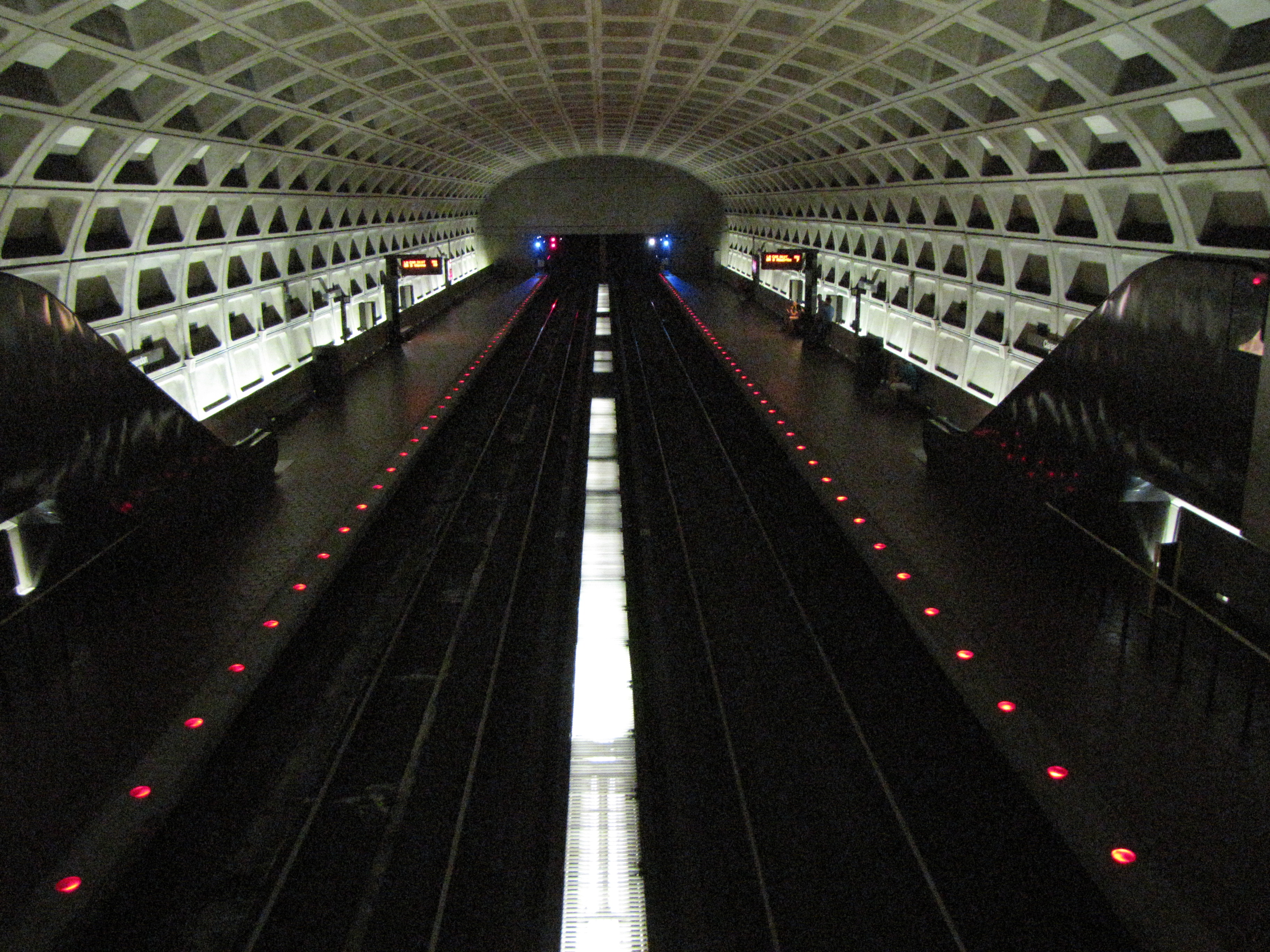
Station platforms facing east in May 2010

The Clarendon station is located in the Clarendon neighborhood of Arlington County, Virginia, at the intersection of Highland Street, Clarendon Boulevard, and Wilson Boulevard. The station entrance itself lies in a park-like median between Clarendon and Wilson Boulevards. There is an underpass providing access to the Omsted Building on the south side of Clarendon Boulevard.

The presence of Clarendon station has transformed the surrounding district into an urban village. As a result, a number of residential and shopping complexes have opened. These include the residential buildings such as Station Square, Clarendon 1021, The Phoenix at Clarendon, and The Hartford along with the Market Common Clarendon shopping center.

== History ==
The station was constructed by the Nello L. Teer Company, and opened on December 1, 1979. Its opening coincided with the completion of approximately 3 miles (4.8 km) of rail west of the Rosslyn station and the opening of the Court House, Virginia Square and Ballston stations.

From March 26, 2020 until June 28, 2020, this station was closed due to the COVID-19 pandemic.

== Station layout ==
Similar to many of the stations opened at the same time, Clarendon uses a side platform setup with two tracks. Architecturally, as part of the first generation of underground stations, the "waffle" coffer style predominates at Clarendon.

Escalators bring passengers to the mezzanine level, which contains the faregates and ticket machines. Clarendon station is quite shallow, so much in fact that there is a staircase in between the two escalators that reach street level.
