= Phlegar Building =

Historic commercial building in Virginia, United States

- U.S. National Register of Historic Places
- U.S. Historic district – Contributing property
- Virginia Landmarks Register
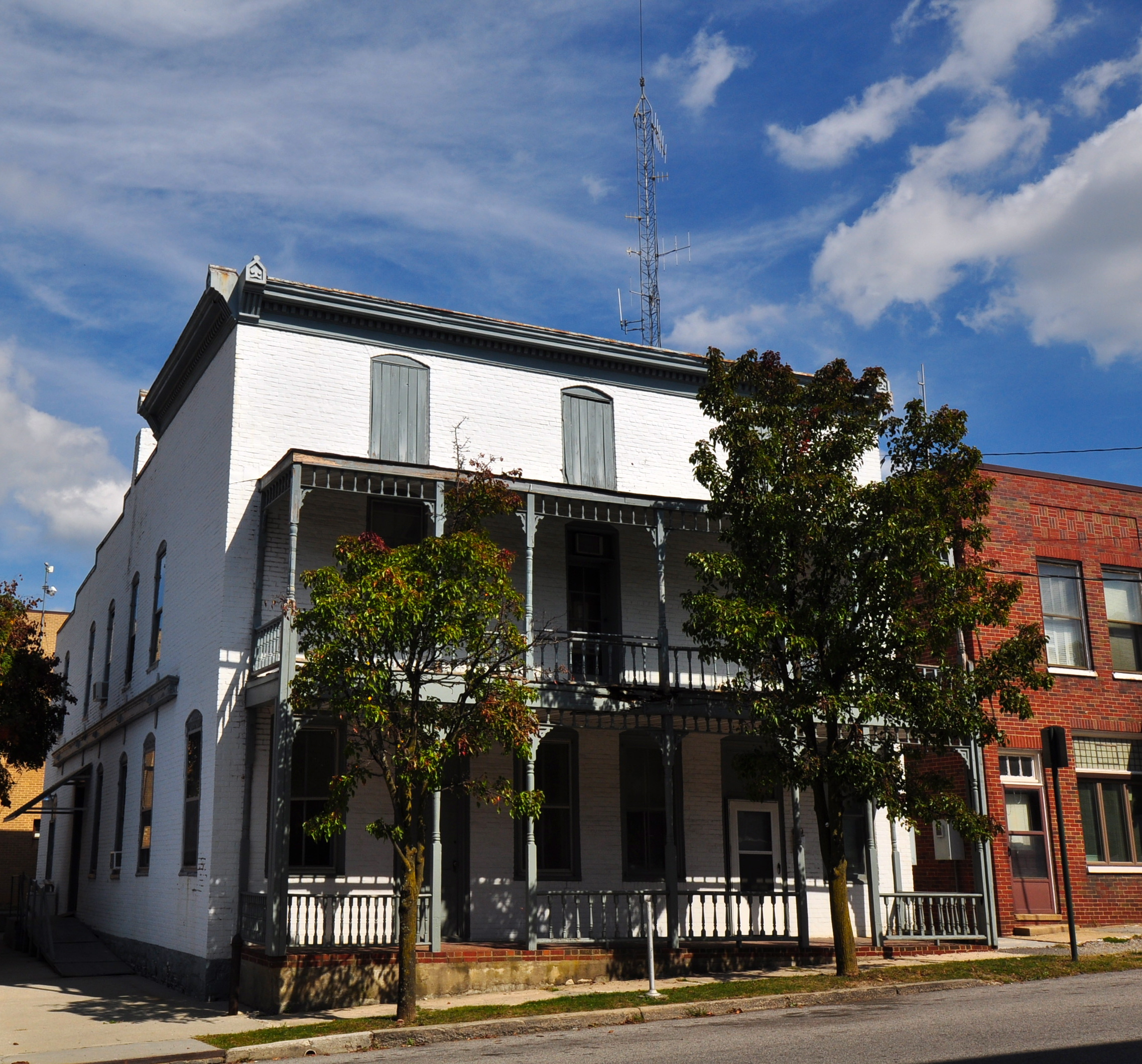
- Phlegar Building, October 2013

- Location within Virginia Location within the United States
- Location: 2 S. Franklin St., Christiansburg, Virginia
- Coordinates: 37°7′46″N 80°24′30″W
- Area: less than one acre
- Architectural style: Italianate
- MPS: Montgomery County MPS
- NRHP reference No.: 89001892
- VLR No.: 154-0007

Significant dates
- Added to NRHP: November 13, 1989
- Designated VLR: June 20, 1989

Phlegar Building is a historic office building located at Christiansburg, Montgomery County, Virginia. The original structure was built in the early 19th century, and extensively renovated after 1897. It is a three-story, rectangular brick building with Italianate style decorative details. It features a two-story porch of six bays with turned posts, a spindle frieze, brackets, and turned balusters.

It was listed on the National Register of Historic Places in 1989. It is located in the Christiansburg Downtown Historic District.
