= Nello L. Teer Company =

American Company

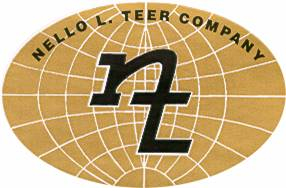
- Type: Privately held company
- Industry: General Contractor
- Founded: 1909
- Founders: Nello L. Teer
- Headquarters: Durham, North Carolina, U.S.
- Services: General Construction
- Number of employees: 5000
- Website: www.nelloteer.com

Nello L. Teer Company was a privately owned General Contracting firm founded in 1909 by Nello Leguy Teer. It was headquartered in Durham, North Carolina, and grew to be one of the largest construction companies in the world. Pittsburgh, Pennsylvania-based global chemical and materials company Koppers purchased the company and today much of the aggregate assets are part of Lehigh Hanson - Heidelberg Materials in North America, rail assets are part of CSX, the road construction aspects are held within the Colas Group, and some of the real estate management aspects were transferred to Teer Associates.

== History ==
Research Triangle Park. The Great North Road. The Israeli Air Bases. The Blue Ridge Parkway.

== Divisions ==
=== Africa Office ===
In 1968, the company opens an Africa Office in Dar Es Salaam, Tanzania.

=== Asphalt Division ===
In 1945, the Asphalt Division was formed to do defense work in Gulfport, Mississippi; and later highway work in North Carolina.

=== Building Division ===
The Building Division was officially launched in 1965, but it was not until 1973, The Nello Teer Company bought Romeo Guest Associates of Greensboro, a well-established industrial building firm. With 80 years of experience, Romeo Guest Associates became the Building Division of the Nello L. Teer Company without any changes in management. The experienced Guest firm built major manufacturing plants in 13 states, a distinction that added a competitive element to the Nello L. Teer Company’s newly formed Heavy and Industrial Division. Today Romeo Guest Associates, Inc., is an employee-owned company based in Durham, North Carolina.

=== Central American Division ===
In 1955, the Central American Division opens its headquarters in Guatemala City, marking the launch of Nello L. Teer International.

=== Central Engineering and Contracting Corporation ===
In 1940, Central Engineering and Contracting Corporation opens and is responsible for owning and maintaining the company’s equipment. In 1980, the company owned over 5,000 pieces of yellow iron that was located in North America, Central America, Africa, and the Middle East.

=== Concrete Paving Division ===
The Concrete paving Division was started to pave the Colonial Highway, Williamsburg, Virginia.

=== Dredging Division ===
In 1955, the Dredging Division was started with work in Florida, Virginia and later Maryland.

=== Durham-Southern Railway ===
When the Nello L. Teer Company bought the Durham and Southern Railway in 1954, it was still using steam engines. Four Baldwin 1200 Horse power Diesel Electric Locomotives were purchased in 1956 to replace the steam locomotives.

=== Quarry Division ===
The Quarry Division operated several quarries including the Crabtree Quarry in Raleigh, North Carolina. Other quarries were located in Durham, Holly Springs, New Bern, Princeton, Raleigh, Rocky Mount, and Rougemount.

=== Teer Enterprises ===
In, 1969 The Nello L. Teer Company signed a franchise agreement with Triangle Service Center, Incorporated, the for-profit arm of RTP developer Research Triangle Foundation. During the period of 1969 to 1979, the company completed the 128-room Governors Inn Hotel, 50 and 100 Park Offices. The company, in 1972, placed its real estate development assets in Teer Enterprises, Ltd. then launched the construction of 200 Park Offices and 300 Park Offices. The company started construction on 400 Park Offices in 1980 which was eventually occupied by GTE Government Systems and it then expanded Governors Inn to 203 rooms including additional meeting and lounge rooms. The Nello L. Teer Company merged with Koppers Company on August 1, 1980; however, the deal did not include Teer Enterprises. During 1982 the company began work on 500, 600, 700, and 800 Park Offices, which includes the IBM complex. Teer Enterprises was sold by the family in 1985 and management was transferred to a new company called Teer Associates.

=== Webster County Coal Company ===
In 1974, the Nello L. Teer Company added another layer to its activities by entering the coal mining industry. The company started a surface mining division called Webster County Coal Company. The coal stripping division started in West Virginia and Western Pennsylvania on property previously owned by the company and areas owned by established mining businesses. The Nello L. Teer Company brought a new angle to the coal stripping process by applying highway construction techniques to surface mining. Using conventional construction equipment, the Webster County Coal Company’s mines were producing up to 1.2 million tons of high-grade coal annually.

== Some Noteworthy Projects ==
=== North America ===
- Blue Ridge Parkway - 17 Sections including the first and last
- Capeheart Housing Project - 849 Units (JV with H. L. Coble Construction Company) - Cherry Point, North Carolina (1959)
- Capeheart Housing Project - 1500 Units (JV with H. L. Coble Construction Company & W. H. Weaver Construction Company) - Seymour Johnson Air Base
- Jordan Lake Dam - North Carolina
- Liggett and Myers Tobacco Company Headquarters - Durham, North Carolina
- Forsyth County Hospital - Charlotte, North Carolina
- Maine Turnpike - Section which ran from Portland to Augusta - Maine
- Roanoke Rapids Dam - North Carolina
- Duke University Chapel Excavation - Durham, North Carolina
- George P. Stevenson Dam - Sinnemahoning, Pennsylvania
- Cherry Point Marine Corps Air Station - Runway Construction - North Carolina
- Pennsylvania Turnpike - Concrete Paving Operations near Harrisburg, Pennsylvania
- Blue Cross Blue Shield Building, Chapel Hill, North Carolina
- Iceland NATO Airfield - Keflavik, Iceland
- Reigal Paper Plant - North Carolina
- West Virginia Turnpike - Six Sections - West Virginia
- Kenan Stadium - Excavation - Chapel Hill, North Carolina
- Roanoke Civic Center
- I-495 Maryland
- Duke University Medical Center - Durham, North Carolina
- Governors Inn, RTP, North Carolina
- Burroughs Wellcome Headquarters - Durham, North Carolina
- Wake County Courthouse - Raleigh, North Carolina
- Fort Lee - Grading and paving for streets and parade grounds - Virginia
- Raleigh-Durham Airport - Runway grading and paving of two perpendicular runways - North Carolina
- Winston-Salem Airport - Runway grading and paving - North Carolina
- Bear Creek Dam, Scranton, Pennsylvania
- Seymour Johnson Air Base - Expansion for B-52 jet bombers - Goldsboro, North Carolina
- Broken Bow Dam, Broken Bow, Oklahoma
- Titan II Missile Base, Tucson, Arizona (JV with J.A. Jones Construction Company & Dwight W. Winkleman Construction Company)
- K-2 Vienna Route Metro Subway (e.g., Clarendon Metro station), Arlington, Virginia
- Smithland Dam, Kentucky (JV with[J.A. Jones Construction Company)

=== International ===
==== Africa ====
- Great North Road - Tanzania, Africa
- Four United States air bases in Morocco, Northern Africa including Nouasseur Air Base

Atlas Constructors (A Joint Venture of Morrison-Knudsen, Nello L. Teer Company, Bates & Rogers Construction Corp., Blythe Bros. Company, and Ralph R. Mills Co., Inc.)

- Dantopka-Akpakpa Bridge - Republic of Benin, West Africa
- Kamuzu International Airport - Lilongwe, Malawi

==== Central America ====
- Pan-American Highway, Guatemala
- Rama Road, Nicaragua

==== Middle East ====
- Ramada Inn Doha, Qatar
- Ramon Air Base, Israel

=== South America ===
- Guri Dam - Excavation and Aggregate Production - Venezuela
