= The Crossing Clarendon =

Mixed-use development in Virginia, US

Coordinates: 38°53′16″N 77°5′29.7″W

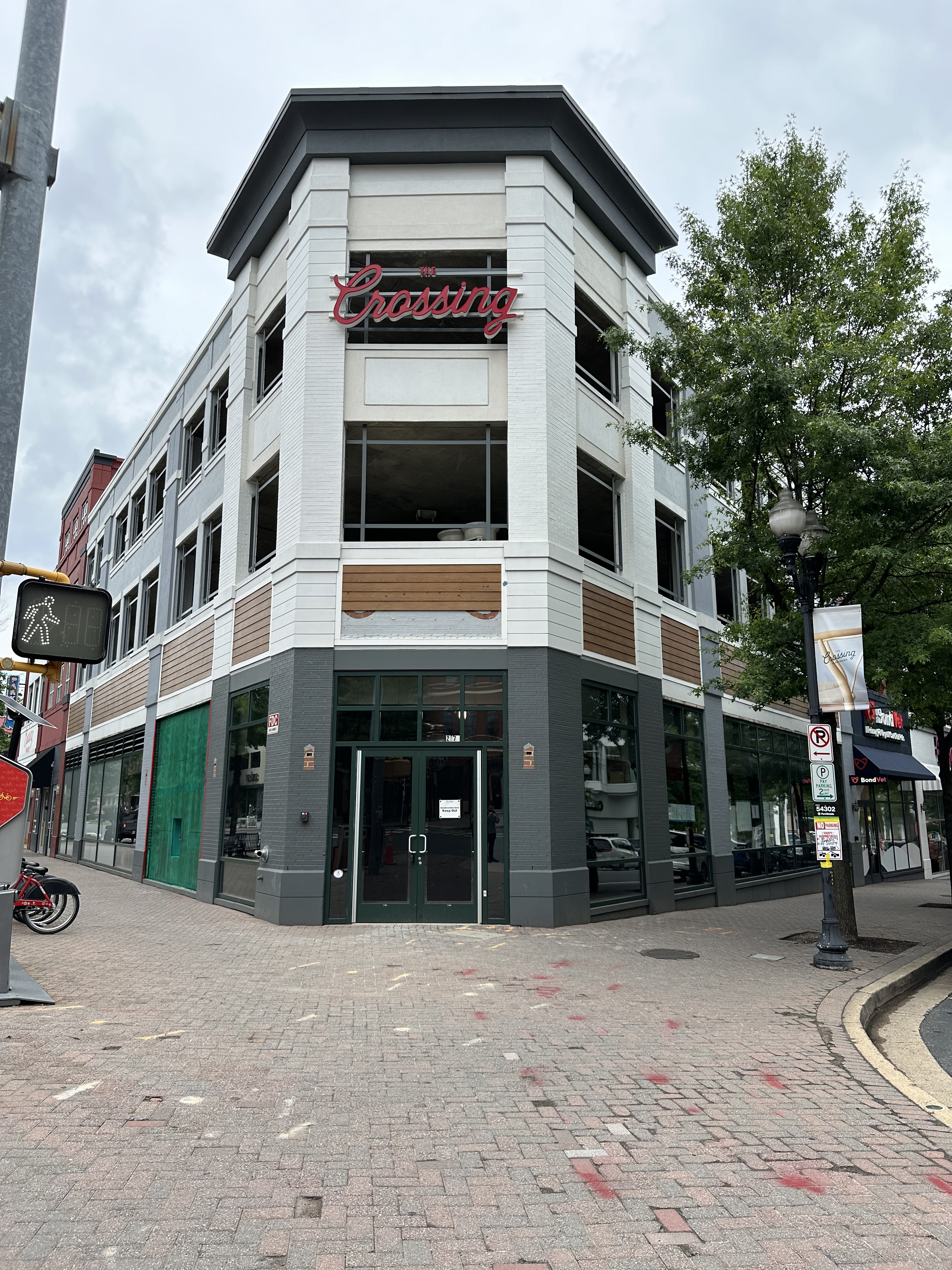
Corner at the Crossing Clarendon

The Crossing Clarendon, formerly Market Common Clarendon, is an outdoor mixed-use development featuring retail, restaurants, and residential buildings located along Clarendon Boulevard in the Clarendon neighborhood of Arlington, Virginia. The complex was developed by McCaffery Interests, and opened in November 2001. The center features stores for fashion, electronics, groceries (Whole Foods Market), and dining. It is a few blocks away from both Clarendon Metrorail station and the Courthouse neighborhood of Arlington.

TIAA-CREF bought Market Common Clarendon from McCaffery in 2002. In 2016, Regency Centers and AvalonBay Communities bought the complex for $406 million. In 2021, Regency renamed it The Crossing Clarendon.
