= Clarendon, Virginia =

Clarendon, Arlington, Virginia
- Neighborhood
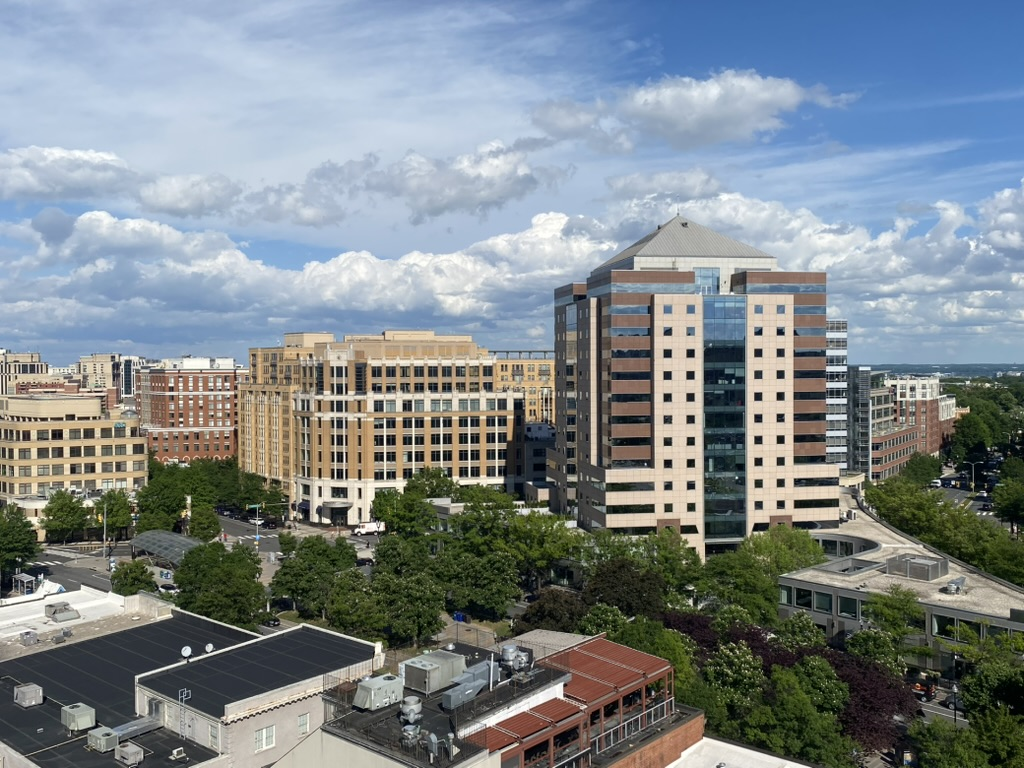
- Downtown Clarendon
- Interactive map of Clarendon, Arlington, Virginia
- Country: United States of America
- State: Virginia
- County: Arlington
- Founded: 1900
- Founder: Robert Treat Paine, Jr.
- Time zone: UTC-5 (EST)
  - Summer (DST): UTC-4 (EDT)
- ZIP Codes: 22201
- Area code: 703

Clarendon is a neighborhood in northern Arlington County, Virginia. It is located along an urban corridor that follows the Orange and Silver Metro lines, and is generally bounded by 13th Street North, North Kirkwood Road, 9th Street North, and North Danville Street.

Clarendon was founded in 1900 as a streetcar suburb of nearby Washington, D.C. It served as a popular shopping district as Arlington County's population expanded during the first half of the 20th century. Following the end of the Vietnam War and a decline in Clarendon's commercial district, Vietnamese migrants established an ethnic enclave in Clarendon, which lasted into the 1980s. The completion of the Clarendon Metro station in 1979 drove significant densification and redevelopment of Clarendon's urban environment that continues in the 21st century. Today, Clarendon has become a walkable, mixed-use community with shopping, dining, and nightlife amenities.

== Etymology ==
The origin of the name "Clarendon" is uncertain, but it has been speculated that Robert Treat Paine, Jr., Clarendon's founder, sourced it from Edward Hyde, 1st Earl of Clarendon, a leading statesman and historian of the English Civil War. It is also possible that Paine took it from Clarendon Street in his native Boston.

== History ==
During the colonial era, the land that comprises modern Clarendon was part of the larger Northern Neck land grant. William Struttfield of Westmoreland County, Virginia purchased 500 acres of this property in 1709 from Thomas Fairfax, 5th Lord Fairfax of Cameron. The land passed through a series of owners during the 18th and 19th centuries, including George Mason and his son John. One of them, Robert Cruit, operated a dairy farm with enslaved labor between 1847 and the early Civil War. Cruit's farmhouse still stands in present-day Lyon Village.

=== Foundation and early development ===
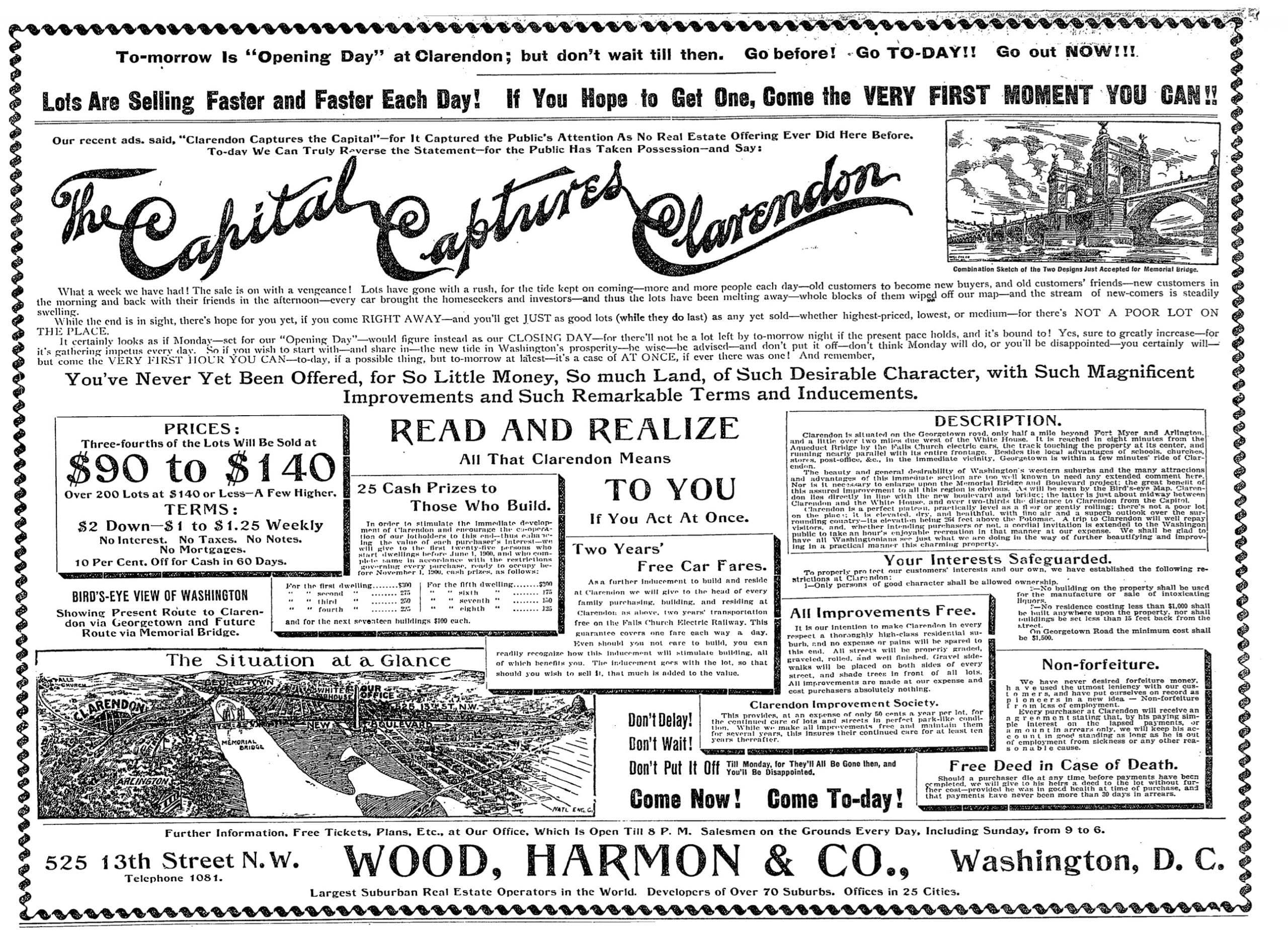
Ad from the Washington Post featuring Clarendon, April 22, 1900

Around the turn of the 20th century, Robert Treat Paine, Jr. purchased part of the original parcel and platted Clarendon in 1900. In partnership with local real estate firm Wood, Harmon, and Company, Paine advertised the community to potential homeowners as an attractive suburb near to Washington, DC. As was common in Jim Crow-era Arlington County, Clarendon is known to have had racially restrictive covenants during this period that excluded African Americans and other minority groups from purchasing property.

Aerial view of Clarendon ca. 1921-1924

Clarendon's prospects were boosted by the presence of two converging interurban trolley lines that were part of the larger Washington and Virginia Railway system. It expanded rapidly, and by the 1920s had a variety of public facilities, including an elementary school. The Clarendon Citizens Association, formed in 1912, made a failed attempt at incorporating Clarendon as an independent town in 1920. Development continued regardless, and by the 1930s Clarendon was surrounded by new subdivisions including Lyon Village, Lyon Park, and Ashton Heights.

As Arlington's population grew with the influx of Federal workers during the New Deal era and post-war period, Clarendon established itself as Arlington County's primary commercial district. National department store chains, including JC Penny and Sears, began arriving in the neighborhood during the 1940s. The County's first centralized post office, which is listed on the National Register for Historic Places, was built on Washington Boulevard in 1937.

=== Commercial decline and Little Saigon era ===
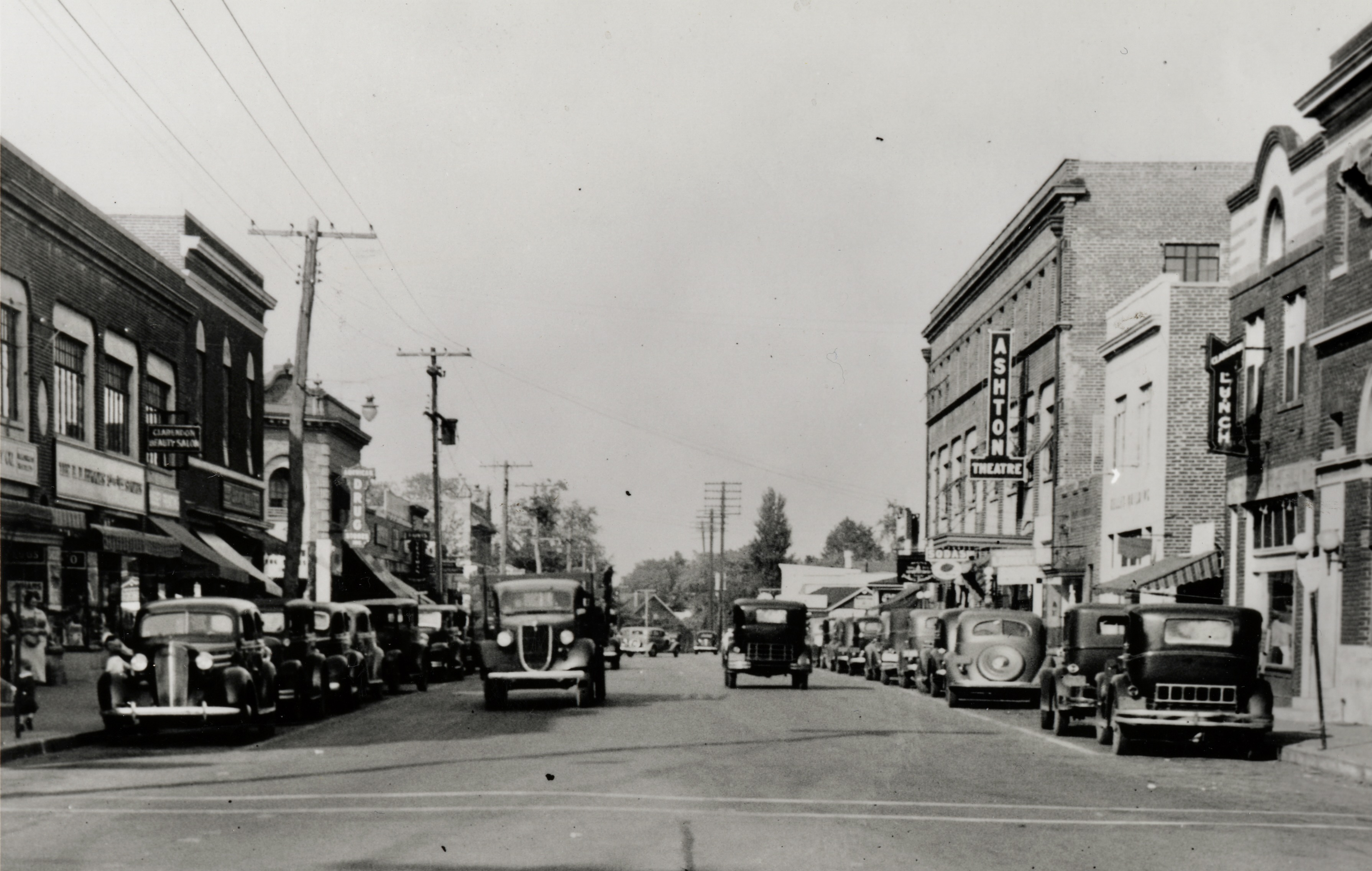
Looking down Wilson Blvd, c. 1930. Courtesy of Charlie Clark Center for Local History, Arlington Public Library

During the 1960s, businesses began to close due to increased competition from suburban malls, continued migration of residents towards outer suburbs in Fairfax and Montgomery counties, and a lack of parking facilities, which undermined Clarendon's attractiveness to shoppers. Clarendon subsequently entered a period of decline.

County officials envisioned a revitalization of struggling commercial centers along the Rosslyn-Ballston corridor such as Clarendon via the planned Washington Metro subway system. Originally set to follow Interstate 66, the Metro's Orange Line was revised to run under Wilson Boulevard after negotiations between the WMATA and the County Board. Pushback from residents on anticipated high-rise buildings resulted in the adoption of the County's "Bull's Eye" model, which locates high-density structures within a walkable distance from the Metro stations while maintaining preexisting single-family zoning beyond a specific radius. Construction of the Clarendon metro station began in 1974 and lasted until 1979, which necessitated the demolition of an entire block of commercial structures.

Metro construction, along with the pressures already facing Clarendon's business community, resulted in depressed rents. This attracted refugees migrating to the Washington area from Vietnam and other parts of Southeast Asia in the aftermath of the Vietnam War; around 5,000 had settled in Arlington by the late 1970s. 2 Vietnamese grocery stores, Saigon Market and Vietnam Center, had opened by 1975 along Wilson Boulevard. They were followed by a variety of Vietnamese businesses, including restaurants, jewelers, and stores selling imported textiles and other specialty items.

By 1979, Clarendon became known by names such as "Little Saigon" and "Mekong Delta", and was recognized as one of the largest Southeast Asian commercial centers on the East Coast. It served as an economic and social hub for the region's Vietnamese immigrants, some of whom would travel from states outside of the immediate metropolitan area to visit the community. After the completion of Clarendon station on December 1, 1979, Vietnamese businesses were gradually pushed out of neighborhood as landlords increased rents and County officials encouraged redevelopment. By the 1990s, a majority of Clarendon's Vietnamese businesses had closed or were displaced to the Eden Center in nearby Falls Church in pursuit of greater affordability.

=== Post-Metro redevelopment ===
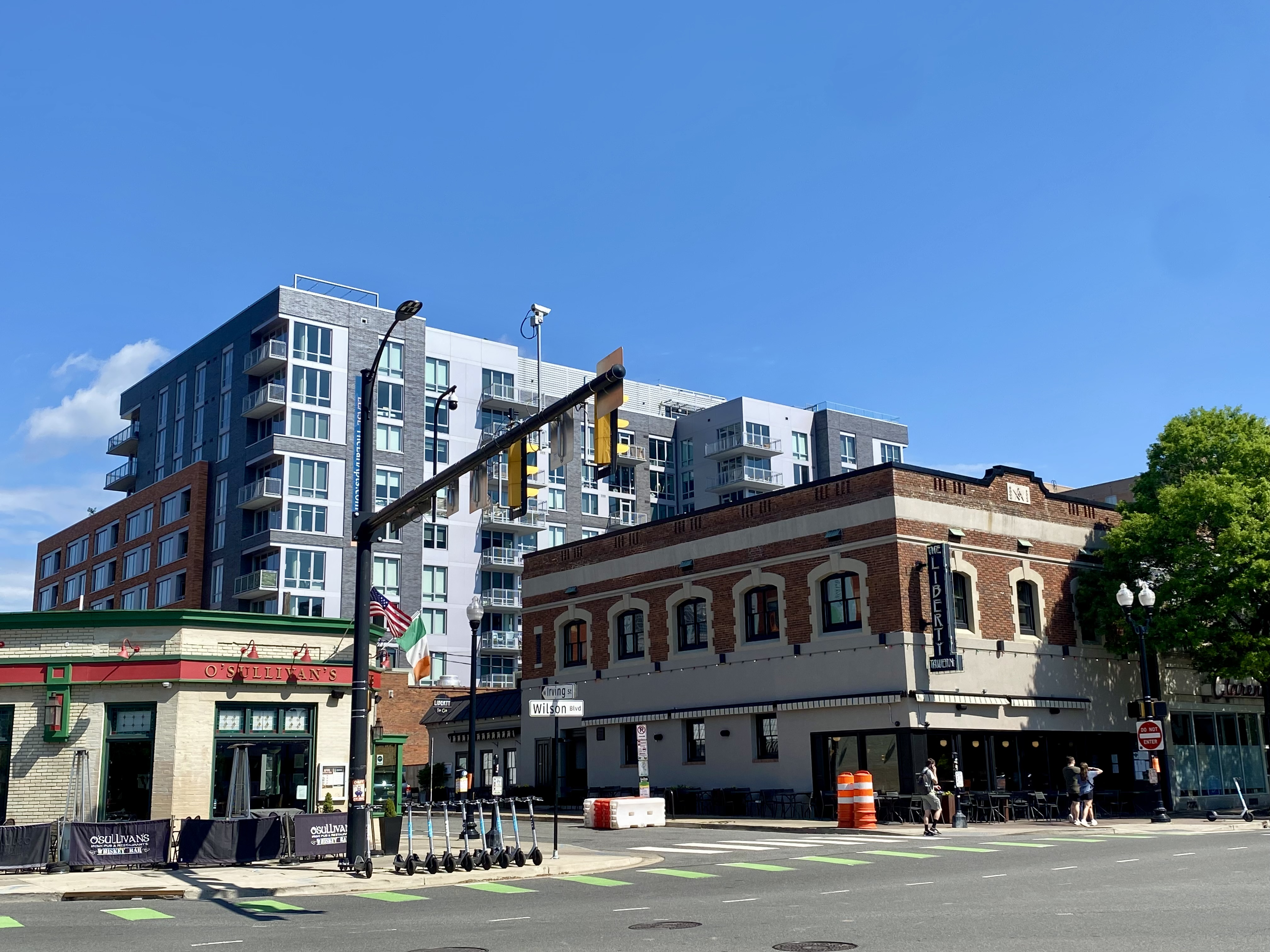
Intersection of Wilson Blvd and N Irving St. The Masonic Lodge building, constructed in 1910, stands in the foreground

Following the opening of the Metro station, County planners intended on transforming Clarendon into a walkable, mixed-use urban village. The construction of the Olmsted tower, a 14-story office building with ground floor retail completed in 1987, was framed as the beginning of Clarendon's revitalization, but development slowed during the 1990s.

The 2000s saw accelerated growth: between the years 2000 and 2010, the housing stock in the Clarendon area increased by almost 300%, with population growth skewing towards young adults between ages 25–34. Clarendon also started attracting national chain stores. Market Common (rebranded as The Crossing in 2021), a large residential and retail property, opened on Clarendon Boulevard in 2001 with tenants including Williams-Sonoma and Pottery Barn. Clarendon has continued to become increasingly urbanized and affluent, and the neighborhood has acquired a reputation of being expensive.

== Geography ==
Clarendon is located in Arlington's northern half. It falls within the urbanized Rosslyn-Ballston corridor along the Silver and Orange Metro lines. The precise dimensions of Clarendon are not defined, and several different sets of boundaries are often used. These include:

- Arlington County's Clarendon sector plan area, roughly bounded by 13th Street North, North Kirkwood Road, 9th Street North, and North Danville Street
- The boundaries of the Clarendon-Courthouse Civic Association, which overlap with the adjacent Court House neighborhood and includes Wilson Boulevard, N. Courthouse Road, Arlington Boulevard, and N. 10th Street

Clarendon's high-density buildings generally concentrate around the Clarendon Metro station and the area between Wilson Boulevard and 10th Street N. per Arlington's zoning guidelines. The neighborhoods to Clarendon's immediate north, Lyon Village, and south, Lyon Park and Ashton Heights, are low-density and suburban in character. Court House and Virginia Square lie to Clarendon's east and west, respectively.

== Economy ==
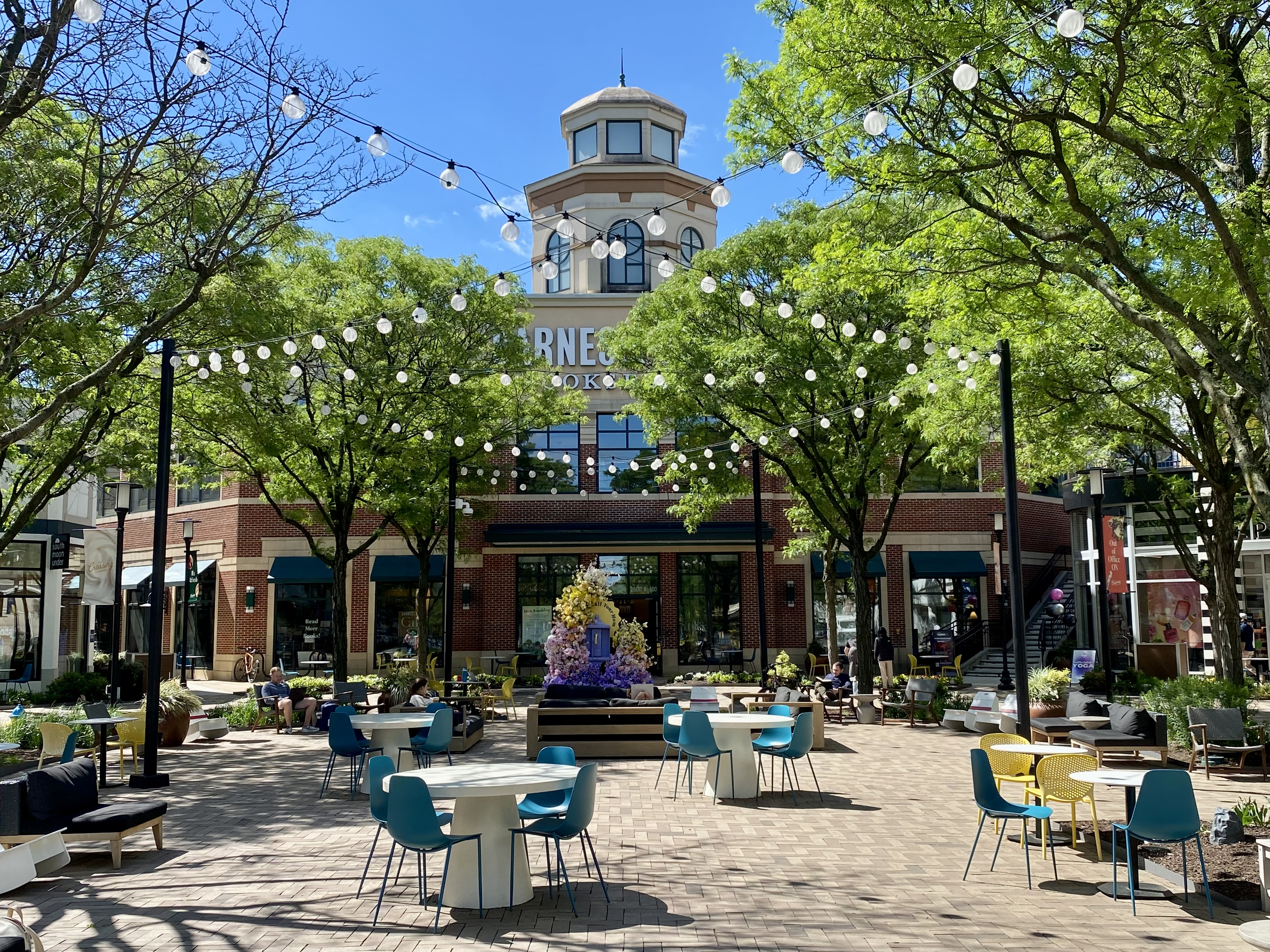
Pedestrianized section of The Crossing shopping center

As a mixed-use neighborhood, Clarendon has both commercial and residential properties located in close proximity. Its business district has numerous offices, bars, restaurants, cafes, banks, and fitness centers that exist along its main boulevards, such as The Crossing shopping center, which hosts a variety of retailers and dining establishments. It also has an active nightlife scene. Occupants of Clarendon's office buildings include organizations such as the Leadership Institute.

== Infrastructure ==
Clarendon's main thoroughfares consist of Wilson Boulevard, Clarendon Boulevard, and Washington Boulevard, which all intersect west of the Clarendon Metro station.

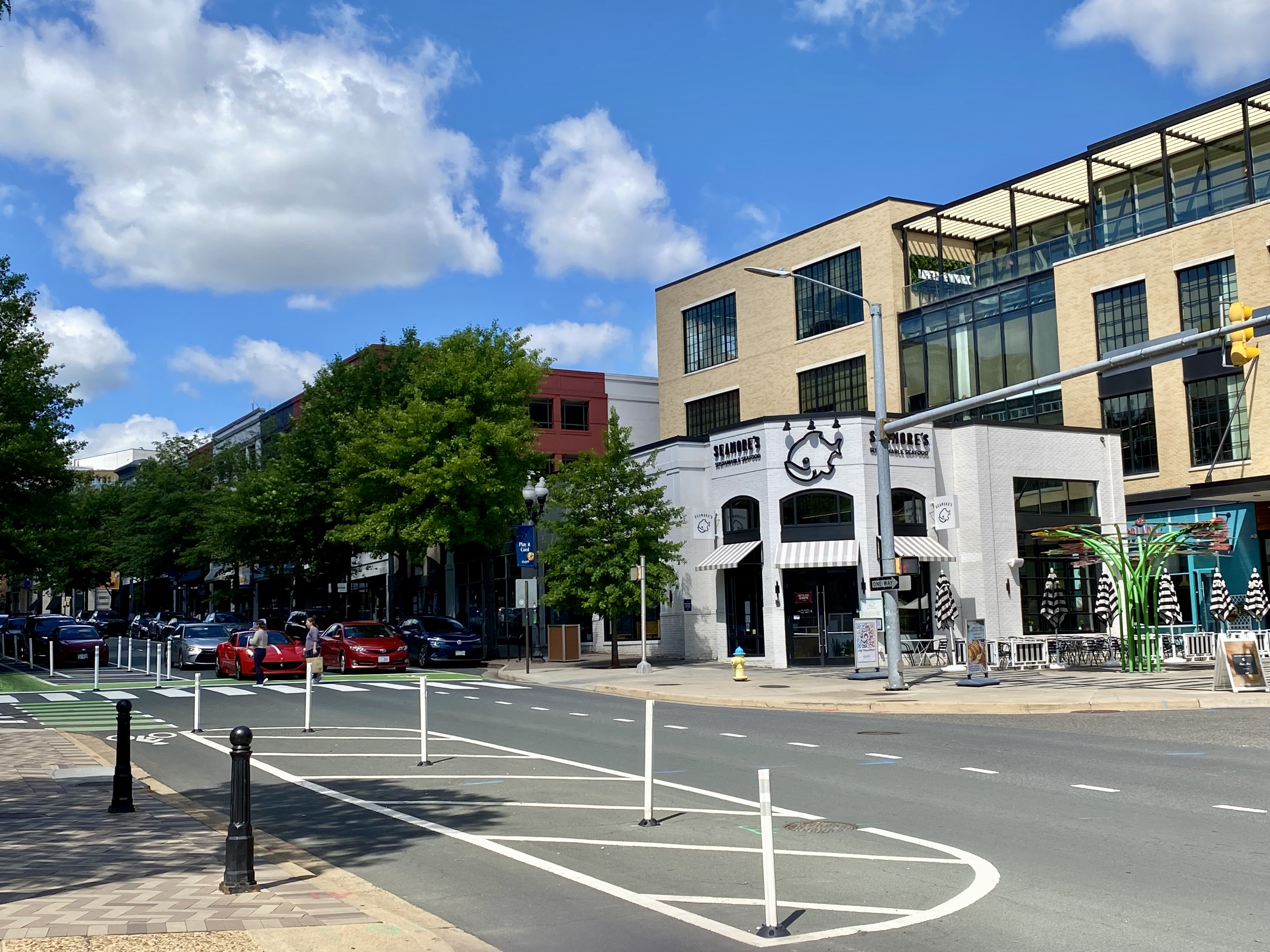
Bike lanes and bollards for traffic control at the intersection of Clarendon Blvd and N Edgewood St

The streetscape of Clarendon has been designed with bike and pedestrian-friendly infrastructure, including dedicated bike lanes and wide sidewalks. Roads and major intersections have been intentionally modified through curb extensions, medians, and other means to improve pedestrian safety. Consequentially, Clarendon has been described as one of Arlington's most walkable neighborhoods.

=== Public transit ===
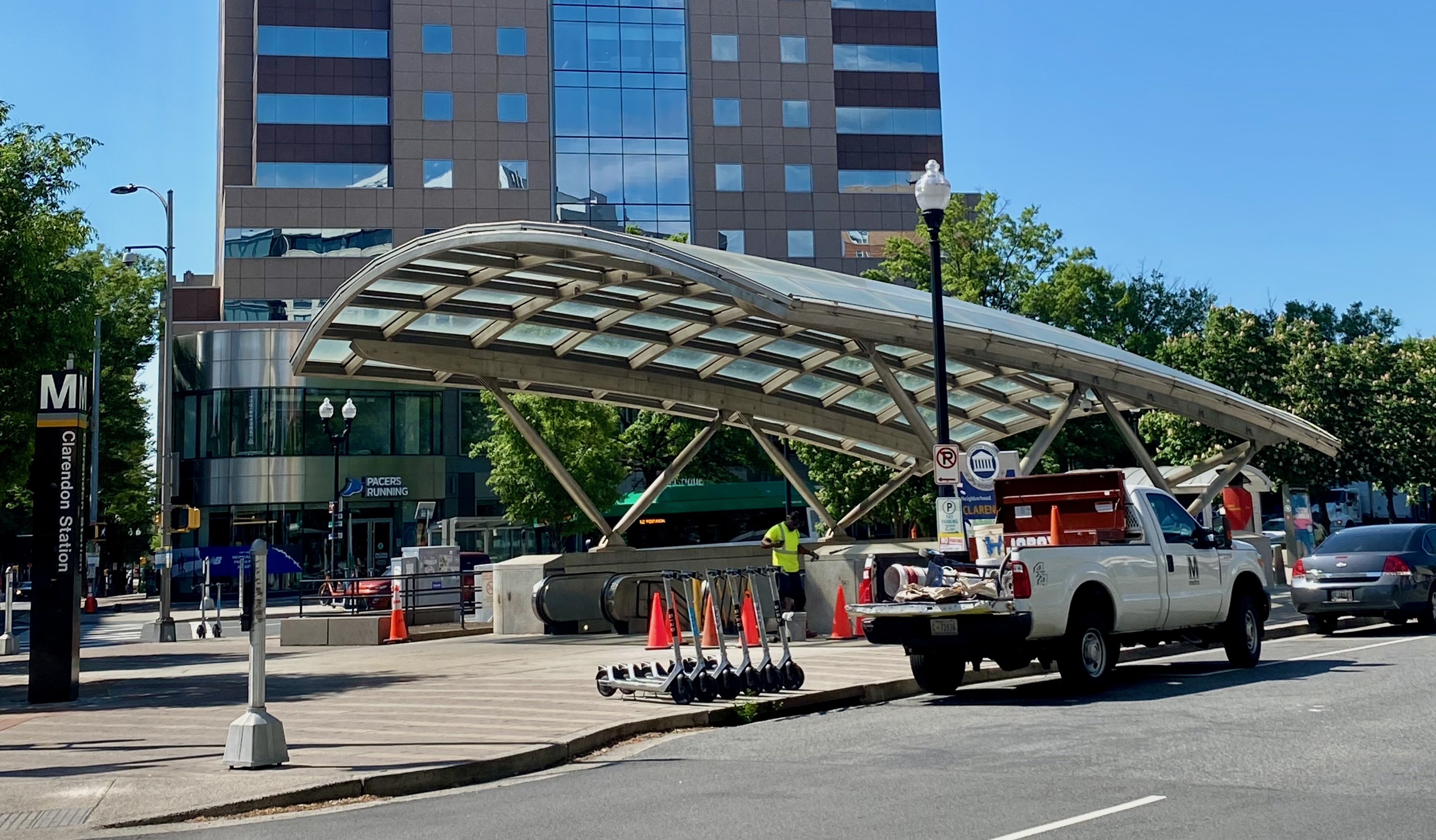
Entrance to the Clarendon Metro station

Clarendon has 3 Capital Bikeshare stations located on Wilson and Clarendon Boulevards, Fairfax Drive, and 10th Street N. Beyond the Orange and Silver Lines, Clarendon is also served by the following Metrobus and Arlington Transit bus routes:

- Metrobus A58: Ballston-Farragut West
- ART 41: Columbia Pike-Ballston-Court House
- ART 42: Ballston-Pentagon
- ART 45: Columbia Pike-DHS/Sequoia-Rosslyn
- ART 62: Court House Metro-Lorcom Lane-Ballston Metro
- ART 77: Shirlington-Lyon Park-Courthouse

== Arts and culture ==
Clarendon hosts local and County-wide events each year, including Clarendon Day, an annual street fair organized by the Clarendon Alliance that features local musicians, businesses, restaurants, and non-profits, and the Arlington Festival of the Arts along North Highland Street and Washington Boulevard. Clarendon has also been the location of the Armed Forces Associated Cycling Classic's Clarendon Cup race since 1998.

Local historians and non-profits have organized walking tours of the history of Clarendon's "Little Saigon" to commemorate the former Vietnamese enclave's origins and eventual displacement.

== Parks and recreation ==
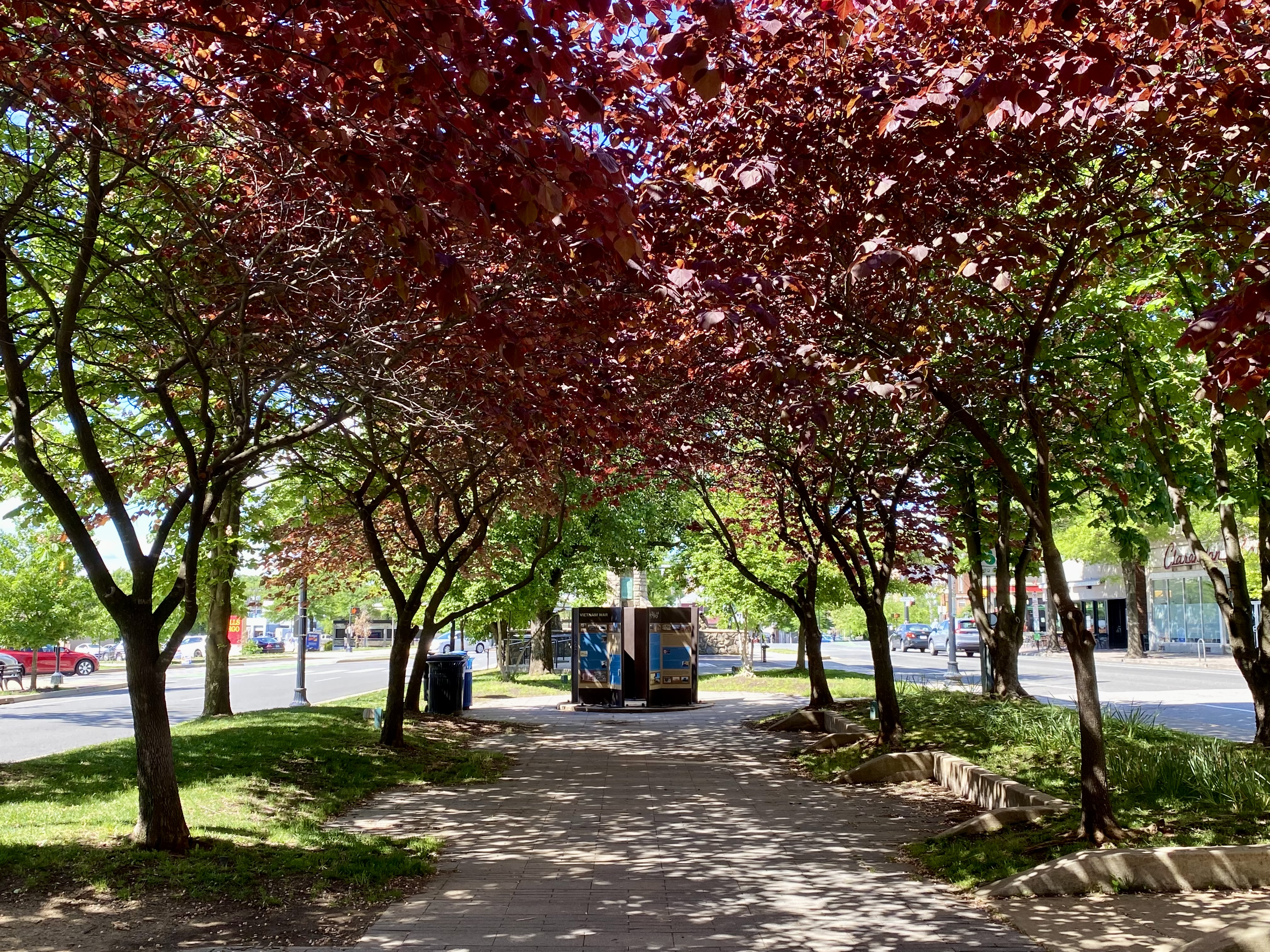
Tree canopy in Clarendon Central Park

Clarendon has several small parks, including:

- Clarendon Central Park
- James Hunter Park
- 11th Street Park

== Bibliography ==
- Abbott, Dorthea (October 1986). "The Roots of Clarendon" (PDF). Arlington Historical Magazine. 8 (2).
- Deines, Ann (October 1995). "A Survey of the Development of Arlington County, Virginia, 1940 - 1965" (PDF). Arlington Historical Magazine. 10 (3).
- O'Connell, Kim (2016). Echos of Little Saigon (PDF). Virginia Foundation for the Humanities.
- Clarendon Sector Plan 2022 (PDF). Arlington County Department of Community Planning, Housing and Development, Planning Division. April 2022.
- "Fourth Phase of an Architectural Survey in Arlington County, Virginia" (PDF). EHT Traceries, Inc.
