= United States Post Office (Christiansburg, Virginia) =

American historic structure

- US Post Office-Christiansburg
- U.S. National Register of Historic Places
- U.S. Historic district – Contributing property
- Virginia Landmarks Register
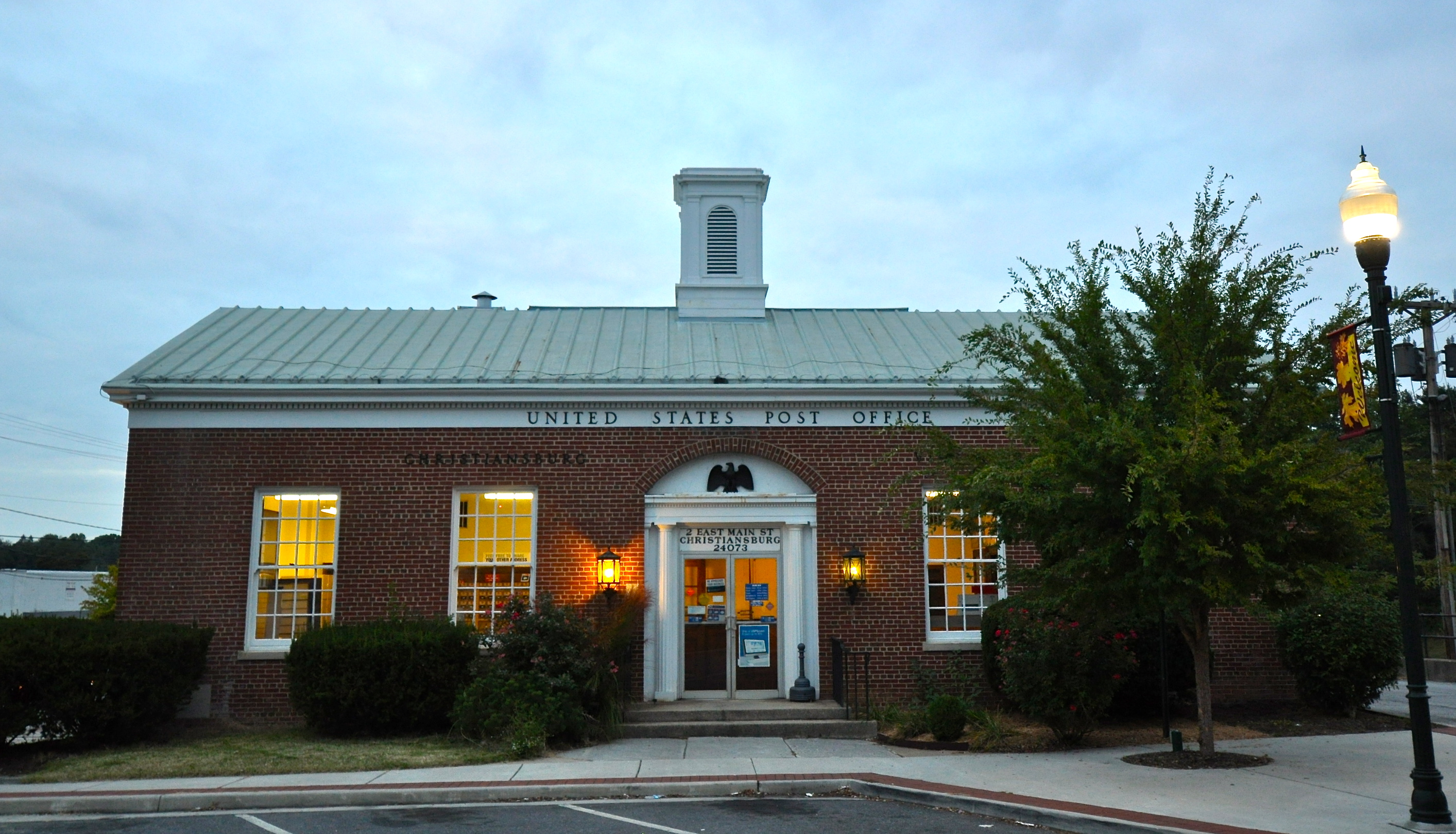

- Location within Virginia Location within the United States
- Location: NW corner of public square, Christiansburg, Virginia
- Coordinates: 37°7′49″N 80°24′33″W
- Area: less than one acre
- Built: 1936
- Architect: Simon, Louis A.; Detroot, Paul
- Architectural style: Colonial Revival
- MPS: Montgomery County MPS
- NRHP reference No.: 90002168
- VLR No.: 154-0027

Significant dates
- Added to NRHP: February 1, 1991
- Designated VLR: June 20, 1989

US Post Office-Christiansburg is a historic post office building located at Christiansburg, Montgomery County, Virginia. It was designed and built in 1936, and was designed by the Office of the Supervising Architect of the Treasury Department under Louis A. Simon. The one-story, five-bay, brick building is in the Colonial Revival style. It features a denticulated cornice and a standing-seam metal, gabled roof surmounted by a small, flat-roofed cupola. The interior features a Works Progress Administration sponsored mural by Paul DeTroot, depicting local events of the French and Indian and Revolutionary wars.

It was listed on the National Register of Historic Places in 1989. It is located in the Christiansburg Downtown Historic District.
