= Auriel Bessemer =

American painter

Auriel Bessemer (February 27, 1909 – 1986) was an American muralist, painter, designer, illustrator and author born in Grand Rapids, Michigan. He studied with Leon Kroll and Arthur Covey, at the Art Students League in New York City, Columbia University, and National Academy of Design.

Bessemer was an artist with the Section of Painting and Sculpture. He painted post office murals in Winnsboro, South Carolina and Hazlehurst, Mississippi. He also completed seven murals at the United States Post Office in Arlington, Virginia. His Virginia murals depict agricultural and historical scenes and local destinations such as Great Falls and Roosevelt Island. The murals reflected local history and were designed to instill national pride in viewers.
