= United States Post Office (Arlington, Virginia) =

Historic post office in Virginia, US

- US Post Office-Arlington
- U.S. National Register of Historic Places
- Virginia Landmarks Register
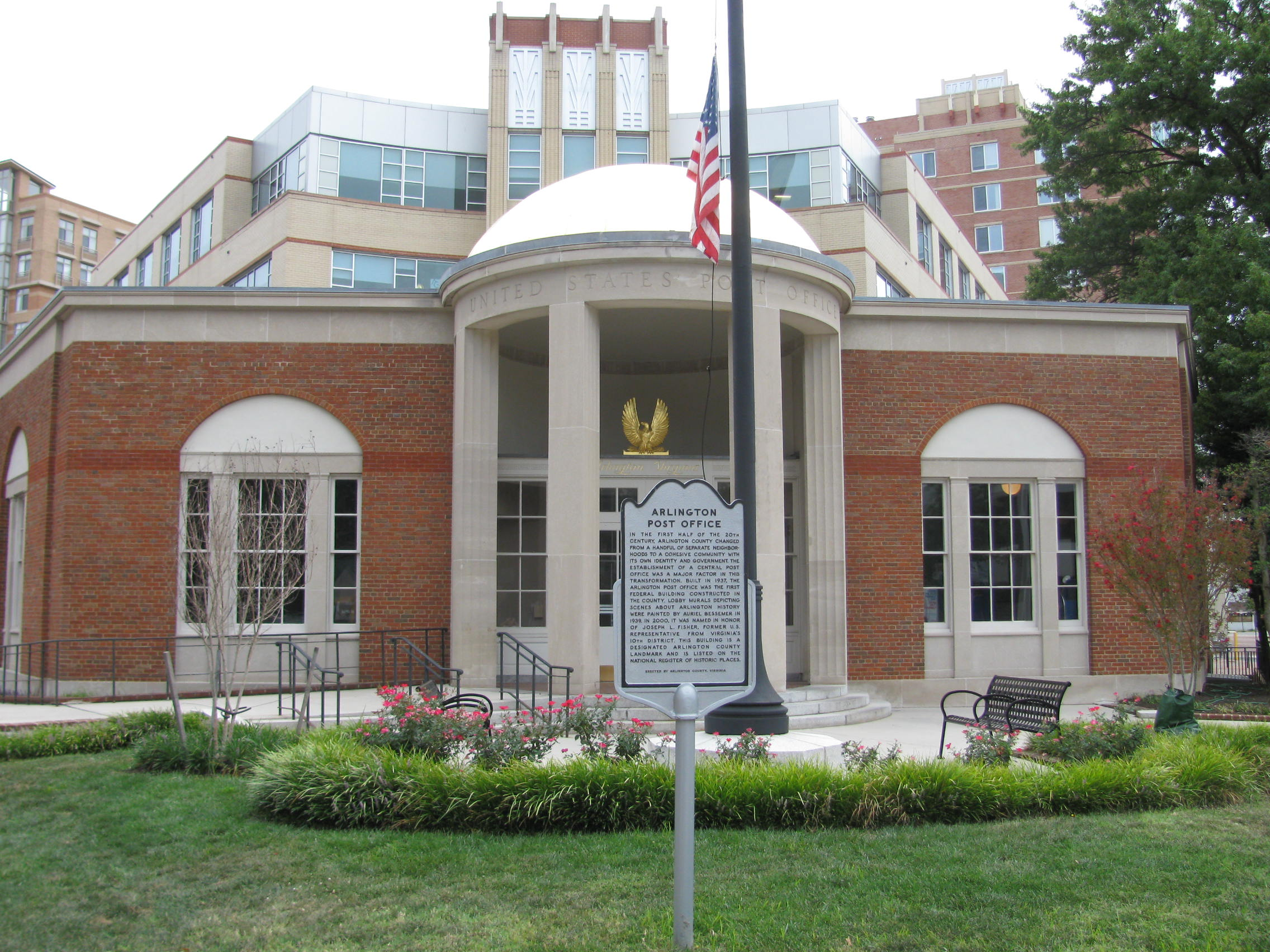
- Arlington Post Office, September 2012

- Location within District of Columbia Location within Virginia Location within the United States
- Location: 3118 N. Washington Blvd., Arlington, Virginia
- Coordinates: 38°53′8″N 77°5′44″W
- Area: 0.8 acres (0.32 ha)
- Built: 1937
- Architect: Simon, Louis A.; Et al.
- Architectural style: Colonial Revival, Georgian Revival
- NRHP reference No.: 86000151
- VLR No.: 000-0070

Significant dates
- Added to NRHP: February 7, 1986
- Designated VLR: August 13, 1985

US Post Office-Arlington is a historic post office building located in the Clarendon neighborhood of Arlington, Virginia. It was designed and built in 1937, and is one of a number of post offices designed by the Office of the Supervising Architect of the Treasury Department under Louis A. Simon. The building is a one-story, pentagonal shaped brick building in the Georgian Revival style. Atop the entrance portico is a dome that rises above the buildings flat roof and is supported by four fluted limestone piers. The interior features murals by Auriel Bessemer picturing Native Americans on Analostan Island, Captain John Smith and the Native Americans, tobacco picking by the Lee mansion, Robert E. Lee receiving his Confederate commission in Richmond, a picnic at Great Falls, polo players at Fort Myer, and a contemporary harvest at an apple orchard.

It was listed on the National Register of Historic Places on February 7, 1986.
